= List of Slovenian films =

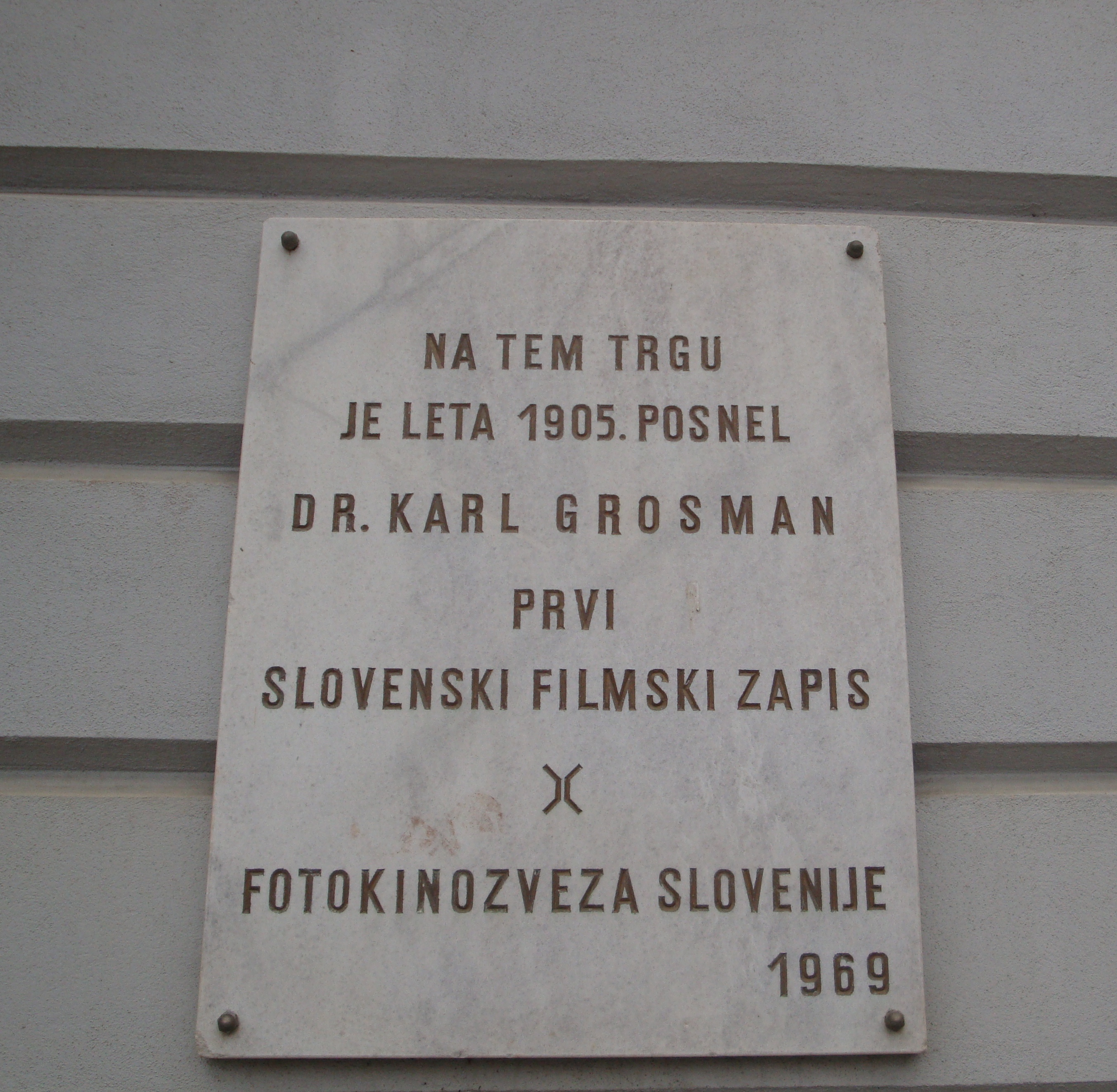
A plaque commemorating first Slovene film recording made in 1905 by Karol Grossmann in Ljutomer

This is a list of notable films produced in Slovenia or the predecessor countries on its territory.

Slovenia declared its independence from Yugoslavia on June 25, 1991. Slovene-language films produced in Yugoslavia before this date are also listed. Titles, translated titles, and release dates correspond to official entries in the Slovenian Film Fund database, which sometimes differ from entries in other film databases (such as the IMDb).

== Earliest films ==
Title	Director	Principal cast	Genre	Notes
1898
Razgled po Ljubljani (View of Ljubljana; also known as Razgled Ljubljane, Panorama Ljubljane, or Razgled po Ljubljani)	cinematographers of Lumière		short/documentary	Considered the first film recorded in the territory of the present-day Slovenia. It was presumably filmed by deputies of Auguste and Louis Lumière, although the director Srđan Kneževič ascribed it to Bläser. It was filmed from Ljubljana Castle or some other high point in the town in autumn 1898, when Ljubljana was receiving numerous visits due to the 1895 earthquake. It was about 2 minutes long and was shown by the businessman Johann Bläser in Tivoli Park (Latterman Avenue) from 7 until 14 May 1899. The film has been lost.
1905
Sejem v Ljutomeru (Fair At Ljutomer); Odhod z maše v Ljutomeru ("Dismissal from Mass in Ljutomer"); Na domačem vrtu (In the Family Garden)	Karol Grossmann		short/documentary	Considered the first examples of Slovene film
1909
Ljubljana 1909	Salvatore Spina Company, Trieste		documentary/reportage	Original title: Ljubljana. The oldest preserved video recordings of Ljubljana, the capital of Slovenia. On the 25th anniversary of the Slavec Workers' Choir of Ljubljana. 1909, 35 mm, black and white, 166 m, 7', silent.
1931
V kraljestvu Zlatoroga (In the Kingdom of the Goldhorn)	Janko Ravnik	Joža Čop, Miha Potočnik, Franica Sodja, Herbert Drofenik	acted (a trip to mountains)/documentary	The first Slovenian feature film
1932
Triglavske strmine (The Slopes of Mount Triglav)	Ferdo Delak	Milka Badjura, Anton Danilo Cerar, Pavla Marinko, Miha Potočnik, Uroš Zupančič	acted (love story)/documentary	
1941
O, Vrba	Marijan Foerster		documentary	A key Slovene pre-war film that presents the birth house and the birth village of France Prešeren, the Slovene national poet. It contains a number of sound innovations, as well as rare preserved recordings of the voices of Fran Saleški Finžgar, who presented the house, and Oton Župančič, who read the poem "O Vrba". Due to the cultural silence, the film was released only on 26 August 1945.
1946
Ljubljana pozdravlja osvoboditelje (Ljubljana Welcomes Liberators)	Marijan Foerster		acted/documentary	The first post-war film, released on 17 July 1945. On 26 August 1945, it was rereleased with some acted scenes.
1948
Na svoji zemlji (On Our Own Land)	France Štiglic	Miro Kopač, Angela Rakar, Stane Sever	war film	The first Slovenian feature film with sound; nominated for Palme d'Or at the 1949 Cannes Film Festival.

== 1950s ==
Title	Director	Principal cast	Genre	Notes
1950
1951
Kekec	Jože Gale	Matija Barl, France Presetnik	youth adventure	The first Slovenian film with an international award - Golden Lion for youth film at the 16th Venice International Film Festival
1952
Svet na Kajžarju (World at Kajžar)	France Štiglic	Miro Kopač	drama	
1953
Jara gospoda (Parvenus)	Bojan Stupica	Bojan Stupica, Stane Sever	historical drama	
Vesna	František Čáp	Metka Gabrijelčič, Franek Trefalt, Jure Furlan, Janez Čuk, Elvira Kralj	romantic comedy	Followed by a sequel Ne čakaj na maj
1954
1955
Trenutki odločitve (Moments of Decision)	František Čáp	Stane Sever	war drama	
Tri zgodbe (Three Stories)	Jane Kavčič		drama	
1956
Dolina miru (The Valley of Peace)	France Štiglic	Tugo Štiglic, Eveline Wohlfeiler, John Kitzmiller	war drama	Best actor award (John Kitzmiller) and Palme d'Or nomination at the 1957 Cannes Film Festival
1957
Ne čakaj na maj (Don't Whisper)	František Čáp	Metka Gabrijelčič, Franek Trefalt, Elvira Kralj, Stane Sever	romantic comedy	Sequel to Vesna
1958
Dobro morje (The Good Sea)	Mirko Grobler	Janez Vrhovec, Stane Potokar	drama	
Kala	Krešimir Golik, Andrej Hieng	Jure Doležal	war drama/ family adventure	
1959
Dobri stari pianino (The Good Old Piano)	France Kosmač	Frane Milčinski - Ježek, Vida Kuhar	war drama	
Tri četrtine sonca (Three Quarters of the Sun)	Jože Babič	Arnold Tovornik, Bert Sotlar, Lojze Potokar	drama	

== 1960s ==
Title	Director	Principal cast	Genre	Notes
1960
Veselica (The Feast)	Jože Babič	Miha Baloh, Velimir Gjurin, Mira Sardoč	romance/drama	
Akcija (Action)	Jane Kavčič	Lojze Rozman, Aleksander Valič, Stane Potokar, Janez Albreht, Branko Pleša, Arnold Tovornik	war film	
1961
Nočni izlet (Night Trip)	Mirko Grobler	Primož Rode, Špela Rozin	drama	
Ples v dežju (Dance in the Rain)	Boštjan Hladnik	Miha Baloh, Duša Počkaj	drama	
Balada o trobenti in oblaku (The Ballad of the Trumpet and the Cloud)	France Štiglic	Lojze Potokar	war drama	
Družinski dnevnik (Family Diary)	Jože Gale		comedy	
1962
Minuta za umor (A Minute for Murder)	Jane Kavčič	Demeter Bitenc, Vanja Drach, Zlatko Madunič, Duša Počkaj, Lojze Rozman	drama	
Naš avto (Our Car)	František Čáp		comedy	
Peščeni grad (The Castle of Sand)	Boštjan Hladnik	Milena Dravić, Ali Raner, Ljubiša Samardžić	drama	
Tistega lepega dne (That Beautiful Day)	France Štiglic	Bert Sotlar, Marija Šeme, Duša Počkaj	comedy	
1963
Srečno, Kekec! (Good Luck, Kekec)	Jože Gale	Velimir Gjurin, Marin Mele, Ruša Bojc	youth adventure	The first Slovenian color film
Samorastniki (Wildlings)	Igor Pretnar	Rudi Kosmač, Majda Potokar	historical drama	
1964
Ne joči, Peter (Don't Cry, Peter)	France Štiglic		war film/ youth adventure	
1965
Lažnivka (Liar)	Igor Pretnar	Majda Potokar, Irena Prosen, Vera Šipov, Angelca Hlebce, Dušan Antonijević, Bata Živojinović	drama	
Lucija (Lucia)	France Kosmač	Alenka Vipotnik	drama	
Po isti poti se ne vračaj (Don't Come Back by the Same Way)	Jože Babič		drama	
1966
Amandus	France Štiglic	Boris Kralj	historical drama	
1967
Grajski biki (Thugs from the Castle)	Jože Pogačnik		drama	
Na papirnatih avionih (On Wings of Paper)	Matjaž Klopčič		drama	
Nevidni bataljon (The Invisible Battalion)	Jane Kavčič		war film	
Zgodba, ki je ni (On the Run)	Matjaž Klopčič	Polde Bibič, Mirko Bogataj, Vinko Hrastelj, Milena Dravić	drama	
1968
Kekčeve ukane (Kekec's Tricks)	Jože Gale	Zlatko Krasnič, Boris Ivanovski, Jasna Krofak, Milorad Radovič, Polde Bibič	youth adventure	
Sončni krik (The Shout of the Sun)	Boštjan Hladnik		action/comedy	
Peta zaseda (The Fifth Ambush)	France Kosmač	Tone Gogala, Boris Cavazza	war film	
1969
Sedmina (Funeral Feast)	Matjaž Klopčič	Rade Šerbedžija, Snežana Nikšić, Milena Dravić, Mirko Bogataj, Relja Bašić, Tone Slodnjak	war film	

== 1970s ==
Title	Director	Principal cast	Genre	Notes
1970
Onkraj (Beyond)	Jože Gale	Janez Škof	drama	
Rdeče Klasje (Red Wheat)	Živojin Pavlović		drama	
1971
Maškarada (Masquerade)	Boštjan Hladnik	Vida Jerman, Miha Baloh, Igor Galo	erotic drama	Considered pornography and heavily censored at first, integral version was only shown in 1982
Mrtva ladja (Death Ship)	Rajko Ranfl	Franc Uršič, Polde Bibič	romance/horror/mystery	
1972
Ko pride lev (The Lion is Coming)	Boštjan Hladnik	Marko Simčič, Milena Dravić, Marina Urbanc	comedy/romance	
1973
Begunec (The Fugitive)	Jane Kavčič		war drama	
Cvetje v jeseni (Blossoms in Autumn)	Matjaž Klopčič	Polde Bibič, Milena Zupančič	romance	
Let mrtve ptice (The Flight of Dead Bird)	Živojin Pavlović		drama	
Ljubezen na odru (Love on the Furrows)	Vojko Duletič	Metka Franko, Iztok Jereb, Aleksander Valič	romance/drama	
Pastirci (Little Shepherds)	France Štiglic	Bogo Ropotar, Ksenija Sinur, Miha Levstek, Andrej Čevka	youth drama	
1974
Pomladni veter (Spring Wind)	Rajko Ranfl	Mirjana Nikolić, Marinko Šebez	romance	
Strah (Fear)	Matjaž Klopčič			
1975
Čudoviti prah (Wonderful Dust)	Milan Ljubić	Ljubiša Samardžić, Silvo Božič	war drama	
Med strahom in dolžnostjo (Between Fear and Duty)	Vojko Duletič	Demeter Bitenc, Marjeta Gregorac, Angelca Hlebce	war drama	
Povest o dobrih ljudeh (The Story of Good People)	France Štiglic	Olga Kacjan, Bata Živojinović, Karel Pogorelec, Elvira Kralj	drama	
1976
Idealist	Igor Pretnar	Radko Polič, Milena Zupančič	drama	
Vdovstvo Karoline Žašler (The Widowhood of Karolina Žašler)	Matjaž Klopčič	Milena Zupančič, Zlatko Šugman, Polde Bibič	drama	Nominated for Golden Bear at the 27th Berlin International Film Festival.
1977
Sreča na vrvici (Hang on, Doggy)	Jane Kavčič	Matjaž Gruden, Nino de Gleria, Vesna Jevnikar	youth comedy	
To so gadi (Real Pests)	Jože Bevc	Bert Sotlar, Dare Valič, Majda Potokar	comedy	
1978
Ko zorijo jagode (Strawberry Time)	Rajko Ranfl	Irena Kranjc, Roman Goršič, Metod Pevec	youth romance	
Praznovanje pomladi (Spring Celebration)	France Štiglic	Zvone Agrež, Zvezdana Mlakar, Radko Polič	historical drama	
1979
Draga moja Iza (My Dear Iza)	Vojko Duletič	Zvone Hribar, Judita Zidar	drama	
Iskanja (Temptations)	Matjaž Klopčič	Boris Cavazza, Boris Juh	drama	
Krč (Spasm)	Božo Šprajc	Ivo Ban		
Ubij me nežno (Kill Me Tenderly)	Boštjan Hladnik	Duša Počkaj, Janez Starina, Miranda Caharija, Igor Samobor, Marina Urbanc	drama	

== 1980s ==
Title	Director	Principal cast	Genre	Notes
1980
Nasvidenje v naslednji vojni (See You in the Next War)	Živojin Pavlović	Metod Pevec, Hans Christian Blech	war drama	
Prestop (Transgression)	Matija Milčinski	Mirko Bogataj	drama	
Splav meduze (The Raft of Medusa)	Karpo Godina	Olga Kacjan, Vladislava Milosavljević, Boris Komnenić	drama	
1981
Boj na požiralniku (Battle at Požiralnik)	Janez Drozg		drama	
Krizno obdobje (The Time of Crisis)	Franci Slak	Ana Avbar, Roberto Batelli, Peter Božič, Tanja Premk, Joži Prepeluh, Dušanka Ristič	drama	
1982
Deseti brat (The Tenth Brother)	Vojko Duletič	Matjaž Višnar, Jana Habjan, Radko Polič	historical drama	
Pustota (Wasteland)	Jože Gale		historical drama	
Razseljena oseba (Displaced Person)	Marjan Ciglič	Matjaž Višnar, Ivo Ban	drama	
Rdeči boogie ali Kaj ti je deklica (Red Boogie)	Karpo Godina	Boris Cavazza, Ivo Ban, Jožef Ropoša	drama	
Učna leta izumitelja Polža (Apprenticeship of the Inventor Polž)	Jane Kavčič	Miha Petrovčič, Tanja Vrenk, Bogdan Zupan	comedy	
1983
Dih (A Breath of Air)	Božo Šprajc	Draga Potočnjak, Ivo Ban, Faruk Begolli	drama/thriller	
Eva	Franci Slak	Miranda Caharija	drama	
1984
Dediščina (Heritage)	Matjaž Klopčič	Ivo Ban, Majda Potokar	drama	
Leta odločitve (The Years of Decision)	Boštjan Vrhovec	Boris Ostan, Boris Cavazza, Damjana Černe	drama	
Ljubezen (Love)	Rajko Ranfl	Rok Bogataj, Vesna Jevnikar, Bernarda Gašperčič	war drama	
Veselo gostivanje (The Merry Wedding)	France Štiglic	Danilo Benedičič, Polde Bibič, Zvezdana Mlakar, Lojze Rozman, Igor Samobor, Bert Sotlar	romance	
1985
Butnskala (Bumpstone)	Franci Slak	Emil Filipčič, Marko Derganc, Janez Hočevar	comedy	
Christophoros	Andrej Mlakar	Milena Zupančič, Radko Polič, Boris Juh		
Doktor (Doctor)	Vojko Duletič	Slavko Cerjak	historical drama	
Naš človek (Our Man)	Jože Pogačnik	Boris Juh	drama	
Ovni in mamuti (Rams and Mammoths)	Filip Robar Dorin	Božidar Bunjevac, Marko Derganc, Blaž Ogorevc, Slavko Štimac, Zlatko Zajc	drama	Grand prize at the International Filmfestival Mannheim-Heidelberg
1986
Čas brez pravljic (Times Devoid of Fairy Tales)	Boštjan Hladnik	Bernarda Gašperčič, Boris Kerč, Damjan Koren, Boštjan Omerza, Ana Pretnar		
Heretik (Heretic)	Andrej Stojan			
Kormoran (A Cormoran)	Anton Tomašič	Boris Cavazza	drama	
Poletje v školjki (A Summer in a Sea-Shell)	Tugo Štiglic	David Sluga, Boris Kralj	youth	Golden Griffon at the Giffoni Film Festival, followed by the sequel Poletje v školjki 2
1987
Čisto pravi gusar (A Real Pirate)	Marcel Buh	Janez Albreht, Ivo Ban, Rok Bogataj	youth adventure	
Hudodelci (The Felons)	Franci Slak	Mario Šelih, Anja Rupel, Bata Živojinović, Rade Šerbedžija, Elizabeth Spender	drama	Entered into the 38th Berlin International Film Festival
Ljubezen nam je vsem v pogubo (Love is the Ruin of Us All)	Jože Gale	Jožica Avbelj, Marija Benko, Boris Cavazza, Silva Čušin, Slavka Glavina, Silvij Kobal		Also recreated as a TV miniseries with the same title
Ljubezni Blanke Kolak (Blanka Kolak's Love)	Boris Jurjaševič	Mira Furlan, Mustafa Nadarević, Peter Boštjančič	drama	
Moj ata, socialistični kulak (My Dad, the Socialist Kulak)	Matjaž Klopčič	Ivo Ban, Polde Bibič, Ivan Godnič, Urška Hlebec, Matjaž Partlič, Anton Petje, Milena Zupančič	tragicomedy	
Živela svoboda (Long Live Freedom)	Rajko Ranfl	Boris Juh	drama	
1988
Maja in vesoljček (Maja and the Starboy)	Jane Kavčič	Dario Ajdovec, Ana Papež	youth sci-fi	
Odpadnik (The Maverick)	Božo Šprajc	Ivo Ban	drama	
Poletje v školjki 2 (A Summer in a Sea-Shell)	Tugo Štiglic	David Sluga, Kaja Štiglic	youth	Sequel to Poletje v školjki
Remington	Damjan Kozole	Mario Šelih, Lara Bohinc, Rasim Softić	drama	
1989
Coprnica Zofka (Sophie the Witch)	Matija Milčinski	voices by Ljerka Belak, Janez Bončina Benč, Janez Hočevar, Vlado Kreslin, Svetlana Makarovič, Ivanka Mežan, Alenka Vidrih, Nada Žgur	live-action puppet film	
Kavarna Astoria (Cafe Astoria)	Jože Pogačnik	Janez Hočevar, Lidija Kozlovič, Branko Šturbej	drama	
Nekdo drug (Someone Else)	Boštjan Vrhovec	Marko Mlačnik, Barbara Lapajne, Gojmir Lešnjak	drama	
Veter v mreži (The Windhunter)	Filip Robar Dorin	Milan Štefe	drama	

== 1990s ==
Title	Director	Principal cast	Genre	Notes
1990
Decembrski dež (December Rain)	Božo Šprajc	Ljerka Belak, Danilo Benedičič, Demeter Bitenc	romance/drama	
Do konca in naprej (To the Limit and Beyond)	Jure Pervanje	Matjaž Tribušon, Janez Hočevar	crime/comedy	
Ječarji (The Jailers)	Marjan Ciglič	Jože Babič, Ivo Ban, Danilo Benedičič	fantastic fiction	
Umetni raj (Artificial paradise)	Karpo Godina	Jurgen Morche, Vlado Novak, Dragana Mrkić	drama	
1991
Babica gre na jug (Grandma Goes South)	Vinci Vogue Anžlovar	Majolka Šuklje, Bojan Emeršič, Nataša Matjašec	drama	The first feature film in independent Slovenia
Operacija Cartier (Operation Cartier)	Miran Zupanič	Faruk Begolli, Haris Burina, Urška Hlebec, Srečo Špik, Borut Veselko, Judita Zidar	black comedy	
1992
1993
Kdo bo koga	Igor Šmid	Majda Potokar, Danilo Benedičič, Maja Končar, Roman Končar, Iztok Mlakar, Jernej Šugman, Janja Majzelj, Branko Šturbej, Mirjam Korbar, Meta Vranič	comedy	
Ko zaprem oči (When I Close My Eyes)	Franci Slak	Petra Govc, Mario Šelih	crime/romance/thriller	Slovenian submission to the 66th Academy Awards for Best Foreign Language Film
Morana	Aleš Verbič		horror/mystery/thriller	Slovenian submission to the 67th Academy Awards for Best Foreign Language Film
1994
Halgato	Andrej Mlakar	Jože Kramberger, Vlado Kreslin, Mirjam Korbar	drama	
Morana	Aleš Verbič			
1995
Carmen	Metod Pevec	Nataša Barbara Gračner, Sebastijan Cavazza	drama	
Ekspres, ekspres (Express, Express)	Igor Šterk	Gregor Baković, Barbara Cerar, Gregor Čušin, Marko Mandič, Peter Musevski, Andrej Rozman - Roza, Lojze Rozman, Tomaž Gubenšek	drama	
1996
Felix	Božo Šprajc	Feliks Žnidarčič, Milena Zupančič	war drama	Slovenian submission to the 69th Academy Awards for Best Foreign Language Film
1997
Outsider	Andrej Košak	Davor Janjić, Nina Ivanič	drama	Slovenian submission to the 70th Academy Awards for Best Foreign Language Film
1998
Socializacija bika? (Socializing The Bull?)	Zvonko Čoh, Milan Erih		comedy/animated	The first animated feature film in Slovenia
1999
Blues za Saro (Blues For Sarah)	Boris Jurjaševič	Bojan Emeršič, Nataša Barbara Gračner, Metka Trdin, Ljubiša Samardžić	detective/comedy	
V leru (Idle Running)	Janez Burger	Matjaž Javšnik	comedy	

== 2000s ==
Title	Director	Principal cast	Genre	Notes
2000
Jebiga (Fuck It)	Miha Hočevar		comedy	
Nepopisan list (What Now, Luka?)	Jane Kavčič	Jan Grilanc, Iva Štefančič, Tanja Ribič	youth	
Porno Film	Damjan Kozole	Matjaž Latin, Primož Petkovšek	drama	
V petek zvečer (Friday Night)	Danijel Sraka	Primož Rokavc, Katarina Čas, Primož Preksavec, Tina Cvek, Tadej Čapeljnik, Manja Plešnar, Jernej Kuntner	comedy	
2001
Barabe!	Miran Zupanič			
Kruh in mleko (Bread and Milk)	Jan Cvitkovič	Peter Musevski, Sonja Savić, Tadej Troha	drama	Slovenian submission to the 74th Academy Awards for Best Foreign Language Film; Golden Lion of the Future award at the 58th Venice International Film Festival.
Poker	Vinci Vogue Anžlovar	Borut Veselko, Urša Božič, Roberto Magnifico, Pavle Ravnohrib	drama	
Sladke sanje (Sweet Dreams)	Sašo Podgoršek	Janko Mandič	drama	FIPRESCI award at the 2002 Festroia International Film Festival
2002
Amir	Miha Čelar	Uroš Fürst, Marko Miladinovič	drama	
Zvenenje v glavi (Headnoise)	Andrej Košak	Jernej Šugman	drama	Slovenian submission to the 75th Academy Awards for Best Foreign Language Film
Ljubljana (Ljubljana)	Igor Šterk	Grega Zorc, Tjaša Železnik, Jaka Ivanc	drama	
Pozabljeni zaklad	Tugo Štiglic			
Šelestenje (Rustling Landscapes)	Janez Lapajne	Barbara Cerar, Rok Vihar, Grega Zorc, Maša Derganc, Mateja Koležnik	drama	
Varuh meje (Guardian of the Frontier)	Maja Weiss	Iva Krajnc, Tanja Potočnik, Pia Zemljič, Jonas Žnidaršič	drama	
Zgodba gospoda P. F. (The Story of Mr. P. F.)	Karpo Godina		documentary	
2003
Kajmak in marmelada (Cheese and Jam)	Branko Đurić	Branko Đurić, Tanja Ribič, Dragan Bjelogrlić	comedy	
Na planincah	Miha Hočevar	Filip Đurić, Saša Tabaković	comedy	
Pesnikov portret z dvojnikom	Franci Slak	Pavle Ravnohrib	costume drama	
Pod njenim oknom (Beneath Her Window)	Metod Pevec			Slovenian submission to the 77th Academy Awards for Best Foreign Language Film
Rezervni deli (Spare Parts)	Damjan Kozole	Aljoša Kovačič	drama	Slovenian submission to the 76th Academy Awards for Best Foreign Language Film
2004
Delo osvobaja (Labour Equals Freedom)	Damjan Kozole	Peter Musevski, Nataša Barbara Gračner	drama	
Dergi in Roza: V kraljestvu svizca (Alpenpolka)	Boris Jurjaševič	Marko Derganc, Andrej Rozman - Roza, Bojan Emeršič, Jernej Šugman	comedy	
Ruševine (The Ruins)	Janez Burger	Nataša Matjašec, Matjaž Tribušon	drama	Slovenian submission to the 78th Academy Awards for Best Foreign Language Film
Tu pa tam (Here and There)	Mitja Okorn	Klemen Bučan, Miki Bubulj, Toni Cahunek, Adnan Omerović	youth/crime/comedy	
2005
Ljubljana je ljubljena	Matjaž Klopčič	Nataša Barbara Gračner		Dedicated to the hundredth anniversary of Slovenian film, the sixtieth anniversary of Ljubljana's freedom and to Rudi Šeligo
Uglaševanje (Tuning)	Igor Šterk	Peter Musevski, Nataša Burger	drama	Grand prize at the International Filmfestival Mannheim-Heidelberg
Odgrobadogroba (Gravehopping)	Jan Cvitkovič	Mojca Fatur		Slovenian submission to the 79th Academy Awards for Best Foreign Language Film
2006
Estrellita - Pesem za domov	Metod Pevec	Silva Čušin, Tadej Troha	drama	
Kratki stiki (Short Circuits)	Janez Lapajne	Tjaša Železnik, Grega Zorc, Jernej Šugman, Sebastijan Cavazza, Boris Cavazza, Mojca Funkl, Vito Taufer, Maša Derganc, Primož Ekart, Uroš Smolej, Matija Vastl, Igor Dragar, Tim Dekleva	drama	Slovenian submission to the 80th Academy Awards for Best Foreign Language Film
Noč (Let Me Sleep)	Miha Knific	Naida Raimova, Henrik Walgeborg, Christina Luoma	drama	
Tea (Teah)	Hanna Slak	Nikolaj Burger, Pina Bitenc	fantastic fiction	
2007
Otroci s Petrička	Miran Zupanič		documentary	
Petelinji zajtrk (Rooster's breakfast)	Marko Naberšnik	Primož Bezjak, Vlado Novak, Pia Zemljič		Slovenian submission to the 81st Academy Awards for Best Foreign Language Film
Instalacija ljubezni (Installation of love)	Maja Weiss	Bernarda Oman, Igor Samobor, Desa Muck, Andrej Rozman - Roza		
2008
Dar Fur - Vojna za vodo (Dar Fur - War for Water)	Tomo Križnar, Maja Weiss		documentary	
Lajf	Vito Taufer	Tjaša Železnik	drama	
Morje v času mrka (The Sea at the Time of the Eclipse)	Jure Pervanje	Boris Cavazza	drama	
Pokrajina Št. 2 (Landscape No. 2)	Vinko Möderndorfer	Marko Mandić, Janez Hočevar, Slobodan Ćustić		Slovenian submission to the 82nd Academy Awards for Best Foreign Language Film
Za vedno (Forever)	Damjan Kozole	Marjuta Slamič, Dejan Spasić	drama	
2009
9:06	Igor Šterk	Igor Samobor, Silva Čušin	thriller	Slovenian submission to the 83rd Academy Awards for Best Foreign Language Film
Distorzija (Distortion)	Miha Hočevar	Žan Perko, Nataša Tič Ralijan, Robert Prebil, Jure Dolamič, Jani Vrhovnik, Domen Verovšek, Anita Barišič, Katja Škofic	youth drama	
Osebna prtljaga (Personal Baggage)	Janez Lapajne	Klemen Slakonja, Nataša Barbara Gračner, Branko Završan, Boris Cavazza, Nina Rakovec	drama	
Slovenka (Slovenian Girl)	Damjan Kozole	Nina Ivanišin	drama	

== 2010s ==
Title	Director	Principal cast	Genre	Notes
2010
Circus Fantasticus (Silent Sonata)	Janez Burger	Leon Lučev, Ravil Sultanov, Pauliina Räsänen	war drama	
Gremo mi po svoje (Let's go our own way)	Miha Hočevar	Jurij Zrnec, Tadej Koren Šmid, Jure Kreft, Matevz Štular, Jana Zupančič, Luka Cimprič, Uroš Kavrin	youth adventure	
Oča (Dad)	Vlado Škafar	Milivoj Roš, Sandi Šalamon	drama	
Piran - Pirano	Goran Vojnović	Mustafa Nadarević, Boris Cavazza, Nina Ivanišin	drama	
Stanje šoka (The State of Shock)	Andrej Košak		drama	
2011
Arheo (Archeo)	Jan Cvitkovič	Niko Novak, Medea Novak, Tommaso Finzi	drama	
Izlet (A Trip)	Nejc Gazvoda	Nina Rakovec, Jure Henigman, Luka Cimprič	drama	
Lahko noč, gospodična (Good Night, Missy)	Metod Pevec	Polona Juh, Jernej Šugman	drama	
2012
My Name Is Janez Janša	Janez Janša	Janez Janša, Janez Janša, Janez Janša	art/documentary	
2013
Gremo mi po svoje 2 (Let's go our own way 2)	Miha Hočevar	Jurij Zrnec, Tadej Toš, Tadej Koren Šmid, Jure Kreft, Matevz Štular, Jana Zupančič, Luka Cimprič, Sabina Kogovšek, Uroš Kavrin,	youth adventure	
2014
The Kids from the Marx and Engels Street	Nikola Vukčević	Momcilo Otasevic	Drama	
The Reaper	Zvonimir Jurić	Ivo Gregurevic	Drama	
The Tree	Sonja Prosenc	Katarina Stegnar	Drama	
2015
Idila	Tomaž Gorkič	Nina Ivanisin, Sebastian Cavazza	horror film	
2016
Houston, We Have a Problem!	Ziga Virc		mockumentary	
2018
Consequences (Posledice)	Darko Štante	Matej Zemljič, Timon Šturbej, Gašper Markun	Drama	

== 2020s ==
Title	Director	Principal cast	Genre	Notes
2020
2024
Family Therapy	Sonja Prosenc	Mila Bezjak, Aliocha Schneider, Marko Mandić	Dark comedy	
2025
Little Trouble Girls (Kaj ti je deklica)	Urška Djukić	Jara Sofija Ostan, Mina Švajger	Drama	Premiere at the Berlinale 2025.
Sandbag Dam (Zajčji nasip)	Čejen Černić Čanak	Lav Novosel, Andrija Žunac, Leon Grgić, Franka Mikolaci, Tanja Smoje	Drama	Premiere at the Berlinale 2025.

== Other notable productions ==
Other films, partially or indirectly, but significantly linked with Slovenia in terms of production.

- No Man's Land (2001) - Bosnian-Slovenian-Italian-French-Belgian-British co-production
- The World is Big and Salvation Lurks Around the Corner (2008) - Bulgarian-Slovenian-German-Hungarian co-production
- The Chronicles of Narnia: Prince Caspian (2008) - significant parts were shot on location near Bovec, Slovenia

== See also ==
- Cinema of the world
- List of Slovenian submissions for the Academy Award for Best Foreign Language Film
