= List of Slovenian film directors =

A list of notable film directors from Slovenia:

== A ==
- Karpo Ačimović Godina
- Vinci Vogue Anžlovar

== B ==
- Jože Babič
- Janez Burger

== C ==
- Jan Cvitkovič

== Č ==
- František Čap

== D ==
- Janez Drozg

== G ==
- Nejc Gazvoda

== H ==
- Boštjan Hladnik

== K ==
- Matjaž Klopčič
- Damjan Kozole

== L ==
- Janez Lapajne

== M ==
- Rene Maurin

== P ==
- Jože Pogačnik
- Igor Pretnar

== R ==
- Filip Robar Dorin
- Franček Rudolf

== S ==
- Franci Slak
- Danijel Sraka

== Š ==
- France Štiglic

== V ==
- Goran Vojnović
