= Golden Arena for Best Actress =

- Awarded for: "Performance by an actress in a leading role"
- Country: Yugoslavia (1955–1990); Croatia (1992–present)
- Presented by: Pula Film Festival Jury
- First award: 1955
- Currently held by: Tihana Lazović (2023)
- Website: Official Website

The following is a list of winners of the Golden Arena for Best Actress at the Pula Film Festival.

== List of winners ==
=== Yugoslav Film Awards (1955–90) ===
Year	Winner	English title	Original title
1955	Tamara Marković	The Girl and the Oak	Djevojka i hrast
1956	Not awarded		
1957	Ljubinka Bobić	Priests Ćira and Spira	Pop Ćira i pop Spira
1958	Not awarded		
1959	Olga Spiridonović	Miss Stone	Mis Ston
1960	Dušica Žegarac	The Ninth Circle	Deveti krug
1961	Duša Počkaj	Dancing in the Rain	Ples v dežju
1962	Milena Dravić		Prekobrojna
1963	Majda Potokar	Wild Growth	Samorastniki
1964	Olivera Marković		Službeni položaj
1965	Majda Potokar (2)		Lažnivka
1966	Mira Stupica		Roj
1967	Not awarded		
1968	Mia Oremović	I Have Two Mothers and Two Fathers	Imam dvije mame i dva tate
1969	Radmila Andrić		Moja strana svijeta
1970	Milena Dravić (2)	The Cyclists	Biciklisti
1971	Dušica Žegarac (2)		Opklada
1972	Božidarka Frajt		Živa istina
1973	Ružica Sokić		Žuta
1974	Majda Grbac		Let mrtve ptice
1975	Jagoda Kaloper	The House	Kuća
1976	Milena Zupančič	Idealist	Idealist
1977	Milena Zupančič (2)	The Widowhood of Karolina Zasler	Vdovstvo Karoline Žašler
1978	Svetlana Bojković	The Dog Who Loved Trains	Pas koji je voleo vozove
1979	Gorica Popović	National Class Category Up to 785 ccm	Nacionalna klasa do 785 cm^{3}
1980	Mirjana Karanović	Petria's Wreath	Petrijin vijenac
1981	Mira Banjac		Široko je lišće
1982	Jelisaveta Sablić	The Marathon Family	Maratonci trče počasni krug
1983	Ljiljana Međeši	Body Scent	Zadah tela
1984	Sonja Savić	Sugar Water	Šećerna vodica
1985	Mirjana Karanović (2)	When Father Was Away on Business	Otac na službenom putu
1986	Mira Furlan	The Beauty of Sin	Lepota poroka
1987	Anica Dobra	Reflections	Već viđeno
1988	Neda Arnerić	Aloa: Festivity of the Whores	Haloa - praznik kurvi
1989	Snežana Bogdanović	Kuduz	Kuduz
1990	Mirjana Joković		Granica

=== Croatian Film Awards (1990–present) ===
Year	Winner	English title	Original title
1991	Festival cancelled.^{[A]}		
1992	Mirta Zečević	Luka	Luka
1993	Alma Prica	Countess Dora	Kontesa Dora
1994	National competition program cancelled.^{[B]}		
1995	Katarina Bistrović-Darvaš	Washed Out	Isprani
1996	Nataša Dorčić	Prepoznavanje	Prepoznavanje
1997	Ena Begović	Treća žena	Treća žena
1998	Sandra Lončarić	Delusion	Zavaravanje
1999	Lucija Šerbedžija	Madonna	Bogorodica
2000	Dora Polić	Cashier Wants to Go to the Seaside	Blagajnica hoće ići na more
2001	Lucija Šerbedžija (2)	Slow Surrender	Polagana predaja
2002	Leona Paraminski	Winter in Rio	Prezimiti u Riu
2003	Alma Prica (2)	Witnesses	Svjedoci
2004	Darija Lorenci	Sorry for Kung Fu	Oprosti za kung fu
2005	Anja Šovagović-Despot	What Iva Recorded	Što je Iva snimila 21. listopada 2003.
2006	Zrinka Cvitešić	What Is a Man Without a Moustache?	Što je muškarac bez brkova
2007	Nataša Dorčić (2)	I Have to Sleep, My Angel	Moram spavat', anđele
2008	Jadranka Đokić	Behind the Glass	Iza stakla
2009	Dijana Vidušin	Love Life of a Gentle Coward	Ljubavni život domobrana
2010	Marija Škaričić	Mother of Asphalt	Majka asfalta
2011	Mirela Brekalo	Kotlovina	Kotlovina
2012	Ana Karić	Night Boats	Noćni brodovi
2013	Nada Đurevska	A Stranger	Obrana i zaštita
2014	Areta Ćurković	Happy Endings	Happy Endings
2015	Tihana Lazović	The High Sun	Zvizdan
2016	Ksenija Marinković	On the Other Side	S one strane
2017	Mia Petričević	Quit Staring at My Plate	Ne gledaj mi u pijat
2018	Doris Šarić-Kukuljica	Lada Kamenski	Lada Kamenski
2019	Hristina Popović	The Last Serb in Croatia	Posljednji Srbin u Hrvatskoj
2020	Daria Lorenci Flatz (2)	Matriarch	Mater
2021	Vanja Ćirić	A Blue Flower	Plavi cvijet
2022	Lana Barić	The Head of a Big Fish	Glava velike ribe
2023	Tihana Lazović (2)	Only When I Laugh	Samo kad se smijem
2024	Lana Barić	This Is Not A Love Song	Šlager
2025	Nina Violić	Good Children	Dobra djeca
2026	Snježana Sinovčić-Šiškov	Honey Bunny	Koke

== Footnotes ==
A. Although the festival was opened on 26 July 1991 and a press screening of Zrinko Ogresta's film Fragments: Chronicle of a Vanishing was held, the festival board presided by Antun Vrdoljak decided to cancel the festival in protest against the violence of the Ten-Day War which was going on in Slovenia and the initial stages of the Croatian War of Independence. Nine films were supposed to be screened in the competition program.

B.: The awards ceremony was cancelled in 1994 as only one Croatian feature film was made in the preceding 12 months (The Price of Life directed by Bogdan Žižić). The festival was held in spite of this, but the usual national competition program was replaced with a retrospective of animated films produced by the Zagreb School of Animated Film and a selection of documentaries, while the main program featured premieres of six American wide release movies.

== Multiple winners ==
The following actresses have received multiple awards. The list is sorted by the number of total awards. Years in bold indicate wins in Yugoslav competition (1955–1990).

- 2 : Majda Potokar (**1963**, **1965**)
- 2 : Milena Dravić (**1962**, **1970**)
- 2 : Dušica Žegarac (**1960**, **1971**)
- 2 : Milena Zupančič (**1976**, **1977**)
- 2 : Mirjana Karanović (**1980**, **1985**)
- 2 : Lucija Šerbedžija (1999, 2001)
- 2 : Alma Prica (1993, 2003)
- 2 : Nataša Dorčić (1996, 2007)
- 2 : Daria Lorenci Flatz (2004, 2020)
- 2 : Tihana Lazović (2015, 2023)
- 2 : Lana Barić (2022, 2024)
