= Štefka Drolc =

Slovenian actress (1923–2018)

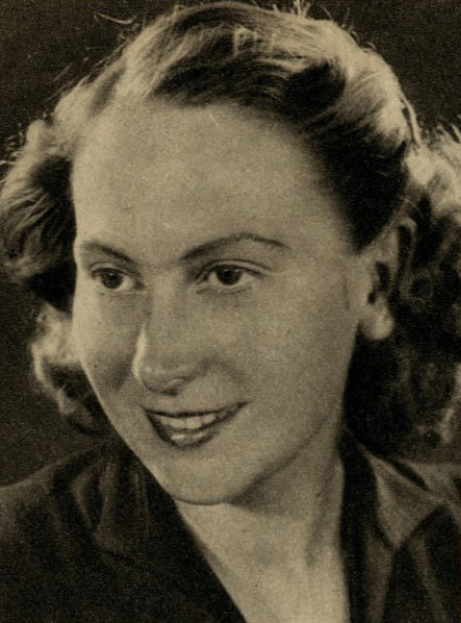
- Born: Štefanija Ana Drolc; 22 December 1923; Ponikva, Kingdom of Serbs, Croats, and Slovenes
- Died: 25 June 2018 (aged 94)
- Occupation: Actress
- Years active: 1945–2018

Štefka Drolc (22 December 1923 – 25 June 2018), full name Štefanija Ana Drolc, was one of the most widely recognised Slovenian theatre and film actresses.

== Life ==
Štefka Drolc was born in Ponikva (now in eastern Slovenia). She started her acting career in Maribor. In the 1945/46 season, after several successful seasons as an amateur actress, she started to work in the Maribor National Theatre. In 1948, she moved to Trieste and remained there until the end of the 1958/59 season. Since 1960, she was a full member of the Ljubljana Slovene National Theatre Drama.

As a film actress, she debuted in the movie On Our Own Land, which was the first feature-length sound film in Slovene. She also starred in Blossoms in Autumn (Cvetje v jeseni; 1973), The Story of Good People (Povest o dobrih ljudeh; 1975) and The Tenth Brother (Deseti brat; 1982).

She worked as a teacher at the Academy of Theatre, Radio, Film and Television (AGFRT) in Ljubljana.

For her work, she was bestowed the Prešeren Award (2009) for lifetime achievement and the Silver Order of Freedom (1996).

She was married to the film director Jože Babič. She died at age 94.
