= List of Prešeren Award laureates =

Prešeren laureates are Slovene scientists and artists who have been awarded the Prešeren Award for their achievements. The Prešeren Award is the highest decoration in the field of artistic and in the past also scientific creation in Slovenia. It is awarded annually by the Prešeren Fund (Prešernov sklad). It has been bestowed since 1947.

							1947	1948	1949
1950	1951	1952	1953	1954	1955	1956	1957	1958	1959
1960	1961	1962	1963	1964	1965	1966	1967	1968	1969
1970	1971	1972	1973	1974	1975	1976	1977	1978	1979
1980	1981	1982	1983	1984	1985	1986	1987	1988	1989
1990	1991	1992	1993	1994	1995	1996	1997	1998	1999
2000	2001	2002	2003	2004	2005	2006	2007	2008	2009
2010	2011	2012	2013	2014	2015	2016

== 1947 ==
Recipient	Occupation	Rationale
Blaž Arnič	composer	for the composition The Woods are Singing (Slovene: Gozdovi pojejo)
Matej Bor	poet, playwright, translator, journalist	for the play False Flaggers (Raztrganci)
Igo Gruden	poet, translator	for the collections Into Exile (V pregnanstvo) and The Poet's Heart (Pesnikovo srce)
Božidar Jakac	painter, graphic artist, photographer, filmmaker	for the collection of drawings titled In the Tracks of the 4th and the 5th Offensive (Po sledovih 4. in 5. ofenzive)
Boris Kalin	sculptor	for the sculpture Fifteen-Year-Old Girl (Petnajstletna)
Gojmir Anton Kos	painter, photographer	for the oil painting Girl with an Accordion (Dekle s harmoniko)
Anton Melik	geographer	for the work The Ljubljana Pile-Dweller's Lake and Its Heritage (Ljubljansko mostiščarsko jezero in dediščina po njem)
Ivan Potrč	writer, playwright	for the drama The Krefl Farm (Kreflova kmetija)
Tone Seliškar	writer, poet, journalist, teacher	for the story Comrades (Tovariši)
Lucijan Marija Škerjanc	composer, conductor, pedagogue, pianist	for the Concerto for Violin and Orchestra (Koncert za violino in orkester)
Vitomil Zupan	writer, poet, playwright, essayist	for the drama Birth in a Storm (Rojstvo v nevihti)

== 2000 ==
Recipient	Occupation	Rationale
Svetlana Makarovič	poet, writer and actress	for her poetic opus
Marko Ivan Rupnik	mosaic artist and theologian	for his work in the Redemptoris Mater Chapel

== 2001 ==
Recipient	Occupation	Rationale
Gustav Gnamuš	painter	for his painting opus

== 2002 ==
Recipient	Occupation	Rationale
Vinko Globokar	trombonist and composer	for his lifetime achievement in music
Milan Jesih	poet, playwright and translator	for his poetic opus

== 2003 ==
Recipient	Occupation	Rationale
Vojteh Ravnikar	architect	for his architectural opus
Zlatko Šugman	actor	for his lifetime achievement in the dramatic arts

== 2004 ==
Recipient	Occupation	Rationale
Florjan Lipuš	writer and translator	for his literary opus

== 2005 ==
Recipient	Occupation	Rationale
Bogdan Borčič	painter	for his lifetime opus
Irena Grafenauer	flute player and soloist	for her excellence in music

== 2006 ==
Recipient	Occupation	Rationale
Milan Dekleva	poet and writer	for his lifetime achievement in poetry and writing
Karpo Godina	cinematographer and film director	for his lifetime achievement in film

== 2007 ==
Recipient	Occupation	Rationale
Janez Matičič	composer and pianist	for his lifetime achievement music
Radko Polič	actor	for his lifetime achievement in the dramatic arts

== 2008 ==
Recipient	Occupation	Rationale
Janez Gradišnik	writer and translator	for his lifetime achievement in literature and translation
Miljenko Licul	graphic designer	for his extensive opus in graphic design

== 2009 ==
Recipient	Occupation	Rationale
Štefka Drolc	actress	for her lifetime achievement
Zmago Jeraj	artist	for his lifetime achievement

== 2010 ==
Recipient	Occupation	Rationale
Kostja Gatnik	artist and illustrator	for his lifetime achievement in fine arts
Mateja Rebolj	dancer	for her lifetime achievement in the field of dance

== 2011 ==
Recipient	Occupation	Rationale
Miroslav Košuta	poet, playwright and translator	for his poetic opus
Anton Nanut	conductor	for his entire creative opus

== 2012 ==
Recipient	Occupation	Rationale
Jože Snoj	poet, writer, essayist	for his lifetime achievement and rich literary opus
Matjaž Vipotnik	graphic designer	for his lifetime achievement in graphic design

== 2013 ==
Recipient	Occupation	Rationale
Zorko Simčič	writer	for his lifetime achievement and rich literary opus
Marlenka Stupica	illustrator	for her lifetime achievement in illustration

== 2014 ==
Recipient	Occupation	Rationale
Vladimir Kavčič	writer	for his lifetime achievement and rich literary opus
Pavle Merkù	composer	for his lifetime achievement and rich creative opus

== 2015 ==
Recipient	Occupation	Rationale
Andrej Brvar	poet	for his lifetime achievement
Miki Muster	academic sculptor	for his lifetime achievement

== 2016 ==
Recipient	Occupation	Rationale
Tone Partljič	writer and playwright	for his lifetime achievement
Ivo Petrić	composer	for his lifetime achievement
