= Heritage (1984 film) =

1984 film

Heritage (Slovene: Dediščina)
- Directed by: Matjaž Klopčič
- Written by: Matjaž Klopčič
- Starring: Ivo Ban
- Cinematography: Tomislav Pinter
- Edited by: Darinka Peršin
- Release date: 5 November 1984
- Running time: 109 minutes
- Country: Yugoslavia
- Language: Slovene

Heritage (Slovene: Dediščina) is a 1984 Yugoslavian drama film directed by Matjaž Klopčič. It was screened in the Un Certain Regard section at the 1985 Cannes Film Festival.

== Cast ==
- Ivo Ban - Viktor
- Polde Bibič
- Bine Matoh
- Bernarda Oman
- Boris Ostan
- Radko Polič
- Majda Potokar - Mila
- Milena Zupančič
