= Ivanka Mežan =

Slovenian actress (born 1926)

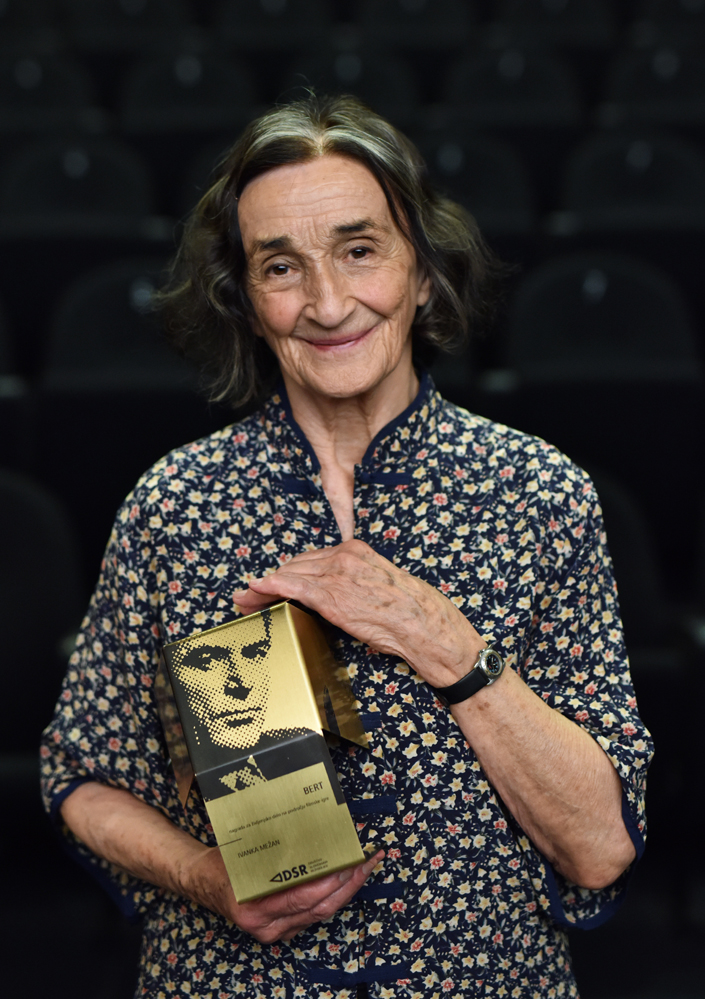
- Mežan in 2015
- Born: 18 June 1926 (age 100); Maribor, Slovenia, Yugoslavia
- Education: Academy of Theatre, Radio, Film and Television
- Occupation: Actress
- Years active: 1945–present
- Awards: Prešeren Award

Ivanka Mežan (born 18 June 1926) is a Slovenian actress, known for her performance in films and theaters.

== Life and career ==
Ivanka was born in June 1926 in Maribor, the daughter of Janez Mežan, a painter. She performed on the stage for the first time at the Slovenian National Theatre in the liberated territory of Črnomelj in 1944 and then enrolled at the Academy of Acting Arts in Ljubljana. Between 1945 and 1979 she was a regular member of the Ljubljana Drama and after her retirement she regularly performed in other Slovenian theaters.

She first established herself with the roles of young women in Slovenian and foreign classical and contemporary dramas. On stage she appeared in numerous shows like The Tragedy of Macbeth, Othello, Hamlet, etc.

She was married to Miloš Marinček, a builder and professor at FGG. He died in 2005. Mezan is the receipt of Prešeren Award, Sterija's Awards and others for her contribution in Slovene cinematography.

In 2019 she was bestowed the title of Honorary citizen of Ljubljana.

== Filmography ==
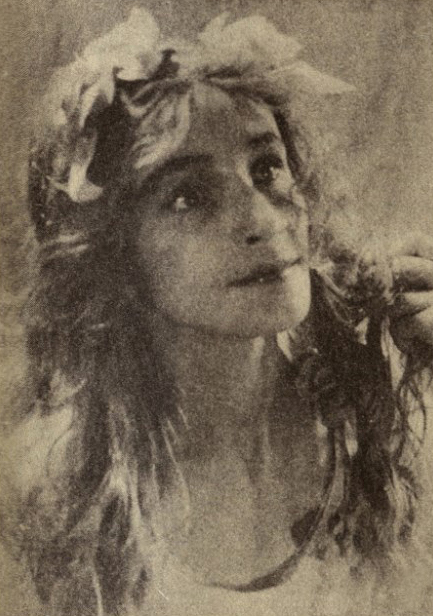
Mezan in the role of Ophelia in 1948.

- Cvetje v jeseni (1973)
- Let mrtve ptice (1973)
- Čudoviti prah (1975)
- See You in the Next War (1980)
- Deseti brat (1982)
- Pustota (1982)
- Veselo gostivanje (1984)
- Živela svoboda (1987)
- Coprnica Zofka (1989)
- Decembrski dež (1990)
- Bronasti vijak (1988)
- Ljubljana je ljubljena (2005)
- Moj sin, seksualni manijak (2006)
- Instalacija ljubezni (2007)
- Ko naju več ne bo (2005)
- Vsakdan ni vsak dan (2008)
- 9:06 (2009)
- Deklica in drevo (2012)
- Panika (2013)
- Pojdi z mano (2016)
- Vztrajanje (2016)
