= Miha Baloh =

Slovene actor (1928–2022)

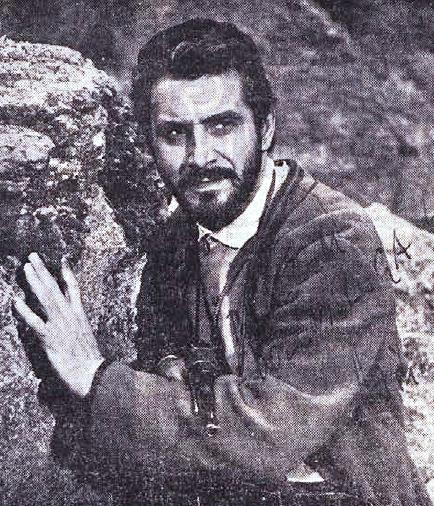
- Born: 21 May 1928; Jesenice, Kingdom of Serbs, Croats and Slovenes
- Died: 6 December 2022 (aged 94)
- Occupation: Actor

Miha Baloh (21 May 1928 – 6 December 2022) was a Slovene actor. He started participating in local theatre productions after the Second World War and eventually enrolled in the AGRFT in Ljubljana, from where he graduated in 1952. In 1953, he began collaboration with the Permanent Slovene Theatre in Trieste. There he worked with the director Jože Babič who also offered him his first major film role. From 1967, he also worked on international productions on projects such as the Austrian TV comedy series Leni, German films on Winnetou and a French-German series on Omer Pasha. He continued to work in the theatre throughout his career.

Baloh died on 6 December 2022, at the age of 94.

== Filmography ==
Year	Title	Role	Notes
1952	Svet na Kajžarju	Fant s kapo	
1957	Ne čakaj na maj	Student	
1960	Veselica	Kurir	
1960	Signal Over the City	Robert Markic 'Spanjolac'	
1961	Ples v dežju	Peter	
1961	And Love Has Vanished	Mirko Pavlovic	
1962	Warriors Five	Sansone	
1962	Sjenka slave	Java	
1962	Rana jesen	Sasa	
1963	Thundering Mountains	Vojvoda Mico Ljubibratic	
1963	Operacija Ticijan	Dane	
1964	Svanuće	Lozac Miha	
1964	Among Vultures	'Reverend' Weller	
1965	Provereno nema mina	Marko	
1965	The Desperado Trail	Gomez	
1965	Po isti poti se ne vračaj	Ahmet	
1966	Amandus	Luka	
1966	Winnetou and the Crossbreed	Judge	
1966	Winnetou and Old Firehand	Capt. Luis Sanchez Quilvera	
1967	Grajski biki	Tarzan	
1967	Nevidni bataljon	Crnolasec	
1968	Goli čovik	Kapetan broda	
1969	Dead Body on Broadway	Joe Costello	
1969	Battle of Neretva	Ustasha Commander	
1971	Maškarada	Gantar - Husband	
1972	Lov na jelene	Nacelnik milicije	
1972	Ko pride lev	Komandir odreda	
1972	Ko pride lev	Oce	
1973	The Bloody Vultures of Alaska	Buffins	
1975	Crvena zemlja	professor Bojan Dolinar	
1978	Tamo i natrag		
1979	Draga moja Iza	partizan Tomaz	
1982	13. jul	Partizan	
1985	Naš človek	Vodja igralskega studija	
1991	Čaruga	Sudac	(final film role)
