= Duša Počkaj =

Slovenian actress (1924–1982)

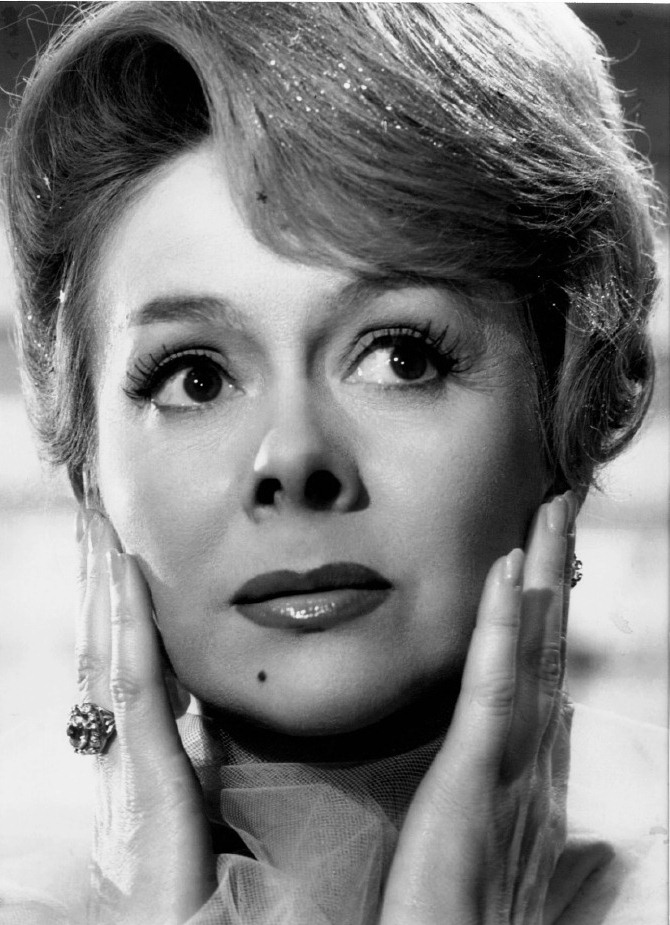
- Duša Počkaj in 1964
- Born: 16 November 1924; Dolnja Lendava, Kingdom of Serbs, Croats and Slovenes
- Died: 24 June 1982 (aged 57); Ljubljana, SR Slovenia, SFR Yugoslavia
- Occupation: Actress
- Years active: 1946–1982

Duša Počkaj (16 November 1924 – 24 June 1982) was a Slovenian film and theatre actress.

Following World War II Počkaj studied at the Ljubljana Academy of Theatre, Radio, Film and Television, and from 1946 until her death in 1982 she was member of the Ljubljana National Drama Theatre ensemble.

She started acting in films in the early 1950s and her biggest success was the starring role in the 1961 film Dancing in the Rain (Ples v dežju) directed by Boštjan Hladnik, for which she won the Golden Arena for Best Actress awards. She won the Prešeren Award in 1965.
