= Dušica Žegarac =

Serbian actress (1944–2019)

- Born: 15 April 1944; Belgrade, German-occupied Serbia
- Died: 24 May 2019 (aged 75)
- Occupation: Actress
- Years active: 1960–2012
- Spouse: Pedro Francisco de Pina Massano de Amorim (m. 1970; div. 1975)
- Children: 2

Dušica Žegarac (Serbian Cyrillic: Душица Жегарац; 15 April 1944 – 24 May 2019) was a Serbian film and television actress. She began acting in 1960 and her first appearance was in France Štiglic's film The Ninth Circle (Deveti krug), for which she won the Golden Arena for Best Actress at the Pula Film Festival, the Yugoslav national film awards.

She won her second Golden Arena for starring in Zdravko Randić's 1971 film Opklada.

In 2014, Žegarac's memoir Kao na filmu was released.
