= Early Autumn (disambiguation) =

Early Autumn may refer to:

- Early Autumn, a 1926 novel by Louis Bromfield
- Early Autumn, painting by Qian Xuan (1235–1305) now in the Detroit Institute of Arts
- Early Autumn (Parker novel), a 1980 Spenser detective novel by Robert B. Parker
- "Early Autumn" (song), a 1949 song composed by Ralph Burns and Woody Herman with lyrics by Johnny Mercer
- "Early Autumn," a song composed by Barbara Belle and Stan Rhodes, recorded by Fran Warren (with Claude Thornhill)
- Early Autumn (film), a 1962 Yugoslav film
