= Amandus (film) =

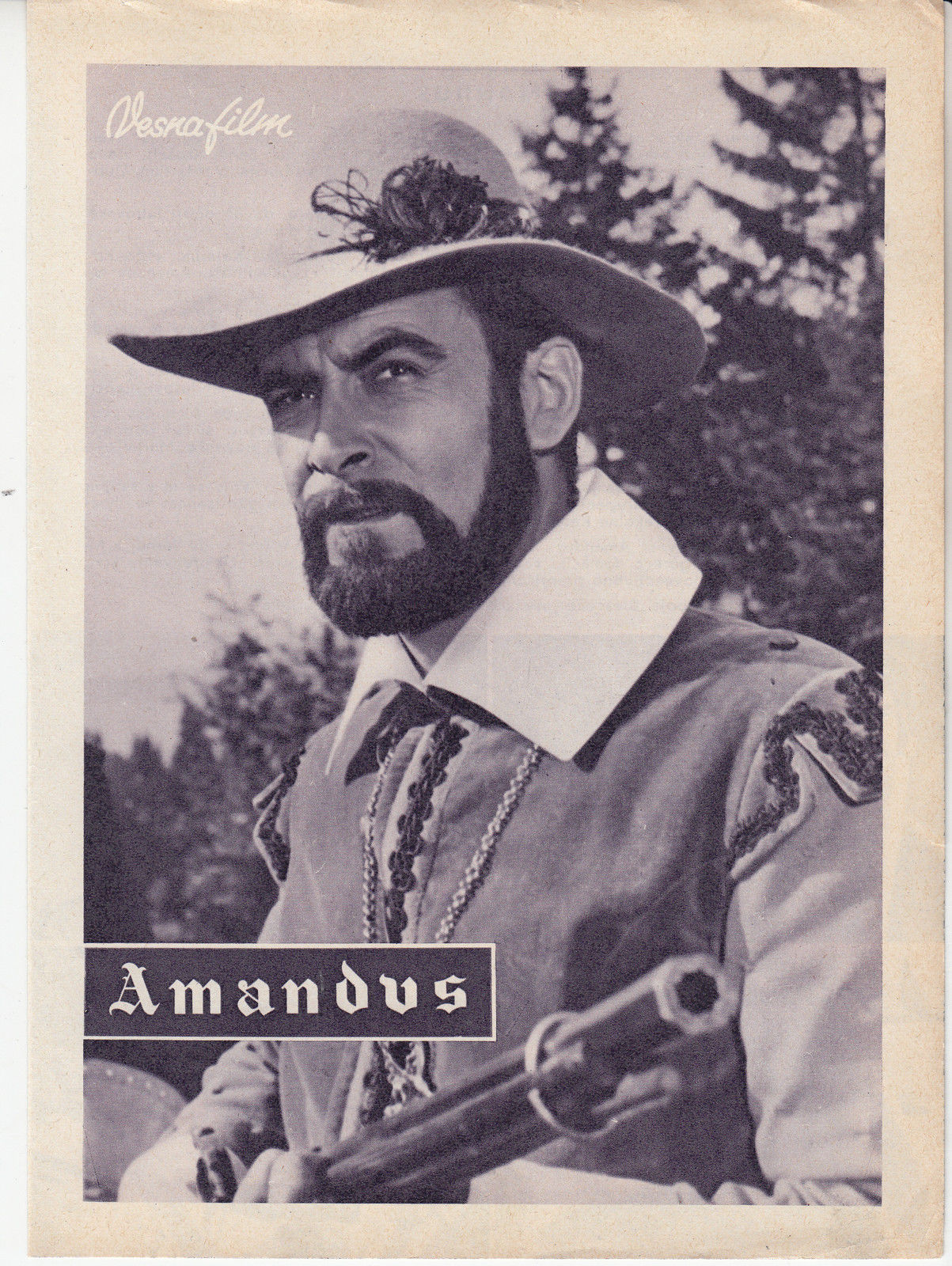
- Directed by: France Štiglic
- Written by: Andrej Hieng
- Starring: Kristijan Muck; Boris Kralj; Miha Baloh; Sandi Krošl; Anka Zupanc
- Music by: Alojz Srebotnjak
- Release date: 28 February 1966
- Running time: 88 minutes
- Country: Yugoslavia
- Language: Slovene

Amandus is a 1966 Slovene film directed by France Štiglic. It is based on a novel by Ivan Tavčar and was adapted for the screen by Andrej Hieng. It is set at the end of the 17th century in the area that is now Slovenia at a time of religious intolerance with Amandus, a Catholic priest, determined to persecute local Protestants.
