= The Parvenus =

- Directed by: Bojan Stupica
- Written by: Janko Kersnik (novel); Bojan Stupica
- Cinematography: Ivan Marincek; Zarko Tusar
- Edited by: Vojislav Bjenjas
- Music by: Bojan Adamic
- Production company: Triglav Film
- Distributed by: Viba Film
- Release date: 18 May 1953
- Running time: 135 minutes
- Country: Yugoslavia
- Language: Slovene

The Parvenus (Slovene: Jara gospoda) is a 1953 Yugoslav historical drama film directed by Bojan Stupica and starring Vladimir Skrbinsek, Elvira Kralj and Ljudevit Pristavec. It is based on a novel by Janko Kersnik portraying life amongst the Slovenian elite of Trieste, then part of the Austro-Hungarian Empire, during the 1890s.

== Partial cast ==
- Vladimir Skrbinsek as Tine pl. Mali
- Elvira Kralj as Tercijalka
- Ljudevit Pristavec as Sodni pisar
- Ciril Medved as Sitna kmetica
- Janez Cesar as Pravdarski kmet
- Metka Bucar as Postarna gospodicna
- Masa Slavec as Postarana gospodicna
- Drago Zupan as Pl. Orel
- Ivan Mrak as Pianist
- Luce Florentini as Pepe - Zozef
- Lojze Drenovec as Penzionist
- Stane Sever as Pavle
- Stane Potokar as Mozakar
- Marija Nablocka as Madam Lili
- Mila Kacic as Kuharica
- Josip Danes as Komodni Dunajcan
- France Kosmac as Komi z zobotrebcem
- Tina Leon as Julija
- Ante Gnidovec as Gostilnicar
- Nezka Gorjup as Gospa z deznikom
- Lili Novy as Dunajcanka
- Dusa Pockaj as Blondinka
- Helmut Turzansky as Baron Herbert
- Zvone Sintic as Avskultant
- Bojan Stupica as dr. Andrej Vrbanoj
- Mira Stupica as Ancka

== Bibliography ==
- Steve Fallon. Slovenia. Lonely Planet, 2010.
