= Red Wheat =

1970 film

- Directed by: Živojin Pavlović
- Written by: Živojin Pavlović; Ivan Potrc
- Starring: Rade Šerbedžija
- Cinematography: Milorad Jaksic-Fandjo
- Edited by: Olga Skrigin
- Release date: 28 December 1970
- Running time: 85 minutes
- Country: Yugoslavia
- Language: Serbo-Croatian

Red Wheat (Slovene: Rdeče klasje) is a 1970 Yugoslavian drama film directed by Živojin Pavlović. It was entered into the 21st Berlin International Film Festival.

== Cast ==
- Boris Bruncko – (as Boris Brunčko)
- Olga Ftitc – (as Olga Fritz)
- Irena Glonar – Tunika
- Majda Grbac – Hana
- Angelca Hlebce – Aktivistka Liza
- Roman Lovric – (as Roman Lavrač)
- Milena Muhic – (as Milena Muhič)
- Stane Potisk – (as Stanko Potisk)
- Majda Potokar – Zefa
- Janez Rohacek – (as Janez Rohaček)
- Rade Šerbedžija
- Alja Tkaceva – (as Alja Tkačev)
- Franjo Vicar – (as Franjo Vičar)
