= Robar =

Robar may refer to:

- Filip Robar Dorin (born 1940), Slovene film director, screenwriter, and film editor
- Mitja Robar (born 1983), Slovene ice hockey player
- Robar RC-50, American counter-sniper rifle
