= Milena Zupančič =

Slovenian actress (1946–2026)

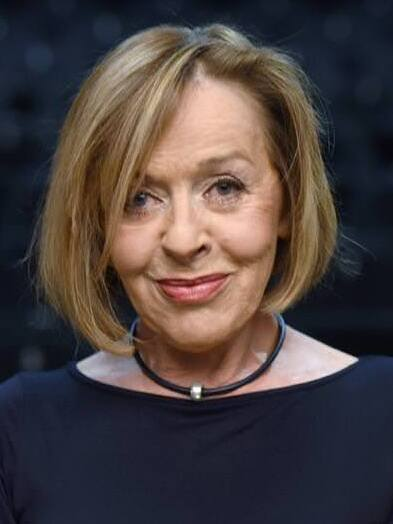
- Born: 18 December 1946; Jesenice, PR Slovenia, FPR Yugoslavia (present-day Slovenia)
- Died: 15 August 2026 (aged 79); Slovenia
- Occupation: Actress
- Years active: 1970–2026
- Spouse: Dušan Jovanović

Milena Zupančič (18 December 1946 – 15 August 2026) was a Slovenian actress.

== Life and career ==
Raised by a single mother, Zupančič finished high school in her hometown of Jesenice. Her first major appearances were two roles in films by Matjaž Klopčič, in Blossoms in Autumn (Cvetje v jeseni; 1973) and The Widowhood of Karolina Žašler (1976).

Zupančič went on to star in a number of important film and television productions over the next four decades, winning two Golden Arena for Best Actress awards (in 1976 and 1977) and the Prešeren Award for Lifetime Achievement (1993). She is also known for starring in many theatre productions staged by the Ljubljana National Drama Theatre.

From 2000 to 2011 she was UNICEF regional ambassador for the Western Balkans. Zupančič was married to theatre director Dušan Jovanović, and was previously married to actor Radko Polič.

Zupančič died on 15 August 2026, at the age of 79.

== Selected filmography ==
- Blossoms in Autumn (1973)
- The Widowhood of Karolina Zasler (Vdovstvo Karoline Žašler, 1976)
- Idealist (1976)
- Journalist (Novinar, 1979)
- Maya and the Starboy (1988)
