= Don't Cry, Peter =

Ne joči, Peter
- Directed by: France Štiglic
- Written by: Andrej Hieng; Vladimir Koch; Ivan Ribič; France Štiglic
- Starring: Lojze Rozman; Bert Sotlar; Zlatko Šugman; Majda Potokar; Polde Bibič
- Cinematography: Ivan Marinček
- Edited by: Milka Badjura
- Music by: Alojz Srebotnjak
- Production companies: Viba Film, Ljubljana
- Release date: 17 July 1964
- Running time: 92 minutes
- Country: Yugoslavia
- Language: Slovene

Don't Cry, Peter (Slovene: Ne joči, Peter), also known as Nicht Weinen Peter, is a 1964 Slovene comedy war adventure film directed by France Štiglic. Released on 17 July 1964, the film was entered in the Third International Film Festival of India (1965) in Delhi, India. The cast included Lojze Rozman, Bert Sotlar, Zlatko Šugman, Majda Potokar, Polde Bibič and Bogdan Lubej as the titular Peter.

The story, set during WW II, is about three Partisans entrusted the job of safely taking three children to a liberated area, meeting German soldiers on the way.

== Plot ==
Dane and Lovro are two mine workers now turned soldiers, in the 2nd Sappers Company of a Partisan Brigade. They bemoan their lack of aggressive war combat as compared to the 1st Sappers. Finally, they are sent on an important mission. Their excitement turns to embarrassment when they realise that their job is to accompany three children and transport them safely to the liberated area. They are joined by a new recruit Dolfe. A bond develops between the soldiers and the children, especially with the youngest, four-year-old Peter whose curiosity causes many tense and dangerous situations, thus requiring a constant attention by Dane and Lovro. During their travel Peter unintentionally falls into a small cave which leads to a huge stockpile of German explosives and ammunition which is then blown up, causing massive material loss to the Germans.

== Cast ==
- Lojze Rozman as Dane
- Bert Sotlar as Lovro
- Majda Potokar as Magda
- Zlatko Šugman as Dolfe
- Bogdan Lubej as Peter
- Andrej Kurent as Commander
- Polde Bibič as Matija
- Maks Bajc as Soldier
- Karel Pogorelec as Innkeeper
- Danilo Bezlaj as German soldier
- Franci Prus as German soldier
- Vinko Podgoršek as German soldier
