= Gravehopping =

Gravehopping (Slovene: Odgrobadogroba) is a 2005 Slovenian film directed by Jan Cvitkovič. It was Slovenia's submission to the 79th Academy Awards for the Academy Award for Best Foreign Language Film, but was not accepted as a nominee.

== See also ==
- List of submissions to the 79th Academy Awards for Best Foreign Language Film
