= Real Pests =

- Directed by: Jože Bevc
- Written by: Jože Bevc
- Starring: Bert Sotlar; Dare Valič; Majda Potokar; Jože Horvat; Milada Kalezič; Boris Cavazza; Radko Polič; Andrej Prevc; Bogdan Sajovic
- Cinematography: Ivan Marinček
- Edited by: Darinka Peršin
- Music by: Janez Gregorc
- Distributed by: Viba film
- Release date: 1977
- Running time: 96 minutes
- Country: Yugoslavia
- Language: Slovene

Real Pests (Slovene: To so gadi) is a 1977 Slovenian comedy film by the writer and director Jože Bevc, starring Bert Sotlar, Dare Valič and Majda Potokar. The film was one of the most successful films in Slovenia, holding the domestic box office record for almost 15 years.

== Plot ==
Real Pests is a light-hearted comedy about a widower Štebe (Bert Sotlar), who works as a bus driver and lives with his five adolescent sons and an elderly maid Rozi (Majda Potokar) in Ljubljana. The boys are wild, constantly playing pranks on neighbors and Rozi, who is fed up with their behavior which earned them the nickname "gadi" ("pests", or literally "vipers"). One day, she fulfills her threat and leaves for home in the countryside despite being extremely fond of the family. Right then, Rozi's young niece Meri (Milada Kalezič) comes to town and is offered a place to stay by Štebe until she can find a job. The attractive Meri cannot compete with Rozi at housekeeping, but she immediately wraps all the boys around her finger, also getting attention from Štebe's coworker Toni (Boris Cavazza) with whom she later becomes a couple. However, nobody seems to know where she is going every afternoon. Finally, Štebe, who knows Rozi very well, convinces her to come back. At the same time, the mystery about Meri is also solved: she had been learning to drive a bus and has just passed the driving test, becoming a driver at the city transport company. Everybody boards her bus and they drive off.

== Cast ==
- Bert Sotlar - father Štebe
- Dare Valič - Bine
- Majda Potokar - Rozi
- Jože Horvat - Brane
- Milada Kalezič - Meri
- Boris Cavazza - Toni
- Radko Polič - Boris
- Andrej Prevc - Janez
- Bogdan Sajovic - Muki
- Maks Bajc - Merklin
