= Ljerka Belak =

Slovene actress (1948–2021)

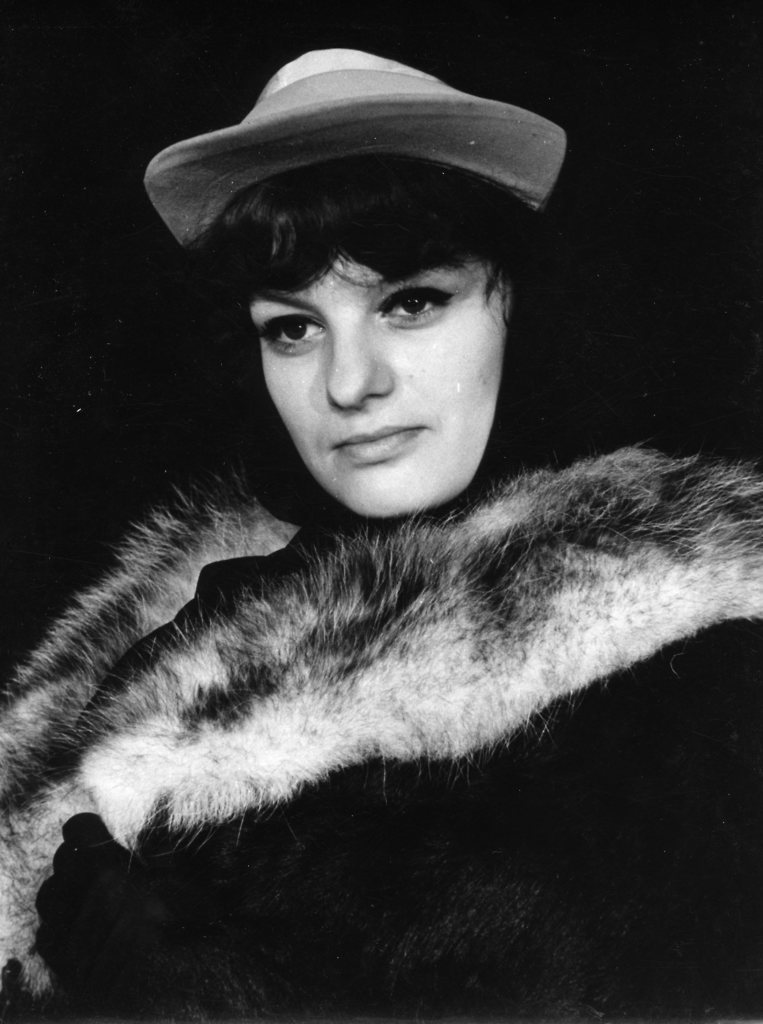
- Born: February 13, 1948; Ljubljana, Yugoslavia
- Died: April 21, 2021 (aged 73)
- Occupation(s): Actor, radio personality

Ljerka Belak (13 February 1948 – 21 April 2021) was a Slovenian actress. She won a Prešeren Award in 1989.
