= Janez Albreht =

Slovenian actor

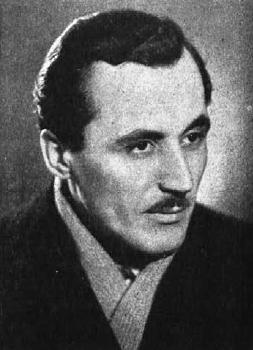
Janez Albreht

Janez Albreht (23 March 1925, in Ljubljana – 1 March 2013) was a Slovenian theatre actor. He was a member of SNG in Ljubljana. He worked on the radio and TV Slovenia and took main roles in the dramas of William Shakespeare and Anton Pavlovich Chekhov. He received the Prešeren Fund Award in 1981.

== Selected filmography ==
- Idealist (1976)
