= A Summer in a Sea Shell =

- Film poster
- Directed by: Tugo Štiglic
- Starring: David Sluga; Kaja Štiglic
- Release date: 19 March 1985
- Running time: 95 min
- Country: Yugoslavia
- Language: Slovenian

A Summer in a Sea Shell (Slovene: Poletje v školjki) is a 1985 Slovenian teen film directed by Tugo Štiglic. It was followed by A Summer in a Sea Shell 2 (Slovene: Poletje v školjki 2) in 1988.

== Plot ==
=== A Summer in a Sea Shell ===
Tomaz spends his last summer before he becomes a teenager playing by the sea and fighting rival groups of children from nearby towns. The children get along once they discover that someone is stealing shellfish from a local fisherman, who is also their friend. They come together to try to find the person responsible by using Tomaz's supercomputer named Vedi. When they succeed in catching the thief, the fisherman gives Tomaz a seashell as thanks for his help. Tomaz also finds his first love Milena during that summer.

=== A Summer in a Sea Shell 2 ===
Three years after the events of the first film, Tomaz and Milena meet again in Ljubljana. Tomaz joins the same dance club as Milena, but the club is scheduled for closure and in order to save it, the members of the dance club try to stop it from closing by performing a dance show.

== Cast ==
- David Sluga (Tomaž)
- Kaja Štiglic (Milena)
- Dare Valič (Tomažev oče)
- Boris Kralj (Luka)
- Majda Potokar (zdravnica)
- Jure Sotlar (Filip)
- Marjana Karner (Tomaževa mama)

== Production ==
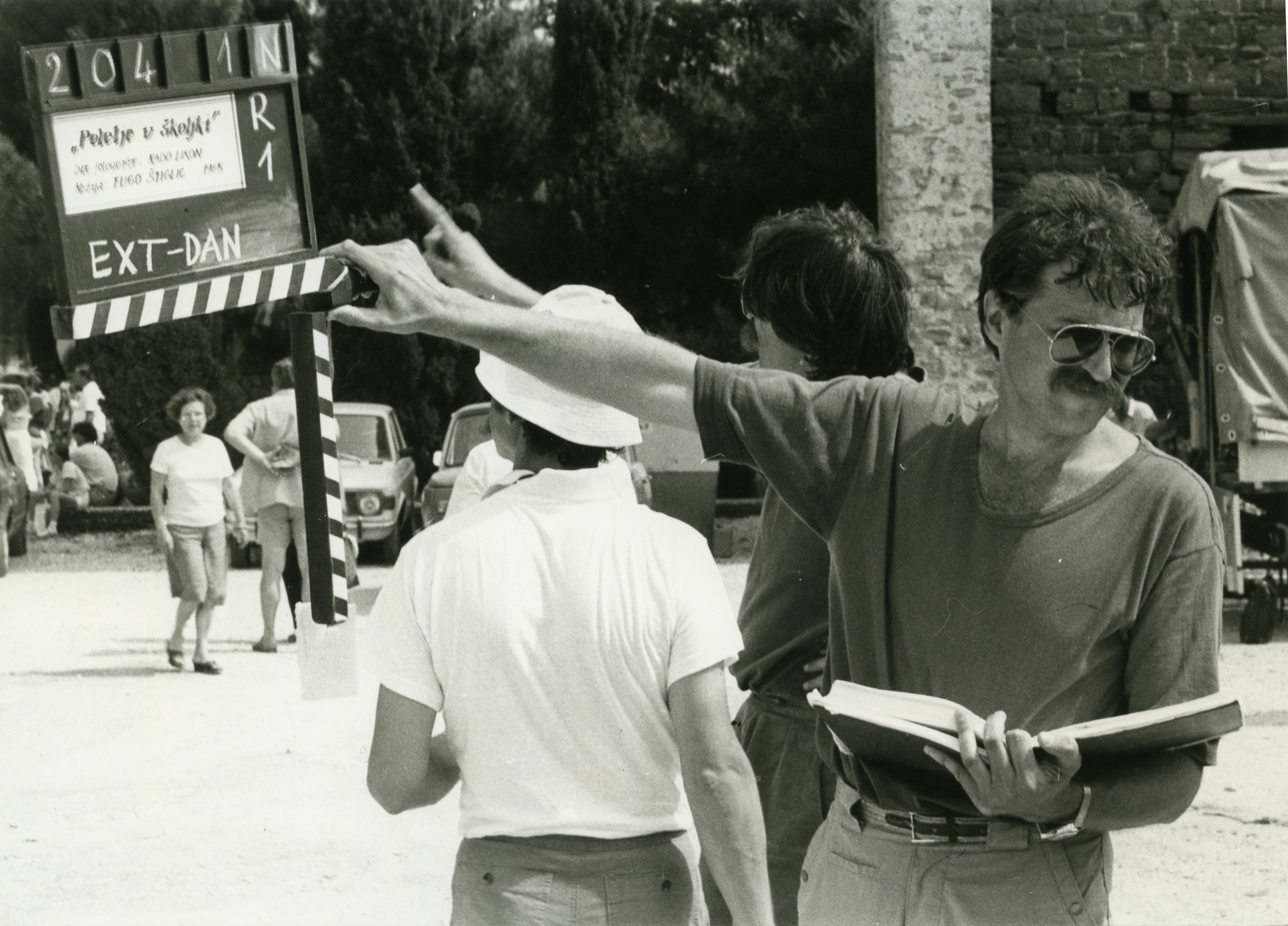

Štiglic came up with the idea for the films by thinking of his daughter Kaja Štiglic, who also starred in the films, because she liked to dance. The music in the first film, including the song Prisluhni školjki (A Song In a Seashell), was written by Jani Golob and performed by the keyboard player Miha Kralj. David Sluga, who played the role of Tomaz, was chosen to audition for the film because of his dancing. Sluga originally had no interest in auditioning for the film until he realized that it was a starring role, and after the film's premiere, he originally felt that fame was a burden. The cast and film crew did not stay in touch with each other after the second film's production.

The film was the first Slovenian coming-of-age film to feature popular music and dancing.

== Reception ==
The first film won the Grand Prix award at the Giffoni Film Festival, a film festival in Saint-Malo, and a film festival in Szeged. An article published on the online version of the Slovenian newspaper Dnevnik states that when someone asks Slovenians what their favorite film is, A Summer in a Sea Shell might be among them. Večer wrote that the film was one of the best youth romances of the 1980s.

Due to the first film's success, a sequel titled A Summer in a Sea Shell 2 was released in 1988. The sequel takes place in Ljubljana and continues the story of the couple in the first film.
