= Andrej Hieng =

Slovene writer, playwright and theatre director

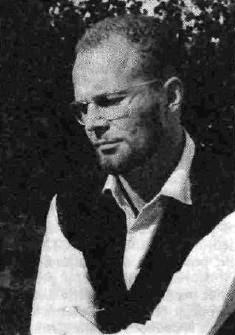
- Born: 17 February 1925; Ljubljana, Kingdom of Serbs, Croats and Slovenes, now in Slovenia
- Died: 17 January 2000 (aged 74); Ljubljana, Slovenia
- Occupations: Writer, playwright, theatre director
- Writing career
- Notable works: Čarodej, Obnebje metuljev, Čudežni feliks
- Notable awards: Prešeren Award; 1988 for his prose and drama works Kresnik Award; 1994 Čudežni Feliks

Andrej Hieng (17 February 1925 – 17 January 2000) was a Slovene writer, playwright and theatre director.

Hieng was born in Ljubljana in 1925. He studied at the Academy of Performing Arts in Ljubljana between 1948 and 1952 and worked as a theatre director in Kranj, Celje and Ljubljana. As well as his plays, he is also known for his novels and short stories.

He received a number of awards including the Prešeren Foundation Award in 1967 for his novel Gozd in pečina, the Grand Prešeren Award in 1988 for his literary and dramatic opus and the Kresnik Award for his novel Čudežni feliks in 1994. In 1995 he was made a member of the Slovenian Academy of Sciences and Arts. He died in Ljubljana in 2000.

== List of works ==
- Novele, short stories, (1954)
- Usodni rob, short stories, (1957)
- Planota, short stories, (1961)
- Gozd in pečina, novel, (1966)
- Orfeum, novel, (1972)
- Čarodej, novel, (1976)
- Obnebje metuljev, novel, (1980)
- Čudežni feliks, novel, (1993)

== Plays ==
- Cortesova vrnitev, drama (1969)
- Burleska o Grku, drama (1969)
- Gluhi mož na meji, drama (1969)
- Osvajalec, drama (1971)
- Lažna Ivana, comedy (1973)
- Izgubljeni sin, comedy (1976)
- Večer ženinov, drama (1979)
- Krvava ptica, comedy (1980)
- Nori malar, comedy (1980)
- Dež v Piranu, drama (1982)
- Zakladi gospe Berte, drama (1983)
- Mark in Antonij, drama (1983)
