= Majda Potokar =

Slovenian actress (1930–2001)

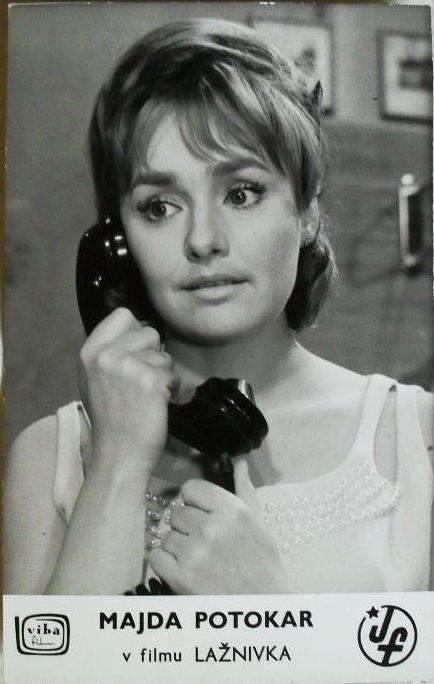
- Majda Potokar on a 1965 card
- Born: 1 March 1930; Ljubljana, Yugoslavia
- Died: 25 April 2001 (aged 71); Ljubljana, Slovenia
- Occupation: Actress
- Years active: 1948–1991

Majda Potokar (1 March 1930 – 25 April 2001) was a Slovenian film and theatre actress.

Daughter of actor Lojze Potokar, she graduated in 1952 from the Ljubljana Theatre, Radio, Film and Television Academy. Before graduation she appeared in her first role in the 1948 film On Our Own Land, the first ever Slovenian feature film directed by France Štiglic.

Potokar was member of the Ljubljana National Drama Theatre ensemble during her entire career from late 1952 to 1990.

== Selected filmography ==
- On Our Own Land (Na svoji zemlji; 1948, dir. by France Štiglic)
- Wild Growth (Samorastniki; 1963, dir. by Igor Pretnar)
- Don't Cry, Peter (Ne joči, Peter, 1964 dir. by France Štiglic)
- Red Wheat (Rdeče klasje, 1970 dir. by Živojin Pavlović)
- A Summer in a Sea Shell (Poletje v školjki, 1985 dir. by Tugo Štiglic)
