= Kostja Gatnik =

Slovene artist (1945–2022)

- Born: 11 September 1945; Ljubljana, FS Slovenia, DF Yugoslavia
- Died: 1 August 2022 (aged 76)
- Education: Academy of Fine Arts, Ljubljana
- Known for: Painting, drawing, illustrating, design
- Notable work: Children's books illustrations, comic books
- Awards: Prešeren Award; 2010 for lifetime achievement Levstik Award; 2011 for lifetime achievement

Kostja Gatnik (11 September 1945 – 1 August 2022) was a Slovene artist, graphic designer and illustrator, best known for his illustrations in children's books.

== Biography ==
Gatnik was born in Ljubljana in 1945. He studied at the Academy of Fine Arts in Ljubljana. He worked as a painter, graphic designer, illustrator and photographer. He illustrated over 60 books, published cartoons and designed puppets and theatre costumes. Among all characters he created perhaps the most famous is Magna Purga, a comic book hero.

In 2010, he won the Grand Prešeren Award for his lifetime achievements in the fine arts. In 2011, he won the Levstik Award for lifetime achievement in illustration.
