= Ferdo Delak =

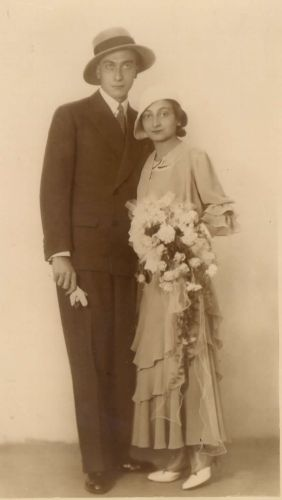
- Ferdo Delak with his wife
- Born: June 29, 1905
- Died: January 16, 1968 (aged 62)

Ferdo Delak (June 29, 1905 – January 16, 1968) was a Slovene theater and film director and journalist.

Delak was born in Gorizia on June 29, 1905. He studied at the University of Ljubljana's Faculty of Arts, and then later in Vienna, Berlin, Prague, and Paris. He graduated from the Mozarteum University of Salzburg in 1935.

Delak was one of the first Slovenian avant-garde figures and theater revolutionaries. He founded the New Stage (Slovene: Novi oder) movement in Ljubljana and the international avant-garde journal Tank. He was involved in almost all Slovene and Yugoslav theaters and also served twice as the director of the Croatian National Theater. He was also involved in work at other Croatian theaters. He was also engaged for a short time at the Ljubljana National Drama Theater and the Slovenian National Opera and Ballet Theater. In 1932, Delak directed the second Slovene full-length film, Triglavske strmine (The Slopes of Mount Triglav, 1932), which was his only film.

Delak died in Ljubljana on January 16, 1968. He was a cousin of TIGR member Danilo Zelen.
