= Elvira Kralj =

Slovenian actress

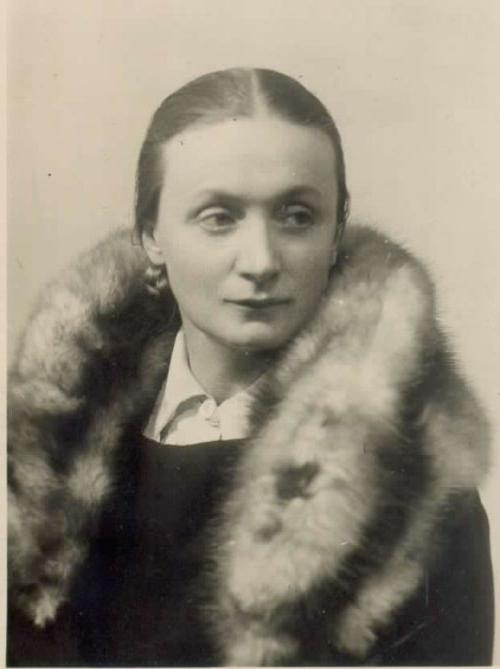
Elvira Kralj in the 1930s

Elvira Kralj (born 16 August 1900 in Trieste; died 6 September 1978) was a Slovenian actress who has been featured on a stamp. She also became a Prešeren laureate in 1969.
