= Majda Grbac =

Slovenian actress (born 1946)

- Born: 27 May 1946 (age 79); Maribor, Yugoslavia (present-day Slovenia)
- Occupation: Actress
- Years active: 1970–present

Majda Grbac (born 27 May 1946) is a Slovenian actress.

She won the Golden Arena Award for Best Leading Actress award in 1974 for her role in Let mrtve ptice (English: The Flight of the Dead Bird).
