= Let's Go Our Own Way =

- Directed by: Miha Hočevar
- Written by: Miha Hočevar; Matevž Lužar
- Produced by: Danijel Hočevar
- Starring: Jurij Zrnec; Tadej Koren Šmid; Jure Kreft; Matevz Štular; Jana Zupančič
- Music by: Mitja Vrhovnik Smrekar
- Distributed by: Vertigo/Emotionfilm; RTV Slovenija; E-Film
- Release dates: 2 October 2010 (Slovenian Film Festival); 4 November 2010 (Slovenia)
- Running time: 92 minutes
- Country: Slovenia
- Language: Slovene
- Budget: € 654,000

Let's Go Our Own Way (Slovene: Gremo mi po svoje) is a 2010 Slovenian adventures youth film directed by Miha Hočevar, starring Jurij Zrnec, Tadej Koren Šmid, and Jure Kreft in the title roles.

This film reached the biggest audience in premiere weekend in Slovenian cinema history. The film gathered record 18,686 visitors.

== Plot ==
Film is talking about scouts who spend their free time in nature. Aleks is camping near Soča river together with his friends. Starešina, the scouting leader is taking everything too serious and that cause a lot of problems. And boys are a lot more interested in girls than camp. The movie was filmed in ideal Triglav National Park in Slovenia.

== Cast ==
- Jurij Zrnec (Starešina / Taborovodja)
- Tadej Koren Šmid (Aleks)
- Jure Kreft (Zaspanec)
- Matevz Štular (Jaka)
- Jana Zupančič (Kuharica Majda)
- Luka Cimprič (Vodnik Grega)
- Uroš Kaurin (Vodnik Peter)
