= The Widowhood of Karolina Žašler =

1976 film

- Directed by: Matjaž Klopčič
- Written by: Matjaž Klopčič; Tone Partljic
- Starring: Polde Bibic
- Cinematography: Tomislav Pinter
- Edited by: Darinka Peršin
- Release date: 16 November 1976
- Running time: 109 minutes
- Country: Yugoslavia
- Language: Slovene

The Widowhood of Karolina Žašler (Slovene: Vdovstvo Karoline Žašler) is a 1976 Yugoslav comedy film directed by Matjaž Klopčič. It was entered into the 27th Berlin International Film Festival.

== Cast ==
- Marija Bačko
- Polde Bibič - Žašler
- Miranda Caharija - Korl's wife
- Boris Cavazza - Tenor
- Maks Furijan - Lilek
- Marjeta Gregorač - Anica
- Marijan Hinteregger - Fonza
- Milena Muhič - Filomena
- Marko Okorn - Lojz
- Anton Petje - Korl
- Radko Polič - Accordion player
- Zlatko Šugman - Prunk
- Dare Ulaga - Gabrijel
- Dare Valič - Driver
- Milena Zupančič - Karolina Žašler
