= Life in Kajzar =

- Slovene: Svet na kajžarju
- Directed by: France Štiglic
- Starring: Vika Podgorska; Miro Kopač; Tatjana Šenk; Bert Sotlar; Vladimir Skrbinšek; Ivo Zoretič; Lojze Potokar; Frane Milčinski - Ježek
- Cinematography: Ivan Marinček
- Music by: Ciril Cvetko
- Release date: 27 December 1952
- Running time: 100 minutes
- Country: Yugoslavia
- Language: Slovene

Life in Kajzar (Slovene: Svet na kajžarju) is a 1952 Slovene film directed by France Štiglic. It is based on a novel by Ivan Potrč and is set in Haloze in the Slovene countryside in the years immediately after the Second World War.
