= Morana (film) =

1994 film

- Directed by: Aleš Verbič
- Written by: Samo Kuscer
- Produced by: Jure Kosak
- Starring: Tanja Dimitrievska
- Cinematography: Valentin Perko
- Edited by: Stanko Kostanjevec
- Music by: Slavko Avsenik
- Production companies: Studio 37; Ljubljana
- Distributed by: Studio 37
- Release date: 1994
- Running time: 104 minutes
- Country: Slovenia
- Language: Slovene

Morana is a 1994 Slovenian horror film directed by Aleš Verbič. The film was selected as the Slovenian entry for the Best Foreign Language Film at the 67th Academy Awards, but was not accepted as a nominee.

== Cast ==
- Tanja Dimitrievska as Mojca
- Damjana Grasic as Milena
- Urška Hlebec as Vesna
- Iztok Jereb as Vladimir
- Zoran More as Samo
- Pavle Ravnohrib as Borut
- Nataša Tič Ralijan as Ana
- Borut Veselko as Črt
- Branko Završan as Gorazd
- Vojko Zidar as Rado

== See also ==
- List of submissions to the 67th Academy Awards for Best Foreign Language Film
- List of Slovenian submissions for the Academy Award for Best Foreign Language Film
- Morana (goddess)
