= Zlatko Šugman =

Slovenian actor

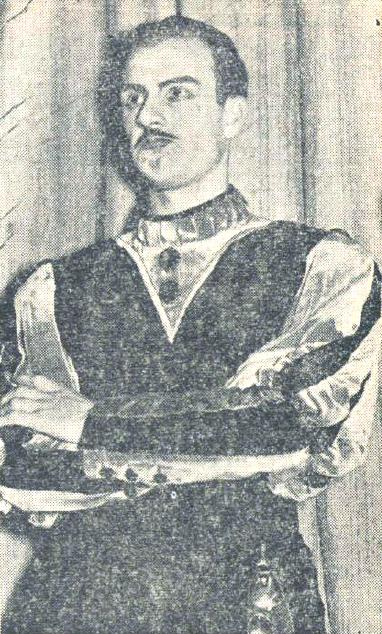
Šugman in the 1950s

Zlatko Šugman (28 August 1932 – 16 December 2008) was one of Slovenia's best known theater, television and film actors.

== Early life and career ==
Šugman was born in Gorišnica, which is located near Ptuj, in what was then Yugoslavia on 28 August 1932. He was a graduate of the Ljubljana Academy of Acting.

He appeared in numerous Slovenian and Yugoslav theater and film roles throughout his decades long career. Known for his comedic work, Šugman's first appeared in the 1962 film, Tistega lepega dne (One Fine Day), which was directed by France Štiglic. On television, Šugman appeared in monodramas, comedy series and children's shows.

Šugman was a member of the SLG Celje Theater from 1958 until 1961 and the SNG Drama Maribor in Maribor, Slovenia, from 1961 until 1965. He remained a member of the Mestno gledalisce ljubljansko (MGL) theatre, the Ljubljana city theater, for 27 years.

Šugman's awards and honors included the Prešeren Prize, which is the highest Slovenian national award for lifetime achievement in the arts. He also received the Borstnik Ring for lifetime achievement in the theater. In 2001, Šugman was awarded the Jezek Award for his television achievements. The Jezek jury noted his skill in expressing both humor and pain on screen.

Zlatko Šugman died in his home in Ljubljana, Slovenia, on 16 December 2008, at the age of 76. His death was announced by the Mestno gledalisce ljubljansko (MGL) theatre.
