= Nevidni bataljon =

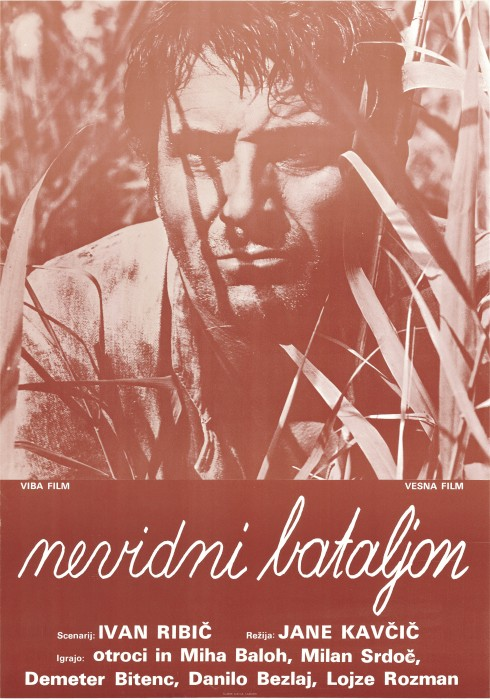
- Directed by: Jane Kavčič
- Written by: Ivan Ribičič
- Starring: Miha Baloh; Danilo Bezlaj; Miha Draganc; Martin Lumbar; Lojze Rozman; Janez Škof
- Music by: Mario Rijavec
- Release date: 24 November 1967
- Running time: 80 minutes
- Country: Yugoslavia
- Language: Slovene

Nevidni bataljon (The Invisible Battalion) is a 1967 Slovene film directed by Jane Kavčič.

== Plot summary ==
A group of German soldiers begins to feel safe from partisan attacks while staying in a small town, far from the mountains where the fighting is taking place. Local lads, unhappy with their elders' passive stance, organise themselves into a group and take action. They write anti-German slogans all over the town and the Germans become more alert. A prisoner escapes and the boys decide to help him. They succeed despite the dangers.
