= Miha Kralj =

Slovene musician (b. 1949)

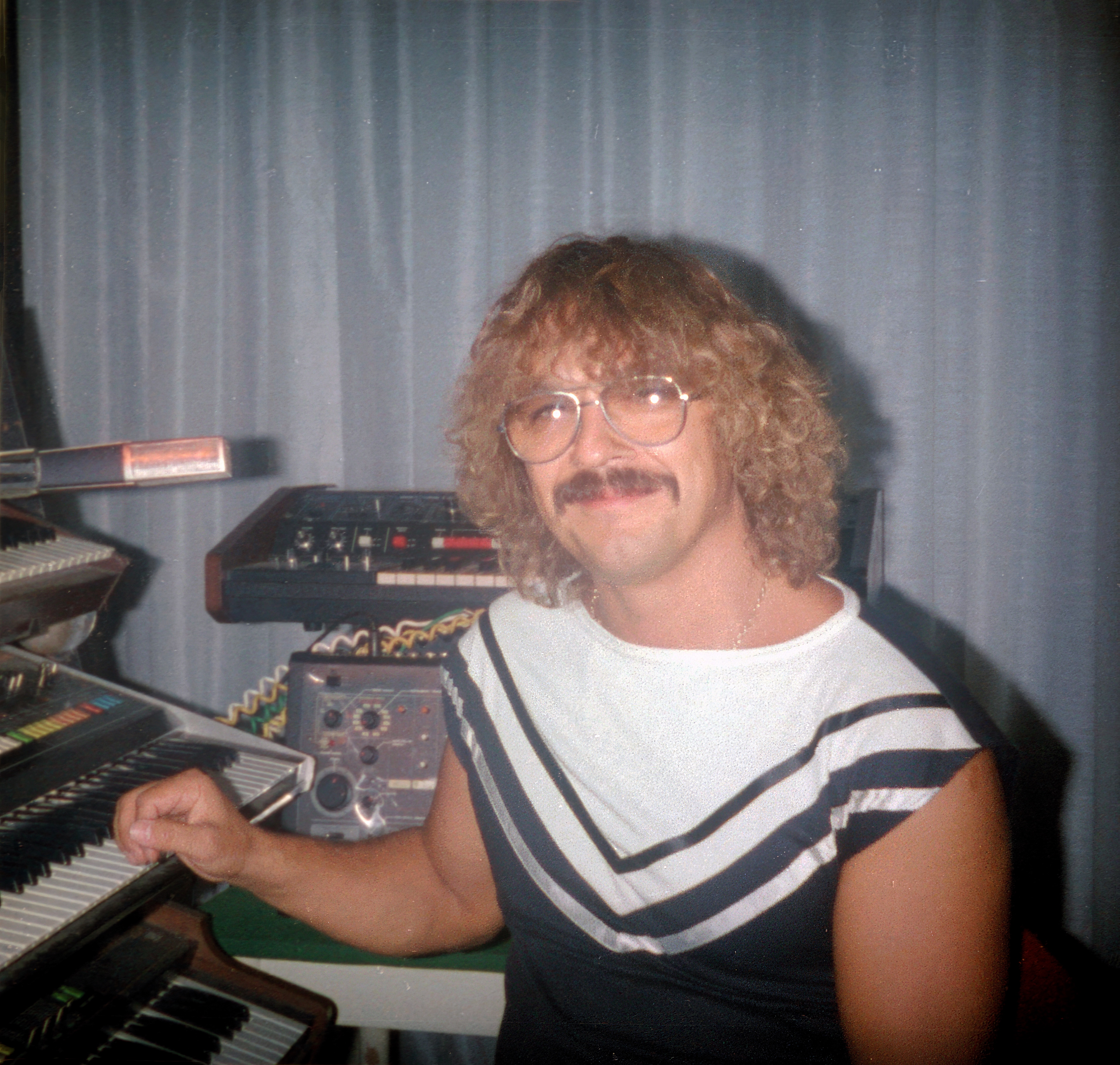

Background information
- Born: Miha Kralj; 22 August 1949 (age 76); Ljubljana, SR Slovenia, SFR Yugoslavia
- Genres: Ambient; new-age; electronic
- Occupations: Composer; performer; record producer; singer
- Instruments: Synthesizer; piano; organ
- Years active: 1960s–present
- Labels: PGP-RTB
- Website: www.mihakralj.com

Miha Kralj (Slovene: [míha králj]; born 22 August 1949) is a Slovene composer, singer, performer and record producer. He is a pioneer in the electronic, ambient and new-age musical genres in Slovenia and former SFR Yugoslavia. He is also called "Yugoslavian Jean-Michel Jarre".

== Biography ==
As a child he attended musical school and played accordion and piano. In the 1960s and 1970s he played electrical synthesizer Bauer, Moog, Vox and Hammond. In various pop-rock groups he played musical keyboard. He was one of the first who had Melotron, Hammond, Poly Moog, Roland-Jupiter8 synthesizers. He performed in many Ljubljana's pubs where he was playing with musical notes according to artistic performances and where various music could be played. At café Slon, Milan Hribar performed with his group called Intervali, who invited Kralj to perform with him. They performed regularly in Motel Jasnica near Kočevje. When departing from Intervali, Kralj performed with Hribar in Austria and Germany with the group Celeias, who became a contributing group of the German singer Erik Silvester.

He later joined the group Dekameroni (1969–1972), where he wrote his first hit single "Sava šumi". He founded his group called Prah (1975–1980) and the group performed at different places in Slovenia and also at café Slon in Ljubljana. With the musical label Helidon the group released five singles. In the year 1980 Kralj started his solo career and with additional financial investment in buying synthesizers he recorded and released the first ambient and new-age electronic album in SFR Yugoslavia called Andromeda.

ZKP RTVS label didn't accept him as recording musician, so he asked Vilko Avsenik who appointed him to the representative of Belgrade label PGP-RTB Boris Kovačič, where they released his 1980s album Andromeda. Andromeda became a hit and was released in 21.000 copies in SFR Yugoslavia and 100.000 copies in Europe. It was a successful album also in the territory of Benelux, Sweden and USSR. The lead composition from Andromeda became the main composition of Planica ski jumping contests and was played during ski jumping slow motion repeating videos.

In the year 1981 a photographer Dragan Timojević – Belmondo invited Kralj to join a Serbian girl-group Cica-Mace, who previously worked together with Kornelije Kovač, who also used synthesizers for creating their music.

Kralj composed several songs for other Slovene musicians and some people compare Kralj style to be similar to Giorgio Moroder. He also composed scenery film music for documentaries. For director Matjaž Žbontar he composed unforgettable music about China: Paintings from Sechuan, Annapurna, Sri Lanka and from various places in Slovenia. He worked together with various musical groups and as a solo performer on festivals such as Melodije morja in sonca, Slovenska popevka and Pop delavnica. In the year 1980 he received second prize for his single Halo Nataša on festival Slovenska popevka; in 1982 he received the prize of the jury for his single Robot on festival Slovenska popevka. He also received prizes on the festival Melodije morja in sonca. In 1982 he released his second album titled Odyssey. In 1985 he released his third album titled Electric Dreams.

He performed often as a one-man band performer. At café place Emonska klet he performed for 11 years.

== Discography ==
=== Albums ===
- Andromeda (PGP RTB, 1980)
  - A. Embrio, Simfonija c mol, Apokalipsa
  - B. Andromeda, Wizart, Pegaz
- Odyssey (PGP RTB, 1982)
- Electric Dreams (PGP RTB, 1985)
- Parallel Mirror (Andromidia – ANP LP 002, 2022)

=== Other discography ===
- Miha Kralj – Marina (Melodije morja in sonca, 1982)
- Miha Kralj – Robot (Slovenska popevka, 1982 / Pop Rock Ljubljana '82, 1982, ZKP RTV Ljubljana)
- Miha Kralj – Zemlja kliče SOS (Slovenska popevka, 1983)
- Miha Kralj – Zemlja kliče SOS (Telstar – od tod do vesolja – Spacebound, 2013, ZKP RTV Slovenija)
- Miha Kralj – Hočem živet (Metalka 35, 1984, Dokumentarna)
- Miha Kralj – To noč si love machine (Pop delavnica, 1984)
- Duo Error – Moški, moški (Pop delavnica, 1985) (Katarina Toš and Miha Kralj)
- Error – Sence svet (Pop delavnica, 1987) (Darja Šen and Miha Kralj)
- Miha Kralj – Jupiter (1982) (YU Elektronika 1978–1991, 2005)
- Milan Petrovič in Miha Kralj – Nevesta (1983)
- Katja Mihelčič – To nisi ti (1997)
- Katja Mihelčič – Kresnica noči (1999)
- Cica-Mace – Super, Super Marko (singl, 1981, PGP RTB)
- Cica-Mace – Zero (LP, 1981, Jugoton)
