= Early Autumn (film) =

1962 film by Toma Janić

Early Autumn (Rana jesen) is a Croatian film directed by Toma Janić. It was released in 1962. The films stars Miha Baloh and Mira Sardoc.
