= Janez Drozg =

Slovenian actor and director

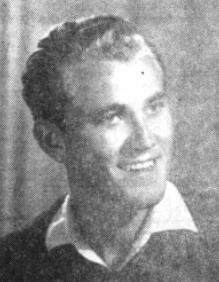
Janez Drozg

Janez Drozg (April 4, 1933 – November 10, 2005) was a Slovene television and film director from Celje. Alongside his work with TV Ljubljana which dominated much of his career, he also directed features films such as Boj na požiralniku in 1982 and even made an appearance as an actor in the 1980 film Prestop (Transgression) playing the character of guard leader.

He was a professor at the Academy for Theatre, Radio, Film and Television (AGRFT), a media institution of radio film and television in Slovenia based in the capital Ljubljana.

He died in Ljubljana on November 10, 2005.
