= Boštjan Hladnik =

Yugoslav-Slovene filmmaker (1929–2006)

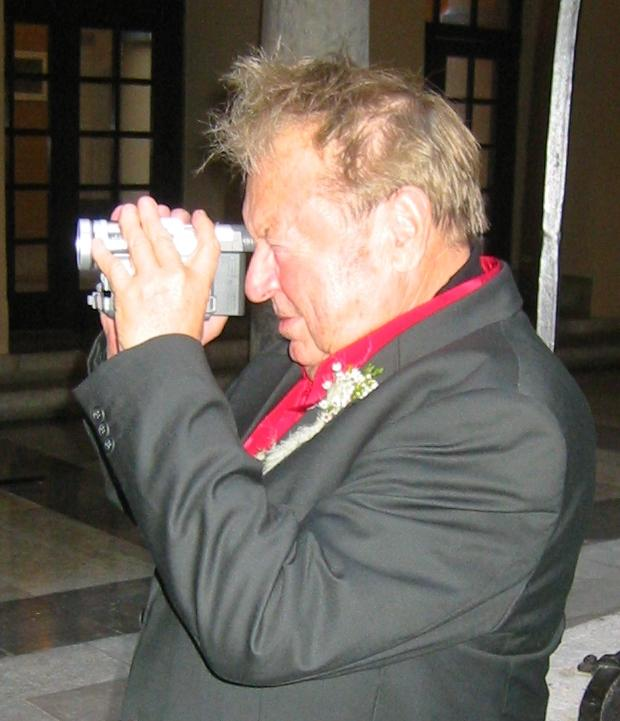
Boštjan Hladnik

Boštjan Hladnik (30 January 1929 – 30 May 2006) was a Yugoslav/Slovene filmmaker.

Hladnik was born in Kranj. He started with amateur short films after acquiring a projector and a 8mm camera in 1947. From 1949 he studied at the Academy for Theatre, Radio, Film and Television in Ljubljana and made a name for himself with several highly acclaimed short films. In 1957, Hladnik moved to Paris to apprentice under French filmmakers such as Claude Chabrol, Philippe de Broca, and Robert Siodmak. Hladnik's early-'60s features, Ples v dežju (Dance in the Rain) (1961) and Peščeni grad/Sand Castle (1962), influenced the course of Yugoslav cinema, through integrating influences from the nouvelle vague into it. Hladnik has an obsession with eroticism. He made many films dealing openly with sex and his Erotikon (1963), with its openly sensual approach to taboo sexual relationships, not only triggered angry protests in the press, but it also led to it being banned in some Yugoslav republics. Western European critics and public however, supported Hladnik enough for him to find foreign backing for his even more provocative feature film on sexuality, Maškarada/Masquerade (1971). Hladnik died in Ljubljana in 2006.
