= Veselica =

Veselica is a surname of South Slavic origin. Notable people with the surname include:

- Bruno Veselica (1936–2018), Croatian footballer
- Marko Veselica (1936–2017), Croatian politician and economist
- Vladimir Veselica (1938–2013), Croatian politician and economist
