= Idealist (film) =

1976 film

- Directed by: Igor Pretnar
- Written by: Ivan Cankar; Igor Pretnar
- Starring: Radko Polič
- Cinematography: Mile de Gleria
- Edited by: Dušan Povh
- Release date: 15 April 1976
- Running time: 122 minutes
- Country: Yugoslavia
- Language: Slovene

Idealist is a 1976 Yugoslav drama film directed by Igor Pretnar. It was entered into the 10th Moscow International Film Festival where Radko Polič won the award for Best Actor.

== Cast ==
- Radko Polič as Martin Kačur
- Milena Zupančič as Tončka
- Dare Ulaga as Ferjan
- Stevo Žigon as Priest from Zapolje
- Arnold Tovornik as Priest from Blatni Dol
- Bert Sotlar as Mayor from Blatni Dol
- Janez Albreht as Grajžar
- Marjeta Gregorac as Minka
