= Radko Polič =

Slovenian actor (1942–2022)

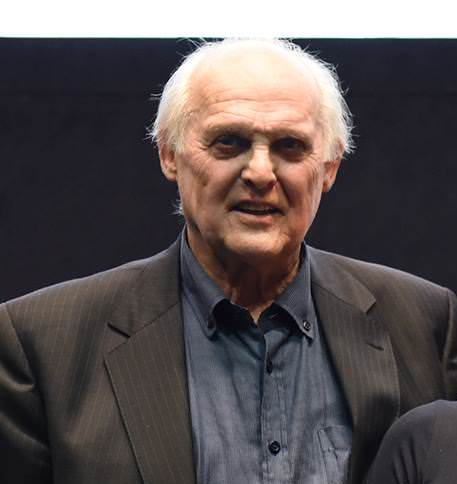
- Born: Radko Polič; 18 August 1942; Črnomelj, Kingdom of Italy (now Slovenia)
- Died: 15 September 2022 (aged 80); Slovenia
- Occupation: Actor
- Years active: 1961–2022

Radko Polič (18 August 1942 – 15 September 2022) was a Slovenian theatre, television and film actor.

== Biography ==
Born in Črnomelj, Polič's family moved to Belgrade in 1945 and then to West Berlin in 1949 before returning to Slovenia and settling in Ljubljana in 1954. He started acting in the early 1960s and during his career spanning over four decades, he played in over 150 theatre and film productions. He starred in stage productions all around Slovenia and appeared in a number of Yugoslav feature films.

Polič won numerous awards for his work, including the Golden Arena for Best Actor at the 1976 Pula Film Festival and the Best Actor award at the 10th Moscow International Film Festival for his role in Igor Pretnar's film Idealist, and the Prešeren Award for Life Achievement in 2007.

Polič was a descendant of Serbs of White Carniola. He died on 15 September 2022, at the age of 80.

The last movie he played in, Good Times, Bad Times by Nevio Marasović, was released in 2023.

== Selected filmography ==
- Battle of Neretva (Bitka na Neretvi, 1969)
- The Widowhood of Karolina Zasler (Vdovstvo Karoline Žašler, 1976)
- Idealist (1976)
- Real Pests (To so gadi, 1977)
- Moment (1978)
- Balkan Express (Balkan Ekspres, 1983)
- In the Jaws of Life (U raljama života, 1984)
- The End of the War (Kraj rata, 1984)
- Taiwan Canasta (Tajvanska kanasta, 1985)
- My Uncle's Legacy (Život sa stricem, 1988)
- Silent Gunpowder (Gluvi barut, 1990)
- Charuga (Čaruga, 1991)
- Mathilde (2004)
- Libertas (2006)
- Night Boats (Noćni brodovi, 2012)
