= Dancing in the Rain (1961 film) =

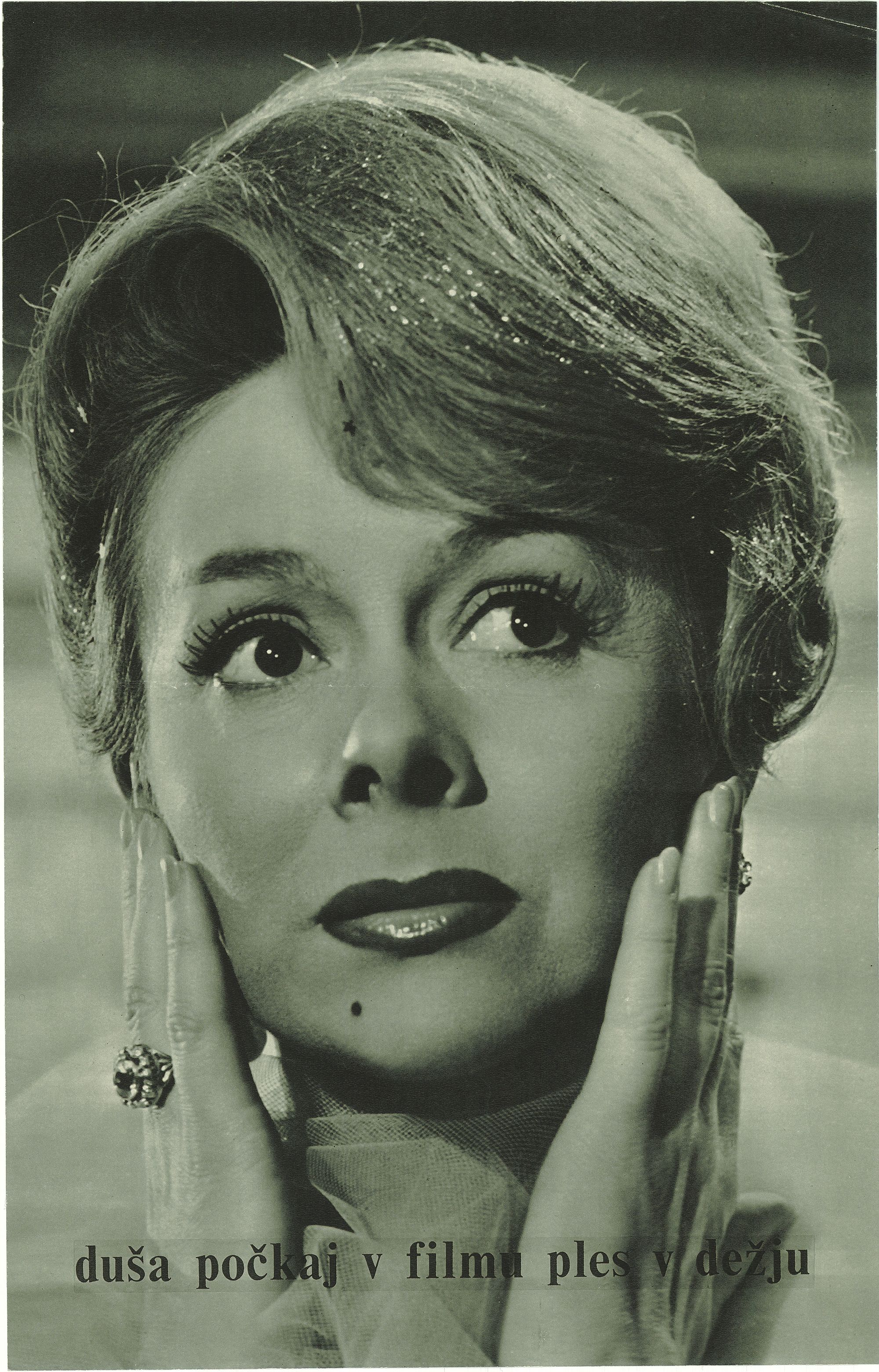
- Slovene: Ples v dežju
- Directed by: Boštjan Hladnik
- Written by: Boštjan Hladnik
- Based on: Črni dnevi in beli dan by Dominik Smole
- Starring: Miha Baloh; Rado Nakrst; Duša Počkaj; Ali Rener; Jože Zupan
- Music by: Bojan Adamič
- Release date: 27 March 1961
- Running time: 100 minutes
- Country: Yugoslavia
- Language: Slovene

Dance in the Rain (Slovene: Ples v dežju) is a 1961 Slovene film directed by Boštjan Hladnik. It is a love drama based on the novel Črni dnevi in beli dan by Dominik Smole.

Dance in the Rain is Hladnik's first feature film after he returned from Paris, where he worked with Claude Chabrol, Robert Siodmak and Philippe de Broca. It is considered the first Slovenian film noir.

On the occasion of the hundredth anniversary of Slovene film in 2005, Slovene film critics of various generations chose Dance in the Rain as the best Slovene film. The Film Fund of the Republic of Slovenia thus funded its DVD release in honour this anniversary. It was the first Slovene film to have its image and sound digitally corrected. A discussion with Boštjan Hladnik was filmed especially for this edition. The director also participated in the choice of other materials included on the DVD: film trailers, excerpts from Enfant Terrible (1993) – the documentary portrait of Boštjan Hladnik directed by Damjan Kozole, excerpts from the television show Povečava ("Magnification", 1991) directed by Franci Slak, and excerpts from the documentary portrait of the actor Miha Baloh (1998) directed by Slavko Hren. Apart from Slovene, it has subtitles in six languages: English, German, French, Italian, Serbian Cyrillic and Croatian.

== Plot summary ==
A love drama of Maruša, an actress and Peter, a painter. He lives in a dark tiny rented room and she lives in a small flat. They both spend most of their time in a pub where they meet. Their relationship is full of uncertainties and contrasts. Peter dreams of perfect beauty and Maruša yearns for lost youth. A bright window to the future shown throughout the film seems to be moving further and further away.
