= Filip Robar Dorin =

Slovenian film director (1940–2023)

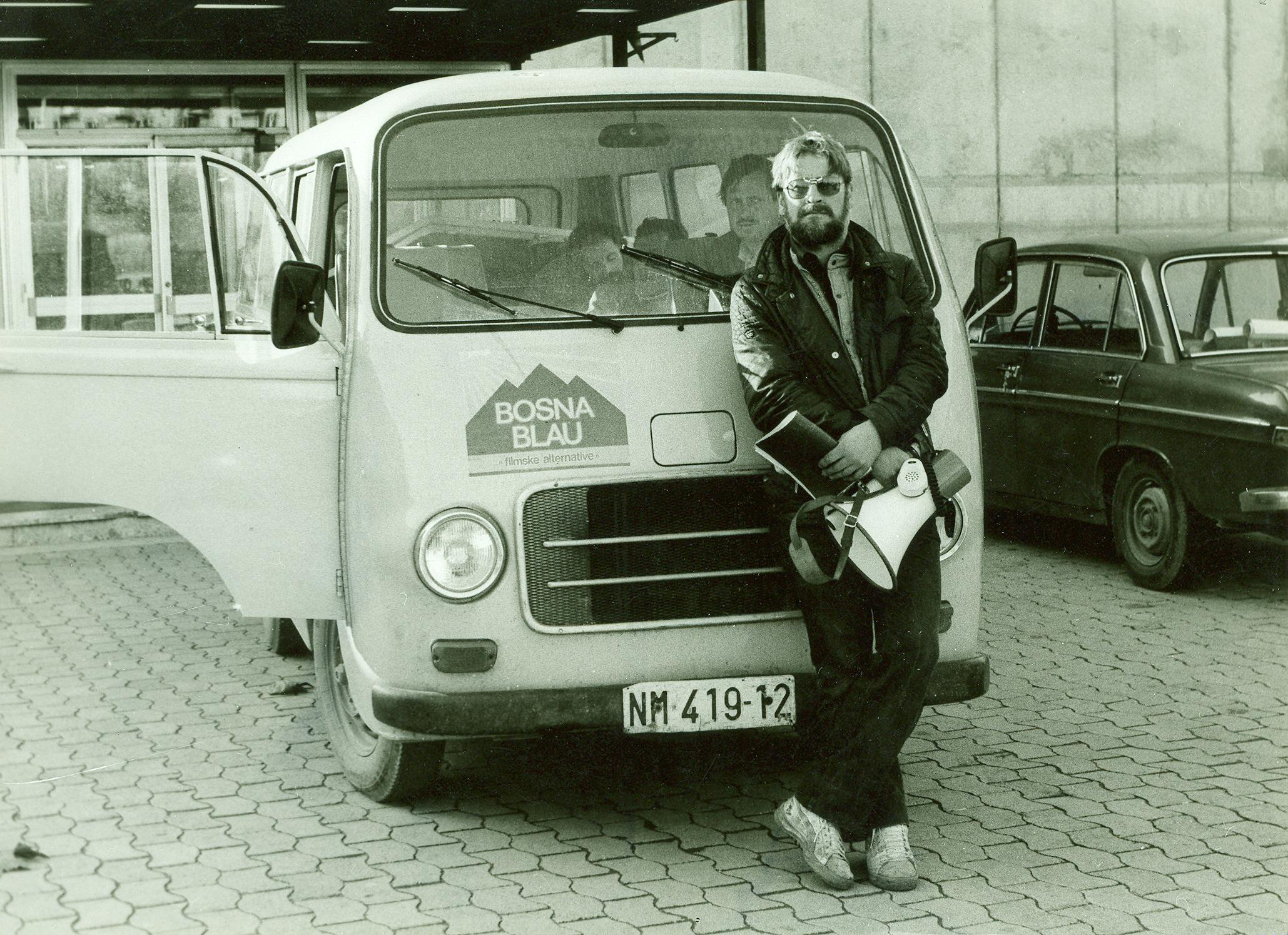
- Robar Dorin (c. 1985)
- Born: 8 September 1940; Bor, Kingdom of Yugoslavia (present-day Serbia)
- Died: 20 November 2023 (aged 83)
- Occupations: Director, screenwriter, film editor
- Years active: 1972–2023

Filip Robar Dorin (8 September 1940 – 20 November 2023) was a Yugoslavian, and later Slovenian, film director, screenwriter, and film editor.

== Life and career ==
Robar Dorin studied comparative literature and philosophy at the University of Ljubljana's Faculty of Arts and later screenwriting, directing, cinematography, and film editing at the Columbia College Chicago, from which he graduated in 1969.

Dorin created some 30 short and medium-length documentary and feature films, as well as twelve full-length films and video portraits of prominent Slovenian poets, writers, musicians, and painters. He received several Slovenian and international film awards, including the Golden Arena for Best Director at the 1990 Pula Film Festival for his film The Windhunter (Slovenian: Veter v mreži).

Robar Dorin died on 20 November 2023, at the age of 83.
