= Igor Pretnar =

Slovenian film director (1924–1977)

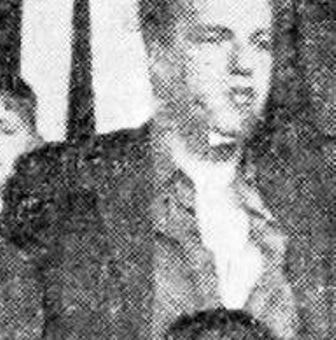
- Igor Pretnar (1924-1977)
- Born: 3 April 1924; Ljubljana, Kingdom of Yugoslavia
- Died: 8 April 1977 (aged 53); Ljubljana, Yugoslavia (present-day Slovenia)
- Years active: 1948–1976

Igor Pretnar (3 April 1924 – 8 April 1977) was a Slovenian film director.

Pretnar won the Golden Arena for Best Director for his film Wild Growth (Samorastniki, 1963) at the 1963 Pula Film Festival. His 1976 film Idealist was entered into the 10th Moscow International Film Festival.

== Selected filmography ==
- Five Minutes of Paradise (Pet minuta raja, 1959)
- Wild Growth (Samorastniki, 1963)
- Idealist (1976)
