= Jože Babič =

Slovenian film director (1917–1996)

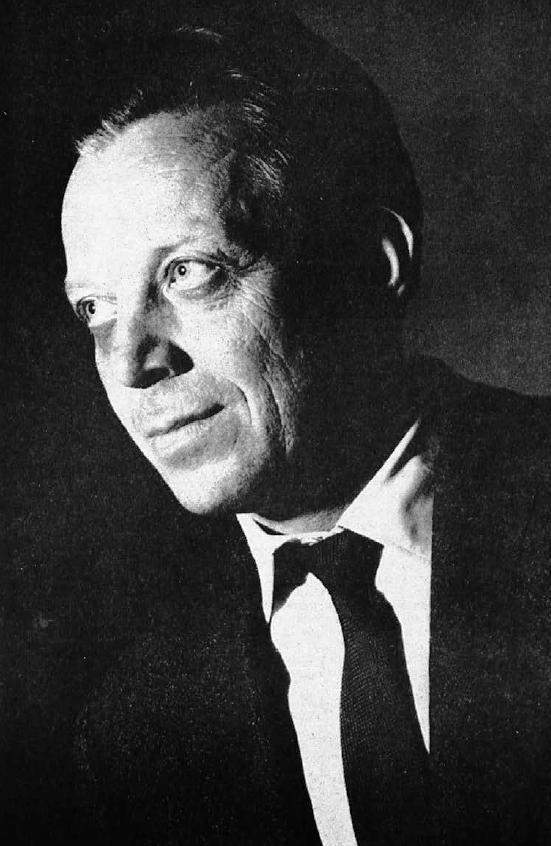
- Born: 13 February 1917; Povžane, Austria-Hungary
- Died: 10 May 1996 (aged 79); Ljubljana, Slovenia
- Years active: 1959–1980

Jože Babič (13 February 1917 – 10 May 1996) was a Slovenian film, theatre and television director.

His two most notable feature films were Three Quarters of a Sun (Tri četrtine sonca, 1959), for which we won the Golden Arena for Best Director at the 1959 Pula Film Festival, and The Party (Veselica, 1960).

== Television ==
- Ščuke pa ni, ščuke pa ne (1980), Slovenian television comedy series, director
