= France Štiglic =

Slovenian film director (1919–1993)

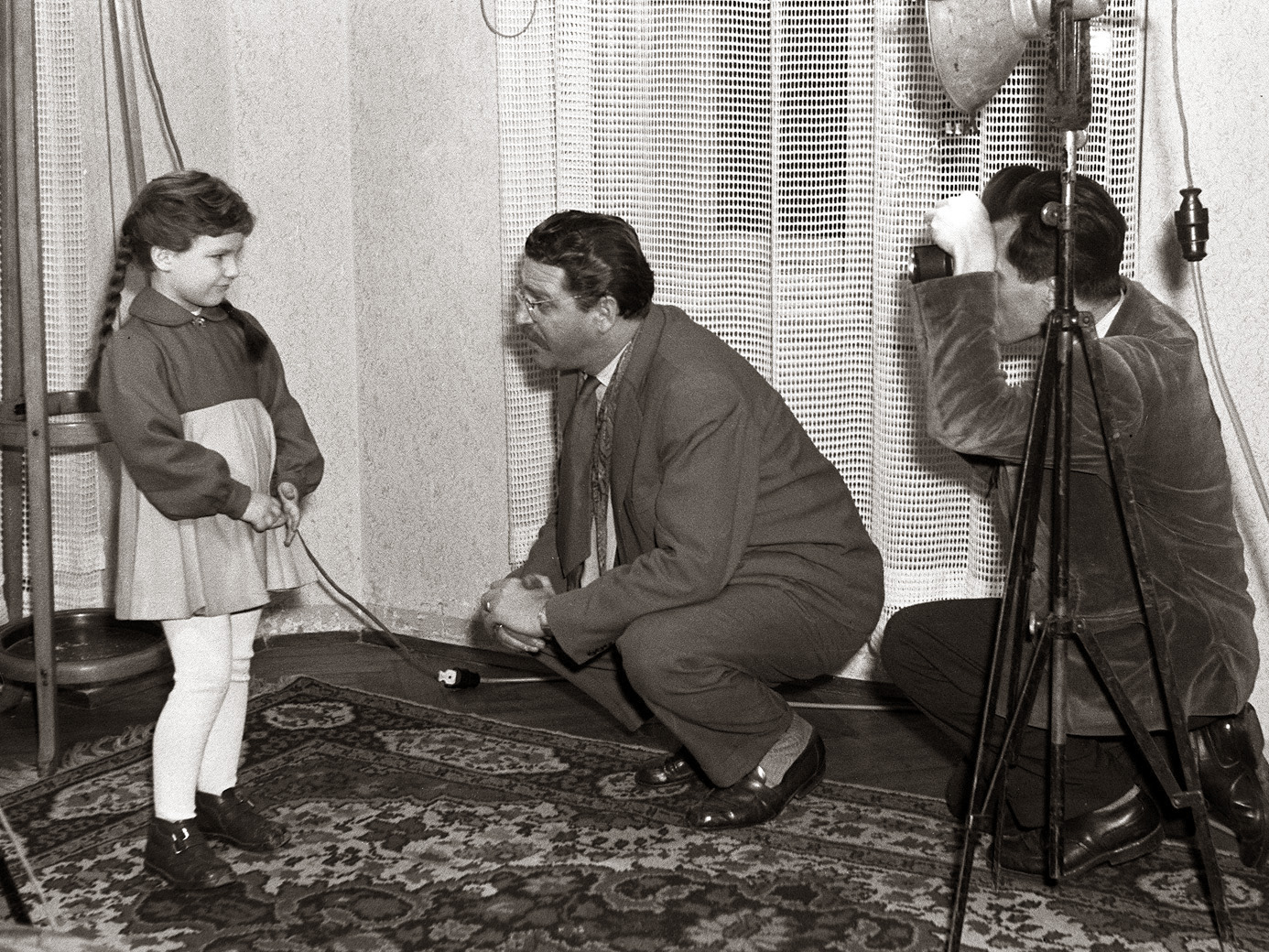
- Director France Štiglic and his assistant Maks Sajk are selecting actors for the film Valley of Peace.
- Born: 12 November 1919; Kranj, Kingdom of Serbs, Croats and Slovenes
- Died: 4 May 1993 (aged 73); Ljubljana, Slovenia
- Occupations: Film director, screenwriter
- Years active: 1946–1984

France Štiglic (12 November 1919 – 4 May 1993) was a Slovenian film director and screenwriter. His 1948 film On Our Own Land was entered into the 1949 Cannes Film Festival. His film The Ninth Circle (1960) was Yugoslavia's submission for the Academy Award for Best Foreign Language Film at the 33rd Academy Awards, where it was shortlisted for the award.

== Selected filmography ==
- On Our Own Land (Na svoji zemlji, 1948)
- Valley of Peace (Dolina miru, 1956)
- The Ninth Circle (Deveti krug, 1960)
- Ballad About a Trumpet and a Cloud (Balada o trobenti in oblaku, 1961)
- Don't Cry, Peter (Ne joči, Peter, 1964)
- Amandus (1966)
- Story of Good People (Povest o dobrih ljudeh, 1975)
