= Ljubljana Slovene National Theatre Drama =

Theatre in Slovenia

Coordinates: 46°02′56″N 14°30′04″E

- Slovensko narodno gledališče Drama Ljubljana, SNG Drama Ljubljana
- Slovene National Theatre Drama in Ljubljana
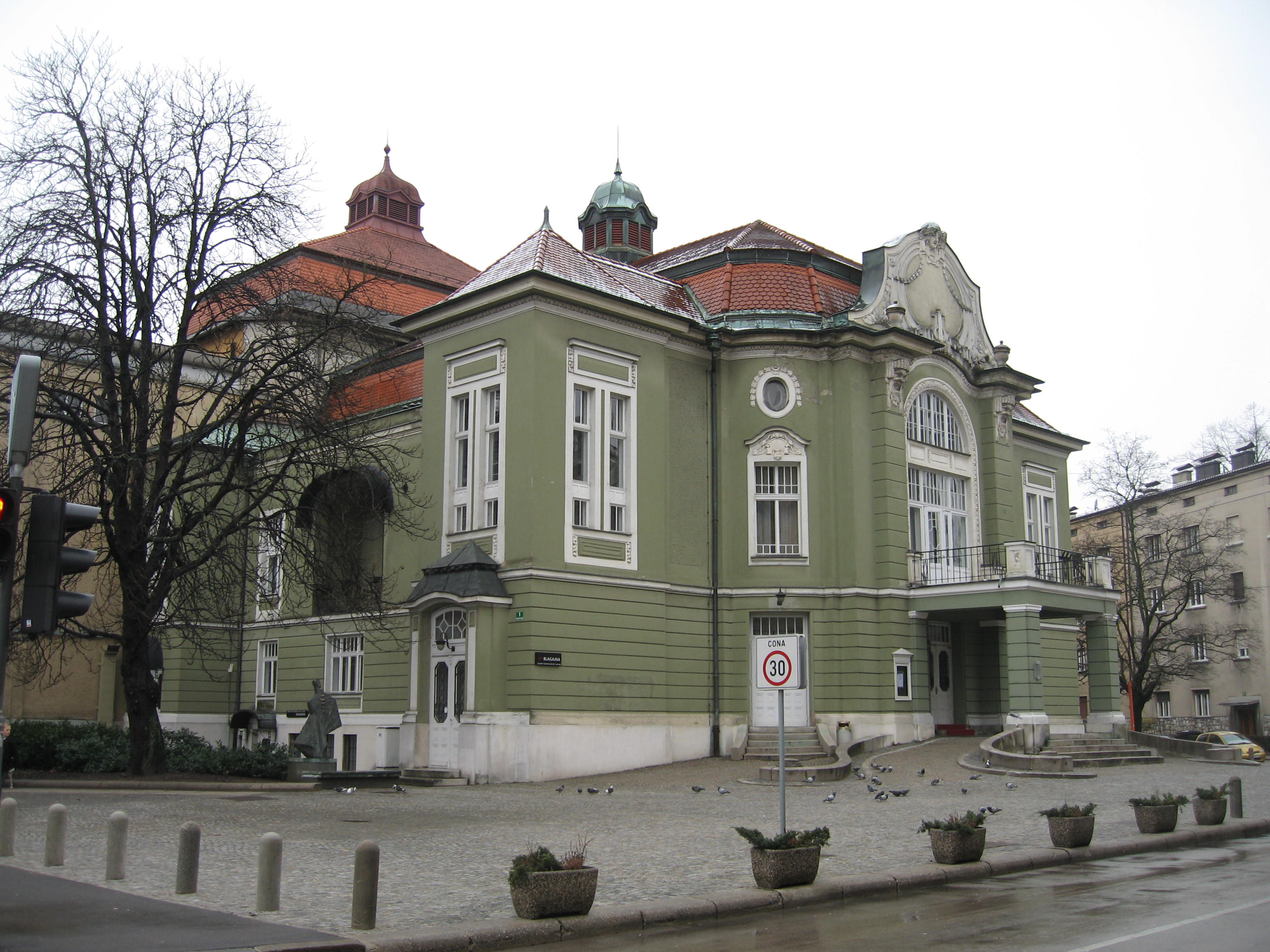
- Ljubljana Drama Theatre
- Location: Ljubljana, Slovenia
- Type: Theatre

The Ljubljana Slovene National Theatre Drama (Slovene: Slovensko narodno gledališče Drama Ljubljana, SNG Drama Ljubljana), or the Slovene National Theatre Drama in Ljubljana, is the national theatre in Ljubljana, Slovenia, best known for its conservative repertoire, including classical European dramatic texts and selected contemporary non-commercial European and Slovene ones. Its seat is the Ljubljana Drama Theatre (ljubljanska Drama) to the southeast of the Slovene Museum of Natural History and southwest of the University of Ljubljana, at 1 Erjavec Street (Erjavčeva cesta 1). It is an Art Nouveau building originally of the city's German Theatre (German: Deutsches Theater).

== History ==
The theatre is heir to the first ever Slovene-language drama performance, staged on 24 October 1867 by the Slovene Dramatic Society in the premises of the Ljubljana Reading Society. After collapse of Austria-Hungary, it was renamed in the short-lived State of Slovenes, Croats and Serbs the National Theatre, and in 1919 the Provincial Theatre. In the Kingdom of Yugoslavia it was renamed the Royal Theatre.

During World War II in Slovene Lands, it operated under the names State Theatre and the Slovene National Theatre on Liberated Territory. After the war, it was renamed Drama of the Slovene National Theatre. Its current name, SNG DRAMA, dates from 1992.

== Branches ==
The theatre is one of three branches of the Slovene National Theatre (SNG).

- Ljubljana Slovene National Theatre Opera and Ballet
- Maribor Slovene National Theatre
- Nova Gorica Slovene National Theatre
