= Academy of Theatre, Radio, Film and Television (Ljubljana) =

Film school of the University of Ljubljana

Coordinates: 46°3′8.75″N 14°30′17.04″E

The Academy of Theatre, Radio, Film and Television (Slovene: Akademija za gledališče, radio, film in televizijo or AGRFT) is an academy of the University of Ljubljana in Ljubljana, Slovenia. It is the only college and graduate school in Slovenia with a similar curriculum. It is composed of three colleges: the College for Theatre and Radio, the College for Film and Television, and College for Screen and Play Writing. In addition, a Center for Theatre and Film Studies is included in the academy. The current dean is Aleš Valič.

== History ==
The academy was founded in 1945. At the beginning, it was only an academy for theatre. Gradually, the sections for radio, film and television studies were added to the curriculum. In 1963 the academy adopted its current name. Since 1975 it has been an autonomous member of the University of Ljubljana, along with the Academy of Music and the Academy of Fine Arts and Design.

The academy offers both undergraduate and graduate study programs, including internships in all available fields.

== Professors ==
Notable professors have included:

- Darja Švajger, singer
- Karpo Godina, film director
- Jožica Avbelj, actress
- Meta Hočevar, stage director, screenwriter, art decorator, costume designer
- Andrej Inkret, theatre critic
- Dušan Jovanović, playwright, director
- Primož Kozak, playwright and essayist
- Mile Korun, stage director
- Pino Mlakar, choreographer
- Franci Slak, director, producer, screenwriter
- Josip Vidmar, literary critic and theorist
- Matjaž Zupančič, director, playwright
