= Prešeren Award =

Slovenian art award

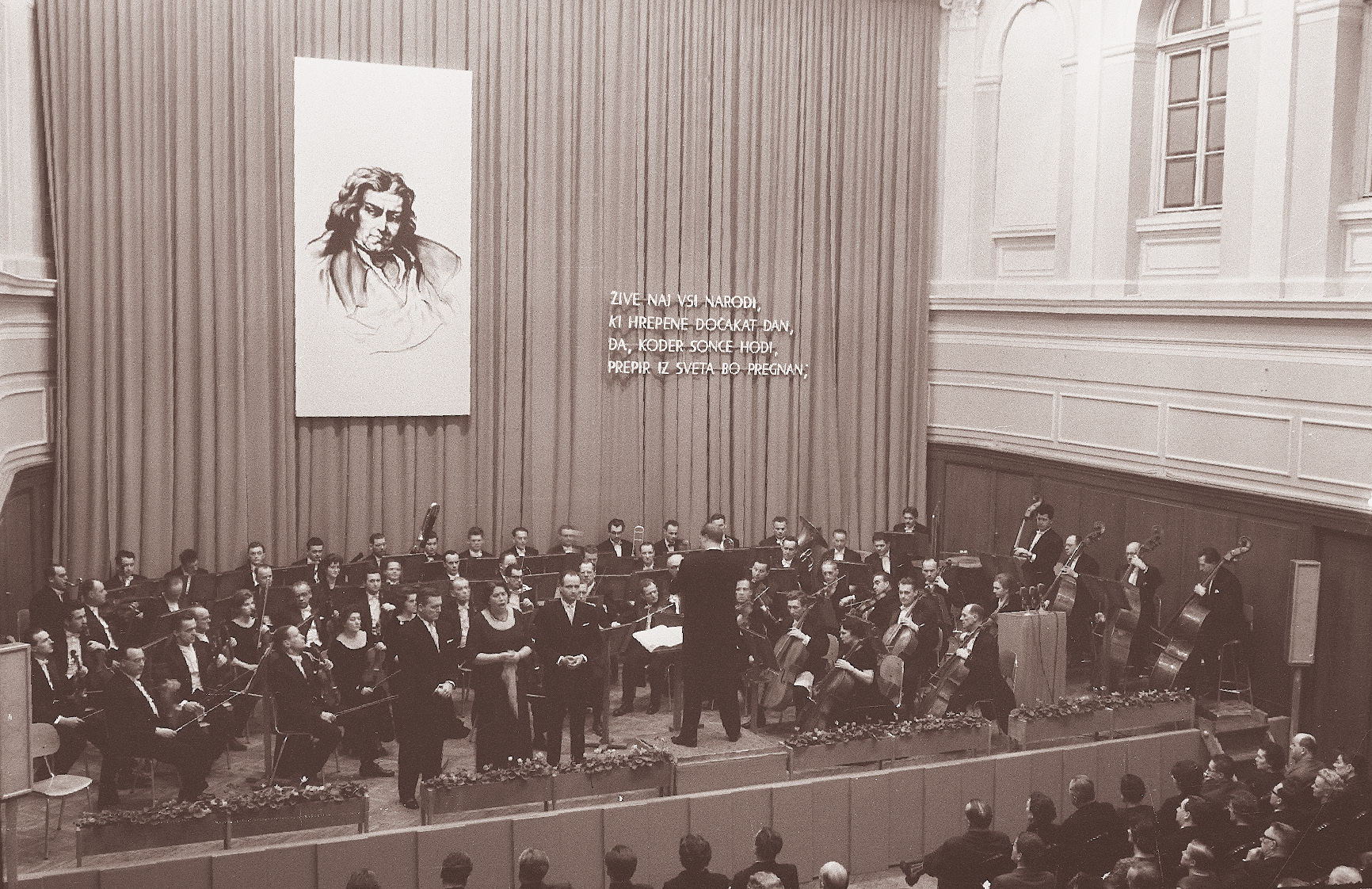
1961 Prešeren Award Ceremony

The Prešeren Award (Slovene: Prešernova nagrada), also called the Grand Prešeren Award (Slovene: Velika Prešernova nagrada), is the highest decoration in the field of artistic and in the past also scientific creation in Slovenia. It is awarded each year by the Prešeren Fund (Prešernov sklad) to two eminent Slovene artists, with the provision that their work was presented to the public at least two years ago. In general, it may be given to an artist only once, and can also be given to a group of artists. It is given on the eve of the Prešeren Day, the Slovenian cultural holiday celebrated on the anniversary of the death of France Prešeren, the Slovene national poet. On the same occasion, the Prešeren Fund Awards (nagrade Prešernovega sklada) or Small Prešeren Awards (male Prešernove nagrade) are given to up to six artists. The awardees also receive a financial award, with the Prešeren Award three times as high as the Prešeren Fund Award. In recent years, the awards have been increasingly given for lifetime work.

== History ==
The Prešeren Award was for the first time bestowed in 1947, on the basis of a decree from 1946. It was originally given on 8 February, Prešeren Day, the holiday commemorating the anniversary of the death of the Slovene national poet France Prešeren. In 1955, the first act on the Prešeren awards was passed. By it, the award gained its current name and the Prešeren Fund was established, which by the amendments of the act in 1956 became a legal personality. Since 1961, the awards were conferred also for the lifetime work. In addition, the Prešeren Fund Award was introduced. Since that year, these awards have been conferred only for exceptional achievements in the field of arts. In 1982, the Prešeren Fund came under the auspice of the Cultural Community of Slovenia. At most three Prešeren Awards and ten Prešeren Fund Awards were given. Since 1991, when the Prešeren Award Act (Zakon o Prešernovi nagradi) was passed, the Fund works under the auspice of the Slovenian administrative body in charge of culture. According to the act, at most two awards may be given.

== Prešeren Fund ==
The Prešeren Award and the Prešeren Fund Award are bestowed by the Prešeren Fund Management Board (Upravni odbor Prešernovega sklada). Its 15 members are artists or other cultural workers, like critics, historians, and theoreticians. They are nominated by the Slovenian Government and elected for a four-year term by the National Assembly of Slovenia. The board, which was last elected in May 2008, elected Jaroslav Skrušny as its chair in July 2008. The Prešeren Fund now operates under the auspice of the Slovenian Ministry of Culture. In an interview in February 2012, Skrušny described the work by the Board as independent and denied any political pressure in the past few years.

== Selection and proclamation of the winners ==
On 10 February, the Prešeren Fund announces a public tender, which lasts until 15 September. Any physical or legal person may nominate authors for the award, but have to provide appropriate rationale and references. About 100 proposals are put forward each year, the majority of proposals from the performing arts. The selection is based on artistic value of the works by the proposed artists as well as other criteria, such as the equal representation of gender, regions, generations, and world views, trying to achieve a balanced and plural choice. Both the established artists and debitants have won the award. The nominees are then selected by the four field committees of the Prešeren Fund, each comprising seven members named by the Prešeren Fund Management Board. Each committee proposes two names for the Prešeren Award and six names for the Prešeren Fund Award, altogether eight for the great award and 24 for the little award. The board then makes the final selection with a secret vote in November after a long discussion and proclaims the awardees after they are elected by two thirds of members. If necessary, more voting rounds may take place. Although in the past, the names of the awardees were announced already on 3 December, the date of the anniversary of Prešeren's births, in the last years they have remained secret until the award ceremony.

== Review of the awardees ==
Since Slovenian declaration of independence in 1991, the majority of the Prešeren Award winners have been literary artists, among them the only woman being Makarovič, who declined the award in 2000 but accepted the money. From the field of performing arts, only two artists won the award. From the field of music, the awardees have been mainly composers and conductors, with the only instrumentalist being the flautist Irena Grafenauer. A general trend of older men active in institutionalised arts is recognisable among the awardees. The group of the Prešeren Fund Award winners is more diverse.

== See also ==
- List of Prešeren laureates
