= List of Slovenian submissions for the Academy Award for Best International Feature Film =

Best International Feature Film submissions from Slovenia

Highlights
- Debut: 1993
- Submissions: 30
- Nominations: none
- Oscar winners: none

Slovenia has submitted films for the Academy Award for Best International Feature Film (Note: The category was previously named the Academy Award for Best Foreign Language Film, but this was changed to the Academy Award for Best International Feature Film in April 2019, after the Academy deemed the word "Foreign" to be outdated.) since 1993. The award is handed out annually by the United States Academy of Motion Picture Arts and Sciences to a feature-length motion picture produced outside the United States that contains primarily non-English dialogue. It was not created until the 1956 Academy Awards, in which a competitive Academy Award of Merit, known as the Best Foreign Language Film Award, was created for non-English speaking films, and has been given annually since.

As of 2026, Slovenia has submitted thirty films, but none of them were nominated.

== Submissions ==
The Academy of Motion Picture Arts and Sciences has invited the film industries of various countries to submit their best film for the Academy Award for Best International Feature Film since 1956. The International Feature Film Committee oversees the process and reviews all the submitted films. Following this, they vote via secret ballot to determine the five nominees for the award.

The country was a republic within Yugoslavia until 1991. The Ninth Circle (1960) was submitted representing Yugoslavia, and became the first and only film directed by a Slovenian to be nominated in the category.

All the films submitted are primary in Slovene. Below is a list of the films that have been submitted by Slovenia for review by the Academy for the award by year and the respective Academy Awards ceremony.

Year (Ceremony)	Film title used in nomination	Original title	Director(s)	Result
1993 (66th)	When I Close My Eyes	Ko zaprem oči	Franci Slak	Not nominated
1994 (67th)	Morana		Aleš Verbič	Not nominated
1996 (69th)	Felix		Božo Šprajc	Not nominated
1997 (70th)	Outsider	Avtsajder	Andrej Košak	Not nominated
2001 (74th)	Bread and Milk	Kruh in mleko	Jan Cvitkovič	Not nominated
2002 (75th)	Headnoise	Zvenenje v glavi	Andrej Košak	Not nominated
2003 (76th)	Spare Parts	Rezervni deli	Damjan Kozole	Not nominated
2004 (77th)	Beneath Her Window	Pod njenim oknom	Metod Pevec	Not nominated
2005 (78th)	Ruins	Ruševine	Janez Burger	Not nominated
2006 (79th)	Gravehopping	Odgrobadogroba	Jan Cvitkovič	Not nominated
2007 (80th)	Short Circuits	Kratki stiki	Janez Lapajne	Not nominated
2008 (81st)	Rooster's Breakfast	Petelinji zajtrk	Marko Naberšnik	Not nominated
2009 (82nd)	Landscape No. 2	Pokrajina Št. 2	Vinko Möderndorfer	Not nominated
2010 (83rd)	9:06		Igor Šterk	Not nominated
2011 (84th)	Silent Sonata	Circus Fantasticus	Janez Burger	Disqualified
2012 (85th)	A Trip	Izlet	Nejc Gazvoda	Not nominated
2013 (86th)	Class Enemy	Razredni sovražnik	Rok Biček	Not nominated
2014 (87th)	Seduce Me	Zapelji me	Marko Šantić	Not nominated
2015 (88th)	The Tree	Drevo	Sonja Prosenc	Not nominated
2016 (89th)	Houston, We Have a Problem!	Houston, imamo problem!	Žiga Virc	Not nominated
2017 (90th)	The Miner	Rudar	Hanna Slak	Not nominated
2018 (91st)	Ivan		Janez Burger	Not nominated
2019 (92nd)	History of Love	Zgodovina ljubezni	Sonja Prosenc	Not nominated
2020 (93rd)	Stories from the Chestnut Woods	Zgodbe iz kostanjevih gozdov	Gregor Božič	Not nominated
2021 (94th)	Sanremo		Miroslav Mandič	Not nominated
2022 (95th)	Orchestra	Orkester	Matevž Luzar	Not nominated
2023 (96th)	Riders	Jezdeca	Dominik Mencej	Not nominated
2024 (97th)	Family Therapy	Odrešitev za začetnike	Sonja Prosenc	Not nominated
2025 (98th)	Little Trouble Girls	Kaj ti je deklica	Urška Djukić	Not nominated
2026 (99th)	Fantasy		Kukla	Pending

== See also ==
- List of Yugoslav submissions for the Academy Award for Best International Feature Film
- List of Academy Award winners and nominees for Best International Feature Film
- List of Slovenian films
