= Directors Guild (disambiguation) =

Directors Guild usually refers to the Directors Guild of America.

Directors Guild or Guild of Directors may also refer to:

- Australian Directors Guild
- Directors Guild of Canada
- Directors Guild of Great Britain (defunct; replaced by Directors UK)
- Directors Guild of Japan
- Directors Guild of Nigeria
- Directors Guild of Slovenia
- German Directors Guild
- Hong Kong Film Directors' Guild
- Screen Directors Guild of New Zealand

== See also ==
- List of unions for film directing
