= Räsänen =

Räsänen is Finnish surname. Notable people with the surname include:

- Eino Räsänen (1921–1997), Finnish politician
- Jari Räsänen (born 1966), Finnish former cross country skier
- Juha-Matti Räsänen (born 1974), Finnish strongman competitor
- Pauliina Räsänen, Finnish circus performer and actress
- Pauli Räsänen (1935–2017), Finnish physician and politician
- Päivi Räsänen (born 1959), Finnish politician
- Veli Räsänen (1888–1953), Finnish lichenologist
- Martti Räsänen (1893–1976), Finnish linguist and turkologist
