= DGN (disambiguation) =

DGN are computer-aided design file formats.

DGN may also refer to:

- Asia Dragon Trust, British investment fund (LSE ticker:DGN)
- Directors Guild of Nigeria, Nigerian film association
- Disc Golf Network, TV station for the Disc Golf Pro Tour
- Downers Grove North, high school in Illinois, US
- Wardaman language, spoken in Northern Australia (ISO 639-3:dgn)
