= Teorema =

1968 film by Pier Paolo Pasolini

- Theatrical release poster
- Directed by: Pier Paolo Pasolini
- Written by: Pier Paolo Pasolini
- Produced by: Franco Rossellini; Manolo Bolognini
- Starring: Silvana Mangano; Terence Stamp; Massimo Girotti; Anne Wiazemsky; Laura Betti; Andrés José Cruz Soublette; Alfonso Gatto; Carlo De Mejo
- Cinematography: Giuseppe Ruzzolini
- Edited by: Nino Baragli
- Music by: Ennio Morricone
- Production company: Aetos Film
- Distributed by: Euro International Film
- Release dates: 4 September 1968 (Venice); 7 September 1968 (Italy)
- Running time: 98 minutes
- Country: Italy
- Language: Italian

Teorema (English: "Theorem" (Note: The film is known in some English-speaking territories, including the United Kingdom, as Theorem.)) is a 1968 Italian allegorical art film written and directed by Pier Paolo Pasolini. The film centers on an upper-class Milanese family who are introduced to, and then abandoned by, an otherworldly man with a mysterious divine force. Themes include the timelessness of divinity and the spiritual corruption of the bourgeoisie.

Pasolini's sixth film, it was the first time he had worked primarily with professional actors. British actor Terence Stamp stars as the mysterious Visitor, along with Silvana Mangano, Massimo Girotti, Anne Wiazemsky and Laura Betti. Other roles are played by Andrés José Cruz Soublette, Ninetto Davoli, Alfonso Gatto and Carlo De Mejo.

The film was nominated for the Golden Lion 29th Venice International Film Festival, while Laura Betti won the Volpi Cup for Best Actress for her performance.

== Plot ==
A mysterious figure known only as The Visitor appears in the lives of a typical bourgeois Italian family. His arrival is heralded at the gates of the family's Milanese estate by an arm-flapping postman. The enigmatic stranger soon engages in sexual affairs with all members of the household: the devoutly religious maid, the sensitive son, the sexually repressed mother, the timid daughter and, finally, the tormented father.

The stranger gives unstintingly of himself, asking nothing in return. He stops the passionate maid from committing suicide with a gas hose and tenderly consoles her; he befriends and sleeps with the frightened son, soothing his doubts and anxiety and endowing him with confidence; he seduces the bored and dissatisfied mother, giving her sexual joy and fulfilment; he cares for and comforts the despondent and ailing father; and he becomes emotionally intimate with the overprotected daughter, removing her childish innocence about men.

One day the herald returns and announces that the stranger will soon leave the household, just as suddenly and mysteriously as he came. In the subsequent void of the stranger's absence, each family member is forced to confront what was previously concealed by the trappings of bourgeois life.

The maid returns to the rural village where she was born and is seen to perform miracles; ultimately, she immolates herself by having her body buried in dirt while shedding ecstatic tears of regeneration. The daughter sinks into a catatonic state and is institutionalized; the son leaves the family home to become an artist, obsessively drawing the stranger's face; the mother seeks sexual encounters with young men; and the father strips himself of all material effects, handing his factory over to its workers, removing his clothes at a railway station and wandering naked across the slopes of Mount Etna, where he ultimately screams in primal rage and despair.

== Cast ==
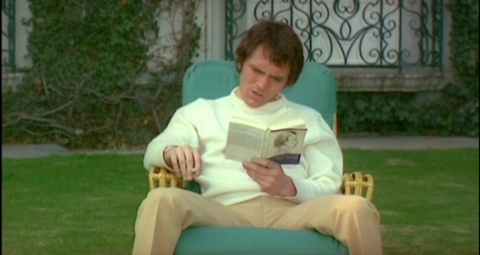
Terence Stamp as The Visitor

- Terence Stamp as The Visitor
- Silvana Mangano as Lucia, the mother
- Massimo Girotti as Paolo, the father
- Anne Wiazemsky as Odetta, the daughter
- Laura Betti as Emilia, the maid
- Andrés José Cruz Soublette as Pietro, the son
- Ninetto Davoli as Angelino, the postman
- Carlo De Mejo, Luigi Barbini, and Giovanni Ivan Scratuglia as male prostitutes
- Adele Cambria as the second maid
- Alfonso Gatto as the doctor

Uncredited

- Cesare Garboli as a journalist
- Susanna Pasolini as an old peasant woman

== Production ==
Teorema was Pier Paolo Pasolini's sixth feature film and the first to use principally professional actors rather than the amateurs and newcomers the director had employed for his previous works.

Shooting took place at various locations around Milan, whilst the final sequence was shot on the slopes of Mount Etna, in Sicily.

Terence Stamp's voice was dubbed by an uncredited Pino Colizzi for the original Italian version of the film.

== Release ==
=== Home media ===
On 4 October 2005 Koch-Lorber Films released Teorema on DVD in the United States.

On 18 February 2020 The Criterion Collection released a Blu-ray and DVD of Teorema in North America.

In the United Kingdom the British Film Institute produced a Blu-ray disc and the film is available for streaming via its BFI Player platform.

== Reception ==
On its release the religious right and the Vatican criticized the sexual content of the film. Others considered the film "ambiguous" and "visionary". The film won a special award at the Venice Film Festival from the International Catholic Film Office, only for the award to be withdrawn later when the Vatican protested.

Scholars view the film differently owing to the openness or ambiguity of the film. The author of A Certain Realism: Making Use of Pasolini's Film Theory and Practice, Maurizio Viano, says that in order to understand the film there must be "adequate translation". Most scholars writing about the film do not discuss Pasolini's cinematographic techniques but his philosophical arguments. Viano argues that Pasolini intended to be theoretical in this film because he wanted to be recognised as "a film theorist".

Pasolini and producer Donato Leoni were charged with obscenity by the Public Prosecutor's Office of Rome but were acquitted after only an hour's deliberations.

On review aggregator website Rotten Tomatoes, the film holds an approval rating of 83% based on 30 reviews, with an average rating of 7.6/10.

=== Accolades ===
At the 29th Venice International Film Festival Teorema was nominated for the Golden Lion and Laura Betti won the Volpi Cup for Best Actress for her role in the film.

At the 1969 Nastro d'Argento awards the film was nominated for Best Director (Pasolini), Best Original Story (Pasolini) and Best Supporting Actress (Betti).

== Critical analysis ==
=== Structure and title etymology ===
Teorema means theorem in Italian. Its Greek root is theorema (θεώρημα), meaning simultaneously "spectacle", "intuition" and "theorem". Viano suggests that the film should be considered as "spectatorship" because each family member gazes at the guest and his loins, although this seems unlikely: the Greek word denotes the object of spectatorship rather than the actual act of spectatorship, which would be theoresis (θεώρησις).

As a term, theorem is also often considered as mathematical or formulaic. In this sense the film also contains a programmatic structure. It begins with documentary-like images and then moves on to the opening credit with a dark volcanic desert, a home party scene, cuts of the factory in sepia tone, introduction of each family member in silence and sepia tone and then the guest sitting in the back yard in colour. The middle section is divided into three: "seductions", "confessions" and "transformations".

Not only is the film's structure formulaic but so is the psychological development of each character. They all go through "seductions", "confessions" and "transformations". The way each character changes their state of mind is the same. They all fall into a sexual desire for the guest. They all have sex with him. When the guest leaves they all, except the maid, confess to him how they feel about themselves. In the final section of the film, after he leaves, they lose the identities they previously possessed. The maid goes back to her village and performs miracles while subsisting on nettles but asks to be buried alive. The daughter falls into a catatonic state. The son maniacally paints his desire for the guest. The mother picks up young men who resemble the guest and has sex with them. The father strips naked in the middle of the railway station.

=== Scholarly interpretations ===
A common interpretation by cinema scholars is that the film is a commentary on the bourgeois society and emergence of consumerism through the very beginning of the film. The reporter asks a worker at Paolo's factory if he thinks there will be no bourgeois in the future. In The Cinema of Economic Miracles: Visuality and Modernization in the Italian Art Film, Angelo Restivo assumes that Pasolini suggests that even documentary images, which depict facts, fail to show the truth. News can tell the audience only the surface of the events they broadcast. Merely watching the interview of the workers does not tell why factory owner Paolo gave away the factory. That might be one of the reasons the scene is set in the beginning of the film.

In his biographical work on Pasolini, Pasolini: A Biography, Enzo Siciliano assumes that Pasolini expresses his struggle of being homosexual in the film. On the other hand Viano believes that Pasolini's emphasis is not on homosexuality but rather on sexuality in general because the guest has sex with each member of the household. Sexuality is considered as passion in Viano's interpretation.

Italian critic Morandini, author of a dictionary of cinema, claimed that "the theorem is demonstrated: the incapacity of modern—bourgeois—man to perceive, listen to, absorb and live the sacred. Only Emilia the servant, who comes from a peasant family, discovers it and, after the 'miracle' of levitation, will return to the ground with a holy smell. It's another film by Pasolini dedicated to the conjunction between Marx and Freud (and, here, Jung and Marcuse too)."

== Other versions ==
The same year Pasolini expanded Teorema into a novel of the same name, written simultaneously with the film's production.

Giorgio Battistelli composed an opera based on the film.

In 2009 Dutch theatre company Toneelgroep Amsterdam created and performed a play version of the film.

== In popular culture ==
The sketch comedy programme Mr Show aired a segment (season three, episode six) in which a suburban family is slowly revealed, over time, to have all individually had sexual affairs with David Cross, possibly in reference to the film.

The 2024 Bruce LaBruce film The Visitor is a loose reworking of Teorema.

Teorema has been sometimes incorrectly cited as the source for the 1986 American comedy film Down and Out in Beverly Hills; though there are similar themes the latter is inspired by a French stage play (1919) made into film in 1932.

2024 Slovenian dark comedy film Family Therapy written and directed by Sonja Prosenc, a Slovene filmmaker, was inspired by Teorema.
