= Church of Saint Joseph (Ljubljana) =

Church in Ljubljana, Slovenia

- Cerkev sv. Jožefa
- Church of Saint Joseph
- 46.04888889°N 14.515°E
- Country: Slovenia
- Denomination: Roman Catholic
- Website: http://jezuiti-jozef.rkc.si/

History
- Dedication: Saint Joseph

Architecture
- Functional status: monastery church
- Architect: Anzelm Werner
- Architectural type: Neo-Roman

Administration
- Archdiocese: Ljubljana
- Deanery: Ljubljana - Moste
- Parish: Ljubljana - Sv. Peter

The Church of Saint Joseph (Slovene: Cerkev sv. Jožefa) is a Jesuit church in Ljubljana, Slovenia.

At 68.5 m, it is the longest church in the Ljubljana Archdiocese, has the largest dome and the second highest bell tower.

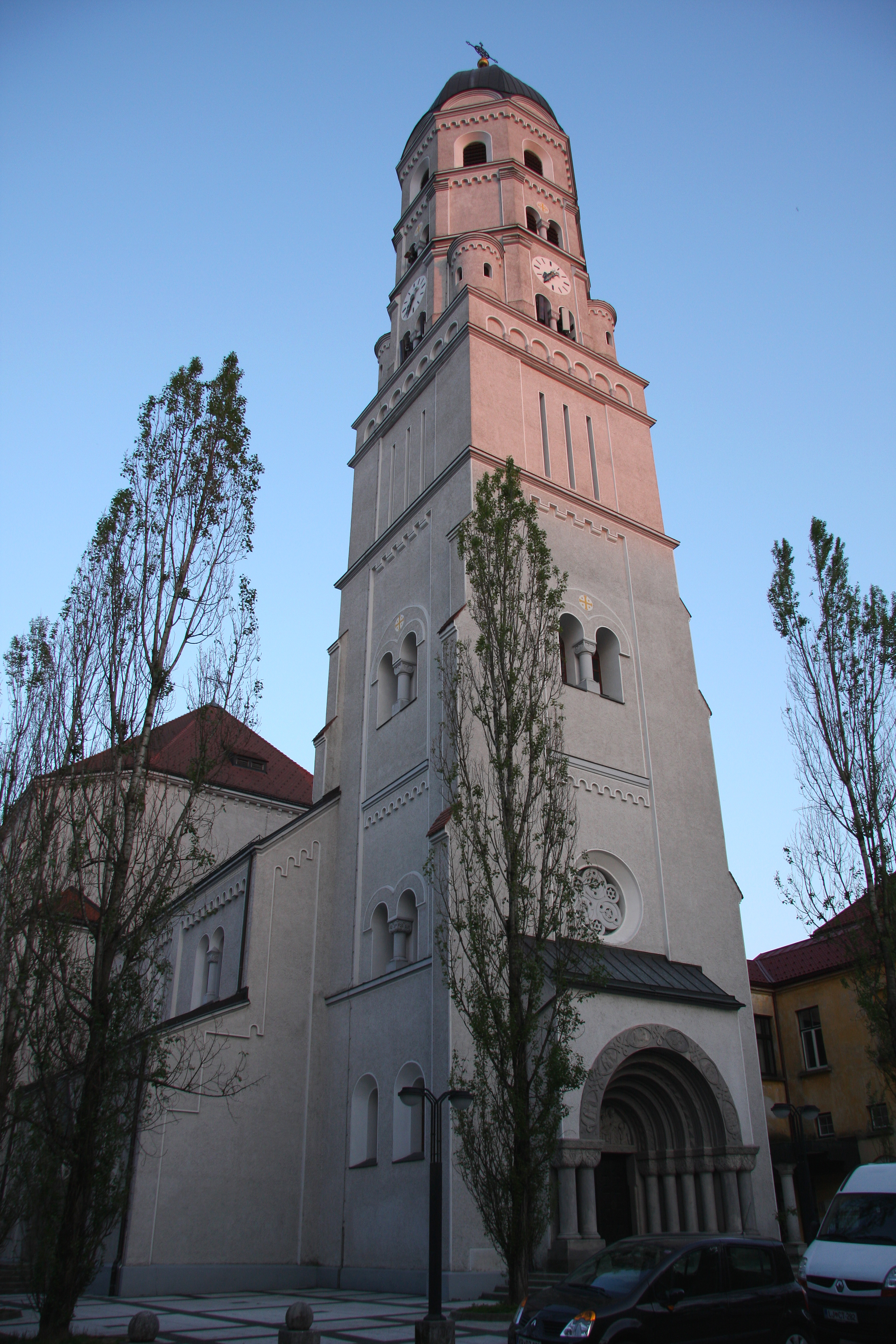
Entrance and bell tower

In 1941, the architect Jože Plečnik designed the main altar of St. Joseph. The statue for it was made by sculptor Božidar Pengov.

In 2006, a documentary film was made about the history of the church, Film pred altarjem, a work by Metod Pevec.
