= List of unions for film directing =

The following is a list of unions, guilds, or professional associations for film directors.

== Active ==
Name	Country or Region	Established	Membership
Australian Directors Guild	Australia	1981	900
Bangladesh Film Directors Association	Bangladesh	1981	
China Film Director's Guild	China	1993	300
Directors Guild of America	United States	1936	17500
Directors Guild of Canada	Canada	1962	4800
Directors Guild of Israel	Israel	1972	
Directors Guild of Japan	Japan	1936	550
Directors Guild of Nigeria	Nigeria	1999	
Directors Guild of Slovenia	Slovenia	2005	60
Directors UK	United Kingdom	2008	7000
Federation of European Film Directors (Fédération Européenne des Réalisateurs de l'Audiovisuel)	European Union	1980	
Film Artists' Association of Croatia	Croatia	1950	400
Film Directors Guild of Ghana	Ghana	2015	
German Directors Guild	Germany	1975	580+
Hong Kong Film Directors' Guild	Hong Kong	1989	
Indian Film & Television Directors’ Association	India	1959	10,000
L'ARP (La Société civile des Auteurs Réalisateurs et Producteurs)	France	1987	200
Philippine Motion Picture Directors Association	Philippines	1982	
Screen Directors Guild of Ireland	Ireland	2000	
Screen Directors Guild of New Zealand	New Zealand	1995	

== Disestablished ==
Name	Country or Region	Established	Disestablished	Replaced by
Directors Guild of Great Britain	Great Britain	1983	2013	Directors UK
Motion Picture Directors Association	United States	1915	1936	Directors Guild of America
Sarbufis	Indonesia	1951	1966	
