= Indian Film & Television Directors' Association =

Trade union in India

Coordinates: 19.140407°N 72.834634°E

- Founded: 1960; 66 years ago
- Headquarters: 8, 9 & 10, Crescent Tower, New Link Road; Andheri West, Mumbai - 400053
- Location: India
- Members: 3872 (as of 2012)
- Key people: Ashoke Pandit, President
- Affiliations: FWICE
- Website: www.directorsiftda.com

The Indian Film & Television Directors' Association (IFTDA) is an entertainment guild that represents the interests of film and television directors in India. It was founded as the Indian Film Directors' Association (IFDA) in 1960, before adopting today's name in 2007 and welcoming television directors into the guild. Ashoke Pandit is the current president, a role that has been held in the past by K.A. Abbas, Madhusudan, Basu Bhattacharya, Ramesh Saigal, Mahesh Kaul, and Mohan Segal.

Before IFDA was founded, it was known as the Assistant Directors' Association, and the decision to begin including directors led to its founding in 1960.

In 1969 IFDA began taking a stance against imports of foreign films, supporting a tax that would encourage films with smaller budgets and higher quality. In 1978, IFDA campaigned for more movie theatres to be built, working with state governments and National Film Development Corporation of India to open 100 new theatres.

IFTDA faced an identity crisis in 2010 when around 500 members quit in protest due to "lack of vision". In February 2019, IFTDA called for a hiring ban on all Pakistan artists working in Bollywood in response to the 2019 Pulwama attack and the subsequent remarks from Navjot Singh Sidhu.

== See also ==
- List of unions for film directing
