= Class Enemy (film) =

2013 film

- Film poster
- Directed by: Rok Biček
- Written by: Nejc Gazvoda; Rok Biček; Janez Lapajne
- Produced by: Aiken Veronika Prosenc; Janez Lapajne
- Cinematography: Fabio Stoll
- Edited by: Janez Lapajne; Rok Biček
- Production companies: Triglav film Slovenian Film Centre; Viba Film Studio
- Distributed by: Fivia; Paname Distribution; Trigon-film
- Release dates: 30 August 2013 (Venice); 12 September 2013 (Slovenia)
- Running time: 112 minutes
- Country: Slovenia
- Languages: Slovene; German

Class Enemy (Slovene: Razredni sovražnik) is a 2013 Slovenian drama film directed by Rok Biček. The film was selected as the Slovenian entry for the Best Foreign Language Film at the 86th Academy Awards, but it was not nominated. It was nominated for the 2014 Lux Prize. It won the Fedeora Award at the 28th Venice Critics' Week.

== Cast ==
- Igor Samobor as Robert
- Nataša Barbara Gračner as Zdenka
- Tjaša Železnik as Saša
- Maša Derganc as Nuša
- Robert Prebil as Matjaž
- Voranc Boh as Luka
- Jan Zupančič as Tadej
- Daša Cupevski as Sabina
- Doroteja Nadrah as Mojca
- Špela Novak as Špela
- Pia Korbar as Maruša
- Dan David Mrevlje Natlačen as Primož
- Jan Vrhovnik as Nik
- Kangjing Qiu as Chang
- Estera Dvornik as Sonja
- Peter Teichmeister as janitor

== Awards and accolades ==
Class Enemy was one of three films nominated for the European Parliament LUX Prize in 2014, and received the highest number of votes from audiences across Europe although the prize winner (chosen by a ballot of MEPs) was Ida.

The FEDEORA (Federation of Film Critics of Europe and the Mediterranean) jury awarded Class Enemy its prize for Best Film of the International Critics' Week at Venice in 2013.

At the Festival of Slovenian Film in September 2013, Class Enemy won seven Vesna awards: Best Film, Best Lead Actor (Igor Samobor), Best Supporting Actress (Barbara Gračner), Best Cinematography (Fabio Stoll), Best Costume Design ( Bistra Borak), the audience award, and the critics' award.

At the 2013 International Film Festival of Bratislava, Class Enemy won the Grand Prix, the Audience Award, the Award for Best Actor, and the FIPRESCI Prize.

It also won the FIPRESCI International Film Critics Prize at the Panorama of European Cinema in Athens in November 2013.

== See also ==
- List of submissions to the 86th Academy Awards for Best Foreign Language Film
- List of Slovenian submissions for the Academy Award for Best Foreign Language Film
