= List of submissions to the 84th Academy Awards for Best Foreign Language Film =

2011 Best Foreign Language Film submissions
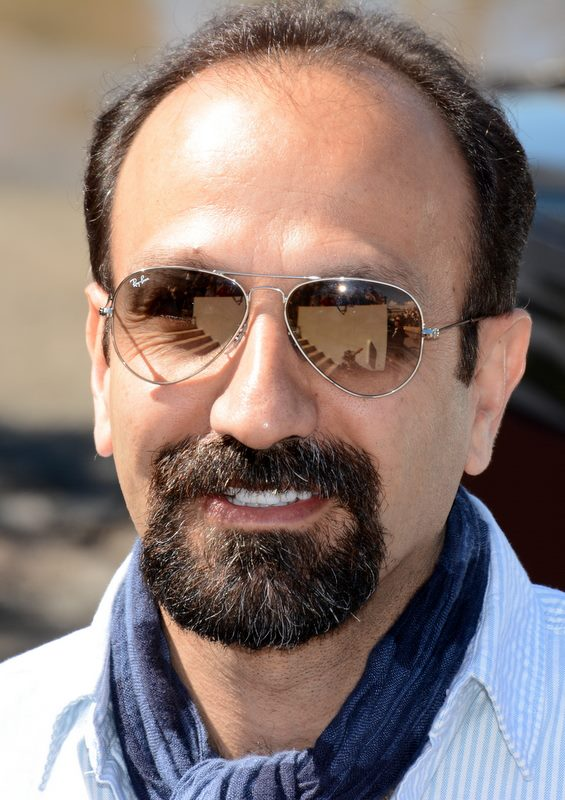
- Asghar Farhadi directed A Separation, which won the year's award.

Highlights
- Oscar winner: (Iran) A Separation
- Submissions: 65
- Debuts: 1
- Total eligible: 63

This is a list of submissions to the 84th Academy Awards for the Best Foreign Language Film. The Academy of Motion Picture Arts and Sciences (AMPAS) has invited the film industries of various countries to submit their best film for the Academy Award for Best Foreign Language Film every year since the award was created in 1956. The award is presented annually by the Academy to a feature-length motion picture produced outside the United States that contains primarily non-English dialogue. The Foreign Language Film Award Committee oversees the process and reviews all the submitted films.

For the 84th Academy Awards, the submitted motion pictures must have first been released theatrically in their respective countries between 1 October 2010 and 30 September 2011. The deadline for submissions to the Academy was 3 October 2011. 65 countries submitted films, and 63 were found to be eligible by AMPAS and screened for voters. New Zealand submitted a film for the first time. After the 9-film shortlist was announced on 18 January 2012, the five nominees were announced on 24 January 2012.

Iran won the award for the first time with A Separation by Asghar Farhadi, which was also nominated for Original Screenplay.

== Submissions ==
Submitting country	Film title used in nomination	Original title	Language(s)	Director(s)	Result
Albania	Amnesty	Amnistia	Albanian	Bujar Alimani	Not nominated
Argentina	Aballay	Aballay, el hombre sin miedo	Spanish	Fernando Spiner	Not nominated
Austria	Breathing	Atmen	Viennese German, German, English	Karl Markovics	Not nominated
Belgium	Bullhead	Rundskop	Truiens Limburgish, Dutch, French, West Flemish	Michaël R. Roskam	Nominated
Bosnia and Herzegovina	Belvedere		Bosnian	Ahmed Imamović	Not nominated
Brazil	Elite Squad: The Enemy Within	Tropa de Elite 2: O Inimigo Agora É Outro	Brazilian Portuguese	José Padilha	Not nominated
Bulgaria	Tilt	Тилт	Bulgarian, German	Victor Chuchkov	Not nominated
Canada	Monsieur Lazhar		French, English, Arabic	Philippe Falardeau	Nominated
Chile	Violeta Went to Heaven	Violeta se fue a los cielos	Spanish, French, Polish	Andrés Wood	Not nominated
China	The Flowers of War	金陵十三釵	Mandarin, Nanjingese, Shanghainese, Suzhounese, Cantonese, English, Japanese	Zhang Yimou	Not nominated
Colombia	The Colors of the Mountain	Los colores de la montaña	Spanish	Carlos César Arbeláez	Not nominated
Croatia	72 Days	Sedamdeset i dva dana	Croatian, Serbian	Danilo Šerbedžija	Not nominated
Cuba	Havanastation	Habanastation	Spanish	Ian Padrón	Not nominated
Czech Republic	Alois Nebel		Czech, Russian, German	Tomáš Luňák	Not nominated
Denmark	SuperClásico		Danish, Spanish, English	Ole Christian Madsen	Made shortlist
Dominican Republic	Love Child	La hija natural	Spanish	Leticia Tonos	Not nominated
Egypt	Lust	الشوق	Arabic	Khaled el-Hagar	Not nominated
Estonia	Letters to Angel	Kirjad Inglile	Estonian, Arabic, English	Sulev Keedus	Not nominated
Finland	Le Havre		French	Aki Kaurismäki	Not nominated
France	Declaration of War	La guerre est déclarée	French	Valérie Donzelli	Not nominated
Georgia	Chantrapas	შანტრაპა	Georgian, French, Russian	Otar Iosseliani	Not nominated
Germany	Pina	Pina – Tanzt, tanzt sonst sind wir verloren	German, English, French, Italian, Portuguese, Russian, Slovene, Korean, Spanish, Mandarin	Wim Wenders	Made shortlist
Greece	Attenberg		Greek, English, French	Athina Rachel Tsangari	Not nominated
Hong Kong	A Simple Life	桃姐	Cantonese, English, Mandarin	Ann Hui	Not nominated
Hungary	The Turin Horse	A Torinói ló	Hungarian, German	Béla Tarr	Not nominated
Iceland	Volcano	Eldfjall	Icelandic	Rúnar Rúnarsson	Not nominated
India	Abu, Son of Adam	ആദാമിന്റെ മകൻ അബു	Malayalam	Salim Ahamed	Not nominated
Indonesia	Under the Protection of Ka'Bah	Di Bawah Lindungan Ka'bah	Indonesian, Arabic, Minangkabau	Hanny Saputra	Not nominated
Iran	A Separation	جدایی نادر از سیمین	Persian	Asghar Farhadi	Won Academy Award
Ireland	As If I Am Not There	Као да ме нема	Bosnian, Croatian, Serbian, Swedish, English	Juanita Wilson	Not nominated
Israel	Footnote	הערת שוליים	Hebrew	Joseph Cedar	Nominated
Italy	Terraferma		Italian, Sicilian, Amharic	Emanuele Crialese	Not nominated
Japan	Postcard	一枚のハガキ	Japanese	Kaneto Shindō	Not nominated
Kazakhstan	Returning to the 'A'	Возвращение в «А» / А-ға оралу	Russian, Kazakh, Persian	Egor Konchalovsky	Not nominated
Lebanon	Where Do We Go Now?	وهلّأ لوين؟ / Et maintenant, on va où	Arabic, English, Russian	Nadine Labaki	Not nominated
Lithuania	Back to Your Arms	Kai apkabinsiu tave	Lithuanian, Russian, German, English	Kristijonas Vildžiūnas	Not nominated
(North Macedonia) Macedonia	Punk's Not Dead	Панкот не е мртов	Macedonian, Albanian, Bosnian, Croatian	Vladimir Blaževski	Not nominated
Mexico	Miss Bala		Spanish, English	Gerardo Naranjo	Not nominated
Morocco	Omar Killed Me	Omar m'a tuer	French, Arabic	Roschdy Zem	Made shortlist
Netherlands	Sonny Boy		Dutch, German, English	Maria Peters	Not nominated
New Zealand	The Orator	O le Tulāfale	Samoan	Tusi Tamasese	Not nominated
Norway	Happy, Happy	Sykt lykkelig	Norwegian, Danish, German	Anne Sewitsky	Not nominated
Peru	October	Octubre	Spanish	Daniel and Diego Vega Vidal	Not nominated
Philippines	The Woman in the Septic Tank	Ang Babae Sa Septic Tank	Filipino, English	Marlon Rivera	Not nominated
Poland	In Darkness	W ciemności	Polish, German, Yiddish, Ukrainian, Russian, Hebrew, Bałak	Agnieszka Holland	Nominated
Portugal	José and Pilar	José e Pilar	Portuguese, Spanish	Miguel Gonçalves Mendes	Not nominated
Puerto Rico	America		Spanish	Sonia Fritz	Disqualified
Romania	Morgen		Romanian, Hungarian, Turkish	Marian Crișan	Not nominated
Russia	Burnt by the Sun 2: Exodus	Утомлённые солнцем 2: Цитадель	Russian, German	Nikita Mikhalkov	Not nominated
Serbia	Montevideo, God Bless You!	Монтевидео, Бог те видео	Serbian, Bulgarian, French	Dragan Bjelogrlić	Not nominated
Singapore	Tatsumi	辰巳	Japanese	Eric Khoo	Not nominated
Slovakia	Gypsy	Cigán	Carpathian Romani, Slovak	Martin Šulík	Not nominated
Slovenia	Silent Sonata	Circus Fantasticus	No dialogue	Janez Burger	Disqualified
South Africa	Beauty	Skoonheid	Afrikaans, English	Oliver Hermanus	Not nominated
South Korea	The Front Line	고지전	Korean, English	Jang Hoon	Not nominated
Spain	Black Bread	Pa negre	Catalan, Spanish	Agustí Villaronga	Not nominated
Sweden	Beyond	Svinalängorna	Swedish, Finnish	Pernilla August	Not nominated
Switzerland	Summer Games	Giochi d'estate	Italian, French	Rolando Colla	Not nominated
Taiwan	Warriors of the Rainbow	Seediq Bale / 賽德克·巴萊	Seediq, Japanese, Taiwanese Hokkien, Mandarin	Wei Te-sheng	Made shortlist
Thailand	Kon Khon	คนโขน	Thai	Sarunyu Wongkrachang	Not nominated
Turkey	Once Upon a Time in Anatolia	Bir Zamanlar Anadolu’da	Turkish	Nuri Bilge Ceylan	Not nominated
United Kingdom	Patagonia		Welsh, Patagonian Welsh, Spanish, English, Polish	Marc Evans	Not nominated
Uruguay	The Silent House	La casa muda	Spanish	Gustavo Hernández	Not nominated
Venezuela	The Rumble of the Stones	El rumor de las piedras	Spanish	Alejandro Bellame Palacios	Not nominated
Vietnam	The Prince and the Pagoda Boy	Khát vọng Thăng Long	Vietnamese	Lưu Trọng Ninh	Not nominated

== Notes ==
- Albania originally submitted The Forgiveness of Blood by Joshua Marston, but it was rejected due to protest of Bujar Alimani, the director of Amnesty. He argued that The Forgiveness of Blood shouldn't be eligible to represent Albania due to its American director and key American crew members. AMPAS disqualified it and Albania instead submitted Alimani's film.
- The Dominican Republic submitted Love Child by Leticia Tonos. It was initially rejected because of the country's failure to submit the names of its selection committee members on time, but they appealed and won.
- Latvia initially selected Return of Sergeant Lapins by Gatis Šmits, but it was not submitted due to technical reasons.
- Luxembourg announced that they had no eligible films, and would not be participating in the competition this year.
- Puerto Rico, which had been invited to participate in the Foreign Oscar race since 1986, originally submitted America by Sonia Fritz, but was rejected because of a new rule that doesn't allow films from US territories to compete in the Foreign Language Film category. The Puerto Rico Film Commission, which selects the Puerto Rican Oscar nominee, appealed to AMPAS to change its mind, citing its previous Oscar nomination in the category and the presence of non-independent territories like Greenland, Hong Kong and Palestine, but AMPAS refused to change its mind.
- Slovenia originally submitted Silent Sonata by Janez Burger, but was disqualified because the Society of Slovene Filmmakers neglected to officially submit the entry in time because of a misunderstanding within the organization. Therefore, it wasn't included in the final list of entries.
- Ukraine announced that they had convened an Oscar selection committee, but decided that no Ukrainian film met all the AMPAS requirements, meaning that they did not submit a film for the third year in a row.
