= Safe Place (film) =

2022 film by Juraj Lerotić

- Croatian: Sigurno mjesto
- Directed by: Juraj Lerotić
- Screenplay by: Juraj Lerotić
- Starring: Juraj Lerotić; Goran Marković; Snježana Sinovčić Šiškov
- Cinematography: Marko Brdar
- Edited by: Marko Ferković
- Production companies: Pipser; Zelena Zraka
- Release date: 6 August 2022 (Locarno)
- Running time: 102 minutes
- Countries: Croatia; Slovenia
- Language: Croatian

Safe Place (Croatian: Sigurno mjesto) is a 2022 Croatian family drama film written and directed by Juraj Lerotić as his debut. The film stars Juraj Lerotić as Bruno, Goran Marković as Damir and Snježana Sinovčić Šiškov as Mother.

Safe Place had its world premiere at the 75th Locarno Film Festival on 6 August 2022, as a part of 'Concorso Cineasti del presente' program and won three prizes: Juraj Lerotić Award for Best Emerging Director Award of the City and Region of Locarno Goran Marković Award for Best Actor (Pardo for Best Actor), Best Debut Feature Film (Swatch First Feature Award).

Safe Place was selected by the Croatian Society of Film Professionals as the Croatian candidate for the Best International Feature Film category at the 95th Academy Awards in September 2022. Juraj Lerotić won The "Vladimir Nazor Award'' by the Republic of Croatia for outstanding artistic achievements in film. The European Film Academy Board has selected the film for a European Film Award nomination.

== Plot ==
Safe Place follows the two brothers and their mother (character actress Snježana Sinovičić Šiškov), who comes into the picture over the course of the next 24 hours. During that period of time, Bruno and the mother have to protect Damir not just from himself, but also from the unsympathetic system consisting of rude and suspicious members of the police and the robotic, sometimes even arrogant medical personnel. The safe place they want to reach in every sense of the word proves to be quite elusive.

== Production ==
The film received financial support from the Croatian Audiovisual Centre, the Croatian Radiotelevision and the Slovenian Film Centre. In addition, the film won the Eurimages Development Award at the CineLink Co-production Market of the Sarajevo Film Festival. Safe Place is produced by a Zagreb based production company Pipser, with Miljenka Čogelja as producer and Zelena zraka (Saša Ban and Nevenka Sablić) as the Croatian co-production partner. The film was created in collaboration with Slovenian production December (Vlado Bulajić i Lija Pogačnik).

== Release ==
"The film was nationally distributed and sold in the seven territories so far:

- Serbia - released in February 2023,
- Montenegro: released February 2023,
- Slovenia: release - September 2023,
- Turkey: release - September 2023,
- Taiwan: release - October 2023,
- The Netherlands: release - summer 2023,
- Portugal: late December 2023/early January 2024

VOD Safe Place is screened at HBO (covering the following territories: Albania, Czech Republic, Slovak Republic, Hungary, Poland, Romania, Moldova, Croatia, Slovenia, Serbia, Kosovo, Montenegro, Bosnia and Herzegovina, North Macedonia, Bulgaria - Payv TV & SVOD) from the 1st of June 2023, it is also available in Spain via Filmin as well as Australia via SBS on demand."

== Critical response and awards ==
Both Croatian and foreign critics, professionals, public figures, and audiences wrote about the film.

Many international critics have called Lerotić's debut the film of the year, including Byron Burton, a journalist for The Hollywood Reporter and editor of the blog Award Focus. Guy Lodge of Variety, Carmen Gray of The Guardian and a Berlinale selector, and John Bleasdale, a blogger and critic for The Times, also included Safe Place among the top ten films of 2022 global production. Safe Place was also listed among the best films of 2022 by Sight and Sound, a British magazine published by the British Film Institute and appeared on the numerous top lists of the best films of 2022 by Croatian critics, such as the Top List of Films in 2022 - Croatian Critics. In addition, Safe Place was selected among the top 10 film favorites of 2022 on the Festival Scope streaming platform for film professionals. After a screening at the Locarno Film Festival, the selectors stated that Safe Place was undoubtedly one of the most successful and best-chosen films of the year at the festival.

Safe Place was the winner at the 2022 Sarajevo Film Festival, winning the Heart of Sarajevo prize for best feature film as well as Heart of Sarajevo for best male role to Juraj Lerotić; CICAE Award given by the International Confederation of Art Cinemas for best film in the feature film category; Best Actor at the Euro-Balkan Film Festival; Cineuropa Award by the portal of the same name dedicated to European cinema and its creators. The film has been screened at 70 world festivals and won a total of 48 awards at various European and World film festivals. Of particular note is its screening at the prestigious New Directors/New Films festival in April 2023, at the Museum of Modern Art (MoMA) and the Lincoln Center for the Performing Arts in New York.
