= Houston, We Have a Problem! (film) =

2016 film

- Film poster
- Directed by: Žiga Virc
- Written by: Žiga Virc
- Screenplay by: Boštjan Virc; Žiga Virc
- Produced by: Boštjan Virc
- Cinematography: Andrej Virc
- Edited by: Vladimir Gojun
- Release dates: 16 April 2016 (Tribeca); 25 April 2016 (Slovenia)
- Running time: 98 minutes
- Countries: Slovenia; Croatia; Germany; Czech Republic; Qatar
- Languages: Slovene; Serbian; Croatian; Bosnian; English

Houston, We Have a Problem! (Slovene: Houston, imamo problem!) is a 2016 internationally co-produced docufiction-mockumentary film by Slovenian director Žiga Virc. The film explores the myth of the secret multibillion-dollar deal behind the United States' purchase of Yugoslavia's clandestine space program in the early 1960s. It is based and inspired by numerous real events and facts, in the sense that it is intended as an allegory to the Cold War.

The film premiered on 16 April 2016 at Tribeca Film Festival. It was selected as the Slovenian entry for the Best Foreign Language Film at the 89th Academy Awards but it was not nominated.

== Plot ==
Yugoslavia develops a space program, as a forgotten third player in the Space Race beside the United States and the Soviet Union, which Josip Broz Tito then sells to the John F. Kennedy administration in the U.S. in return for $2.5 billion (a value of about $50 billion in 2016, the year the film was released) in "overseas aid" which boosts Yugoslavia's economy. When the imported technology fails to deliver its promised results for NASA's planned Moon landing, an angry U.S. applies pressure to Tito, including financial blackmail and threats of military action, culminating in a secret CIA plot that triggers the bloody breakup of Yugoslavia.

== Production ==
It is international co-production by Studio Virc (Slovenia), Nukleus Film (Croatia) and Sutor Kolonko (Germany), backed by HBO Europe, Westdeutscher Rundfunk, Radiotelevizija Slovenija and the Doha Film Institute. It is subsidized by Slovenian Film Centre, the Croatian Audiovisual Centre, Viba Film Studio, MEDIA Creative Europe, Eurimages and the Doha Film Institute. It's HBOs first co-production in the Adriatic region.

According to the director Žiga Virc, the intention of the film was to "tell the symbolic story of the rise and fall of Yugoslavia", as well inviting the viewer to decide what is real and what fiction. In the film are mixed real archive footage with artful fabrication, and conspiracy theory about the Yugoslav space program. Although the film has many comic and emotional subplots, like the pig that served as the first test pilot, or the elderly engineer Ivan Pavić, one of twenty six Yugoslav engineers, who was forced to leave his young family, fake his death and funeral, for the undercovered move and work for NASA, and his later return to Croatia, confession and meeting with grown up daughter, they are all fictional. However, many details are real, like the underground military air base Objekat 505, Tito's visit to New York in 1963, during which he survived a failed assassination attempt, the scratchy recording of phone call between Tito and Kennedy, the recording by Richard Nixon (in a quote about Vietnam, "We'll bomb those Yugoslav bastards right out of the—off the earth. I really mean it.", Yugoslavia is carefully added) and many others.

The film producer and co-writer Boštjan Virc noted that they are aware "not everyone will understand the nature of the film". The point is the power of deception - the people believed a small production film with a hint, while on the other hand big news productions, companies, governments have no hints that something is wrong in the picture, and people take it for granted. He worriedly concluded that "seeing is believing" even if it is a complete fake.

The myth became popular in January 2012 when the filmmakers Žiga and Boštjan uploaded a short video clip on YouTube, which received in excess of one million views, as well as extensive media attention including by Smithsonian Institution. Most of the viewers believed in what they saw in the video, and in the same year internet survey by Radio Free Europe/Radio Liberty, 41.8% of the respondents of the online poll voted that they believe that Yugoslavia sold the program to US.

=== Yugoslav space program ===
The myth is based on several facts: the work The Problem of Space Travel by Herman Potočnik (1892–1929) influenced German, American and Soviet scientists, but it is speculated that U.S. agents confiscated his surviving unpublished notes. In the early 1960s the financial support from the U.S. was larger than NASA's annual budgets, and after Dwight D. Eisenhower the policy was continued by Kennedy. Tito was the last foreign statesman to visit Kennedy before his death, and reasons for the U.S. financial support are not understood to this day.

There existed scientific cooperation between the United States and Yugoslavia, including the Yugoslav visits by the crews of Apollo 8, 9 and 11. On 26 September 1967, in Belgrade was held the first-ever international symposium on space exploration "First Steps Toward Space", while the second in New York. On 27 June 1971, in Belgrade was held an exhibition on space technologies, which brought together American and Soviet specialists, and fostered future cooperation.

Many Yugoslav engineers were employed by NASA, including Mike (Milojko) Vucelić who worked on Apollo 11 and 13 and Anton Mavretič. The crew of Apollo 11 carried with it the flags of 135 countries including Yugoslavia during the Moon landing on 20 July 1969. The Yugoslavian lunar sample display is now held at the Museum of Yugoslav History in Belgrade.

== Reception ==
=== Critical response ===
Stephen Dalton from The Hollywood Reporter described the film as "consistently witty and entertaining, even when testing the limits of audience gullibility... ultimately less a film about Cold War politics than a sly commentary on our current climate of internet myth-making and 'post-truth' public figures", and that philosopher Slavoj Žižek has a chorus role which warns that comforting fiction is often more appealing than complex fact, "even if it didn’t happen, it’s true. That’s the crucial message".

Steve Pond from TheWrap described it as "very entertaining, even if it’s about as factual as This Is Spinal Tap". He noted that the film "acts like a doc but works as myth, not fact; director Ziga Virc doesn’t want audiences to believe what he’s telling them so much as he wants them to think about why they’re so ready to accept any kind of tomfoolery and conspiracy the media puts in front of them".

P. Stuart Robinson from Montages Magazine saw in the film structure parallels with Searching for Sugar Man, and described it as "a minor masterpiece of plausible fabrication, tracking real events with an unwavering satirical eye, and placing them in a kind of perspective that is at once ridiculous and yet surprisingly illuminating. Above all, it’s a good story in its own terms, a real cinematic page-turner".

Noah Charney from the New York Observer paralleled it with "Dr. Strangelove, part F for Fake, part real and part Spinal Tap", and praised it as a clever film. He quotes Slovenian film critic Marcel Stefancic Jr.'s interpretation that the film mocks both Yugo-nostalgia and the idea that socialism cannot work unless it is secretly funded by capitalism. However, in Charney's opinion, even intelligent viewers from former Yugoslavia, let alone from the U.S., may have a problem understanding it.

Jessica Kiang and Nick Schager from Variety and The Village Voice criticized that the "little fun ... depends on falling for its far-fetched premise", and "there are surely more compelling ways to offer it than via a one-note, 88-minute-long joke".

=== Awards ===
- Slovenian Film Festival - best feature film; best editing (Vladimir Gojun); best actor (Božidar Smiljanić as Ivan Pavić)
- Mediteran Film Festival - audience award
- Karlovy Vary International Film Festival - East of West Award nomination for Žiga Virc

== See also ==
- List of Slovenian submissions for the Academy Award for Best Foreign Language Film
- List of submissions to the 89th Academy Awards for Best Foreign Language Film
