= Idle Running =

- Directed by: Janez Burger
- Starring: Jan Cvitkovič; Nataša Burger
- Release date: 6 July 1999 (KVFF)
- Running time: 1h 30min
- Country: Slovenia
- Language: Slovenian

Idle Running (Slovene: V leru) is a 1999 Slovene comedy film directed by Janez Burger.
