= Silent Sonata =

2011 film

- Directed by: Janez Burger
- Written by: Janez Burger
- Produced by: Jožko Rutar; Morgan Bushe
- Starring: Leon Lučev
- Cinematography: Divis Marek
- Release dates: 25 January 2011 (Rotterdam); 8 February 2011 (Slovenia)
- Running time: 75 minutes
- Country: Slovenia
- Language: None

Silent Sonata (Slovene: Circus Fantasticus) is a 2011 Slovenian war drama film directed by Janez Burger and has no dialogue. The main producers are the Slovene Stara Gara and the Irish Fastnet Films. Silent Sonata is the first official Slovene-Irish-Swedish-Finnish co-production and was shot in 35 days in Slovenia and Ireland. The world premiere took place on the International Film Festival Rotterdam in 2011. The production crew included members from at least 18 countries. The film's original title was Circus Fantasticus, but only in Slovenia, as it is distributed under its original title.

The film was selected as the Slovenian entry for the Best Foreign Language Film at the 84th Academy Awards, however, the Society of Slovene filmmakers (Društvo slovenskih filmskih ustvarjalcev, DSFU) neglected to officially submit the entry in time because of a misunderstanding within the organization, so it wasn't included in the final list of entries.

== Cast ==
- Leon Lučev as Father
- Ravil Sultanov as Circus Leader
- Pauliina Räsänen as Beauty
- René Bazinet as Old Man
- Daniel Rovai as Clown
- Enej Grom as Boy
- Luna Mijović as Daughter
- David Boelee as Fire Blower
- Marjuta Slamič as Dead Wife
- Devi Bragalini as Son
- Nataša Sultanova as Female Clown
- Slava Volkov as Muscle Man

== Awards ==
- 13th Festival of Slovenian Film Portorož
  - Vesna Award for Best Feature Film
  - Vesna Award for Best Director
  - Vesna Award for Best Supporting Actor
  - Vesna Award for Best Music
  - Vesna Award for Best Sound
  - Vesna Award for Best Make-up
  - Award of Slovenian film critics for Best Feature Film
  - Kodak Award for Best Photography
- 58th Pula Film Festival
  - Best Actors Award - Awarded to the entire cast
- Alexandria International Film Festival
  - Best Artistic Achievement Award

== See also ==
- List of Slovenian films
- List of submissions to the 84th Academy Awards for Best Foreign Language Film
- List of Slovenian submissions for the Academy Award for Best Foreign Language Film
