= The Tree (2014 film) =

2014 film

- Film poster
- Directed by: Sonja Prosenc
- Written by: Sonja Prosenc
- Starring: Katarina Stegnar
- Release date: 7 July 2014 (Karlovy)
- Running time: 90 minutes
- Country: Slovenia
- Language: Slovene

The Tree (Slovene: Drevo) is a 2014 Slovenian drama film written and directed by Sonja Prosenc. It film was selected as the Slovenian entry for the Best Foreign Language Film at the 88th Academy Awards but it was not nominated.

== Cast ==
- Katarina Stegnar
- Jernej Kogovsek
- Lukas Matija Rosas Ursic

== See also ==
- List of submissions to the 88th Academy Awards for Best Foreign Language Film
- List of Slovenian submissions for the Academy Award for Best Foreign Language Film
