= Ivan (2017 film) =

2017 film

- Film poster
- Directed by: Janez Burger
- Written by: Janez Burger
- Starring: Maruša Majer
- Release date: 13 September 2017
- Running time: 91 minutes
- Country: Slovenia
- Languages: Slovenian; Italian

Ivan is a 2017 Slovenian drama film directed by Janez Burger. It was selected as the Slovenian entry for the Best Foreign Language Film at the 91st Academy Awards, but it was not nominated.

== Cast ==
- Maruša Majer as Mara
- Matjaž Tribušon as Rok
- Nataša Barbara Gračner as the social worker

== Financing and production ==
The project is estimated at 1,478,500 euros. It was supported by the Slovenian Film Center (€575,000), RTV Slovenia (€195,800), the Croatian Audiovisual Center (€755,870 or approx. €99,358) and Eurimages (€167,426). Technical services were provided by FS Viba film (€191,350).

== See also ==
- List of submissions to the 91st Academy Awards for Best Foreign Language Film
- List of Slovenian submissions for the Academy Award for Best Foreign Language Film
