= Ruins (film) =

2004 film

- Directed by: Janez Burger
- Written by: Janez Burger
- Starring: Darko Rundek
- Release date: November 2004
- Running time: 99 minutes
- Country: Slovenia
- Language: Slovene

Ruins (Slovene: Ruševine) is a 2004 Slovenian drama film directed by Janez Burger. It was selected as the Slovenian entry for the Best Foreign Language Film at the 78th Academy Awards, but it was not nominated.

== Cast ==
- Darko Rundek as Herman
- Nataša Matjašec as Žana
- Matjaž Tribušon as Gregor
- Milan Štefe as Vojko
- Vesna Jevnikar as Marjana

== See also ==
- List of submissions to the 78th Academy Awards for Best Foreign Language Film
- List of Slovenian submissions for the Academy Award for Best International Feature Film
