= The Miner (film) =

2017 film

- Film poster
- Directed by: Hanna Slak
- Written by: Hanna Antonina Wojcik Slak
- Produced by: Sinisa Juricic; Miha Knific
- Starring: Boris Cavazza
- Cinematography: Matthias Pilz
- Edited by: Vladimir Gojun
- Music by: Amélie Legrand; Damir Imamovic
- Distributed by: 2i Film
- Release date: 15 September 2017
- Running time: 98 minutes
- Country: Slovenia
- Language: Slovene
- Box office: $10,252 (Slovenia)

The Miner (Slovene: Rudar) is a 2017 Slovenian drama film directed by Hanna Slak. It was selected as the Slovenian entry for the Best Foreign Language Film at the 90th Academy Awards, but it was not nominated. This film follows the true story of a miner, who discovers thousands of executed people in Barbara Pit massacre.

== Plot ==
Alija discovers thousands of bodies of people executed during World War II in an abandoned mine. His employer, wanting to sell the mine, pressures him to keep quiet, but he risks his job by alerting police.

== Cast ==
- Boris Cavazza
- Jure Henigman
- Leon Lučev
- Tin Marn
- Marina Redzepovic

== See also ==
- List of submissions to the 90th Academy Awards for Best Foreign Language Film
- List of Slovenian submissions for the Academy Award for Best Foreign Language Film
