= Sanremo (film) =

2020 film

- Directed by: Miroslav Mandić
- Written by: Miroslav Mandić; Nina Robnik
- Produced by: Miroslav Mandić
- Starring: Sandi Pavlin; Silva Cusin
- Cinematography: Peter Zeitlinger
- Edited by: Andrej Nagode
- Music by: Darko Rundek
- Release date: 21 November 2020 (2020 Tallinn Black Nights Film Festival)
- Running time: 85 minutes
- Country: Slovenia
- Language: Slovenian

Sanremo is a 2020 Slovenian drama film directed by Miroslav Mandić. It premiered at the 2020 Tallinn Black Nights Film Festival in November 2020 and was selected as the Slovenian entry for the Best International Feature Film at the 94th Academy Awards.

== Synopsis ==
Nursing home residents Bruno and Duša, both suffering from dementia, form a fragile bond.

== Cast ==
- Sandi Pavlin as Bruno
- Silva Cusin as Duša
- Boris Cavazza as Dare
- Doroteja Nadrah as Jana
- Mojca Funkl as Spela

== See also ==
- List of submissions to the 94th Academy Awards for Best International Feature Film
- List of Slovenian submissions for the Academy Award for Best International Feature Film
