= A Trip =

2011 film

- Film poster
- Directed by: Nejc Gazvoda
- Written by: Nejc Gazvoda
- Starring: Luka Cimpric
- Cinematography: Marko Brdar
- Release dates: 4 October 2011 (Germany); 19 January 2012 (Slovenia)
- Running time: 81 minutes
- Country: Slovenia
- Language: Slovene

A Trip (Slovene: Izlet) is a 2011 Slovenian drama film directed by Nejc Gazvoda. The film was selected as the Slovenian entry for the Best Foreign Language Oscar at the 85th Academy Awards, but it did not make the final shortlist.

== Cast ==
- Luka Cimpric as Andrej
- Jure Henigman as Gregor
- Nina Rakovec as Ziva

== See also ==
- List of submissions to the 85th Academy Awards for Best Foreign Language Film
- List of Slovenian submissions for the Academy Award for Best Foreign Language Film
