= Camera obscura (Gazvoda novel) =

2006 novel by Nejc Gazvoda

- Author: Nejc Gazvoda
- Language: Slovenian
- Publication date: 2006
- Publication place: Slovenia

Camera obscura is a novel by Slovenian author Nejc Gazvoda, first published in 2006. It was nominated for, but did not win, the Kresnik Award in the year of its publication.

== See also ==
- List of Slovenian novels
