= Little Trouble Girls =

2025 Slovenian drama film

- International promotional poster
- Slovene: Kaj ti je deklica
- Literally: What's wrong, girl?
- Directed by: Urška Djukić
- Written by: Urška Djukić; Maria Bohr
- Produced by: Jožko Rutar; Miha Černec
- Starring: Jara Sofija Ostan; Mina Švajger; Saša Tabaković; Nataša Burger; Staša Popović; Mateja Strle
- Cinematography: Lev Predan Kowarski
- Edited by: Vlado Gojun
- Production companies: SPOK Films; Staragara; 365 Films; Non-Aligned Films; Nosorogi; OINK
- Release date: 14 February 2025 (Berlinale)
- Running time: 90 minutes
- Countries: Slovenia; Italy; Croatia; Serbia
- Language: Slovene
- Box office: $63,917

Little Trouble Girls (Slovene: Kaj ti je deklica, lit. 'What's up, girl') is a 2025 drama film directed by Urška Djukić, who co-wrote it with Maria Bohr. It follows introverted 16-year-old Lucija and her relationship with fellow student Ana-Marija.

The film had its world premiere at the Perspectives section of the 75th Berlin International Film Festival on 14 February 2025, where it was nominated for the Teddy Award and competed for the Best Feature Film Award. It was also selected as the Slovenian entry for the Best International Feature Film at the 98th Academy Awards, but it was not nominated.

== Synopsis ==
Sixteen-year-old Lucija, a shy student at a Catholic school, joins the all-girls choir and befriends the charismatic Ana-Marija. During a retreat at a countryside convent, Lucija's attraction to a restoration worker creates tension with Ana-Marija and the choir. As she navigates her emerging sexuality, she begins to question her beliefs, causing conflict within the group.

== Cast ==
- Jara Sofija Ostan as Lucija
- Mina Švajger as Ana Maria
- Saša Tabaković as Conductor
- Nataša Burger as Mother
- Staša Popović as Klara
- Mateja Strle as Uršula

== Production ==
The Slovenia-Italy-Croatia-Serbia co-production is directed by Urška Djukić, co-written with Maria Bohr. It is produced by Jožko Rutar for SPOK Films, Miha Černec and David Cej for Staragara, and Katarina Prpić for Izazov 365. Co-producers include Radiotelevizija Slovenija, as well as Marina Gumzi for Nosorogi. The production is supported by the Slovenian Film Centre, Radiotelevizija Slovenija, the Italian Ministry of Culture’s Film Directorate, the Friuli-Venezia-Giulia Film Commission, Eurimages and the Croatian Audiovisual Centre. Principal photography commenced on 20 June 2023 in Cividale del Friuli in Italy with additional shooting in Ljubljana in Slovenia.

French company Sister Productions was associate producer on the film.

== Release ==
Little Trouble Girls had its world premiere on 14 February 2025, as part of the 75th Berlin International Film Festival, in Perspectives. The film competed in the International Narrative Competition section of the 24th Tribeca Film Festival and was screened on 5 June 2025. It was also part of Horizons section of the 59th Karlovy Vary International Film Festival, where it was screened from 5 July to 11 July 2025. In August it was showcased at the 31st Sarajevo Film Festival in 'In Focus' section. On 2 October 2025, it was presented in Vanguard section of 2025 Vancouver International Film Festival. It also made it to the 'Meeting Point' slate of the 70th Valladolid International Film Festival.

The film was screened in the International Panorama for its Quebec Premiere at the 2025 Festival du nouveau cinéma on 11 October 2025. It was screened in the Open Horizons at the Thessaloniki International Film Festival on 31 October 2025. It was also screened in Discovery section of the 2025 Stockholm International Film Festival on 7 November 2025. On 8 November 2025, it was presented in Visions of the East section of Arras Film Festival. It competed in the International competition section of the 56th International Film Festival of India in November 2025. The film competed in the Awards Buzz – Best International Feature Film section of the 37th Palm Springs International Film Festival on 4 January 2026. In January 2026, it will be presented in the Wild Roses section of the Trieste Film Festival, the section dedicated to the women directors of Central and Eastern Europe. Athens-based sales agent Heretic has acquired the international sales rights of the film in January 2025.

== Reception ==
On the review aggregator website Rotten Tomatoes, 98% of 46 critics' reviews are positive. The website's consensus reads: "Harmonizing themes of sexual awakening and spirituality into a wholly authentic and revelatory coming-of-age drama, Little Trouble Girls is an arresting feature debut from writer-director Urška Djukić."

Writing in The Guardian, Peter Bradshaw gave Little Trouble Girls five stars out of five, calling it "an utterly absorbing and outstandingly acted film."

== Accolades ==
The film was selected in the newly formed Perspectives competition and competed for GWFF Best First Feature Award.

Award	Date of ceremony	Category	Recipient	Result	Ref.
Les Arcs Film Festival	18 December 2023	TitraFilm award	Little Trouble Girls	Won	
Berlin International Film Festival	23 February 2025	GWFF Best First Feature Award	Little Trouble Girls	Nominated	
Berlin International Film Festival	23 February 2025	Teddy Award for Best Short Films	Little Trouble Girls	Nominated	
Berlin International Film Festival	23 February 2025	FIPRESCI Prize	Little Trouble Girls	Won	
Tribeca Film Festival	12 June 2025	Best Cinematography	Lev Predan Kowarski	Won	
CinEast Film Festival	26 October 2025	Critics’ Prize	Little Trouble Girls	Won	
Festival of Slovenian Film	26 October 2025	Best Feature Film	Little Trouble Girls	Won	
Festival of Slovenian Film	26 October 2025	Best Actress	Jara Sofija Ostan	Won	
Festival of Slovenian Film	26 October 2025	Best Supporting Actress	Mina Švajger	Won	
Festival of Slovenian Film	26 October 2025	Best Sound Design	Julij Zornik	Won	
Festival of Slovenian Film	26 October 2025	Best Supporting Actor	Saša Tabaković	Won	
Festival of Slovenian Film	26 October 2025	FIPRESCI Award	Urška Djukić	Won	
Euro-Balkan Film Festival	6 November 2025	Youth Jury Prizes - Feature Films: Best Director	Urška Djukić	Won	
International Film Festival of India	28 November 2025	Golden Peacock	Little Trouble Girls	Nominated	
Les Arcs Film Festival	20 December 2025	Jury Grand Prize	Little Trouble Girls	Won	
European Film Awards	17 January 2026	European Discovery – Prix FIPRESCI	Little Trouble Girls	Nominated	
Tromsø International Film Festival	25 January 2026	Faith in Film Award	Little Trouble Girls	Won	

== See also ==
- List of submissions to the 98th Academy Awards for Best International Feature Film
- List of Slovenian submissions for the Academy Award for Best International Feature Film
