= Slovenska Vas, Šentrupert =

Slovenska Vas
- Location in Slovenia
- Coordinates: 45°57′10.77″N 15°5′20.41″E
- Country: Slovenia
- Traditional region: Lower Carniola
- Statistical region: Southeast Slovenia
- Municipality: Šentrupert

Area
  - Total: 1.34 km^{2} (0.52 sq mi)
- Elevation: 257 m (843 ft)

Population (2002)
  - Total: 136

Slovenska Vas (pronounced [slɔˈʋeːnska ˈʋaːs]; Slovene: Slovenska vas, formerly Nemška vas, German: Deutschdorf) is a village in the Municipality of Šentrupert in southeastern Slovenia. It lies south of Šentrupert on the road from Mirna to Mokronog in the Mirna Valley, part of the traditional region of Lower Carniola. The municipality is now included in the Southeast Slovenia Statistical Region. The settlement is also traversed by the rail line from Sevnica to Trebnje that has a station there.

== Name ==
The name Slovenska vas literally means 'Slovene village'. The village was formerly known as Nemška vas (German: Deutschdorf), literally 'German village'. The former name was a reference to the ethnic German servants living here that worked at the Rakovnik manor farm, owned by the Barbo noble family. Slovene linguists have criticized the change of this name (and other examples of Nemška vas) on the grounds that 'Slovene village' makes no sense in territory where the surrounding villages are also ethnically Slovene, and that it also obscures important information about the history of colonization in Slovenia.

== Dob ==
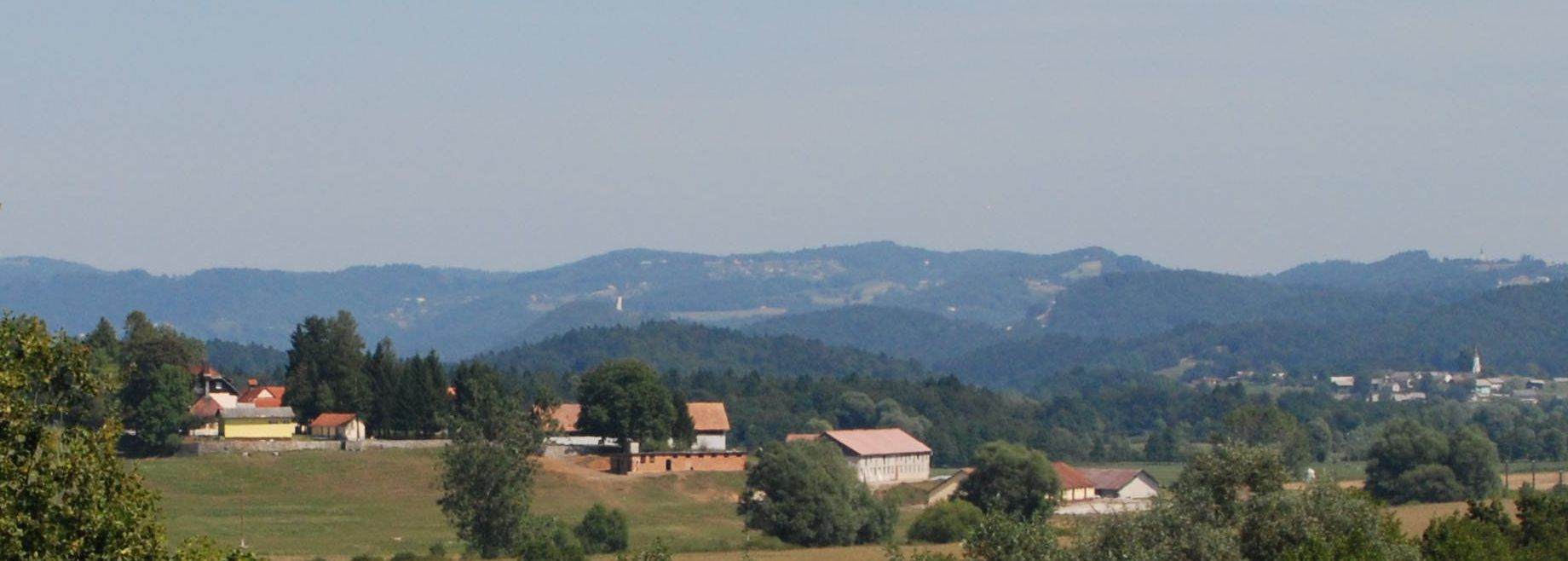
The semi-open department of Dob Prison

Part of Slovenska Vas is named Dob. It is known for Dob Prison, the largest prison by the number of prisoners in the country. It is a male prison that has been operating since 1963 and is intended for the people who have committed the most severe criminal acts. The closed department has the capacity of 420 prisoners, and the semi-open department in the same village has the capacity of 63 prisoners. A pear tree avenue that has been protected as a monument of local significance leads to it from the main road. It gives a special emphasis to the landscape of the Mirna Valley. It was planted in the first half of the 20th century and is a little more than 500 metres (1,600 ft) long. Dob is also known for a Roman aqueduct that was discovered there during earthworks in 1961.

=== Wazenberg Castle ===
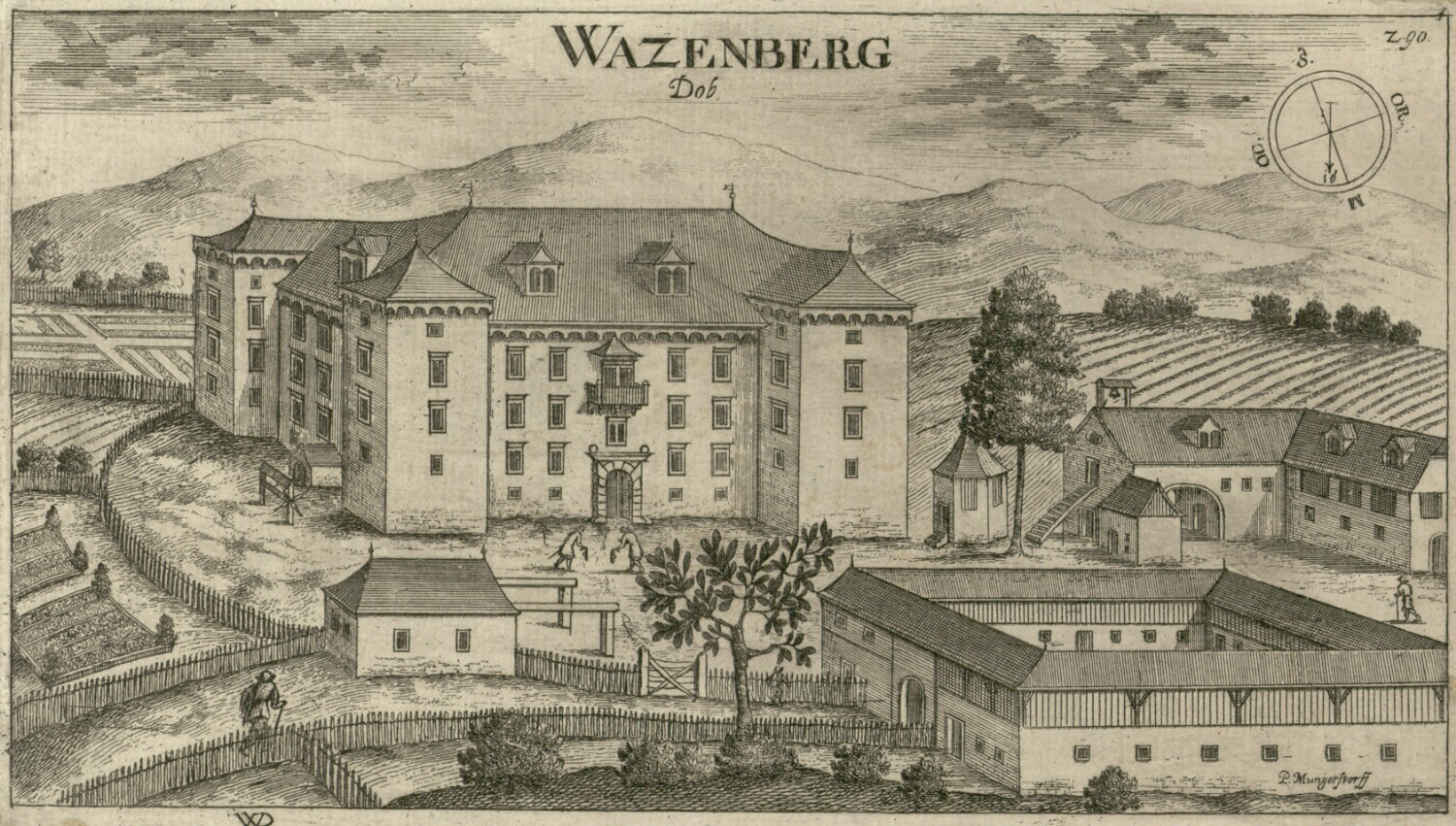
Wazenberg Castle as depicted in an engraving by Johann Weikhard von Valvasor published in 1679

Dob was the site of Wazenberg (or Watzenberg) Castle (Slovene: Dob). The castle was mentioned in written sources in the 14th century, passing through ownership of the Aych, Pyrsch, and Schranckler families before being purchased by the Wazenbergs in 1621. It was then sold to Franz Bernard Lamberg 1723 and to Jobst Weickhard Barbo, Count of Wachsenstein in 1740. The Barbos merged the estate with the estate in Rakovnik, and it remained in the family until the Second World War. On 26 and 27 December 1942, Wazenberg Castle was attacked by the Partisans, who killed all of the residents (including Felix Logothetti, his wife Stella Countess Barbo-Waxenstein, and his son Deodat), looted the castle, and burned it to the ground. After the war, Dob Prison was built at the site of the castle.

== See also ==
- When I Get Out, documentary on Dob, Slovenska Vas
