= When I Get Out =

2025 Slovenian documentary film

- Promotional poster
- Slovene: Ko pridem ven
- Directed by: Metod Pevec
- Screenplay by: Metod Pevec; Olga Michalik; Vladimir Milosevic
- Produced by: Danijel Hočevar; Zala Opara
- Starring: Valon Hoxaj; Nenad Mirović; Denis Mihalič; Matej Groznik
- Cinematography: Metod Pevec
- Edited by: Olga Michalik
- Production companies: Vertigo; RTV Slovenija
- Release dates: 25 October 2025 (Festival of Slovenian Film); 17 August 2026 (Sarajevo)
- Running time: 106 minutes
- Country: Slovenia
- Language: Slovene

When I Get Out (Slovene: Ko pridem ven) is a 2025 Slovenian Documentary film co-written, and directed by Metod Pevec. The film documents its director and a psychiatrist inside the main prison in Dob, Slovenia, where inmates who had committed serious crimes spent a year and a half using psychodrama to revisit their childhood and prepare themselves for an uncertain life after release.

The film had its premiere at the Festival of Slovenian Film on 25 October 2025 in Competition–Featured Documentary program, where it won Vesna for best film according to the audience's choice award.

It held its International Premiere at the 32nd Sarajevo Film Festival on 17 August 2026, screening in the Competition Programme – Documentary Film 2026, and competed for the Heart of Sarajevo award.

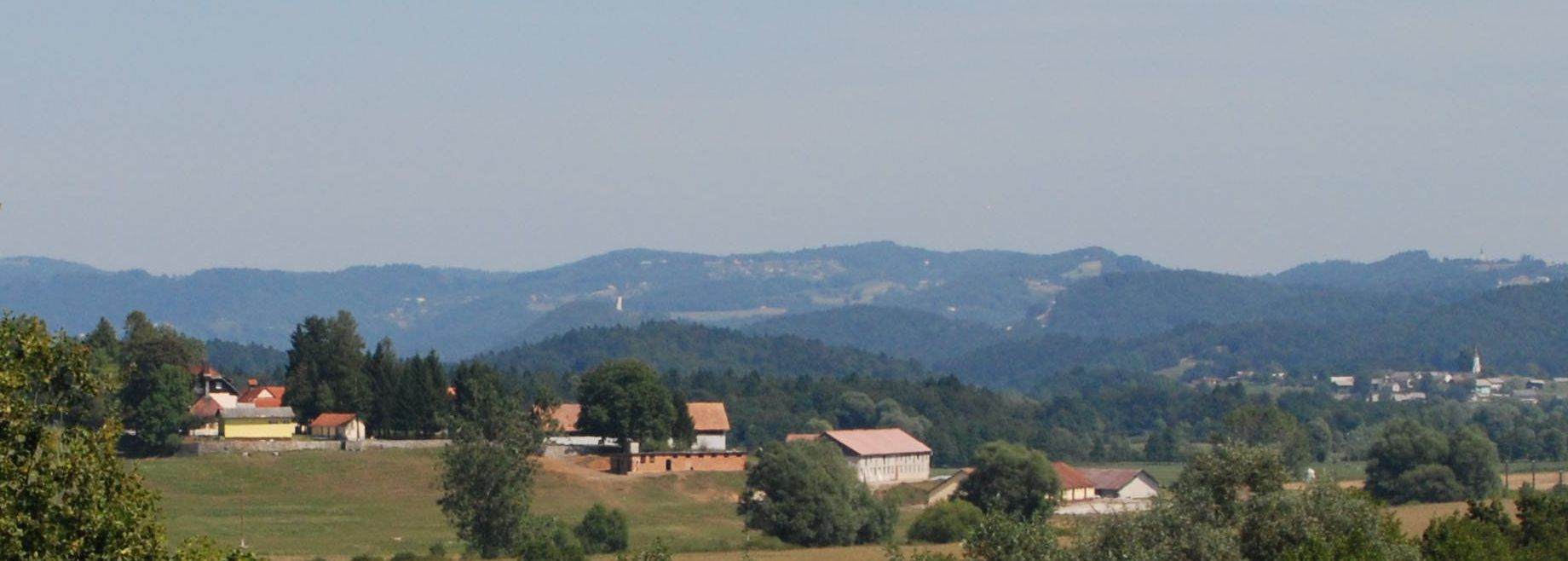
The semi-open department Dob, Slovenska Vas

== Summary ==
The director of the film Metod Pevec and a psychiatrist, Vladimir Milošević, visit Dob Prison in Slovenia. The director thinks the prison holds powerful untold stories, while the psychiatrist believes his psychodrama method can create a safe space for creativity, healing, and imagining a future beyond prison. The psychiatrist, offers a psychodrama workshop to help inmates understand themselves and think about life after release. Most of the men who join are serving long sentences for very serious crimes. He explains that through acting and role play, they will uncover hidden parts of themselves and form unexpected connections with other prisoners. The chosen inmates come from different prison units and mostly do not know each other. Their crimes vary widely—robbery, sexual offences, drug dealing, and murder. All carry heavy moral damage. Some genuinely regret their actions and want to change, while others remain closed off, insisting they were betrayed, judged unfairly, or wrongly convicted.

== Cast ==
- Valon Hoxaj
- Nenad Mirović
- Denis Mihalič
- Matej Groznik
- Andrej Bagari
- Viktor Ermin Hilić
- Sandrijel Brezar
- Primož KosiLan Šabić
- Lan Šabić
- Vladimir Milošević
- Metod Pevec

== Production ==
The film records a year and a half of work inside Dob, Slovenia’s main prison. The camera follows inmates, including men jailed for very serious crimes like armed robbery and murder. In group discussions, the prisoners discuss their backgrounds and personal histories.

== Release ==
When I Get Out had its premiere at the Festival of Slovenian Film on 25 October 2025. Subsequently it was released on 3 April 2026 as part of the Our Films at Home project at Cankarjev dom.

The film was also released in boutique distribution in Slovenian cinemas on 14 April 2026 at Cinema Bežigrad.

It had its International Premiere at the 32nd Sarajevo Film Festival, where it competed for Heart of Sarajevo award in the Competition Programme – Documentary Film 2026 on 17 August 2026.

== Accolades ==
Award	Date of ceremony	Category	Recipient	Result	Ref.
Festival of Slovenian Film	26 October 2025	Vesna for best documentary film	When I Get Out	Nominated	
Festival of Slovenian Film	26 October 2025	Vesna Audience Award	When I Get Out	Won	
Sarajevo Film Festival	21 August 2026	Heart of Sarajevo	When I Get Out	Nominated	
