= Family Therapy (film) =

2024 film by Sonja Prosenc

- Promotional poster
- Slovene: Odrešitev za začetnike
- Literally: Salvation for beginners
- Directed by: Sonja Prosenc
- Written by: Sonja Prosenc
- Produced by: Rok Sečen; Sonja Prosenc; Marta Zaccaron
- Starring: Mila Bezjak; Aliocha Schneider; Marko Mandić; Katarina Stegnar; Judita Franković Brdar; Jure Henigman
- Cinematography: Mitja Ličen
- Edited by: Ivana Fumić
- Music by: Primož Hladnik; Boris Benko
- Production companies: Monoo; Incipit Film; Incitus Films; Wolfgang & Dolly; Living Pictures
- Distributed by: Emera Film
- Release date: 8 June 2024 (Tribeca Film Festival)
- Running time: 122 minutes
- Countries: Slovenia; Italy; Croatia; Serbia; Norway
- Languages: Slovenian; English; French
- Box office: €4.3 million

Family Therapy (Slovene: Odrešitev za začetnike) is a 2024 black comedy film written and directed by Sonja Prosenc. The film inspired by Pier Paolo Pasolini's 1968 Italian allegorical art film Teorema, follows a newly rich family whose life turned upside down when the patriarch's son from another relationship enters the family home and reveals cracks in their staid facade.

The film had its world premiere in the International Narrative Competition section of the Tribeca Film Festival on 8 June 2024.

It was also selected as the Slovenian entry for the Best International Feature Film at the 97th Academy Awards.

== Cast ==
- Mila Bezjak as Agatha
- Aliocha Schneider as Julien
- Marko Mandić as Alexander
- Katarina Stegnar as Olivia
- Judita Franković Brdar as Mila
- Jure Henigman as Tomaž
- Kristoffer Joner as Hunter

== Production ==
In July 2023, the film in the post-production stage was presented at the KVIFF Eastern Promises, the industry platform of the Karlovy Vary International Film Festival.

The filming began in the early October 2022 in Ljubljana, Slovenia.

== Release ==
Family Therapy had its world premiere on 8 June 2024 in the International Narrative Competition section of the Tribeca Film Festival. It also competed for Heart of Sarajevo award in the Competition Programme - Feature Film at the 30th Sarajevo Film Festival on 18 August 2024.

In September 2024, it competed in the International Narrative Competition at the Calgary International Film Festival and had its Canadian Premiere.

In December 2024, it competed at the Les Arcs Film Festival in the Oscar on Skis for the Best International Film, and in January 2025 at the Trieste Film Festival in the Feature-film Competition.

In March 2025 it participated in the Marseille International Music & Cinema Festival and competed for the 2025 Grand Prize for Best Original Score.

The film was released in the Italian cinemas on 28 January 2025.

It was released in the French cinemas on 27 August 2025.

In November 2024, Tribeca Films, an American independent film distribution label acquired the United States distribution rights of the film.

== Reception ==
On the AlloCiné, which lists 14 press reviews, the film obtained an average rating of 2.4/5.

Alissa Simon of Variety reviewing the film at Sarajevo Film Festival described the film as largely enjoyable, though noted that director Sonja Prosenc lets the story lose focus and extend beyond several natural concluding points. However, the film's striking cinematography, compelling performances, "striking score by Primož Hladnik and Boris Benko" and "Tatjana Čanić Stanković’s glorious production design" were highlighted as redeeming qualities.

== Accolades ==
Award	Date of ceremony	Category	Recipient	Result	Ref.
Tribeca Film Festival	16 June 2024	Best International Narrative Feature	Family Therapy	Nominated	
Sarajevo Film Festival	23 August 2024	Heart of Sarajevo	Family Therapy	Nominated	
Sarajevo Film Festival	23 August 2024	CICAE Award	Family Therapy	Won	
Festival of Slovenian Film	26 October 2024	Best Feature Film	Family Therapy	Won	
Festival of Slovenian Film	26 October 2024	Best Screenplay	Sonja Prosenc	Won	
Festival of Slovenian Film	26 October 2024	Best Leading Actress	Katarina Stegnar	Won	
Festival of Slovenian Film	26 October 2024	Best Lead Actor	Marko Mandić	Won	
Festival of Slovenian Film	26 October 2024	Best Original Music	Boris Benko, Primož Hladnik	Won	
Festival of Slovenian Film	26 October 2024	Best Supporting Actress	Mila Bezjak	Won	
Festival of Slovenian Film	26 October 2024	Best Production Design	Tajana Čanić Stanković	Won	

== See also ==
- List of submissions to the 97th Academy Awards for Best International Feature Film
- List of Slovenian submissions for the Academy Award for Best International Feature Film
