= History of Love =

2018 film

- Film poster
- Directed by: Sonja Prosenc
- Starring: Kristoffer Joner
- Release date: 1 July 2018 (Karlovy)
- Running time: 105 minutes
- Country: Slovenia
- Language: Slovene

History of Love (Slovene: Zgodovina ljubezni) is a 2018 Slovenian drama film directed by Sonja Prosenc. It was selected as the Slovenian entry for the Best International Feature Film at the 92nd Academy Awards, but it was not nominated.

== Plot ==
A 17-year-old girl mourning her mother's death is drawn into an altered reality to make sense of her emotions.

== Cast ==
- Kristoffer Joner as The conductor
- Doroteja Nadrah as Iva
- Zita Fusco as Mother

== See also ==
- List of submissions to the 92nd Academy Awards for Best International Feature Film
- List of Slovenian submissions for the Academy Award for Best International Feature Film
