= Janez Lapajne =

Slovenian filmmaker (born 1967)

Janez Lapajne (Slovene: [yannez la-pie-nay]; born 24 June 1967 in Celje, Slovenia, grew up in Ljubljana, Slovenia is a Slovenian film director, producer, writer, editor and production designer.

The son of geophysicist Janez K. Lapajne, he graduated in film directing from the University of Ljubljana.

He founded PoEtika, an occasional academy for researching the art of film directing, which he heads as mentor. He also directs for theatre, radio and television.

He has won several awards for his student works and his feature films.

He is former first president of Directors Guild of Slovenia.

Lapajne is related to Slovenian female painter Ivana Kobilca.

== Filmography ==
=== As director ===
- 1992 – Blackred/Črnordeče (Zveza Kulturnih Organizacij Slovenije), short fiction
- 1995 – An Electric Chair Over Ljubljana or What a Painter Can Do With Two Suitcases/Električni stol nad Ljubljano ali Kaj počne slikar z dvema kovčkoma (University of Ljubljana and Radiotelevizija Slovenija), short documentary
- 1996 – The Smile/Smehljaj (University of Ljubljana), short fiction
- 1997 – The Kanižarica Lignite Mine Closure/Rudnik rjavega premoga Kanižarica v zapiranju (Orson), short documentary
- 1997 – Breakages/Črepinjice (University of Ljubljana), diploma film, short fiction
- 2002 – Rustling Landscapes/Šelestenje (Triglav film, VPK), first feature film
- 2006 – Short Circuits/Kratki stiki (Triglav film), feature film
- 2009 – Personal Baggage/Osebna prtljaga (Triglav film), feature film
- 2012 – Who's Afraid of the Big Black Wolf?/Kdo se boji črnega moža?/Wer hat Angst vorm Schwarzen Mann? (Triglav film), short fiction
- 2019 – Dromedary/Dromedar (Triglav film), short fiction
- 2026 – Drama/Drama (Triglav film), short fiction

=== As producer ===
- 2002 – Rustling Landscapes/Šelestenje (Triglav film, VPK), first feature film
- 2006 – Short Circuits/Kratki stiki (Triglav film), feature film
- 2013 – Class Enemy/Razredni sovražnik (Triglav film), first feature film
- 2019 – Dromedary/Dromedar (Triglav film), short fiction

=== As writer ===
- 1992 – Blackred/Črnordeče (Zveza Kulturnih Organizacij Slovenije), short fiction
- 1995 – An Electric Chair Over Ljubljana or What a Painter Can Do With Two Suitcases/Električni stol nad Ljubljano ali Kaj počne slikar z dvema kovčkoma (University of Ljubljana and Radiotelevizija Slovenija), short documentary
- 1996 – Cinders/Pepelca (University of Ljubljana), short documentary
- 1996 – The Smile/Smehljaj (University of Ljubljana), short fiction
- 1997 – The Kanižarica Lignite Mine Closure/Rudnik rjavega premoga Kanižarica v zapiranju (Orson), short documentary
- 1997 – Breakages/Črepinjice (University of Ljubljana), diploma film, short fiction
- 2002 – Rustling Landscapes/Šelestenje (Triglav film, VPK), first feature film
- 2004 – Lilies of the Valley/Solzice (University of Ljubljana and Radiotelevizija Slovenija), short fiction
- 2006 – Short Circuits/Kratki stiki (Triglav film), feature film
- 2009 – Personal Baggage/Osebna prtljaga (Triglav film), feature film
- 2012 – Who's Afraid of the Big Black Wolf?/Kdo se boji črnega moža?/Wer hat Angst vorm Schwarzen Mann? (Triglav film), short fiction
- 2013 – Dual/Dvojina (Perfo), feature film
- 2013 – Class Enemy/Razredni sovražnik (Triglav film), first feature film
- 2019 – Dromedary/Dromedar (Triglav film), short fiction
- 2026 – Drama/Drama (Triglav film), short fiction

=== As editor ===
- 1996 – The Smile/Smehljaj (University of Ljubljana), short fiction (uncredited)
- 2002 – Rustling Landscapes/Šelestenje (Triglav film, VPK), first feature film
- 2004 – Lilies of the Valley/Solzice (University of Ljubljana and Radiotelevizija Slovenija), short fiction
- 2006 – Short Circuits/Kratki stiki (Triglav film), feature film
- 2009 – Personal Baggage/Osebna prtljaga (Triglav film), feature film
- 2011 – A Trip/Izlet (Perfo, Invida, MC Krka), first feature film
- 2012 – Who's Afraid of the Big Black Wolf?/Kdo se boji črnega moža?/Wer hat Angst vorm Schwarzen Mann? (Triglav film), short fiction
- 2013 – Dual/Dvojina (Perfo), feature film
- 2013 – Class Enemy/Razredni sovražnik (Triglav film), first feature film
- 2019 – Dromedary/Dromedar (Triglav film), short fiction
- 2026 – Drama/Drama (Triglav film), short fiction

=== As production designer ===
- 1992 – Blackred/Črnordeče (Zveza Kulturnih Organizacij Slovenije), short fiction (uncredited)
- 2002 – Rustling Landscapes/Šelestenje (Triglav film, VPK), first feature film
- 2006 – Short Circuits/Kratki stiki (Triglav film), feature film
- 2009 – Personal Baggage/Osebna prtljaga (Triglav film), feature film
- 2012 – Who's Afraid of the Big Black Wolf?/Kdo se boji črnega moža?/Wer hat Angst vorm Schwarzen Mann? (Triglav film), short fiction
- 2019 – Dromedary/Dromedar (Triglav film), short fiction
- 2026 – Drama/Drama (Triglav film), short fiction (currently in postproduction)

=== As costume designer ===
- 1992 – Blackred/Črnordeče (Zveza Kulturnih Organizacij Slovenije), short fiction (uncredited)
- 1996 – The Smile/Smehljaj (University of Ljubljana), short fiction

=== As mentor ===
- 2004 – Birth/Rojstvo (PoEtika, Triglav film), short fiction
- 2004 – Life/Življenje (PoEtika, Triglav film), short fiction
- 2004 – Death/Smrt (PoEtika, Triglav film), short fiction
- 2007 – Swamp/Močvirje (PoEtika, ZKD Grosuplje, Smila Film), short fiction
- 2007 – The Pianist/Pianist (PoEtika, ZKD Grosuplje, Smila Film), short fiction
- 2008 – I Love You/Rad te imam (Filmski tabor Kolpa, ZIK Črnomelj), short fiction
- 2009 – Rolled Dumplings/Štruklji (PoEtika, Triglav film, FFNM), short fiction
- 2009 – Nothing Particular/N'č tazga (PoEtika, Triglav film, FFNM), short fiction

=== Appearance ===
- 2001 – Tiigra (Studio Arkadena), fiction-documentary, as himself

== Theatre ==
- director:

- 1999 - Several authors: Coquettnesses/Spogledljivosti (The Student Organisation of the University of Ljubljana, Primorski poletni festival and Orson) - world premiere - at 6th Primorski poletni festival, Koper 1999.
- 2004 - David Auburn: Proof (Slovenian National Theatre Celje/Slovensko ljudsko gledališče Celje) - Slovenian premiere - season 2003/04,
- 2004 - John Osborne: Look Back in Anger (Municipal Theatre Ljubljana/Mestno gledališče ljubljansko) - season 2004/05,
- 2006 - Neil LaBute: Bash: Latter-Day Plays (Imaginarni and Mini Teater) - Slovenian premiere - season 2005/06,
- 2007 - Nejc Gazvoda: The Swing/Gugalnica (Imaginarni) - world premiere - season 2007/08.

- art director:

- 1999 - Several authors: Coquettnesses/Spogledljivosti (The Student Organisation of the University of Ljubljana, Primorski poletni festival and Orson) - world premiere - at 6th Primorski poletni festival, Koper 1999,
- 2004 - John Osborne: Look Back in Anger (Municipal Theatre Ljubljana/Mestno gledališče ljubljansko) - season 2004/05,
- 2006 - Neil LaBute: Bash: Latter-Day Plays (Imaginarni and Mini Teater) - Slovenian premiere - season 2005/06,
- 2007 - Nejc Gazvoda: The Swing/Gugalnica (Imaginarni) - world premiere - season 2007/08.

- costume designer:

- 1999 - Several authors: Coquettnesses/Spogledljivosti (The Student Organisation of the University of Ljubljana, Primorski poletni festival and Orson) - world premiere - at 6th Primorski poletni festival, Koper 1999.

- film crew director:

- 2010 - Ingmar Bergman: Autumn Sonata/Höstsonaten (Slovenian National Theatre Celje/Slovensko ljudsko gledališče Celje) - Slovenian premiere - season 2009/10.

- video:

- 2003 - Witold Gombrowicz: Yvonne, Princess of Burgundy/Ivona, Księżnicka Burgunda (Prešernovo gledališče Kranj) - season 2003/04,
- 2004 - John Osborne: Look Back in Anger (Municipal Theatre Ljubljana/Mestno gledališče ljubljansko) - season 2004/05.

- actor:

- 1996 - Matjaž Kmecl: Trubar/Trubar (Cankarjev dom, Radiotelevizija Slovenija and Micom) - world premiere - season 1996/97.
