= Euro-Balkan Film Festival =

Euro Balkan Film Festival
- Location: Rome
- Directors: Mario Bova

Euro Balkan Film Festival is a film festival established in by Associazione Occhio Blu Anna Cenerini Bova and held annually in Rome. The event promotes cultural cooperation between Italy and the Balkan countries. Its partners include the Italian Ministry of Culture and Ministry of Foreign Affairs, Cinecittà, Croatian Audiovisual Centre, and many more.

The festival was founded in 2018 and initially titled Balkan Film Festival. The change of name was announced in 2024, as explained by the festival's president Mario Bova, the rename was made in homage to the common European origins of all Balkan cinema.

The festival's main venues are Nuovo Cinema Aquila and Casa del Cinema, but the screenings also take place at 8 different locations around the city. The festival includes various cultural events, meetings, and workshops.

== Editions ==
=== 2020 ===
The 5th edition was held from 8 to 11 October 2020. Film-opening: Honeyland by Tamara Kotevska and Ljubomir Stefanov, other screenings included by Defunct Zacharias Mavroeidis, The Voice by Ognjen Sviličić, Kristina Grozeva's and Petar Valchanov's The Father, etc. The retrospective included The General of the Dead Army by Luciano Tovoli.

=== 2021 ===
The 5th edition was held from 6 to 10 October 2021. The opening day included a talk with Milcho Manchevski and a special screening of his film VRBA. The edition hosted a panel Cinema al femminile nei Balcani (Women in Balkan cinema). The edition featured the Italian premiere of Andrea Štaka's Mare, as well as a special screening of Goran Paskaljević's Honeymoons. The festival was closed by Gregor Božič's Stories from the Chestnut Woods.

=== 2022 ===
The 5th edition took place from November 29 to December 4, 2022. The festival was opened with a discussion on Balkan cinema between Jasmila Žbanić and Francesco Ranieri Martinotti, and the screening of Quo Vadis, Aida? 12 films were selected for the main competition, including The Albanian Virgin by Bujar Alimani, Darkling by Dusan Milic, Christos Passalis&Syllas Tzoumerkas's The City and the City, etc.

=== 2023 ===
The 6th edition went on from 7 to 13 November 2023. The jury included Elma Tataragic, Gregor Bozic, Wilma Labate, Amedeo Pagani, Mario Bova, and Roland Sejko. Best Director award went to Sara Kern for Moja Vesna (Slovenia-Australia co-production), Best Film — Safe Place by Juraj Lerotić (Croatia/Slovenia), Best Actress — Ksenija Marinković for Have You Seen This Woman?, Best Short — Things Unheard Of by Ramazan Kiliç, Best Actor — Goran Marković and Juraj Lerotić for Safe Place by Juraj Lerotić (Croatia/Slovenia), Special Mention — Granny’s sexual life by Urška Djukić & Émilie Pigeard, Best Screenplay — Air Hostess-737 by Thananis Neofotistou.

=== 2024 ===
On 20–21 April 2024, the festival hosted a two-day preview in Tirana.

=== 2025 ===
The festival took place on 30 October — 6 November, 2025. Afterwar by Birgitte Stærmose took the main prize. Little Trouble Girls by Urška Djukić won Special Mention Young Perspective Award.
