= Love Child (2011 film) =

2011 film

- Film poster
- Directed by: Leticia Tonos
- Written by: Leticia Tonos
- Produced by: Leticia Tonos
- Starring: Julietta Rodriguez
- Cinematography: Sonnel Velazquez
- Release date: 30 March 2011
- Running time: 97 minutes
- Country: Dominican Republic
- Language: Spanish

Love Child (Spanish: La hija natural) is a 2011 Dominican Republic romantic drama film written and directed by Leticia Tonos. The film was selected as the Dominican Republic entry for the Best Foreign Language Film at the 84th Academy Awards, but it did not make the final shortlist.

== Cast ==
- Julietta Rodriguez as Maria
- Victor Checo as Joaquin
- Andres Ramos as Justiniano
- Gastner Legerme as Polo Montifa
- Dionis Rufino as Melido
- Kalent Zaiz as Juana
- Frank Perozo as Rubi
- Héctor Sierra as Papito

== See also ==
- List of submissions to the 84th Academy Awards for Best Foreign Language Film
- List of Dominican submissions for the Academy Award for Best Foreign Language Film
