= Festival of Slovenian Film =

Festival of Slovenian Film Portorož
- 28th edition official poster
- Predecessor: Slovene Film Week; Slovene Film Marathon
- Founded: 1991
- Awards: Vesna Awards
- Artistic director: Bojan Labovic
- Festival date: Opening: 21 October 2025; Closing: 26 October 2025
- Website: https://fsf.si/

Current: 28th
- 29th 27th

The Festival of Slovenian Film Portorož is an annual film festival held in Portorož, Slovenia, dedicated to Slovenian cinema and television productions.

== Profile ==
The festival takes place every year in the Slovenian city of Portorož. Its roots date to 1973, when the Slovene Film Week was launched in Celje, which then evolved into the Slovene Film Marathon in 1991. FSF is managed by the Slovenian Film Centre. In 2017, FSF launched its industry section and co-production market.

The Slovenian submission for the Best Foreign-language Film Academy Award is chosen at FSF. As of 2021, the team includes: director Bojan Labović, members of the council Nina Ukmar, Blaž Završnik, Urban Kuntarič, Zoran Dževerdanović, Tomi Matić, Matej Knepp, and the president of the council Jelka Stergel.

Vesna Awards are given for the Best Feature, Best Feature-length Fiction Film, Best Short Fiction Film, Best Animated Film, Best Experimental Film, Best Director, Best Screenplay, etc. Special awards are: Slovenian Art Cinema Association Award, the Association of Slovenian Film Critics Award for best Slovenian feature film in the Official Competition, IRIDIUM Award for best feature debut. Milka and Metod Badjura Lifetime Achievement Award.

Apart from the competitions, special screenings, events and exhibitions, the festival hosts numerous professional meetings as a part of its industry program.

== Editions ==
=== 2012 ===
The 15th edition ran from 27 to 30 September 2012. Slobodan Maksimović's Thanks for Sunderland won the Vesna Award for the Best Feature Film. Metod Pevec was chosen Best Director (for Tango Abrazos).

=== 2020 ===
Amid the COVID-19 pandemic, FSF was relocated to Ljubljana and held in hybrid mode.

=== 2021 ===
The 24th edition was the first held under the new director, Bojan Labović, who took the post after Jelka Stergel. Film-opening: Inventura by Darko Sink. Emilija Soklič was honoured with the Lifetime Achievement Award, while Serbian director Slobodan Šijan was granted the title of the Friend of Slovenian Cinema.

=== 2023 ===
The 26th edition took place from 3 to 8 October 2023 and featured a line-up of 94 films, 55 of them in competition. Rado Likon was presented with the Milka and Metod Badjura Lifetime Achievement Award.

=== 2024 ===
The 27th edition of the Festival took place from 22 to 27 October in the coastal town of Portorož. Family Therapy black comedy film written, directed and produced by Sonja Prosenc, won seven awards including the Best Film.

=== 2025 ===
The 28th edition of the Festival took place from 21 to 26 October in the coastal town of Portorož. Little Trouble Girls drama film co-written and directed by Urška Djukić, won six awards including the Best Film. When I Get Out, a documentary by Metod Pevec was awarded audience's choice award for the best film.
