= Stories from the Chestnut Woods =

2019 film

- Film poster
- Directed by: Gregor Božič
- Screenplay by: Gregor Božič, Marina Gumzi
- Produced by: Marina Gumzi
- Starring: Massimo De Francovich
- Cinematography: Ferran Paredes Rubio
- Music by: Hekla Magnúsdóttir
- Release date: 8 September 2019 (TIFF)
- Running time: 81 minutes
- Country: Slovenia
- Languages: Slovenian; Italian

Stories from the Chestnut Woods (Slovene: Zgodbe iz kostanjevih gozdov) is a 2019 Slovenian drama, Gregor Božič's feature debut. It premiered at the 2019 Toronto International Film Festival (TIFF) in September 2019 and was selected as the Slovenian entry for the Best International Feature Film at the 93rd Academy Awards, but it was not nominated.

== Plot ==
Shortly after World War II, in a forest between Italy and Yugoslavia, a carpenter and a chestnut seller share stories.

== Critical response and accolades ==
Stories from the Chestnut Woods won the Vesna Award for best film at the 22nd Festival of Slovenian Film in Portorož, the Best Film Award at Tallinn Black Nights Film Festival. It was the closing film of the 5th Euro-Balkan Film Festival.

== Cast ==
- Massimo De Francovich as Mario
- Ivana Roščić as Marta
- Tomi Janežič as dr. Toni
- Giusi Merli as Dora

== See also ==
- List of submissions to the 93rd Academy Awards for Best International Feature Film
- List of Slovenian submissions for the Academy Award for Best International Feature Film
