= Seduce Me =

2013 film

- Film poster
- Directed by: Marko Šantić
- Written by: Marko Šantić
- Starring: Janko Mandić
- Release date: 14 September 2013
- Running time: 83 minutes
- Country: Slovenia
- Language: Slovene

Seduce Me (Slovene: Zapelji me) is a 2013 Slovenian drama film written and directed by Marko Šantić. It was selected as the Slovenian entry for the Best Foreign Language Film at the 87th Academy Awards, but was not nominated.

== Cast ==
- Janko Mandić as Luka
- Nina Rakovec as Ajda
- Nataša Barbara Gračner as Luka's mother
- Peter Musevski as Supervisor
- Dario Varga as Milan
- Primož Pirnat as Blaž
- Grega Zorc as Stane
- Ljerka Belak as Milena
- Igor Žužek as Uncle Franci
- Igor Samobor as Luka's father
- Maja Gal Štromar as Irma

== Plot ==
The protagonist, a 19-year old Luka, has spent most part of his life in an orphanage. Abandoned by his relatives nine years ago, he now dreams of visiting the grave of his father.

== See also ==
- List of submissions to the 87th Academy Awards for Best Foreign Language Film
- List of Slovenian submissions for the Academy Award for Best Foreign Language Film
