= Janez Burger =

Slovene film director

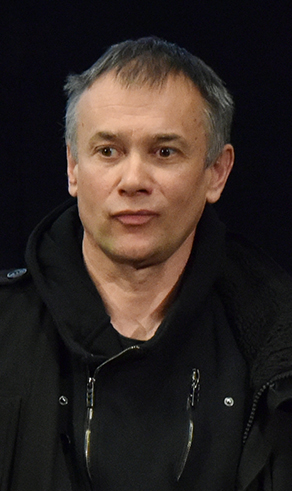
- Janez Burger in 2018
- Born: 21 March 1965 (age 61); Kranj, Socialist Republic of Slovenia
- Occupations: Film director, screenwriter, producer
- Years active: 1997 – present

Janez Burger (born 21 March 1965) is a Slovene film director, screenwriter and producer.

== Life and career ==
Born in Kranj, Socialist Republic of Slovenia, Burger grew up in Železniki and now lives and works in Ljubljana . In 1986 he started his studies on Faculty of Economics in Ljubljana, but in 1990 quit this studies and moved to study at Film and TV School of the Academy of Performing Arts in Prague (FAMU) . In 1996 he graduated from film and TV direction at FAMU and moved back to Ljubljana.

In Slovenia he established his theatre group Burgerteater. In 1997 he shot his first feature film Idle Running. The world premiere took place at the Karlovy Vary International Film Festival in 1999 in the international competition programme. Idle Running had been presented at more than 60 festivals worldwide and won the Grand Prize and the Findling Award in Cottbus.

In 2002, Burger shot his second film Ruins. The film had its world premiere on the International Film Festival Rotterdam in 2005.

Together with Jan Cvitkovič he established the production company Stara Gara in 2003 and was a producer of Cvitkovič's award-winning film Gravehopping.

In 2009 he shot his third feature film Silent Sonata, a film without dialogue. The film had its world premiere at the International Film Festival Rotterdam in 2011.

== Filmography ==
=== Feature films ===
- Ivan (2017)
- Silent Sonata (2010, 75 minutes), director and writer
- Ruins (2004, 100 minutes), director and co-writer
- Idle Running (1999, 90 minutes), director and co-writer

=== Short films ===
- On the Sunny Side of the Alps (2007, 15 minutes), short feature, director and writer
- Matura 2000 (2000, 10 minutes), documentary, director and writer
- Door (1989, 10 minutes), amateur short feature, director and writer

=== TV films ===
- Sonja (2007), feature TV drama, director
- Novak family (2000) feature TV series, director
- Sweet Little House(1998) short TV documentary, director and writer
