= Eino Räsänen =

Finnish politician

Eino August Räsänen (15 November 1921, Kuopion maalaiskunta – 8 September 1997) was a Finnish politician. He was a Member of the Parliament of Finland from 1962 to 1970, representing the Agrarian League, which renamed itself the Centre Party in 1965.
