= Pauliina Räsänen =

Finnish circus performer and actress

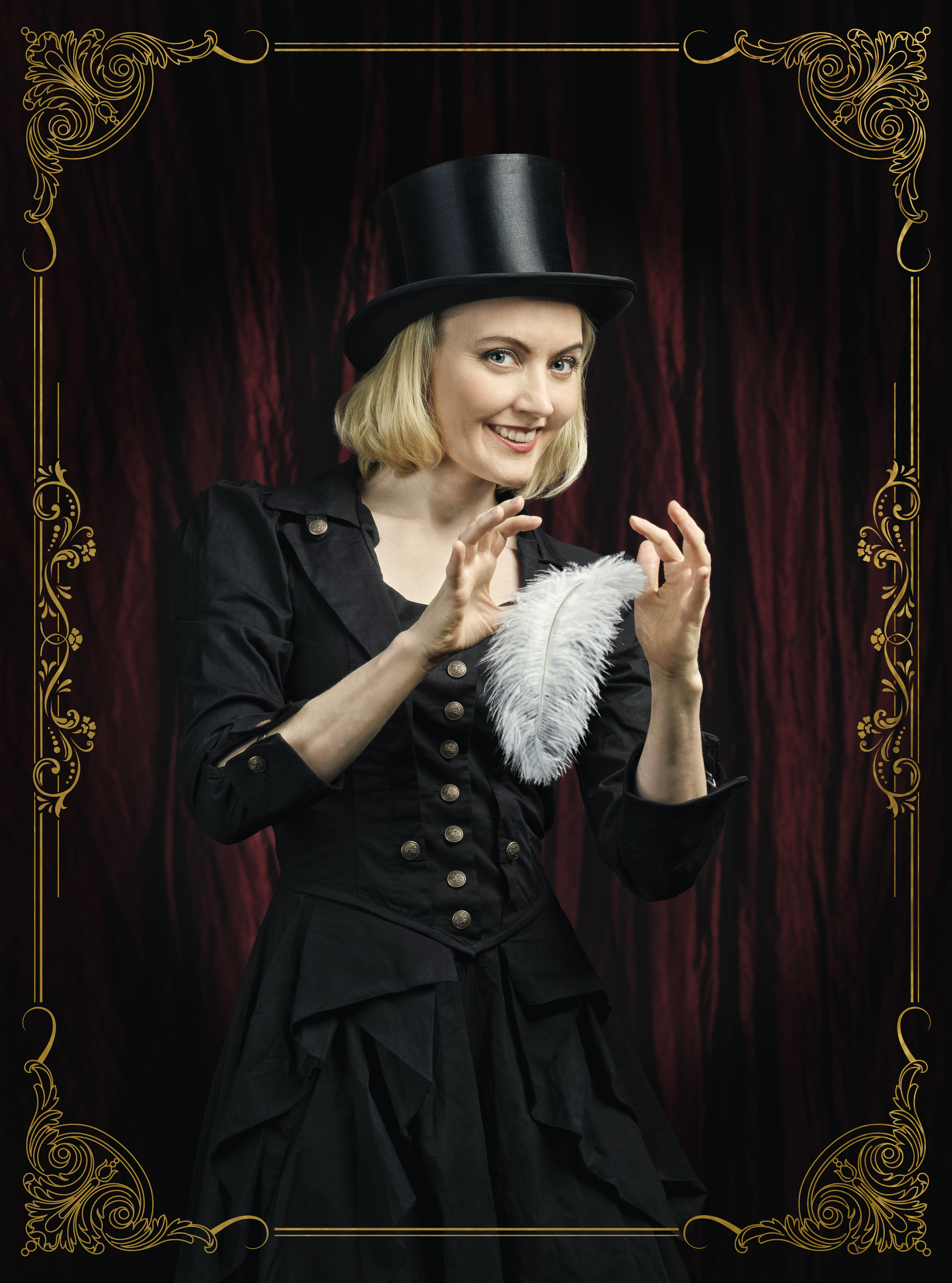

Tuuli Pauliina Räsänen is a circus performer and actress from Finland. Her career jump-started when she was invited to perform as the first Fennoscandian soloist with Cirque du Soleil. She was awarded a five-year grant from Finland's Central Commission of Arts to pursuit artistic work. She has succeeded in establishing her career in the international market and at the moment performs with Komische Oper Berlin.

== Speciality ==
Her special skills include aerial acrobatics such as swinging trapeze, aerial silk and aerial hoop. She also performs a hand-to-hand acrobatic act with her Russian partner, Viatcheslav Volkov (born 9 February 1976 in Yaroslavl), a former World Champion of Sport Acrobatics.

== Career ==
Pauliina Räsänen started ballet, painting and gymnastics at a very young age. However, her interests lay more in arts than in competition. She enrolled in the Performing Arts High School of Tampere pursuing her acting, improvisation, and speech. After high school she was accepted into the National Circus School of Montreal, where she trained under their performing arts coaches. Pauliina graduated with a difficult routine of swinging trapeze including an original skill, in which she intentionally dislocates her shoulders while executing a salto around the bar. Cirque du Soleil signed her up as their first Fennoscandian artist, to perform in their production Alegría. She toured with Cirque du Soleil for 5 years until she decided to leave in pursuit of other goals.

While in Cirque du Soleil, Pauliina met her future partner Viatcheslav (Slava) Volkov from Russia. The couple found they shared similar visions in personal life as well as in acrobatics. Together they created a hand-to-hand acrobatic act combining elements of dance, acting, and high-level acrobatics. Their performance music is composed by French accordionist Corinne Kuzma. At the moment the couple lives in Kustavi, a small city in the Southern Archipelago of Finland, and regularly performs in European theaters.

Räsänen and Volkov are currently filming a feature film, Circus Fantasticus for Staragara production. Pauliina was also awarded a 5-year grant from the Finnish Central Commission of Arts to continue her artistic goals in Finland.

== ArtTeatro ==
Räsänen and Volkov own their own Finland-based circus arts company and agency, ArtTeatro Ltd. Its goal is to create intimate, touching, and high-level shows in a family-like atmosphere combining theater and circus arts. Their created a show, Cirque Dracula, will be performed as part of the Turku Culture Capital Event in 2011. The cast includes international performers and singers from Europe and Canada.

== Awards ==
- 2008, 5-year grant from Finnish Central Commission of Arts to support Pauliina's artistic projects
- 2008, Yellow Crane Prize, Bronze Medal, at Wuhan International Acrobatic Arts Festival in China

== Performances ==
Film and TV credits

- 2018 Egenland, documentary; role herself, YLE TV1
- 2010 Circus Fantasticus, feature film by Janez Burger; role Angela
- 2007 Hitachi, Commercial for TV and internet; role Spiderwoman, Hong Kong
- 2007 A Leap From the Trapeze, documentary movie by Juha Ikavalko, YLE TV1
- 2007 France 24, "A day with Pauliina", Interview and performance; Paris
- 2007 Eurovision Song Contest Finals, Interval Act with Apocalyptica; role trapeze artist; Helsinki
- 2007 Huomenta Suomi morning TV, MTV3; role guest; Helsinki
- 2006 Ihana Aamu morning TV, MTV3; role guest; Helsinki
- 2005 Alegría 2, Cirque du Soleil film; role principal trapeze dancer; Japan
- 2007 Markku’s Eurovision TV, SubTV; role guest; Helsinki
- 2002 Balancing, a short film by Orlando Wills; role circus artist; Canada
- 2002 Diesel Gasoline Commercial; role Bond Girl; Finland
- 1998 Fire-Eater, feature film; Finland; role stunt performer
- 1999 McDonald’s Commercial; role circus artist; Canada

Performances on stage

- 2016–2020 "Petrushka", Komishce Oper Berlin; role Ptishka, Germany
- 2008 Seven Brothers musical; role Maiden, Venla; Aerial, Hand to Hand; Finland
- 2008 Variete Krystallpalast, Hand to Hand, Character; Germany
- 2008 Variete GOP; Hand to Hand, Solo Trapeze, Character; Germany
- 2007 Eurovision Song Contest Finals, Interval Act with Apocalyptica; Helsinki
- 2007 Exxonmobil Special Event, Hand to Hand; India
- 2007-2002 Cirque du Soleil Alegría; Solo Trapeze, Character; World Tour
- 2001 Cirque Éloize Cirque Orchestra; Aerial Silk, Hand to Hand
