= Hanna Slak =

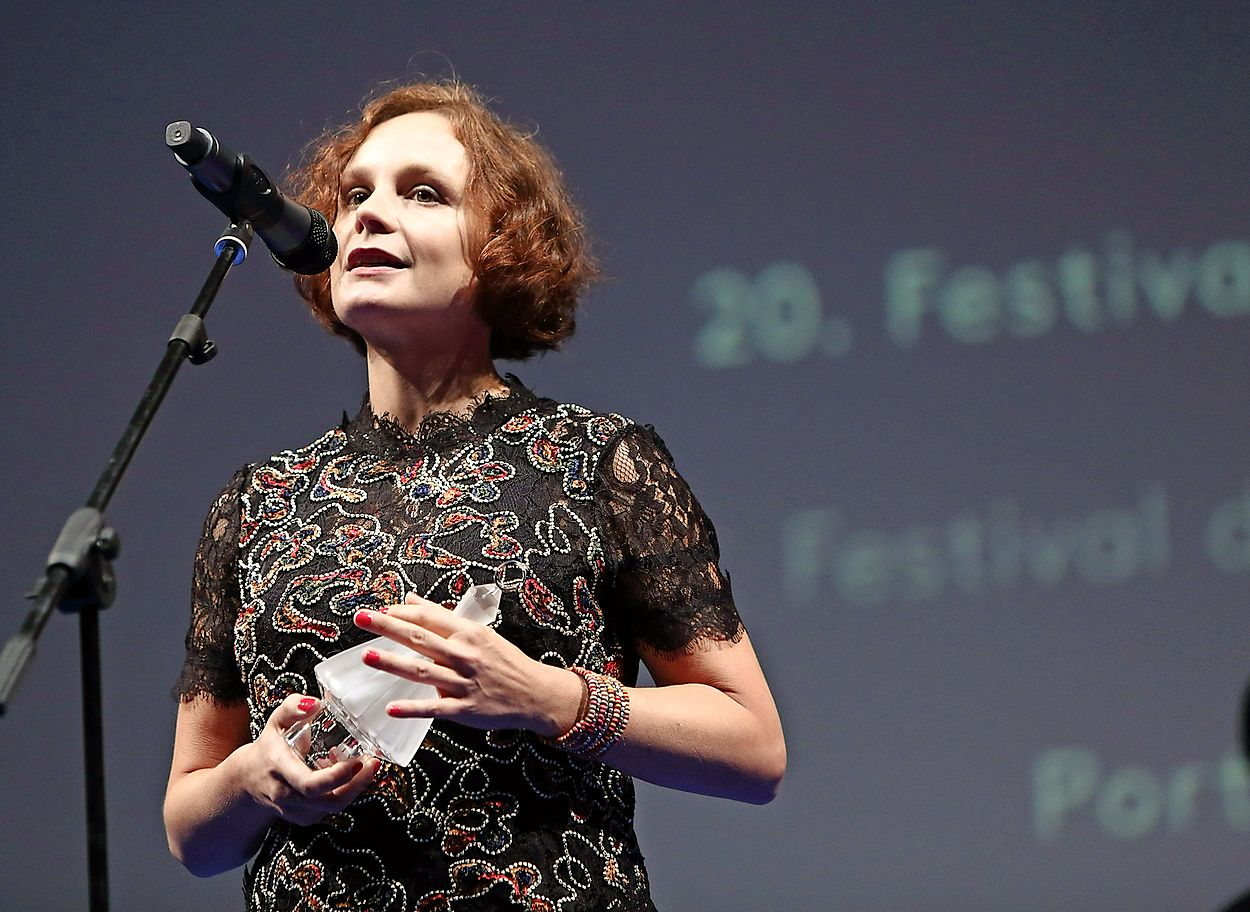
Hanna Slak in Tehran. 2018 Fajr International Film Festival

Hanna Antonina Wojcik Slak (born 1975, Warsaw, Poland) is a Slovenian - German film director and screenwriter.

In 2017, Slak's film Rudar (The Miner) was selected as the Slovenian entry for the Best Foreign Language Film at the 90th Academy Awards.
