= Sonja Prosenc =

Slovene film director, producer and screenwriter (born 1977)

- Born: Slovenj Gradec
- Education: Faculty of Social Sciences, Ljubljana
- Occupation: filmmaker

Sonja Prosenc is a Slovene filmmaker, known as one of Slovenia's most prominent contemporary film directors.

== Biography ==
Prosenc graduated in journalism and culturology from the Faculty of Social Sciences in Ljubljana. After attending several foreign film workshops, she co-founded the production company Monoo with producer Rok Sečen. Her partner Mitja Ličen often collaborates on her films as cinematographer.

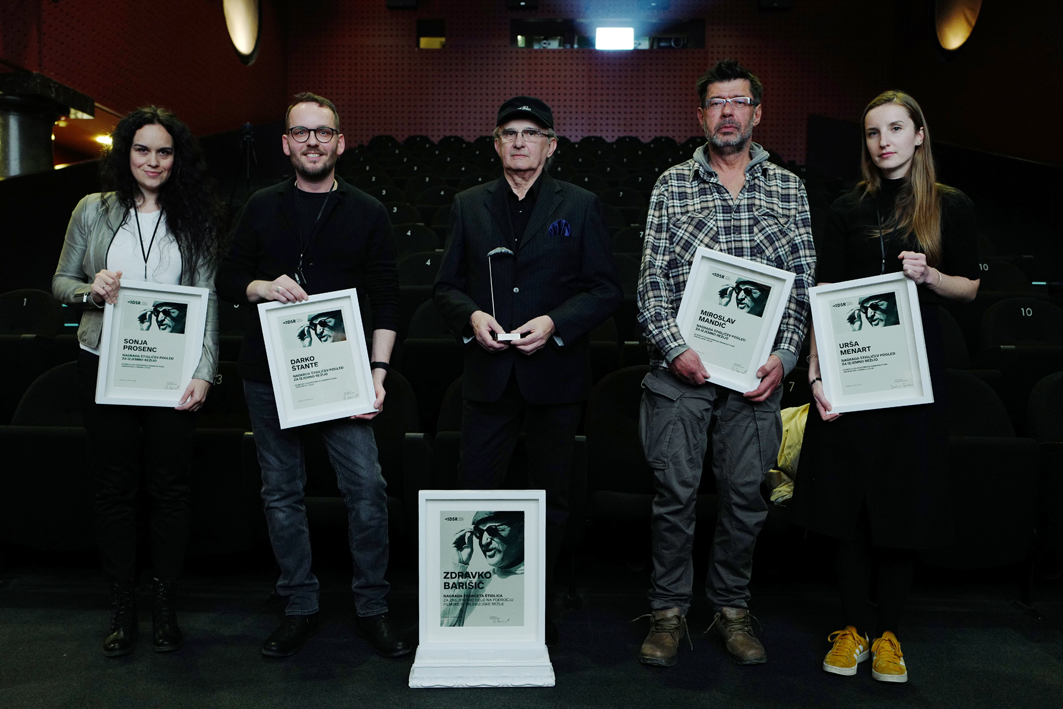
Sonja Prosenc (first from the left) at the 2019 Štiglic awards ceremony

All three of her feature films (The Tree, History of Love, Family Thrapy) were selected as submissions for the Academy Award for Best International Feature Film. Aside from festival awards, Prosenc received the award for exceptional direction by the Directors' Guild of Slovenia in 2019. In addition to festival awards, History of Love also received the Štiglič’s View Award, granted by the Association of Slovenian Directors for outstanding directing.[2] Among numerous international awards from festivals such as the Karlovy Vary International Film Festival, the Sarajevo Film Festival and Slamdance in the United States, her films had, by 2024, also received 13 Slovenian Film Awards (Vesnas) in various categories, including Best Film, Best Short Film, Screenplay, Cinematography, Music, Acting, and others, as well as the Award of the Slovenian Film Critics’ Association, the Živko Nikolić Honorary Award for Contribution to Film Art, and the Grand Prix at the LIFFe Directing Festival, among others.

== Filmography ==
As director

- PoEtika 2004: Smrt (short feature, 2004);
- Nič novega, nič pretiranega (short feature, 2005);
- Jutro (short feature, 2012); also producer and screenwriter
- Mož s krokarjem (documentary, 2012); also screenwriter
- The Tree (Drevo, 2013); also producer and screenwriter
- Impromptu (short feature, 2015); also producer and screenwriter
- History of Love (Zgodovina ljubezni, 2018); also producer and screenwriter
- Raj (short feature, 2019); also producer
- Trigrad (TV-series, 2022); also screenwriter
- Family Therapy (Odrešitev za začetnike, 2024); also producer and screenwriter
