= Rok Biček =

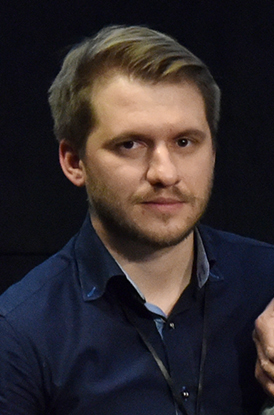
Slovenian Film Directors Association, 2018

Rok Biček (born 17 October 1985 Novo Mesto ) is a Slovenian film director.

== Life ==
Biček graduated from the Academy of Theatre, Radio, Film and Television in Ljubljana with a diploma in film and television directing.

His two feature films, Razredni sovražnik / Class Enemy (2013) and Družina / The Family (2017), won the Vesna Award for Best Film at the Slovenian Film Festival, while Razredni sovražnik was also Slovenia's submission for the Academy Award for Best Foreign Language Film.

He leads the Cvinger Film production company .

== Filmography ==
- 2004: PoEtika 2004: Life, 2004, short film
- 2008: Dan v Benetkah (A Day in Venice), short fiction film
- 2009: Lov na race (Duck Hunt)
- 2010: Nevidni prah (Invisible Dust)
- 2013: Razredni sovražnik (Class Enemy)
- 2016: Good Luck Orlo
- 2017: Druzina (The Family)
- 2018: Consequences
- 2021: Kazenski strel (Penalty Shot)
- 2026: To Hold a Mountain
