= Nejc Gazvoda =

Slovene writer, screenwriter and director

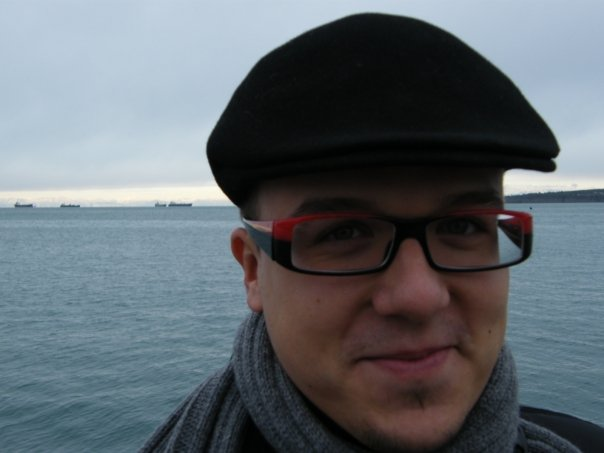
- Nejc Gazvoda, is a Slovene writer, screenwriter and director.
- Born: 5 June 1985 (age 41); Novo Mesto, Socialist Federal Republic of Yugoslavia (now in Slovenia)
- Occupations: Writer, screenwriter, director
- Writing career
- Notable works: Vevericam nič ne uide, Fasunga, V petek so sporočili da bo v nedeljo konec sveta
- Notable awards: Fabula Award; 2006 Vevericam nič ne uide

Nejc Gazvoda (born 5 June 1985) is a Slovene writer, screenwriter and director. He has published a number of novels and collections of short stories and also has written the scripts for two successful TV dramas and has recently written and directed his first feature film Izlet (A Trip) (2011).

Gazvoda was born in Novo Mesto in southeastern Slovenia in 1985. He studied at the Academy for Theatre, Radio, Film and Television in Ljubljana. Whilst still in secondary school he published his book of short stories Vevericam nič ne uide (Nothing Escapes the Squirrels) for which he won the Fabula Award in 2006 for best collection of short prose in Slovene published within the previous two years.

His 2011 film A Trip was selected as the Slovenian entry for the Best Foreign Language Oscar at the 85th Academy Awards, but it did not make the final shortlist.

== Published works ==
- Vevericam nič ne uide (Nothing Escapes the Squirrels), short stories, (2004)
- Camera obscura, novel, (2006)
- Sanjajo tisti, ki preveč spijo, novel, (2007)
- Fasunga, short stories, (2007)
- V petek so sporočili, da bo v nedeljo konec sveta (On Friday We Were Told the World Would End on Sunday), short stories, (2009), short stories, (2009)

== Filmography ==
- Kot ptič, short documentary (2006) – writer and director
- Bordo rdeča, short film (2007) – writer and director
- Skrbnik, short film (2008) – writer and director
- Osebna prtljaga, feature film (2009) – co-writer
- Smehljaji, short film (2010) – writer
- Izlet (A Trip), feature film (2011) – writer and director
- Dvojina (Dual), feature film (2013) - writer and director
- Class Enemy (2013) – writer
