= Directors Guild of Slovenia =

Directors Guild of Slovenia (DSR - Društvo slovenskih režiserjev) represents the interests of film and television directors in the Slovenian motion picture industry. It was founded in 2005. This organization is a full member of La Fédération Européenne des Réalisateurs de l'Audiovisuel (FERA).

== Presidents ==
- 2005–2006 - Janez Lapajne
- 2006–2010 - Martin Srebotnjak
- 2010–present - Miha Hočevar
