= Metod Pevec =

Slovenian film director, actor, and screenwriter (1958)

Metod Pevec (2022)
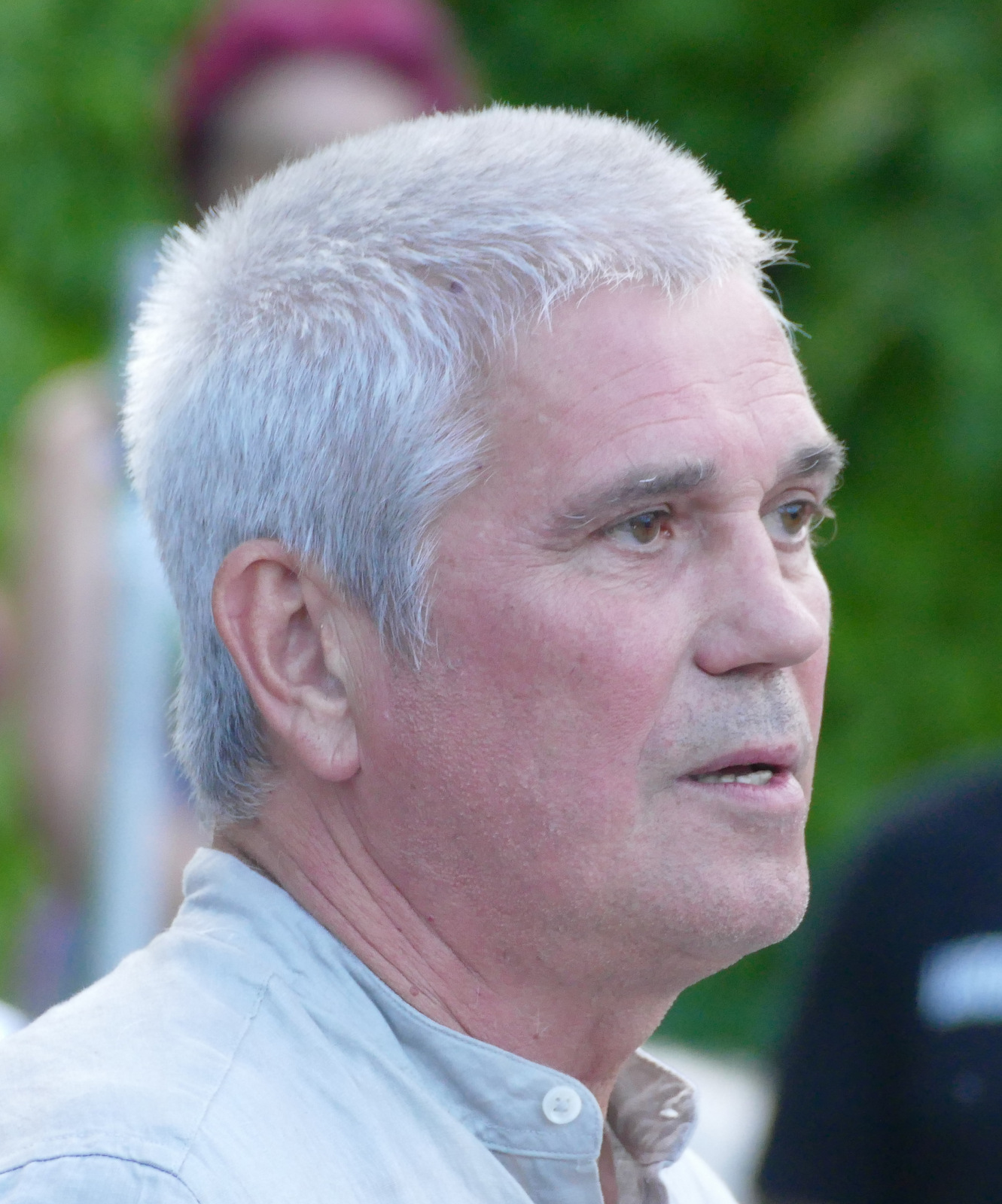
- Born: May 28, 1958 (age 68); Ljubljana
- Occupation: film director

Metod Pevec is a Slovenian film director, actor, and screenwriter.

Pevec was born in Ljubljana, Yugoslavia. In his youth, he studied Philosophy and Comparative Literature at the Faculty of Arts, University of Ljubljana.

He began acting in the late 1970s and gradually rose to lead roles in several TV series and Slovenian and Yugoslav films. Notable are his collaborations with the Serbian director Živojin Pavlović.

In the 1980s, he published his first short stories, screenplays, novels, and radio dramas.

His debut as a director came in 1992, when Pevec filmed a short Vse je pod kontrolo (Everything Is Under Control). Three years later he made his first feature, Carmen. After the dissolution of Yugoslavia he was one of the first directors to work and revive cinema in Slovenia. In his films, he studies how the transition from the socialist system to neo-capitalism influenced the society and people of his country.

== Selected filmography ==
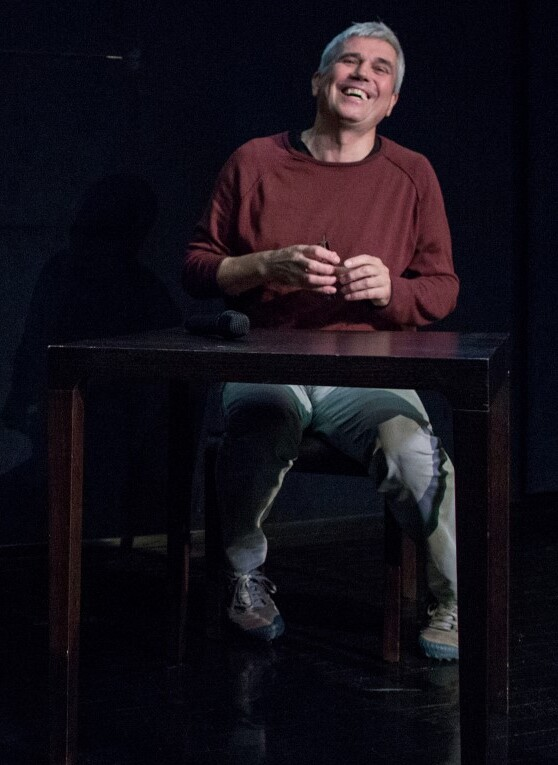
(2016)

- When I Get Out (Documentary, 2026)
- Jaz sem Frenk (I Am Frank, 2019);
- Dom (Home, doc., 2015);
- Vaje v objemu (Tango Abrazos, 2012) — Vesna Award for Best Director at Festival of Slovenian Film;
- Lahko noč, gospodična (Good Night, Missy, 2011);
- Estrellita – pesem za domov (Estrellita, 2006);
- Beneath Her Window (2003);
- Carmen (1995);
- Vse je pod kontrolo (Everything Is Under Control, short, 1992).
