= Directors Guild of Nigeria =

Nigerian entertainment guild

The Directors Guild of Nigeria (DGN) is an entertainment guild which serves as the umbrella for film and television directors in the Nigerian motion picture industry. Originally founded in 1999, it is currently headed by Victor Okhai who serves as the President.
