= List of Slovenian actors =

A list of notable actors from Slovenia:

- Lenore Aubert
- Maks Bajc
- Miha Baloh
- Matija Barl
- Polde Bibič
- Demeter Bitenc
- Yuri Bradac
- Sebastian Cavazza
- Janez Drozg
- Emil Filipčič
- Jure Godler
- Nina Ivanišin
- Jure Ivanušič
- Tomi Janežič
- Polona Juh
- Ida Kravanja
- Iztok Mlakar
- Peter Musevski
- Radko Polič
- Branko Pintarič
- Tanja Ribič
- Stane Sever
- Vladimir Skrbinsek
- Bert Sotlar
- Mira Stupica
- Jernej Šugman
- Zlatko Šugman
- Saša Tabaković
- Aliash Tepina
- Stevo Žigon
- Dragan Živadinov
- Jonas Žnidaršič
- Katarina Čas
