= Lea and Darija =

- Film poster
- Croatian: Lea i Darija
- Directed by: Branko Ivanda
- Starring: Klara Naka; Tamy Zajec
- Release date: 29 January 2012
- Running time: 101 minutes
- Country: Croatia
- Language: Croatian

Lea and Darija (Croatian: Lea i Darija) is a 2012 Croatian biographical film directed by Branko Ivanda. The film is based on the life of Lea Deutsch, a Jewish girl who was a dancing and acting star in Zagreb on the eve of World War II.

== Cast ==
- Klara Naka as Lea Deutsch
- Tamy Zajec as Darija Gasteiger
- Zrinka Cvitešić as Ivka Deutsch
- Linda Begonja as Melita Gasteiger
- Sebastian Cavazza as Stjepan Deutsch
- Vedran Živolić as Tadija Kukic
- Dražen Čuček as Tito Strozzi
- Zijad Gračić as Dušan Žanko
- Goran Grgić as Dubravko Dujšin
- Radovan Ruždjak as Rod Riffler
