= Peter Musevski =

Slovenian actor (1965–2020)

Peter Musevski (12 June 1965 – 18 March 2020) was a Slovenian actor. He was born in 1965 in Ljubljana, Slovenia. He studied drama acting at the Ljubljana Film Academy (AGRFT). He appeared in many award-winning films that received prizes at the world's most eminent festivals.

Musevski died on 18 March 2020, aged 54.

== Selected filmography ==
- 2019: Half-Sister (d. Damjan Kozole)
- 2016: Nightlife (d. Damjan Kozole)
- 2009: Slovenian Girl (d. Damjan Kozole)
- 2008: Forever (d. Damjan Kozole)
- 2007: I’m from Titov Veles (d. Teona Mitevska)
- 2005: Labour Equals Freedom (d. Damjan Kozole)
- 2005: Tuning (d. Igor Šterk)
- 2003: Spare Parts (d. Damjan Kozole)
- 2001: Bread and Milk (d. Jan Cvitkovič)
- 1995: Gone with the Train (d. Igor Šterk)
- 1995: Halgato (d. Andrej Mlakar)
