= List of Billions episodes =

Billions is an American drama television series created by Brian Koppelman, David Levien, and Andrew Ross Sorkin, and starring Paul Giamatti and Damian Lewis, that premiered on Showtime on January 17, 2016.

On May 8, 2019, the series was renewed for a fifth season by Showtime, which premiered on May 3, 2020. Due to the COVID-19 pandemic, production was postponed and only 7 of the 12 episodes aired in 2020. Season 5 resumed on September 5, 2021. On October 1, 2020, Showtime renewed the series for a sixth season, which premiered on January 23, 2022. On February 15, 2022, Showtime renewed the series for a seventh and final season, which premiered on August 11, 2023 on Paramount+ with Showtime, before airing on Showtime two days later.

During the course of the series, 84 episodes of Billions aired over seven seasons, between January 17, 2016, and October 29, 2023.

== Series overview ==
Season	Episodes		Originally released		
Season	Episodes		First released	Last released	Network
1	12		January 17, 2016	April 10, 2016	Showtime
2	12		February 19, 2017	May 7, 2017	Showtime
3	12		March 25, 2018	June 10, 2018	Showtime
4	12		March 17, 2019	June 9, 2019	Showtime
5	12	7	May 3, 2020	June 14, 2020	Showtime
5	12	5	September 5, 2021	October 3, 2021	Showtime
6	12		January 23, 2022	April 10, 2022	Showtime
7 (Note: Episodes were released two days later on Showtime.)	12		August 11, 2023	October 27, 2023	Paramount+ with Showtime

== Episodes ==
=== Season 1 (2016) ===
No. overall	No. in season	Title	Directed by	Written by	Original release date	U.S. viewers (millions)
1	1	"Pilot"	Neil Burger	Brian Koppelman & David Levien & Andrew Ross Sorkin	January 17, 2016	0.904
Bobby "Axe" Axelrod is a charismatic 9/11 survivor who heads up Axe Capital ("Axe Cap"), a hedge fund based in Connecticut. Ari Spyros of the SEC asks Chuck Rhoades, the U.S. Attorney for the Southern District of New York, to investigate him. Because of his philanthropy Axe has public support and is a bit of a folk hero, making Rhoades cautious to take Axe on. In addition, Chuck's wife, Wendy, works as a motivational coach/psychiatrist at Axe Cap, and the prospect of Chuck investigating her boss causes tension between them. Chuck brings up the idea of getting a new job to Wendy, who rebuffs the notion, and the two argue. Chuck confesses that if he brings up a lawsuit against Bobby Axelrod, that there may be a conflict of interest given her employment as Axe Capital's personal psychiatrist. Chuck shares his concerns regarding Axelrod with Bryan Connerty, the Chief Assistant U.S. Attorney. Kate Sacker, an AUSA, informs both Chuck and Bryan that the "Norton Place", a home valued at $83 million is up for sale, and Bobby Axelrod has his sights on it. Chuck decides to bait Axe into buying the house to turn public favor against him. Skip Wolkowski, a friend of Chuck’s father, is being sent to jail by Chuck for insider trading. Chuck Sr. arranges a meeting between Skip and his son, to ask for a more lenient punishment, but Chuck refuses to relent. Meanwhile, Axe realizes that an old friend, Dan Margolis, is cooperating with the FBI. Axe and his fixer, Hall, move to frame another trader, Steven Birch, for Axe's wrongdoing. Axe and Chuck finally meet face-to-face at an investment conference. Axe buys the house, making the front page of the New York Post. Chuck learns that Skip chose to commit suicide rather than go to jail. In front of his staff, Chuck doubles-down on his decision and says that it's important they convict white collar criminals with the same severity they would a petty drug dealer. Bryan shows Chuck the news, confirming Bobby Axelrod's purchase of the Norton Place. Hall calls Axe and informs him that Chuck has opened a case file on him and that it could eventually lead to prosecution.
2	2	"Naming Rights"	Neil Burger	Brian Koppelman & David Levien	January 24, 2016	0.950
The Financial Journal story on Steven Birch is released. Rhoades' office publicly begins investigating Steven Birch's practices. Bobby, aware that he is likely next, fires one of his top traders, Victor Mateo, to make an example of him. Wendy visits Victor, who is furious, and advises him to stand down, pointing out the possible repercussions of trying to fight Axe. Axe meets up with Sean Ayles, the curator of the Ellis Eads Hall. He offers a $100 million donation in exchange of having the hall named after him. Axe mentions the Eads family's financial troubles and asks Sean to convince them to accept his offer of $25 million for the naming rights. While the youngest member of the Eads family extends his gratitude, Axe rebuffs him and focuses on a different family member, Chad Eads. Axe recounts how they met earlier in life at a country club called The Spoon where Axe used to be a caddy during middle school. Axe shares that he worked there during the summers and used to make only $16 during each round of golf. One day, Chad's grandfather Ellis Eads, had missed a shot while Axe was his caddy. Embarrassed, he blamed Axe’s advice and got him fired. As retribution, today Axe offers the family the $25 million, minus the $16 million, leaving the family members with only $9 million to split among themselves. Having no other option, the Eads family silently accept Bobby’s offer, and leave. Hall blackmails Tara Mohr, one of the employees of the US Attorney's office, into being his informant. FBI Agent Terri McCue informs Chuck of proof regarding Steven Birch having committed insider trading, while Tara eavesdrops. Chuck decides to settle with Birch rather than aim for a conviction, so they can return their focus on Axelrod. In a meeting between the team and Steven Birch, Chuck and Bryan offer a plea deal while Tara continues to eavesdrop and inform Hall. The meeting ends with Birch accepting the plea deal.
3	3	"YumTime"	Scott Hornbacher	Willie Reale	January 31, 2016	1.282
June Raichlein, the widow who criticised Lara & Axe during their memorial fund meeting, has just completed a literary work titled "9-12: The Day After." It's a memoir about her life following the death of her husband in the aftermath of the World Trade Center attack. Lara places a call to acquire a copy of June’s book before it is released and finds out that it’s extremely negative towards Bobby. Orrin Bach, Axe's attorney, is uncertain that he can bring a defamation suit as the bulk of what is written about Axe is true. Lara decides to take matters into her own hands. June’s funds quickly dry up, and both her gym and country club membership are cancelled. After her son loses his spot at Stanford, despite strong grades and being a legacy candidate, she realises that Lara is coming after her. Regaining her composure, she meets with Lara at the Axe residence with a "revised" version of her memoir, with the offending parts cut. Lara has June sign a pre-prepared non-disclosure agreement. Bobby acquires a significant percent of the YumTime Bakery and has a sit down with two senior members of the YumTime board, Evelyn Benson and Sherm. The two make it clear that as YumTime belongs to the Bailey Family, that they cannot unseat Hutch Bailey the Third as CEO. Perturbed by Bobby’s approach, Evelyn reaches out to Chuck Sr., her lover and the man who granted her the board member seat at YumTime. Chuck Sr. comes to the conclusion that Axe must be making this play as payback for his son opening a case file on Axe Capital. Axe invites the Chairman, Jerome Purkheiser to the pizzeria and discusses YumTime's future with him. At the next board meeting, Hutch accuses Axe of being a carpetbagger. Jerome puts forth a motion to remove Hutch as CEO, much to the shock of Evelyn and Hutch, and the motion passes. Immediately after, Jerome pushes another motion to dismiss Evelyn so that Bobby Axelrod may assume her seat on the board. The motion passes and Evelyn storms off, same as Hutch. Terri receives a tip regarding a case concerning in the Eastern District a broker by the name of Pete Decker, one of the men connected to Bobby Axelrod. Chuck orders Lonnie Watley to give up a high-profile case he’d been working on to the Eastern District, in exchange for the case regarding Decker. Much to Chuck's distaste, this brings Spyros back to the Southern District. Bryan and Tara lead the arrest on Decker and bring him to Chuck and Spyros. Chuck makes it clear to Decker that his only option is to flip on Axelrod if he wants to be a free man, but Decker refuses. Chuck blackmails him into compliance using his parents' retirement fund, which Decker had expanded using insider information. Later, Chuck Sr. tells Chuck about Axelrod's recent play with YumTime. Chuck says that Bobby’s actions in the regard were legal, and he refuses to act in vengeance in the name of family. However, he later confesses to Wendy that he is upset with how Axe attacked his father.
4	4	"Short Squeeze"	James Foley	Young Il Kim	February 7, 2016	0.851
Axe is awoken in the middle of the night to come to rescue of Mick Danzig, who the police pickup for discharging and automatic weapon while being visibly drunk. Axe steps in and pays a bribe leading to the police charges completely disappearing. At the same time, while dropping Chuck off at work, Wendy notices Pete Decker heading into Chuck's office. She asks Chuck about this, but he refuses to comment. Inside, Decker says that the tip for the Pepsum Pharmaceuticals trade came from "Dollar Bill" Stearn, one of Axe Capital's employees and top performers. Kate catches Tara Mohr texting Hall. Chuck is upset over Tara's betrayal but decides to use it to his advantage, and instructs Tara to arrange an in person meeting with Hall. But Hall, sensing something wrong, never shows up. Axe arranges to take some of his high school buddies (Eric, Ike, and Freddie) with him to Quebec to enjoy an impromptu Metallica concert taking place in Quebec. Chuck Sr. learns that Bobby Axelrod is exposed on a short position with respect to a company called Cross-Co. and decides to go after him. Soon after, Wags gets an alert that the companies are recalling shares to initiate a "buyback". Wags notifies Axe, who recognizes that the timing of it all means a "short-squeeze" and that someone must have discovered their position. Determined to still make this work, Axe makes a deal with Ken Malverne, a rival hedge fund manager. He then has a sudden realization and notifies Hall that it is likely Chuck Sr. putting the squeeze on him, who notifies Spyros. Spyros pulls Chuck and hands him information confirming that his father is guilty of trading on insider information. Chuck confronts his father about the insider trading and forces him to sell at a loss. Axe meets up with his old friend Constantine, who appears to be down on his luck. Afterwards, Freddie approaches Bobby and confesses that he had been eavesdropping all day, and had taken a short position on Cross-Co. He is now losing money, and asks Bobby for help. Upset, Axe protects Freddie, but severs ties with him afterwards. Axe, still tender from Freddie's betrayal, meets up with Wags and tells him to sell everything slowly. Wags questions if Axe is out of the game, but Axe just quietly leaves the office.
5	5	"The Good Life"	Neil LaBute	Heidi Schreck	February 14, 2016	1.010
With Decker's information providing a lead on "Dollar Bill" Stearn, Chuck and his team decide to focus on him. Bryan and Kate find a link between Stearn and Clayton Grunwald, Pepsum Pharmaceuticals' researcher for insider information regarding an experimental product called "Vaccarazine.” The team head to Iowa and interrogate Clayton. Down in Iowa, Chuck meets up with Clayton at his farm. Clayton confesses to meeting Bill. He tells Chuck and his team that his daughter, Christina, needed surgeries and Stearn offered to pay, and so he told Stearn everything he wanted to know about Pepsum Pharmaceuticals. Chuck says he will do everything to help Clayton, and Clayton signs a document confirming that he shared insider information regarding the product with Stearn. Kate learns Bryan is having some money problems when she overhears him on a call about putting a down payment on a place to live. She offers him a loan and to be his guarantor, but Bryan says it'd be against the rules and could cause trouble down the road. Kate says they'll get a waiver and so long as Bryan doesn't default, there shouldn't be any issues. Kate casually brings up his relationship with Terri. Bryan admits that he and Terri are having an affair. Later, while discussing the loan offer, Kate tells Bryan about her dream of becoming POTUS. Following Bobby’s orders from the last episode, Wags confirms with the senior traders that the company is only focused on liquidating at the moment, starting with telecommunications. The traders are dismayed by this news, and as the episode progresses, they fall into disarray. Bryan suggests Axe might be quitting for real, but Chuck laughs it off. Wendy visits Axe’s residence and tells Bobby to talk to his investors himself. Bobby meets Raul Gomez, one of his oldest investors, and promises to find a suitable fund to take over their investment. Chuck is upset upon being told about Wendy’s visit to Axe’s house. Bryan notices his reaction, and questions if Chuck should recuse himself from the case due to the clear “conflict of interest.” Mike Dimonda writes an article on Chuck’s conflict of interest regarding the case, using Lonnie Watley as a source. Bobby receives a news alert that "Mundia-Telecommunication Executives have been indicted." This is the same company that Constantine talked to Axe about during his Metallica trip. The entire telecommunication market is crashing with them as arrests and scandals are stretching across various countries, but Axe Capital was safe. Axe reappears at the office and admits that he did all this to avoid drawing attention. Wags tells Axe that he believed Axe was actually leaving, who admits that he did consider it. Just then, Bryan, Terri, and a team of Feds enter Axe Capital and publicly arrest Bill Stearn in front of the entire company.
6	6	"The Deal"	James Foley	Wes Jones	February 21, 2016	1.172
Wendy asks Chuck to recuse himself from the case. Bryan discovers that Bill has a mistress and second family. Bill accepts the reality of the situation though, and reveals that he was prepared for such a play by Chuck. He sends, via text message, a letter to his wife explaining everything ending his marriage and shocking everyone in the room. Axe suggests they get Lawrence Boyd of Spartan-Ives to say that Axe Capital is a reputable company. Meanwhile, Orrin reports to Axe that Bill didn’t betray him, and asks him to settle. Axe refutes the idea, but is shaken when Lara agrees with Bach's suggestion. He remains firm though, and leaves for the photo-op with Boyd. However, Boyd flakes on Axe, frustrating him. Adam DeGiulio goes to Chuck's office, and states that there is concern they could lose this because of the clear conflict of interest during appeal if Chuck doesn't recuse himself. Eventually, Chuck succumbs and agrees to make a deal, making Bryan furious. Meanwhile, after a conversation with Wendy, Axe decides he will make a deal to save Axe Capital. The deal states that Axelrod will lose his firm, admit guilt, and pay a $1.9 billion fine for the criminal activities. At the plea deal meeting itself, Chuck and Bobby mock each other, and ultimately negotiations break down. Chuck changes the terms of the deal, saying Axe will not be allowed a family office and must agree to a lifetime ban on trading. Axe immediately tears up the $1.9 billion check and throws it in Chuck's face. When Chuck returns to Wendy he lies to her, saying that the deal fell apart because Axe threw a fit. He says that he is officially recusing himself for Wendy's benefit and the case on Axelrod will go on without him. This turns out to be another lie though, as Chuck tells Bryan to keep him informed on all developments, waving off his concerns.
7	7	"The Punch"	Stephen Gyllenhaal	Brian Koppelman & David Levien	March 6, 2016	1.051
One of Axe’s associates, Bruce Layner, drops the Axelrod children home while under influence. The kids mention Bruce had made a lot of negative comments about their families wealth. On hearing about this, Bobby confronts Bruce and promptly knocks the man on the ground. Axe is informed that the police have come into possession of a video recording of the incident and that the authorities plan to arrest Axe soon. Upon realizing that the video is edited, Bobby asks Wags to find the full unedited footage. Over dinner, Bobby asks Dimonda to sit on the story for one day in exchange for a favour. Axe’s team manages to obtain the full video and upload it to YouTube, where it immediately goes viral. At the Axe residence, Lara, Bobby, and Orrin smile as they watch the full video of Bruce getting knocked down, including the motivations behind the punch. Bryan manages to find a lead on Donnie Caan, one of the top traders at Axe Capital, and convinces him to make a deal to be a criminal informant. Donnie is tasked with getting Axe to confirm a source of insider trade information, all while wearing a wire. Chuck invites Spyros to his office and motions the man to a meeting happening in a closed windowed cubicle. Spyros freezes up at the sight of seeing Martina Slovis behind the windows having a discussion with Kate Sacker. Chuck tells Spyros that he was aware that Spyros had raped Martina when they were younger. Chuck tells Spyros he will either fall back in line and Chuck will resume his dominant role in their teamwork or else he will blow up his life using Martina. Afterwards, Chuck questions Bryan about the informant, who fills him in on how they tracked down Donnie Caan. Bryan confronts Chuck and tells him that he no longer wants the Axelrod case if Chuck continues to interfere in it. Later, Bryan and Donnie meet at night, and Donnie gives Bryan something that he claims will make him happy.
8	8	"Boasts and Rails"	John Dahl	Wes Jones	March 13, 2016	1.093
Kate acquires a redacted chapter of June’s memoir, revealing to Chuck that Bobby's 9/11 backstory is a lie. Instead of being in the World Trade Center, Bobby was at his lawyer's office negotiating his severance, as his partners were pushing him out due to suspicions of illegal trades. Their deaths on 9/11 saved his career, allowing him to take over and rebrand the firm. Rather than helping with rescue efforts, Bobby continued trading through the tragedy, amassing millions by the market's reopening. Shocked, Chuck leaks this to reporter Mike Dimonda, who warns him about the risks if it’s false, but Chuck is confident in its truth. When Dimonda confronts Bobby, Bobby struggles to keep his composure. The story soon drops, prompting Lara to pull their kids from school. Bobby, though shaken, decides to increase security at Axe Capital and admits to Wags and Orrin that the story is true, acknowledging he seized a $750 million opportunity amid the disaster. Meanwhile, Hall alerts Bobby to a security breach, leading him to demand an investigation. Dale, listening via Donnie’s wire, hears Chuck advising Bryan to frame a fake mole if necessary, which Bryan hesitantly considers. At Axe Capital, three employees have wiped their drives, including Donnie, raising Bobby's suspicions. Donnie’s nervousness confirms his vulnerability, and Hall ultimately points Bobby to “Pouch” as the supposed mole, whom Bobby fires to cover for Donnie. Bryan later confesses to Chuck that he framed Pouch to protect Donnie. That night, Donnie and Bobby meet, reaffirming their alliance as double agents, secretly working together against Chuck.
9	9	"Where the F*** is Donnie?"	Susanna White	Peter K. Blake	March 20, 2016	1.127
At Lara Axelrod's restaurant, firefighters arrive under the guise of an inspection and sabotage the restaurant in retaliation. Lara and Axe go to the firehouse to present his side of the story in an attempt to control the damage, but he is unsuccessful. Later, several firefighters destroy the restaurant's farm, prompting Lara to decide to sell both the restaurant and the farm. Carly, Channing, and Hlasa, traders at Axe Capital, leave the firm amid the controversy to form their own fund, Ionosphere. Chuck meets with Lonnie Watley and asks him to investigate Judge Whit Wilcox for suspicious activity. At Axe Capital, Connerty and the FBI agents who have wiretapped Donnie Caan hear Axe instruct Donnie to take a large position on a trade. Donnie and Axe enter a room that scrambles the wiretap. Donnie makes the trade and then disappears. Donnie is eventually revealed to be attending a spiritual convention. He is taken into custody and tells Connerty about his conversation with Axe in the room that scrambled the wiretap, revealing that Axe has an insider at the FDA. Donnie then begins coughing up blood and eventually dies.
10	10	"Quality of Life"	Karyn Kusama	Willie Reale	March 27, 2016	1.103
In a flashback, Axe learns that Donnie has pancreatic cancer. After speaking with Axe, Donnie agrees to do risky stuff for him in exchange for Axe providing financial support for his family. Meanwhile, Axe discovers that Ionosphere has been poaching Axe Capital's clients. He attempts to convince the lenders not to do business with Ionosphere, but they refuse to back down. At Dollar Bill Stearn's hearing, with Judge Wilcox presiding, both sides present their cases. Wilcox grants the defense's motion for dismissal, acquitting Dollar Bill. He returns to Axe Capital, where, at Axe's behest they stage a fake fight to make it appear that the two have fallen out. This allows Dollar Bill to join Ionosphere and sabotage its venture. He provides false information, causing them to suffer a heavy loss. Axe then leverages this and makes a deal with them that heavily favors him. Lonnie meets with Chuck and tells him that Wilcox has is a part of an investment group involved in the prison-industrial complex. This leads to the fact that Wilcox's rulings are often harsh in cases involving African-American and Latino defendants, while he is more lenient in white-collar cases. Chuck confronts Wilcox about his activities and threatens to report him to the FBI unless he retires. Wilcox agrees, but at his retirement party he is arrested by the U.S. Attorney's Office for the Eastern District of New York.
11	11	"Magical Thinking"	Anna Boden & Ryan Fleck	Story by : Wes Jones & Heidi Schreck; Teleplay by : Wes Jones	April 3, 2016	1.080
At Axe Capital, on a risky trade that everyone except Axe believes is a loser, Axe refuses to change his position. When the news breaks, Axe is proven wrong, resulting in a heavy loss. Axe has a session with Wendy to understand why his reading of the situation was wrong. They spend most of the night talking, during which Axe lets slip that he bribed police officers in relation to the Mick Danzig incident. Chuck, who believes Wendy will be home, goes looking for her and eventually arrives at Axe Capital, where he sees her talking with Axe. During this moment of weakness, Chuck goes to a BDSM club. While there, he discovers that someone has been following him and taking photographs of him. Wendy later returns home and makes notes about her session with Axe. Chuck arrives while Wendy is out of the room, logs into her laptop, reads her notes and discovers the information about Axe bribing the police. He makes a copy of the notes secretly. Chuck meets with Adam DeGiulio, a DOJ adviser, to offer him a federal judgeship that became vacant following Wilcox's removal. Chuck promises to guarantee his appointment in exchange for DeGiulio maintaining a friendly connection inside the DOJ. Chuck then meets with his father and asks him to help secure DeGiulio's appointment.
12	12	"The Conversation"	Michael Cuesta	Brian Koppelman & David Levien	April 10, 2016	1.013
Lonnie Watley returns to the Southern District, where Chuck tasks him with finding evidence of the bribe Axe paid to the police. Watley interviews police personnel connected to the incident involving Axe's bribe and eventually traces the money. Axe is informed by Raul Gomez that there is an investigation into the bribery and gun discharge. Axe confronts Wendy about the leak, but she denies being responsible. Lara and Axe prepare a contingency plan to leave the country should a warrant or other legal action against Axe materialize. Wendy realizes that Chuck broke into her computer and confronts him about it. They argue and fight, with Wendy kicking Chuck out of their home. The following morning, Chuck terminates the investigation. Wendy goes to Axe Capital to speak with Axe and plays a recording of her conversation with Chuck, in which Chuck admits to stealing her confidential notes, proving her innocence. Axe gives her a $5 million bonus and offers to pay her more for the recording, but Wendy deletes it and quits. Connerty meets with Bach, who is subsequently approached by Axe, who offers him a job which he turns down. Chuck tasks Kate Sacker believing there is a mole within the office. She discovers and informs him and rather than confront them, Chuck pretends that he has planted bugs throughout Axe Capital. The information eventually reaches Axe, who becomes enraged and has the entire office torn apart. After the teardown reveals no bugs, Chuck meets with Axe, and the two face off in an argument.

=== Season 2 (2017) ===
No. overall	No. in season	Title	Directed by	Written by	Original release date	U.S. viewers (millions)
13	1	"Risk Management"	Reed Morano	Brian Koppelman & David Levien	February 10, 2017 (online); February 19, 2017 (Showtime)	0.753
Oliver Dake of the OPR is sent by the attorney general to investigate Chuck Rhoades' conduct at the SDNY, particularly his handling of the aborted bribery case against Bobby Axelrod. When word of the investigation reaches Axelrod, he responds by increasing pressure on Chuck, financing 127 lawsuits against him, including a class-action Bivens claim alleging violations of Chuck's Fourth Amendment rights against unreasonable searches. After three months of hiatus, employees return to Axe Capital under stricter security measures. Axe appoints Stephanie Reed as his chief of staff, requiring her to be present during his conversations to ensure compliance with the new rules. Wendy Rhoades works as a freelance performance coach after leaving Axe Capital and establishes her own practice. Axe meets with her and attempts to convince her to return to the firm, but Wendy declines. Dake interviews Connerty and confronts him about his private meeting with Axelrod. Connerty had already reported the meeting, but Dake pressures him to turn against Chuck, without success. Dake later confronts Connerty about the tip that led to the investigation, noting that it came from the location where Connerty had met with Axe and Bach. Connerty neither confirms nor denies that he made the call. While investigating the case, Dake discovers Wendy's finances and the $5 million payment from Axe. He confronts Chuck with the fact that the payment to Wendy occurred on the day the bribery case was dropped, which Chuck did not know about. Chuck, now separated from Wendy, confronts her about the payment, and they argue. Mafee hires Taylor Mason as an analyst intern, who quickly proves useful to him.
14	2	"Dead Cat Bounce"	Ryan Fleck & Anna Boden	Wes Jones	February 26, 2017	0.512
Chuck hires his friend and fellow lawyer Ira Schirmer to represent him against the lawsuits. With Chuck scheduled to meet with the attorney general to discuss his future, he tasks Connerty, Sacker, and Lonnie with finding a case that is nearly impossible to lose in an effort to make himself indispensable to the office. They present several cases, but none are suitable until Sacker proposes investigating Spartan Ives, an investment bank involved in illegal activity whose CEO, Lawrence Boyd, is a close friend of the attorney general. Lonnie gives Sacker a set of whistleblower emails concerning the retail giant Goodstop. Although the case is strong, it does not sway the attorney general. Chuck instead plants the impression that he is not investigating Spartan Ives, causing speculation within the office. When Chuck meets with the attorney general, she decides not to fire him because doing so could lead to speculation about obstruction of justice, but warns him that he is on a short leash and that his position now depends on successfully prosecuting Spartan Ives. Axe tasks Mafee and Taylor with finding a weakness in rival hedge fund manager Todd Krakow's investments. Axe shorts the stock and makes a large profit. Impressed by Taylor's abilities, Axe convinces her to stay at Axe Capital after her internship. Charles Rhoades Sr. speaks with Wendy and realizes that she and Chuck have separated. He attempts to convince her to reconcile with Chuck but is unsuccessful. Chuck and Wendy attend couples therapy, where Wendy tells Chuck that Dake is meeting with her later. She asks whether she should do anything to help him, but Chuck tells her that she does not have to lie for him. During her meeting with Dake, Wendy says the $5 million payment was her bonus and not a bribe related to the dismissal of the case against Axe. Dake meets with Axe and questions him about the payment to Wendy. Dake offers him immunity from prosecution if he admits that the payment was a bribe. Lawrence Boyd meets with Axe and joins forces with him to bring down Chuck Rhoades. Axe Capital hires Dr. Gus as a performance coach to fill Wendy's former position.
15	3	"Optimal Play"	Alex Gibney	Willie Reale	March 5, 2017	0.851
Axe considers buying an NFL team, but the league appears unwilling to allow him to bid because of his public perception. Taylor is selected to participate in the Alpha Cup, a Wall Street charity poker tournament in which hedge funds and investment banks compete against each other. Although initially resistant, Taylor agrees to participate. Todd Krakow asks Wendy to coach him for the tournament, and she agrees. At the tournament, Axe loses to Todd, leaving only Taylor to face him in the final round. Todd attempts to throw Taylor off her game but becomes overconfident. Taylor defeats him and wins the tournament. The SDNY discovers a flight attendant named Michaela, who works on Lawrence Boyd's private jet and made a profitable trade based on information about an upcoming merger. Connerty convinces her to spy for the office. During a flight, she records a compromising video of Boyd with Shayleen McKinnon, the wife of Tom McKinnon, a managing director at Spartan Ives. The SDNY uses the video to pressure McKinnon into becoming an inside source. Chuck experiences financial difficulties following his separation from Wendy, forcing him to live at the Yale Club while also paying legal fees from the lawsuits. To stay afloat, he sells his prized collection of Winston Churchill's World War II book series. Axe, who has been having Chuck followed, purchases the collection. Lara and her cousin Mo partner to start a business providing IV treatments intended to cure hangovers.
16	4	"The Oath"	Noah Emmerich	Adam R. Perlman	March 12, 2017	0.981
Wendy consults for Fairpoint, an aerospace company run by Craig Heidecker whose latest project aims to send a crewed mission to Mars. She is tasked with determining whether pilot Elena Gabriel is fit for the mission. After speaking with Elena, Wendy tells Craig that she is unfit for the mission. Axe meets with philanthropist Sanford Bensinger under the pretense of signing onto the Giving Oath Foundation, but uses the meeting as a photo opportunity to improve his public image ahead of his NFL bid. Lara and Mo encounter Mercy Squad, a competing IV service run by private equity investor Dan Wolfe, which has greater financial backing and undercuts their business. Lara arranges for Wolfe to be arrested for aggravated pimping. The SDNY's investigation into Lawrence Boyd has stalled because the alleged crimes have stopped during the investigation. Chuck orders a search warrant against Spartan Ives for quote stuffing, despite the risks posed by the complexity of the case and the difficulty of explaining it to a jury. He instead uses the warrant as a means of meeting with Boyd, and the two reach a deal in which Boyd provides several employees who are noncompliant in exchange for Chuck ending the investigation into him. Tom McKinnon later informs them that Spartan Ives has resumed its illicit dealings now that the investigation is over. Chuck also obtains a flash drive from his father containing a video of Dake confronting Connerty about calling in the tip that led to the investigation. Axe meets with Marco Capparello, a member of the Sandicot city council, who proposes that Axe buy the town's debt because Sandicot is on course to receive a casino license. Axe agrees to invest. At Axe Capital, Chuck and his legal team depose Axe as part of the lawsuits against him. Axe initially struggles to establish damages caused by Chuck, but during a break, he learns that the NFL has rejected his bid and uses the decision as evidence of damages caused by Chuck's actions.
17	5	"Currency"	Steph Green	Brian Chamberlayne	March 19, 2017	0.857
As Axe faces the possibility of Axe Capital experiencing its first-ever down quarter due to the collapse of a tech investment in Sansomic, Axe demands that his team devise a groundbreaking strategy to reverse their fortunes. Mafee introduces a potential solution involving Everett "Eveready" Wright, a currency trader who possesses insider information suggesting an imminent devaluation of the Nigerian naira. Axe sees an opportunity to profit by shorting the currency but recognizes the need for substantial backing to influence the market effectively. Axe convenes a meeting with fellow hedge fund managers Todd Krakow, Ken Malverne, and Steven Birch to collaborate on the Nigerian currency play. While Krakow and Malverne agree to participate, Birch, harboring resentment from past dealings with Axe, betrays the plan by leaking information, causing the Nigerian government to take countermeasures that jeopardize the strategy. To salvage the situation, Axe enlists Lawrence Boyd, a respected economist, to publicly advocate for the devaluation of the naira, aiming to sway market sentiment back in their favor. Wags returns to Axe Capital after undergoing therapy with Wendy Rhoades. Feeling sidelined by the appointment of Stephanie as chief of staff, Wags contemplates leaving the firm. However, Axe, reaffirming Wags' indispensable role, fires Stephanie and convinces Wags to stay, restoring their professional partnership. Chuck intensifies his efforts against Lawrence Boyd. Tom McKinnon gathers incriminating evidence during a dinner meeting, where Boyd admits to illegal activities, providing Chuck with the necessary leverage. As Axe and Boyd prepare for a televised appearance to discuss the Nigerian currency, Axe receives word of an impending arrest warrant for Boyd. Choosing not to inform him, Axe allows the broadcast to proceed, during which Boyd endorses the devaluation strategy. Immediately after, federal agents arrest Boyd, marking a significant victory for Chuck and a monetary win for Axe.
18	6	"Indian Four"	Adam Arkin	Alice O'Neill	March 26, 2017	0.922
Wendy meets with Ira Schirmer to find out the extent of Chuck's situation, which is bleak. The following day, she meets with Axe and proposes returning to Axe Capital in exchange for him dropping the civil lawsuits against Chuck. She also assures Axe that she will not be compromised. Wendy later realizes that Axe may have manipulated her and confronts him. Axe admits that he had anticipated the situation, prompting Wendy to decide that she and Axe will no longer have sessions. After Wendy returns to Axe Capital, Axe drops the lawsuits. On a date, Axe tells Lara about bringing Wendy back, attempting to make it appear that he is seeking her permission even though he has already brought Wendy back. Lara becomes upset and leaves. They later reconcile, with Axe lying to Lara and telling her that he decided not to have sessions with Wendy. Charles Rhoades Sr. learns that Sandicot is in line for a casino license and that Axelrod's people have been making frequent trips there. He connects the two and contacts his friend, "Black" Jack Foley, an old-money political kingmaker, to have the gaming commission award the license to another location instead. Axe takes a large position in Sandicot, buying up properties, but encounters a landowner who refuses his offer. Axe personally approaches him and makes a larger offer, which he accepts. Axe later learns that the gaming commission has awarded the casino license to another location instead of Sandicot. Lawrence Boyd is released on bail and, having previously been uncooperative with Axe's plan, begins cooperating. At his trial, Boyd realizes that the jury is not swaying in his favor and decides to pursue a deal, but Chuck refuses to agree to one. Chuck receives a call from the attorney general, and they reach an agreement in which she agrees not to pursue action against Chuck, allowing him to accept a deal from Boyd. Dake's interview with Lonnie Watley is interrupted by a call from the attorney general instructing him to cease his investigation, which he does. Chuck is also informed by Ira that all of the lawsuits against him have been dropped, but realizes that Wendy may have played a part in this and confronts her.
19	7	"Victory Lap"	John Singleton	Brian Koppelman & David Levien & Alice O'Neill	April 2, 2017	0.903
Bryan Connerty admits to Chuck Rhoades that he was the one who called the Office of Professional Responsibility (OPR) on Rhoades.
20	8	"The Kingmaker"	Oliver Hirschbiegel	Adam R. Perlman	April 9, 2017	1.029
Chuck Rhoades forms an alliance with the "kingmaker" Jack Foley in order to run for the governorship of the state of New York.
21	9	"Sic Transit Imperium"	Colin Bucksey	Wes Jones	April 16, 2017	0.847
Chuck Rhoades angles to become governor of New York state.
22	10	"With or Without You"	Ed Bianchi	Willie Reale	April 23, 2017	0.912
23	11	"Golden Frog Time"	Karyn Kusama	Story by : Brian Koppelman & David Levien & Brian Chamberlayne; Teleplay by : Brian Koppelman & David Levien	April 30, 2017	0.974
Chuck Rhoades sets up a sting operation to catch Bobby Axelrod manipulating a stock IPO. Chuck loses all his trust fund in doing so, compromising both himself and his father.
24	12	"Ball in Hand"	Ryan Fleck & Anna Boden	Brian Koppelman & David Levien & Adam R. Perlman	May 7, 2017	1.019
Chuck Rhoades arranges for Bobby Axelrod to be arrested by the Eastern District on condition that his illegal setting up of Axelrod be hidden forever. Connerty goes to Eastern District to prosecute the case against Axelrod. Sacker gets Head of Crim in Southern District under Rhoades. Lonnie leaves the U.S. Attorney’s office. Bobby, on bail, leaves lock up to find no one waiting for him and goes home. Lara and boys are playing a board game in the house. Chuck walks up the stairs to their house hand in hand with Wendy. Season end on a triple tease: What happens with Bobby and Lara; How long can Chuck stand knowing that Wendy went into a hotel with a presumed lover; What happens with the prosecution of Bobby?

=== Season 3 (2018) ===
No. overall	No. in season	Title	Directed by	Written by	Original release date	U.S. viewers (millions)
25	1	"Tie Goes to the Runner"	Colin Bucksey	Brian Koppelman & David Levien	March 25, 2018	0.928
Chuck meets the new U.S. Attorney General, who informs him of his policy to lay off Wall Street crime. Chuck relents and informs Sacker, the new Chief of Crim. Axe is out of prison, but is separated from Lara. Dake, now U.S. Attorney of the Eastern District, is prosecuting the case with Connerty, and have frozen all of Axe's capital, which leaves Taylor, now chief investment officer of Axe Capital in a bad position. Taylor informs all the employees that they must come up with ideas for an "idea meeting" where the top hedge fund managers meet to discuss strategy, and Axe needs an idea to dazzle them all. Spyros is the new Head of Compliance at Axe Capital. Lara comes in with Steven Birch to check on the assets at Axe Capital, leaving Axe frustrated at the state of his marriage. To unfreeze Axe's capital, he must give up his licence to trade, temporarily, an idea he's very uncomfortable with, as he doesn't know where that puts him regarding the firm. He eventually relents, just as Taylor realizes a good play regarding smart chip technology, and subs in for Axe at the idea's dinner. Chuck's friendship with Ira falls apart, as Ira informs him he'll never speak to him again. Chuck also sours his relationship with his father, Rhoades Sr., who tries to get Jack Foley to back someone else for Governor, but fails. Chuck gives an IOU to Dake in exchange for Dake's exclusion of Wendy in the discovery of trades regarding Ice Juice. Lara informs Axe she won't be coming after the money, but warns him not to lose it.
26	2	"The Wrong Maria Gonzalez"	Noah Emmerich	Adam R. Perlman	April 1, 2018	0.839
With Axe's license to trade suspended, he tries to find creative ways to do so anyway, by contacting previous employees with their own shops. Dake and Connerty get a judge known for favouring the free market, and Chuck can't risk the case like this and pulls in favours in order to get the judge changed. Meanwhile, due to a freak Tsunami in Brazil, Axe's investments are looking down for the day, something Taylor can't have, seeing as Axe has already cordoned off $2 billion, a move seen as lack of confidence in Taylor, but Wags sees through it as a way for Axe to be able to trade by proxy. Meanwhile, Connerty is having his own issues as after confronting Victor Mateo's maid, Maria Gonzalez, who spiked her Ice Juice and drank it on video, Victor realizes she's been compromised, and Axe directs the new replacements for Hall to get rid of her, by having her arrested by ICE, and expediting her deportation. The new AG is not sympathetic to Dake's issues, and refuses to help. Taylor gains the confidence to make a risky play, which Axe respects, and concedes the $2 billion to their control, which they then inform Axe that they'll give to certain outside investors, allowing Axe to trade using them anyway.
27	3	"A Generation Too Late"	Colin Bucksey	Wes Taylor	April 8, 2018	0.849
Axe approaches Ira, now broke and humiliated, with an offer that if he testifies against Chuck and drop the civil suits, he'll pay him $30 million. After initially refusing, Ira, having to deal with the shame of having to postpone proposing to his girlfriend, accepts the deal. In a meeting to inform Connerty and Dake of his change of heart, he half-blurts out that Chuck and his father are involved as well, before being interrupted by Dake. An argument ensues between Dake and Connerty, with Connerty wanting to know why Dake is trying to cover for Chuck. Meanwhile, Taylor has decided to hire Quant traders at the firm, a decision everyone wrestles with, as they see themselves being slowly pushed out. After several interviews with prominent quants, Taylor realizes that even Wags has been plotting against them by planting a quant whose algorithm merely gave data to support any trades done, to avoid any suspicion of insider trading. Taylor realizes that finding a quant won't do, and decides to create one from within Axe Capital, one that they will oversee. Axe makes a visit to failed hedge fund manager, Michael Panay, and convinces him to be his proxy trader, and sets him up with his oldest client, the NYPD's pension-fund manager, who gets a cut from the trade.
28	4	"Hell of a Ride"	John Dahl	Randall Green	April 15, 2018	0.722
29	5	"Flaw in the Death Star"	Matt Shakman	Willie Reale & Adam R. Perlman	April 22, 2018	0.874
30	6	"The Third Ortolan"	John Dahl	Alice O'Neill	April 29, 2018	0.773
31	7	"Not You, Mr. Dake"	Michael Morris	Brian Koppelman & David Levien	May 6, 2018	0.984
32	8	"All the Wilburys"	Mike Binder	Story by : Randall Green & Alice O'Neill; Teleplay by : Brian Koppelman & David Levien	May 13, 2018	0.965
33	9	"Icebreaker"	Stacie Passon	Adam R. Perlman & Willie Reale	May 20, 2018	0.952
Bobby Axelrod gets new info of Grigor Andolov's past dealings. In the office, someone steals Dollar Bill's lucky dollar attached to his trading desk ahead of comp. Kate is having conscience problems as she is being forced to prosecute an innocent man. Axe asks Spartan-Ives for help in his capital raise. Taylor shares an investment plan with Grigor's assistant and purposefully tanks the meeting. Grigor agrees to invest in Axe Cap if Axe can give him an in-person meeting with the Secretary of the Treasury, Todd Krakow. Meanwhile, Connerty gets a job in the FBI after being fired by Chuck. After meeting with the Secretary of the Treasury Grigor tries to force Krakow to give in to him before Axe intervenes. Wags finally catches Rudy as the one who stole Dollar Bill's lucky dollar. Axe talks with Wendy and confronts her about the guilt that she's lately feeling regarding the money she earns, which has caused her to sell her Maserati and start donating to charity. Axe tells her an incident that happened more than a decade ago, which caused his guilt about earning a lot of money to go away. In the end, Grigor visits Axe Cap to sign the deal and tells Axe a story followed by a question that Axe does not know the answer to.
34	10	"Redemption"	Jake Polonsky	Brian Koppelman & David Levien & Matt Fennell	May 27, 2018	0.775
35	11	"Kompenso"	Jessica Yu	Adam R. Perlman	June 3, 2018	0.900
Axe determines his employees' worth at the year-end "comp" meetings, at the dismay of Taylor. Chuck advances his plan against Jock by building a case with the Attorney General of New York, Alvin Epstein. Chuck helps rebuild his relationship with Ira by moving against his unfaithful wife by securing his friend's financial and married life. Taylor and Axe argue over Taylor's place and worth at the firm, further alienating Taylor from Axe Capital.
36	12	"Elmsley Count"	Colin Bucksey	Brian Koppelman & David Levien	June 10, 2018	0.938
Axe dominates a capital raise event, but is betrayed by Taylor, who takes most of the pledges for themself after secretly building the foundations of their own investment firm. Taylor approaches Wendy to jump ship, but she remains loyal to Axe. Chuck looks to strike the final blow against Jock, but is betrayed by Sacker and Epstein. It is revealed that Connerty and Dake decided to expose Chuck's plan to Jock. Chuck is fired and Connerty replaces him. The episode ends with Chuck, Axe, and Wendy sitting at the dinner table at the Rhodes residence, plotting their revenge against Jock and Taylor.

=== Season 4 (2019) ===
No. overall	No. in season	Title	Directed by	Written by	Original release date	U.S. viewers (millions)
37	1	"Chucky Rhoades's Greatest Game"	Colin Bucksey	Brian Koppelman & David Levien	March 17, 2019	0.843
Chuck, now stripped of office is a private attorney. A referred client gives a difficult ask - a Handgun Carry Permit. Chuck uses his connections to ultimately succeed after a laundry list of interrelated favors for several influential people. Wags meets and discusses /business/ with Middle Eastern investors, eventually going to meet The Sheikh at the Embassy. Wags is instead drugged and thrown into a holding room. (/xxx/ = expand) Brian Connerty is given Chuck's old position of United States Attorney for the Southern District thanks to Jock Jeffcoat, who now expects Brian's tutelage in return. Brian begins to review Chuck's cases to expose misconduct and wrongdoing. Taylor is on their own albeit with Axe as a new enemy. They mantain a small executive group with a small number of traders, trying to recruit talent. A paid mole recruiter working for Axe diverts all the talent. Taylor also meets with the Middle East investors, wearing a wig and makeup to satisfy the traditional standards of the Middle East. Taylor passes Wags on his way out who sees them gendered as a feminine women, later reported to Axe. Axe consults Hall about Wags' disappearance. After a tense hold-and-waiting period tied with sovereign red tape Axe is granted access to the Embassy to talk to The Sheikh and find Wags. He is directed to a room expected to be The Sheikh, but instead finds Grigor Andolov. Grigor reveals vested business interests including oil with the Middle East, and The Sheikh. He warns Axe to not continue attacking Taylor, who manages Grigor's money. The two have an understanding and Axe gratefully reunites with Wags.
38	2	"Arousal Template"	Adam Bernstein	Adam R. Perlman	March 24, 2019	0.790
39	3	"Chickentown"	Neil Burger	Lenore Zion	March 31, 2019	0.824
40	4	"Overton Window"	Clement Virgo	Brian Koppelman & David Levien	April 7, 2019	0.886
41	5	"A Proper Sendoff"	Matthew McLoota	Michael Russell Gunn	April 14, 2019	0.751
42	6	"Maximum Recreational Depth"	Jessica Yu	Adam R. Perlman	April 21, 2019	0.680
43	7	"Infinite Game"	Laurie Collyer	Brian Koppelman & David Levien	April 28, 2019	0.741
44	8	"Fight Night"	Colin Bucksey	Story by : Lenore Zion; Teleplay by : Alice O'Neill	May 5, 2019	0.761
45	9	"American Champion"	Naomi Geraghty	Adam R. Perlman	May 12, 2019	0.678
46	10	"New Year's Day"	Adam Bernstein	Brian Koppelman & David Levien	May 26, 2019	0.729
47	11	"Lamster"	Matthew McLoota	Adam R. Perlman	June 2, 2019	0.782
48	12	"Extreme Sandbox"	Colin Bucksey	Brian Koppelman & David Levien	June 9, 2019	0.793

=== Season 5 (2020–21) ===
No. overall	No. in season	Title	Directed by	Written by	Original release date	U.S. viewers (millions)
Part 1
49	1	"The New Decas"	Matthew McLoota	Brian Koppelman & David Levien	May 3, 2020	0.610
Taylor returns to Axe Capital, but Chuck has asked them to spy on Axe for him. The Axe Capital employees struggle with integrating with their new coworkers. Chuck Sr. is getting remarried. Chuck and Wendy are fighting, which is only exacerbated by Chuck disappearing after the wedding while their son, Kevin, drank too much. Wendy announces that she and Chuck will be separating, and Taylor informs Axe that they have been asked to work for Chuck. Chuck leads an investigation against cryptocurrency miners that are funded by Axe, but they refuse to turn on their investor. Axe asks Chuck to end the investigation. Axe and Wags meet with a shaman for a spiritual retreat, and then are invited to participate in a photo shoot for Vanity Fair. Axe is annoyed to see Mike Prince, another deca-billionaire hedge fund mogul, who antagonizes him, and then is selected for the cover of the magazine.
50	2	"The Chris Rock Test"	Lee Tamahori	Adam R. Perlman	May 10, 2020	0.633
Axe goes to a financial retreat "the mike,” hosted by Mike Prince and is one of the keynote speakers. Axe is embarrassed by Mike, who reminds him that he comes from a privileged background. Chuck meets with a therapist and decides to file a restraining order on Wendy to keep her from moving into a new apartment. Axe meets with the Manhattan District Attorney and convinces her to usurp Chuck's position on the cryptocurrency investigation. Wags meets with pharmaceutical companies to allow them to invest in upcoming drugs, but is discouraged. Axe decides to open a bank.
51	3	"Beg, Bribe, Bully"	John Dahl	Ben Mezrich	May 17, 2020	0.568
Axe's son gets in trouble at boarding school when he disrupts the local power grid while trying to set up a cryptocurrency mining farm. Taylor tries to divest some of their investors' money away from fossil fuel companies, but is met with resistance from their staff. Axe is informed that he will not be able to start a federal bank, and he attempts to sponsor Nico, a popular artist. Axe blackmails his son's school headmaster to allow his son to stay enrolled. Upon his return, Axe sets up a partnership with several oil companies, causing Taylor to feel that they have lost control and autonomy following the merger. Chuck joins his alma mater, Yale Law School, as a professor.
52	4	"Opportunity Zone"	Laurie Collyer	Brian Koppelman & David Levien & Emily Hornsby	May 24, 2020	0.625
Axe attempts to regain popularity by launching a campaign to revitalize Yonkers, New York, but is met with competition from Prince. Chuck convinces his father to also create a proposition for Yonkers revitalization to defeat Axe's efforts. Axe and Taylor have a disagreement over the decision to invest in fossil fuel industries while Taylor's organization within Axe Capital is attempting to divest itself from fossil fuels. Chuck begins teaching at Yale Law School, and while his stern methods are initially resisted, they are later accepted. Axe receives a call from Mike Prince, who comments that he will never leave Yonkers, causing Axe to decide against a planned dinner with the family living in his childhood home.
53	5	"Contract"	Adam Bernstein	Theo Travers	May 31, 2020	0.519
Axe faced a public relations issue when the family in his childhood home speak with a reporter about him cancelling his meeting with them. Charles Sr. goes into renal failure, and needs a kidney transplant. Wendy spends time with Nico after he begins painting. Chuck begins dating Catherine Brant, a sociology professor at Yale. Axe visits his mother, and becomes enraged when he finds that she has been in contact with his father. Axe buys his childhood home and helps the family move out; he invites Wendy over and recounts the physical abuse he and his mother suffered from his father.
54	6	"The Nordic Model"	Shaz Bennett	Story by : Adam R. Perlman & Stephanie Mickus; Teleplay by : Adam R. Perlman & Eli Attie	June 7, 2020	0.647
Axe continues to struggle with starting his bank, Wendy and Taylor discuss how to get Bobby what he needs. Chuck pursues Axe for tax fraud concerning his art stash after a raid is conducted, and learns he's not a match for his father's needed transplant. Nico is tasked with a job to help solve the art issue. Axe enjoys his new museum.
55	7	"The Limitless Shit"	David Costabile	Brian Koppelman & David Levien & Emily Hornsby	June 14, 2020	0.660
Axe makes big plays with an unconventional source of inspiration. Chuck goes to desperate lengths for family. Tensions rise in Wendy’s relationships. Chuck and Sacker manipulate a past collaborator. Taylor steps up and takes charge.
Part 2
56	8	"Copenhagen"	Matthew McLoota	Adam R. Perlman	September 5, 2021	0.192
Axe sends Wags to dig up dirt on Prince, discovering a weakness that could wreck Prince’s ambitions. A visit to Axe Cap puts Wendy and Tanner at odds. Chuck looks for alternative methods to save his father, but an old mistake threatens to sidetrack him.
57	9	"Implosion"	Neil Burger	Beth Schacter	September 12, 2021	0.392
As Prince spirals in the wake of a scandal, Axe looks to take his attack to the next level, putting Taylor’s business in the crossfire. Chuck reckons with his father’s mortality. Wendy worries the money may be getting to Tanner.
58	10	"Liberty"	Neil Burger	Brian Koppelman & David Levien & Emily Hornsby	September 19, 2021	0.318
As Axe Cap returns to the office, Axe makes a surprise announcement. Wendy’s divorce becomes complicated when Chuck sticks his nose in the Mase Carb financials. Meanwhile, Axe rings an unexpected ally to get intel on Chuck.
59	11	"Victory Smoke"	Dan Attias	Adam R. Perlman	September 26, 2021	0.331
With victory in sight for his bank, Axe plots to secure his deposits by poaching from Prince. Chuck, Prince and Sacker wrestle with the personal cost of their plan. Taylor looks to enlist an old foe. Wags prepares for a big day.
60	12	"No Direction Home"	Dan Attias	Brian Koppelman & David Levien	October 3, 2021	0.394
Chuck finally catches Axe on an illegal cannabis banking deal. Axe prepares to run with an indictment pending, and Wendy asks him to stay and fight but he refuses. Axe is forced to accept Prince’s offer to buy his company on steep discount before his assets are frozen. Axe is a no-show for his surrender and ends up in Switzerland.

=== Season 6 (2022) ===
No. overall	No. in season	Title	Directed by	Written by	Original release date	U.S. viewers (millions)
61	1	"Cannonade"	Joshua Marston	Brian Koppelman & David Levien	January 23, 2022	0.321
Chuck is living on a farm and dealing with a noisy neighbor who fires antique cannons daily. Prince tries to get what was Axe Capital back on track and decides to conduct business an entirely different way.
62	2	"Lyin' Eyes"	Joshua Marston	Emily Hornsby	January 30, 2022	0.330
Chuck realizes that his bigger goal is to target all of the billionaires of New York state. To do so, he takes up the cause on behalf of city doormen. Chuck convinces the Doors and Custodial union that he can bargain for 5%, instead of 2%. Alongside the head of the union, Duilio Santuli, he bargains with a group of billionaires but fails, as a result of billionaire Bud Lazarra disagreeing with the pay raise. Chuck convinces the union to go on strike, which is shortly cancelled due to Lazarra's influence. He then visits Lazarra again, having collected evidence that Lazarra bribed Santuli and threatens to expose his bribery should he not agree to the 5% raise. Lazarra reluctantly agrees, and Chuck gives the story to the reporters in a bid to instill fear. Prince makes a short play on a sport apparel company his ex-wife is involved with, known as Rask. Prince Cap gains information on Rask using slave labor in their factories and leaks the information. Wags tries to stop the short early on account of him being friends with the CEO, Stuart Rask. Rask's stock begins to rebound, so Rian tries to perform a few more ambitious stock plays, explicitly disobeying Taylor's orders. Taylor considers firing Rian for this, but leaves her with a warning that they will no longer protect any new plays against their orders. Prince gets wind of Wags' actions as Rask's stock rebounds and has Wags try to undo the situation. In doing so, Wags exposes Rask for having ties to North Korea and severs his friendship with Stuart Rask. Prince's ex-wife, Andy Salter, confronts him for trying to take down Rask as a play to fix their strained relationship. He explains that this is part of a larger plan where he aims to rebuild New York City from the ground up by 2028, for the Olympics.
63	3	"STD"	Chloe Domont	Theo Travers	February 6, 2022	0.315
64	4	"Burn Rate"	Chloe Domont	Brian Koppelman & David Levien & Lio Sigerson	February 13, 2022	0.219
65	5	"Rock of Eye"	Tara Nicole Weyr	Eli Attie	February 20, 2022	0.374
66	6	"Hostis Humani Generis"	Tara Nicole Weyr	Beth Schacter	February 27, 2022	0.338
67	7	"Napoleon's Hat"	Shaz Bennett	Emily Hornsby	March 6, 2022	0.374
68	8	"The Big Ugly"	Sylvain White	Brian Koppelman & David Levien & Lio Sigerson	March 13, 2022	0.326
69	9	"Hindenburg"	Dan Attias	Theo Travers	March 20, 2022	0.310
70	10	"Johnny Favorite"	Adam Bernstein	Beth Schacter & Emily Hornsby	March 27, 2022	0.300
71	11	"Succession"	Darren Grant	Brian Koppelman & David Levien & Eli Attie	April 3, 2022	0.319
72	12	"Cold Storage"	Adam Bernstein	Brian Koppelman & David Levien & Beth Schacter	April 10, 2022	0.322

=== Season 7 (2023) ===
No. overall	No. in season	Title	Directed by	Written by	Original release date	U.S. viewers (millions)
73	1	"Tower of London"	Darren Grant	Brian Koppelman & David Levien	August 11, 2023	0.226
Dave plans to use her indictment of Chuck to gain access to employees of Michael Prince and build a criminal case against him, however, Chuck dislikes not knowing her plans and other restrictions and plants a news story that portrays him as a heroic crusader for the common man stopped by a corrupt system. Michael puts Taylor and Phillip in charge of Michael Prince Capital to prepare for his 2024 presidential run, and they bring Dollar Bill back as a portfolio manager. Concerned that Prince will be a despot if elected president, Wendy, Taylor, and Wags meet with Axe to enlist his aid in stopping Michael.
74	2	"Original Sin"	John Dahl	Emily Hornsby	August 18, 2023	0.186
Wendy, Taylor and Wags meet with Bobby Axelrod to try to convince him to help them stop Mike Prince's presidential run. However, Bobby refuses and suggests that instead they join him to create a new investment firm in Europe. They refuse and return to the United States. By giving him a new pair of cowboy boots, Chuck convinces the incarcerated former attorney general, Jock Jeffcoat, to record a video saying he wrongfully fired Chuck. This, along with Chuck's successful media campaign, convinces the President to reinstate him as the United States Attorney for SDNY. Michael Prince tries to convince Bradford Luke, a political consultant, to manage his campaign and Bradford asks for details of Prince's personal life and marriage. Bradford also advises Prince to boost his political chances by making extremely profitable but ethical investments. Victor finds such an investment in a telehealth company, but Bradford warns him of an imminent lawsuit and Victor has to blackmail a doctor to avoid a scandal for Prince.
75	3	"Winston Dick Energy"	Darren Grant	Mae Smith	August 25, 2023	0.234
Chuck lacks the confidence to try new cases until he gets a pep talk from Kareem Abdul Jabbar and accepts a case proposed by his employee, Amanda Torre. Chuck also begins prosecuting a case related to a Michael Prince super PAC, although he knows it's a trap set by Prince. Wendy finds out that the employees of Michael Prince Capital have been seeing another psychiatrist, Dr. Mayer, and begins seeing her for therapy herself. Winston quits Michael Prince Capital and begins marketing stock trading software to other investment firms. Wags, who has been doubting himself since colleagues mocked him for working for a politician now, blackmails Winston into signing over the software to Prince Capital.
76	4	"Hurricane Rosie"	John Dahl	Lio Sigerson	September 1, 2023	0.205
Wendy and Wags individually attempt to damage Michael Prince's presidential campaign. Wendy encourages Prince to allow Scooter to conduct a classical orchestra despite Bradford's advice that it will alienate voters. Wags bribes a scientist to downgrade a hurricane from category 5 to 4 so that an insurance company Prince is invested in can avoid a huge payout. When both of their plans fail they agree to work together in the future rather than acting on their own. After Dr. Mayer drops all her other patients at Prince Capital, Wendy begins seeing her over concerns that stopping Prince will damage the other employees of Prince Capital. Prince's private jet is used by an NFT scammer, whose rich father has several business deals with Prince, to flee the country without his knowledge. Chuck intends to prosecute Prince for a variety of charges related to this, but Prince orders the plane to return to the United States and shows up to escort the fugitive off the plane himself in front of reporters, minimizing the damage to his reputation.
77	5	"The Gulag Archipelago"	Naomi Geraghty	Amadou Diallo	September 8, 2023	0.184
Ira's phone, which contains sex videos of him and his wife, is stolen. Chuck helps him get it back even though in the process he has to agree that Dave will be first chair in any prosecutions of Michael Prince. Chuck does this because he has decided to emphasize his personal relationships over his career. Taylor orchestrates a trade that will require Prince's approval while he and Scooter are unavailable to convince him to allow someone else to approve trades over $500 million in the future. Prince agrees to allow Wags to approve such trades, giving Wags, Taylor (who officially joins the effort to sabotage Prince's campaign), and Wendy another potential way to disrupt Prince's presidential run. Kate visits Bryan Connerty, who is now out of jail, to make sure he won't disrupt her own political campaign and he suggests that she get him his law license back and they become allies.
78	6	"The Man in the Olive Drab T-Shirt"	Shaz Bennett	Eli Attie	September 15, 2023	0.275
Prince goes on national television to announce his independent run for the Presidency. His performance is a smash hit despite Wendy Rhoades attempt to sabotage it psychologically. Bobby Axelrod gets Chuck Rhoades to let the Russian oligarch he deported back into the U.S. to take care of “personal business” (his wife’s divorce action). [He does that to repay the oligarch for getting arms to Ukraine.]. But that puts Bobby in debt to Chuck.
79	7	"DMV"	Rose Beth Johnson-Brown	Brian Koppelman & David Levien	September 22, 2023	0.247
Chuck’s father tries to bribe a motor vehicle license examiner to give Kevin a pass on his driving test and gets arrested in the process. That causes a crise de conscience for Chuck and Wendy over their parenting skills. Prince tries to buy a company whose owner has developed a revolutionary concrete product. Philip, who brought the company to Prince’s attention tries to stop the takeover by meeting with Chuck. Chuck stops what is happening by having the Department of Defence take it over instead as a national security measure. Both Prince and the owner lose out. MPC employees get tricked into an exercise designed to rate their effectiveness and performance, causing resentment.
80	8	"The Owl"	Daniel Gray Longino	Aiyana Kim White	September 29, 2023	N/A
81	9	"Game Theory Optimal"	Shaz Bennett	Beth Schacter	October 6, 2023	0.201
82	10	"Enemies List"	Daniel Gray Longino	Eli Attie	October 13, 2023	0.196
83	11	"Axe Global"	Sylvain White	Brian Koppelman & David Levien & Beth Schacter	October 20, 2023	0.249
84	12	"Admirals Fund"	Neil Burger	Brian Koppelman & David Levien	October 27, 2023	0.251

== Ratings ==
Billions : U.S. viewers per episode (thousands)

Season	Episode number												Average
Season	1	2	3	4	5	6	7	8	9	10	11	12	Average
1	904	950	1282	851	1010	1172	1051	1093	1127	1103	1080	1013	1098
2	753	512	851	981	857	922	903	1029	847	912	974	1019	880
3	928	839	849	722	874	773	984	965	952	775	900	938	875
4	843	790	824	886	751	680	741	761	678	729	782	793	772
5	610	633	568	625	519	647	660	192	392	318	331	394	491
6	321	330	315	219	374	338	374	326	310	300	319	322	321
7	226	186	234	205	184	275	247	TBD	201	196	249	251	223

Audience measurement performed by Nielsen Media Research
