= Lea Deutsch =

Croatian actress

- Lea Deutsch in 1933
- Born: 18 March 1927; Zagreb, Kingdom of Serbs, Croats, and Slovenes
- Died: May 1943 (aged 16); Died en route to Auschwitz
- Cause of death: Starvation and exhaustion
- Resting place: Auschwitz, Oswiecim, Nazi Germany (now Poland)
- Occupation: Child actress

Lea Deutsch (Croatian pronunciation: [lêa dâjtʃ]; 18 March 1927 – May 1943) was a Croatian Jewish child actress who was murdered in the Holocaust.

== Early life ==
Lea Dragica Deutsch was born in Zagreb to Croatian Jewish parents, Stjepan and Ivka (née Singer) Deutsch. Their surname was at the time also spelled Dajč. Her father was a lawyer, and her mother was an educated housewife, who was actively engaged in chess. She also had a brother, Saša. The Deutsch family lived in Zagreb at Gundulićeva street 39 in a three-story house. Deutsch began acting at the HNK Zagreb at the age of five, playing small roles in professional productions of Molière and Shakespeare. Her mentor and dance teacher was Rod Riffler, a modern dance teacher and choreographer from Zagreb. People were enchanted by her, and she was thought an exceptional talent, a "Croatian Shirley Temple." Even the famous Parisian firm Pathé heard of Deutsch and arrived in Zagreb to film a short documentary about her. She quickly rose to become a popular child actor.

In 1941, the Independent State of Croatia (Croatian: Nezavisna Država Hrvatska, or NDH) began the implementation of race laws which prevented Deutsch from acting. Immediately after the establishment of the NDH, she was banned from the theater where she performed and a little later from a school that she attended. Deutsch's schoolmate Relja Bašić recalls:

"She used to sit motionless on a bench across from the theater in a little herringbone pattern coat with a yellow star of David on her sleeves, staring for hours at the building where once she was a star, and now she couldn't even enter the building."

== Arrest, deportation and death ==
Last known photo of Lea Deutsch, taken a few months before her death.

In an attempt to save his family, Deutsch's father converted his family to Catholicism in June 1941. On 5 May 1943 Heinrich Himmler visited Zagreb. During his visit he pressed NDH leader Ante Pavelić to enact the "Final Solution" in his territory. In the coming days, Croatian and German officials began detaining the heads of the Jewish community in Zagreb and any remaining Jews who had been allowed to stay in the city up until that point.

Members of the national theatre intervened to try to help Deutsch and her family. Actors Tito Strozzi, Vika Podgorska, and Hindko Nučić, and the theatre's attendant Dušan Žanko (himself a member of the Ustaše) all attempted to save Deutsch's life. "Ordinary" people tried to save the Deutsch family. An escape trip to Karlovac was organized for the Deutsch family, where they were supposed to meet up with the partisans, but they had to return to Zagreb because they failed to meet with their "connection." Jewish attempts to transport the Deutsch family to the British Mandate of Palestine also failed.

In the lower floor of their house, the Deutsch family had at one time a tenant, a young man from Herzegovina, who occasionally wore the Ustaše uniform. In the words of Deutsch's friend Nika Grgić, this young man offered to falsely marry Lea in an attempt to save her from deportation, but that was not done for unknown reasons. Later it was discovered that Deutsch's mother did not want to consent to the wedding, because Lea was still a minor at the time.

In May 1943, Deutsch, her mother and her brother were deported to Auschwitz by the Nazis. Out of 75 prisoners during the six-day journey in the cattle wagon, without food and water, 25 did not survive. Lea Deutsch was among them, her heart having been weakened by diphtheria in her childhood. Her mother and brother were killed in Auschwitz. Her father, Stjepan, managed to save himself, hiding as a patient who suffered from infectious ocular trachoma at the ward of an ophthalmologist, Dr Vilko Panac, in the Sisters of Charity Hospital, Zagreb. Stjepan Deutsch survived the Holocaust and lived until 1959. He was buried in the Jewish part of the Mirogoj Cemetery, with Lea's photo on his tombstone.

== Legacy ==
In 2003, a Lauder Jewish elementary school in Zagreb was named after her.

In 2011 Croatian director Branko Ivanda made a film Lea and Darija, about Deutsch.

== Bibliography ==
- Snješka Knežević, Aleksander Laslo (2011). Židovski Zagreb. Zagreb: AGM, Židovska općina Zagreb. ISBN 978-953-174-393-8.
- Goldstein, Ivo (2001). Holokaust u Zagrebu. Zagreb: Novi Liber. ISBN 953-6045-19-2.
