= Zora Stančič =

Slovene graphic and visual artist (born 1956)

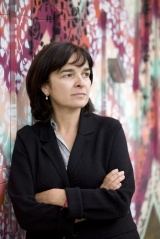
- Born: 10 March 1956 (age 70); Štrbe, Bosnia and Herzegovina
- Education: University of Sarajevo; University of Ljubljana
- Style: Lithography
- Partner: Damjan Kozole
- Children: 1

Zora Stančič-Bitenc (born 10 March 1956) is a Slovene graphic and visual artist who primarily works in the medium of lithographic printmaking and film.

== Biography ==
Stančič was born on 10 March 1956 in Štrbe, Bosnia and Herzegovina. As a child she moved with her family to Ljubljana, Slovenia.

Stančič studied her bachelors degree at the University of Sarajevo and her masters degree at the Academy of Fine Arts and Design, University of Ljubljana. She has also studied in Paris, France (1988), Vienna, Austria (1989), the USA (1993) and the Czech Republic (2001).

Stančič is a contemporary graphic and visual artist who primarily works in the mediums of lithographic printmaking and film. She has exhibited in Slovenia at Ljubljana Castle and the City Art Gallery in Ljubljana; and Monfort Gallery in Portorož. She has works in the permanent collections of the Museum of Modern Art and the International Graphic Art Centre, both in Ljubljana. From December 2025 to February 2026, a piece by Stančič will feature in an exhibition at Galerija Loža in Koper, Slovenia.

Internationally, Stančič has works held in the permanent collections of the Albertina in Vienna, Austria; the Fond National D'art Contemporain in Paris, France; Museum of Modern Art in New York City, United States; and the Museum of New Zealand Te Papa Tongarewa in Wellington, New Zealand.

Between 1992 and 1999, Stančič was the art editor of the cultural newspaper Views.

Alongside her art career, Stančič has worked as a costume designer, designing for the Slovenian films Nočno življenje [sl] (2016), Slovenka (2009) and Za vedno [sl] (2008). She designed a graphic "kiss me" print which was used for pyjamas by Alber Elbaz's AZFactory fashion brand.

Stančič received the Župančičeva nagrada [sl] award in 2016. She was awarded the Association of Fine Artists Ljubljana (DLUL)'s Ivana Kobilac Lifetime Achievement Award in 2023.

== Personal life ==
Stančič's partner is Damjan Kozole and they have a son together.
