= Damjan Kozole =

Slovenian filmmaker (born 1964)

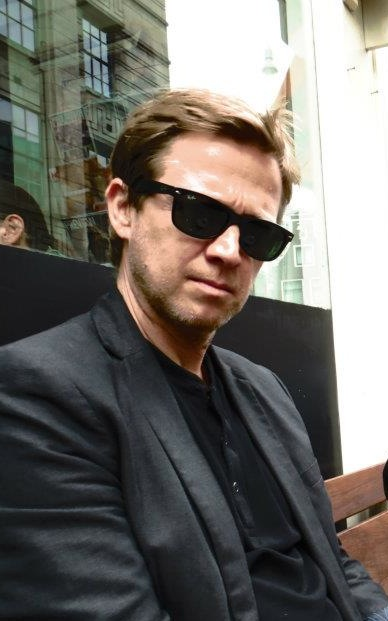
Kozole in 2012

Damjan Kozole (born 1964 in Brežice, Slovenia) is a Slovenian filmmaker whose directing credits include the 2003 critically acclaimed Spare Parts and 2009 worldwide released Slovenian Girl, among others. Spare Parts was nominated for the Golden Bear at the 53rd Berlin International Film Festival; in 2008 Sight & Sound ranked this film among the ten most important films of the New Europe.

In 2012, Kozole received Lifetime Achievement Award at the Rome Film Festival.

In his films, "some of the most raffish, funky and even sordid characters discover their own humanity" (Alissa Simon, Variety).

For his new film Nightlife (2016) he won Best director award at the 51st Karlovy Vary International Film Festival.

== Selected feature films ==
Spare Parts (Rezervni deli)

His 2003 feature film Spare Parts tells a story of two human traffickers from a small town in Slovenia who transport illegal migrants from Croatia on to the Western Europe, for a hefty fee. The film was premiered in the Competition Programme at Berlinale 2003 and following that at more than fifty international film festivals, where it won many international awards. It was released theatrically in more than 20 countries. According to The Guardian, "Slovenian writer-director Damjan Kozole has given us one of the most powerful and provocative movies of the year" (Peter Bradshaw). 2008 Sight & Sound ranked Spare Parts among ten most important films of the “New Europe”.

Labour Equals Freedom (Delo osvobaja)

Labour Equals Freedom was premiered at the Locarno International Film Festival 2005 and won the Grand Prix (Golden Palm) and best director award (Silver Palm) at the 2006 Valencia Int. Film Festival. It tells a story of a depressed middle-age man who, due to a twist of fate, finds new joy in life through working for the common good. According to Variety, "Kozole creates a mood of affectionate cynicism, with shrewd subtexts tallying foibles of contempo society" (Eddie Cockrell).

Forever (Za vedno)

Forever (2008) is a minimalist, full-length feature film Kozole shot in six nights in his own apartment. The film was premiered at the Rotterdam International Film Festival 2008 and won the Golden Sun award for best film at the European Film Festival in Skopje, Macedonia. The story of Forever develops in almost real time. We witness what is going on behind an apartment door: the hellish psychological moments of a couple where the thin line between love and hate breaks down. According to Rotterdam International Film Festival programmer Ludmila Cvikova, "the script is masterfully processed by the director and the entire film is carried by the excellent achievements of the two leading actors".

Slovenian Girl (Slovenka)

Slovenian Girl (2009) was premiered at the 2009 Toronto International Film Festival and following that shown at more than 100 international film festivals. Alexandra, a twenty-three-year-old Slovenian, leads a double life: she is a respectable student and a call girl. The film won Grand Prix, Best director award and Best screenplay award at 2012 Girona film festival, Public award at the 2010 Cinessone Film Festival, Paris and Nina Ivanisin won many international awards for her leading role. The film was released theatrically in more than 50 countries, in US under the title A Call Girl. According to Moving Pictures Magazine, "the film is ultimately a fascinating study of free enterprise in free fall. In this mesmerizing chamber piece, director Damjan Kozole has contrived a new style of narrative to convey a view of capitalist culture at once outrageous and non-judgmental" (Shaz Bennett).

Nightlife (Nočno življenje)

== Documentary films ==
Kozole is also the author of many documentaries dealing with visual arts like Ulay's journal from November to November – a feature-length documentary about artist Ulay (2012) or Two or Three Things I know About Her – about visual artist Zora Stančič (2010), and documentary films dealing with social themes like The Long Vacation – a feature-length documentary on formally erased citizens (2012, Best Slovenian documentary of the year).
