= Spare Parts (2003 film) =

2003 film

- Directed by: Damjan Kozole
- Starring: Peter Musevski
- Release date: 5 February 2003
- Running time: 1h 27min
- Country: Slovenia
- Language: Slovenian

Spare Parts (Slovene: Rezervni deli) is a 2003 Slovenian drama film directed by Damjan Kozole.

== Plot ==
Two human traffickers from a small town in Slovenia transport illegal migrants from Croatia to Western Europe, for a hefty fee.

== Reception ==
According to The Guardian, "Slovenian writer-director Damjan Kozole has given us one of the most powerful and provocative movies of the year". 2008 Sight & Sound ranked Spare Parts among ten most important films of the “New Europe”.
