= Rod Riffler =

Croatian dance teacher and choreographer

- Rod Riffler with Magdalena Bachrach (Miss Rab 35') in 1935
- Born: Rudolf Ungar; 5 January 1907; Osijek, Kingdom of Croatia-Slavonia, Austria-Hungary
- Died: 1941 (aged 34); Jasenovac, Independent State of Croatia
- Cause of death: Starvation
- Occupations: Dance teacher; choreographer

Rod Riffler (born Rudolf Ungar; 5 January 1907 – 1941) was a Croatian modern dance teacher, choreographer and owner of a dance school in Zagreb, who was killed during the Holocaust.

Riffler was born in Osijek to Jewish parents, Makso Ungar and Ilka Lang. His father was merchant born in Osijek. Riffler was raised with two sisters, Marie Louise and Marija, and younger brother, Rafael. When he moved from Osijek to Zagreb, Riffler opened a dance school and was one of the best teachers of modern dance at the time. Riffler was mentor-teacher of Lea Deutsch, known Croatian Jewish child actress, and was a close friend of Deutsch's mother, Ivka. In 1941, when Ustashas found out that he was Jewish and gay, Riffler was arrested and deported to the Jasenovac concentration camp. Riffler died from starvation at the camp. He was 34 years old.

In 2010, Croatian director Branko Ivanda made a film Lea and Darija, about the tragic destiny of Lea Deutsch, and Riffler was portrayed in the movie by Croatian actor Radovan Ruždjak.
