= Štrbe =

Štrbe Штрбе
- Village
- Location within Bosnia and Herzegovina
- Coordinates: 44°44′55″N 17°19′25″E
- Country: Bosnia and Herzegovina
- Entity: Republika Srpska
- Municipality: Čelinac
- Time zone: UTC+1 (CET)
  - Summer (DST): UTC+2 (CEST)

Štrbe (Serbian Cyrillic: Штрбе) is a village in the municipality of Čelinac, Republika Srpska, Bosnia and Herzegovina.

== Notable people ==
- Zora Stančič (born 1956), graphic and visual artist
