= Jan Cvitkovič =

Slovenian filmmaker

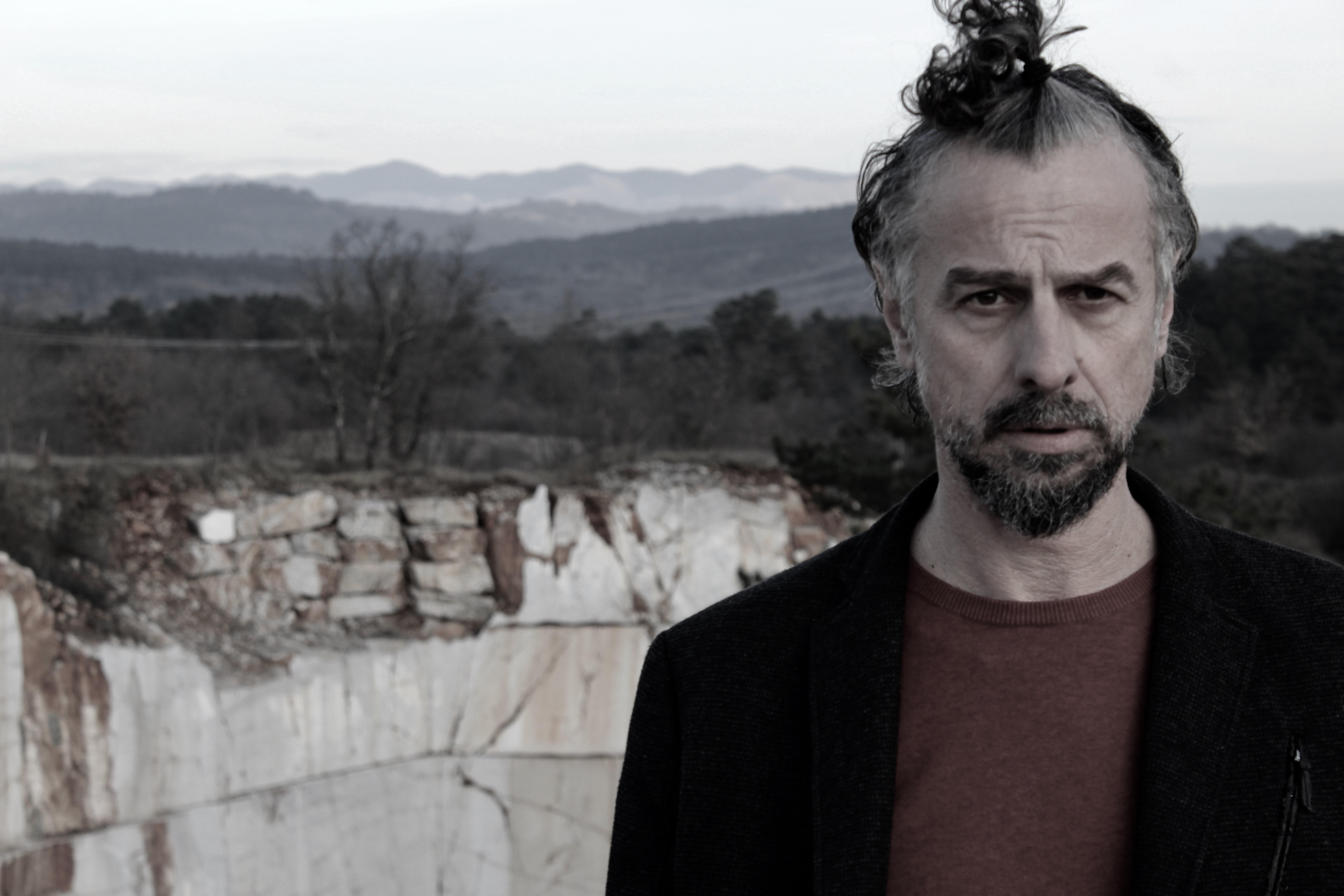
- Born: Ljubljana, Slovenia
- Occupations: Director, screenwriter, actor
- Years active: Late 1990s–present
- Awards: Lion of the Future (Venice Film Festival), Best New Director (San Sebastian Film Festival)

Jan Cvitkovič (born 1966) is a Slovenian film director, screenwriter and actor.

== Life and career ==
Jan Cvitkovič was born in Ljubljana. He attended primary school in Tolmin and finished his high school studies in Idrija. He graduated in Archaeology from the Faculty of Arts in Ljubljana.

In the late '90s, he entered the world of filmmaking as a screenwriter, soon after that as an actor and finally as a film director.

His films have been screened at more than 200 festivals around the world and have received more than 60 awards. The most notable awards he received were the Lion of the Future at the Venice Film Festival and the Best New Director Award at the San Sebastian Film Festival.

His films have been broadcast in several European countries on well-known television stations such as TV1000, RAI, HBO, ARTE, SBS Australia.

Cvitkovič received the Prešeren Fund Award at the University of Ljubljana for his significant artistic works in the field of film and television.

He is a member of the European Film Academy and has also been a jury member at several international film festivals in Locarno, Sarajevo, Miami, Gijon, Palm Springs, Warsaw, Skopje, Herceg Novi, and Belgrade.

He was a guest lecturer at University of Pennsylvania (UPenn), where his feature films were screened.

Cvitkovič is also the co-founder of the film production company STARAGARA and the initiator and honorary president of the International Film Festival Kino Otok (Isola Cinema).

== Filmography (feature films) ==
=== Director ===
- Bread and Milk (2001) ... Kruh in mleko (SI)
- Gravehopping (2005) ... Odgrobadogroba (SI)
- Archeo (2011) Šiška Deluxe (2015)
- The Basics of Killing (2017) ... Družinica (SI)

=== Screenwriter ===
- Idle Running (1999) – co-writer ... V leru (SI)
- Bread and Milk (2001) ... Kruh in mleko (SI)
- Gravehopping (2005) ... Odgrobadogroba (SI)
- Archeo (2011) Šiška Deluxe (2015)
- The Basics of Killing (2017) ... Družinica (SI)

=== Actor ===
- Idle Running (1999) – co-writer ... V leru (SI)
- Bread and Milk (2001) ... Kruh in mleko (SI)
- Oda Presernu (2001)
- Desperado Tonic (2004)
- Good Night, Missy (2011) ... Lahko noč, gospodična (SI)
- Zoran, My Nephew the Idiot (2013) ... Zoran, il mio nipote scemo (IT)
- Driving School (2014) ... Avtošola (SI)
- Volevo fare la rockstar (Italian TV Series, RAI, 2019)
- Eppure cadiamo felici (Italian TV Series, RAI, 2022)
- Primeri inspektorja Vrenka (2023)

== Filmography (short films) ==
=== Director ===
- The Heart Is a Piece of Meat (2003) ... Srce je kos mesa (SI)
- I Know (2007) ... Vem (SI)
- This is Earth, My Brother (2009)
- Hundred Dogs (2012) ... Sto psov (SI)
- I Was a Child (2013) ... Bil sem otrok (SI)
- Love on the Roof of the World (2015) ... Ljubezen na strehi sveta (SI)
- Fishing (2016) ... Ribolov (SI)
- Versopolis (2018)
- Do You See Me? (2022) ... A ti mene vidiš? (SI)

=== Screenwriter ===
- Robbery of the Century (1998) ... Rop stoletja (SI)
- The Heart Is a Piece of Meat (2003) ... Srce je kos mesa (SI)
- I Know (2007) ... Vem (SI)
- This is Earth, My Brother (2009)
- Hundred Dogs (2012) ... Sto psov (SI)
- I Was a Child (2013) ... Bil sem otrok (SI)
- Love on the Roof of the World (2015) ... Ljubezen na strehi sveta (SI)
- Fishing (2016) ... Ribolov (SI)
- Versopolis (2018)
- Smehljanje nasih pesnikov (2019)
- Do You See Me? (2022) ... A ti mene vidiš? (SI)

=== Actor ===
- I Was a Child (2013) ... Bil sem otrok (SI)
- Reconciliation (2014) ... Sprava (SI)
- Versopolis (2018)

== TV Series ==
- Odklop (1997) – co-writer
- Daleč je smrt (2002) – director and co-writer
- Lenin's Park (2022) – actor

== Documentaries ==
- Total Gambit (2010) – director and co-writer
- Gram of Heart (2024) – director

== Awards ==
=== Robbery of the Century (Rop stoletja) ===
- Grossman Award for Best Screenplay
- Krakow Film Festival
  - Awarded film
- Klagenfurt Film Festival
  - Awarded film

=== Idle Running (V leru) ===
- Festival of Slovenian Film (1999)
  - Award for Best Screenplay
  - Stop Award for Best Actor of the Year
- Kyiv Film Festival (1999)
  - Best Actor Award
- FilmFestival Cottbus (1999)
  - Best Actor Award
- Faces of Love Film Festival (2000)
  - Best Actor Award

=== Bread and Milk (Kruh in mleko) ===
- Foreign language OSCAR candidate
- Festival of Slovenian Film (2001)
  - Vesna Award for Best Actor – Peter Musevski
  - Vesna Award for Best Supporting Actress Award – Sonja Savic
- Venice Film Festival (2001)
  - Lion of the Future – Best Debut Feature Film Award
- FilmFestival Cottbus (2001)
  - Special Jury Prize
  - Don Quijotte – Prize of the International Federation of Film Clubs
  - Special Mention of the FIPRESCI Jury
- Ljubljana International Film Festival (2001)
  - KingFisher Award – Best Film of the Perspective section
- Gorizia Film Festival (2001)
  - Darko Bratina Prize
- Bratislava International Film Festival (2001)
  - Best Actor Award of the Festival Jury
  - FIPRESCI Jury Special Mention Award
- Motovun Film Festival (2002)
  - Jury Special Mention Award
- Valencia International Film Festival (2002)
  - Best Actor Award – Peter Musevski

=== The Heart Is a Piece of Meat (Srce je kos mesa) ===
- Venice Film Festival (2004)
  - International premiere in the Corto Cortissimo Competition
- Gijon International Film Festival (2004)
  - Best Short Film Award
- FilmFestival Cottbus (2004)
  - Special Mention Award
- Festival Internacional de Cortos FIB, Spain (2005)
  - Best Actor Award – Primož Petkovšek

=== Gravehopping (Odgrobadogroba) ===
- Foreign language OSCAR candidate (2005)
- San Sebastian International Film Festival (2005)
  - Altadis New Director Award
- Warsaw International Film Festival (2005)
  - CentEast Award
- FilmFestival Cottbus (2005)
  - Ecumenical Jury Award for Best Film
  - Main Prize for Best Film
- Torino Film Festival (2005)
  - Best Script Award
  - Best Film Award
- Ljubljana International Film Festival (2005)
  - Jury Special Mention Award
- Festival of Slovenian Film (2005)
  - Best Feature Film
  - Best Supporting Actress Award
  - Best Supporting Actor Award
- Spirit of Fire Film Festival in Russia (2006)
  - Second Prize (Silver Taiga)
  - Special Jury Award for the most impressive film scene
- Sofia International Film Festival (2006)
  - Best Balkan Film Award
- Festroia Film Festival (2006)
  - Special Jury Prize (Silver Dolphin)
- Palic European Film Festival (2006)
  - Best Film Award (Golden Tower)
- Pécs International Film Celebration (2006)
  - Best Actor Award – Gregor Baković
  - Best Cinematography Award – Simon Tanšek
  - Audience Award
- International Torun Film Festival TOFFI (2006)
  - Special Jury Prize
  - Critic Award of Zygmunt Kałużyński
- Noordelijk Film Festival (2006)
  - Student Jury Award
- South East European Film Festival (2007)
  - Critics Award for Best Film

=== I Know (Vem) ===
- World premiere at the Locarno Film Festival (2008)
- Festival of Slovenian Film (2000)
  - Vesna Award for Best Short Fiction Film
- Gong Award of the Delo Newspaper (2008)

=== Total Gambit (Totalni gambit) ===
Documentary of the Month on Slovenian National Television (2010)

=== Archeo ===
- Festival of Slovenian Film (2011)
  - Vesna Award for Best Feature Film
  - Vesna Award for Best Director – Jan Cvitkovič
  - Vesna Award for Best Cinematography – Jure Černec
- International Film Festival Innsbruck (2012)
  - Best Film Award

=== Hundred Dogs (Sto psov) ===
- Festival of Slovenian Film (2012)
  - Vesna Award for Best Original Music

=== I Was a Child (Bil sem otrok) ===
- the film was created upon the proposal of the Venice Film Festival
- World premiere at the Venice Film Festival (2013)

=== Love on the Roof of the World (Ljubezen na strehi sveta) ===
- Festival of Slovenian Film (2015)
  - Vesna Award for Best Short Fiction Film
  - Vesna Award for Best Director – Jan Cvitkovič
  - Vesna Award for Best Original Music – Niko Novak
  - Vesna Award for Best Actor in a Leading Role – Ivo Barišič

=== Šiška Deluxe ===
- World premiere at the Montreal World Film Festival (2015)
- FilmFestival Cottbus (2015)
  - Audience Award

=== The Basics of Killing (Družinica) ===
- Montreal World Film Festival (2017)
  - Best Actress Award – Irena Kovačević
- Festival of Slovenian Film (2017)
  - Vesna Award for Best Cinematography – Marko Brdar
  - Vesna Award for Best Costume Design – Polonca Valentinčič in Emil Cerar
  - Vesna Award for Best Original Music – Damir Avdić
- Zagreb Film Festival (2017)
  - Special Jury Award
- Belgrade International Film Festival (2018)
  - Special Jury Award
- Mostar Film Festival (2018)
  - Best Actress Award
- See Online Film Festival in Los Angeles (2018)
  - Special Mention Award

=== Do You See Me? (A ti mene vidiš?) ===
- Veracruz Itinerant Short Film Festival (2022)
  - Special Mention

=== Gram of Heart (Gram srca) ===
- Independent Film Festival in Ljubljana (2025)
  - Grand Prix Award

=== Film Opus ===
- FICE – Federazione Italiana Cinema d'Essai (2025)
  - FICE Award for Life's Work
