= Billions (TV series) =

American drama television series

- Genre: Drama
- Created by: Brian Koppelman; David Levien; Andrew Ross Sorkin
- Starring: Paul Giamatti; Damian Lewis; Maggie Siff; Malin Akerman; Toby Leonard Moore; David Costabile; Condola Rashad; Asia Kate Dillon; Jeffrey DeMunn; Kelly AuCoin; Corey Stoll; Daniel Breaker; Sakina Jaffrey; Toney Goins
- Composer: Eskmo
- Country of origin: United States
- Original language: English
- No. of seasons: 7
- No. of episodes: 84 (list of episodes)

Production
- Executive producers: Brian Koppelman; David Levien; Christian Soriano; Andrew Ross Sorkin; Neil Burger
- Production location: New York City
- Camera setup: Single-camera
- Running time: 54–60 minutes
- Production companies: Best Available!; TBTF Productions Inc. (seasons 1–2); Showtime Networks

Original release
- Network: Showtime
- Release: January 17, 2016 – April 10, 2022
- Network: Paramount+ with Showtime
- Release: August 11 – October 27, 2023

Billions is an American drama television series created by Brian Koppelman, David Levien, and Andrew Ross Sorkin. The series premiered on January 17, 2016, on Showtime, and its seventh and final season premiered on August 11, 2023 on Paramount+ with Showtime, before airing on Showtime two days later.

Set primarily in New York and Connecticut, the series depicts hedge fund manager Bobby Axelrod (Damian Lewis) as he accumulates wealth and power in the world of high finance. Axelrod's aggressive tactics frequently garner the attention of United States Attorney Chuck Rhoades (Paul Giamatti). Rhoades is based on Preet Bharara, the United States Attorney for the Southern District of New York in Manhattan from 2009 to 2017, and the series was inspired by real-life federal prosecutions of financial crime. Bharara's 2013 prosecution of hedge fund manager Steven A. Cohen of S.A.C. Capital Advisors loosely influenced the first season, while Salomon Brothers' 1991 manipulation of U.S. Treasury bonds inspired the second. Series subplots feature the psychiatrist turned performance coach Wendy Rhoades (Maggie Siff), market analyst Taylor Mason (Asia Kate Dillon), and Axelrod's right-hand man Mike "Wags" Wagner (David Costabile).

== Plot ==
U.S. Attorney for the Southern District of New York Chuck Rhoades (Paul Giamatti) receives a tip that hedge fund magnate Bobby "Axe" Axelrod (Damian Lewis) has traded on insider information. Axelrod's inner circle consists of Rhoades' wife, performance coach Wendy (Maggie Siff), and Michael "Wags" Wagner (David Costabile). Chuck begins an investigation into the firm and arrests one of Axelrod's top confidantes, Dollar Bill (Kelly AuCoin). Wendy attempts to negotiate an armistice between Chuck and Axelrod via a settlement; though both parties agree to the terms, Chuck sabotages the deal at the last moment to spite Axelrod. In an attempt to appease Wendy, Chuck recuses himself from the investigation and gives the case to his point man Bryan Connerty (Toby Leonard Moore) – though Chuck insists on being informed as to the investigation's progress. Connerty flips one of Axelrod's traders Donnie Caan (David Cromer), though it is later revealed that Donnie had been diagnosed with a terminal illness and Axelrod used him to feed the FBI information he wouldn't live to testify for. In the wake of this failure, the Attorney General requests that the investigation into Axelrod end. Wendy leaves Chuck after he breaches her session notes for proof of Axelrod's illegalities; she also leaves Axe Capital, unable to work at a firm that engages in such practices.

An investigation, to be led by official misconduct investigator Oliver Dake (Christopher Denham), is opened into Chuck's office. Axelrod senses his vulnerability and orchestrates a class action lawsuit against Chuck. With the Attorney General prepared to fire him, Chuck announces an investigation into Spartan Ives CEO Lawrence Boyd (Eric Bogosian) in a last ditch effort to save his position; the AG postpones Chuck's termination as it would appear that the administration would be meddling on Boyd's behalf. Meanwhile, for the sake of her family, Wendy agrees to return to Axe Capital if Axelrod drops the lawsuits against Chuck. Axelrod agrees and Wendy returns to the firm; she also reunites with her husband while Axelrod's own marriage crumbles. In another loss for Axelrod, Chuck arrests Boyd and gets him to agree to a hefty settlement, resulting in Chuck's elevated status and the end of the investigation into his office. Meanwhile, Chuck's personal attorney and Chuck Rhoades Sr. (Jeffrey DeMunn) unite for a promising business venture, a beverage company titled Ice Juice. With the IPO projected to soar, Axelrod is informed of the venture's proximity to Chuck and attempts to sabotage it by inducing minor poisoning through compromised associates. Wendy attempts to alert Chuck to this but, frustrated by his disbelief, buys a short on the IPO herself. The Ice Juice IPO crashes, though this is revealed to have been Chuck's ultimate plan: he baited Axelrod to sabotage the venture and leveraged Dake (the newly appointed Eastern District Attorney) to investigate it; Axelrod is subsequently arrested and indicted.

The newly appointed Attorney General Jock Jeffcoat (Clancy Brown) takes office and spares Chuck in the midst of a purge in the legal branches. Axelrod relinquishes his ability to trade until his legal woes are resolved. Connerty is sent to Eastern to oversee the prosecution against Axelrod; however, Connerty soon becomes aware of Chuck's prosecutorial misconduct. Chuck and Axelrod both become aware of a piece of evidence that could incriminate Axe: a slide of the toxicant Axe used to poison his associates. The slide, in the possession of a doctor (Seth Barrish) who Axelrod consulted while planning the Ice Juice sabotage, is given to Chuck so Dr. Gilbert wouldn't have to testify. Meanwhile, Connerty becomes aware of Wendy's Ice Juice short and believes this was part of a larger conspiracy. With Wendy facing prison time, Chuck and Axelrod agree to save her by framing Dr. Gilbert and planting the slide in his residence. Connerty dismisses the indictment against Axelrod and Dake is fired as District Attorney. Connerty returns to SDNY but is publicly humiliated and fired by Chuck. Meanwhile, Axelrod returns to Axe Capital with the goal of a massive cap raise; he faces insurrection from trader Taylor Mason (Asia Kate Dillon), who had become a close protege of Axelrod's prior to his trial. Taylor opens their own shop and steals clients acquired during the cap raise. AG Jeffcoat attempts to assert the administration's conservative agenda into the cases Chuck works at SDNY. Chuck attempts to gain leverage over the AG by investigating Jeffcoat's brother; this backfires when Jeffcoat becomes aware and fires him. In the aftermath of their respective betrayals, Chuck and Axe meet to discuss their schemes moving forward.

Connerty is appointed to be Chuck's successor as SDNY District Attorney. With Axelrod's help, Chuck plots a political comeback, seeking the position of New York Attorney General. With a political enemy threatening to expose his BDSM private life, Chuck confesses via press conference that he is a masochist and he nonetheless trusts the voters; his popularity soars and he is elected NYAG, though Wendy is left humiliated. Axelrod attempts to sabotage Taylor's shop by colluding with banks to deny Taylor leverage, and with the help of Wendy, undermines a business venture spearheaded by Taylor's father (Kevin Pollak). With Connerty and Jeffcoat still a threat to his power, Chuck and his father embark on a phony land deal in a successful effort to bait Connerty into crossing legal boundaries to sabotage the Rhoades'; Connerty and Jeffcoat are both arrested for their involvement in the scheme. Wendy is investigated for crossing ethical boundaries by exploiting Taylor's personal information regarding their father. Axelrod is ultimately able to destroy Taylor's shop, though he acquires Taylor and their personnel back into Axe Capital; he also leverages the medical board to dismiss the charges against Wendy. After learning that Chuck took no action to protect her, Wendy divorces him; Chuck puts Axelrod back in his crosshairs for the dissolution of his marriage.

Axe crosses the $10 billion mark and wants to go into banking, citing the limits of hedge funds; he also begins a feud with billionaire Mike Prince (Corey Stoll) after being snubbed for a magazine cover. Chuck attempts to sabotage Axe's attempt to acquire a bank charter, though this effort is ultimately unsuccessful. As their war of words escalates, Axe damages Prince's reputation by unearthing allegations that Prince exploited his deceased co-founder; in retaliation, Prince agrees to work with Chuck to bring down. Meanwhile, Wendy and Axe confront their feelings for each other, ultimately admitting they want to be together. Prince and Chuck stage a meeting to discuss marijuana legalization, with Axelrod being informed that the federal government is about to legalize the substance. Under the belief he's stealing a deal Prince is about to make, Axelrod is baited into signing a deal with a marijuana company operating a criminal enterprise. After signing the deal, the CEO (Janeane Garofalo) is arrested and Axe Bank is to be held criminally liable; an arrest for Axelrod appears imminent. Axe informs Wendy that he plans on going on the run, after selling Axe Capital and Axe Bank to Prince for $2 billion. Chuck is left humiliated when Axe doesn't appear at the scheduled place for his surrender; he thus sets his sights on Prince for betraying him while Axelrod arrives in Switzerland a free man.

Axe Capital is revamped into Mike Prince Capital, with Prince aiming to run a more ethical shop than Axe did. Prince also spearheads an effort to bring the 2028 Summer Olympics to New York City; though this effort is briefly successful, it is sabotaged by Chuck when the NYAG office launches an investigation into Prince's committee bribing the International Olympic Committee. Upset with the expensive and dispiriting loss, Prince retaliates by convincing the governor (Matt Servitto) to initiate proceedings to remove Chuck as the state's Attorney General; these proceedings are ultimately successful and Chuck is removed as NYAG. The staff at Mike Prince Capital, namely Wendy, become suspicious of Prince's motives and discover that he is planning on running for president. With his behavior becoming increasingly egomaniacal, Wendy becomes worried about what Prince would do if successfully elected.

Prince announces his campaign as an independent candidate for president. Meanwhile, Chuck's image is rehabilitated as a "man of the people" taking on the billionaires and, after wooing Jeffcoat in exchange for an endorsement, is reinstated to his original position at SDNY. Wendy, Taylor, and Wags create an alliance to take down Prince, although they are unsuccessful in lobbying Axelrod to their effort. Prince's campaign soars after a televised address and after receiving a highly coveted endorsement at a private gentleman's club called The Owl. Prince becomes aware of the mutiny within the company and prepares a corporate espionage suit against Wendy, Wags and Taylor. Incensed by the threat to his friends, Axe returns to the United States to plot Prince's downfall. With Prince temporarily off the grid due to a meeting with the president, Chuck announces an investigation into several natural gas companies that Prince's firm has funnelled all of their holdings into; this triggers a crisis within those companies and Prince's wealth is effectively erased. With his presidential hopes dashed, Prince furiously trashes Wendy's office and prepares to return to Indiana with a measly $100 million. Axe reacquires his office space and designates it the new headquarters of Axe Global; he requests that Wendy stay as performance coach but she insists on leaving to head a telehealth firm, though she insists they will stay connected. The series ends with Wendy and Chuck enjoying a family dinner and Axe directing his traders to "make some fucking money".

== Cast and characters ==
Actor	Character	Season						
Actor	Character	1	2	3	4	5	6	7
Paul Giamatti	Charles "Chuck" Rhoades, Jr.	Main	Main	Main	Main	Main	Main	Main
Damian Lewis	Robert "Bobby" Axelrod	Main	Main	Main	Main	Main		Main
Maggie Siff	Wendy Rhoades	Main	Main	Main	Main	Main	Main	Main
Malin Åkerman	Lara Axelrod	Main	Main	Main	Guest			
Toby Leonard Moore	Bryan Connerty	Main	Main	Main	Main	Guest		Guest
David Costabile	Mike "Wags" Wagner	Main	Main	Main	Main	Main	Main	Main
Condola Rashad	Kate Sacker	Main	Main	Main	Main	Main	Main	Main
Asia Kate Dillon	Taylor Amber Mason		Recurring	Main	Main	Main	Main	Main
Jeffrey DeMunn	Charles Rhoades, Sr.	Recurring	Recurring	Main	Main	Main	Main	Main
Kelly AuCoin	"Dollar" Bill Stearn	Recurring	Recurring	Recurring	Main	Main	Recurring	Main
Corey Stoll	Michael Thomas Aquinas Prince					Recurring	Main	Main
Daniel Breaker	Scooter Dunbar					Recurring	Main	Main
Sakina Jaffrey	Daevisha "Dave" Mahar						Main	Main
Toney Goins	Phillip Charyn						Recurring	Main

=== Main ===
- Paul Giamatti as Charles "Chuck" Rhoades, Jr.: U.S. Attorney for the Southern District of New York, who later attempts a run for governor of New York and is elected Attorney General of New York. Rhoades is ruthless and has a particular distaste for wealthy criminals who try to buy their way out of justice. Despite his significant power as U.S. Attorney, Rhoades struggles not to be overshadowed both by his higher-earning wife, Wendy, and by his well-connected, wealthy father. He went to Yale (as did his father) and has a blind trust of which his father is a trustee. In private, he is a sadomasochist and engages in BDSM role play with Wendy and other women, acting as a "slave." The character is loosely based on the careers of Preet Bharara and Eliot Spitzer.
- Damian Lewis as Robert "Bobby" Axelrod (seasons 1–5, 7): an ambitious billionaire manager of the hedge fund Axe Capital and a Hofstra University graduate who came from humble beginnings. He was one of his firm's survivors of the September 11 attacks, reforming it as Axe Capital and paying the college tuition of the children of his colleagues who died in the World Trade Center. He is extremely charitable and generous in public, but uses insider trading and bribery to grow his firm's enormous wealth. He has unique instincts that have led to a virtually infallible trading career. The character is loosely based on Steven A. Cohen and his former hedge fund S.A.C. Capital Advisors.
- Maggie Siff as Wendy Rhoades: a psychiatrist, in-house performance coach at Axe Capital, wife and later ex-wife of Chuck Rhoades, Jr. She is self-possessed, motivated, extremely successful and went to Yale. She has a strong relationship with Axelrod, her boss, with whom she has been working for more than 15 years. She participates with Chuck in BDSM role play activities and dominates Chuck.
- Malin Åkerman as Lara Axelrod (starring seasons 1–3; guest season 4): wife and later ex-wife of Bobby Axelrod and a former nurse (who maintains her professional license). She is from a lower-class, blue-collar upbringing but has left her former self behind. She was devoted to her husband and their children. Her brother Dean, a New York City firefighter, was killed in the 9/11 attacks. Lara disapproves of Axe's close relationship with Wendy.
- Toby Leonard Moore as Bryan Connerty (starring seasons 1–4; guest seasons 5, 7): the Chief of the Securities and Commodities Fraud Task Force for the Southern District of New York and Rhoades's point man at the start of the series. He later succeeds Rhoades as U.S. Attorney for the Southern District of New York until he engages in illegal witness tampering, eventually spending time in prison for his crime. Chuck transfers him to a white-collar prison after making a deal with his brother.
- David Costabile as Mike "Wags" Wagner: COO of Axe Capital and Axelrod's right-hand man. He is a known drug and sex addict and claims cocaine helps him focus on work.
- Condola Rashad as Kate Sacker: head of crime and Assistant United States Attorney in the Southern District of New York, then later an attorney in Rhoades's office as Assistant to Attorney General of New York. She is biding her time until she has the opportunity to run for Congress. Her ultimate goal is to be President of the United States.
- Asia Kate Dillon as Taylor Amber Mason (recurring season 2; starring seasons 3–7): a talented financial analyst at Axe Capital. Mason becomes close to Axelrod and is appointed CIO of Axe Capital during his legal troubles. They later leave Axe Capital to form Taylor Mason Capital, which is later forced back to Axe Capital as a subsidiary in-house fund under Axelrod's control.
- Jeffrey DeMunn as Charles Rhoades, Sr. (recurring seasons 1–2; starring seasons 3–7): Chuck's father, a very wealthy and well-connected city/state power player who often uses his position to meddle in his son's affairs. He was abusive toward his ex-wife and frequently cheated on her. He had a child with, and then married, another woman.
- Kelly AuCoin as "Dollar" Bill Stearn (recurring seasons 1–3, 6; starring seasons 4–5, 7): a portfolio manager at Axe Capital with such loyalty to Axelrod that he would risk incriminating himself to save him. He was described by AuCoin as "the cheapest millionaire in America". Dollar Bill frequently resorts to insider trading and other legally dubious measures to create high returns for Axe Capital.
- Corey Stoll as Michael Thomas Aquinas Prince (recurring season 5; starring seasons 6–7): a business magnate, grew up a small town Indiana farm boy, who seemingly wants to give back to society. Prince attended New Castle High School where he was named Mr. Basketball as a senior. In season 6, he takes over Axe Capital, renaming it Michael Prince Capital, and he tries to win hosting duties for the 2028 Summer Olympics in New York.
- Daniel Breaker as Scooter Dunbar (recurring season 5; starring seasons 6–7): Michael Prince's right-hand man, later a co-right-hand alongside Wags.
- Sakina Jaffrey as Daevisha "Dave" Mahar (starring seasons 6–7): joined Rhoades to help him fight corruption and take down Prince.
- Toney Goins as Phillip Charyn (recurring season 6; starring season 7): Scooter's nephew, recruited by Prince to join Prince Capital due to his business acumen.

=== Recurring ===
- Dan Soder as Dudley Mafee: an Axe Capital employee who joins Taylor Mason Capital as its first employee
- Terry Kinney as Hall: a fixer on Axelrod's payroll
- Glenn Fleshler as Orrin Bach: Axelrod's legal counsel
- Stephen Kunken as Ari Spyros: a law school classmate and colleague at a private law firm of Chuck before his involvement in the public sector as an investigator for the SEC. In season 3, Spyros becomes head of compliance for Axe Capital.
- Ben Shenkman as Ira Schirmer: an attorney and a former law school classmate of Chuck, as well as former CEO/Chairman of bankrupted Ice Juice
- Daniel K. Isaac as Ben Kim: A graduate of Stanford University and Wharton School of Business. He is a Korean-American employee at Axe Capital promoted to portfolio manager in season 3.
- Rob Morrow as Adam DeGiulio: a high-ranking DOJ employee and later judge of the Southern District of New York. Chuck manipulated a powerful senator to get him the prestigious job of solicitor general.
- Louis Cancelmi as Victor Mateo: an employee of Axelrod's fired in season 1, funded outside in season 3 and forced back in season 4
- Jack Gilpin as Sean Ayles: runs Axelrod's foundation for Axelrod after his rise to power is revealed to the public in season 1
- Timothy Davis as Chef Ryan: the Axelrod family's personal chef
- Harry Lennix as Franklin Sacker: Kate Sacker's father
- Jack Gore as Gordie Axelrod (seasons 1–3, 5, 7)
- Malachi Weir as Lonnie Watley (seasons 1–4): a former Assistant United States Attorney in the Southern District of New York. He later joins a private law firm after being passed over for Head of Crim in favor of Sacker.
- Jerry O'Connell as Steven Birch (seasons 1–4, 6): a rival of Axelrod's who leads a competing hedge fund
- Arthur J. Nascarella as Bruno Caparello (seasons 1–4): aging former owner of Axelrod's favorite pizza shop
- Seth Barrish as Dr. Gilbert: Donnie's doctor who becomes a key witness in the case against Axelrod
- Nathan Darrow as Mick Danzig (seasons 1–2, 4): an Axe Capital employee, whom Axelrod got out of an automatic weapons charge, who quit the firm for ethical reasons after it bankrupted the city of Sandicot, but was hired back out of spite against Taylor in Season 4
- Dennis Boutsikaris as Kenneth Malverne (seasons 1–3): a rival of Axelrod's who leads a competing hedge fund
- Scott Cohen as Pete Decker (seasons 1, 3, 5): Decker financial later runs gym group thanks to Chuck getting him to agree to plea deal to prevent his parents going to jail for his illegal deals
- Deborah Rush as Ellen Rhoades (seasons 1, 3, 5): Chuck's mother and Sr's ex-wife
- Christopher Paul Richards (seasons 1–2); Brian Beckerle (season 3) as Dean Axelrod
- Susan Misner as Terri McCue (seasons 1, 3): an FBI agent
- Sam Gilroy as Michael Dimonda (seasons 1–2): a financial reporter
- David Cromer as Donald "Donnie" Caan (season 1): a trader at Axe Capital who is also Bryan Connerty's informant
- Melissa Errico as June Raichlein (season 1): married to one of Axelrod's colleagues who died in the September 11 attacks
- Steven Pasquale as Chase (season 1): a headhunter who works with Wendy
- Anthony Edwards as Judge Whit Wilcox (season 1): a corrupt judge who sent minorities to jail for profits from his personally invested private jails
- Danny Strong as Todd Krakow (seasons 2–7): a hedge fund rival of Axelrod's and as of season 3, the new Secretary of Treasury. Resigns from Treasury Department in season 5. Teams with Mike Prince for Olympics bid in season 6
- Dhruv Maheshwari as Tuk Lal (seasons 4–7): Ben Kim’s close coworker. Defunded by Mike Prince in season 6
- Matt Servitto as Bob Sweeney (seasons 2–7): the New York Governor who was elected thanks to Chuck's influence
- Allan Havey as Karl Allard (seasons 2–7): Assistant United States Attorney of the Eastern District of New York sent to the Southern District of New York as Chuck's owed favor; follows Chuck to State Attorney's office in season 4
- Clara Wong as Mistress Troy (seasons 1–7): a professional dominatrix whom Chuck and Wendy sometimes visit
- Alba Albanese as Mistress Cassie (season 4): another professional dominatrix whom Chuck sometimes visits with Wendy's permission
- Gia Crovatin as McKayla (seasons 2–4)
- David Strathairn as "Black" Jack Foley (seasons 2–4): a power player in the New York State political arena; considered a king maker
- Chris Carfizzi as Rudy (seasons 2–4): a rookie trader at Axe Capital
- Eric Bogosian as Lawrence Boyd (seasons 2–3, 5): CEO of investment bank Spartan Ives who gets Bobby Axelrod arrested in season 2 for his role in sabotaging the Ice Juice product launch and initial public offering
- Christopher Denham as Oliver Dake (seasons 2–3): an official misconduct investigator and later United States Attorney for the Eastern District of New York. Fired by Jock Jeffcoat in season 3, he becomes a law professor at University of Virginia.
- Marc Kudisch as Dr. Gus (seasons 2, 4): a therapist who works at Axe Capital during Wendy's absence
- Shaunette Renée Wilson as Stephanie Reed (season 2): Axe Capital's Chief of Staff, hired to protect Axelrod from more trouble with the government
- Ellen Adair as Graff (season 2): a portfolio manager at Axe Capital.
- Mary-Louise Parker as George Minchak (season 2): a specialist in candidate-vetting for Foley
- Richard Thomas as Sanford Bensinger (season 2): American Champion founder of the Giving fund, which encourages the giving of wealth assets to be used for the greater good of the world
- Ritchie Coster as Donald Thayer (season 2)
- James Wolk as Craig Heidecker (season 2)
- Tammy Blanchard as Melanie (season 2)
- Will Roland as Winston (seasons 3–7): Taylor's snarky lead quantitative analyst
- Sarah Stiles as Bonnie Barella (seasons 3–6): a new trader at Axe Capital. Quits Michael Prince Capital in season 6
- Clancy Brown as Waylon "Jock" Jeffcoat (seasons 3–4, 7): Attorney General of the United States
- Harris Yulin as Judge Funt (seasons 3–4): owes Chuck a favor for keeping his son's medical career alive and not sending him to jail for misusing his prescription pad for his own drug addiction
- John Malkovich as Grigor Andolov (seasons 3–4, 7): a Russian oil billionaire, a ruthless criminal in Eastern Europe protected by various authoritarian governments
- Mike Birbiglia as Oscar Langstraat (seasons 3, 5): a disruptive impact venture capitalist who has a fling with Taylor Mason. He pulls his funds from Axe Capital in season 5 after Taylor Mason rejoins Axe Capital.
- Saul Rubinek as Hap Halloran (seasons 4–7)
- Jade Eshete as Lauren Turner (seasons 4–7): an investor relations employee for Taylor Mason Capital
- Samantha Mathis as Sara Hammon (seasons 4–7): COO of Taylor Mason Capital
- Lily Gladstone as Roxanne (seasons 4–5, 7), a Native American woman with whom Chuck Rhoades Sr. fathers a child, then marries
- Nina Arianda as Rebecca Cantu (season 4): a billionaire financier and businesswoman who dates Bobby, grew up in small town Iowa
- Michael Rispoli as Ritchie Sansome (season 4): an NYPD Captain who trades favors with Chuck
- Kevin Pollak as Douglas Mason (season 4): Taylor's Father
- Eva Victor as Rian (seasons 5–7): Works closely with and for Taylor Mason
- Julianna Margulies as Catherine Brant (season 5): an Ivy League sociology professor and bestselling author
- Roma Maffia as Mary Ann Gramm (season 5): District Attorney of Manhattan
- Rick Hoffman as Dr. Swerdlow (season 5–7): a medical man with unorthodox methods
- Wendie Malick as Leah Calder (season 5): an NY banking official
- Janeane Garofalo as Dawn Winslow (season 5)
- Zachary Unger as Kevin Rhoades (seasons 1–5)
- Alexa Swinton as Eva Rhoades (seasons 1–5)
- Frank Grillo as Nico Tanner (season 5): a modern artist whom Axelrod funds for 8 more paintings for himself
- Ilfenesh Hadera as Deb Kawa (seasons 1–2): Bobby Axelrod's personal assistant and Dudley Mafee's girlfriend
- Piper Perabo as Mike Prince's wife Andy (seasons 6–7)
- Melina Kanakaredes as Governor Nancy Dunlop (season 7)
- Ruben Santiago-Hudson as Raul Gomez (seasons 1–4, 7): head of the New York police pension fund and early investor in Axe Capital

== Episodes ==
Season	Episodes		Originally released		
Season	Episodes		First released	Last released	Network
1	12		January 17, 2016	April 10, 2016	Showtime
2	12		February 19, 2017	May 7, 2017	Showtime
3	12		March 25, 2018	June 10, 2018	Showtime
4	12		March 17, 2019	June 9, 2019	Showtime
5	12	7	May 3, 2020	June 14, 2020	Showtime
5	12	5	September 5, 2021	October 3, 2021	Showtime
6	12		January 23, 2022	April 10, 2022	Showtime
7 (Note: Episodes were released two days later on Showtime.)	12		August 11, 2023	October 27, 2023	Paramount+ with Showtime

== Production ==
=== Development ===
The series was ordered by Showtime in March 2015, and the first season premiered January 17, 2016. On January 26, 2016, the series was renewed for a second season, which premiered on February 19, 2017. Showtime confirmed in April 2017 that Asia Kate Dillon, who is non-binary, would be a series regular in the third season. Billions is considered to be the first American TV series to have a non-binary character.

Preet Bharara, the inspiration for U.S. Attorney Chuck Rhodes who was portrayed by Paul Giamatti, was somewhat critical of Giamatti's casting – jokingly referring to the Italian American actor as "noted Indian American actor Paul Giamatti".

On May 8, 2019, the series was renewed for a fifth season by Showtime, which premiered on May 3, 2020. On October 1, 2020, Showtime renewed the series for a sixth season and Corey Stoll was promoted to series regular. On February 15, 2022, Showtime renewed the series for a seventh and final season.

In February 2023, Showtime announced that several spinoffs of the series were in development, including series set in London and Miami, and a series with the working title "Millions" featuring "diverse, thirty-something financial mogul wannabes" in Manhattan. Paramount executive Brian Robbins referred to the potential spin-offs at a June 2024 shareholder meeting, but the Wall Street Journal reported in November 2024 that while a script for the Miami spin-off had been delivered, it did not get a green light and that the plans for the other spin-offs had been dropped, as the LA Times also confirmed in 2025.

=== Broadcast ===
The first episode was made available on January 1, 2016, via video on demand services in the U.S. and via CraveTV in Canada. It premiered on Stan in Australia on January 27, 2016, and in Canada on The Movie Network on January 17, 2016, simultaneous with the American broadcast.

=== Depiction of BDSM ===
The show captured the attention of the BDSM community, as it features numerous depictions of BDSM activity, and the two main characters of Charles "Chuck" Rhoades, Jr and his wife Wendy Rhoades engage in BDSM scenes numerous times in the early seasons of the show. In addition, season 4 of the show depicts the character of Chuck Rhoades coming out as a practitioner of BDSM in a public political speech. The show's producers retained the services of noted BDSM lifestyle expert Olivia Troy as a consultant to help ensure the activities are portrayed both accurately and safely.

== Reception ==
=== Critical response ===
Critical response of Billions
Season	Rotten Tomatoes	Metacritic
1	78% (135 reviews)	69 (37 reviews)
2	89% (98 reviews)	67 (6 reviews)
3	93% (108 reviews)	77 (5 reviews)
4	97% (114 reviews)	87 (4 reviews)
5	91% (11 reviews)	73 (6 reviews)
6	100% (5 reviews)	tbd (2 reviews)
7	60% (6 reviews)	62 (4 reviews)

On Rotten Tomatoes, the series holds an overall approval rating of 86%, with a rating of 78% for season 1, 89% for season 2, 93% for season 3, 97% for season 4, 91% for season 5, 100% for season 6, and 60% for season 7. The site's critical consensus for the first season reads: "Despite a lack of likable characters, Billions' soapy melodrama and larger-than-life canvas offer plenty of repeat viewing potential." For season 2 it reads: "An influx of new characters and a fresh narrative twist give Billions an added boost during its thoroughly entertaining second season." The site's critical consensus for the third season states: "Anchored by the performances of Paul Giamatti and Damian Lewis, the third season of Billions continues a convincing fable of greed, power and competition." On Rotten Tomatoes, the fourth season reads, "With tables turned and alliances formed, Billions's fourth season goes full throttle with sharp dialogue, better rivalries, and bigger stakes."

On Metacritic, the show has an overall score of 71. The first season has a weighted average score of 69 out of 100, based on reviews from 37 critics, indicating "generally favorable reviews", while the second season has a score of 67 out of 100, based on reviews from 6 critics, also indicating "generally favorable reviews". Praise for the series has steadily grown over time—also on Metacritic, its third season scored a 77 out of 100, while its fourth holds a score of 87 out 100 based on reviews from 4 critics, indicating "universal acclaim". The show's coverage of the hedge fund industry has been widely recognized as realistic.

In 2017, after introducing Taylor Mason (played by Asia Kate Dillon) in season 2, Billions became the first American TV series to have a non-binary character and actor. The series received positive comments for its representation of non-binary gender, with praise for its depiction of inclusion of gender-neutral singular they pronouns in the workplace. Billions was nominated multiple times for the GLAAD Media Award for Outstanding Drama Series for their representation of the LGBTQ community.

=== Accolades ===
Year	Award	Category	Recipient(s)	Result	Ref.
2017	Satellite Awards	Best Supporting Actress in a Series, Miniseries, or Television Film	Maggie Siff	Nominated	
2017	Artios Awards	Outstanding Achievement in Casting – Television Pilot and First Season – Drama	Allison Estrin; Avy Kaufman; Melissa Moss	Nominated	
2017	Golden Nymph Awards	Outstanding Drama Series	Billions	Nominated	
2018	Critics' Choice Television Awards	Best Actor in a Drama Series	Paul Giamatti	Nominated	
2018	Critics' Choice Television Awards	Best Supporting Actor in a Drama Series	Asia Kate Dillon	Nominated	
2018	GLAAD Media Awards	Outstanding Drama Series	Billions	Nominated	
2019	GLAAD Media Awards	Outstanding Drama Series	Billions	Nominated	
2019	Satellite Awards	Best Actor in a Drama / Genre Series	Damian Lewis	Nominated	
2019	Satellite Awards	Best Actress in a Drama / Genre Series	Maggie Siff	Nominated	
2020	GLAAD Media Awards	Outstanding Drama Series	Billions	Nominated	
2021	Satellite Awards	Best Television Series – Drama	Billions	Nominated	
2021	Satellite Awards	Best Actor in a Drama / Genre Series	Damian Lewis	Nominated	
2021	Satellite Awards	Best Actress in a Drama / Genre Series	Maggie Siff	Nominated	
2023	Satellite Awards	Best Television Series – Drama	Billions	Won	

== Lawsuits ==
Billions has faced two lawsuits regarding both copyright infringement and defamation.

The first, brought by Denise Shull and the ReThink group in 2019, alleged that Billions ripped off Shull's book and based character "Wendy Rhoades" on her likeness. She also argued that Billions engaged her as a consultant on the show, but did not compensate or credit her for her time, as Shull claimed is illustrated in a released video. The case was dismissed and appealed. In July 2021, the U.S. Court of Appeals for the Second Circuit affirmed a lower court's decision to dismiss the suit, saying that Shull's book and the show are not substantially similar.

The second, brought by the Cayuga Nation in 2020, argued that Billions defamed both the nation and its federal representative. In the show, the nation is depicted engaging in acts such as the illegal operation of a casino business, blackmail, and bribery. One of the Cayuga characters featured on the show had the same last name and occupation as a real-life member. The case was dismissed.

== See also ==
- Gary J. Aguirre, an SEC regulator who struggled to prosecute a politically connected hedge-fund manager
- Prosecutorial career of Preet Bharara
