= Branko Pintarič =

Slovene writer, actor and theatre organizer

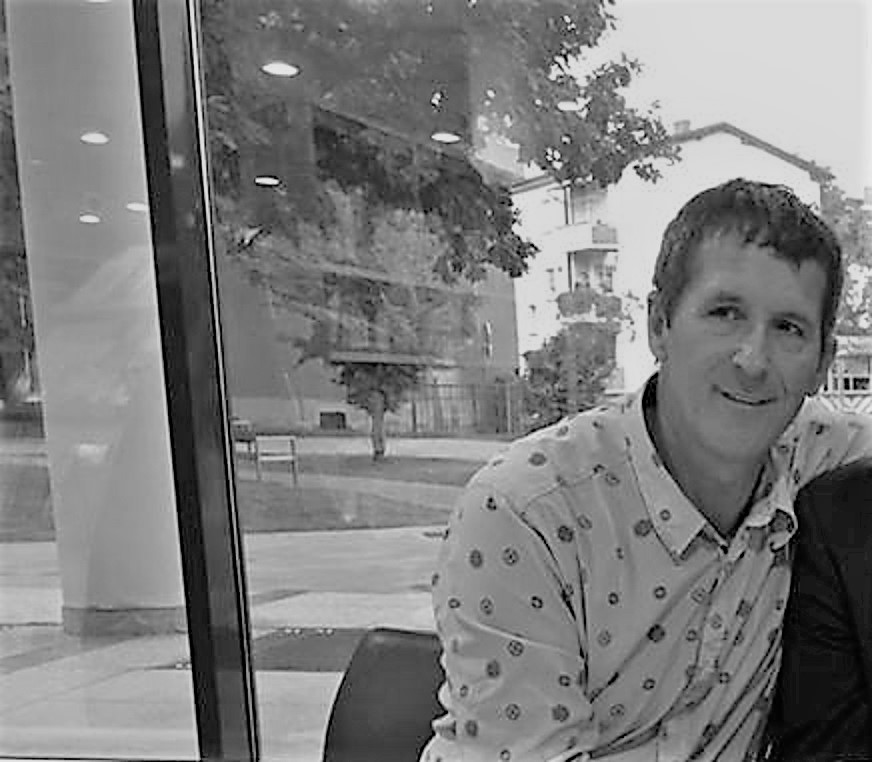
Branko Pintarič in Murska Sobota (2018)

Branko Pintarič (born March 30, 1967) is a Slovene writer, actor, and theatre organizer.

He was born in Murska Sobota, in the Prekmurje region, and raised in Rogašovci. He attended high school in Murska Sobota, and later studied philosophy at university. Pintarič organized theatrical groups in the Prekmurje region and in Hungary, and he wrote plays primarily in Prekmurje Slovene. In 2007, he published a book for children in the Prekmurje dialect and standard Slovene titled Kak so šli v lejs trejbit / Kako so šli drvarit (How They Went to Cut Wood). In 2012 published his Prekmurje dialect poems Kmični smej / Temni smeh (Dark Laughter).

In 2008, he stated in the newspaper Večer: "For me, Prekmurje Slovene is not dialect but a distinct language." Pintarič seeks to promote and preserve the Prekmurje dialect.

== Works ==
- Kak so šli v lejs trejbit / Kako so šli drvarit (How They Went to Cut Wood, 2007)
- Kmični smej / Temni smeh (Dark Laughter, 2012)

== See also ==
- List of Slovenian actors

== Literature ==
- Marija Stanonik: Slovenska narečna književnost, Maribor Slavistično društvo, 2007
