= Idila =

- Directed by: Tomaž Gorkič
- Written by: Tomaž Gorkič
- Produced by: Zoran Dževerdanović
- Starring: Nina Ivanišin; Lotos Vincenc Šparovec; Nika Rozman; Sebastian Cavazza
- Release date: 16 May 2015 (Cannes 2015)
- Running time: 83 minutes
- Country: Slovenia
- Language: Slovene

Idila is a 2015 Slovenian horror, action and thriller film written and directed by Tomaž Gorkič and produced by Zoran Dževerdanović. It is the first Slovenian feature film created in the horror genre. It had its world premiere on May 16, 2015 at the Cannes International Film Festival.

Most of the film was shot in the Jezersko region and a small part in the Soča region.

== Cast ==
- Nina Ivanišin as Zina
- Sebastian Cavazza as Blitcz
- Lotos Vincenc Šparovec as Franc
- Jurij Drevenšek as Vintrl
- Nika Rozman as Mia
- Manca Ogorevc as Dragica
- Damjana Černe as Enooka
- Damir Leventič as Renc

== See also ==
- List of Slovenian films
- List of horror films of 2015
