= Slovenian Girl =

2009 film directed by Damjan Kozole

- Slovenian theatrical release poster
- Slovene: Slovenka
- Directed by: Damjan Kozole
- Written by: Ognjen Sviličić; Matevž Luzar; Damjan Kozole
- Produced by: Danijel Hočevar
- Starring: Nina Ivanišin; Peter Musevski; Primož Pirnat; Maruša Kink; Uroš Fürst; Andrej Murenc; Aljoša Kovačič; Dejan Spasić
- Cinematography: Aleš Belak
- Edited by: Andrija Zafranović; Jurij Moškon
- Music by: Silence
- Production companies: Vertigo/Emotionfilm; Neue Mediopolis Filmproduktion; RTV Slovenija; Filmska Kuća Baš Čelik; 4 Film; FS Viba; E-Film
- Distributed by: Cinemania Group (Slovenia); Farbfilm Verleih (Germany); Cinears (Serbia)
- Release dates: 18 August 2009 (Sarajevo Film Festival); 30 September 2009 (Slovenia); 30 September 2010 (Serbia); 21 June 2012 (Germany)
- Running time: 90 minutes
- Countries: Slovenia; Germany; Serbia; Croatia; Bosnia and Herzegovina
- Languages: Slovenian; English

Slovenian Girl (Slovene: Slovenka; released in the United States as A Call Girl) is a 2009 drama film directed by Damjan Kozole. It stars Nina Ivanišin as Aleksandra, a 23-year-old Slovenian who leads a double life as a respectable student and a call girl. The film premiered at the 2009 Sarajevo Film Festival in Bosnia and Herzegovina before being released theatrically in more than 30 countries, including the United States.

According to Shaz Bennett of Moving Pictures, "the film is ultimately a fascinating study of free enterprise in free fall. In this mesmerizing chamber piece, director Damjan Kozole has contrived a new style of narrative to convey a view of capitalist culture at once outrageous and non-judgmental."

== Premise ==
Set in Ljubljana, Slovenia, in 2008, during the Slovenian presidency of the European Union, Aleksandra is a 23-year-old English-language student who comes from a small town. Her parents are divorced and she hardly sees her mother. Neither her friends nor her family knows that Aleksandra runs personal ads under the nickname Slovenka ("Slovenian girl"), and that prostitution is her secret source of income.

Aleksandra is very good at manipulating others (including her father and ex-boyfriend); she is an accomplished liar, and also a bit of a thief. She resents her mother and regards her as being selfish. Her ambition is to escape the banality of her hometown and settle in the big city in style, which necessitates her lucrative clandestine job. But that occupation leads her to a confrontation with dangerous local criminals, and suddenly she must live in fear as she struggles to maintain her income.

== Cast ==
- Nina Ivanišin as Aleksandra
- Peter Musevski as Edo

== Festivals ==
The film was screened at more than 70 international film festivals including Sarajevo Film Festival, Toronto International Film Festival, London Raindance, Montreal, Pusan, Warsaw, Valencia, São Paulo, Cairo, Thessaloniki, Les Arcs, Palm Springs, Gothenburg, Rotterdam International Film Festival, Chicago, New York, Edinburgh, Jerusalem, Cinessonne Paris.

== Critical reception ==
Alissa Simon of Variety referred to the title character as "one of the most coolly calculating antiheroines to grace the silver screen." Daily Film Dose says the film "is a resolutely grim, haunting, beautifully crafted and powerfully acted story of a young woman. This is a heart-breaking movie." For Film Monthly, "a Call Girl is an exciting movie to experience because it is a film that seems to value character over plot, and substance over style. With a elegantly written script that creates real three-dimensional characters, and a sparse aesthetic style, director Damjan Kozole's affecting character study creates a distinctive mood that is hard to shake off.” The French newspaper Le Figaro says, "lie by lie, the heroine is becoming more appealing, thanks to the incredible performance of Nina Ivanišin. It is she who carries the film, and thanks to her the film is a 'must see.'" According to Moving Pictures Magazine, "Slovenian Girl is a haunting meditation on capitalism and the world's oldest profession", while Mike Goodridge in Screen Daily says "it's a clever metaphor for the dubious values of capitalism and personal gain which have spread fast through the new Europe."

== Awards ==
- Grand Prix - Best film at the 2012 Girona Film Festival, Spain
- Best director Award at the 2012 Girona Film Festival, Spain
- Best screenplay Award at the 2012 Girona Film Festival, Spain
- Best actress Award at the 2012 Girona Film Festival, Spain
- European Film Academy, in selection for the best European film 2010
- Prix du Public at the 2010 Festival du cinéma européen in Essonne, France
- Best actress Award at the 2010 Festival du cinéma européen in Essonne, France
- Best actress Award at the 2009 Mostra de València, Spain
- Best actress Award at the 2009 Les Arcs European Film Festival, France
