= Bread and Milk =

2001 film by Jan Cvitkovič

Bread and Milk (Slovene: Kruh in mleko) is a 2001 Slovene film directed by Jan Cvitkovič. It was Slovenia's submission to the 74th Academy Awards for the Academy Award for Best Foreign Language Film, but was not accepted as a nominee.

== See also ==
- List of submissions to the 74th Academy Awards for Best Foreign Language Film
