= Sebastian Cavazza =

Slovenian actor

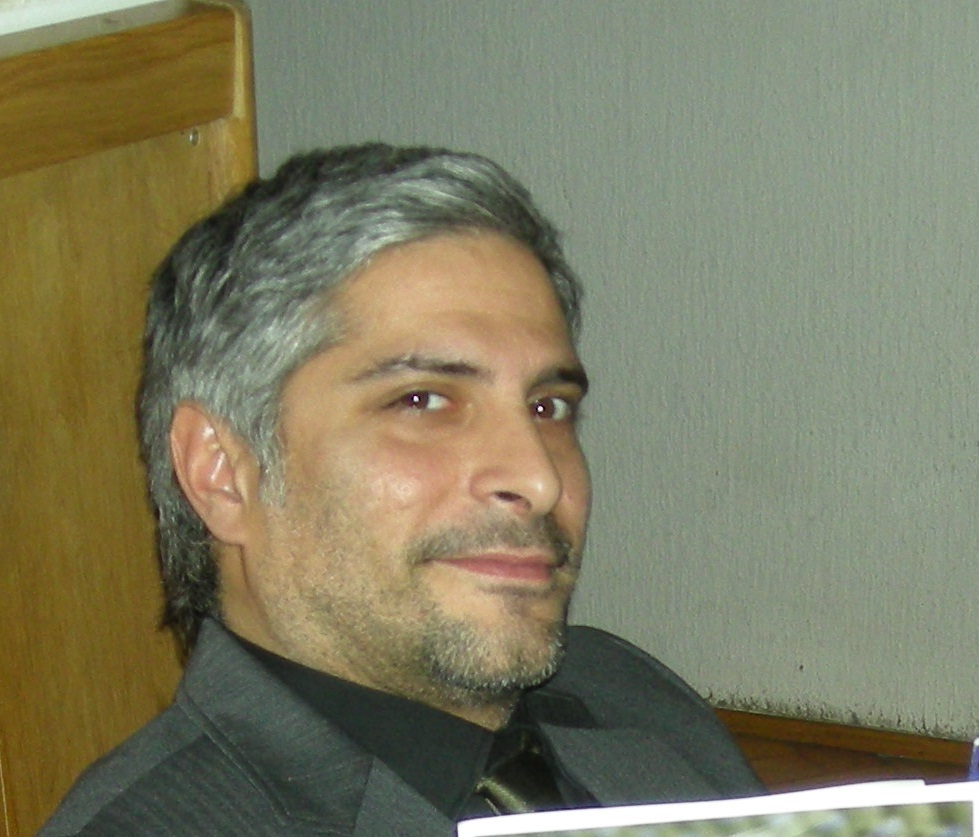
- Born: 19 March 1973 (age 53); Kranj, SR Slovenia, SFR Yugoslavia
- Occupations: Movie and theater actor
- Years active: 1991–present

Sebastian Cavazza (born 18 March 1973) is a Slovenian actor. He has appeared in more than thirty films since 1991.

== Selected filmography ==
Year	Title	Role	Notes
2010	On the Path		
2012	Halima's Path	Planinšek	
2012	Lea and Darija		
2015	Idila	Blitcz	
2015	You Carry Me		
2015	Kill Billies	Blitzc	
2017	Men Don't Cry		
2017	Shadows over Balkan	Gabriel Maht	TV series
2018	A.I. Rising	Milutin	
2023	Na vlnách Jadranu	Zoran Radnič	TV series Czech TV
