= Nina Ivanišin =

Slovenian actress

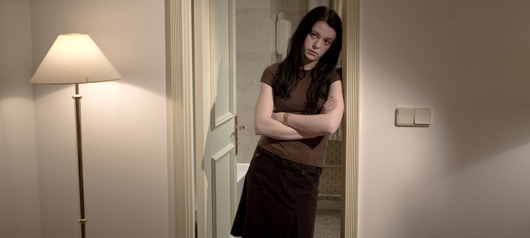
- Nina in Slovenka (2009)
- Born: 1985 (age 40–41); Maribor, SR Slovenia, Yugoslavia
- Citizenship: Slovenian
- Education: University of Ljubljana
- Occupation: Actress
- Partner: Klemen Janežič (2018–present)

Nina Ivanišin is a Slovenian film and theatre actress. She was born in 1985 in Maribor, Slovenia. She graduated from Ljubljana Film and Theatre Academy (AGRFT).

Ivanišin has starred in several Slovenian and foreign movies and is a member of Ljubljana Slovene National Theatre Drama. She has won several awards vor her performances, including best actress at the Slovenia Film Festival (2010, for Piran-Pirano), and at the Girona Film Festival (2012, for Slovenian Girl).

In 2017 to 2019, she appeared in 10 episodes of the TV series "V Dvoje".

She is married to Klemen Janežič.

== Filmography ==
=== Film ===
Year	Title	Director	Role	Notes
2007	Instalacija ljubezni	Maja Weiss	Saleswoman	
2007	Agape	Slobodan Maksimovic		Short film
2009	Slovenian Girl	Damjan Kozole	Aleksandra	
2010	Just Between Us	Rajko Grlić	Davorka	
2010	Piran-Pirano	Goran Vojnović	Anica	
2011	The Wind Inside Me	Boris Bezic	Fantasy	Short film
2013	Na Pogled	Miha f Kalan	Sasa	Short film
2014	Kaj pa Mojca?	Ursa Menart	Herself	Documentary
2015	Idila	Tomaž Gorkič	Zina	
2016	Nisi Pozabil	Simon Intihar	Bartender	Short film
2016	Srecno, Orlo!	Sara Kern	Orlo's Mum	Short film
2016	Pod gladino	Klemen Dvornik	Jana Kranjc	
2017	BUH: Spring Whispers	Enya Belak Gupta	Woman	Video short
2019	Trenutek	Matic Stamcar	Ana	Video short
2020	Portreti Presernovih nagrajencev	Spela Kuclar	Herself	Documentary

=== TV Series ===
Year	Title	Role	Notes
2016	Usodno vino	Dasa Rozman	Episode #2.7
2017	Od blizu	Antigora	Episode Jurij Zrnec
2017	V dvoje	Spela	10 Episodes

== Awards ==
Year	Association	Category	Work	Result
2009	Mostra de Valencia, Spain	Best Actress	Slovenka	Won
2009	Les Arcs European Film Festival, France	Best Actress	Slovenka	Won
2010	Festival du cinéma européen, France	Best Actress	Slovenka	Won
2010	Slovenian Film Festival	Best Actress	Piran-Pirano	Won
2012	Girona Film Festival, Spain	Best Actress	Slovenka	Won
