= Dušan Žanko =

Dušan Žanko (10 November 1904 – 23 January 1980) was a Croatian writer, professor, diplomat and the intendant of the Croatian National Theatre in Zagreb during the Nazi puppet state Independent State of Croatia, from 1941 to 1943, when he published the text "Ethical basis of the Ustasha movement" as the foundation for clean-up of unwanted repertoire and personnel in the theater.

Žanko was born in Trilj, at the time Kingdom of Dalmatia, and graduated from the Franciscan Classical Gymnasium in Široki Brijeg in 1924. During this time he was a member of the Croatian Falcon Association (Hrvatski sokol). He graduated in history from the University of Zagreb in 1928. He subsequently worked as a gymnasium professor in Zagreb. In the 1930s he was one of the leaders of the Crusader Brotherhood in Croatia, and was also active in Catholic Action.

During World War II, when the Independent State of Croatia was formed, Žanko was named the intendant of the Croatian National Theatre in Zagreb (Croatian: Hrvatsko državno kazalište) on 22 April 1941. During his time in office, he led Zagreb's opera company on performances in Venice, Florence and Rome in April 1942 and to Vienne in 1943. In January 1943, Bucharest's opera singers guested at the theatre, performing Aida and Carmen.

At the beginning of his term, in agreement with minister of worship and education Mile Budak, he devised a plan to purge the repertoire and staff in the theater of "Serbianism, Yugoslavism, Judaism, Freemasonry, Leninism and the old sick liberalism", which made the position of Jews in the national theater particularly difficult. In his publication Etička osnova ustaštva (Ethical basis of the Ustasha movement) Jews were called "pernicious parasites who turned art into ordinary debauchery". Members of the theater who were of non-Croatian origin or were married non-Croats had to fill out "Statements of racial affiliation". Many artists were fired from the theater, unless they had special protection from the Ustaša authorities. Early into his term, Žanko moved into the villa of Jewish industrialist Dragan Klaić (Klajn), whose fate remains unknown. Serbs who wanted to stay in the theater converted to Catholicism or the Greek Catholic faith. According to Snježana Banović, a researcher of the theater's WWII history, the theater also played the role of an Ustasha propaganda machine. When a number of the actors fled to the partisans, Žanko requested a list of political suspects in the theater from the Ustasha police, which included the greats of Branko Gavella, Tito Strozzi and others.

His theatre appointment ended on 8 November 1943, he was sent by the Ministry of Foreign Affairs as a cultural-economic representative to France.

On 6 May 1945 Žanko left Zagreb as the Independent State of Croatia evacuation to Austria was starting. He spent the next few years at the displaced persons camp near Fermo, Italy whose inhabitants were more of 2000 Croats displaced from Yugoslavia. On 4 October 1946 the Yugoslav communist government requested his return to face trial, but the request was never carried out. In 1948 he moved to Argentina, before settling in Venezuela in 1954.

In emigration he was active in the magazine Hrvatska revija and was president of the printing house Zajednica izdanja Ranjeni labud. At the Catholic University Andrés Bello, Caracas, he taught the "History of the Ideas" (from 1954 to 1956) and worked as a librarian. Since 1961 he was a professor of humanities at the Central University of Venezuela and at the Agronomy Faculty in Maracay, where he has taught bibliographic documentation and technical communication.

He attended the canonization of Nikola Tavelić in Rome on 21 June 1970. Žanko attended the founding of the Croatian National Council in Toronto in 1974 and remained a member of the organization until his death. He died in Caracas.

In the bibliography of prof. Žanko's works there are about 80 theatrical reviews, reviews and presentations, 76 literary reviews and reviews, 36 articles of religious content, 36 essays, 87 other articles, three songs and three books. For his work and contribution to the development of the country, Venezuelan President Carlos Andrés Pérez was honored in 1978 by the star of the Order of Francisco de Miranda 2nd Class.

Žanko is memorialized with a plaque and a bust in the town of Sinj, Croatia, along with five other notable townsmen.

== Sources ==
- Svjedoci: domovinsko izdanje. Knjižnica Hrvatske revije. Zagreb, 1998.
- Zbornik radova o skupu Povratak Dušana Žanka u zavičaj. Sinj, 1995.
