= Shaz Bennett =

American writer and filmmaker

Shaz Bennett is an American writer, filmmaker, performance artist and film programmer.

== Personal life ==
Bennett was born in Salt Lake City, Utah, to a mother who was a journalist for the Associated Press and a father who ran a leasing company and now owns Squashworks, a Squash club in Salt Lake City. She lives in Los Angeles with her husband filmmaker Jean-Pierre Caner. Bennett studied acting at the University of Utah in Salt Lake City. Her popular performances and award winning films have been screened in theatres, museums, and abandoned warehouses around the USA and in Mexico, Canada, Europe.

== Performance art ==
While living in New York in the early '90s she studied with Spaulding Gray and wrote & performed four one-woman shows: "The Shaz Show," "Abrasive Fairy Tales," "Eyes, Lips, Legs," and "Hungover Angel." In addition to New York these shows have been performed extensively across the country, Mexico and Europe and as part of several spoken word tours sponsored by MTV, Hennessey and NOW. Her pieces have been performed in Museums, Universities, theatres and abandoned warehouses. She performs frequently with the Heroine Addicts, The Moth, Third Saturdays, A Shot and a Beer, and Sit n Spin at The Comedy Central Stage.

== Writing ==
Bennett has written numerous short stories, several screenplays, and has developed a television pilot based on the material she performs. Her essays have been published in Cake Magazine, Imaging Ourselves, “Best Monologues for Women” and in the upcoming book "Dirty Laundry".

== Filmmaking ==
Bennett wrote and starred in the award winning short films "Martini” and "Tunnels," an official selection of The Los Angeles Film Festival and Cinevegas. Her new film "Top of the Circle," screened at over 50 film festivals including, The Los Angeles Film Festival, The True West Cinema Festival, Silverdocs, Lunafest and at the International Women’s Museum.

== Film festival programming and writing ==
Bennett started working at the US Film Festival that ultimately became the Sundance Film Festival. She worked for the Sundance Institute both in Utah and Los Angeles from 1989-1997. She also worked at the Los Angeles Film Festival and the San Francisco Film Festivals. She was the Assoc. Director of Programming for the American Film Festival AFI FEST from 1999-2009. She contributes regularly to film blogs online and Moving Pictures Magazine.
