= 52nd Berlin International Film Festival =

2002 film festival in Berlin, Germany

- Festival poster
- Opening film: Heaven
- Closing film: The Great Dictator
- Location: Berlin, Germany
- Founded: 1951
- Awards: Golden Bear: Bloody Sunday; Spirited Away
- No. of films: 389 films
- Festival date: 6–17 February 2002
- Website: http://www.berlinale.de

Berlin International Film Festival chronology
- 53rd 51st

The 52nd annual Berlin International Film Festival was held from February 6 to 17, 2002. The festival opened with Heaven by Tom Tykwer. The new print of Charlie Chaplin's 1940 American satirical dramedy film The Great Dictator was the closing film of the festival.

The Golden Bear was jointly awarded to Bloody Sunday, directed by Paul Greengrass, and Spirited Away, by Hayao Miyazaki.

The Retrospective section was dedicated to European films from the 1960s. Dieter Kosslick became the director of the festival, taking over from Moritz de Hadeln.

== Juries ==
=== Main Competition ===
The following people were announced as being on the jury for the festival:

- Mira Nair, Indian filmmaker - Jury President
- Nicoletta Braschi, Italian actress
- Peter Cowie, British historian and writer
- Renata Litvinova, Russian actress and filmmaker
- Lucrecia Martel, Argentinian director and screenwriter
- Claudie Ossard, French producer
- Raoul Peck, Haitian filmmaker
- Declan Quinn, American cinematographer
- Oskar Roehler, German filmmaker and journalist
- Kenneth Turan, American professor and film critic

== Main Competition ==
The following films were in competition for the Golden Bear and Silver Bear awards:

English title	Original title	Director(s)	Country
8 Women	8 Femmes	François Ozon	France, Italy
Amen.		Costa-Gavras	France, Germany, Romania, United States
Baader		Christopher Roth	Germany, United Kingdom
Bad Guy	나쁜 남자	Kim Ki-duk	South Korea
Beneath Clouds		Ivan Sen	Australia
Bloody Sunday		Paul Greengrass	United Kingdom, Ireland
Burning in the Wind	Brucio nel vento	Silvio Soldini	Italy, Switzerland
Bridget		Amos Kollek	France, Japan
A Map of the Heart	Der Felsen	Dominik Graf	Germany
Grill Point	Halbe Treppe	Andreas Dresen	Germany
Heaven		Tom Tykwer	Germany, Italy, United States, France, United Kingdom
Iris		Richard Eyre	United States, United Kingdom
Minor Mishaps		Annette K. Olesen	Denmark
KT		Junji Sakamoto	South Korea
Safe Conduct	Laissez-passer	Bertrand Tavernier	France, Spain, Germany
Monster's Ball		Marc Forster	United States, Canada
Monday Morning	Lundi matin	Otar Iosseliani	France, Italy
Stones	Piedras	Ramón Salazar	Spain
The Royal Tenenbaums		Wes Anderson	United States
The Shipping News		Lasse Hallström	United States, Canada
Spirited Away	千と千尋の神隠し	Hayao Miyazaki	Japan
One Day in August	Δεκαπενταύγουστος	Constantine Giannaris	Greece
Temptations		Zoltán Kamondi	Hungary

== Retrospective - European 60s ==
2002 Retrospective poster, dedicated to European films from 1960s

The following films were shown in the retrospective:

English title	Original title	Director(s)	Country
491		Vilgot Sjöman	Sweden
8½	Otto e mezzo	Federico Fellini	Italy, France
Andrei Rublev	Андрей Рублёв	Andrei Tarkovsky	Soviet Union
Artists Under the Big Top: Perplexed	Die Artisten in der Zirkuskuppel: ratlos	Alexander Kluge	West Germany
The Assault of the Present on the Rest of Time	Der Angriff der Gegenwart auf die übrige Zeit	Alexander Kluge	West Germany
Aunt Tula	La Tía Tula	Miguel Picazo	Spain
Bandits of Orgosolo	Banditi a Orgosolo	Vittorio De Seta	Italy
Before the Revolution	Prima della rivoluzione	Bernardo Bertolucci	Italy
Billy Liar		John Schlesinger	United Kingdom
Black Peter	Černý Petr	Miloš Forman	Czechoslovakia
Blowup		Michelangelo Antonioni	United Kingdom
The Bread of Those Early Years	Das Brot der frühen Jahre	Herbert Vesely	West Germany
Cantata	Oldás és kötés	Miklós Jancsó	Hungary
Catch Us If You Can		John Boorman	United Kingdom
Charles, Dead or Alive	Charles mort ou vif	Alain Tanner	Switzerland
The Collector	La Collectionneuse	Eric Rohmer	France
Daisies	Sedmikrásky	Věra Chytilová	Czechoslovakia
The Departure	Le départ	Jerzy Skolimowski	Belgium
L'Eclisse		Michelangelo Antonioni	Italy, France
Early Works	Рани радови	Želimir Žilnik	Yugoslavia
The Fiances	I fidanzati	Ermanno Olmi	Italy
The Good Time Girls	Les Bonnes Femmes	Claude Chabrol	France, Italy
The Great Silence	Il Grande silenzio	Sergio Corbucci	Italy, France
The Green Year	Os Verdes Anos	Paulo Rocha	Portugal
Hunger	Sult	Henning Carlsen	Denmark
The Hunt	La caza	Carlos Saura	Spain
I Am Cuba	Soy Cuba	Mikhail Kalatozov	Soviet Union, Cuba
if....		Lindsay Anderson	United Kingdom
Identification Marks: None	Rysopis	Jerzy Skolimowski	Poland
Innocent Sorcerers	Niewinni czarodzieje	Andrzej Wajda	Poland
Intimate Lighting	Intimni osvetlení	Ivan Passer	Czechoslovakia
Knife in the Water	Nóż w wodzie	Roman Polanski	Poland
Left-Handed Fate	Fata Morgana	Vicente Aranda	Spain
Liv		Pål Løkkeberg	Norway
Love 65	Kärlek 65	Bo Widerberg	Sweden
Love Affair, or the Case of the Missing Switchboard Operator	Ljubavni slucaj ili Tragedija sluzbenice	Dušan Makavejev	Yugoslavia
Magical Mystery Tour		The Beatles	United Kingdom
The Milky Way	La via lattéa	Luis Buñuel	Spain, France
Mr. Freedom	Mr. Freedom	William Klein	France
The Murderers Are Among Us	Die Mörder sind unter uns	Wolfgang Staudte	Germany
Naked Childhood	L'Enfance nue	Maurice Pialat	France
Naked Hearts	Les Coeurs verts	Édouard Luntz	France
Nights on the Road	Nachts auf den Straßen	Rudolf Jugert	West Germany
Not Reconciled	Nicht versöhnt oder es hilft nur Gewalt, wo Gewalt herrscht	Jean-Marie Straub, Daniele Huillet	West Germany
Open Secrets	Yksityisalue	Maunu Kurkvaara	Finland
Paranoia		Adriaan Ditvoorst	Netherlands
Passenger	Pasażerka	Witold Lesiewicz, Andrzej Munk	Poland
Performance		Donald Cammell, Nicolas Roeg	United Kingdom
Persona		Ingmar Bergman	Sweden
Pierrot le Fou		Jean-Luc Godard	France, Italy
The Pier	La Jetée	Chris Marker	France
Raven's End	Kvarteret korpen	Bo Widerberg	Sweden
The Reenactment	Reconstituirea	Lucian Pintilie	Romania
The Sinner	Die Sünderin	Willi Forst	West Germany
The Subversives	I Sovversivi	Paolo Taviani, Vittorio Taviani	Italy
A Taste of Honey		Tony Richardson	United Kingdom
Thursday We Shall Sing Like Sunday	Jeudi on chantera comme dimanche	Luc de Heusch	Belgium, France
Trace of Stones	Spur der Steine	Frank Beyer	East Germany
Viva Maria!		Louis Malle	France, Italy
The War Is Over	La Guerre est finie	Alain Resnais	France, Sweden
Yesterday Girl	Abschied von gestern	Alexander Kluge	West Germany

== Official Awards ==
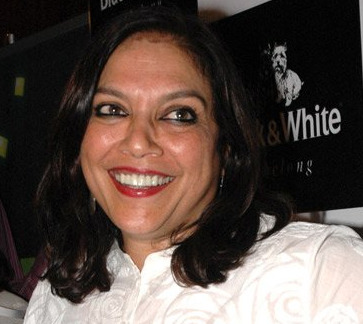
Mira Nair, Jury President

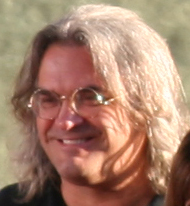
Paul Greengrass, winner of the Golden Bear at the festival

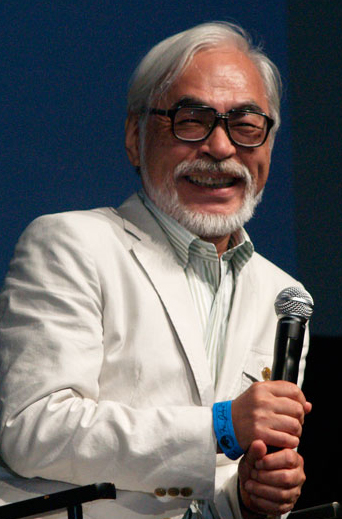
Hayao Miyazaki, winner of the Golden Bear at the festival

=== Main Competition ===
- Golden Bear:
  - Bloody Sunday by Paul Greengrass
  - Spirited Away by Hayao Miyazaki
- Silver Bear Special Jury Prize: Grill Point by Andreas Dresen
- Silver Bear for Best Director: Otar Iosseliani for Monday Morning
- Silver Bear for Best Actress: Halle Berry for Monster's Ball
- Silver Bear for Best Actor: Jacques Gamblin for Safe Conduct
- Silver Bear for Outstanding Artistic Contribution: Ensemble of actresses for 8 Women
- Silver Bear for Best Film Music: Antoine Duhamel for Safe Conduct
- Alfred Bauer Prize: Baader by Christopher Roth

=== Honorary Golden Bear ===
- Claudia Cardinale
- Robert Altman

=== Berlinale Camera ===
- Costa-Gavras
- Volker Hassemer
- Horst Wendlandt

== Independent Awards ==
=== Blue Angel Award ===
- Minor Mishaps by Annette K. Olesen

=== FIPRESCI Award ===
- Monday Morning by Otar Iosseliani
