= Yugoslav Black Wave =

Movement in Yugoslav cinema

- Poster advertising Želimir Žilnik's Early Works which prompted the publication of A Black Wave in Our Cinema, coining the movement's name
- Years active: Early 1960s to early 1970s
- Location: Yugoslavia
- Major figures: Dušan Makavejev, Žika Pavlović, Aleksandar Petrović, Želimir Žilnik, Mika Antić, Lordan Zafranović, Mića Popović
- Influences: French New Wave, Italian Neorealism, Czechoslovak New Wave, realism, 1968 student demonstrations in Yugoslavia

Yugoslav Black Wave (also referred to as Black Wave; Serbo-Croatian: Crni val / Црни вал or Crni talas / Црни талас) is a blanket term for a Yugoslav film and broader cultural movement starting from the early 1960s and ending in the early 1970s. Notable directors include Dušan Makavejev, Žika Pavlović, Aleksandar Petrović, Želimir Žilnik, Mika Antić, Lordan Zafranović, Mića Popović, Đorđe Kadijević and Marko Babac. Black Wave films are known for their non-traditional approach to filmmaking, dark humor and their critical examination of socialist Yugoslav society.

== History ==
Black Wave auteurs largely drew inspiration from similar trends in world cinematography, primarily the French New Wave, Italian Neorealism and the Czechoslovak New Wave. It was additionally inspired by 1968 student demonstrations in Yugoslavia, as well as other student and civil rights protests throughout the world. The filmmakers were linked by a common wish to increase the freedom of artistic expression, as well as the wish to openly criticize the policies of the socialist state. The liberalization of the film form and expression reached its peak in 1967–68.

In the following years, the counter-offensive against the new movement intensified. The films provoked a reaction from the ruling League of Communists of Yugoslavia, whose official newspaper Borba published an article written by Vladimir Jovičić titled Crni val u našem filmu (A Black Wave in Our Cinema) on August 3, 1969, which coined the movement's name. On October 27, 1969, the Commission of the Presidency of the League held a session regarding the "Conditions and Problems in Yugoslav Cinematography". A conclusion was reached that certain films have a tendency to be counter-revolutionary and degrading. Numerous films and other artworks were banned, with some directors being forced to leave the country.

On July 5, 1971, a large public discussion was held in Novi Sad about Dušan Makavejev's film W.R.: Mysteries of the Organism, where the film's portrayal of Stalin was criticized and groups feared that Josip Broz Tito would be the next subject of such criticism. The film was banned and sealed away for 15 years. Lazar Stojanović, director of the 1973 student film Plastic Jesus was imprisoned for "spreading enemy propaganda". In 1973 the Black Wave was officially banned and the so-called Red Wave appeared. Red Wave films, which were in complete opposition to the Black Wave, were primarily Partisan films: Battle of Neretva (1969), Walter Defends Sarajevo (1971), Battle of Sutjeska (1973), Guns of War (1974), Partisans (1974), Doctor Mladen (1975), Red Earth (1975), Partisan Squadron (1979), Great Transport (1983) and others. These events marked the end of the Black Wave and the beginning of the Years of Lead in Yugoslav cinematography, characterized by the stifling of creative freedoms in the country.

== Style and characteristics ==
Black Wave films, both fictional and documentary, largely criticized Yugoslav society and its socialist ideology, particularly government officials and the extent of their authority. They represent the opposite of classic socialist cultural aestheticism (most often seen in Partisan films) which depicted Yugoslavia's resistance movement during World War II and its postwar social and economic progress. Many Black Wave films featured a recontextualized view of Yugoslav Partisans and depicted them in a more realistic manner, such as Aleksandar Petrović's Three, whose protagonist's moral struggles and hopelessness in the face of war set the film apart from other representatives of the genre. Black Wave films focused on the everyday reality of regular people, individuals living in poverty, petty criminals, etc. One of the main characteristics of the movement was cinematic social realism, reminiscent of Italian neorealism and inspired by the French New Wave and other European movements of the period. Black Wave films were often independent, low-budget, filmed with hand-held cameras, contained explicit violence and nudity and featured actors who were largely unknown at the time (such as Dragan Nikolić, who had his breakthrough role in When I Am Dead and Gone). They are marked by a satirical overtone and extensively feature black comedy. Throughout the late 1960s and early 1970s, directors started taking on a more avant-garde approach to filmmaking and often utilized more surrealist and allegorical cinematic language. This approach is most notably seen in Dušan Makavejev's filmography of this period (Innocence Unprotected, W.R.: Mysteries of the Organism and Sweet Movie).

== Notable individuals and works ==
=== Film ===
Notable Black Wave filmmakers include Aleksandar Petrović, Živojin Pavlović, Đorđe Kadijević, Dušan Makavejev, Mića Popović, Lordan Zafranović, Želimir Žilnik, Lazar Stojanović, Ljubiša Kozomara, Gordan Mihić, Vojislav Kokan Rakonjac, Jovan Jovanović, Bahrudin Čengić and others.

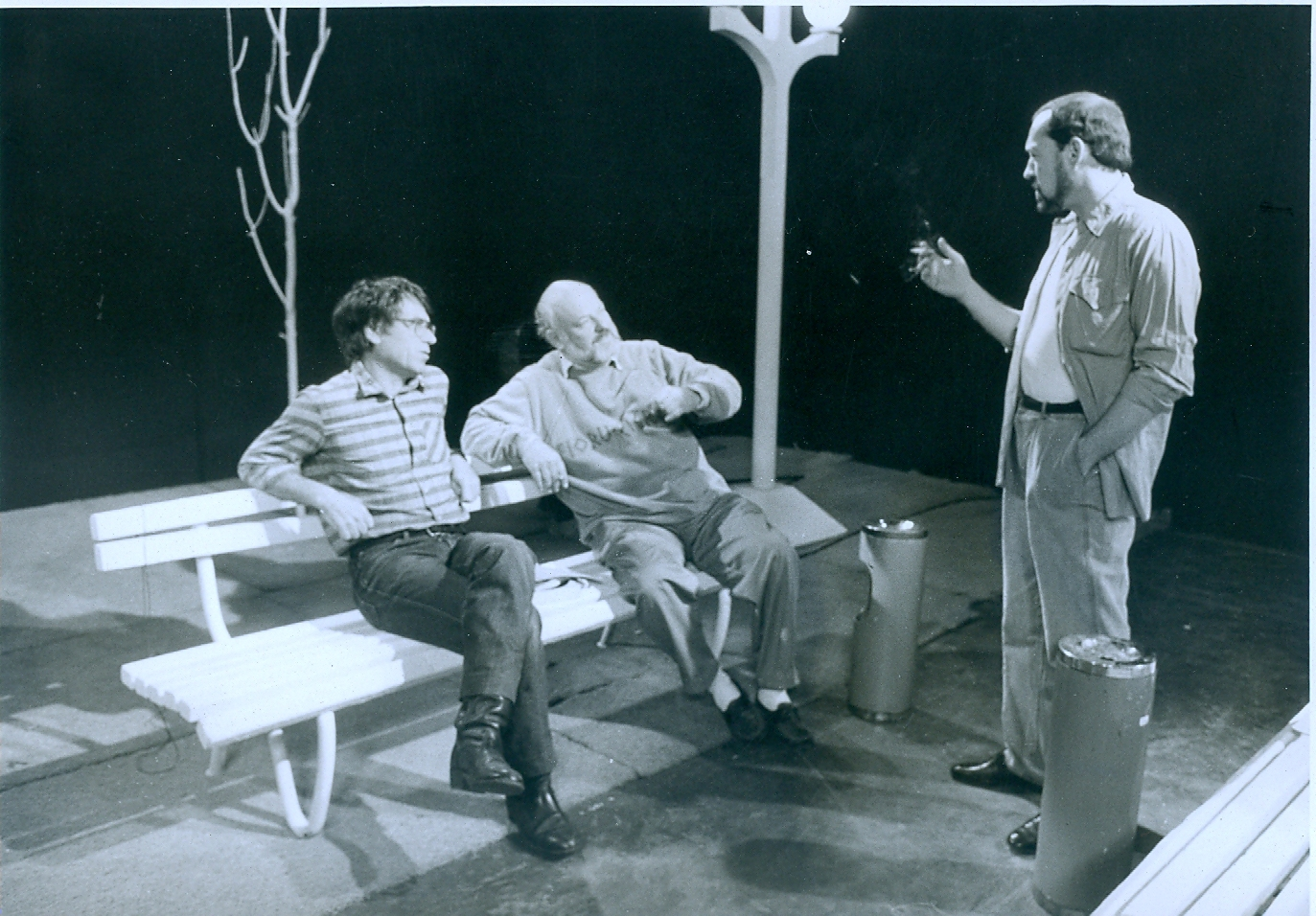
Želimir Žilnik (left) and Dušan Makavejev (middle) with film critic Ranko Munitić, 1989

Dušan Makavejev is considered to be among the most significant Black Wave filmmakers. His most successful film was the 1971 political satire W.R.: Mysteries of the Organism, which he wrote and directed. The film was banned and Makavejev fled the country, not working there again until 1988. He shot his surrealist political satire Sweet Movie (1974) in Canada, the Netherlands, and France.

Aleksandar "Saša" Petrović was another of the major figures of the Black Wave. He contributed to the popularization of the movement, both in Yugoslavia and abroad. Two of his works were nominated for the Academy Award for Best Foreign Language Film: Three (1965) in 1966 and I Even Met Happy Gypsies in 1967.

Želimir Žilnik's Early Works (1969) contains the typical characteristics of Black Wave films: unusual uses of film techniques, political and social concerns, a tendency towards oppositional ideology and a fatalistic climax. Žilnik's film prompted writer and journalist Vladimir Jovičić to write Crni val u našem filmu (A Black Wave in Our Cinema), published in Borba on August 3, 1969, which gave the movement its name.

Although the majority of Black Wave directors and films were Serbian, numerous Croatian filmmakers emerged, most notably Lordan Zafranović and Krsto Papić. A significant Croatian film of this era is Papić's Handcuffs (1969), the first film to take on a critical approach to the 1948 Tito-Stalin split.

Significant Black Wave films include:

- And Love Has Vanished (1961)
- Strange Girl (1962)
- Parade (1962)
- Days (1963)
- The Man from the Oak Forest (1963)
- The City (1963)
- Three (1965)
- Man Is Not a Bird (1965)
- The Enemy (1965)
- The Return (1966)
- The Swarm (1966)
- I Even Met Happy Gypsies (1967)
- The Rats Woke Up (1967)
- When I Am Dead and Gone (1967)
- The Feast (1967)
- Love Affair, or the Case of the Missing Switchboard Operator (1967)
- The Morning (1967)
- The Trek (1968)
- It Rains in My Village (1968)
- Innocence Unprotected (1968)
- The Unemployed (1968)
- The Tough Ones (1968)
- Do Not Mention the Cause of Death (1968)
- Noon (1968)
- Holy Sand (1968)
- The Ambush (1969)
- Handcuffs (1969)
- Early Works (1969)
- Crows (1969)
- Breakfast with the Devil (1969)
- Red Wheat (1970)
- W.R.: Mysteries of the Organism (1971)
- Plastic Jesus (1971)
- Black Film (1971)
- Young and Healthy as a Rose (1971)
- Salty Peanuts (1971)
- The Role of My Family in the World Revolution (1971)
- I Miss Sonia Henie (1972)
- Life of a Shock Force Worker (1972)
- The Master and Margaret (1972)
- And God Created a Tavern Singer (1972)
- Red Blow (1974)
- Sweet Movie (1974)
- Manhunt (1977)

=== Literature ===
Significant representatives of the Black Wave in literature are Mirko Kovač, Dragoslav Mihailović, Slobodan Selenić, Antonije Isaković, Milisav Savić, Vidosav Stevanović, Ivan Ivanović, Bogdan Tirnanić and others.

Significant literary works include:

- Gubilište (Mirko Kovač, 1962)
- Memoari jednog makroa (László Végel, 1967)
- Kad su cvetale tikve (Dragoslav Mihailović, 1968)
- Memoari Pere bogalja (Slobodan Selenić, 1968)
- Pismo/Glava (Slobodan Selenić, 1970)
- Crveni kralj (Ivan Ivanović, 1972)

== Accolades and legacy ==
Black Wave is one of the most successful and internationally recognized cinematic movements of Southeast Europe, besides the Romanian New Wave of the 2000s. Films from the wave won a plethora of international recognition, including a Golden Bear, Silver Bear for Best Director, Cannes Grand Prix, six nominations for Cannes Palme d'Or and four nominations for Academy Award for Best International Feature Film, with success continuing through directors emerging from the wave, including two Palme d'Or awards in 1980s and 1990s. Today, several of the films are considered classics of world cinema and were released as part of influential collections such as Criterion Collection in the United States. Film historian Mina Radovic presented the first international retrospective of the Yugoslav Black Wave at The Museum of Modern Art (MoMA) in New York in September 2023. The restored version of Bahrudin Čengić's 1972 film Life of a Shock Force Worker was nominated for the Best Restored Film at the 80th Venice Film Festival.

== See also ==
- Yugoslav cinema
- Czech New Wave
- Extreme cinema
- Counterculture of the 1960s

== Sources ==
- Goulding, Daniel J. (2002) [1985]. Liberated Cinema: The Yugoslav Experience, 1945-2001 (2nd ed.). Indiana University Press. ISBN 978-0-253-21582-6.
