= The Ambush (1969 film) =

- Directed by: Živojin Pavlović
- Written by: Živojin Pavlović
- Produced by: Aleksandar Radulović
- Starring: Ivica Vidović; Milena Dravić; Severin Bijelić; Slobodan Aligrudić
- Cinematography: Dragoljub Ivkov
- Edited by: Olga Skrigin
- Production company: FRZ Beograd
- Release date: 1969
- Running time: 73 min
- Country: Yugoslavia
- Language: Serbo-Croatian

The Ambush (Serbo-Croatian: Zaseda, Serbian Cyrillic: Заседа) is a 1969 Yugoslav black-and-white feature film written and directed by Živojin Pavlović. It is considered to be one of the greatest achievements of the Yugoslav Black Wave. The screenplay is based on the motifs of Pavlović's short story Legends and Antonije Isaković's short story For the Third Time.

== Plot ==
The story takes place in 1945, near the end of the Second World War in Serbia, at a time when the newly formed communist government still had to deal with backward groups of Chetniks. The protagonist, Ive Vrana, is a young Dalmatian and member of SKOJ who believes in revolution and a higher goal. Ive's father was killed by Italian soldiers, causing him to move in with his relatives in Serbia to continue his high school education. He first encounters an obstacle when his girlfriend, Milica, is singled out as a bourgeoisie class traitor due to her upbringing. He also witnesses the drunk and reckless behaviour of partisan leader Zeka. Tensions increase as the local partisans fight and attempt to capture Marko, a Chetnik leader. Ive's idealism increasingly clashes with reality and the fact that his own side is also carrying out reckless and violent repression. He joins the ranks of OZNA, but finds himself even more disillusioned by an opportunistic officer's lies and the violence around him, as well as relationships, as Milica cheats on him with her PE teacher. Frustrated, Ive goes on a walk outside the village, but is captured by partisans who mistake him for a Chetnik and kill him when he is unable to provide documentation.

== Cast ==
- Ivica Vidović as Ive Vrana
- Milena Dravić as Milica
- Severin Bijelić as Zeka
- Slobodan Aligrudić as Jotić
- Pavle Vuisić as village elder
- Milivoje Tomić as class teacher
- Dragomir Felba as Topolovački
- Ljubomir Ćipranić as priest
- Branko Milićević as SKOJ leader
- Marija Milutinović as Slavka
- Mirjana Blašković as Milanka
- Mirjana Nikolić as teacher
- Alenka Rančić as friend with glasses
- Branko Obradović as col. Ozren
- Rastislav Jović as councilor in a white coat
- Milorad Majić as elder Božo
- Dušan Tadić as man with a blindfold
- Branislav Ciga Milenkovic as man talking about Jotić
- Gizela Vuković as Zora
- Ljiljana Jovanović as aunt
- Predrag Milinković as railwayman Tadija
- Miodrag Andrić as drunk soldier 1
- Milan Jelić as drunk soldier 2
- Vojislav Mićović as waiter in tavern
- Petar Lupa as village militiaman 1
- Marko Nikolić as village militiaman 2
- Damjan Klašnja as PE teacher
- Ljubo Škiljević as Chetnik
- Dušanka Duda Antonijević
- Slobodan Aleksić
- Branko Petković
- Siniša Glogovac

== Release ==
The Ambush was shown at the 16th Pula Film Festival, and later at the 30th Venice Film Festival, where it received the CIDALC award.

It is wrongly believed that the dark portrayal of the beginnings of communist rule provoked a reaction from the ruling Party and that, along with Želimir Žilnik's film Early Works, The Ambush prompted the publication of Vladimir Jovičić's article Black wave in our film in the newspaper Borba on August 3, 1969, just one day after The Ambush won two awards at the Pula Film Festival (a special diploma for directing and a critics' award). The article, however, was not an official statement of the League of Communists of Yugoslavia or any of its organs, nor does the article mention The Ambush (Jovičić focuses on two other films, It Rains in My Village and Do Not Mention the Cause of Death).

The Ambush was never officially banned, but it was not shown publicly again until 1989.

== Awards ==
- 30th Venice Film Festival - CIDALC award (Živojin Pavlović)
- 16th Pula Film Festival - Critics' award "Septima" and Special diploma for directing (Živojin Pavlović)

== Legacy ==
The Yugoslav Film Archive, in accordance with its authorities based on the Law on Cultural Heritage, declared one hundred Serbian feature films (1911–1999) as cultural heritage of great importance on December 28, 2016. The Ambush is also on that list.

== Restoration ==
In 2023, the Yugoslav Film Archive, in cooperation with Centar Film, digitally restored The Ambush. The film was shown at the European project "Season of Film Classics". The restored version premiered at the Archive on December 28, 2023.
