= Aligrudić =

Aligrudić (Serbian Cyrillic: Алигрудић) is a surname originally from Montenegro. Notable people with the surname include:

- Miloš Aligrudić (born 1964), Serbian politician and lawyer, son of Slobodan
- Slobodan Aligrudić (1934–1985), Serbian actor
