= Life of a Shock Force Worker =

- Slike iz života udarnika
- Directed by: Bahrudin Čengić
- Written by: Branko Vučićević; Bahrudin Čengić
- Produced by: Vera Mihić-Jolić
- Starring: Adem Čejvan; Stojan Aranđelović; Zaim Muzaferija; Mida Stevanović; Dragomir Bojanić Gidra
- Cinematography: Karpo Aćimović Godina
- Edited by: Olga Skrigin; Marija Fuks
- Music by: Bojan Adamič
- Production company: Studio film
- Release date: 1972
- Running time: 78 min
- Country: SFR Yugoslavia
- Languages: Serbo-Croatian; Slovene

Life of a Shock Force Worker (Serbo-Croatian: Slike iz života udarnika) is a 1972 Yugoslav feature film directed by Bahrudin Bata Čengić and based on a script by Branko Vučićević. It belongs to the Yugoslav Black Wave movement.

The film was inspired by the lives of coal miners who, due to their efforts in the first years of socialist Yugoslavia, were glorified and portrayed as national heroes. These workers were known as udarniks (shock force workers).

== Plot ==
Workers next to Adem's portrait

The film consists of a series of connected vignettes in the life of Adem, a Bosniak miner and his fellow udarniks, starting from his wedding. They are subsequently shown working in a mine, competing over who will mine more coal, and later continuing their numerous other competitions in their spare time. Adem receives honours and recognition for his hard work, but still leads a very modest life. He soon becomes an inspiration to other miners and the people around him. An artist paints Adem's portrait and has it placed right next to portraits of Tito and Stalin, which the workers carry around throughout the film. During his prolonged absence, he is suddenly left by his wife. When he and his comrades travel to Slovenia to receive an award, he begins a relationship with a Slovenian woman, also a shock force worker, and the two get married upon their return. A sculptor makes a bust of Adem. While Adem is working, a Chetnik threatens his wife. Upon learning about the presence of Chetniks nearby, a shootout erupts and Adem and his comrades emerge as victors. Now an official member of the League of Communists of Yugoslavia, Adem spends even less time at home, angering his second wife. He travels to Russia as a representative of the workers. When he comes back home he finds her massacred by Chetniks, and gets hospitalised after being found unconscious in the mine. He insists on going back to work and leaves the hospital, reasoning that "a man can bear anything". The film ends in 1972, with an older Adem pondering the state of Yugoslavia's workforce.

== Cast ==
- Adem Čejvan as Adem
- Stole Aranđelović as Stole
- Zaim Muzaferija as Zaim
- Mida Stevanović as Stepo
- Dragomir Bojanić Gidra as Neđo
- Ilija Bašić as Ilija
- Stefka Drolc as Stefka
- Alija Sirotanović
- Helena Buljan
- Petek Alojz
- Abdurahman Babajić
- Borislav Cvetković
- Paško Duplančić
- Vladimir Filipović
- Ranko Gučevac
- Ivica Hizar
- Petar Lupa
- Marko Martinović
- Risto Mijatović
- Smilja Milković
- Antun Mosina
- Andrej Nahtigal
- Džemal Ramović
- Edhem Škorić
- Slobodan Velimirović
- Faruk Zadić
- Želimira Zujović

== Background ==
The film takes place in the early days of socialist Yugoslavia, before the Tito-Stalin split, and pays homage to coal miner and shock force worker Alija Sirotanović, who is mentioned in the film. It tries to preserve the memory and legacy Yugoslav miners and the flaws of the system they worked in. The film begins in 1947 and follows the life and work of udarniks from the beginning of the udarnik movement until their retirement.

== Restoration ==
The film was restored in 2022 by the Association of European Film Archives and Cinematheques as part of the Season of Classic Films project. The project was a collaboration between the Slovenian and Croatian cinematheques, the Sarajevo Film Center, and the Austrian Film Museum. It was carried out under the supervisition of Karpo Aćimović Godina, the film's director of photography.

== Accolades ==
- Nominated for Best Restored Film at the 80th Venice Film Festival (2023)
