= Hor 29 novembar =

Choir is Vienna

hor 29 novembar (Serbo-Croatian pronunciation: [xɔ̂ːr ˈdʋǎːdɛseːt i ˈdɛ̂vɛti ˈnɔ̌ʋeːmbar], lit. 'choir '29th of November'') is a choir in Vienna. The choir describes itself as "an open collective where anyone can participate."

== History ==
The hor 29 novembar was founded in 2009 in Vienna by a dozen immigrants from the former Yugoslavia. The name of the choir—November 29—refers to the founding day of Yugoslavia by the Anti-Fascist Council for National Liberation (AVNOJ) in 1943 and the later Republic Day (national day) of Yugoslavia.

The choir was initially conceived in 2009 as a one-off interventionist art project to mark the 40th anniversary of the founding of the first Yugoslav workers' association in Vienna, "Mladi Radnik" ("Young Worker"). Due to the positive response of the first audience and further invitations to perform, the activities were maintained and the choir continues to exist today.

In 2016 the choir had about 25 members from different social and cultural backgrounds. Most of the members are still migrants from the former Yugoslavia, but members from Austria, Italy, France, Bulgaria, and Ukraine are also part of the choir. Jana Dolečki has been leading the choir since 2014.

Choir members said in interviews:

"We are not a choir, we are an anti-choir."

"It is important to us to be a bit subversive, and that's why we say—as a joke—that we are a punk choir. [...] We sing, we rehearse, and we are disciplined, but we are not a professional choir and we don't have classic rules and concepts like other choirs."

"The main motivation is to be part of a political group and to combine political activism with singing. ... You don't have to be able to sing to join the choir, because strictly speaking the choir is not a music project. Rather, it is a political-social group event and offers the opportunity to raise our voices at demonstrations and other public events."

The choir looks back on numerous performances on the streets of Vienna, in metro stations ("intervention safaris") at universities, in theaters, museums (Kunsthalle Wien at MuseumsQuartier, Museum of the History of Yugoslavia in Belgrade, District Museum Brigittenau) and at festivals (World Refugee Festival in Vienna 2010, Donaufestival in Krems 2010, Festival of Political Song 2011, Balkan Fever Festival 2012, Wienwoche 2014, Festival of Alternative Choirs 2015, Ute Bock Cup 2017, festival of activist choirs "Sve u jedan glas" in Zagreb, "Chorkrawall" in Leipzig, together with the Harri Stojka Trio, Jelena Popržan, Esther Bejarano, Kid Pex and EsRap, among others.

In 2015, the choir initiated the first Festival of Alternative Choirs (FAC) in Vienna, which included choirs from Austria, Germany, Slovenia, Croatia, and Serbia. In 2018, the third Festival of Alternative Choirs in Vienna was held, featuring choirs from Austria, Poland, Slovenia, and Serbia. The fifth FAC in Vienna in May 2023 included six choirs from Germany, France, and Austria.

In 2018, the choir provided the soundtrack for the film Das schönste Land der Welt ("The Most Beautiful Country in the World"; director: Želimir Žilnik).

== Repertoire ==
The hor 29 novembar considers itself an "activist choir" and rejects racially or geographically limited concepts of national heritage and culture. Its repertoire emphasizes the cultural and political activities of migrants who have lived in Austria since the 1960s.

The choir initially sang mainly partisans and worker songs from Yugoslavia glorifying the anti-fascist struggle and socialist construction (which situates the choir as a part of an international current). The repertoire has changed and grown since then, now including world-renowned anti-fascist and "anti-nationalist" songs such as "The Internationale" and "Bella ciao". Transcoded austropop and turbo-folk songs as well as original compositions are occasional part of their repertoire. The choir sings in a range of languages (including Albanian, Arabic, German, English, Greek, Italian, Yiddish, Catalan, Kurdish, Portuguese, Romai, Serbo-Croätian, Slovene, Spanish and Turkish).
