= Tirnanić =

Tirnanić is a Serbian surname. Notable people with the surname include:

- Aleksandar Tirnanić (1910–1992), Yugoslav footballer and manager
- Bogdan Tirnanić (1941–2009), Yugoslav journalist, essayist, and movie critic
