= Early Works (film) =

- Directed by: Želimir Žilnik
- Written by: Branko Vučićević; Želimir Žilnik
- Starring: Milja Vujanović; Bogdan Tirnanić; Čedomir Radović; Marko Nikolić
- Edited by: Karpo Aćimović Godina
- Production companies: Avala Film Beograd; Neoplanta film Novi Sad
- Release date: 1969
- Running time: 77 minutes
- Country: Yugoslavia
- Language: Serbo-Croatian

Early Works (Serbo-Croatian: Rani radovi, Serbian Cyrillic: Рани радови) is a 1969 Yugoslav film by Serbian author Želimir Žilnik. It critically depicts the aftermath of the 1968 student demonstrations in Yugoslavia. It won the Golden Bear at the 19th Berlin International Film Festival in 1969. The film belongs to the Yugoslav Black Wave movement.

== Plot ==
The film revolves around three young men and a girl named Jugoslava (Yugoslava), who represent the students that carried out the student demonstrations in Yugoslavia the previous year. They show disdain for the widespread petit-bourgeois routine of everyday life, and seek to change it. Led by Karl Marx's texts, they travel to remote villages and factories in hopes of inspiring a revolution among the locals, who show disinterest in their ideas. Forced to deal with their own limitations, they become disillusioned and bitter, even more so when they get arrested. Furious that their revolution had failed, the men decide to kill Jugoslava, as she is a witness to their failure. After shooting her, they cover her with the communist party's flag and burn her body. The message at the end of the film, a quote by Louis Antoine de Saint-Just, reads:

"Those who make revolutions by halves do nothing but dig their own tombs."

== Cast ==
- Milja Vujanović as Jugoslava
- Bogdan Tirnanić
- Čedomir Radović
- Marko Nikolić
- Slobodan Aligrudić
- Želimira Žujović

== Background ==
Žilnik found inspiration the previous year in the stormy worldwide student demonstrations that had their reflection in Yugoslavia at the time, as well as the Soviet invasion of Czechoslovakia and the suppression of the Prague Spring, which prompted him to seriously question the gap between the high ideals of the official Marxist ideology and its application in practice.

The title was borrowed from the popular anthology of the early work by Marx and Engels published first in Yugoslavia in 1953. These early texts had a significant influence on the development of the Yugoslav Praxis School of philosophy. The title was chosen ironically as a comment on the discrepancy between the theory, as expressed by Marx and Engels in their work, and practice, as implemented by the Soviet Union and other countries of real socialism.

Žilnik expressed his attitude by creating a strong contrast between the young, idealistic protagonists who fanatically adhere to Marxist principles and the far more banal and prosaic reality in the rural areas of Vojvodina at the time, i.e. through the presentation of the conflict between ideals and reality, which turns into a darkly humorous grotesque. It is believed that it was Early Works, as well as Živojin Pavlović's "Zaseda" (The Ambush), shown shortly afterwards in Pula, that prompted the publication of the article "Black Wave in Yugoslav Cinematography" in the party magazine Borba, which marked the beginning of the campaign against the Black Wave.

Žilnik originally planned to direct a sequel entitled Capital, which was supposed to be inspired by Marx's work of the same name, but instead became the subject of official condemnations, and was expelled from the Party and forced to live as an émigré in West Germany for a while.

== Censorship ==
The film was approved by censors for public screening on March 8, 1969, and was on trial under the charge of "harassing the Yugoslav public", which began on June 23, 1969. The film was originally banned in Yugoslavia and only approved for public screening in 1982. Despite this, a few months later it was screened at the Berlin Film Festival, where it triumphed and won the Golden Bear, thus achieving one of the highest honors in the history of Yugoslav cinema.

== Legacy ==
The Yugoslav Film Archive, in accordance with its authorities based on the Law on Cultural Heritage, declared one hundred Serbian feature films (1911-1999) as cultural heritage of great importance on December 28, 2016. Early Works is also on that list.
