= Kolt 15 Gap =

- Title card
- Directed by: Jovan Jovanović; Miodrag Milošević
- Written by: Jovan Jovanović; Miodrag Milošević
- Starring: Stanoje Ćebić (as himself)
- Cinematography: Petar Arandjelović; Bratislav Stojanović
- Edited by: Petar Arandjelović
- Production company: Dunav film
- Release date: 22 February 1971
- Running time: 24 minutes
- Country: Yugoslavia
- Language: Serbo-Croatian

Kolt 15 Gap is a 1971 Yugoslav short documentary film written and directed by Jovan Jovanović and Miodrag Milošević. It follows the life, views and whereabouts of an unemployed Marxist metalworker. The film belongs to the Yugoslav Black Wave.

The documentary won awards at festivals in Oberhausen, Utrecht and Belgrade, was included in the Anthology of Films of the Oberhausen Festival (published on the occasion of the 50th anniversary of the festival), and American film historian Erik Barnouw included it in his 1974 book Documentary – A History of the Non-Fiction Film.

== Content ==
The film follows the life and philosophy of Stanoje Ćebić, an unemployed Yugoslav metalworker and self-proclaimed Marxist fanatic, through narration and footage of him in various places mainly in and around Belgrade, which is dynamically spliced together with various other footage and photographs.

The film starts with his musings about being unable to attract women. It's followed by footage of him in front of Hotel Yugoslavia, which he states should be turned into a Marxist institute. He mostly expresses the sentiment that Yugoslavia has not yet reached the state of true socialism, reflecting on the exploitative nature of low-paying factory jobs, justifying his refusal to work in factories.

In the countryside, Ćebić, together with his father, recounts his early life during the 1941 invasion of Yugoslavia, when he joined the partisans at the age of 15 and then left the village in 1946 in hopes of learning a craft and earning a living, the latter of which he hasn't achieved, blaming it on the Yugoslav State's betrayal of socialist ideals, which he claims should be anti-capitalist. He calls himself a "a blind executive of Marxism, and that [it] is [his] pride and glory, as a Yugoslav metal worker".

Being unemployed, Ćebić hitchhikes and sleeps around train stations, mentioning that he rarely had a place to sleep even during his employment. He does what he refers to as "Kolt 15 Gap", an acronym of "Gathering scraps and licking plates for 15 years actively and passively" (Serbo-Croatian: Kupi otpatke, liže tanjire, 15 godina aktivno i pasivno). He talks about his various attempts to find jobs during his five-year unemployment, all of which failed in some way. He argues for abolishing the National Assembly and reducing Yugoslavia's republics to municipalities.

During the final third of the film, Ćebić walks around outside a factory and interviews other workers about their knowledge of Marx and Engels and their satisfaction with their jobs, pay and living conditions, before he and the camera operator are forced to leave. At the end, he laments on the paradox of skeptical employers sending him to psychiatrists for his beliefs of equality under Marxism, while psychiatrists keep on sending him back, stating that he is perfectly sane and capable of work that he, nonetheless, can't find.

== Style and themes ==
The style of the film has been described as anarchistic and dynamic, with fast cuts and most of the footage coming from a hand-held camera. It is at times more reminiscent of a pseudo-documentary and it is often comical in tone due to some of Ćebić's more absurd musings about life and politics.

In a 2010 interview, Jovanović has stated that the documentary is about "the state of the working class, which has reached the rock bottom of existence." The film takes a critical approach to socialism and its ideals in Yugoslav society.
