= Black Film (film) =

- Crni film
- Directed by: Želimir Žilnik
- Written by: Želimir Žilnik
- Cinematography: Karpo Aćimović Godina
- Edited by: Kaća Stefanović
- Music by: Dušan Ninkov
- Production company: Neoplanta film
- Release date: 22 February 1971
- Running time: 14 minutes
- Country: Yugoslavia
- Language: Serbo-Croatian

Black Film (Serbo-Croatian: Crni film, Црни филм) is a 1971 Yugoslav short documentary film directed by Želimir Žilnik. It belongs to the Yugoslav Black Wave.

== Content ==
The documentary explores difficulties experienced by the homeless populace in Yugoslavia. It starts in Novi Sad on January 29, 1971, when Žilnik finds 6 homeless men, whom he invites to his 48-square-meter apartment for a few days, where he lives with his wife and infant daughter. The men enter the Žilnik household, to his wife's dismay. While the men talk about their problems, Žilnik tries to find them accommodation. He talks to ordinary citizens, social workers and policemen, without any luck.

== Background ==
The documentary deals with the issues experienced by the homeless populace in Yugoslavia. Despite the state's socialist status, the homeless often received no welfare or social assistance. Žilnik criticises the willful ignorance of the state and its populace to the problems of homelessness and unemployment. It is also presented as a critique of the Yugoslav intelligentsia and filmmakers who make no effort to commit to social change.
