= Čejvan =

Čejvan is a surname. Notable people with the surname include:

- Adem Čejvan (1927–1989), Bosnian actor
- Jan Čejvan (born 1976), Slovenian figure skater
