= Christopher Roth =

German film director, producer and artist

Christopher Roth (born 26 June 1964 in Munich) is a German film director, artist and TV producer.

== Biography ==
From 1985 to 1992 Roth studied at the University of Television and Film Munich. In 2000 he moved to Berlin. Since 2017 he has been teaching Storytelling in Architecture at the ETH Zurich Faculty of Architecture. The Sunday issue of the Frankfurter Allgemeine Zeitung listed him 14th on its list of Kulturpersonen des Jahres (English: Cultural Persons of the Year). Roth is in a relationship with the actress Jeanne Tremsal.

== Film ==
Roth is working as a film director, screenwriter and film producer. From 1998 to 2010, he filmed commercials for various agencies and worked with former footballers (Sepp Maier, Franz Beckenbauer) and people from the entertainment industry (Thomas Anders, Dieter Bohlen, Dolly Buster, Thomas Gottschalk, Harald Schmidt).

He debuted as a feature film director in 1995 with Looosers!, a film about two averagely talented advertising copywriters portrayed by Bernd Michael Lade and Oliver Korittke who fall in love with Ulrika, played by Liane Forestieri. In 2002, he was awarded the Silver Bear Jury Prize in the category Neue Perspektiven der Filmkunst (English: New Perspectives in Film Art) at the 52nd Berlin International Film Festival for Baader, a narrative about Andreas Baader and the Red Army Fraction (RAF). He was also in competition for the Golden Bear with the film. In 2016, the film The Seasons in Quincy: Four Portraits of John Berger made in collaboration with Tilda Swinton, premiered at the 66th Berlin International Film Festival. Alongside Colin MacCabe, Bartek Dziadosz and Tilda Swinton, Roth was co-creator of the documentary. Roth is an actor in the 2017 film Axolotl Overkill by Helene Hegemann. In June 2022 Servus Papa, See You in Hell, a film about growing up in a commune in the 1980s, premiered at Filmfest München (English: Munich International Film Festival) and was nominated in the categories of director, screenplay and acting.

== TV ==
Roth also uses TV as a medium and distribution platform to highlight issues and disseminate them in an intelligible format. In 2018 he founded the television platform space-time.tv which hosts four different channels (REALTY-V, station.plus, 42 and 2038) and publishes new content on an ongoing basis. Content from different areas such as society, art, politics and science is presented. The logos were created by the designers and artists Diann Bauer, Angela Bulloch and Manuel Bürger.

The channel REALTY-V was created as part of the long-term project REALTY by Tirdad Zolghadr and deals with topics such as gentrification, urbanism, the future in global and local contexts. The content explores the role of contemporary art in the recent history of urban renewal. In May 2022, the book REALTY. Beyond the Traditional Blueprints of Art & Gentrification was published with a contribution from REALTY-V and presented at KW Institute for Contemporary Art. station.plus mainly shows content created by students at the chair of Arno Brandlhuber at the ETH Zurich Faculty of Architecture. The station was founded in 2017 together with Arno Brandlhuber and Olaf Grawert.

Normally, architects and architecture students design and realize concepts and buildings. But can architects do a TV-show? That's new – and "Station.plus" dares this experiment.

— Svenja Binz, New platform, new view on architecture, Topos Magazine, 26 Nov 2018

Channel 42 is located on the premises of the haubrok foundation at Fahrbereitschaft in Berlin-Lichtenberg. The channel uses television as a broadcast instrument for artistic and utopian ideas and shows television productions by artists created since the 1970s. 2038 is a channel that evolved during the project for the 17th Venice Biennale of Architecture in 2021 and shows artists, ecologists, economists, scientists, politicians, writers curated in 2019 for the project 2038 – The New Serenity. Using so-called TV-hacks, more than 20 websites were hacked for a period of three weeks in 2020 featuring the program of space-time.tv. Among them were the sites of CAF x Copenhagen Architecture Festival, e-flux architecture and ARCH+.

== Author ==
Roth is engaged as an author and editor. In his 1982 novel 200D, Roth uses a protagonist to tell the story of a weekend in Munich, weaving real-life characters into a fictional story. German critics cited the narrative as a forerunner of German Popliteratur (English: pop literature) some time after its publication. In 2012, the novel was reissued after thirty years, with a foreword by Moritz von Uslar. In his text Willkommen im Dataland (English: Welcome to Dataland), Roth writes in 1996 of the internet as a network that will reorganize the exchange of and access to information and give rise to new forms of interaction. Information will be hyperlinked and artificial intelligence in the form of smart agents and knowbots will know about the preferences of their users.

You never really know where you are on the Internet^{6}. You move from one node to another. The network is not centrally organized. It is a system without a center. You have addresses, but you can't even tell where the server^{6} is. What for? A virtual GPS would always be able to tell you on the Internet where you are in reference to the world, to the other surfers^{5}, data dandies^{5}, knowbots^{1} or even malicious agents and viruses^{2}. (excerpt from Willkommen im Dataland)

In a 2004 collection of texts on Finnish director Aki Kaurismäki, he describes Kaurismäki's films and approach through a personal encounter in a London pub and places he uses to cross-reference his films and past and present political events.

== Collaborations ==
Roth realizes the majority of its projects in collaborations. Together with Georg Diez, the research project 80*81, funded by the Kulturstiftung des Bundes (English: German Federal Cultural Foundation), was created in 2010. In May 2010, a live performance took place at The Watermill Center in New York and the first four books were presented. In the course of the project, ten books were produced and published. In 2011, the eight-hour opera The 80*81 Findings, 2081 was performed at the Munich Opera Festival at the Bavarian State Opera in Munich. A year later, a series of congresses was organized in Berlin, Johannesburg, New Delhi, Sao Paulo, and Tel Aviv, documented in the book 2081. What Happened?. In 2016, Merve Verlag published the one-volume compilation What Happened? 80*81.

In June 2013, his theater production Mahagonny ist überall und Chefsessel schon ab 59 Neuro (English: Mahagonny is everywhere and you can get an executive chair already at 59 Neuro) was the central project of the Mahagonny Festival in Bremen. In his speculative world exhibition parcours, Roth designed scenes that took place on several floors and revolved around the value of things. He collaborated with architects, lawyers, journalists, scientists, politicians, economists, students, musicians and philosophers. Among others, Armen Avanessian, Bengt Beutler, Florian Hecker, Julia Hummer, Antonia Kesel, Katja Riemann, Michael Stöppler, Moritz von Uslar and the Bremer Philharmoniker (English: Bremen Philharmonic Orchestra) were part of the production.

Since 2017, he has been working and architecting with Arno Brandlhuber and Olaf Grawert on films that show the connections between architecture and politics and their impact of decisions on a local and global level. The films feature interviews with Sandra Bartoli, Oana Bogdan, Renée Gailhoustet, Yona Friedman, Patrik Schumacher, Hans-Jochen Vogel and, Anna Yeboah, among others. The film Legislating Architecture (2016) highlights that architecture is not just understood as a built environment, but also as a social domain. The film was first shown at the 15th Venice Biennale of Architecture in 2016. The Property Drama (2017) premiered at the 2017 Chicago Architecture Biennial and explores who influences property rights. Architecting after Politics (2018) explores the relationship between public power and private sector interests. The film is shown as part of a traveling exhibition and supplemented with sequences and content that relate to the locality. The films are screened continuously and have been included in the program of various international architecture film festivals.

== Venice Biennale of Architecture ==
In 2021 Roth was one of the four curators of the German Pavilion at the 17th Venice Biennale of Architecture. Together with Arno Brandlhuber, Olaf Grawert and Nikolaus Hirsch, they assembled the Team 2038 from various experts and contributors and realized the project 2038 – The New Serenity. The so-called History Channels show what happened from 2020 to 2038 to arrive at the New Serenity. An article by Roth was featured in the publication 2038. The New Serenity in 2021.

== Art ==
Roth exhibits as an artist at the gallery of Esther Schipper and had exhibitions in Germany, the United States, and Italy, among other countries. Roth collaborates in various constellations with authors, architects, artists, designers and others. In 1991 he was represented with RothStauffenberg at the São Paulo Art Biennial. In 2008 their book Based On A True Story was published. He uses truth and fiction as narrative elements in the solo exhibition Roth. In the exhibition, a horror film, a video documentary, and sculptures are arranged alongside personal traces and objects. As a part of the exhibition DEVOUR! Social Cannibalism, political redefinition and architecture in March 2015, a film contribution was made together with Arno Brandlhuber. He collaborated with Vera Lehndorff for the art film Blow Out. The film was shot in the dilapidated modernist concrete dome La Cupola of director Michelangelo Antonioni on Sardinia. Roth uses different perspectives for the narration whereby it is not clear who is narrating. The film was part of his solo exhibition Christopher Roth, Blow Out Featuring Ver(uschk)a and is a tribute to the architect Dante Bini and the future.

I thought that our present time, which was the future back in the 1960s, would be a lot wilder.

— Christopher Roth, Artnet News, 19 Feb 2016

During the 9th Berlin Biennale in 2016, the 30-minute film DISCREET - An Intelligence Agency for the People was created in collaboration with Armen Avanessian and Alexander Martos. They collaborated with experts in art, theory, technology, politics, law, hacktivism, and finance to address the challenges of post-state sovereignty, global financial feudalism, and new algorithmic regimes. Together with Armen Avanessian, Roth also produced the film Hyperstition in 2016, in which they put together different voices from philosophy and their research on the subjects of time and narrative. The film uses elements of science fiction and is set in the past, present and future and has been shown at art festivals in Europe and America. Armen Avanessian, Elie Ayache, Ray Brassier, Iain Hamilton Grant, Helen Hester, Deneb Kozikoski, Robin Mackay, Steven Shaviro, Nick Srnicek, Christopher K. Thomas, Pete Wolfendale and Suhail Malik are featured in the film. Next to the appearances of J.G. Ballard, Nick Land, Philipp Lahm, Quentin Meillassoux, Reza Negarestani, Patricia Reed, Tom Streidl, James Trafford, Jeanne Tremsal, Alex Williams, and Slavoj Žižek.

== Reviews ==
„The second piece, Spring, directed by Roth, is undoubtedly the most unorthodox and experimental-ish. Unhappily, Roth had to take this approach after the death of Berger's wife Beverly, which meant that the original subject, understandably, absented himself from proceedings. Roth's solution is to focus on what Berger appeared to love about Quincy – the animals, the landscape, the work in the fields – and creates an enjoyable concoction, sometimes funny, sometimes surreal." —Andrew Pulver in The Guardian, 16 February 2016

"Roth's minimal yet rich exhibition weaves a dense web, starting with its title: 'Blow Out' immediately brings to mind the 1966 film Blow Up by director Michelangelo Antonioni. But it also refers to the construction technique used to build Binishells—a round concrete structure shaped by blowing out a huge air balloon—invented by architect Dante Bini. —Hili Perlson on Artnet News, 19 February 2016

== Awards and nominations ==
- 1993: Screenwriting Award North Rhine-Westphalia for Time Job (co-author with Martin Rauhaus)
- 2002: Silver Bear Jury Prize of 52nd Berlin International Film Festival for Baader
- 2022: German Cinema New Talent Award 2022 of Filmfest München for Servus Papa, See You in Hell (English: So Long Daddy, See You in Hell), (nomination for Directing: Christopher Roth)
- 2022: German Cinema New Talent Award 2022 of Filmfest München for Servus Papa, See You in Hell (English: So Long Daddy, See You in Hell), (nomination for Script: Jeanne Tremsal, Christopher Roth)

== Filmography (selection) ==
- 1995: Looosers!
- 1996: Hawaii '96
- 1998: Candy
- 1998 until 2010: more than 100 commercials
- 2002: Baader
- 2007: Lacoma (unfinished)
- 2007: until 2013: Mozartbique
- 2014: Anti-Villa (9'30 Min.)
- 2015: Hawaii '962036m (7 Min.)
- 2015: AnnA (14'20 Min.)
- 2015: anna+3 (18'40 Min.)
- 2016: Hyperstition
- 2016: Blow Out (10 Min.)
- 2016: The Seasons in Quincy: Four Portraits of John Berger
- 2016: Legislating Architecture (30'24 Min.)
- 2017: Axolotl Overkill (actor)
- 2017: The Schengen Tapes
- 2017: The Property Drama (32 Min.)
- 2018: Architecting after Politics
- 2019: Europe Endless (23'20 Min.)
- 2019: Keywords for Today (23'15 Min.)
- 2019: New Deutschland (20 Min.)
- 2021: 2038 – The New Serenity (four hours of material)
- 2022: 2038, Here Is How!
- 2022: So Long Daddy, See You In Hell

== Exhibitions ==
=== Solo exhibitions ===
- 2012: Roth, Galerie Esther Schipper, Berlin
- 2016: Blow Out featuring Ver(uschk)a, Galerie Esther Schipper, Berlin
- 2016: Legislating Architecture Schweiz, Arno Brandlhuber & Christopher Roth, Institute for the History and Theory of Architecture (GTA)
- 2018: Legislating Architecture | Architecting after Politics (*****S), vai Vorarlberger Architektur Institut, Dornbirn
- 2019: legislating architecture: architecting after politics, aut. architektur und tirol, Innsbruck
- 2019: Watch more TV!, Galerie Esther Schipper, Berlin

=== Group exhibitions ===
- 2013: Das Christoph-Projekt, kunstraum pro arte, Salzburg
- 2015: Sommer Kino, Johnen Galerie, Berlin
- 2015: DEVOUR! Social Cannibalism, political redefinition and architecture, part II, ZK/U Berlin - Center for Art and Urbanistics, Berlin
- 2015: DEVOUR! Social Cannibalism, political redefinition and architecture, part III, Kunstkraftwerk Leipzig
- 2016: Between Frames, FAHRBEREITSCHAFT, Berlin
- 2016: DISCREET – An Intelligence Agency for the People, 9th Berlin Biennale, curated by DIS (collective), Berlin
- 2016: Grün stört. Im Fokus einer Farbe, MARTa Herford, Herford
- 2017: The Property Drama, Chicago Architecture Biennial: Make New History, Chicago Cultural Center
- 2017: mise-en-scène – architectural portraits, Deutsches Architektur Zentrum DAZ (German Architecture Center), Berlin
- 2018: An Atlas of Commoning: Orte des Gemeinschaffens, curated by ARCH+, CMU, ifa, Kunstraum Kreuzberg/Bethanien, Berlin
- 2020: Mein Vater, meine Nachbarn, meine Freunde und deren Freunde, FAHRBEREITSCHAFT, Berlin
- 2020: PS81E, Galerie Esther Schipper, Berlin

== Works ==
=== Collaborations ===
- 2000 until 2009: RothStauffenberg, collaboration with Franz Stauffenberg, exhibitions in Basel, Berlin, New York, Paris, São Paulo, Venice, Zurich
- 2010 until 2011: 80*81, research project for more than one year in collaboration with Georg Diez, more than 20 theater performances
- 2010 until 2011: Minus Odysseus, Prinzregententheater, Munich
- 2011: The 80*81 Findings, 2081, in collaboration with Georg Diez, 8-hour opera, Bavarian State Opera, Munich
- 2011: READ, 2-day readings, performances, theater, Bad Driburg
- 2012: What Happened 2081?, congress, in collaboration with Georg Diez, Center for Historical Reenactment, walk to Miniland, Johannesburg
- 2013: What Happened 2081?, congress, in collaboration with Georg Diez, walk from the Hall of Nations to the Lotus Temple, New Delhi
- 2013: What Happened 2081?, congress, in collaboration with Georg Diez, Kunst-Werke, walk from Berlin-Mitte to the Olympiastadium Berlin
- 2013: Mahagonny ist überall und Chefsessel ab 59 Neuro, Mahagonny Festival, Theater Bremen, Bremen

=== Author, Publisher ===
- 200D. Novel. belleville Verlag, Munich 1982, ISBN 978-3-923646-00-5
- Based on a True Story. RothStauffenberg, Edition Patrick Frey, Zurich 2008, ISBN 978-3-905509-74-8
- 200D. Novel. Bloomsbury Publishing, Berlin 2012, ISBN 978-3-8333-0791-1
- REALTY-V, Christopher Roth in: REALTY. Beyond the Traditional Blueprints of Art & Gentrification. Tirdad Zolghadr (Ed.), Hatje Canz Verlag, Berlin 2022, ISBN 978-3-7757-5171-1
- I Love my Time <3 2038 <3, Christopher Roth, in: 2038. The New Serenity. Team 2038 (Ed.), Sorry Press, Munich 2021, p. 24–45, ISBN 978-3-9820440-4-0

=== 80*81 (publications) ===
- What Happened? (Vol. 1). Georg Diez / Christopher Roth, Edition Patrick Frey, Zurich 2010, ISBN 978-3-905929-01-0
- California über alles (Vol. 2). Georg Diez / Christopher Roth, Edition Patrick Frey, Zurich 2010, ISBN 978-3-905929-02-7
- MAO III (Vol. 3). Georg Diez / Christopher Roth, Edition Patrick Frey, Zurich 2010, ISBN 978-3-905929-03-4
- u²4u+8=0 (Vol. 4). Georg Diez / Christopher Roth, Edition Patrick Frey, Zurich 2010, ISBN 978-3-905929-04-1
- Travelogue / Atrocity & Grace (Vol. 5/6). Georg Diez / Christopher Roth, Edition Patrick Frey, Zurich 2010, ISBN 978-3-905929-05-8
- I Love My Time (Vol. 7). Georg Diez / Christopher Roth, Edition Patrick Frey, Zurich 2010, ISBN 978-3-905929-06-5
- Superburg (Vol. 8). Georg Diez / Christopher Roth, Edition Patrick Frey, Zurich 2010, ISBN 978-3-905929-08-9
- far from home (Vol. 9). Georg Diez / Christopher Roth, Edition Patrick Frey, Zurich 2010, ISBN 978-3-905929-09-6
- When We Were Good (Vol. 10). Georg Diez / Christopher Roth, Edition Patrick Frey, Zurich 2010, ISBN 978-3-905929-10-2
- The Eleventh Circle (Vol. 11). Georg Diez / Christopher Roth, Edition Patrick Frey, Zurich 2010, ISBN 978-3-905929-11-9
- 2081. Georg Diez / Christopher Roth, Edition Patrick Frey, Zurich 2012, ISBN 978-3-905929-28-7
- What Happened? 80*81. Georg Diez, Christopher Roth, Merve Verlag, Leipzig 2016, ISBN 978-3-88396-378-5

== Work RothStauffenberg ==
=== Solo exhibitions ===
- 2000: Schuß-Gegenschuß, Schipper&Krome, Berlin
- 2002: Deal, Schipper&Krome, Berlin
- 2004: (Schall und Rauch), Schipper&Krome, Berlin
- 2005: Drips Of Water Fall Onto China, W139, Amsterdam
- 2007: Off the Wall: RothStauffenberg, Indianapolis Museum of Art, Indianapolis
- 2007: Monster, Esther Schipper, Berlin
- 2008: It's not about YOU, it's about THEM, The House at Nyehaus, New York
- 2008: Maskenball, Michelle Nicol Fine Arts, Zurich
- 2009: Cartes Postales, Esther Schipper, Berlin

=== Group exhibitions ===
- 2001: Neue Welt, Frankfurter Kunstverein, Frankfurt am Main
- 2002: Art&Economy, Deichtorhallen, Hamburg
- 2003: M_ARS, Kunst und Krieg, Neue Galerie Graz am Landesmuseum Joanneum, Graz
- 2004: 3', Schirn Kunsthalle, Frankfurt am Main
- 2004: Emotions Eins, Frankfurter Kunstverein, Frankfurt am Main
- 2006: Modus, Neue Kunst Halle St. Gallen, St. Gallen
- 2006: Anonymous, Schirn Kunsthalle, Frankfurt am Main
- 2007: Housetrip, Art Forum Berlin Special exhibition
- 2007: Made in Germany, Sprengel Museum, Hannover
- 2008: Art Unlimited, Art Basel, Basel
- 2008: all inclusive, Schirn Kunsthalle, Frankfurt am Main
