= The Way Steel Was Tempered =

1988 film

Tako se kalio čelik
- Directed by: Želimir Žilnik
- Written by: Branko Andrić; Želimir Žilnik
- Produced by: Svetozar Udovički
- Starring: Lazar Ristovski; Tatjana Pujin; Relja Bašić; Ljiljana Blagojević
- Cinematography: Nina Vranešević
- Edited by: Slobodan Jandric
- Music by: Karolj Morvai; Vladimir Stanojević
- Distributed by: Terra Film; RTV Novi Sad; Avala Film; Zvezda Film
- Release date: 30 June 1988
- Running time: 101 minutes
- Country: Yugoslavia
- Language: Serbo-Croatian

The Way Steel Was Tempered (Serbo-Croatian: Tako se kalio čelik) is a 1988 Yugoslav film directed by Serbian director Želimir Žilnik. It was nominated for a Golden St. George award at the 16th Moscow International Film Festival and has been screened at festivals worldwide such as the Toronto International Film Festival. It was also shown at the Pyongyang Film Festival.

== Plot ==
A steel worker, Leo, tries to live a carefree life, but his progress towards that goal is impeded by the steel mill management that does its best to earn a profit before the steel bubble bursts and the company goes under. Leo and his comrades are faced with a bleak and uncertain future. As this trouble with his employment goes on, he meets a woman named Verica and becomes involved in an extramarital affair with her.

His wife, Ruža, fed up with her husband's constant cheating and dishonesty divorces him and goes back to live with her parents, leaving Leo behind. As she takes her leave, she meets Michel, the head of security at Leo's steel mill. Michel is a photographer and an ex-soldier. After seeing them together, Leo is faced with emotional turmoil and manages to lose his job after a jealous outburst. In a fit of anger Leo attempts to knock down a monument in the town square, and is sent to prison.

Oddly enough, after being sent to prison Leo ends up working back at the steel mill, as the factory and the prison have a deal in using prisoners as general laborers. Foreign business partners arrive and they are very impressed with the historic appearance of the mill and the workers that they decide that the whole place be put under historic preservation. The foreign partners, being passionate collectors of socialist realism take a liking to Leo and take him with them as a "perfect specimen." Several years later he returns - triumphantly - driving a new Cadillac car.

== Cast ==
- Lazar Ristovski as Leo
- Tatjana Pujin as Lili
- Relja Bašić as Michel
- Ljiljana Blagojević as Ruža
