= 2038 – The New Serenity =

2038 – The New Serenity (German: 2038 – Die Neue Gelassenheit) is the German contribution in 2021 to the 17th Venice Biennale of Architecture, the world's most important and influential architecture exhibition, in Venice. The project is a fictional retrospective and looks back from the year 2038 to the year 2021 and deals with the question: How will we live together? The concept of the four curators Arno Brandlhuber, Olaf Grawert, Nikolaus Hirsch and Christopher Roth prevailed in a public two-stage open competition in 2019. Because of the optimistic approach, the jury has chosen the cinematic contribution and was the responsibility of the Federal Ministry of the Interior and Community (German: Bundesministerium des Innern und für Heimat). The 17th Venice Biennale of Architecture has been postponed from 2020 to 2021 due to the COVID-19 pandemic.

== Curatorial Concept ==
2038 – The New Serenity was realized by the interdisciplinary team 2038, in collaboration of different disciplines such as architecture, art, economics, ecology, philosophy, politics science and technology, humanities, social and political science. The year 2038 is a fiction made credible by the factual knowledge of these experts. Methodologically, the project can be classified in the field of Speculative realism. The team choose to use film to feature real experts who fictionally look back from the year 2038 and explain how the world overcame a "profound crisis" in the 2020s and became a better place afterwards.

== Films ==
The films of 2038 – The New Serenity tell the story of a world that has arrived in the era of the New Serenity and use both factual and fictional elements for the narrative. Over four hours of footage were produced for the project.

=== Interrail 2038 ===
The film Interrail 2038 is an introduction to the theme. It shows two 18-year-old teenagers from the future who live in the time of the New Serenity and explore the Venice of their childhood. The protagonists Billie and Vincent have beamed back to a deserted Venice of the year 2021 and talk about this strange past on their way to the German pavilion. The film was directed by Christopher Roth and written by Leif Randt.

=== History Channels ===
Experts from various disciplines continue the narrative through a series of sections known as the History Channels. These sections examine developments during the 2020s and 2030s through case studies and expert contributions. The project addresses changes in areas including peace, governance, and the management of complexity .

The History Channels comprise four sections: Architecting Data-Spaces, Architecting Property, Architecting (Eco)Systems and Architecting Complexity. They address subjects including digitization, the platform economy, exploitation of planetary resources, structural inequalities associated with capitalism, and emerging forms of coexistence.

The intention is to give to the hypothetical all the persuasive power of the factual by narrating the future, because, according to Ludwig Engel and Olaf Grawert, members of the team of curators along with Arno Brandlhuber and Nikolaus Hirsch, in their text ‚Zukunft ist gegenwärtig‘ (The future is here): ‚A story about the future is always a story for the future. Because it adds another perspective to what we can conceive of today, and therefore changes the possibilities of what the future could be‘.

— Christiane Bürklein, Floornature, 14 May 2021

== Exhibition ==
The COVID-19 pandemic as a real crisis caught up with the fiction of 2038. The exhibition was postponed from 2020 to 2021 while the concept was adapted to have a virtual pavilion in addition to the physical one. The exhibition space in the German pavilion remained empty except for QR codes on the walls. Visitors could also meet and talk with each other in the virtual pavilion.

While the curators initially planned to address three global crises, the financial markets, migration and climate, as the starting point for the exhibition 2038, a fourth one had to be added: the virus. This further changed things, making it difficult if not impossible to plan even for the present. An ’uncertainty even about the near future, making recent speculation irrelevant and bringing back the futures of the past.

— Christiane Bürklein, Floornature, 14 May 2021

One of the ways to gain access to the so-called Cloud Pavilion is through the Google Arts & Culture web application. In the 3D pavilion, the different formats of 2038 are made accessible.

== Publications ==
The contribution was accompanied by two issues of the multi-lingual street newspaper Arts of the Working Class In July 2020 the first issue (#120) and in August 2021 the second issue (#17) was published in cooperation with the Berlin Questions conference. The issues include contributions by Andrés Arauz, Diann Bauer, Lara Verena Bellenghi, Benjamin Bratton, Anne Katrin Bohle, Elizabeth Diller, Christian Drosten, Guerilla Architects, Francis Kéré, Lukas Kubina, Lesley Lokko, Sam Lubicz, Dorte Mandrup, Renzo Martens, Caroline Nevejan, Sabine Oberhuber and Thomas Rau, Joanna Pope, Christian Posthofen, Anna Yeboah, among others.

=== Sorry Press ===
In 2021, Sorry Press published an anthology titled 2038 The New Serenity. Featuring fictional essays and stories by 2038 protagonists such as Tatiana Bilbao, Ludwig Engel and Olaf Grawert, Mitchell Joachim, Evgeny Morozov, Hilary Mason, Leif Randt, Christopher Roth, Mark Wigley and others.

== Further program ==
Further collaborations were with the Archiv der Zukunft Lichtenfels (English: Archive of the Future Lichtenfels) in the town Lichtenfels and the Goethe-Institut. In the Performing Architecture program series of the Goethe-Institut, 100 Ways to Say We: Konferenz der Abwesenden (English: 100 Ways to Say We: Conference of the Absent) was realized with Rimini Protokoll and 100 Ways to Say We: Training for the Future with Jonas Staal and Florian Malzacher. The films of the History Channel are shown on Christopher Roth's online TV channel space-time.tv.

== Reception ==
In July 2021, the German Finance Minister Olaf Scholz visited the exhibition in Venice. he exhibition was perceived very positively and partly critically.

== Quotes ==
We must criticize, but we must also propose solutions. Architects have a special responsibility here, because their design has far-reaching consequences. 2038 takes an optimistic look at the future, because it is in our own hands.

— Olaf Grawert, BauNetz, 25 May 2021

== Scope of work and formats ==
- 2020: The New Serenity / La Nuova Serenità, Arts of the Working Class, Issue 120, (publication, street journal)
- 2021: Interrail 2038, on the video platform YouTube (film)
- 2021: History Channels, selection on vimeo (more than 60 short films)
- 2021: 2038, The Cloud Pavilion (Mozilla Hubs)
- 2021: 2038, German pavilion (at the Giardini in Venice)
- 2021: The New Serenity, Arts of the Working Class, Issue 17, (publication, street journal)
- 2021: 2038 – German Pavilion at the 17th International Architecture Exhibition — La Biennale di Venezia, Google Arts & Culture, (virtual presentation of the project)
- 2021: 2038. The New Serenity, Team 2038 (Ed.), Sorry Press, Munich, 2021, ISBN 978-3-9820440-4-0, (book)
- 2021: TV Hacks, on different websites (references to project)
- 2021: Zukunft ist jetzt (The future is now), Archiv der Zukunft Lichtenfels, (workshop)
- 2021: 100 Ways to Say We: Training for the Future, Jonas Staal and Florian Malzacher, Goethe-Institut / Performing Architecture (offline marathon)
- 2021: 100 Ways to Say We: Konferenz der Abwesenden (100 Ways to Say We: Conference of the Absent), Rimini Protokoll, Goethe-Institut / Performing Architecture (theater)
- 2022: 2038, Here Is How!, Goethe-Institut: screenings worldwide (film)
