= The Unemployed =

- Directed by: Želimir Žilnik
- Written by: Želimir Žilnik
- Cinematography: Petar Latinović
- Edited by: Milica Poličević
- Music by: Dušan Ninkov
- Production company: Neoplanta Film
- Release date: 27 February 1968
- Running time: 10 minutes
- Country: Yugoslavia
- Language: Serbo-Croatian

The Unemployed (Serbo-Croatian: Nezaposleni ljudi) is a 1968 Yugoslav short documentary film directed by Želimir Žilnik. The film focuses on the issue of unemployment in socialist Yugoslavia. It belongs to the Yugoslav Black Wave.

== Content ==
The film deals with the social position and issues faced by the unemployed populace in Yugoslavia. It shows the life of several unemployed men temporarily living in a collective accommodation provided by the employment office. The director interviews them on the street and inside their accommodation; they discuss societal inequality, the red bourgeoisie, differences in salaries and the housing situation among the homeless. The short ends with an unemployed man hitting himself in the head with a stone while another recites Aleksa Šantić's poem Stay here (Ostajte ovdje).
