= María Baxa =

Serbian-Italian actress (1946–2019)

- Марија Бакса
- Born: María Teresa Baxa; 15 April 1946; Osijek, PR Croatia, FPR Yugoslavia (now Croatia)
- Died: 14 November 2019 (aged 73); Belgrade, Serbia
- Occupation: Actress

María Baxa (born Marija Baksa, Serbian Cyrillic: Марија Бакса; 15 April 1946 – 14 November 2019) was a Serbian-Italian film actress, mainly active in Italian cinema.

Born in Osijek, Baxa made her film debut in Branko Čelović's Bokseri idu u raj, then moved to Italy where she became a popular starlet in Italian genre cinema, especially in commedia sexy all'italiana (sex comedies). In the late 1980s, Baxa left showbusiness to be an architect.

== Filmography ==
Year	Title	Role	Notes
1967	Bokseri idu u raj	Eva	
1971	The Beasts	The wife	(segment "Una bella famiglia")
1971	Young and Healthy as a Rose		
1972	The Valachi Papers	Donna	
1972	Boccaccio	Tebalda	
1972	Il terrore con gli occhi storti	Margaretha	
1972	Black Turin	Nascarella	
1972	The Mighty Anselmo and His Squire	Fiammetta	
1973	Un amore così fragile, così violento	Sigora milanese	
1976	Sex with a Smile II	Maria, The Detective's Wife	(Segment "Il Detective"), Uncredited
1977	Per amore di Poppea	Poppea	
1978	Candido Erotico	Veronique	
1978	Incontri molto... ravvicinati del quarto tipo	Emmanuelle	
1978	Deadly Chase	Cora Venier Verelli	
1978	Gegè Bellavita	Signora Sciscioni	Uncredited
1979	Belli e brutti ridono tutti	Director's Wife	
1979	Gardenia	Gardenia Girl	
1982	Cyclops	Vivijana	
1984	Strangler vs. Strangler	Natalija Kopicl	
1988	Russicum - I giorni del diavolo		
