= District Museum Brigittenau =

Museum in Vienna, Austria

Coordinates: 48.2343°N 16.3829°E

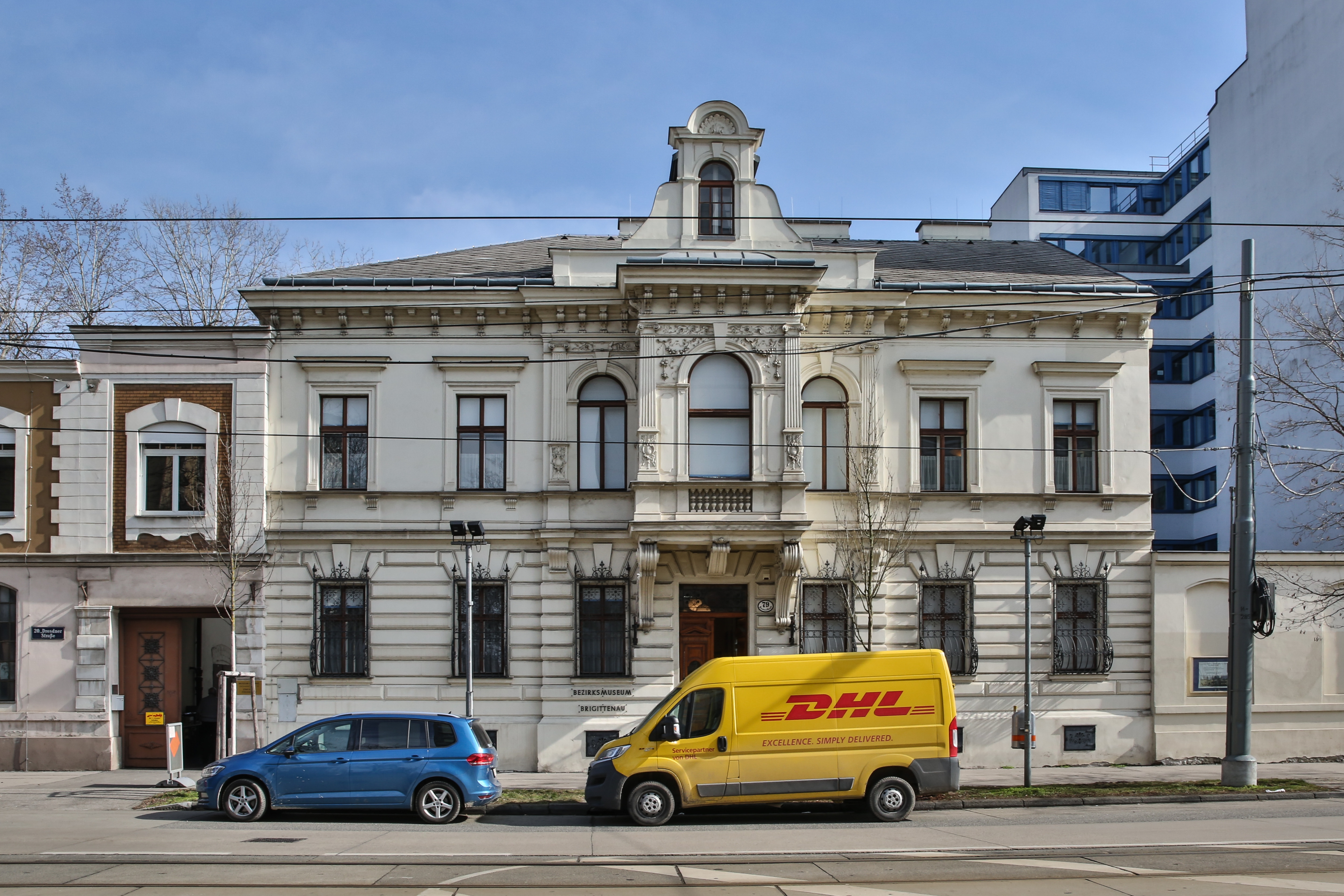
District Museum Brigittenau in the Bertram Schlössl

District Museum Brigittenau (translated as Bezirksmuseum Brigittenau) is a local museum in Brigittenau a district of Vienna, Austria / EU. It is located at the address Dresdner Straße 79.

== History ==
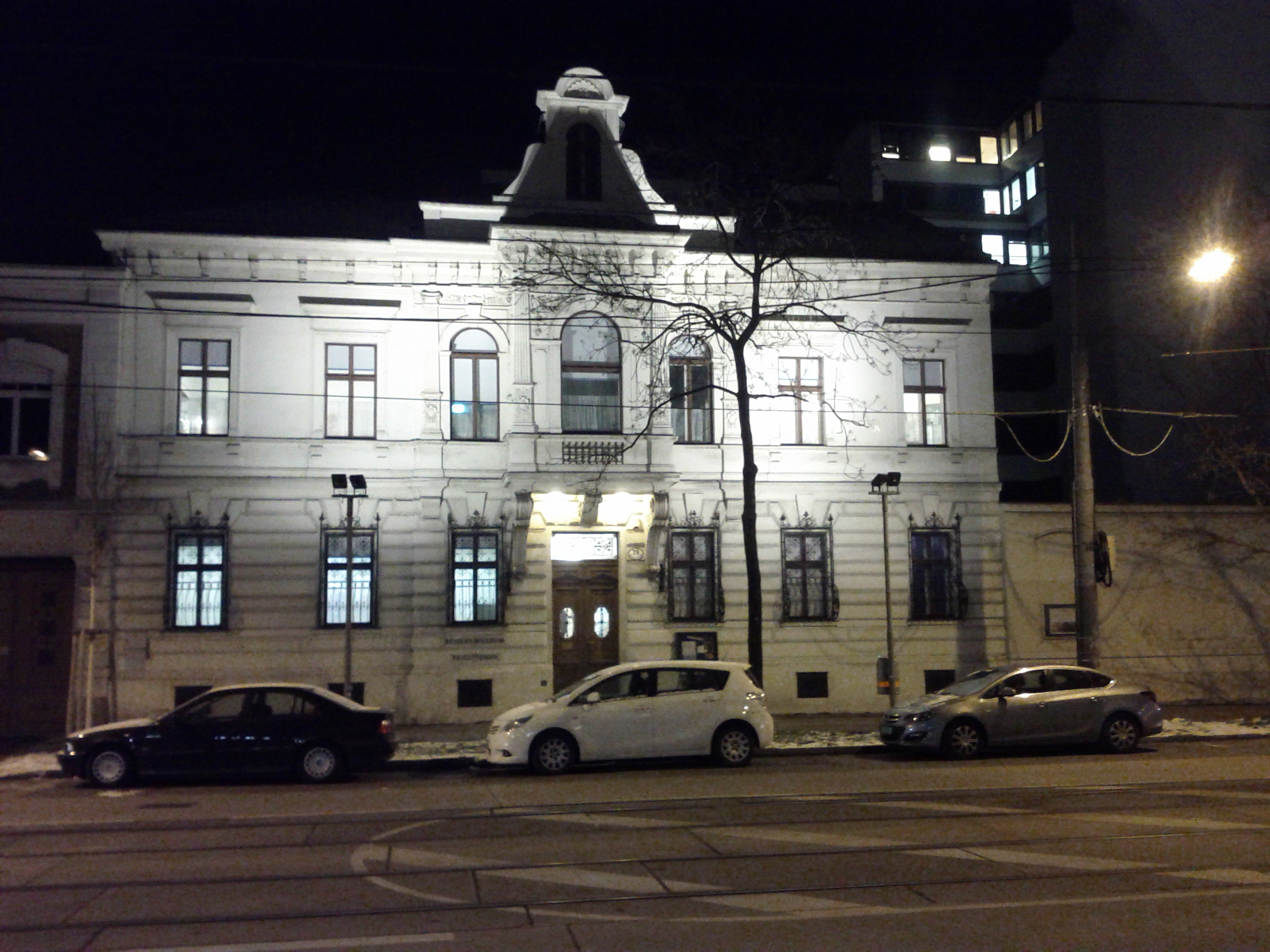
Night view

Already in the 1930s, there was a relevant local history museum on Wallensteinplatz. At the beginning of today's district museum stood a private collection of the Brigittenauer police district inspector Heinrich Zwicker (1919–1991). The collection was shown in the building Wallensteinplatz 5–6 with the support of district chief Karl Michal in the 1950s. Zwicker collected on his tours as a policeman for decades materials and spread the district history in photo lectures in restaurants.

From 1960 the collection was shown as the "Brigittenauer Heimatmuseum" in the premises of the Volkshochschule Brigittenau in Raffaelgasse 13; Zwicker was active as curator, the museum was managed by Prof. Anton Raschka, who was strongly committed to founding the museum.

Later Heinrich Zwicker withdrew from the project due to differences in personnel. A new collection had to be built up for the museum. From April 1984, the museum was housed for ten years at Engerthstraße 60–74 in former health insurance rooms.

== Location ==
In May 1994 the museum was opened in a building built in 1889 in the Historicist style, later the villa of the manufacturer Friedrich Bertram (the so-called "Bertram-Schlössl"). A commemorative plaque was noted in the building: The building of today's museum in Dresdner Straße 79 was originally built by the Friedrich and Anna Schmid family in 1889 as a residential building, on foundations a ferry house, which was later purchased by the industrialist Bertram and used as an office and residential building. Before that, the company Friedrich Weichmann's Witwe, II. factory of signalling and lighting objects for railways, was located at the address.

Engineer Karl August Czeija (1843-1909) founded a workshop for mechanics and telegraph construction in Vienna in 1880. In 1884, the electrical engineer Franz Nissl (1852-1942) took a stake in the company, which was now called "Telephon- und Telegraphenfabrik Czeija, Nissl & Co. The company played a major role in the development of the telephone network of the Austro-Hungarian monarchy and built the first radio stations and radios in series from 1923. The company had been located on Dresdner Strasse since 1907 and used the Bertram-Schlössl. From 1957 the company was called "Standard Telephon- und Telegraphen-AG Czeija, Nissl & Co. (STT)", which became "ITT Austria GmbH" in 1970 (since 1987 "Alcatel Austria AG", currently "Alcatel-Lucent") and which moved out of the site at the end of the 1970s.

The villa, which has been vacant since 1981, was purchased by the City of Vienna together with the factory area behind it on Dresdner Strasse 75-79 and restored over two years. The total area is around 600 m^{2}, 200 m^{2} of which is accounted for by the depot in the attic.

The Bezirksmuseum is located near the stop Wien Traisengasse of the S-Bahn Wien at the North railway (Nordbahn) and the stop of the same name of the tram line 2 running through Dresdner Straße.

== Exhibition Collection ==
The museum uses plans, exhibits, pictures, views and models to document the development of the district located on an island between the Danube Canal and the Danube. Some themes are permanently shown in permanent exhibitions. In addition, there are special exhibitions of various sizes, which usually take place in the lecture hall on the ground floor or in the first large room on the first floor. Old views and plans related to the district can be seen in the artistically decorated staircase.

The other rooms on the first floor contain the basic exhibition on the industrial and cultural development of the district. In the first room on the street you can see exhibits on everyday history and social life. In the middle room, the exhibition "The Brigittenau before 1900" is shown, which deals with the development from a floodplain to an industrial area. Another room shows the technical development of the telephone and Austria's earliest radio station, Radio Hekaphon. The company "Czeija, Nissl & Co", at that time a leading high-tech company, conducted the radio test operation at today's WUK (Kulturzentrum) in 1923/1924 until Radio Verkehrs AG (RAVAG) started its regular operation.

At the back is the transport sector, among other things. A model of a forerunner of the tram in Vienna, the Brigittenauer Pferdebahn (tram with horses), can be seen. A large model shows the Wien Nordwestbahnhof (Northwest Station) near the museum during its time as a passenger station. A memorial exhibition of Robert Blum, including original letters, commemorates the life of this 1848 revolutionary who was executed in Brigittenau. The exhibition "Brigittenau in the Resistance" recalls the time of National Socialism and the victims of the Holocaust in the district. The Red Vienna and the Brigittenau, the once very famous Brigitta church around the Brigitta Chapel, the entertainment establishments "Colosseum" and "Universum", the Brigitta Hospital and the Men's Home at Meldemannstraße 27, where Adolf Hitler temporarily lived, are also part of the exhibition.

The permanent exhibition "Brigittenau - location for trade, commerce and industry" illustrates the economic development of Brigittenau with pictures and objects. The spectrum of companies compiled by the curator Ernst Schättle so far ranges from the gingerbread baking tin to the stovepipe. The company headquarters are marked on a large district map. The following companies are currently on display:

Nr	Name of company	Business	active at 20. district	Location
03	Jurany & Wolfrum	Engineering	1899–1990	Pasettistraße 29-31
08	Hofbauer Schokoladefabrik	Confectionary	1958–1994	Brigittenauer Lände 168
13	Kühler- und Metallwarenfabrik	Metal processing	1918–	Stromstraße 26-28
14	Gebrüder Hardy	Hydraulics / Pneumatics	1889–1942	Höchstädtplatz 4
15	WABCO Westinghouse	Hydraulics / Pneumatics	1963–1998	Höchstädtplatz 4
19	Wiener Brückenbau und Eisenkonstruktions A. G.	Steel- / Vehicle construction	1920–1938	Engerthstraße 115
20	Globus-Verlag	Newspapers	1945–1993	Höchstädtplatz 3
25	Nordsee Deutsche Hochseefischerei	Fish & Seafood	1899–	Nordwestbahnhof
27	Bertrams	Stovepipes	1876–2014	Handelskai 100
28	Capo	Bicycles	1930–2017	Wallensteinstraße 33
29	Anna u. Hans Dögl	Food		
30	Erwin Fellner	Butcher	1931–	Klosterneuburger Straße 29
32	Fross - Büssing	Buses / trucks	1909–1945	Nordwestbahnstraße 53
35	Robert Kammerer	Gingerbread factory	1938–	Dammstraße 39
37	Kremenezky, Mayer & Co	Light bulb factory	1909–1931	Dresdner Straße 55–57
38	+CERTEC+ Elemente GmbH KROMUS - STAHL	Steel construction	1907–	Dresdner Straße 107
40	Walter Mantl - Mussak	Confectioner	1912–	Marchfeldstraße 12
42	s::can Messtechnik GmbH (Start-up)	Measuring technique	1999–	Brigittagasse 22
43	Schiffbautechnische Versuchsanstalt (SVA) / Vienna Model Basin Ltd	Research Institute	1912–	Brigittenauer Lände 256
44	Tmej Rudolf GmbH - Fabrik für technische Federn	Technical springs	1946–	Nordwestbahnstraße 77-79
45	Vereinigte Eisfabriken und Kühlhallen in Wien	Ice production	1898–	Pasettistraße 76
47	Wiener öffentliche Küchenbetriebsgesellschaft (WÖK) / Wigast	Canteen kitchen	1919–	
49	Zuckerltante e.U. Monika Erhart	Confectionery store	1922–	Klosterneuburger Straße 30
50	Leonardelli La Gelateria	Ice cream parlour	1890–	Klosterneuburger Straße 50
51	Hut & Stiel - Die Wiener Pilzkultur (Start-up)	Mushroom growing	2015–	Innstraße 5

An exhibition in an outbuilding shows the development of the Danube. It plays a very important role for the Brigittenau, which lies on an island between the Donaukanal (Danube Canal) and the Danube. Topics are the floods, the history of the Vienna Danube regulations, the first from 1870 and the second from 1972, which led to the construction of the New Danube. A central piece of the exhibition is the 1996 Danube Atlas, a unique technical and cultural-historical documentation with 280 maps and plans from the area from Korneuburg to Fischamend. Other topics include shipping, fishing on the Danube and electricity construction work.

In addition to the exhibitions, the museum offers further information. There is a library, negative images, a slide archive, video documentation and a collection of journals and documents. The museum also has materials on Eastern history (at the time of Austria-Hungary) and the Glagolitic script.

== Special exhibitions ==
- 2018: Sakrale Bauten in der Brigittenau. Part of the cross-district exhibition Sacral buildings in Vienna
- 2017: Zuagrast. Interesting facts about migration in the past and in the present
- 2015: Freizeit - freie Zeit? Leisure - free time?
- 2014: Frieden ohne Grenzen - Alfred Hermann Fried
- 2013: Selbstgemacht. Handicrafts between having to and wanting
- 2009: Der Nordwestbahnhof über drei Jahrhunderte. The Northwest Station over three centuries.
- 2009: Bei uns im 20sten. 35 Jahre Gebietsbetreuung. Over the local housing support.
- 2008: Gedenken an Robert Blum. Revolutionary from 1848.
- 2008: Der Widerstand gegen die Schreckensherrschaft der Nazis Resistance to the Nazi reign of terror.
- 2007: Pesterzsébet, the 20th district of Budapest
- 2005: Die Schweden vor Wien. The Swedes before Vienna in the Thirty Years' War.
- 2004: 10 Jahre Bezirksmuseum Brigittenau in der Dresdner Straße und die Brigittenau in dieser Zeit. 10th anniversary of the museum.
- 2003: Kind in der Brigittenau. Kid in the county.
- 1995: Wien räumt auf. 50th anniversary of the liberation of Vienna
