= Birge Schade =

German film actress (born 1965)

- Born: 7 February 1965 (age 61); Wilster, Germany
- Occupation: Actress
- Years active: 1989-present

Birge Schade (born 7 February 1965) is a German film actress. She appeared in more than ninety films since 1989.

== Selected filmography ==
Film
Year	Title	Role	Notes
1990	Summer Days	Isabelle	
1996	Beyond Silence	Lilli	
2000	The Desert Rose	Klara von Sellin	TV film
2002	Baader	Ulrike Meinhof	
2002	Hotte in Paradise	Rosa	TV film
2003	Cats' Tongues	Nora	TV film
2004	Am I Sexy?	Jutta Falken	
2004	Mord am Meer	Sylvia Glauberg	TV film
2008	Heat Wave	Sabine Hoffmann	TV film
2009	Pretty Mama	Karin Dittmann	TV film
2009	Men in the City	Beate	
2010	Kennedy's Brain	Diana Botha	TV film
2011	Rough	Tania	
2014	Stations of the Cross	Sports Teacher	

TV Series
Year	Title	Role	Notes
2006, 2010	Der Kriminalist		
2023	Dear Child	Nurse Ruth	
