= The Old School of Capitalism =

- Directed by: Želimir Žilnik
- Written by: Želimir Žilnik
- Produced by: Sarita Matijevic
- Starring: Živojin Popgligorin; Lazar Stojanović; Branimir Stojanović; Zoran Paroški; Ratibor Trivunac; Slobodan Marković; Rade Ćurčin
- Cinematography: Miodrag Milosevic
- Edited by: Vuk Vukmirovic
- Release date: August 30, 2009
- Running time: 122 minutes
- Country: Serbia
- Language: Serbo-Croatian

The Old School of Capitalism (Serbo-Croatian: Stara škola kapitalizma) is a 2009 feature film directed by Serbian director Želimir Žilnik.

== Plot ==
The film is mixture of documentary and fiction examining the new god of capitalism offered to the Serbs with the ending of state socialism. The story's background are a number of strikes in Belgrade during the late 2000s and these introduce us to a number of characters who play themselves. Explosive situations result with employees dressed in American football helmets and pads square up with employers' heavies in their bullet-proof vests.

A visit from the Russian tycoon's representative and vice president Joe Biden's arrival complicate the proceedings further.

== Reception ==
The Rotterdam Film Festival's review argues that it is an "intriguing docu-drama observes with x-ray eyes and in a sharp tone what's going on in the new Serbia. No lazy ideological analysis, but a complex and yet lighthearted portrait of the consequences of globalised capitalism for a country that has only just joined in the game."

== See also ==
- Želimir Žilnik
