= Zoran Radmilović =

Serbian actor

- Зоран Радмиловић
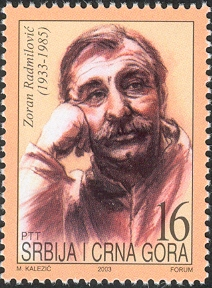
- Radmilović on a 2003 Serbia and Montenegro stamp.
- Born: 11 May 1933; Zaječar, Kingdom of Yugoslavia
- Died: 21 July 1985 (aged 52); Belgrade, SR Serbia, SFR Yugoslavia
- Education: Faculty of Dramatic Arts
- Alma mater: University of Arts in Belgrade
- Years active: 1959–1985
- Height: 1.78 m (5 ft 10 in)
- Spouse: Dina Rutić

Zoran Radmilović (Serbian Cyrillic: Зоран Радмиловић; 11 May 1933 – 21 July 1985) was a Serbian actor who had some of the most memorable roles in the history of former Yugoslav cinema.

He studied law, architecture and philology at the University of Belgrade, only to discover acting as his true calling. After graduating at Drama Arts Academy he joined Beogradsko dramsko pozoriste (Belgrade Drama Theatre). In the 1960s he joined Atelje 212 Theatre, where he became famous for his role of Kralj Ibi (King Ubu).

International audiences know him best for his role in 1971 cult film WR: Mysteries of the Organism. Audiences in former Yugoslavia know him best for his role of Bili Piton (Billy the Python) in 1982 cult comedy The Marathon Family and eponymous role in Dušan Kovačević's play Radovan Treći (Radovan III).

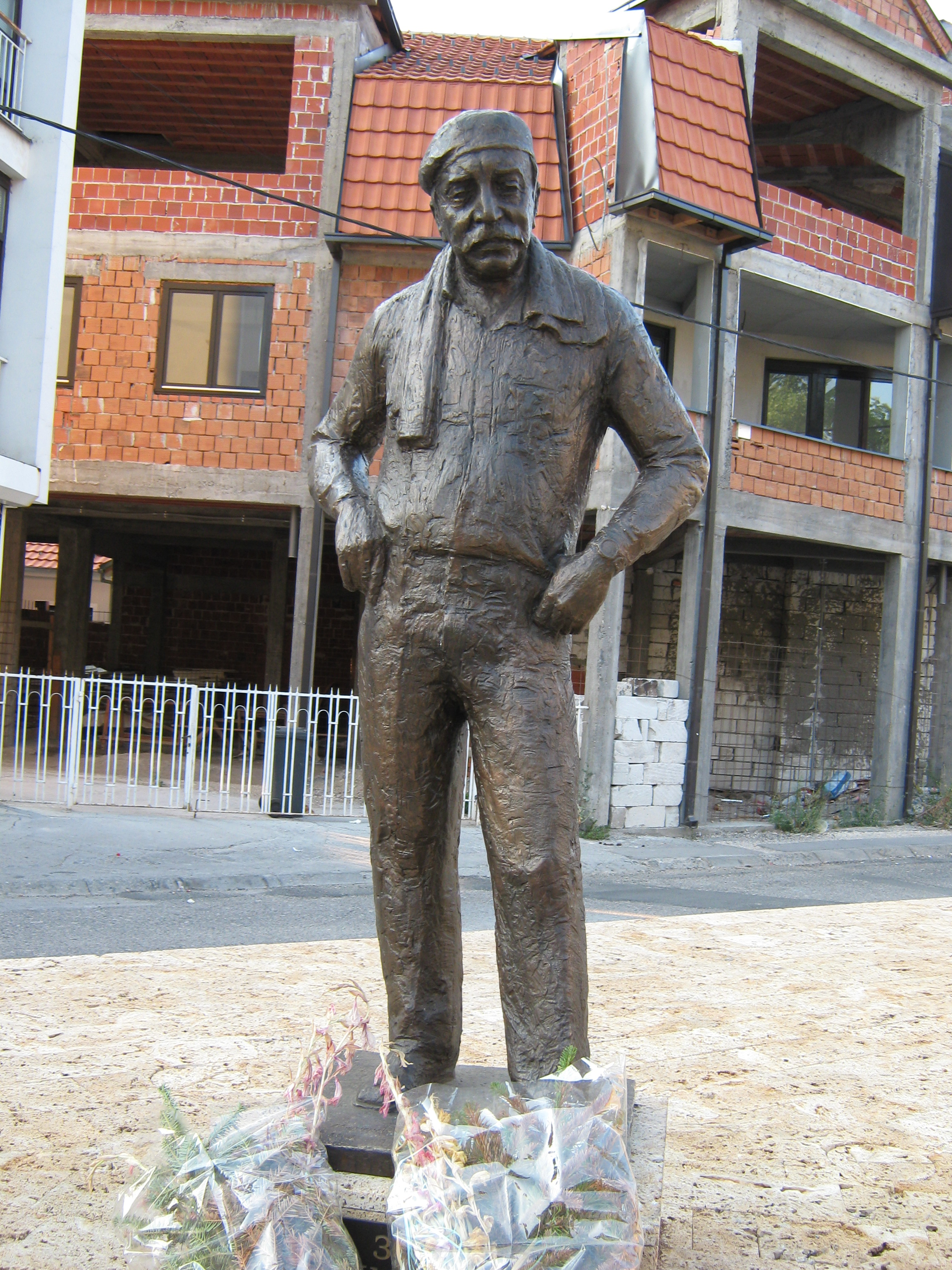
A statue of Radmilović was erected in his hometown Zaječar in April 2008.

One of his last roles was in 1985 film When Father Was Away on Business, in which he appeared together with Slobodan Aligrudić. He died shortly after the film won Palme d'Or at the Cannes Film Festival, and Aligrudić died shortly after him, leading many film critics of former Yugoslavia to state that "heaven had received a huge boost".

In December 2000 he was ranked first in the Serbian newspaper Večernje novosti in the Best Serbian Actors and Actresses of the 20th Century list.
