= Young and Healthy as a Rose =

- Directed by: Jovan Jovanović
- Written by: Jovan Jovanović
- Produced by: Danko Ješić; Nedeljko Ješić
- Starring: Dragan Nikolić; María Baxa; Aleksandar Gavrić; Danilo Stojković
- Cinematography: Petar Lalović
- Edited by: Jovan Jovanović; Petar Aranđelović; Kleopatra Harisijades; Szabolcs Barta
- Music by: Dragan Cenerić
- Production company: Dunav film
- Release date: 14 July 1971
- Running time: 71 min
- Country: Yugoslavia
- Language: Serbo-Croatian

Young and Healthy as a Rose (Serbo-Croatian: Mlad i zdrav kao ruža, Serbian Cyrillic: Млад и здрав као ружа) is a 1971 Yugoslav feature film directed by Serbian director Jovan Jovanović. It belongs to the Yugoslav Black Wave movement.

== Plot ==
A young criminal from Belgrade, Stevan, nicknamed Stiv, engages in "borrowing" (a then-official term for theft) cars and petty crime. Along the way, he tells the audience about his antics and misconducts, summarising that every attempt to rehabilitate him has failed. Slowly rising to power, he starts to kill for money and lives a life of decadence, surrounded by sex and drugs. He attracts the attention of a police inspector, who becomes his accomplice. Stevan quickly takes over organized crime in the city. He becomes not only a celebrity but also an idol to young followers who take over buildings in the city for him. He shoots around town and, along with his followers, takes over Hotel Jugoslavija, where they are interviewed by reporters. A police chase breaks out and the camera follows Stevan in his attempt to escape, at the end of which he gets shot by a policeman. The scene is interrupted by footage of Stevan sitting outside a cafe, where he tells the audience that retribution against criminals is possible only in films, and that real-life criminals go unpunished for their crimes. He ends with the line "I am your future".

== Cast ==
- Dragan Nikolić as Stiv
- Aleksandar Gavrić as police investigator
- María Baxa
- Danilo Stojković

== Release and censorship ==
After its official release, the film was shown only twice: at the Pula Film Festival and at the Student's Cultural Center in Belgrade. Screenings were stopped due to its perceived anti-establishment content, although it was never officially banned. The premiere also coincided with several other films such as Plastic Jesus and W.R.: Mysteries of the Organism, which provoked a regime reaction and confrontation with the Black Wave movement. The first subsequent public screening of the film took place 35 years after its release, as part of the 2006 FEST.

== Themes ==
The film, which found inspiration in politically charged films that were popular in the world at the time that promoted anti-establishment rebellion, was made in the style of the French New Wave, which includes non-linear narration and the protagonist's inner monologue that runs parallel to the plot. Most of the film was shot with a hand-held camera, which gives it a documentary feel.

Some critics dubbed the film's final line, "I am your future", as prophetic, primarily due to the similarities between Stevan and real-life criminals such as Arkan, as well as the film's allusion to the close ties between Yugoslav secret services and organized crime, which had a significant impact on the events in Yugoslavia and Serbia in the 1990s.

== Legacy ==
The Yugoslav Film Archive, in accordance with its authorities based on the Law on Cultural Heritage, declared one hundred Serbian feature films (1911–1999) as cultural heritage of great importance on December 28, 2016. Young and Healthy as a Rose is also on that list.
