= Artificial Paradise (film) =

1990 film

- Directed by: Karpo Acimovic-Godina
- Written by: Branko Vucicevic
- Produced by: FS Viba
- Starring: Jürgen Morche
- Cinematography: Tomislav Pinter
- Release date: 29 May 1990
- Running time: 98 minute
- Country: Yugoslavia
- Language: Slovene

Artificial Paradise (Slovene: Umetni raj) is a 1990 Yugoslav film directed by Karpo Acimovic-Godina. It was screened out of competition at the 1990 Cannes Film Festival.

== Cast ==
- Jürgen Morche as Fritz Lang
- Vlado Novak as Karol Gatnik
- Željko Ivanek as Willy
- Nerine Kidd as Rose Schwartz
- Manca Košir as Gospa iz Budimpeste
- Majda Potokar as Micka
