= Jovan Jovanović (film director) =

Serbian film director, screenwriter, editor (1940–2022)

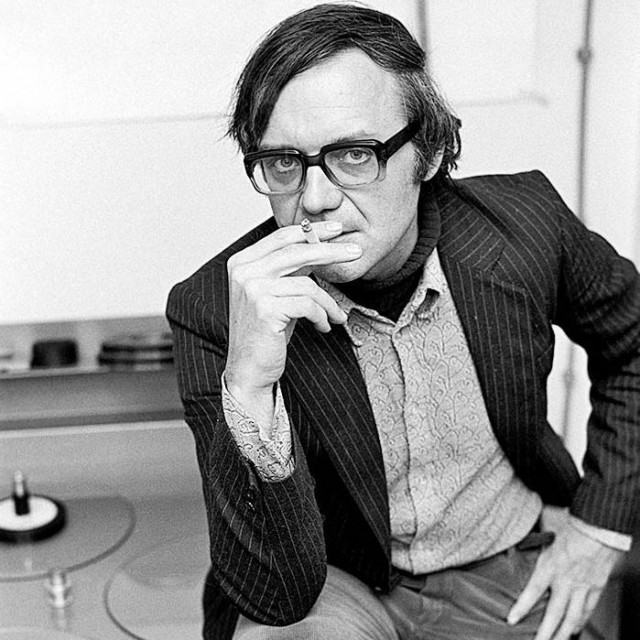
- Jovanović ca. 1970s
- Born: 31 May 1940; Belgrade, Kingdom of Yugoslavia
- Died: 3 August 2022 (aged 82); Belgrade, Serbia
- Education: Faculty of Dramatic Arts, University of Arts in Belgrade
- Occupations: film director, screenwriter

Jovan "Joca" Jovanović (31 May 1940 — 3 August 2022) was a Serbian director, screenwriter, editor and film theorist.

== Biography ==
Jovanović was born on May 31, 1940, in Belgrade, then Kingdom of Yugoslavia. He graduated in film directing at the Belgrade Academy of Theater, Film, Radio and Television with the medium-length feature film Distinctly Me (1967). His documentary film Kolt 15 Gap (1971) won awards at festivals in Oberhausen, Utrecht and Belgrade, was included in the Anthology of Films of the Oberhausen Festival (published on the occasion of the 50th anniversary of the festival), and the American film historian Erik Barnouw included it in his book Documentary – A History of the Non-Fiction Film.

In the early 90s, he moved to Ljubljana. In an interview from 2010, Jovanović expressed the view that domestic pseudo-elites are the greatest danger for the Serbian nation.

He is the author of the book Introduction to Film Thought.

== Filmography ==
=== Feature films ===
- Distinctly Me (1967)
- Young and Healthy as Rose (1971)
- Landscapes in the Mist (1983)

=== Documentary films ===
- Self-portrait (1961)
- University Town (1965)
- Kolt 15 Gap (1971)
- Rrevolution that flows (1972)
- Working Class Artists (1975)
- Drug Addicts (1976)
- The Man Who Created Systems (1990)
