= Baader (film) =

2002 German film

- Directed by: Christopher Roth
- Screenplay by: Christopher Roth; Moritz von Uslar
- Produced by: Stephan Fruth; Christopher Roth; Mark Glaser
- Starring: Frank Giering; Laura Tonke; Vadim Glowna; Birge Schade
- Cinematography: Bella Halben; Jutta Pohlmann
- Edited by: Barbara Ries; Cristopher Roth
- Music by: Bob Last
- Release date: 15 February 2002 (Germany)
- Running time: 110 minutes
- Country: Germany
- Language: German
- Box office: $81,000

Baader is a 2002 German film directed by Christopher Roth. It is a biopic about revolutionary Andreas Baader of the notorious Red Army Faction ("the Baader-Meinhof Gang") which operated mainly in West Germany during the 1970s.

The leading roles are played by Frank Giering (Andreas Baader) and Laura Tonke (Gudrun Ennslin). Birge Schade portrays Ulrike Meinhof.

Though the script is inspired by real-life persons and events, the storyline of the film continuously mixes fact and fiction.

== Soundtrack ==
The soundtrack was released in 2002 on Normal Records with bands like Can, Suicide, Stone Roses, Trans Am and Campag Velocet.

== Quotes ==
Rather than historical realism, Baader provides quotation as a means to convey its portrait of the revolutionaries. Instead of naturalistic dialogue, the characters often intone excerpts from interviews, articles, speeches, prison notes, or other sources from the historical record. One example is a scene late in the film. Whiele shooting rounds, Meinhof turns and calmly says, „When the time is ripe for the revolution, it will be too late to prepare it.“

— Matthias Frey, Postwall German Cinema. History, Film History and Cinephilia, p. 51

== Awards ==
2002: Silver Bear Jury Prize of Berlin International Film Festival in the category Neue Perspektiven der Filmkunst (English New perspectives of cinematography), Christopher Roth

== See also ==
- Der Baader Meinhof Komplex
- If Not Us, Who?
- Stammheim – Die Baader-Meinhof-Gruppe vor Gericht
