= Radio Hekaphon =

- Vienna; Austria
- Broadcast area: Viena metropolitan area
- Frequency: 500 kHz

Programming
- Language: Austrian
- Format: Talk radio and Music

Ownership
- Owner: Vereinigten Telephonfabriken AG Czeija, Nissl & Co. (Western Electric subsidiary)

History
- First air date: April 1, 1923
- Last air date: September 1, 1924

Technical information
- Licensing authority: Didn't exist back then
- Power: 100 watts
- Transmitter coordinates: 48.223258 N 16.351418 E

Radio Hekaphon was the first radio broadcasting station in Austria. It was founded on private initiative and successfully operated from April 1, 1923 until ceasing operations on September 1, 1924. It was considered a pirate radio station though the government itself wasn't sure about if and how to regulate it.

== Sources ==
- Haimo Godler: Vom Dampfradio zur Klangtapete: Beiträge zu 80 Jahren Hörfunk in Österreich. Böhlau Verlag, Wien 2004.
- Peter Knezu: Radio HEKAPHONE - The first pirate broadcast transmitter in Austria. In: Second IEEE Region 8 Conference on the History of Telecommunications (HISTELCON). ISBN 978-1-4244-7450-9
