= Miloš Aligrudić =

Serbian politician and lawyer

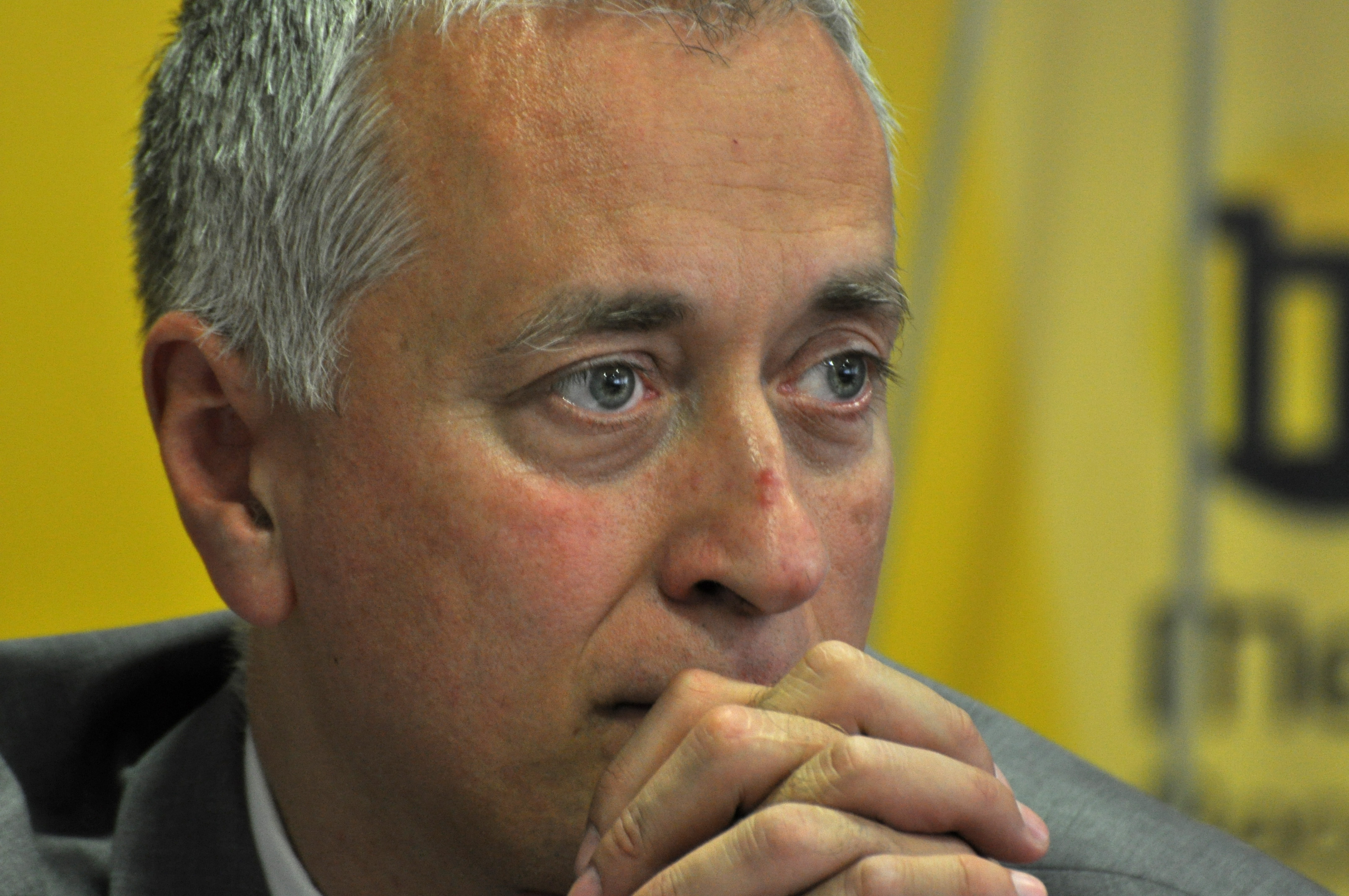
Aligrudić in June 2011

Miloš Aligrudić (Serbian Cyrillic: Милош Алигрудић; born 6 December 1964 in Belgrade, Yugoslavia) is a Serbian politician and lawyer by profession. He is the current head of the ministerial group of the Democratic Party of Serbia in the National Assembly. In 2008, he was elected vice-president of the Parliamentary Assembly of the Council of Europe, where he is Head of Serbian delegation. He graduated from the University of Belgrade's Law School.

His father was famous Serbian actor Slobodan Aligrudić.
