= Adem Čejvan =

Bosnian actor

Adem Ćejvan
- Born: 2 March 1927; Banja Luka, Kingdom of Serbs, Croats and Slovenes
- Died: 5 November 1989 (aged 62); Ljubljana, SR Slovenia, SFR Yugoslavia

Adem Ćejvan (2 March 1927 – 5 November 1989) was a Bosnian actor.

== Filmography ==
Film
Year	Film	Role	Notes
1970	Handcuffs	Andrija	
1970	Druzba Pere Kvrzice	Perov otac	
1971	Dan duzi od godine	Drzavni	
1971	Ovcar	Milan	
1972	The Deer Hunt	Kosta	
1972	Zvezde su oci ratnika	Srbislav Vuletic	
1972	Slike iz zivota udarnika		
1974	Polenov prah		
1975	Poznajete li Pavla Plesa?	Pavle Ples	
1975	Djavolje merdevine	Vuk Matić 'Brka'	11 episodes
1975	Anno Domini 1573	Trgovac Mikula	
1978	Ljubav i bijes		
1979	Osma ofanziva	Stanko Veselica	6 episodes
1979	Osvajanje slobode		
1981	Siroko je lisce	Mrksic	
1982	Hocu zivjeti	Emil Kovac	
1983	Pismo - Glava		
1985	Price iz fabrike	Brko	3 episodes
1987	Bolji život	Medicinski brat	3 episodes
1987	Vuk Karadžić	Mladen Milovanović	7 episodes
