= Bahrudin Čengić =

Bosnian film director

- Born: 7 January 1931; Maglaj, Vrbas Banovina, Kingdom of Yugoslavia
- Died: 16 October 2007 (aged 76); Sarajevo, Bosnia and Herzegovina
- Occupations: film director, screenwriter
- Years active: 1955–92

Bahrudin "Bato" Čengić (7 January 1931 – 16 October 2007) was a Bosnian screenwriter and film director who was active in Yugoslavia.

== Biography ==
Čengić was born in 1931, although some sources give 7 January 1933 as the date of birth.

During the war in Bosnia and Herzegovina, Čengić filmed over 1,000 minutes of the Siege of Sarajevo, which he converted in a documentary "essay" called Sarajevo.

He appeared in the 2007 documentary Zabranjeni bez zabrane. Čengić died in Sarajevo on 16 October 2007, aged 76.

== Filmography ==
=== Films ===
Year	Film	Notes
1962	Kozara	assistant director; credited as Bato Čengić
1963	Dani	assistant director
1964	Narodni poslanik	first assistant director; credited as Bato Čengić
1964	Na mesto građanine pokorni	second assistant director
1966	Povratak	assistant director; English title: The Return
1967	Mali vojnici	English title: Playing Soldiers
1970	The Twelve Chairs	assistant director; credited as Bato Čengić
1971	Uloga moje porodice u svjetskoj revoluciji	writer; English title: The Role of My; Family in the Revolution
1972	Slike iz života udarnika	writer; English title: Life of a Shock; Force Worker
1978	Ljubav i bijes	first assistant director; credited as Bato Čengić
1983	Pismo - Glava	writer; English title: Heads or Tails
1990	Gluvi barut	writer; English title: Silent Gunpowder
1992	Albania	

=== Documentaries ===
Year	Documentary	Notes
1955	Lasta	writer
1955	Tehnika	writer
1958	Deset na jednog	writer
1961	Čovjek bez lica	writer
1961	Krilati karavani	writer
1961	Ljudi sa rijeke	writer
1966	Soyez le bienvenu, dobro došli	writer
1980	Sarajevo drugačiji grad	writer
1984	Rudnik danas	writer
2007	Zabranjeni bez zabrane	as himself; documentary

=== Television ===
Year	Show	Notes
1976	Jagoš i Uglješa	Television film; credited as Bato Čengić
1977	Zovem se Eli	Television film
1978	Ljubav u jedanaestoj	Television film
1979	Ujed	Television film
1985	Ukazanje Gospe u selu Grabovica	Television film; credited as Bato Čengić

=== Short films ===
Year	Short	Notes
1976	Život je lijep	writer
1981	Čovjek sa satom	writer
