= Love Affair, or the Case of the Missing Switchboard Operator =

1967 Yugoslav film

- Italian Movie Poster
- Directed by: Dušan Makavejev
- Written by: Dušan Makavejev; Branko Vučićević
- Starring: Eva Ras; Slobodan Aligrudić
- Cinematography: Aleksandar Petković
- Edited by: Katarina Stojanović
- Production company: Avala Film
- Release date: 1967
- Running time: 79 minutes
- Country: Yugoslavia
- Language: Serbo-Croatian

Love Affair, or the Case of the Missing Switchboard Operator (Serbo-Croatian: Ljubavni slučaj ili tragedija službenice P.T.T.) is a 1967 Yugoslav film directed by Dušan Makavejev.

== Plot ==
The film begins with a sexologist in his office, talking about the history of sex.

Izabela, an ethnic Hungarian switchboard operator, meets and falls in love with a Sandžak Muslim sanitation inspector named Ahmed, who soon moves into her apartment and has a shower installed. The film then cuts away to a police investigation of the death of a young woman by drowning. Ahmed goes away on business for a month. During his absence, Izabela finally gives in to a persistently amorous postman.

When Ahmed returns, he finds Izabela different, less loving. (She has found out she is pregnant.) He gets very drunk, and when Isabella chases after him to keep him from harm, he threatens to commit suicide by jumping into an underground cistern. However, Ahmed ends up accidentally pushing Izabela in instead, killing her. He goes into hiding, but is arrested by the police for murder. The film concludes with a scene of Ahmed and Izabela walking down a staircase.

== Cast ==
- Eva Ras as Izabela
- Slobodan Aligrudić as Ahmed
- Ružica Sokić as Ruža
- Miodrag Andrić as Mića
- Aleksander Kostic as Ekspert za seksualna pitanja (as Dr Aleksandar Dj Kostic)
- Zivojin Aleksic as Ekspert za kriminalistiku (as Dr Zivojin L Aleksic)
- Dragan Obradovic as Obducent (as Dr Dragan Obradovic)
- Rade Ljubisavljevic as Vodoinstalater
- Aca Tadic as Jorgandzija

== Reception ==
On the review aggregator website Rotten Tomatoes, 100% of 11 critics' reviews are positive, with an average rating of 7.4/10. Roger Ebert gave the film 3 and a half stars out of 4, describing Makavejev's films as "direct, candid, occasionally crude and conceived in marvelously bad taste. They are also tender and funny," and that "You have to be the victim of a certain state of mind to appreciate the humor and truth" of the director.

== Home media ==
It was released as part of the three-film DVD collector's set Eclipse Series 18: Dušan Makavejev—Free Radical by the Criterion Collection.
