= Želimir Žilnik =

Serbian and Yugoslav filmmaker (born 1942)

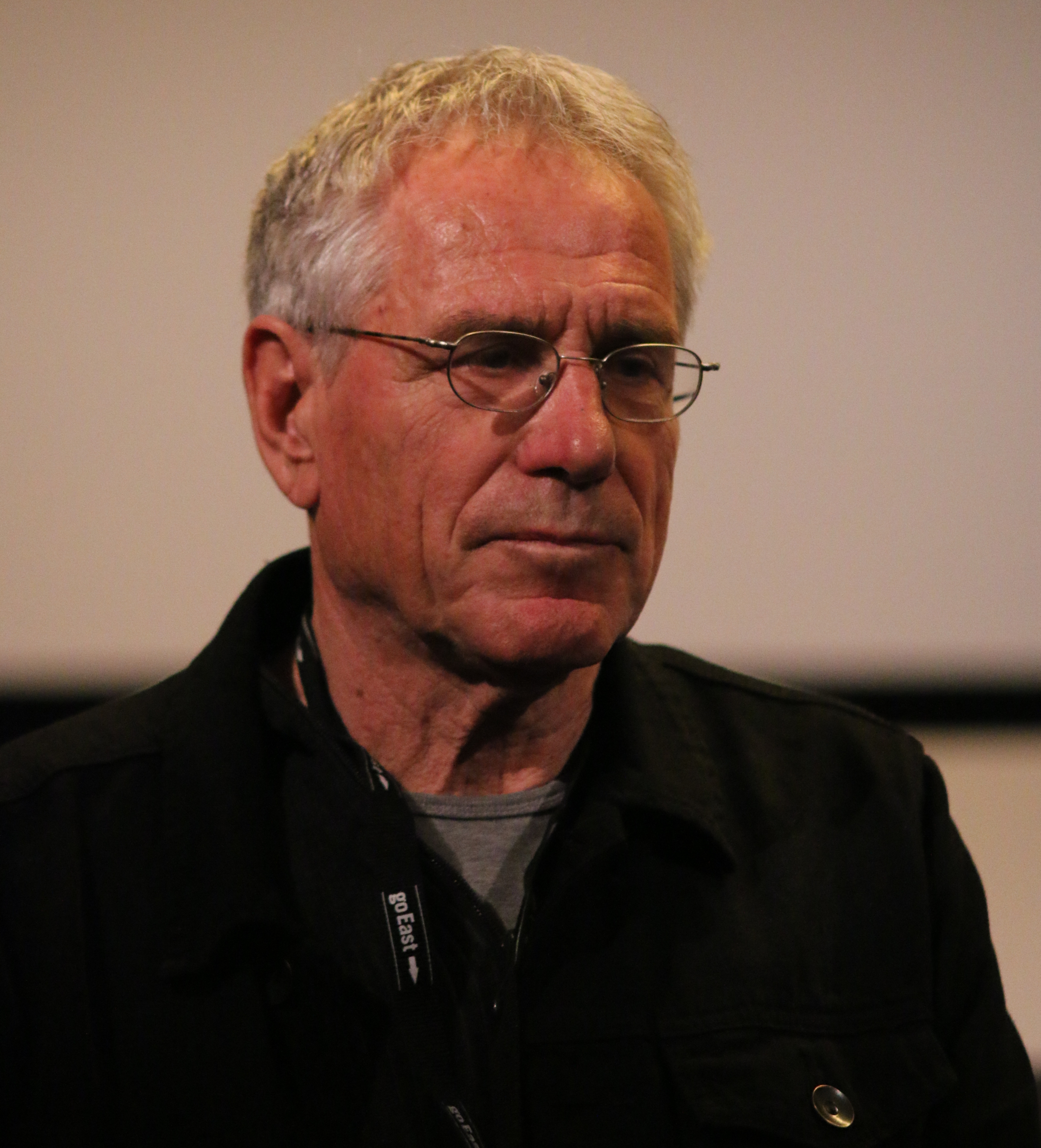
- Žilnik in 2015
- Born: 8 September 1942 (age 84); Niš, German-occupied Serbia
- Education: University of Novi Sad
- Occupation: Filmmaker
- Years active: 1967–present
- Spouse: Sarita Matijević
- Website: http://zilnikzelimir.net/

Želimir Žilnik (Serbian Cyrillic: Желимир Жилник; pronounced [ʒɛ̌limiːr ʒîlniːk]; born 8 September 1942) is a Serbian film director best known as one of the major figures of the Yugoslav Black Wave film movement of the 1960s and 1970s, having won several awards, including the Golden Bear 1969 and the Teddy Award 1995 at the Berlin International Film Festival.

== Early life ==
Žilnik was born in 1942 in the Gestapo-run Crveni Krst concentration camp near the city of Niš in southern occupied Serbia. Both of his parents were Communist activists who would end up executed while he was still an infant. His Serbian mother Milica "Maša" Šuvaković was executed in the concentration camp in December 1942, upon which 3-month-old Želimir was released from the camp and raised by his maternal grandparents. His Slovene father Konrad "Slobodan" Žilnik who fought as part of Partisan guerrillas in southern Serbia was captured and killed by Chetniks in March 1944, and posthumously honored as a Yugoslav People's Hero.

As a youth, Žilnik was the editor of a communist magazine called Tribina Mladih. As a student, he was chosen to take part in an international cultural exchange program in New York City, where he was first exposed to films that dealt with social and political criticisms. Upon his return to Yugoslavia, he took part in a cinema club and was hired as an assistant in a film by the director Dušan Makavejev.

== Career ==
Beginning in 1967, Žilnik became involved with the Neoplanta film production company. The company paved the way for a significant change of Yugoslav cinema with the production of films that explored socio-political criticisms, eventually leading to the Yugoslav Black Wave of film-making.

By the time Žilnik made his third short film Nezaposleni Ljudi (The Unemployed) in 1969 he had already become a recognized filmmaker. Nezaposleni Ljudi was criticized by the Communist Party of Yugoslavia for its portrayal of workers and the unemployment situation in Yugoslavia.

In 1969 Žilnik released his feature film Early Works (Rani radovi). The film, which was an allusion to Karl Marx's early writings, critiqued the Yugoslav communist regime and depicted the murder of a young woman named Jugoslava by her comrades after their revolutionary ideals failed to be implemented. In addition, it "portray[ed] a direct association between sex and politics" with the utilization of the naked body for shock value, widely taboo at the time. After initially being screened to audiences, Žilnik and the production company Avala Film were ordered by the authorities to stop production. Žilnik refused and was taken to court, where he successfully defended the film. It was sent to the 19th Berlin International Film Festival where it received a Golden Berlin Bear Award.

The suppression of his third film, Crni Film (an ironic take on the Black Wave dubbing) in 1971 and subsequent works led Žilnik to exile for a brief period in West Germany. There, he made films that were critical of the Gastarbeiter and addressed sensitive German societal topics. The German response was negative and he was forced to return to his home country.

Back in Yugoslavia he briefly worked in theatre production but soon returned to his previous work with documentaries. From 1977 to 1990, he primarily made television films but also two feature films along with a mini-series and several shorts.

In 1986 he made Pretty Women Walking Through the City (Lijepe žene prolaze kroz grad), a post-apocalyptic science fiction film which predicted that nationalist tensions would eventually cause the disintegration of Yugoslavia. His 1988 black comedy The Way Steel Was Tempered (Tako se kalio čelik) was nominated for the Golden St. George award at the 16th Moscow International Film Festival in the Soviet Union.

In 1994 he co-wrote (with the leading actor Dragoljub Ljubičić) and directed Tito's Second Time Among the Serbs (Tito po drugi put medju Srbima). His 1995 feature film Marble Ass (Dupe od mramora) was a look at the myth built around the masculinity of the male as a warrior and leader. It was entered into the 19th Moscow International Film Festival.

== Legacy ==
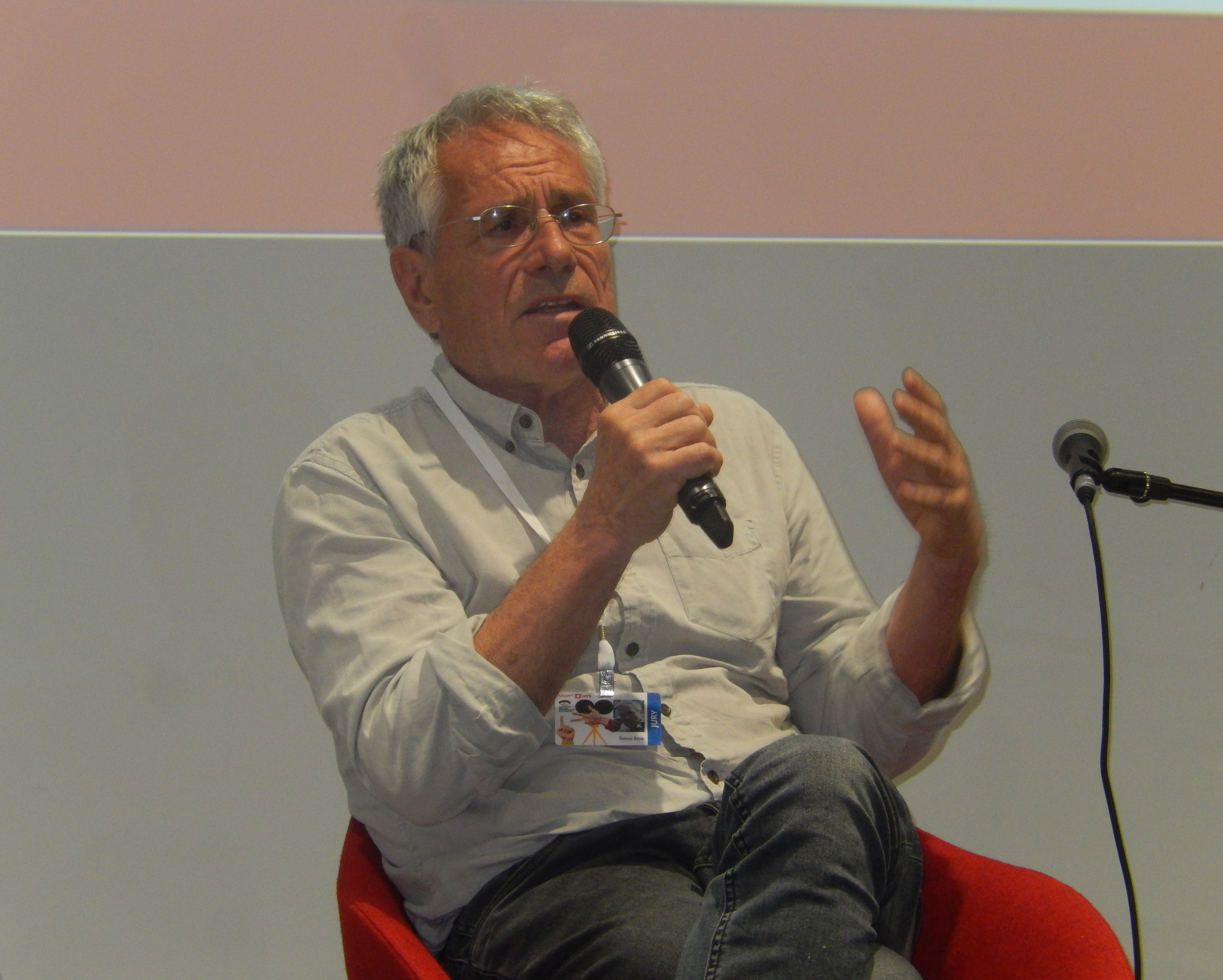
Žilnik giving a lecture (2016)

Žilnik is considered one of the most renowned directors of the Yugoslav Black Wave movement of the 1960s and 1970s.

Mann (2010) says that Žilnik "stands freely and independently as a humanist not bound to any political system or state, not bound to the formalities of the industry, and not bound to any conventional form of artistic expression" and that "from the beginning onwards, his films have been defiant, shameless, exaggerated, blatantly ironic, erotic, gory, anti-romantic, antiideal, whistle-blowing, highly taboo-breaking, low-budget, and highly controversial". The scholar Roland Hsu of Stanford University writes that "there is probably no filmmaker who has explored the dynamics of postwar European politics, economy and culture with more persistence and vigor" than Žilnik. His particular style of directing is recognized as pioneering the docudrama or "docu-fiction" genre. Many of his films are seen as a prophecy of future events, such as the Breakup of Yugoslavia, economic transition from socialism to neoliberalism, erosion of workers' rights and wider issues related to labor and migration.

In 2019 Žilnik was given a major career retrospective at Centre Pompidou in Paris, which included a commission for a new work. Near the end of 2019 Žilnik was also given a late-career survey at Close-Up Film Centre in London.

== Selected filmography ==
Year	Film	Director	Writer	Producer	Awards / Notes
1968	Nezaposleni Ljudi (The Unemployed)	Yes	Yes	No	Short film; First Prize at the International Short Film Festival Oberhausen in 1968
1969	Early Works (Rani radovi)	Yes	Yes	No	Golden Berlin Bear Award at the 19th Berlin International Film Festival
1971	Crni film (Black film)	Yes	Yes	No	Short film
1986	Pretty Women Walking Through the City (Lijepe žene prolaze kroz grad)	Yes	Yes	No	
1988	The Way Steel Was Tempered (Tako se kalio čelik)	Yes	Yes	No	Golden St. George Award nominee at the 16th Moscow International Film Festival
1994	Tito Among the Serbs for the Second Time (Tito po drugi put medju Srbima)	Yes	Yes	No	Documentary
1995	Marble Ass (Dupe od mramora)	Yes	Yes	No	Teddy Award at the 45th Berlin International Film Festival; Golden St. George Award nominee at the 19th Moscow International Film Festival
2006	Kenedi goes back home (Kenedi se vraća kući)	Yes	Yes	No	Documentary
2009	The Old School of Capitalism (Stara škola kapitalizma)	Yes	Yes	No	
2018	Das schönste Land der Welt (The Most Beautiful Country in the World)	Yes	Yes		featuring hor 29 novembar

== Sources ==
- Mann, Lena Kilkka (2010). "The Provocative Želimir Žilnik: from Yugoslavia's Black Wave to Germany's RAF" (PDF). Südslavistik Online (2): 35–57. ISSN 1868-0348.
