= Bogdan Tirnanić =

Serbian journalist (1941–2009)

Bogdan Tirnanić (Serbian Cyrillic: Богдан Тирнанић) (September 14, 1941 – January 16, 2009) was one of the most prominent Serbian journalists, essayists and movie critics. He was born in Belgrade, Serbia. He wrote columns for some of the most popular newspapers in the SFR Yugoslavia and Serbia, including Politika, Borba, NIN, Dnevni telegraf etc. He was awarded some of the most important awards in Yugoslav and Serbian journalism, such as Croatian Veselko Tenžera award.

His career also includes notable appearances in popular Serbian movies Early Works ("Rani radovi") and The Black Bomber (Crni bombarder). He was a member of the managing board of the football club Red Star Belgrade. He died in Belgrade in January 2009.

The Association of Journalists of Serbia awards a prize in memory of him.

== Personal ==
Tirnanić's first cousin once removed (colloquially: "uncle") was Yugoslav football icon Aleksandar Tirnanić. He was married to Serbian actress sr:Dara Džokić, they have one daughter together.
