= Karpo Godina =

Cinematographer

Karpo Ačimović Godina
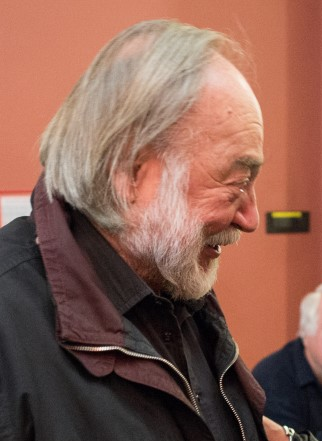
- Born: 26 June 1943 (age 82); Skopje, Yugoslavia (present-day North Macedonia)
- Occupations: Cinematographer; Film director
- Years active: 1968–2002

Karpo Ačimović Godina (born 26 June 1943) is a Slovenian cinematographer and film director. He is one of the most important representatives of the Yugoslav cinematic movement "Black Wave", which produced numerous socio-critical films between 1964 and 1973. His film Artificial Paradise was screened out of competition at the 1990 Cannes Film Festival.

== Selected filmography ==
- Occupation in 26 Pictures (1978)
- Artificial Paradise (1990)
- Red Boogie (1982)

== Bibliography ==
- Filmkollektiv Frankfurt, ed. (2013). On the cinema of Karpo Godina or A book in 71383 words, 225 pages, ISBN 978-3-00-044161-5.
