= Slobodan Aligrudić =

Serbian actor

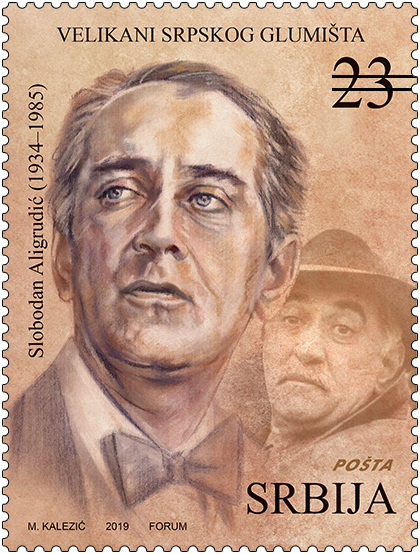
- Born: Slobodan Aligrudić; 15 October 1934; Bitola, Vardar Banovina, Kingdom of Yugoslavia
- Died: 13 August 1985 (aged 50); Gradac, SR Croatia, SFR Yugoslavia
- Years active: 1955–1985

Slobodan Aligrudić (Serbian Cyrillic: Слободан Алигрудић; 15 October 1934 – 13 August 1985) was a Serbian actor known for some of the most memorable roles in the history of former Yugoslav cinema.

== Biography ==
Aligrudić was born in Bitola. He earned prominence as a thespian in Belgrade's Atelje 212 Theatre, but to a wider audience he is best known for his memorable character portrayals on film. Some of those roles were achieved in classic films of former Yugoslav cinema, including Love Affair, or the Case of the Missing Switchboard Operator. Due to his distinctly coarse look, most of his roles were stern authority figures, but he always managed to give them a breath of humanity. One of the best examples is Maho, a father character in Emir Kusturica's 1981 coming-of-age drama Do You Remember Dolly Bell?.

Aligrudić worked with Kusturica again in his 1985 celebrated drama When Father Was Away on Business, in which he played an UDBA agent in charge of protagonist's "re-education". He died in Gradac (SR Croatia) shortly after that film won Palme d'Or at the Cannes Film Festival and shortly after the death of his long-time colleague Zoran Radmilović. This event led many former Yugoslav film critics to say that "heaven had received a huge boost".

His son Miloš Aligrudić is a high-ranking official of Vojislav Koštunica's Democratic Party of Serbia.

== Partial filmography ==
- Solaja (1955) - Skojevac
- Subotom uvece (1957) - Mladic (segment "Na kosavi") (uncredited)
- San (1966) - Milovan (voice, uncredited)
- Love Affair, or the Case of the Missing Switchboard Operator (1967) - Ahmed, sanitarni inspektor
- Kad budem mrtav i beo (1967) - Upravnik Milutin
- Bekstva (1968) - Albert
- Quo vadis Zivorade?! (1968) - General
- Zaseda (1969) - Jotic
- Rani radovi (1969)
- Bube u glavi (1970) - Silovatelj
- I Bog stvori kafansku pevacicu (1972) - Direktor hotela II
- Pukovnikovica (1972) - Kaplar II
- Zuta (1973) - Milicioner II
- Otpisani (1974) - Skale
- Naivko (1975) - Pura
- Povratak otpisanih (1976) - Drug Selja
- Specijalno vaspitanje (1977) - Komandir milicije
- Ljubavni zivot Budimira Trajkovica (1977) - Direktor OOUR-a
- Miris poljskog cveca (1977) - Inspektor za krvne delikte
- Nacionalna klasa (1979) - Funkcioner Vidoje
- Srecna porodica (1979)
- Who's Singin' Over There? (1980) - Porucnik
- Snovi, zivot, smrt Filipa Filipovica (1980)
- Erogena zona (1981) - Milicioner
- Do You Remember Dolly Bell? (1981) - Otac
- Kraljevski voz (1981) - Policajac Rapajic
- Decko koji obecava (1981) - Psihijatar
- Idemo dalje (1982) - Skolski nadzornik
- 13. jul (1982) - Covek sa kutijom sa mackama
- Variola vera (1982) - Drug Vlada
- Veliki transport (1983) - Novoverac Rade
- When Father Was Away on Business (1985) - Ostoja Cekic
- Indijsko ogledalo (1985) - Cale

Brisani Prostor (1985) - main police inspector Cica
