= Chelsea Film Festival =

Annual Film Festival held in New York City

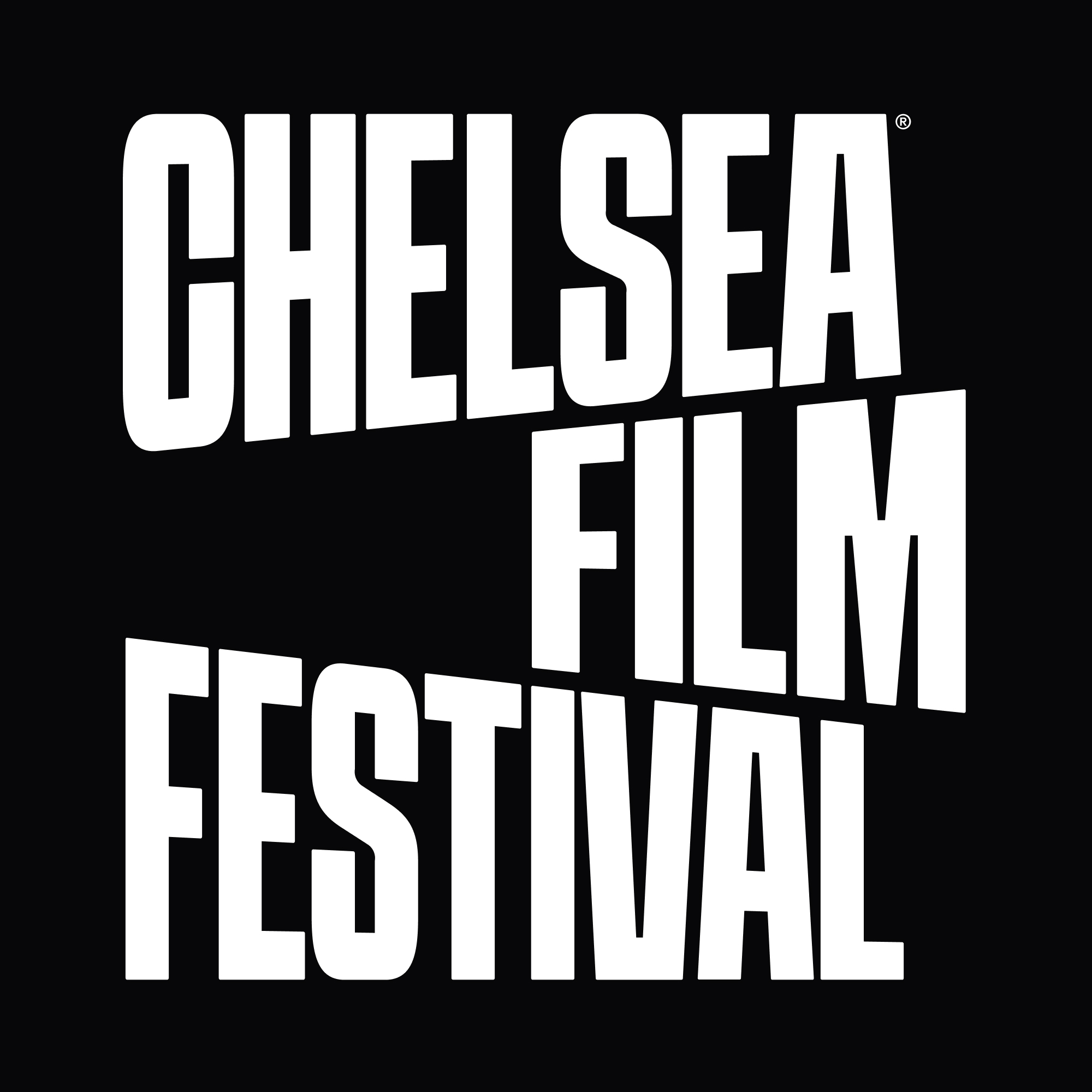
- Location: New York City, United States
- Founded: 2013
- Founded by: Ingrid Jean-Baptiste; Sonia Jean-Baptiste
- Website: www.chelseafilm.org

Chelsea Film Festival (CFF) is an international film festival and a non-profit organization based in New York which screens independent films from emerging and established directors. The festival offers a wide range of films, including documentaries and feature-lengths, focusing on the theme of “Global Issues”.

== History ==
Chelsea Film Festival was founded in 2013 by French actresses Ingrid Jean-Baptiste & Sonia Jean-Baptiste.

An advisory board was set up to oversee the selection of the films and the operation of the festival.

The first edition of the Chelsea Film Festival presented nine feature length-films and eight short films, representing 13 countries and 17 first-time filmmakers, including seven in competition. Eight of the films at the Festival were United States premieres, and one was a world premiere.

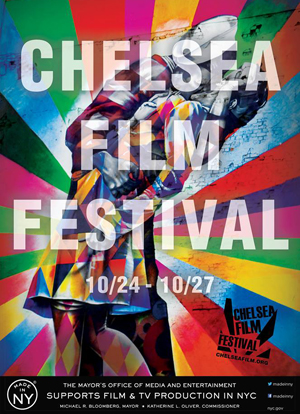
Chelsea Film Festival 2013 poster

In March 2019, Chelsea Film Festival was featured in the Top 10 Best Film Festivals in North America by the American Newspaper USA Today.

== Awards ==
Awards are presented in several categories; the winning films are selected by a jury of film experts as well as the audience. The "Charging Bull" replica for a time was the official trophy, until 2021 when the Chelsea Film Festival presented Acrylic trophies.

=== Grand Prix Award ===
Year	Film	Director
2026	Party USA	Jared Sprouse
2025	Death of My Youth	Timo Jacobs
2024	The City	Amit Ulman
2023	These Days	Edward Gonzalez Jr.
2022	All the Things I Wanted To Say	Assaf Gordon
2021	The Parent	Vlad Furman
2020	Keeping the Bees	Eylem Kaftan
2019	Bilched	Jeremy Cumpston
2013	LICKS	Jonathan Singer-Vine

=== Best Documentary Award ===
Year	Film	Director
2025	Deepfaking Sam Altman (feature)	Adam Bhala Lough
2025	Found Frequency (short)	Jack Hillyer
2024	Sono Lino (feature)	Jacob Patrick
2024	The Final Copy of Ilon Specht (short)	Ben Proudfoot

=== Audience Award ===
Year	Film	Director
2026	No Room For Love	Randal & Malou Kamradt
2021	Surviving on LES	Tony Amatullo
2020	Greyscale	Yaniel Paulino

=== Best Director Award ===
Year	Film(s)	Director(s)
2026	Party USA	Jared Sprouse
2025	The Star I Lost	Luz Orlando Brennan
2024	The City	Amit Ulman
2023	These Days	Edward Gonzalez Jr.
2022	Pierre & Jeanne	Clementine Celarie
2021	The Parent	Vlad Furman
2020	Keeping the Bees	Eylem Kaftan
2019	Ticket	Yoh Komaya
2013	LICKS & Les Petits Princes	Jonathan Singer-Vine & Vianney Lebasque

=== Best Screenplay Award ===
Year	Film	Screenwriter
2021	The Parent	Andrey Shishov, Christina Kuzmina, & Vlad Furman
2020	Keeping the Bees	Eylem Kaftan
2019	Bilched	Hal Cumpston
2013	Halima's Path	Fedja Isovic

=== Best Actress Award ===
Year	Film	Actress
2026	Party USA	Ainsley Seiger
2025	The Star I Lost	Mirta Busnelli
2024	The City	Moira Akous
2023	Tree House	Cristiane Wersom
2022	Lost Cos	Evgeniya Radilova
2021	The Parent	Angelina Strechina
2020	Keeping the Bees	Meryem Uzerli
2019	Rag Doll	Shannon Murray
2015	Marry Me	Sirin Zahed
2013	Halima's Path	Alma Prica

=== Best Actor Award ===
Year	Film	Actor
2026	Party USA	Phillip Andre Botello
2025	The Death of My Youth	Timo Jacobs
2024	The Compatriots	Rafael Silva
2023	Don Q	Armand Assante
2022	Pierre & Jeanne	Loris Freeman
2021	The Parent	Vladislav Bulanov (Vlad Furman) & Mikhail Porechenkov
2020	A Case Blue	Stephen Schnetzer
2019	Last Koan	Schidor Rahaman
2013	LICKS	Stanley Doe Hunt

=== Best Supporting Actor Award ===
Year	Film	Actor(s)
2021	East of Middle West	Joris Jarsky
2020	Keeping the Bees	Hakan Karsak
2019	Bilched	Frederick Du Rietz
2013	LICKS	Devon Libran & Koran Streets

=== Best Supporting Actress Award ===
Year	Film	Supporting Actress
2021	The Parent	Maria Shukshina
2020	Donna Stronger Than Pretty	Brittany Molnar
2019	Rag Doll	Stephanie Erb
2013	Halima's Path	Olga Pakalovic
