= Rooster's Breakfast =

- Slovene: Petelinji zajtrk
- Directed by: Marko Naberšnik
- Written by: Marko Naberšnik
- Based on: Petelinji zajtrk by Feri Lainšček
- Produced by: Franci Zajc
- Starring: Vlado Novak; Dario Varga; Davor Janjić; Pia Zemljič
- Music by: Saša Lošić
- Distributed by: Ars Media
- Release date: 18 November 2007
- Running time: 125 min
- Country: Slovenia
- Language: Slovene

Rooster's Breakfast (Slovene: Petelinji zajtrk) is a Slovenian drama film released in 2007. An adaptation of the 1999 novel of the same name by Feri Lainšček, it became a box-office hit and won several awards.

== Plot ==
The film takes place in the Mura Valley, in the vicinity of Gornja Radgona. David Slavinec, nicknamed Đuro, has recently been laid off from his job. However, his former boss points him to a new job at the automechanic shop owned by his acquaintance Pišti Gajaš, which he gladly accepts. Gajaš is an experienced, but somewhat naive local car mechanic who frequently talks about the past times when, in his opinion, life was much better for the ordinary people. His friends frequently visit him to play cards and discuss the events happening around them.

Cveto Vuksanović - Lepec, the town's biggest thug and the owner of the local night club, frequently visits Gajaš to repair his Mercedes. Gajaš always repairs the car for him although Lepec always finds an excuse not to pay the bill immediately, preferring payments in various small favors to Gajaš and his friends. One day, Đuro meets Bronja, the wife of Lepec, who brings in her car for repair. On another occasion, she asks Đuro to drive her to Austria to get some pills for her friend. They soon start meeting each other. Later she tells Đuro that she and her husband have become estranged after the birth of their daughter and the pills were meant to cure her severe nervous breakdown. Đuro and Bronja start a passionate affair, which Gajaš discovers, but keeps hidden from Lepec, who nevertheless becomes suspicious when he finds a lighter that Đuro forgot in their bedroom.

In the meantime, Gajaš dreams about Severina, a well-known Croatian pop star, who is on tour in the town. When Lepec drives his car in for a repair again, Gajaš demands he pays the debts from the past. This time Lepec pays him some money and promises he will bring Severina to his place to have dinner with him. Later that evening, Severina joins Gajaš for dinner.

The next morning Gajaš joyfully tells Đuro that he had "rooster's breakfast" (i.e. morning sex) with Severina, but Đuro tells him that the girl he slept with wasn't the real Severina, but a lookalike prostitute. Soon Lepec appears and spots a necklace given to Đuro by Bronja, thus discovering their affair. After a quarrel with Lepec, Gajaš pulls out a gun and shoots Lepec before he can strike Đuro. Some time later, Đuro visits Gajaš in prison who orders him to take over his workshop and maintain it in such order as he did. He then settles there with Bronja and her daughter.

== Cast ==
- Vlado Novak - Pišti Gajaš
- Primož Bezjak - David Slavinec (Đuro)
- Pia Zemljič - Bronja Vuksanović
- Dario Varga - Cveto Vuksanović (Lepec)
- Janez Škof - Jure Cekuta
- Davor Janjić - Rajko Malačič (Roki)
- Miloš Battelino - Igor Pavlica
- Matija Rozman - Viktor Brodnik (Zobar)
- Bojan Emeršič - Radmilovič

== Production ==
Rooster's Breakfast is an adaptation of the 1999 novel of the same name by Feri Lainšček.

== Release and reception ==
The film was critically acclaimed and a box-office hit in Slovenia, becoming the third most successful movie in Slovenia, following Titanic and Troy, at the time.

== Awards ==
The film won five awards at the 10th Festival of Slovenian Film. It was also the Slovenian candidate for the Academy Award for Best Foreign Film nomination in 2009 (81st Academy Awards), but was not nominated.

- 2007 – Audience Choice Award for best film, 10th Slovenian Film Festival in Portorož
- 2007 – Award for best directing, 10th Slovenian Film Festival
- 2007 – Award for best screenplay, 10th Slovenian Film Festival
- 2007 - Stop Magazine Award for best actor/actress (Pia Zemljič), 10th Slovenian Film Festival
- 2007 – Viktor Award for special achievements – for successful distribution of the film
- 2009 – Golden Bird Award
- 2009 – Critics Award at the 4th Annual South East European Film Festival, Cinema Without Borders, Los Angeles for best feature film
