= List of Ruža vjetrova characters =

This article contains a list of fictional characters in Ruža vjetrova ('Wind fall'), a Croatian soap opera that aired on RTL Television.

== Current characters ==
=== Dragica Odak ===
Dragica Odak
- Ruža vjetrova character
- Portrayed by: Jasna Malec Utrobičić (2011–2013)
- Duration: 2011-present
- First appearance: Episode 5 September 1, 2011
- Last appearance: Episode 310; April 3, 2013
- Created by: Dinko Paleka
In-universe information
- Occupation: Housekeeper
- Spouse: ? Odak (deceased)
- Children: Stipe Odak; Nives Odak
- Grandchildren: Marko Odak (deceased); Jakov Odak; Petar Odak

Dragica Odak is a character played from episode 5 by actress Jasna Malec Utrobičić. Dragica is the mother of Stipe and Nives. A traditional woman devoted to her family and her land, which is the reason she didn't move to Split like her children, but instead chose to stay in Goračići, a fictional village in Dalmatinska Zagora.

=== Jakov Odak ===
Jakov Odak
- Ruža vjetrova character
- Portrayed by: Tomislav Čubelić (2011-present)
- Duration: 2011-present
- First appearance: Episode 1 August 29, 2011
- Created by: Dinko Paleka
In-universe information
- Occupation: Coffee bar owner
- Parents: Stipe Odak; Marica Odak
- Siblings: Marko Odak (deceased)
- Aunts and uncles: Nives Odak (aunt)
- Nieces and nephews: Petar Odak (cousin)

Jakov Odak is a character played from the show's debut on August 29, 2011 by actor Tomislav Čubelić. Jakov is the rebellious younger son of Stipe and Marica who falls in love with Sara Matošić.

=== Marica Odak ===
Marica Odak
- Ruža vjetrova character
- Portrayed by: Mirela Brekalo Popović (2011-present)
- Duration: 2011-present
- First appearance: Episode 1 August 29, 2011
- Created by: Dinko Paleka
In-universe information
- Occupation: Housekeeper
- Spouse: Stipe Odak
- Children: Marko Odak (deceased); Jakov Odak

Marica Odak is a character played from the show's debut on August 29, 2011 by actress Mirela Brekalo.

Marica is Stipe's wife. Although her family is rich, she chose not to have any servants in their home, but instead do all house chores on her own, due to her being a traditional woman from the Zagora.

=== Mila Visković ===
Mila Viskovic
- Ruža vjetrova character
- Portrayed by: Marija Omaljev-Grbić (2011-present)
- Duration: 2011-present
- First appearance: Episode 49; November 7, 2011
- Created by: Dinko Paleka
In-universe information
- Occupation: Lawyer

Mila Visković is a character played from episode 49 on by actress Marija Omaljev-Grbić. Mila is a state prosecutor who moves to Split and soon falls in love with Srđan, but later on, she falls in love with Petar and stays with him.

=== Nives Odak ===
Nives Odak
- Ruža vjetrova character
- Portrayed by: Nives Ivanković (2011-present)
- Duration: 2011-present
- First appearance: Episode 1 August 29, 2011
- Created by: Dinko Paleka
In-universe information
- Occupation: Businesswoman
- Parents: Dragica Odak ?
- Siblings: Stipe Odak (brother)
- Children: Petar Odak (with Franjo Mamić - rape)
- Grandchildren: Ante Odak (by Petar)

Nives Odak is a character played from the show's debut on August 29, 2011 by actress Nives Ivanković. She is described as a woman from the country with no manners, but due to her talents and competences in business, she, along her brother Stipe, has gotten very rich; although, she has preserved her rural woman's attitude and behavior. Originally built as an antagonist, she eventually became the series' breakout character.

=== Petar Odak ===
Petar Odak
- Ruža vjetrova character
- Portrayed by: Slavko Sobin (2012-present)
- Duration: 2012-present
- First appearance: Episode 153; April 27, 2012
- Created by: Dinko Paleka
In-universe information
- Parents: Nives Odak; Franjo Mamić
- Children: Ante Odak
- Aunts and uncles: Stipe Odak; Marica Odak
- First cousins: Marko Odak (deceased); Jakov Odak

Petar Odak is a character played from episode 153 onward by actor Slavko Sobin. Petar is Marko's childhood friend who went abroad, but returned to Split to discover who his real mother is. At first, he is a mysterious character, but through time, it is revealed that he is the son of Nives Odak and a man who raped her when she was 15, so he stays in Split and starts living with the Odak's.

Moreover, it is revealed that Ante is actually his son and not Marko's, as a product of him having an affair with Jelena before going abroad. At the end, he falls in love with Mila.

=== Sara Matošić ===
Sara Matošić
- Ruža vjetrova character
- Portrayed by: Petra Cicvarić (2011-present)
- Duration: 2011-present
- First appearance: Episode 1 August 29, 2011
- Created by: Dinko Paleka
In-universe information
- Occupation: College student
- Parents: Milivoj Matošić; Suzana Matošić
- Siblings: Srđan Matošić (brother)Ines Matošić-Odak (brother)

Sara Matošić is a character played from the show's debut on August 29, 2011 by actress Petra Cicvarić. Sara is the rebellious younger sister of Ines, who falls in love with Jakov.

=== Stipe Odak ===
Stipe Odak
- Ruža vjetrova character
- Portrayed by: Stojan Matavulj (2011-present)
- Duration: 2011-present
- First appearance: Episode 1 August 29, 2011
- Created by: Dinko Paleka
In-universe information
- Occupation: Businessman
- Parents: Dragica Odak ?
- Siblings: Nives Odak (sister)
- Spouse: Marica Odak
- Children: Marko Odak (deceased); Jakov Odak

Stipe Odak is a character played from the show's debut on August 29, 2011 by actor Stojan Matavulj. Stipe is Nives' brother, Marica's husband, and Marko and Jakov's father. He is a primitive rural man who enriches with his sister thanks to their talents for business during the 1990s. Originally built as an antagonist, he is later shown to have a good side and will do anything for his family.

=== Suzana Matošić ===
Suzana Matošić
- Ruža vjetrova character
- Portrayed by: Branka Pujić (2011-present)
- Duration: 2011-present
- First appearance: Episode 1 August 29, 2011
- Created by: Dinko Paleka
In-universe information
- Occupation: Lawyer
- Spouse: Milivoj Matošić (1984–2012)
- Children: Srđan Matošić; Ines Matošić-Odak; Sara Matošić

Suzana Matošić is a character played from the show's debut on August 29, 2011 by actress Branka Pujić.

Suzana Matošić is the mother of female protagonist of Ruža vjetrova, Ines Matošić-Odak. She is a woman with an expressed sense of fairness. During the last twenty years, she has been working as a lawyer. She believes that her clients are all innocent until proven otherwise, but she doesn't feel the same thing for Odak family. She instilled the same life principles to her oldest child, Srđan who is also a lawyer. He is the realization of all of her wishes, strong, decisive and a fair man. Suzana likes to have things under control which leads to constant conflicts with the free-spirited daughter Sara and her husband Milivoj. Despite her strength and resolve, she needs security and support within the family.

In the beginning of the show, Suzana was in court defending her client, a criminal Zhilich who was jailed for 3 years. He vowed revenge upon her and her family. She was worried when her daughter Ines went missing in the storm, but was relieved when she was saved. Although she sympathizes with Marko, she is not very fond of his father and his aunt. She and Nives often clashed during the wedding preparations.

She is aware of her husband's love affairs but doesn't want to end the marriage due to her traditional upbringing. She doesn't know that one of Milivoj's mistresses is Ana, her daughter's best friend. When Ines got kidnapped on the night of her wedding, Suzana blamed Stipe but later realized that maybe Zhilich, her former client was behind the whole thing.

== Former characters ==
=== Adrijana Jelavić ===
Adrijana Jelavić
- Ruža vjetrova character
- Portrayed by: Tamara Šoletić (2011–2012)
- Duration: 2011-2012
- First appearance: Episode 1 August 29, 2011
- Last appearance: Episode 176; May 29, 2012
- Created by: Dinko Paleka
In-universe information
- Occupation: Store owner
- Siblings: Mirjana (sister)
- Spouse: Edo Jelavić (deceased)
- Children: Toni Jelavić; Nika Jelavić

Adrijana Jelavić is character who was played from the show's debut on August 29, 2011 to May 29, 2012 by actress Tamara Šoletić. She is the head of Jelavići family, a housekeeper who struggles with the daily problems, which come from their lack of money and economical stability.

=== Ana Antolović ===
Ana Antolović-Matošić
- Ruža vjetrova character
- Portrayed by: Matea Elezović (2011–2012)
- Duration: 2011-2012
- First appearance: Episode 1 August 29, 2011
- Last appearance: Episode 135; April 3, 2012
- Created by: Dinko Paleka
In-universe information
- Occupation: Journalist
- Spouse: Srđan Matošić
- Children: ? (with Milivoj, deceased)

Ana Antolović is a character who was played from the show's debut on August 29, 2011 to April 3, 2012 by actress Matea Elezović. Ana was Ines' best friend and her brother Srđan's fiancee. She never had family, so she felt like Matošići were hers, which caused her having a strong relationship with many members of the family, including Milivoj Matošić, whom she had an affair with and got pregnant, but she chose to tell Srđan he is the father of his father's baby. Suzana finds out about this, confronts her in the street, and soon Ana falls victim to a van which hits her and kills both her and her unborn baby.

=== Edo Jelavić ===
Edo Jelavić
- Ruža vjetrova character
- Portrayed by: Juraj Aras (2011–2012)
- Duration: 2011-2012
- First appearance: Episode 1 August 29, 2011
- Last appearance: Episode 143; April 13, 2012
- Created by: Dinko Paleka
In-universe information
- Occupation: Store owner Fisherman; Construction worker
- Parents: Jure Jelavić; Anka Jelavić (deceased)
- Spouse: Adrijana Jelavić
- Children: Toni Jelavić; Nika Jelavić

Edo Jelavić is a character who was played from the show's debut on August 29, 2011 to April 13, 2012 by actor Juraj Aras. Edo was an easy-going husband of Adrijana who falls victim to Ivan Marušić's revenge on the Odak's who put bomb underneath their car, but in a curious play of destiny, Edo was driving their car that day and died in an exploding car.

=== Ines Matošić ===
Ines Matošić-Odak
- Ruža vjetrova character
- Portrayed by: Anja Alač (2011–2012)
- Duration: 2011-2012
- First appearance: Episode 1 August 29, 2011
- Last appearance: Episode 241; November 25, 2012
- Created by: Dinko Paleka
In-universe information
- Occupation: Interior designer
- Parents: Milivoj Matošić; Suzana Matošić
- Siblings: Sara Matošić (sister); Srđan Matošić (brother)
- Spouse: Marko Odak (2011–2012) (deceased)
- Children: Anđela Matošić (with Marko Odak)

Ines Matošić-Odak is a character who was played from the show's debut on August 29, 2011 by actress Anja Alač.

Ines Matošić-Odak was the cheerful, smiling and intelligent protagonist of Ruža vjetrova. From her father she inherited the serenity and from her mother her determination. She still naively believes in people's intentions. The family has always been very protecting and she didn't have a chance to see the "dark side" of human nature. From the moment her fate pushed her in Marko's arms, her life begins to change dramatically. She was forced to grow up when she entered the life of Odak family. Ines is a mediator between Suzana and Milivoj whose marriage is in danger due to Milivoj's numerous affairs. She completed the college of design and specialized in interior design. After completing high school, she had a longer relationship with Filip. Her best friend is Ana.

She met Marko Odak, the love of her life, during the storm while she was having trouble with her boat. He rescued her from drowning and they were stranded for a couple of days on a small island with a lighthouse on it. They were dating for a year and got engaged shortly before their first anniversary. Ines almost broke off the engagement when she found out that Marko could be involved in his father's corrupted businesses. Marko denied the accusations and the two got together again. Marko promised that his family won't interfere with his new life.

Ines and Marko were married on September 1 surrounded by their families and friends. The happiest day of their lives turned into a nightmare when Ines was kidnapped by abductors commanded by Stipe, Marko's father. She was almost raped by one of the abductors. The leader of the team killed the above-mentioned abductor and Ines was safe, for a while.

After a few days of desperation, Marko and Srđan, Ines's brother found out where the thugs were hiding Ines and decided to rescue her. Both armed, they broke in the little house where Ines was held and they manage to rescue her.

=== Luka Knežević ===
Luka Knežević
- Ruža vjetrova character
- Portrayed by: Jadran Grubišić (2011–2012)
- Duration: 2011-2012
- First appearance: Episode 1 August 29, 2011
- Last appearance: Episode 124; March 15, 2012
- Created by: Dinko Paleka
In-universe information
- Occupation: Bartender

Luka Knežević is a character who was played from the show's debut on August 29, 2011 to March 15, 2012 by actor Jadran Grubišić.

=== Marko Odak ===
Marko Odak
- Ruža vjetrova character
- Portrayed by: Matko Knešaurek (2011–2012)
- Duration: 2011-2012
- First appearance: Episode 1 August 29, 2011
- Last appearance: Episode 185; June 7, 2012
- Created by: Dinko Paleka
In-universe information
- Occupation: Businessman; Economist; Bar owner
- Parents: Stipe Odak; Marica Odak
- Siblings: Jakov Odak (brother)
- Spouse: Ines Matošić-Odak (2011–2012)
- Children: Currently expecting
- Grandparents: Dragica Odak (paternal grandmother)
- Aunts and uncles: Nives Odak (aunt)

Marko Odak is a character who was played from the show's debut on August 29, 2011 to June 7, 2012 by actor Matko Knešaurek.

Marko Odak is a good hearted protagonist of Ruža vjetrova, characterized as handsome, charming, and communicative, as well as principled, strong, and ready to protect those he loves at the expense of his own life. Stipe's successor, Marko is the pride of his father and his mother Marica. In his youth, his behavior was typical for an Odak man, but after puberty he realized the error of his conduct. He finished school and enrolled in the Faculty of Economics. Marko is a stable man who will sacrifice anything to fight for his love, even in situations when the battle seems lost.

He met Ines Matošić, the love of his life, during the storm while she was having trouble with her boat. He rescued her from drowning and they were stranded for a couple of days on a small island with a lighthouse on it. They were dating for a year and got engaged shortly before their first anniversary. Ines almost broke off the engagement when she found out that Marko could be involved in his father's corrupted businesses. Marko denied the accusations and the two got together again. Marko promised that his family won't interfere with his new life.

Ines and Marko were married on September 1 surrounded by their families and friends. The happiest day of his life turned into a tragic one when Ines was kidnapped by abductors commanded by Stipe, Marko's father. Marko didn't know that his father is behind the kidnapping of his wife.

After a few days of desperation, Marko and Srđan, Ines's brother found out where the thugs were hiding Ines and decided to rescue her. Both armed, they broke in the little house where Ines was held and manage to rescue her.

=== Milivoj Matošić ===
Milivoj Matošić
- Ruža vjetrova character
- Portrayed by: Frano Lasić (2011–2012)
- Duration: 2011-2012
- First appearance: Episode 1 August 29, 2011
- Last appearance: Episode 134; April 4, 2012
- Created by: Dinko Paleka
In-universe information
- Spouse: Suzana Matošić (1984–2012)
- Children: Srđan Matošić; Ines Matošić-Odak; Sara Matošić

Milivoj Matošić is a character who was played from the show's debut on August 29, 2011 by actor Frano Lasić.

Milivoj Matošić is the father of female protagonist of Ruža vjetrova, Ines Matošić-Odak. He is a trained architect who has neglected his profession. Milivoj is the typical extrovert, optimistic, charming and always manages to create a comfortable atmosphere. He is a charmer of the old school and he knows how to say the right thing at the right time. Milivoj lives for the pleasure, but also neglects the needs of his family.

In the beginning of the show, Milivoj was shown deeply upset over his daughter's disappearance. He approves the marriage between Marko and Ines, although he doesn't show the minimum of interest into paying the wedding.

Although he respects and loves his wife, he has occasional affairs with other women. Most recently he spent a romantic night with Ana, his daughter's best friend.

=== Nika Jelavić ===
Nika Jelavić
- Ruža vjetrova character
- Portrayed by: Petra Krolo (2011–2012)
- Duration: 2011-2012
- First appearance: Episode 1 August 29, 2011
- Last appearance: Episode 176; May 29, 2012
- Created by: Dinko Paleka
In-universe information
- Occupation: Primary school student
- Parents: Edo Jelavić (deceased); Adrijana Jelavić
- Siblings: Toni Jelavić
- Grandparents: Jure Jelavić
- Aunts and uncles: Mirjana (aunt)

Nika Jelavić is a character who was played from the show's debut on August 29, 2011 to May 29, 2012 by actress Petra Krolo.

=== Srđan Matošić ===
Srđan Matošić
- Ruža vjetrova character
- Portrayed by: Robert Kurbaša (2011–2012)
- Duration: 2011-2012
- First appearance: Episode 1 August 29, 2011
- Last appearance: Episode 185; June 7, 2012
- Created by: Dinko Paleka
In-universe information
- Occupation: Lawyer
- Parents: Milivoj Matošić; Suzana Matošić
- Siblings: Ines Matošić-Odak; Sara Matošić
- Spouse: Ana Antolović (2012) (deceased)

Srđan Matošić is a character who was played from the show's debut on August 29, 2011 by actor Robert Kurbaša.

Srđan Matošić is the brother of female protagonist of Ruža vjetrova, Ines Matošić-Odak. He is a lawyer, a pride and successful copy of his mother Suzana. Srđan is a real fighter for the ideals. He was a good student. His best friend is Filip, his sister's former boyfriend. Working in the County Attorney's office, he is surrounded by corruption and morally questionable characters. Despite everything, he remains firm. Although he is a successful lawyer, he failed in his private life. He never had much success with girls since childhood. Currently he is involved with Ana, the same girl his father had a one-night stand with. Milivoj and Srđan don't have a close relationship since they don't have much in common.

In the beginning of the show, Srđan was the opposing lawyer in the case against the criminal Zhilich, the same case his mother was working on. He was deeply preoccupied when his sister went missing in the sea during a storm. He did not interfer in his sister's relationship with Marko although he isn't Marko's biggest fan either. he intends to bring Marko's father Stipe to justice due to his illegal businesses.

When Ines got kidnapped, he did everything to find her. He received an anonymous call from one of the kidnappers and he found out where they were hiding his sister. With Marko's help, armed with guns he rescued his sister from the abductors.

=== Toni Jelavić ===
Toni Jelavić
- Ruža vjetrova character
- Portrayed by: Roko Sikavica (2011–2012)
- Duration: 2011-2012
- First appearance: Episode 1 August 29, 2011
- Last appearance: Episode 176; May 29, 2012
- Created by: Dinko Paleka
In-universe information
- Occupation: High school student
- Parents: Edo Jelavić (deceased); Adrijana Jelavić
- Siblings: Nika Jelavić
- Grandparents: Jure Jelavić
- Aunts and uncles: Mirjana (aunt)

Toni Jelavić is a character who was played from the show's debut on August 29, 2011 to May 29, 2012 by actor Roko Sikavica.
