= Let's CEE Film Festival =

Eastern European film festival held in Austria

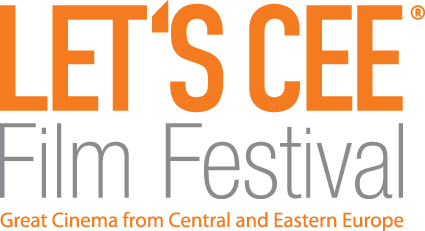

Let's CEE Film Festival was an eastern European film festival held annually in Vienna, Austria, from until 2018. "CEE" stands for Central and Eastern Europe. In 2023, the Let's CEE organisation became an organising partner the Eastern European Film Festival Network (EEFFN), which brings together five Western European film festivals showcasing Eastern European cinema. The EU Youth Cinema: Green Deal is managed by Let's CEE.

== History ==
Let's CEE was inaugurated in 2012 as a celebration of Central and Eastern European cinema in Vienna.

The second edition in September 2013, which had the motto "Look East for Great Films", featured Hungarian filmmaker István Szabó (who won an Oscar for his 1981 film Mephisto), Polish production designer Allan Starski, and Croatian producer Branko Lustig (producer of Schindler's List). Szabó's new film, The Door, starring Helen Mirren and Martina Gedeck, screened in competition, along with Romanian director's Adrian Sitaru's Domestic, Czech director David Ondricek's In the Shadow, and Polish director Malgoska Szumowska's In the Name Of. The festival included retrospectives of Slovenian director Damjan Kozole and Russian filmmaker Alexander Sokurov, and a screening of Sergei Eisenstein's 1925 silent film classic Battleship Potemkin, accompanied by a live soundtrack by the band Russkaya.The film program was accompanied by audience discussions, concerts, lectures, and a nighttime party zone at the Ost-Klub on Schwarzenbergplatz. The 2013 edition included competitions for feature, documentary, and short films. At this time, it was not funded by government at any level, but relied on private sponsors such as the cultural manager Robert Hofferer and the cinema partner Cineplexx.

In 2019 the seventh edition of Let's CEE, planned for May of that year, was cancelled, a move which led festival director Magdalena Zelasko to criticise the cultural department of the City of Vienna and the Federal Chancellery. The six editions of the festival had screened 610 films, had over 76,000 visitors, as well as more than 600 predominantly international festival guests.

== Description ==
Inaugural festival director Magdalena Zelasko, who is Polish, said in 2013 that the festival aimed to contribute to intercultural dialogue at both the domestic and international level. Films from Poland, Ukraine, Hungary, and the Czech Republic were rarely screened in Austrian cinemas, although German, French, and British productions were commonly seen.

Films are screened at the Urania and Actors cinemas in Vienna. Films are selected from a wide range of countries, including Azerbaijan, Belarus. Turkey, and the Caucasus region.

In the early days, funding was provided by private sponsors along with Cineplexx, but later there were many sponsors at various level, with the presenting partners being Creative Europe Media (an EU body), Cineplexx, and Nu Boyana Film Studios, a Bulgarian production company owned by the Hollywood-based Nu Image and Millennium Films. Main partners and funders were the Austrian Film Institute, Raffeisen Bank International, and Wien Kultur.

== Awards ==
=== Urania Awards ===
In the Urania awards, statuettes known as Urania are awarded to the winners of the following categories as of 2017:

- Feature film - Danny Lerner Award, honouring Israeli filmmaker Danny Lerner
- Documentary
- Best feature film debut
- Short film

The Urania statuette is a 36-centimetre (14 in) feminine-form figurine made of aluminium, designed by Tone Fink and cast by Art Foundry Loderer Art Foundry in Feldbach, who became co-sponsor of the figurines in 2017. Winner of the Danny Lerner Award also receives 5,000 euros in cash and around 50,000 euros worth of production services by Nu Boyana Film Studios, while the other awards are worth 1,500 euros in cash.

The "Star of the Urania" award was awarded annually to an extraordinary person for their lifetime achievement in the film industry. It was awarded to the following people:

- 2016: Not awarded
- 2017: Kira Muratova (Ukraine) and Márta Mészáros (Hungary)

=== Other awards ===
The Cineplexx Distribution Award was first awarded in 2017, giving 20,000 euros worth of distribution services, to assist with launching a successful cinema release with the largest cinema chain in Austria.

There were two Audience Awards, for best short film and feature-length film, worth 1,000 euros.

=== Winners ===
In 2014, the Urania for best feature film went to Estonian director Ilmar Raag's international co-production I Won't Come Back. Pipeline, by Ukrainian director Vitaly Mansky, won the top award in the Documentary category Urania for documentary films. Tatjana Božić's Happily Ever After and Latvian director's Viestur Kairish's Pelican in the Desert earned Honourable Mentions.

In 2018, the film Ivan, by Slovene director Janez Burger won the Danny Lerner Award for Best Feature, while When the War Comes by Czech director Jan Gebert won Best Documentary. The audience chose Georgian director's Mariam Khatchvani's Dede as best feature film, and Eliane Umuhire won the Best Performance award for her role in Birds Are Singing in Kigali. the Serbian science fiction film A.I. Rising directed by Lazar Bodroža won the Cineplexx Distribution Award.

== Eastern European Film Festival Network ==
In October 2023, the Eastern European Film Festival Network (EEFFN) was officially launched, the inaugural edition being planned for 2024. The initiative brings together five film festivals showcasing Eastern European cinema, as well as a partner organisation: GoEast Film Festival (Wiesbaden, Germany); BEAST International Film Festival (Porto, Portugal); Eastern Neighbours Film Festival (The Hague, Netherlands); A l'Est Film Festival (Rouen, France); CinEast Film Festival (Luxembourg); and the EU Youth Cinema: Green Deal, which is managed by the Let's CEE Film Festival association. An EEFFN Award is presented through each of the five festivals within the network.
