= Robert Hofferer =

Austrian film and theatre producer

- Born: Klagenfurt, Austria
- Occupation(s): Film and theatre producer

Robert Hofferer is an Austrian film and theatre producer. He was cultural manager and a sponsor of the Let's CEE Film Festival, a film festival focused on Central and Eastern European films, held in Vienna between 2012 and 2018. He is the founder and CEO of film production company Artdeluxe.

== Early life and education ==
Robert Hofferer was born in Austria.

He received earned a Master of Arts degree at the University of Vienna in 1985.

== Career ==
From 1985 to 1990 Hofferer worked as a journalist for TV, radio, and print publications, after which he worked as a producer of independent theatre until 1998.

From 2002 until 2015 he was the manager of Austrian artist, actor, and author André Heller, which included producing his show Afrika! Afrika!. From 2002, he was also a member of the German Government's cultural advisory body for the 2006 FIFA World Cup in Germany. He headed production for international projects for FIFA, Swarovski Crystal (including the Swarovski pavilion for the Shanghai World Expo in 2010).

From 2006 until 2012, he was also the manager of German actress and writer Asli Bayram.

As of 2013, Hofferer was cultural manager as well as a major sponsor of the second Let's CEE (Central and Eastern Europe) film festival. He was a founder of the Urania Award in the categories Best Feature Film and Best Documentary, as well as the Star of the Urania, a lifetime achievement award.

His 2023 documentary feature, Verity Circle (Kreis der Wahrheit), premiered at the K3 Film Festival in Villach, Austria, and was also selected for screening at the Miami Jewish Film Festival in Miami, United States. The film tells the story of two Viennese sisters, Helga and Elisabeth, daughters of a Jewish mother and Catholic father, who, after the Anschluss (annexation of Austria by Germany) in 1938, have to live stigmatised at home, wearing the Jewish star. They are then deported, with their mother, to Theresienstadt, while their father is first imprisoned in fascist Italy before being deported to Auschwitz.

== Artdeluxe ==
Hofferer founded a film production company, Artdeluxe, in 2006. As of 2025 he remains CEO of the company, which is located in Vienna.

== Filmography ==
- 2007: Shortcut to Hollywood
- 2009: Sevdah for Karim
- 2012: Body Complete (co-producer)
- 2014: V & Me (short; producer)
- 2014: The Woods Are Still Green (co-writer and producer; co-written and directed by Slovenian filmmaker Marko Naberšnik)
- 2016: The Final Barrier (writer & producer)
- 2017: Das Wiener Riesenrad. Wahrzeichen und Legende
- 2019: Gate to Heaven (associate producer)
- 2022: Angelus Novus Reloaded (short; director, writer & producer)
- 2023: Kreis der Wahrheit / Verity Circle (documentary; director, writer & producer)

== Theatre ==
- Anne Frank: The Diary of a Young Girl (2007–2009)
- Afrika! Afrika!, starring André Heller (2006–2010 and 2013–2014; producer)
