= Ratko Glavina =

Croatian actor

- Born: 1 December 1941 (age 83); Spalato, Kingdom of Italy
- Occupation: Actor
- Years active: 1955–present

Ratko Glavina (born 1 December 1941) is a Croatian actor.

== Filmography ==
=== Television roles ===
- "Ruža vjetrova" as Jure Jelavić (2011-2012)
- "Novo doba" (2002)
- "Nepokoreni grad" (1982)
- "Velo misto" (1981)
- "Naše malo misto" (1970)

=== Filmske uloge ===
- "Posljednja volja" as Bepo Štambuk (restaurant) (2001)
- "Katarina Druga" (1987)
- "Povratak" (1979)
- "Đovani" as Giovanni (1976)
- "Djevojka i hrast" (1955)
