= Shanghai Gypsy =

- Film poster
- Slovene: Šanghaj
- Directed by: Marko Nabersnik
- Starring: Visar Vishka; Aslı Bayram
- Music by: Saša Lošić
- Release date: 29 August 2012
- Running time: 124 minutes
- Country: Slovenia
- Languages: Romani; Slovene; Italian

Shanghai Gypsy (Slovene: Šanghaj) is a 2012 Slovenian drama film directed by Marko Nabersnik. It was premiered on the 36th Montreal World Film Festival and is considered one of the most expensive Slovenian films. Romani language is used for most dialogs in the film.

== Plot ==
The story revolves around Romani family Mirga and is narrated by Lutvija Belmondo Mirga, a gypsy king. The story begins with his grandfather Jorga who marries his grandmother Rajka, despite the fact she has already had many kids. They have a son named Ujaš who becomes Lutvija's father, but is ridiculed by other gypsies for not participating in the typical gypsy business. When even his wife starts accusing him for not being helpful enough he decides to leave his family to either succeed and return or disappear. After some time he returns as a wealthy man, making his wealth by smuggling various goods from Italy to Yugoslavia. He soon starts initiating Lutvija into the business and buys him a canvas print of Shanghai whose mightiness and splendor leaves Lutvija amazed.

During one of the trips to Italy Lutvija meets and falls in love with Amanda, a local call girl who reciprocates his feelings and decides to marry him. Lutvija, Amanda and the whole Mirga family then move to Prekmurje to conduct the business more easily. There, Lutvija acquires an empty piece of land and decides to establish a gypsy village, which he names Shanghai. Many Romani families soon settle in the village, thus getting the attention of the police and the local authorities. However, Lutvija soon establishes good relationship with both police and the local authorities, meaning the Mirga family can conduct its business without the problems. Lutvija even persuades a local politician to help them to get the electricity. Lutvija and Amanda get the son named Dono who later becomes a good student and starts showing a musical talent. However, this upsets Lutvija who wants Dono to continue his business which brings frequent quarrels with Amanda who support their son to follow his dreams.

After the death of Josip Broz Tito the situation starts to change rapidly. Due to the unstable situation, increasing tensions inside the country and less demand for the imported goods Lutvija begins to smuggle arms to various ethnic groups in Yugoslavia. A local journalist discovers the arms trade but Lutvija is forewarned and there is no consequences for him. However, the tensions with Amanda deepen and Lutvija finds himself at the crossroads, where he must choose between the family and happiness and his business. Lutvija also gets the attention of Dragan Kovačević, one of the most prominent arms dealer, who offers him a partnership, but Lutvija politely refuses, as he prefers working alone.

One night multiple explosions rock Shanghai, causing significant property damage, as well as loss of life of several villagers, including Ujaš. Suspecting revenge of Kovačević, Lutvija breaks down and confesses his illegal activities to the police which arrests him and he is sentenced to a three-year prison sentence. Without Lutvija as their leader, other villagers move out and Shanghai is demolished. During his sentence, Amanda tells Lutvija that Dono has left the school and moved to Maribor, accusing Lutvija of breaking of the family. After his release Lutvija decides to find Dono and bring him home, but is shocked when he discovers that Dono has become a homeless beggar and also a drug addict. He brings Dono home where he must endure severe withdrawal syndrome, but eventually recovers, returns to school and starts a normal life again.

== Cast ==
- Visar Vishka as Lutvija Belmondo Mirga
- Aslı Bayram as Amanda
- Senad Bašić as Ujas Mirga
- Marjuta Slamic as Phirav Pao
- Jasna Diklić as Baka Rajka
- Miodrag Trifunov as Deda Jorga
