= Ruža vjetrova =

- Created by: Dinko Paleka
- Starring: Anja Alač; Matko Knešaurek; Branka Pujić; Frano Lasić; Robert Kurbaša; Nives Ivanković
- Theme music composer: Ante Pecotić; Thomas Burić; Bojan Jambrošić
- Opening theme: Ruža vjetrova
- Country of origin: Croatia
- Original language: Croatian
- No. of episodes: 340

Production
- Running time: 45 minutes

Original release
- Network: RTL Televizija
- Release: 29 August 2011 – 23 May 2013

Ruža vjetrova (English: Wind Rose), often abbreviated to RV, is a Croatian television soap opera. The show was created by Dinko Paleka and first broadcast on RTL Televizija on 29 August 2011. Ruža vjetrova is an original idea made by Dinko Paleka, a project that he was working on for over 3 years. It is about the lives and loves of both young and older characters in Split. The focus is on the old-fashioned Matošić family, wealthy Odak family and the middle-class Jelavić family. The soap was renewed for a second season, which introduced new characters.

== Plot ==
The backbone of the series is a love story between two young people from different climes and quite different families. The girl is Ines Matošić, a young and energetic daughter of well-known and respected lawyer Suzana Matošić and the young man is Marko Odak, successor to his father's business empire, based on dubious contracts.

Much intrigue and inexplicable actions of parents when children are involved, collapse of love and deception, political and business shenanigans and the friendships that are born or are closed will enter the homes of viewers and tickle the imagination of all those who will be found in some of the characters.

The three main families, Matošić, Odak and Jelavić, are at first glance quite different and not compatible. However the series will certainly intertwine, and their life problems and incredible stories, through various situations will connect them with each other, argue them ecc.

Matošić family is the old town family who have for decades engaged in law and who live in a large apartment in the old part of Split. Once a warm home, now it is just a reminder of a past. Love and harmony rules their house for many times, but now coldness and distrust sneaked into the family.

Odak family originates from the Dalmatian hinterland, and enhance the construction work in the nineties, often in dubious ways. They are traditional, family people who stick together, but even in their family the mysteries and intrigues will cause a lot of trouble.

Jelavić family are ordinary people who work hard in order to earn an average, but still are living an easy life. Although they do not have much money, they have each other, regardless of the problems that arise within families, generally agree that most problems are dealt with at the end with a conversation and laughter, which often lack Matošić and Odak families.

== Storylines ==
=== Season 1 ===
At the beginning of the series, Marko and Ines are both shipwrecked and meet each other in the middle of the sea. They spend the night there and fall in love. Meanwhile, both of their families hear of the shipwreck and try to investigate. Suzana, Ines's mother, is in the middle of a case, prosecuting one of Stipe Odak's partners in his construction business for embezzling money. Meanwhile, the Odak family is meeting with Jakov to discuss the construction firm, and that his partner was placed in jail. Ines and Marko get married, and during their honeymoon, Ines is abducted. After the wedding, Milivoj meets Ana, a mistress and love interest, and they have unprotected sex. Sara meets Luka, and begins to date him. Marko and Srđan go to the abductor's location and free Ines, but the investigation is not over. Srđan noticed a man fleeing the scene. He tells everyone that that man is the perpetrator, and then all of Split begins to look for him. Srđan finds him, but falls into a trap. The man is holding a gun to his head. Srđan negotiates, and asks the man who organized the kidnapping. He does not give it up, and dies the next day.

The Matošić and Odak grandparents go on a camping trip together, where Nives begins to think that Milivoj likes younger women. She tells Suzana, who does not believe her. At the Jelavić house, Adrijana's sister moves in, finds a job, and then moves out after being kicked out by Adrijana. Then, in the weeks to follow, Srđan gets a new boss at his law firm, Mila. They meet frequently to discuss business, but Ana, Srđan's new girlfriend, thinks there is something going on between them. They are having dinner one day, then Ana calls Srđan and says she is pregnant. Srđan is happy, but then the dinner is interrupted by Ana who gets into a fight with Mila, who then leaves to go back to Zagreb. Ines sees Dr. Nikola for fertility treatments after she finds out that she can not have children, which was suggested by Marica, Marko's mother, after Marko and her tried for a child. Jelena, Marko's ex-girlfriend, visits him and Ines with her son Ante and tells Marko that he is the father. Ines and Marko take care of Ante while Jelena has to go back and work in Zagreb. A week later, Marica finds a recording device in Stipe's jacket that reveals that he organized the kidnapping. She tells Srđan, and he confronts Stipe.

Ines and Marko try for a child of their own, but are unsuccessful. Srđan meets Ana and they get into a serious relationship, and get married a couple of weeks later. At the wedding, Sara takes drugs, and is drunk. She is confronted by Suzana, but ignores her mother's warning. A couple of days later, when Luka and Sara were driving, Sara was drunk and they were having an argument. Sara crashed the car, and was sent to the hospital, where she is in a coma. She wakes up soon after, and is angry at Luka. The doctor says the next day that she needs blood or else she will be off of life support. Jakov Odak gives her blood, and she is thankful. Edo Jelavić takes out a loan to help the family's finances, but does not pay it back on time, so the loan sharks follow him and threaten his family. Adrijana pays them back, and makes Edo move into his own apartment. Nika hates this, and cries at school, which gets the social worker's attention. They become friends after, and try to get into a relationship, but cannot. After Milivoj and Suzana visit Sara at the hospital, they get into a huge fight, which leads Milivoj into a huge alcoholism and despair. Suzana begins seeing Ivan, but does not know that Nives Odak is seeing him as well. Ana finds out she is pregnant and tells Srđan and the Matošić family. They are ecstatic, but Milivoj thinks it may be his baby.

Milivoj tells Ana, and she secretly does a DNA test to find out the father. Meanwhile, Marko figures out that his father Stipe organized Ines's kidnapping, calls him on it, and punches him in the face. Then, he tells him he never wants to see him again. Ana gets the DNA result back, and it is Milivoj's. Then, the Matošić family gather for dinner that Srđan tells them Ana is going to have a son. Ana slips the DNA test into Milivoj's jacket as they leave, but Milivoj leaves his jacket there. Suzana reads the DNA test the next day, and is shocked. She yells at Milivoj, then surprises Ana as she goes grocery shopping. Edo gets a job at Jakov's construction firm, and the Odaks make a lot of money. Ana gets hit by a truck, and dies without Srđan there. Srđan falls into a despair, and so does the rest of the Matošić family. Suzana looks for Ivan's support, and is not interested in reconciling with Milivoj. Ines continues her fertility treatments, after Jelena comes back to Split and tells them that an agency moved her work to Zagreb, and she and Ante would be staying with Stipe and Marica Odak. Marko is devastated that he can not see his son anymore. The Odaks get a new car. After a dinner with Ivan and Nives, and a failed business deal, unknown people plant explosives in the car, which kill Edo Jelavić. Ivan is dating both Suzana and Nives at the same time. After Suzana rejects him, he proposes to Nives. She accepts, and asks Marica to be her maid of honour. Marica gladly accepts.

Ivan meets with Suzana, and he stands her up. Sara confronts him, and he meets Suzana again on the Split docks. She slaps him after he tells her he loves her, and they kiss. As Stipe and Nives are talking about that Stipe organized Ines' kidnapping, Jelena listens in and hears what they are saying. The next day, a suspicious Jakov confronts her and she says she still loves Marko. Nives and Stipe agree with the business deal, and transfer all their assets to Ivan's account. Jelena gets a job to distract everyone else, and says she will be moving out. The fertility treatments were successful, and Ines gets pregnant with a new baby. Jakov thinks she will try to break up their marriage. The Jelavić hears of Edo dying of explosives in the car, and they blame the Odaks. Toni yells at Adrijana, and then leaves the family house. He breaks into the Odak house, and smashes a vase to tell the Odaks that he will avenge his father. Jelena meets Ines and Marko for dinner, where she tells them that Stipe organized Ines's kidnapping, which Marko denies. Ines asks Marica about it the next day, which tells her it was true and Marko knew about it. They get into a heated argument, where in the middle, Ines's stomach hurts and thought she lost the baby. It turns out she just got her period. Ines then begins to be better friends with Dr. Nikola.

The next night, Ines returns her wedding ring to Marko. She tells her family that Stipe organized her kidnapping, and they are devastated. Ivan meets with Suzana before he leaves Split. He tells her he loves her. He transfers his assets to Suzana, who then owns the Odak house. When she is receiving the house, Nives goes and screams in the pool outside. The Odaks beg for the house back, then Stipe gets in a fight with the Matošićes. Srđan hears of it and buys a gun to protect his family. Suzana finds out from Mila and then confronts Srđan. He still keeps the gun. Ines comes back to Marko's apartment and they almost reconcile, but Jelena comes out of the bathroom half-naked. Ines leaves immediately. Suzana walks into her house at night and Nives holds a gun to her head. She tells her she will return the house. Stipe shoots Jakov for no reason and he is put in the hospital. Sara calls the police. When Marko tries to find Ines, he goes to Dr. Nikola's office, where they are in embrace. He fights with Nikola, then leaves.

Nives shows Suzana a film of her talking to Ana before she died, and Nives goes on the gossip column on the radio and tells about Milivoj being the father of Ana's unborn baby. Adrijana tells Ines to give Marko another chance. Ines goes to Marko's house, and they spend the night. After, they decide their marriage may not continue. Srđan stops at nothing to put Stipe in jail. He threatens Jakov with the gun–either he could be with Sara, or he could have the Odak house back. Sara hears of this, and is not happy. Jelena continues to create lies to tell Ante and Ines about Marko. Jelena goes on dinner with Nives and poisons her tea, which causes her to almost faint on the Split harbour. Petar comes to Split and becomes friends with Toni Jelavić.

Jakov chooses the house and Sara hears of it and returns her stuff. Toni Jelavić tries to place explosives in Stipe's car to avenge his father's death, but fails and it explodes on his face. Adrijana tries to get him to go to Italy to get the surgery on his face done. Marica and Suzana discuss the war between the families and try to work out a solution. Ines and Marko go on a trip to try to get their love back, but both have questions–Ines doesn't want her new child to be raised around the Odaks, but Marko loves her. Jelena puts a double dose of poison in Nives's tea, but when Ante visits Nives, they play and Nives switches the tea with Ante's. Ante faints and Dr. Nikola saves him at the hospital. Jakov proposes to Sara to stop their arguing, and she agrees. Mila and Srđan set up a sting operation to try and catch Stipe trafficking drugs. Tončić, a convict, agrees to help them, but turns to Stipe's side and gives them away. He pretends to agree to the deal, and Stipe gives him the drugs, which Tončić hides in Srđan's drawer at work. which he Suzana takes the news well but Stipe does not. Nives accuses Jelena of poisoning and tells Marko, who battles for Ante's custody to move to America. Jelena goes to lunch with Marko on a mountain to discuss the custody agreement, where she poisons him with snake venom. He lies unconscious and calls Ines, fainting. She gets there as soon as she can and tries to revive him. Toncic tells the police that Srdan had been drug trafficking, they check his drawer, and he is arrested. Petar reconciles with Nives, his long-lost mother. Marko dies from the snake bite and Ines gets his inheritance.

=== Season 2 ===
The backbone of the second season of the love story and the fate of two young people who will secrets of the past, evil people and a great temptation to stand on the path to true happiness. The girl is Marija Mrčela heroin fakes her own death to escape the abusive husband, a young man Šimun Bartulović, rural man, simple and strong character. The new season starts with Marija's escape from a violent husband, Ranko. Ranko after jumping from the yacht, the current is carried away to an unknown beach where he finds and rescues Šimun. Their encounter remains deeply etched in their minds and hearts.

In the first few episodes, Marija moves to Split and hides in the Odak house to help Stipe after he falls ill. Ranko finds out from Simun that she is in Split, and buys a condo there, trying to find her. The Matosic family visits Mila on her farm in Lika for dinner, with Ines carrying her and Marko's baby. At the end of the night, Mila and Suzana talk about Srđan, who sent a letter to them from jail. Then they talk about Ivan Marušić, which Suzana complains about. A day later, Suzana bathes nude in a lake close to the farm with Krsto, Šimun's father, watching her. Later, Simun gets instructions from Tamara, Ranko's lawyer, to find Marija. She gives him a photo of her. Marija begins to worry because Stipe Odak is getting better and that he won't need her help anymore.

Jakov and Petar fight for Nives' attention, and get into a fistfight. Jelena gets mad at Ines about her giving some of Marko's inheritance to Ante and reveals to Petar that Marko isn't Ante's father. Marija wants to move out of the Odak house and find work after Stipe gets better. Ranko sets up an ad in the paper for a nurse needed, which he is targeting Marija with. She finds this and he answers the phone, and Marija is shocked and moves back into the Odak house. Ranko then enlists Mila's help to find Marija.

== Cast ==
=== Current cast members ===
Actor	Character	Duration
Nives Ivanković	Nives Odak	2011–2013
Stojan Matavulj	Stipe Odak	2011–2013
Mirela Brekalo	Marica Odak	2011–2013
Branka Pujić	Suzana Matošić	2011–2013
Petra Cicvarić	Sara Matošić	2011–2013
Tomislav Čubelić	Jakov Odak	2011–2013
Marija Omaljev-Grbić	Mila Visković	2011–2013
Karmen Sunčana Lovrić	Jelena Čulo †	2012–2013
Slavko Sobin	Petar Vranković	2012–2013
Miraj Grbić	Ranko Mrčela †	2012–2013
Žarko Radić	Krsto Bartulović	2012–2013
Dolores Lambaša	Tamara Marin	2012–2013
Zoran Pajić	Šimun Bartulović	2012–2013
Marina Fernandez	Marija Mrčela	2012–2013

=== Recurring cast members ===
Actor	Character	Duration
Jasna Malec Utrobičić	Dragica Odak	2011–2013
Roko Glavina	Ante Odak	2012–2013
Hrvoje Krolo	Eugen	2012–2013
Josip Braovac	Damir	2012–2013

=== Former cast members ===
Actor	Character	Duration
Jadran Grubišić	Luka Knežević	2011–2012
Matea Elezović	Ana Antolović †	2011–2012
Frano Lasić	Milivoj Matošić	2011–2012
Šiško Horvat Majcan	Zvone	2011–2012
Juraj Aras	Edo Jelavić †	2011–2012
Matko Knešaurek	Marko Odak †	2011–2012
Robert Kurbaša	Srđan Matošić	2011–2012
Anja Alač	Ines Matošić	2011–2012
Stjepan Perić	Dr. Nikola Krizman	2012
Roko Sikavica	Toni Jelavić	2011–2012
Sascha Star	Diler	2011-2013
Petra Krolo	Nika Jelavić	2011–2012
Ratko Glavina	Jure Jelavić	2011–2012

== Production ==
A television studio of 900 square meters was built to record Wind Rose. The studio has 13 sets, four sets of external and nine sets in the studio. The team counts 80 members, the main cast does 21 people, a day pass through the production of at least 130 people. The originator of the idea was Wind Rose's producer Dinko Paleka, who on this project for three years. Besides him, the story elaborates John Delas and Tomislav Štefanac under the supervision of Garth Brooks.

== Reception ==
The first two episodes were recorded viewership of 7.9% (330,000 viewers), which entered the series in the top 10 most watched show that day. On 2012 Valentine's Day series was recorded viewership of 10.7%, a few days later it was announced that the Ruža vjetrova during February was the most watched in Dalmatia, where it follows the 27.5% average viewer. The new list is attached to TV in April 2012, announcing that soap opera attracts around 410,000 spectators, which is 9.8 percent of the total population.

== Broadcasters ==
Country	Alternate title/Translation	TV network(s)	Series premiere	Series finale	Weekly schedule
Croatia	Ruža vjetrova	RTL Televizija	29 August 2011	23 May 2013	Monday to Friday at 8:05 pm
Montenegro	Ruža vjetrova	TV Vijesti	12 September 2011	—	Monday to Friday at 5:00 pm
Bosnia and Herzegovina	Ruža vjetrova	Televizija OBN; RTV BN	16 April 2012	—	Monday to Friday at 8:00 pm
Macedonia	Роза на ветрот	Sitel TV	21 June 2013	Sitel Tv airing stopped the show for an unknown reason	Monday to Friday at 10:10 pm
Serbia	Ружа вјетрова	TBA			
