= Robert Kurbaša =

Croatian actor

- Born: 13 October 1977 (age 49); Split, SR Croatia, SFR Yugoslavia
- Occupation: Actor
- Years active: 2000–present

Robert Kurbaša (born 13 October 1977) is a Croatian actor.

== Filmography ==
=== Television roles ===
- Ruža vjetrova as Srđan Matošić (2011-2012)
- Pod sretnom zvijezdom as Vedran Gallo (2011)
- Dnevnik plavuše as Toni (2010-2011)
- Dolina sunca as Andrija Bukovac (2009-2010)
- Ponos Ratkajevih as Cvijo (2008)
- Ne daj se, Nina as David Glowatzky (2007-2008)
- Urota as Tomislav Vojković (2007)
- Obični ljudi as Robert Knežević (2006-2007)
- Ljubav u zaleđu as Duje Kaliterna (2005-2006)
- Naša kućica, naša slobodica as Mislav (1999)

=== Movie roles ===
- The Last Roman God as Paulanius (2026)
- 7 seX 7 as Kazimir (2011)
- Ljubavni život domobrana as Gogo (2009)
- Najveća pogreška Alberta Einsteina as Marko (2006)
- The Miroslav Holding Co. as student #3 (2001)
