= With Mum =

2013 film

- Film poster
- Directed by: Faruk Lončarević
- Written by: Faruk Lončarević
- Starring: Marija Pikić; Mira Furlan; Branko Đurić; Sanja Vejnović; Igor Skvarica; Edina Kordić
- Release date: 21 August 2013
- Running time: 80 minutes
- Countries: Bosnia and Herzegovina
- Language: Bosnian

With Mum (Bosnian: Sa mamom) is a 2013 Bosnian drama film directed by Faruk Lončarevič. It was selected as the Bosnian entry for the Best Foreign Language Film at the 87th Academy Awards, but was not nominated.

== Cast ==
- Marija Pikić as Berina
- Mira Furlan as Jasna
- Branko Đurić as Mladen
- Sanja Vejnović as Kaca
- Igor Skvarica as Tarik
- Edina Kordić as Luna
- Mirela Lambić as a Colleague from work
- Nina Đogo as a Nurse
- Faketa Salihebgović as a Worker at a counter

== See also ==
- List of submissions to the 87th Academy Awards for Best Foreign Language Film
- List of Bosnian submissions for the Academy Award for Best Foreign Language Film
