= Jure Ivanušič =

Slovenian actor and musician

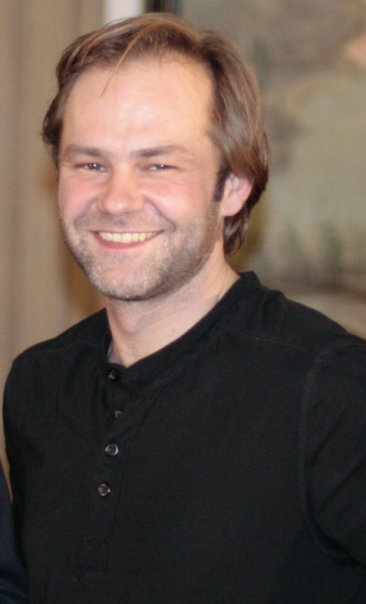
- Born: March 24, 1973 (age 52); Maribor, Socialist Republic of Slovenia, Yugoslavia (now Slovenia)

Jure Ivanušič (born 24 March 1973 in Maribor) is a Slovene theatre and film actor, director, playwright, concert pianist, composer, chansonnier and translator.

He studied drama at the Ljubljana Academy of Theatre, Radio, Film and Television and piano at the Universität für Musik und darstellende Kunst Graz. On many Slovene theatre stages, he has created several character roles (Pentheus in Euripides' Bacchae, Jerry in Albee's Zoo Story, Lorenzo di Spadaro in Andreyev's Black Masks, Mozart in Amadeus and Brindsley Miller in Shaffer's Black Comedy, Blue Morphan in Shepard's Unseen Hand, Axel in Strindberg's Playing with Fire etc.) for which he received the highest awards and recognitions both at home and abroad. The play "Stoned Cabaret", which he wrote with the physicist Peter Žiger, directed and contributed the musical part for it, was, according to professional critics, considered the best performance of the Maribor Slovene National Theatre season 1997/98. He directed the hit "Tomorrow I'll start" by writer Desa Muck. With her, he also wrote the comedy thriller "Christmas Eve" that was premiered at the Koper Theatre in 2008. In 2001, he directed the first Slovene staging of "The Vagina Monologues" by Eve Ensler. He also maintains a successful collaboration with the Croatian Ulysses Theatre on Brioni Islands.

Ivanušič has acted in many Slovene films (Outsider, Felix and others) and created leading roles in feature films "Transition" by Boris Palčič, which received the audience award at the Portorož Film Festival 2008, and in "On Earth as It Is in Heaven", the last film of the late Franci Slak. His screenplay for the feature film "Rabid Foxes" is currently in pre-production. The theatrical performance "From Silence to Music" (which played over 300 performances), the "Prešeren Cabaret" and the screenplay for the television feature "Who Wants to Be a Mozart" (in which Ivanušič played ten roles and received the Creative Gong Award by Vikend magazine) were created in collaboration with co-screenwriter Marko Vezovišek. He also played in several Slovene TV series and hosted TV broadcasts and shows (Impromptu, Slovenian Pop Songs 2002 and 2008, the State Ceremony to mark Slovenia's 2004 accession to NATO, Slovenian Dialect Music Festival 2001–2003, UNICEF, St Nicholas Charity Concert, Film Music Concert etc.). On Radio Slovenija he led, together with RTV Big Band, the show "Playing with the Stars" hosting actors who sing. The show also had a television version.

As a concert pianist he has performed works by Franz Liszt, Frédéric Chopin as well as Mozart's Concerts for Piano and Orchestra K. 414, K. 449, K. 453 and K. 488 with the Maribor Philharmonic Orchestra and played at concerts of the Maribor Music Artists Society. With Vanessa Redgrave, he performed at UNICEF concerts in London, Syracuse and Warsaw. Since 1992, he has been giving concerts with Rade Šerbedžija around Europe and the world. He also wrote the 'recession opera' "Eustachio and Catherine" as well as the incidental music for the play "Black Masks" for the opening of the Summer Festival of the Littoral in Koper in 2000.

Authorial songs from the music and theatre project "I Was Close to You" were later published on the album "Jure Ivanušič & Gusarji: Ob desetih zvečer" (ZKP, RTV 1999). Ivanušič has repeated his prizewinning success at the Festival of the Chanson (2001, 2005) and of the Slovenian Pop Songs festival (2003). The performance for actor and band entitled "The Heart in a Suitcase" was premiered in 2011 and issued on the CD "Jure Ivanušič & Nordunk: Srce v kovčku" (Celinka CEL CD 027); it includes authorial translations of the Belgian-French chansonnier Jacques Brel.

In 2012 he staged a "Cabaret for foreign tourists", for which he wrote the text and songs.

His new album of his songs with The RTV Slovenia Symphony Orchestra is currently in post-production.
