= Davor Janjić =

Bosnian actor (1969–2022)

- Born: 18 November 1969; Tuzla, SR Bosnia and Herzegovina, SFR Yugoslavia
- Died: 28 November 2022 (aged 53); Belgrade, Serbia
- Occupation: Actor
- Years active: 1987–2022

Davor Janjić (18 November 1969 – 28 November 2022) was a Bosnian actor. He appeared in more than thirty films since 1987.

Janjić died on 28 November 2022, at the age of 53.

== Selected filmography ==
Year	Title	Role	Notes
2007	Rooster's Breakfast		
2004	Life Is a Miracle		
2001	Natasha		
2000	Milky Way		
1997	Welcome to Sarajevo		
1997	Outsider		
1991	Čaruga		
1988	My Uncle's Legacy		
1987	A Little Bit of Soul		
