= Konak kod Hilmije =

Bosnian television sitcom (2018–2019)

- Created by: Feđa Isović
- Written by: Feđa Isović
- Directed by: Elmir Jukić
- Starring: Emir Hadžihafizbegović; Tarik Filipović; Igor Skvarica; Darko Tomović; Almir Kurt; Marko Cindrić; Milena Vasić
- Theme music composer: Nedim Babović
- Opening theme: Nedim Babović
- Country of origin: Bosnia and Herzegovina
- No. of seasons: 2
- No. of episodes: 24

Production
- Producer: Davor Pušić
- Production locations: Sarajevo, Bosnia and Herzegovina
- Running time: 30–35 minutes

Original release
- Network: Nova BH, Nova S, Nova TV
- Release: 7 May 2018 – 2 January 2019

Konak kod Hilmije (Bosnian for 'Hilmija's Inn') is a Bosnian television sitcom created and written by Feđa Isović and directed by Elmir Jukić.

The first episode of the show was aired on 7 May 2018. The so far final, 24th episode of the sitcom was aired on 2 January 2019. It has also been shown in Croatia and Serbia.

== Plot ==
The plot of the series is located in occupied Sarajevo during World War II in Yugoslavia. Everyone comes to Hilmija's Inn. From Partisan illegals from the woods, through Chetniks, Ustashas, soldiers of the SS "Handschar", all the way to German soldiers and the commander of the town of Sturmbannführer Schiling. Everybody makes conspiracies and problems in which national tensions became less important than personal material interest.

The plot gets additionally spiced up by two miners, Partisan illegals hidden in the basement, who have been given the task by Josip Broz Tito of digging a tunnel to the German weapons warehouse.

== Episodes ==
24 episodes were filmed, with the last episode airing on 2 January 2019.

=== Season 1 (2018) ===
No. overall	No. in season	Title	Original release date
1	1	"Die Ankunft des Sturmbannführer (Dolazak Štumbafirera)"	7 May 2018
2	2	"Graben des Tunnels (Kopanje tunela)"	14 May 2018
3	3	"Die Ankunft des Königs (Dolazak kralja)"	21 May 2018
4	4	"Wo ist der Keller? (Gdje je podrum?)"	28 May 2018
5	5	"Ich glaube wir haben Schwule in diesem Hotel (Mislim da imamo pedera u ovom hotelu)"	4 June 2018
6	6	"Die Läufe müssen vor dem Kampf geölt werden"	11 June 2018
7	7	"Kampf um den Deutschen (Borba za Nijemca)"	18 June 2018
8	8	"Fortgeschrittene Technik aus Kroatien (Napredna tehnika iz Hrvatske)"	25 June 2018
9	9	"Jemand ist schuldig, deshalb muss jemand erschossen werden (Neko je kriv, stoga neko mora biti streljan)"	2 July 2018
10	10	"Des Führers Geburtstagfeier (Führerov rođendan)"	9 July 2018

=== Season 2 (2018–2019) ===
No. overall	No. in season	Title	Original release date
11	1	"Suche nach Haggada aus Sarajevo (Potraga za Hagadom iz Sarajeva)"	3 October 2018
12	2	"Heinrich Himmlers Ankunft (Dolazak Heinricha Himmlera)"	10 October 2018
13	3	"Ohne Kultur gibt es keine Revolution (Bez kulture nema revolucije)"	17 October 2018
14	4	"Ein nasser Fetzen ist das beste Mittel gegen die Kopfschmerzen (Mokra krpa je najbolji lijek protiv glavobolje)"	24 October 2018
15	5	"Der Tunnel ist endlich fertig. Aber... (Tunel je konačno gotov.Ali...)"	31 October 2018
16	6	"Grosser Immobilienabverkauf"	7 November 2018
17	7	"Auf der Suche nach dem heiligen Buch – Teil 2 (Potraga za svetom knjigom-Drugi dio)"	14 November 2018
18	8	"Der Prinz hat sich in die Hosen gemacht (Princ se ukakao u gaće)"	21 November 2018
19	9	"Deutsche Medizin um mit dem Rauchen aufzuhören (Njemački lijek za prestanak pušenja)"	28 November 2018
20	10	"Deutsche Offensive am bosnischen Fluss (Njemačka ofanziva na bosanskoj rijeci)"	5 December 2018
21	11	"Domino Turnier und Reizwasche"	12 December 2018
22	12	"Die Ankunft des Kommissares fur homosexuelle Angelegenheiten (Dolazak Komesara za Homoseksualne Aktivnosti)"	19 December 2018
23	13	"Ankunft der amerikanischen Delegation (Dolazak Američke delegacije)"	26 December 2018
24	14	"Zwei Sekretarinen von SKOJ (Dvije SKOJevke)"	2 January 2019

== Cast ==
=== Main cast ===
- Emir Hadžihafizbegović as Hilmija Frlj, a Bosnian Muslim innkeeper who, in order to survive the war, pretends to collaborate with the occupier while secretly aiding the Partisan resistance movement.
- Tarik Filipović as Sturmbannführer Schiling, a naïve German major in charge of Sarajevo. Schiling is secretly gay and terrified of being sent to the Eastern Front.
- Igor Skvarica as Durmiš, a Romani waiter working at Hilmija's inn. Hilmija presents him to Schiling as a Slovene named Janez (later Borut) Prešern, to save him from getting executed.
- Darko Tomović as Božo Božović Portugalac, a Montenegrin Partisan working as a link between Hilmija's inn and the Partisan groups in the forests around Sarajevo. He got his codename after accidentally taking a stop in Portugal while traveling to Spain.
- Almir Kurt as Mustafa Zulfepuštampašić, a Bosnian Muslim quisling working as a chief of Sarajevan police hand in hand with Schilling, who's constantly annoyed with him.
- Marko Cindrić as Krešimir, a Croatian Ustasha soldier who works as a petty criminal.
- Milena Vasić as Rahaela Kohen, a Jewish woman that Hilmija hides in his inn. Hilmija, who is in love with her, presents her as a cook preparing sudžuka for Schiling's breakfasts, under the name of "Ana Vucibatina" in Season 1, then "Darija Hrvatić" in Season 2.
- Ilir Tafa as Agim Rugoba, a Kosovo Albanian working for Chetniks, a Serbian royalist movement. Rugoba uses his Albanian identity as a cover, since nobody would presume that an Albanian is working for Serbs due to their centuries-long tensions. Throughout the series, he has shown particular fondness towards working for the Serbian crown prince.
- Mirjana Jagodić-Marinković as Baba Zorka, an old woman working in the kitchen of Hilmija's inn.
- Adnan Omerović as Krhki, a Partisan with impaired hearing digging a tunnel from the basement of Hilmija's inn to the German weapons warehouse.
- Miodrag "Miki" Trifunov as Frljoka, a Partisan with impaired vision digging the tunnel.
- Bojan Perić as Vladimir Perić Valter, a Serb Partisan in charge of recruiting new people for the Partisan movement.

=== Other ===
- Tarik Džinić as young Izet Fazlinović, Hilmija's nephew who works as Schiling's assistant before being recruited to Partisans by a Serb woman Ranka whom he falls in love with and goes on to marry later in his life. Izet is the main protagonist of Lud, zbunjen, normalan, of which Konak kod Hilmije is a spin-off.
- Marko Gvero as Radovan Lepinja, a Chetnik and a drunkard, who's hiding at the Inn until it's safe for him to leave. He has known Hilmija since they came in contact during the World War I, when they were in their respective armies. It happened that Hilmija fell on the ground and broke his ankle, just as Radovan was about to shoot him, but since his weapon was out of ammunition, he chose to carry Hilmija to the infirmary instead.
- Marija Pikić as Azra Frlj, Hilmija's daughter and a fierce anti-fascist. Although being sent for Law studies to Zagreb by Hilmija, she secretly joins the Partisans and hides in the forests around the city.
- Dino Sarija as Ivica Naguzić, a Herzegovinian Croat of flamboyant nature, pretending to be born in Zagreb, when in reality, he is actually from Ljubuški. He is Sturmbannführer Schiling's secret boyfriend, later having revealed to have been promoted to head of the Croatian branch of Gestapo, so that no one suspects him of being a homosexual man.
- Emir Kapetanović as Vaso Miskin Crni, a Partisan tasked to seduce Schiling to obtain his city defense plan.
- Jana Stojanovska as Davorjanka Paunović Zdenka, Josip Broz Tito's mistress.
