= Ilir Tafa =

Kosovan actor

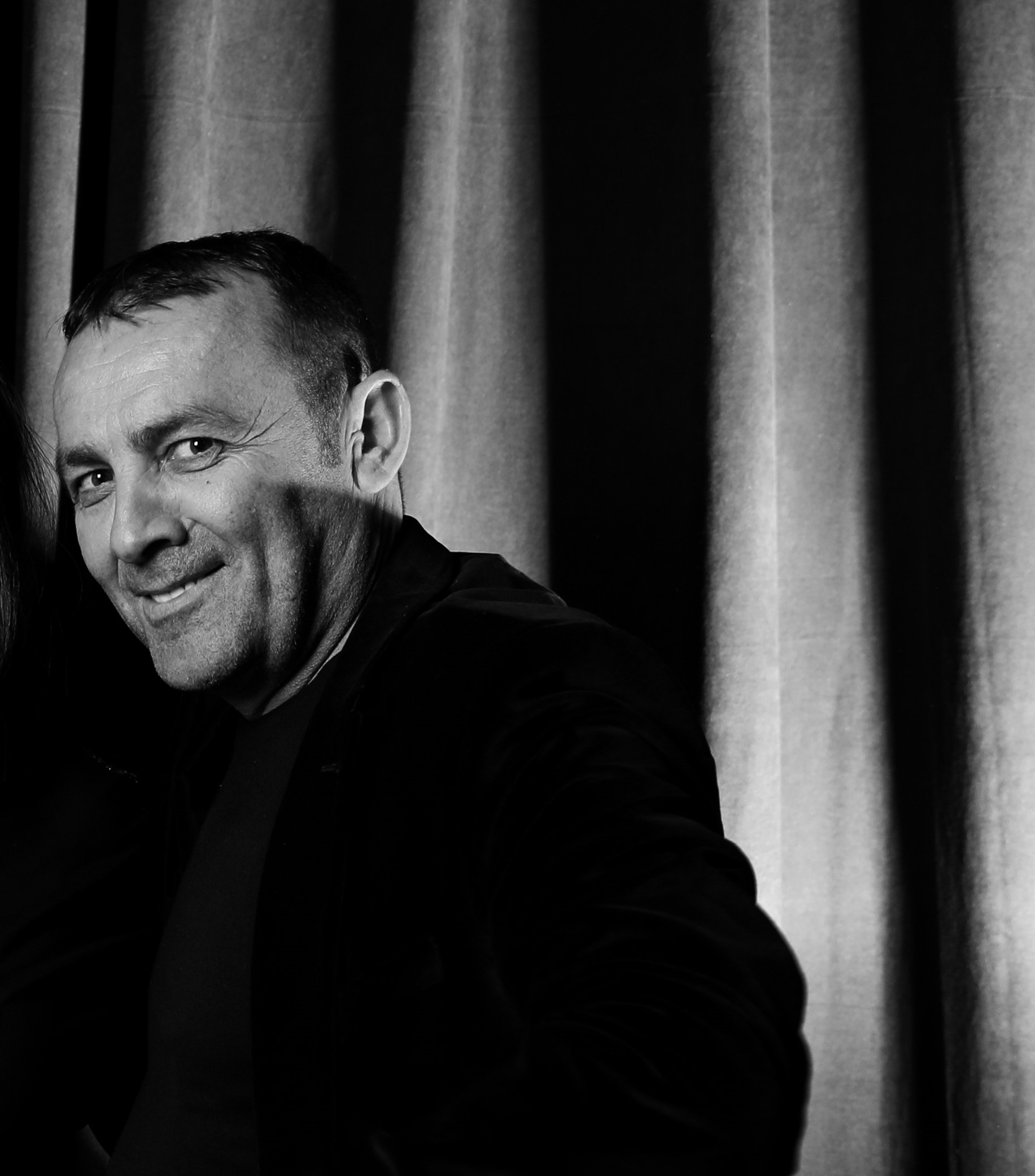
- Born: 6 May 1974 (age 51); Lipjan, Kosovo
- Occupation: Actor
- Years active: 1990s – present
- Notable work: Lud, zbunjen, normalan, Konak kod Hilmije, Tre Vllaznit

Ilir Tafa (born 1974 in Lipjan, Kosovo) is a Kosovar actor and lecturer. He has worked in theater, film, and television in Kosovo and the Balkan region. He is best known for his role as Mentor Kosova in the Bosnian sitcom Lud, Zbunjen, Normalan.Ilir Tafa served as the Chairman of the Steering Council of AAB College from its establishment until 2025.

== Early life and education ==
Ilir Tafa was born in 1974 in Lipjan. He studied acting at the Faculty of Arts of the University of Prishtina from 1995 to 1998, and later completed postgraduate studies, earning a Master’s degree in Acting in 2008.

== Theatrical career ==
Tafa’s artistic activity began on the Kosovar theater stage. Early in his career, he performed in the plays Alo 038 (1995) and Studio 2 (1995). An early achievement was the monodrama Sonte jam vetëm (2009).

In 2012, he played the leading role in the comedy Killing Me Softly at the Dodona Theater, while in 2018 he appeared in the dramedy Bretkosa at the “Faruk Begolli” Theater of AAB College, directed by Burbuqe Berisha.

According to critics, Bretkosa combines comic and tragic elements to depict the psychological and social difficulties of the post-war period and the challenges of communication within society.

== Film and television career ==
In the 1995s and 2000s, Tafa appeared in the Kosovar films Atje ku nuk lind dielli (1996) and Shtëpia e tmerrit (2000), as well as in the television series Kamera me yjet (2001), Kandidati për president (2002), Kaçurrelët (2007), and Zogjtë e luftës (2008).

From 2010 to 2016, he gained regional recognition for his role as Mentor Kosova in the Bosnian sitcom Lud, Zbunjen, Normalan. The role allowed him to speak Albanian on screen and to introduce elements of Kosovar culture, contributing to his popularity in Bosnia and Herzegovina, Croatia, and Serbia.

In 2016, Tafa played a leading role in the film Terorista, shot in Sarajevo and Budapest, alongside Bosnian actress Vanesa Glodjo.

In 2017, he participated in the Sarajevo Film Festival with two projects: Invisible and Žaba (Bretkosa). He also appeared in the film The Life of Flowers (2016), playing the role of Nick, and in the Kosovar film Kodi i jetës (2012) as Cile.

In 2018, he joined the historical-comedy series Konak kod Hilmije, portraying the character Agim Rugoba.

In 2022, Tafa played the role of Bajram Bytyqi in the Kosovar television series Tre Vllaznit.

== International contribution and cultural diplomacy ==
According to a 2022 academic analysis titled Cultural Diplomacy of Kosovo after the Declaration of Independence, Kosovo faced significant challenges in promoting its international identity due to limited official diplomatic channels.

The study cites Ilir Tafa as an example of cultural diplomacy through his role as Mentor Kosova in the television series Lud, Zbunjen, Normalan: his character spoke Albanian, presented Kosovar music, and addressed topics related to social tolerance. Through the broadcast of the series in Bosnia and Herzegovina, Croatia, Serbia, North Macedonia, and Montenegro, Tafa contributed to enabling Kosovo to communicate with audiences in countries with which it had no official relations.

== Awards and recognition ==
Ilir Tafa has been honored with several awards for his performances, including:

- "Best Actor" at the Kosovo Film Festival, Gjilan (2002)
- "Best Actor" at the Albanian Comedy Festival, Preševo (2009)
- "Best Actor" at the Balkan Theater Festival, Pristina (2010)
- "Best Actor" at the Albanian Theater Festival, Dibra, North Macedonia (2010)

== Filmography ==
=== Theatre ===
Year	Title	Role	Production / Country
1995	Alo 038	Agron	Akademia e Arteve, Prishtinë
1995	Studio 2	Gjemshiti	Teatri Dodona, Prishtinë
1997–1998	Shifemi në gjyq Bac	Goni	Studio e Aktrimit
2008–2009	Sonte jam vetëm	Anri	Teatri i Babës, Prishtinë
2011–2012	Killing Me Softly	Bruno	Teatri Dodona, Prishtinë
2015	Svetica Tame (The Dark Saint)	–	Sarajevë, BiH
2018	Bretkosa	Zeka	Teatri Kamertal AAB, Prishtinë

=== Film ===
Year	Title	Role	Production / Country
1996	Atje ku nuk lind dielli	–	Arena, Prishtinë
2000	Shtëpia e tmerrit	Luli	Albafilm, Prishtinë
2005–2006	Rozafa	Agim	Sunaj Raça, Kosovë
2012	Code of Life (Kodi i Jetës)	Cile	Kosovë
2015	The Life of Flowers	Nick	Sarajevë, BiH
2016	Terorista	Roli kryesor	Sarajevë / Budapest
2017	Invisible	–	BiH
2017	Žaba	Dardan	BiH

=== Television series ===
Year	Title	Role	Production / Country
2001	Kamera me yjet	–	TV AA, Prishtinë
2002–2003	Kandidati për president	Presidenti	RTK, Kosovë
2005–2006	Zogjtë e luftës	Agimi	RTK, Kosovë
2006–2007	Kaçurrelët	Goni	RTK, Kosovë
2010–2011	Shtëpia ime	Artan	Sunaj Raça, Kosovë
2010–2016	Lud, Zbunjen, Normalan	Mentor Kosova	BiH
2018	Konak kod Hilmije	Agim Rugoba	Sarajevë, BiH
2022	Tre Vllaznit	Bajram Bytyqi	Prishtinë, Kosovë
