= Feđa Isović =

Bosnian screenwriter (born 1965)

- Born: 25 February 1965 (age 61); Trebinje, SR Bosnia and Herzegovina, SFR Yugoslavia
- Education: Academy of Fine Arts Sarajevo
- Occupation: Screenwriter
- Years active: 2005–present

Feđa Isović (born 25 February 1965) is a Bosnian screenwriter.

His most popular work is the Bosnian sitcom Lud, zbunjen, normalan. Isović also wrote the screenplay for the 2012 film Halima's Path.

Since 2010, he has been a part of Bosnian pop-rock band Karne, a group he formed alongside Miraj Grbić and Goran Navojec. With Karne, he released one album called Diktatura amatera in 2012.

== Filmography ==
=== As actor ===
==== Television ====
Year	Title	Role	Notes
2008–2013; 2016	Lud, zbunjen, normalan	Selver/Examiner	Sporadic appearances between 2008 and 2013, one appearance in 2016
2013	Kriza	Gas supplier	Appeared in one episode in 2013

=== Film ===
Year	Title	Director	Writer	Producer	Notes
2005	Dobro uštimani mrtvaci	No	Yes	No	Co-Writer
2012	Halima's Path	No	Yes	No	

=== Television ===
Year	Title	Director	Writer	Producer	Notes
2007–2021	Lud, zbunjen, normalan	No	Yes	No	Creator as well
2013–2014	Kriza	No	Yes	No	Creator as well
2016	Lažni svjedok	No	Yes	No	Creator as well
2018	Ne diraj mi mamu	No	Yes	No	Creator as well
2018–2019	Konak kod Hilmije	No	Yes	No	Creator as well

== Discography ==
=== with Karne ===
- Diktatura amatera - 2012
