= Kriza (TV series) =

- Genre: Sitcom
- Created by: Feđa Isović
- Written by: Feđa Isović
- Directed by: Elmir Jukić
- Starring: Nikola Kojo; Enis Bešlagić; Aleksandar Seksan; Mirvad Kurić
- Theme music composer: Nedim Babović
- Opening theme: Nedim Babović
- Country of origin: Bosnia and Herzegovina
- No. of seasons: 2
- No. of episodes: 24

Production
- Producer: Davor Pušić
- Production locations: Sarajevo, Bosnia and Herzegovina
- Cinematography: Milenko Uherka
- Running time: 30 minutes

Original release
- Network: FTV (2013–2014); RTL Televizija (2013–2014)
- Release: 20 October 2013 – 30 March 2014

Kriza (Bosnian for 'Crisis') is a Bosnian television sitcom created and written by Feđa Isović and directed by Elmir Jukić.

The first episode of the show was aired on 20 October 2013. The final, 24th episode of the sitcom was aired on 30 March 2014.

== Cast ==
- Nikola Kojo as Aleš Firdus
- Enis Bešlagić as Miron Firdus
- Aleksandar Seksan as Zrinko Parkaš-Kifla
- Mirvad Kurić as Nedo Jeremić-Jeremija
- Marija Pikić as Ema Firdus
- Vanesa Glođo as Nejra Nametak
- Jasna Diklić as Borka
- Nikolina Jelisavac as Psychiatrist
- Dragan Marinković as Jose
- Tatjana Šojić as Nina Kraljevic
- Robert Krajinović as Zoran
