= Outsider (1997 film) =

- Film poster
- Directed by: Andrej Košak
- Written by: Andrej Košak
- Starring: Demeter Bitenc; Miranda Caharija; Nina Ivanič; Jure Ivanušič; Davor Janjić; Uroš Potočnik; Zijah Sokolović
- Cinematography: Sven Pepeonik
- Edited by: Zlatjan Čučkov
- Music by: Saša Lošić
- Distributed by: RTV Slovenija; Bindweed Soundvision
- Release date: 1997
- Running time: 100 minutes
- Country: Slovenia
- Language: Slovene

Outsider is a film produced in 1997 in Slovenia by writer and director Andrej Košak. The film was selected as the Slovenian entry for the Best Foreign Language Film at the 70th Academy Awards, but was not accepted as a nominee.

The film's action takes place in the 1980s in the former Yugoslavia. It covers issues such as the former Yugoslav punk rock scene and drug use in the year when Josip Broz Tito died.

The story begins in autumn 1979 when Sead Mulahasanović, whose father was a Warrant Officer (zastavnik) of Yugoslav People's Army moved to Ljubljana and started attending one of the local secondary schools. He immediately joined local punkers who formed a band. Because punk rock in Yugoslavia was not tolerated some of them quickly fell into trouble. Authorities were on high alert because Tito got seriously ill and was admitted to University Medical Centre Ljubljana. Sead spent a lot of time with his new friends because his father was devoted only to the army and wanted Sead to join the army school to become an officer or a pilot. After joining army school he developed extreme anxiety and was feared of being molested again.

Sead fell in love with Metka, a girl from his class, so he also began spending his time with her. Then several things occurred: one of his friends was beaten by the police and put to prison, he was punished by his father for not being devoted enough to the ideas of socialism, Metka got pregnant and they were again forced to move, so Sead should leave his life behind and start it anew. He didn't hold out any more and committed suicide - coincidentally it happened on the day when Tito died.

Outsider was the top grossing Slovenian film (91,000) until Branko Đurić's film Kajmak in marmelada (over 100,000 viewers).

== Cast ==
- Davor Janjić .... Sead Mulahasanović 'Sid'
- Nina Ivanič .... Metka Hafner
- Uros Potočnik .... Borut Kadunc 'Bomba'
- Jure Ivanušič .... 'Podgana'
- Zijah Sokolović .... Zastavnik Haris Mulahasanović
- Miranda Caharija .... Marija Mulahasanović
- Demeter Bitenc .... Direktor

== Movie goofs ==
- There is a scene shot on Rusjanov trg in Fužine neighborhood, which shows a little hill in front of the high skyscrapers. This part of Fužine was built around 1987, seven years after the time when the movie takes place.

== See also ==
- List of submissions to the 70th Academy Awards for Best Foreign Language Film
- List of Slovenian submissions for the Academy Award for Best Foreign Language Film
