= Legends (TV series) =

American crime drama television series

- Genre: Crime drama Action; Thriller
- Based on: Legends: A Novel of Dissimulation by Robert Littell
- Developed by: Howard Gordon; Jeffrey Nachmanoff; Mark Bomback
- Starring: Sean Bean; Ali Larter; Morris Chestnut; Tina Majorino; Steve Harris; Youssef Tounzi; Amber Valletta; Mason Cook; Steve Kazee; Winter Ave Zoli; Klára Issová; Aisling Franciosi; Anna Rust; Kelly Overton; Ralph Brown
- Composers: Reinhold Heil; Tree Adams
- Country of origin: United States
- Original language: English
- No. of seasons: 2
- No. of episodes: 20

Production
- Executive producers: Howard Gordon; Alexander Cary; Jonathan Levin; Brad Turner; David Wilcox; Joseph McKay; Ethan Reiff; David Semel; Cyrus Voris; Kenneth Biller
- Producers: Sean Bean; Kelly A. Manners; Jamie Payne
- Cinematography: Yasu Tanida; Sidney Sidell; Mathias Herndl
- Editors: James Kilton; Scott Lerner; Tod Feuerman; Scott Boyd; Lise Johnson; David Lebowitz; Mark C. Baldwin; Stephen Mark; Scott Powell; Leonard Jordan
- Running time: 60 minutes
- Production companies: Paperboy Productions (season 2); Teakwood Lane Productions; Fox 21 Television Studios (Note: Credited as Fox 21 for the first season)

Original release
- Network: TNT
- Release: August 13, 2014 – December 28, 2015

Legends is an American crime drama television series that aired on TNT from August 13, 2014, to December 28, 2015. Developed by Howard Gordon, Jeffrey Nachmanoff, and Mark Bomback, the series is based on the 2005 book Legends: A Novel of Dissimulation written by Robert Littell. On December 4, 2014, TNT renewed Legends for a 10-episode second season, which premiered on November 2, 2015. On December 15, 2015, TNT canceled the series after two seasons and 20 episodes.

== Premise ==
Martin Odum (Bean) is an undercover FBI agent who changes himself into a different person for each case. A "mysterious stranger" (played by Billy Brown) causes him to question his sanity.

== Cast ==
=== Season 1 ===
- Sean Bean as Martin Odum, an undercover agent working for the FBI's Division of Covert Operations (DCO) who struggles with his real identity outside of his legends.
- Ali Larter as Crystal McGuire, a fellow operative who has a brief romantic history with Martin.
- Morris Chestnut as Tony Rice, an FBI agent who is trying to uncover secrets he believes Martin is hiding. He recently became part of the DCO team and now helps Martin.
- Tina Majorino as Maggie Harris, the rookie member of the DCO team and an expert data manipulator.
- Steve Harris as Nelson Gates, director of the DCO task force.
- Amber Valletta as Sonya Odum, Martin's estranged wife.
- Mason Cook as Aiden Odum, Martin's pre-teen son.
- Rob Mayes as Troy Quinn, a member of the DCO team.

=== Season 2 ===
- Sean Bean as Martin Odum
- Steve Kazee as Curtis Ballard
- Winter Ave Zoli as Gabrielle Miskova
- Klára Issová as Ilyana Crawford
- Aisling Franciosi as Kate Crawford
- Kelly Overton as Nina Brenner
- Ralph Brown as Terrence Graves
- Anna Rust as Khava Bazaeva
- Morris Chestnut as Tony Rice (guest star)
- Nikola Đuričko as Tamir Zakayev
- Gershwyn Eustache Jr as Simon Hardy
- Adnan Hasković as General-President Arsanov
- Eric Godon as older Ivanenko
- Igor Skvarica as Beslan
- Jeremy Colton as Benson

== Production ==
=== Music ===
The score of season 2 concludes with "Until We Go Down" by Ruelle, played during the climax of "The Legend of Alexei Volkov". Prior to this, the song was introduced to television as the opening theme of The Shannara Chronicles.

== Episodes ==
Season	Episodes	Originally released	
Season	Episodes	First released	Last released
1	10	August 13, 2014	October 8, 2014
2	10	November 2, 2015	December 28, 2015

=== Season 1 (2014) ===
No. overall	No. in season	Title	Directed by	Written by	Original release date	US viewers (millions)
1	1	"Pilot"	David Semel	Story by : Howard Gordon & Mark Bomback and Jeffrey Nachmanoff; Teleplay by : Mark Bomback and Jeffrey Nachmanoff	August 13, 2014	2.58
2	2	"Chemistry"	Brad Turner	David Wilcox and Ethan Reiff & Cyrus Voris	August 20, 2014	1.73
3	3	"Lords of War"	Brad Turner	Story by : Josh Pate and Ethan Reiff & Cyrus Voris; Teleplay by : Josh Pate	August 27, 2014	1.76
4	4	"Betrayal"	Deran Sarafian	Story by : Josh Pate & David Wilcox and Ethan Reiff & Cyrus Voris; Teleplay by : Josh Pate & David Wilcox	September 3, 2014	1.74
5	5	"Rogue"	Karen Gaviola	Andrew Wilder	September 10, 2014	1.43
6	6	"Gauntlet"	Brad Turner	Andrew Wilder	September 17, 2014	1.63
7	7	"Quicksand"	Terrence O'Hara	Josh Pate	September 24, 2014	1.45
8	8	"Iconoclast"	John Behring	Geoff Aull	October 1, 2014	1.06
9	9	"Wilderness of Mirrors"	Milan Cheylov	Josh Pate	October 8, 2014	1.08
10	10	"Identity"	Brad Turner	David Wilcox	October 8, 2014	1.08

=== Season 2 (2015) ===
No. overall	No. in season	Title	Directed by	Written by	Original release date	US viewers (millions)
11	1	"The Legend of Dmitry Petrovich"	Jamie Payne	Ken Biller	November 2, 2015	0.68
12	2	"The Legend of Kate Crawford"	Jamie Payne	Raf Green	November 9, 2015	0.48
13	3	"The Legend of Curtis Ballard"	Alrick Riley	Aaron Allen	November 23, 2015	0.58
14	4	"The Legend of Ilyana Zakayeva"	Alrick Riley	Andrew Chapman	November 30, 2015	0.72
15	5	"The Legend of Terrence Graves"	Jon Jones	Matthew Newman	December 7, 2015	0.67
16	6	"The Legend of Tamir Zakayev"	Jon Jones	Chris Levinson	December 14, 2015	0.51
17	7	"The Second Legend of Dmitry Petrovich"	Jeff T. Thomas	Raf Green	December 21, 2015	0.82
18	8	"The Legend of Doku Zakayev"	Jeff T. Thomas	Aaron Allen	December 28, 2015	0.51
19	9	"The Legend of Gabi Miskova"	Ken Biller	Andrew Chapman & Raf Green	December 28, 2015	0.40
20	10	"The Legend of Alexei Volkov"	Ken Biller	Matthew Newman & Ken Biller	December 28, 2015	0.32

== Broadcast ==
Internationally, the series premiered in Australia on November 11, 2015, on FX.

Saudi Arabia and the rest of the Middle East & North Africa On February 4, 2016, BBC First HD started airing the first episode of the second season of the series on OSN (Orbit Showtime Network).

== Critical reception ==
Legends scored 59 out of 100 on Metacritic based on 27 "mixed or average" reviews. The review aggregator website Rotten Tomatoes reported a 56% critics rating with an average rating of 6/10 based on 32 reviews. The website consensus reads: "Legends lacks originality, but derives watchability from Sean Bean's fine central performance".

== Development ==
With its second season, it was revealed Legends would be reimagined. The show would now focus on Bean's character's identity, with most of the original cast being replaced and the initial California setting was replaced for London and continental Europe (Paris and Prague). British veteran TV-directors Jamie Payne (Indian Summers, The White Queen, The Hour) and Alrick Riley (Hustle, Spooks/MI-5, CSI) were added to the show. Ken Biller (Legend of the Seeker, Perception) became the new showrunner/executive producer/lead writer, and developed a brand new nonlinear storyline taking place in different countries and flashbacks to Bean's character's childhood at a British boarding school and scenes from Prague in 2001.

== Promotion ==
To promote the series, TNT launched an intensive advertising campaign targeted at social media beginning at the 2014 San Diego Comic-Con. Exploiting Sean Bean's reputation for varied and colorful on-screen deaths, the campaign centered around the hashtag #DontKillSeanBean, and included Bean's image on airport machinery and pillars, a poster covering multiple floors of a hotel adjoining the SDCC site, and widely distributed black T-shirts emblazoned with the hashtag in white. Producer Howard Gordon tweeted images of celebrities, including Kiefer Sutherland, Game of Thrones author George R. R. Martin and Bean himself wearing the T-shirt. The ad campaign quickly went viral on social media and became the central focus of publicity done by Bean, including a parody by the website Funny or Die.

== DVD release ==
Name	Region 1	Region 2	Region 4	Discs
Legends: The Complete First Season	October 13, 2015	TBA	TBA	3
