= Adnan Hasković =

Bosnian actor (born 1984)

- Born: Adnan Hasković; 23 December 1984 (age 41); Sarajevo, SR Bosnia and Herzegovina, Yugoslavia (now Bosnia and Herzegovina)
- Education: Academy of Performing Arts in Sarajevo
- Occupation: Actor
- Years active: 2003–present

Adnan Hasković (born 23 December 1984) is a Bosnian actor.

== Biography ==
Adnan Hasković studied acting at the Academy of Performing Arts in Sarajevo from 2003. He studied under professor Izudin Bajrović and then under professor Admir Glamočak. His professional debut was shown in Narodno Pozorište Sarajevo (Public Theater Sarajevo) with theater performance in Legenda o Ali-paši (English: Legend of Ali Pasha), and then Tvrđava (English: Tower), Prvi put s ocem na izbore (English: First time with dad to vote), Jedan čovjek i jedna žena, ženidba (English: One man and one wife: The Marriage), Balada o Omeru i Merimi (English: Balad of Omer and Merima).

Adnan also acted in numerous Bosnian films including: FedEx, Prva plata (English: First paycheck), Miješano meso za četiri osobe (English: Mixed meat for four people), Teško je biti fin (English: It's hard to be nice).

First acting participation with SARTR (Sarajevo War Theater) in the play Ana Karenina (he played Ložač), and from 1 July 2008 he became an employed member of acting ensemble of SARTR.

His latest film, Venuto al mondo (2012), stars Penélope Cruz and was filmed in his home country of Bosnia and Herzegovina.

== Filmography ==
Actor
Year	Title	Role	Notes
2005	Prva plata	Unknown	Short
2007	It's Hard to Be Nice	Lik	
2007	Lud, zbunjen, normalan	Majstor	Episode: "Crni fond"
2007	Ritam života	Vehabija	
2008	Orange Blanket	Unknown	Short
2008	Résolution 819	Muhammad	TV movie
2008–2009	Pecat	Saša	12 episodes
2009–2010	Kućni ljubimci	Dino	7 episodes
2010	Sevdah za Karima	Juka	
2011	Dva smo svijeta različita	Laki	3 episodes
2011	Posthumous	Unknown	Short
2011	Body Complete	Slobodan	
2012	Venuto al mondo	Gojko	
2013	Snowpiercer	Franco the Younger	
2013	Ja sam iz Krajine, zemlje kestena	Huska	
2014	Reket	Amil	
2015	Legends	General-President Arsanov	4 episodes
