= Dolina sunca =

- Genre: Soap opera
- Created by: Diana Pečkaj Vuković
- Country of origin: Croatia
- Original language: Croatian
- No. of seasons: 1
- No. of episodes: 210

Original release
- Network: HRT 1
- Release: 21 September 2009 – 15 July 2010

Dolina sunca ("Valley of the Sun") is a Croatian soap opera produced by Croatian Radiotelevision. It was broadcast on HRT 1 from 2009 to 2010.

== Plot ==
Eva Kralj, a beautiful widow, wishing to start a new life, moves from Zagreb to the lively place of Jablanovo. Upon arrival in Jablanovo, Eva discovers a shocking secret: her late husband led a double life and lived with Julija Vitezović, his mistress with whom he had a child. Julija, the popular mayor of Jablanovo, has a wealthy family and a large agricultural estate.

The two women pass through a challenging time of hostility, dating, and approaching. Eva's arrival in Jablanovo turns the settlement upside down. Two men slowly enter Eva's life, the withdrawn and charming Andrija and Christian, but she is still hurt emotionally. Andrija and Kristijan fall for Eva, but they both have their problems: Andrija carries a burden of guilt for a serious accident that took place in Jablanovo, while Kristijan had faced betrayal and the struggle for supremacy in the family business.

== Cast ==
- Bojana Gregorić as Julija Vitezović (2009–2010)
- Ana Vilenica as Eva Kralj (2009–2010)
- Robert Kurbaša as Andrija Bukovac (2009–2010)
- Ivan Herceg as Kristijan Vitezović (2009–2010)
- Tamara Šoletić as Loreta (2009–2010)
- Marija Omaljev-Grbić as Nataša Sever Vitezović (2009–2010)
- Petar Ćiritović as Juran Vitezović (2009–10)
- Slavko Sobin as Matej Zlatarić (2010)
- Visnja Babic as Ruza Bukovac (2009–10)
- Krunoslav Saric as Ivan (2009–10)
- Csilla Barath-Bastaic as Lada (2009–10)
- Vlasta Ramljak as Adela (2009–10)
- Zijad Gračić as Nikola (2009–10)
- Otokar Levaj as Dr. Otto (2009)
- Nikča Marinović as Fra Jakov (2009–10)
- Sandra Lončarić as Visnja Horvat (2009–10)
- Alan Katić as Kruno (2009–10)
- Nives Canovic as Tina (2009–10)
- Ozren Domiter as Karlo (2009–10)
- Ranko Zidarić as Gordan Tomek (2010)
- Mirna Medaković as Sonja (2009–10)
- Marija Tadić as Irena (2009–10)
- Nadezda Perisic-Nola as Renata (2010)
- Barbara Prpić as Stela (2009–10)
- Miraj Grbić as Lawyer (2009)
