= I Won't Come Back =

- Directed by: Ilmar Raag
- Written by: Yaroslava Pulinovich
- Produced by: Natalia Drozd; Sergey Selyanov
- Starring: Polina Pushkaruk; Vika Lobacheva; Andrey Astrakhantsev
- Cinematography: Tuomo Hutri
- Music by: Panu Aaltio
- Release date: 12 June 2014
- Running time: 109 minutes
- Countries: Russia; Kazakhstan
- Language: Russian

I Won't Come Back (Russian: Ya ne vernus) is a 2014 drama film directed by Estonian director Ilmar Raag.

== Plot ==
Anya is a graduate student who is implicated in a drugs bust after a visit from an old friend and runs from the police sent to arrest her. Due to her youthful looks, she poses as a homeless teenager and allows herself to be taken to an orphanage. Here, she meets Kristina, a 12-year old street-smart but troubled girl. When Anya runs away from the orphanage, Kristina follows her and talks her into traveling to her grandmother's village in Kazakhstan. Along the way, Anya gradually assumes responsibility for the younger girl.

== Cast ==
- Polina Pushkaruk - Anya
- Vika Lobacheva - Kristina
- Andrey Astrakhantsev - Andrey Lucius
- Sergej Jacenjuk
- Galina Mochalova

== Production ==
I Won't Come Back (Ya ne vernus in Russian) was co-directed by Estonian director Ilmar Raag. Some sources cite Dmitry Sheleg as co-director.

== Accolades ==
The film received a special jury mention in the Nora Ephron Prize at the Tribeca Festival in New York City, and won the Mirror Award at the Andrei Tarkovsky International Film Festival.

It also won the Urania Award for Best Feature at the 2014 Let's CEE Film Festival in Vienna, Austria.
