= Body Complete =

2012 film

- Theatrical release poster
- Directed by: Lukas Sturm
- Written by: Lukas Sturm
- Produced by: Robert Hofferer; Lukas Sturm; Puls 4
- Starring: Asli Bayram; Senad Bašić; Miraj Grbić; Adi Hrustemović; Amel Bečić; Adnan Hasković; Marija Omaljev-Grbić; James Hallett
- Cinematography: Šahin Šišić
- Release date: May 21, 2012 (France)
- Countries: Bosnia and Herzegovina; Austria
- Languages: German, English, Bosnian

Body Complete is a 2012 film with an international cast by the producers Robert Hofferer and Lukas Sturm as well as the co-producer Puls 4 from 2011. Lukas Sturm directed the film and also wrote the script. Asli Bayram plays the leading role.

== Background ==
The film deals with the impact of the Bosnian War on society. The ethnic cleansing during this cruel war in the heart of Europe happened in the sphere of influence of two men: former politician Radovan Karadžić, accused of being a war criminal, and former general Ratko Mladić, who was caught during the shooting of this film. Mladić is being held responsible for the mass murder of at least 8,000 unarmed Bosnian civilians in Srebrenica in July 1995. The story of the film is set in this historical background.

The filming mainly took place at authentic settings in Sarajevo and its surroundings. The former Bosnian commander and defender of Sarajevo, Mirsad Ćatić, acted as advisor for military history and appeared in a guest role. Research assistants under the supervision of Kathryne Bomberger from ICMP (International Commission on Missing Persons) in Sarajevo gave the producers and actors advice concerning forensic anthropology and DNA identification of the victims found in the mass graves. The organisation "Women of Srebrenica", regularly staging demonstrations to ensure that the search for lost men, children and relatives will continue, travelled to Sarajevo to play a part in one of the key scenes of the film.

== Cast ==
- Asli Bayram as Nicole
- Senad Bašić as Murat
- Adnan Hasković as Slobodan
- Miraj Grbić as Mayor
- Adi Hrustemović as Branko
- James Hallett as George
- Jan Henrik Stahlberg as Phillip
- Anne Mertin as Dr. Mertens
- Amel Bečić as Bojan
- Marija Omaljev-Grbić as Alma
- Mirsad Tuka as Doctor
