= Igor Skvarica =

Bosnian actor (born 1986)

- Born: 26 August 1986 (age 40); Tuzla, SR Bosnia and Herzegovina, SFR Yugoslavia
- Education: Academy of Performing Arts in Sarajevo
- Occupation: Actor
- Years active: 2011–present

Igor Skvarica (born 26 August 1986) is a Bosnian actor who has performed in film, television, theatre and radio.

He is best known for his roles in television sitcom Konak kod Hilmije (2018–2019) as Durmiš and in films Chefurs Raus! (2013), With Mom (2013), The Prosecutor the Defender the Father and His Son (2015). He also played an exciting role of Beslan in the last season of the Sean Bean starring TV Series Legends (2015).

His theatre work includes appearances in "Stones in His Pockets"(Marie Jones), "The Life Before Us" (Romain Gary), "Animal farm" (George Orwell), "The Lower Depths" (Maxim Gorky), "A Streetcar Named Desire" (Tennessee Williams). Skvarica studied acting at the Academy of Performing Arts in Sarajevo.

== Filmography ==
=== Feature films ===
- Fearing in Sarajevo (2016)
- The Prosecutor the Defender the Father and His Son (2015)
- With Mom (2013)
- Chefurs Raus! (2013)

=== Shorts ===
- Big Leap (2018)
- Breath (2018)
- Kisa iz vedra neba (2016)
- The Wall (2014)
- Da vam nacrtam (2011)

=== Television ===
- Konak kod Hilmije (2018–2019)
- Legends (2015)
- Lud, zbunjen, normalan (2015)
- Robin Hood (2025)
