= Petelinji zajtrk (novel) =

1999 novel by Feri Lainšček

- Author: Feri Lainšček
- Language: Slovenian
- Publication date: 1999
- Publication place: Slovenia

Petelinji zajtrk ("Rooster's Breakfast") is a novel by Slovenian author Feri Lainšček. It was first published in 1999.

The novel follows a group of friends from the outskirts of the city who gather around the eccentric mechanic Gajaš. Here are the inn singer Malačiči, the melancholic professor of philosophy Batistula, the manager of the fleet Pavlica, the dentist with the significant surname Zobar and the owner of the local night scene Lepec.
