= Nives Ivanković =

Croatian actress

- Born: 1 June 1967 (age 59); Duvno, SR Bosnia and Herzegovina, SFR Yugoslavia
- Education: Academy of Performing Arts in Sarajevo
- Alma mater: University of Sarajevo
- Occupation: Actress
- Years active: 1992–present

Nives Ivanković (born 1 June 1967) is a Croatian actress. She is notable for her comedic TV roles as Miki in Nad lipom 35 (2006–2009), Ajna Hećimić in Lud, zbunjen, normalan (2010–2011) and Nives "Seke" Odak in Ruža vjetrova (2011–2013).

== Biography ==
Ivanković was born on 1 June 1967 in Duvno. She attended elementary and secondary school in Split and graduated in acting from the Academy of Performing Arts at the University of Sarajevo. She is a permanent member of the drama theatre in Split, for 19 years. Ivanković is a television, film and theatre actress award-winning (awards Marul for role in Mare Libre, the Golden Smile on Dani satire etc.), and for the general public she is known for her roles on the TV series: Nad lipom 35, Lud, zbunjen, normalan, Balkan Inc., Villa Maria, Bibin svijet etc.

== Personal life ==
Nives Ivanković lives and works in Split.

== Filmography ==
Film
Year	Title	Role	Notes
1998	Kanjon opasnih igara	Hilda Stolzer	
1998	Agonija	Izabela Georgijevna	
1999	Četverored	Bosiljče	
2004	A Wonderful Night in Split	Marija	
2007	I Have to Sleep, My Angel	Maca	
2015	The High Sun	Jelena's mother / Zorka Jelić	
2021	The Staffroom	Vedrana	

Television
Year	Title	Role	Notes
1991–1994	Jel' me netko tražio?	Miki	Main cast
2004–2005	Villa Maria	Nataša Jug	Main cast
2006	Balkan Inc.	Duda	Main cast
2006–2009	Nad lipom 35	Miki	Main cast
2010	Nova u Dragošju	Miki	Television special
2010	Bibin svijet	Magda	Guest star (1 episode)
2010–2011	Lud, zbunjen, normalan	Ajna Hećimić	Main cast
2011–2013	Ruža vjetrova	Nives "Seke" Odak	Main cast
2014	Piratskattens Hemlighet	Ursula	Swedish Christmas TV-series
2016–2018	Novine	Jelena Krsnik	
