= Marko Naberšnik =

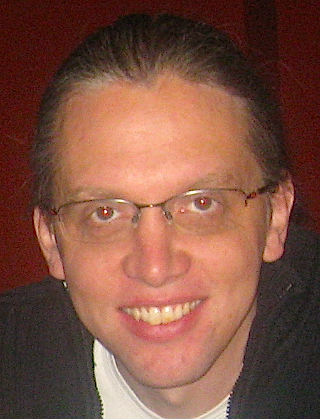
Marko Naberšnik (2012)

Marko Naberšnik (born 1973) is a Slovenian television and film director and screenwriter. His first film Rooster's Breakfast (2007) was a box-office hit in Slovenia.

== Early life ==
Marko Naberšnik was born on 12 April 1973 in Maribor, Slovenia.

He attended an 8-week filmmaking program at New York Film Academy in 1996, and in 2010 received a master's degree from the Academy of Theatre, Radio, Film and Television (AGRFT) in Ljubljana.

== Career ==
Naberšnik has done much work for television, as well as having made a few films.

His debut feature film was Rooster's Breakfast (2007), which was the "third most-watched Slovenian film of all time", won the CBS Critics Award at the South East European Film Festival in Los Angeles, and was the official Slovenian entry for the Academy Awards that year.

Naberšnik's second feature film, Shanghai Gypsy (2012), which screened at the Cleveland International Film Festival in the US in April 2013, was based on the novel The Untouchables (Nedotakljivi) by Feri Lainšček, telling a multi-generational story of the Slovenian Romani Mirga family. The film won the Best Screenplay award at the Montreal World Film Festival.

His World War I drama The Woods Are Still Green (2014), starring Michael Kristof and Simon Serbinek, was produced and co-written by Austrian filmmaker Robert Hofferer, with Hefferer's production company Artdeluxe Films as well as Perfo Production. It was described by Elizabeth Kerr in The Hollywood Reporter as "a timely meditation on the futility of war and its ability to dehumanize and degrade".

== Other activities ==
As of 2022 he was a professor at AGRFT in Ljubljana.
