= Petra Cicvarić =

Croatian actress

- Born: 29 March 1986 (age 40); Osijek, SR Croatia, SFR Yugoslavia
- Occupation: Actress
- Years active: 2009–present
- Partner: Peđa Gvozdić
- Children: 1

Petra Cicvarić (born 29 March 1986) is a Croatian actress.

== Filmography ==
=== Television roles ===
Film
Year	Title	Role	Notes
2009–2011	Najbolje godine	Korana Lotar	Role in Croatian telenovela
2011–2013	Ruža vjetrova	Sara Matošić	Role in Croatian telenovela
