= Ilmar Raag =

Estonian screenwriter and film director

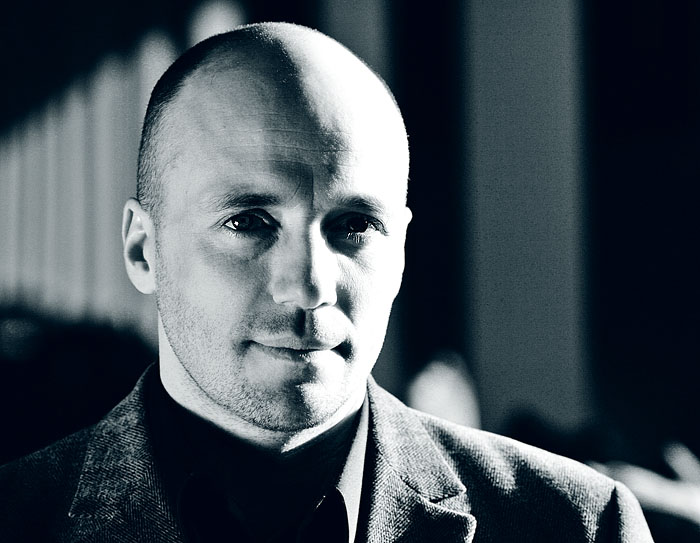
- Raag in 2007
- Born: 21 May 1968 (age 58); Kuressaare, then part of Estonian SSR, Soviet Union
- Occupations: Film director, screenwriter, actor

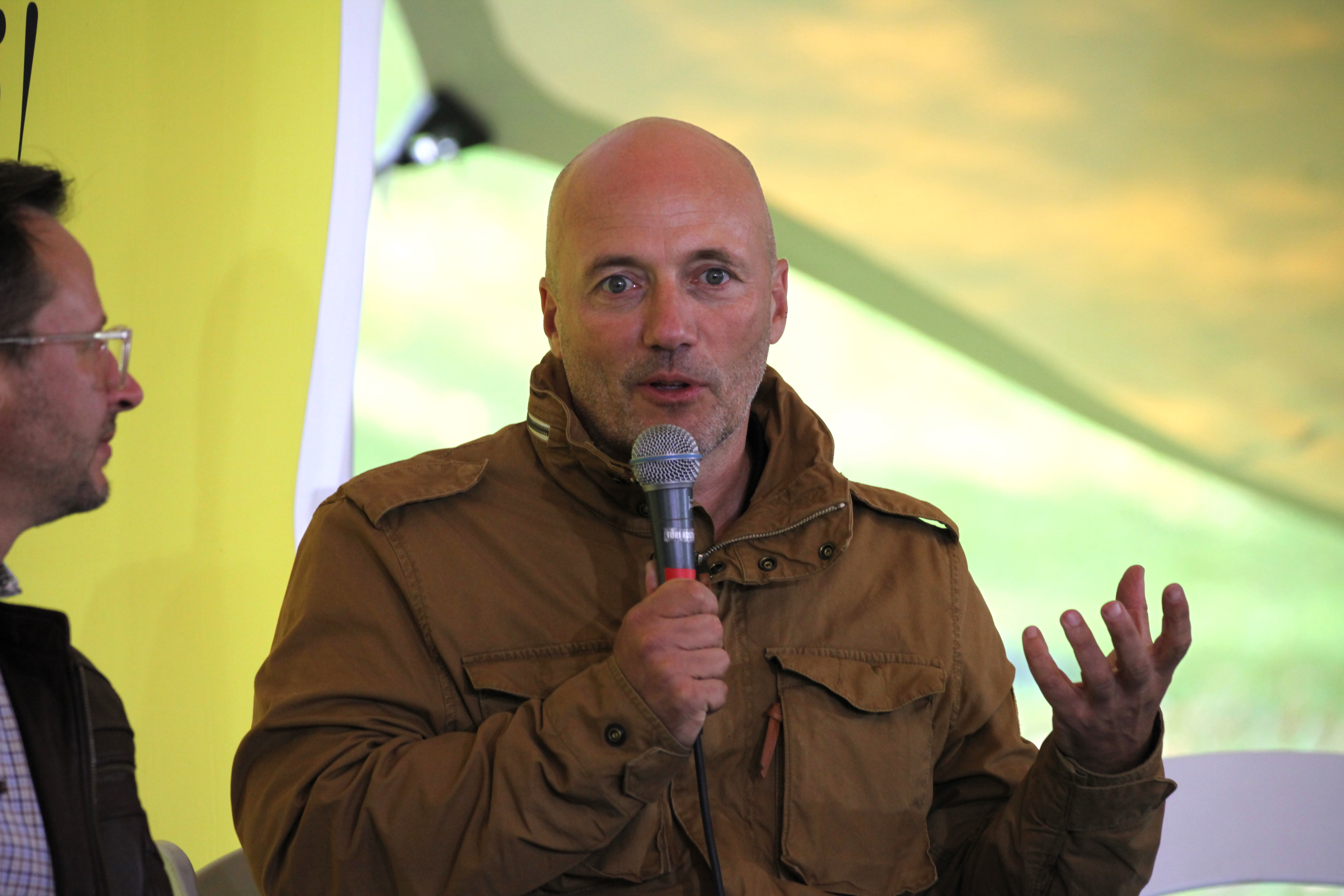
Ilmar Raag at the Opinion Festival 2021 in Paide, Estonia

Ilmar Raag (born 21 May 1968 in Kuressaare) is an Estonian politician, security expert, screenwriter and film director, best known for his socio-critical film The Class. He was CEO of Estonian Television from 2002 to 2005. He is a well known columnist in many prestigious Estonian newspapers (Postimees, Eesti Päevaleht). He has written many scripts and directed critically acclaimed films, notably August 1991 and The Class.

== Life ==
Raag was born in Kuressaare on 21 May 1968. He received his high school education from Aleksander Mui (:et) secondary school No 2 of Kingissepa. He graduated from University of Tartu in 1997 and received his M.A. degree in screenwriting from Ohio University, the School of Telecommunications (1999). He made internships in Hollywood development departments (New Regency, Phoenix Pictures). His further career took him to the TV management. After being the Head of Acquisitions for Estonian National Television, he was promoted to the Chairman of the Board of the same TV company. In 2002, he staged a play in one of the Estonian theaters (Ugala). At the same time, he started to consult and doctor Estonian feature scripts. In 2004, he wrote two TV feature scripts. He directed one of them - August 1991 as made-for-TV movie for Estonian Television and the other, One More Croissant got the third prize at Hartley Merill International Screenwriting Competition and the support from MEDIA New Talent program.

Eager to continue his filmmaking career, he quit as CEO of Estonian Television and made his first feature film The Class in 2007. Since then he shot a feature in France Une Estonienne à Paris with Jeanne Moreau and Laine Mägi in leading roles, back in Estonia Kertu that was released in 2013 and in Russia I Won't Come Back After a pause, a children fantasy film Erik Stoneheart was released in 2022.

Ilmar Raag has been active in Estonian public life as an opinion leader. He was recognised as the opinion leader of the year 20213 by the daily newspaper Postimees. Ilmar Raag worked as adviser on strategic communication in the Estonian Government Office from 2015-2016 and promoted his understanding of the strategic communication as interagency action based form of communication.

After the Russian full scale aggression against Ukraine in 2022, Ilmar Raag was actively supporting Ukraine. He was in the board of the Estonian NGO "Slava Ukraini" where he collaborated with the inquiery to investigate the allegations of the misuse of donated money. Ilmar Raag was also the founding member of the NGO "Saunas for Ukraine".

Ilmar Raag was three times deployed to Africa with Estonian Defence Forces. He is an Estonian reserve officer and active member of Estonian Defence League.

== Filmography ==
=== Director ===
- 2025 So they fight (documentary on Ukraine)
- 2022 Erik Kivisüda (aka Erik Stoneheart)
- 2014 I Won't Come Back
- 2015–2017 Vaba mehed (television series)
- 2013 Kertu (aka Love Is Blind)
- 2012 Une Estonienne à Paris (aka A Lady in Paris)
- 2007 Klass (The Class)
- 2005 August 1991 (television film)
- 1998 Tappev Tartu (Killing Tartu) (amateur film)

=== Writer ===
- 2013 Kertu
- 2012 Une Estonienne à Paris
- 2010 Klass: Elu pärast (television miniseries)
- 2010 September (documentary)
- 2008 Mina olin siin (I Was Here)
- 2007 Klass (The Class)
- 2005 Libahundi needus (television film)
- 2005 August 1991 (television film)
- 1998 Tappev Tartu (Killing Tartu) (amateur film)

=== Actor ===
- 2010 Klass: Elu pärast (television miniseries)
- 2008 Tuulepealne maa (television series)
- 2006 Tabamata ime
- 2005 Kohtumine tundmatuga (television film)
- 2004 Visions of Europe (segment "Estonia: Euroflot")
- 1998 Tappev Tartu (Killing Tartu) (amateur film)
- 1997 Minu Leninid (aka All My Lenins)
