= Alma Prica =

Croatian actress (born 1962)

- Born: 17 September 1962 (age 62); Zagreb, PR Croatia, FPR Yugoslavia
- Occupation: Actress
- Years active: 1983–present
- Awards: Order of Danica Hrvatska

Alma Prica (born 17 September 1962) is a Croatian actress. She graduated from the Zagreb Academy of Drama Arts in 1985 and then joined the Croatian National Theatre in Zagreb (HNK Zagreb) in 1986. Although primarily a theatre actress, she also appeared in numerous film and television productions.

Prica received a number of awards throughout her career, including two Golden Arena for Best Actress awards - in 1993 for the portrayal of Dora Pejačević, alongside Rade Šerbedžija, in the biopic Kontesa Dora; and in 2003 for her role in Vinko Brešan's film Witnesses.

== Selected filmography ==
- My Uncle's Legacy (Život sa stricem, 1988)
- Countess Dora (Kontesa Dora, 1993)
- The Old Oak Blues (Srce nije u modi, 2000)
- Witnesses (Svjedoci, 2003)
- Halima's Path (Halimin put, 2012)
- The Diary of Diana B. (Dnevnik Diane Budisavljević) (2019)
