= Miraj Grbić =

Bosnian American actor

- Born: 17 July 1976 (age 50); Sarajevo, SR Bosnia and Herzegovina, SFR Yugoslavia
- Citizenship: Bosnia and Herzegovina; United States
- Education: Academy of Performing Arts; University of Sarajevo
- Occupation: Actor
- Years active: 1996–present
- Spouse: Marija Omaljev (m. 2008)
- Children: 2

Miraj Grbić (born 17 July 1976) is a Bosnian–American film, television and theater actor.

== Biography ==
Grbić graduated from the Academy of Performing Arts in Sarajevo at the University of Sarajevo, where he earned an M.A. degree in acting. Since 1996, he has performed in more than 60 plays on the main stage of the Sarajevo National Theatre. He starred in almost 40 feature films in US, Bosnian, Croatian, German, Austrian, Italian, Irish, Polish, Turkish, Macedonian, Australian and Canadian productions.

He starred as Bogdan in Mission: Impossible – Ghost Protocol, Mitar in Remake, Goran in The Hunting Party, Mustafa in Halima's Path. Grbić starred in television shows such as American Horror Story, S.W.A.T., Santa Clarita Diet, Gang Related, Ruža vjetrova, Lud, zbunjen, normalan, Viza za budućnost, etc.

From 2010 to 2014, he was the lead singer of Bosnian pop-rock group Karne made out of actors, writers and doctors. With the group, Grbić released one album called Diktatura amatera in 2012.

== Personal life ==
Grbić married Croatian actress Marija Omaljev in 2008. Since 2013, they have been living together in Los Angeles, California, United States. On 15 October 2021, their daughter Billie was born.

== Selected filmography ==
=== Film ===
Year	Title	Role	Notes
2002	Where Eskimos Live	Additional actor	
2003	Remake	Mitar	
2003	Here	Žutan	
2003	Summer in the Golden Valley	Ćupo	
2005	Go West	Serbian soldier	
2006	All for Free	Rođo	
2007	It's Hard to Be Nice	Recepcionist	
2007	The Hunting Party	Goran, Thug #1	
2010	As If I Am Not There	Commander	
2011	Little hands	Marsel	Short film
2011	Mission: Impossible – Ghost Protocol	Bogdan	
2012	Body Complete	Mayor	
2012	Halima's Path	Mustafa	
2013	Selam	Nikolai	
2021	F9	Russian	
2023	Fast X	Russian	
2024	When Santa Was a Communist	Zoka	

=== Television ===
Year	Title	Role	Notes
2002–2004	Viza za budućnost	Lawyer Spasić	24 episodes
2007–2014; 2020–2021	Lud, zbunjen, normalan	Čombe	114 episodes
2009	Dolina sunca	Lawyer	2 episodes
2012	Larin izbor	Džin	3 episodes
2012–2013	Ruža vjetrova	Ranko Mrčela	145 episodes
2014	Gang Related	Ivan Letnov	1 episode
2017	American Horror Story: Cult	Wojciech Frykowski	1 episode
2018	S.W.A.T.	Melvin	1 episode
2019	Santa Clarita Diet	Vlado	1 episode
2020	Better Things	Cesario	1 episode

== Discography ==
=== with Karne ===
- Diktatura amatera - 2012
