= Halima's Path =

- Film poster
- Directed by: Arsen Anton Ostojić
- Written by: Feđa Isović
- Produced by: Arsen Anton Ostojić; Davor Pušić; Slobodan Trninić; Janez Ković
- Starring: Alma Prica; Olga Pakalović; Mijo Jurišić; Izudin Bajrović; Miraj Grbić; Mustafa Nadarević
- Music by: Mate Matišić
- Release date: 18 October 2012 (Sarajevo)
- Running time: 93 minutes
- Countries: Bosnia and Herzegovina; Croatia; Slovenia
- Language: Bosnian

Halima's Path (Bosnian: Halimin put) is 2012 Bosnian-Croatian-Slovenian drama film about a grieving, but strong-willed Bosniak woman, Halima, who must track down her estranged niece in order to recover the bones of her son lost during the war in Bosnia in the 1990s. The film was selected as the Croatian entry for the Best Foreign Language Film at the 86th Academy Awards, but it was not nominated.

== Plot ==
In 1977, fifteen years before the Bosnian War ravaged their lives, Halima's (Alma Prica) niece Safija (Olga Pakalović) became pregnant by Slavomir (Mijo Jurišić), a Serb man. Beaten and ostracized by her Bosniak family, Safija gave the infant boy to the childless Halima to raise, telling Slavomir it was stillborn. Twenty-three years later, the devastating war has ended. Bodies are being identified through DNA samples and returned to families for burial. Halima's husband is found, but Mirza's bones cannot be returned to her without a blood sample. And that would have to come from Safija who ran away years ago and married Slavomir. When Halima finally locates her, Safija refuses the blood test because she is afraid her husband will discover her deception. And other deceptions could be uncovered as well, including the shocking identity of the soldier who took Halima's husband and the boy to their deaths.

== Cast ==
- Alma Prica – Halima
- Olga Pakalović – Safija
- Mijo Jurišić – Slavomir
- Izudin Bajrović – Salko
- Miraj Grbić – Mustafa
- Mustafa Nadarević – Avdo
- Emina Muftić – Nevzeta
- Marko Plesnik – Mirza at age 16
- Mihailo Koncar – Mirza at age 9
- Daria Lorenci (credited as Daria Lorenci Flatz) – Rapka
- Faketa Salihbegović (credited as Faketa Salihbegović-Avdagić) – Vezirka
- Aldin Tucić – Aron
- Dejan Aćimović – Jovan
- Sebastian Cavazza – Planinsek
- Marija Omaljev-Grbić – Waitress

== Background ==
The screenplay was inspired by the real-life story of Bosniak couple Zahida and Muharem Fazlić from a village near Prijedor in western Bosnia whose adopted son Emir was executed in the Korićani Cliffs massacre of 1992. It took them 12 years to find their son's biological mother who kept refusing to give her blood for the DNA identification of Emir's remains. They found that Emir's biological mother was residing in Zagreb, Croatia. Emir's biological sister resides in Vitez, Bosnia, and, unlike their mother, was completely willing to give her blood for the DNA test, should Emir's bones be found.

Zahida Fazlić died in May 2011.

== Production ==
Feđa Isović wrote the first draft of the script in the middle of the 2000s decade, for his friend Benjamin Filipović, with whom he had previously worked with on the black comedy Dobro uštimani mrtvaci (Well-Tempered Corpses) in 2005. After Filipović's death on 20 July 2006, the script was handed over to Croatian director Arsen Anton Ostojić, who directed the final version of the film.

Filming began on 27 February 2012 in Pisarovina.

The movie is available with English or French subtitles.

== Releases and screenings ==
The film was first shown at the 59th Pula Film Festival in July 2012. It had its official release on 18 October 2012 in the Bosnian cities of Sarajevo, Mostar, Zenica and Banja Luka, followed by its premiere in Zagreb, Croatia on 23 October 2012 and wide release on 25 October.

It was screened at the 22nd Cottbus Film Festival in Germany on 9 and 10 November 2012 and the 16th Tallinn Black Nights Film Festival in Estonia that same month. It was also shown at the 35th Cairo International Film Festival in Egypt in December 2012, the 29th Mons International Film Festival d’Amour in Belgium in February 2013 and the 20th Febiofest in Prague in March 2013.

The film had its American premiere at the South East European Film Festival in Los Angeles, California on 4 May 2013. The following week, it was screened at the Bosnian-Herzegovinian Film Festival in New York City.

== Awards ==
Halima's Path won several awards in film festivals throughout the world. It won, among others, the "Grand Prix prize" at both the International Festival of Mons in Belgium and at the 19th Mediterranean Film Festival in Morocco. It was also voted the best film at the Morocco festival.

== See also ==
- List of submissions to the 86th Academy Awards for Best Foreign Language Film
- List of Croatian submissions for the Academy Award for Best Foreign Language Film
