= Aslı Bayram =

German actress and writer

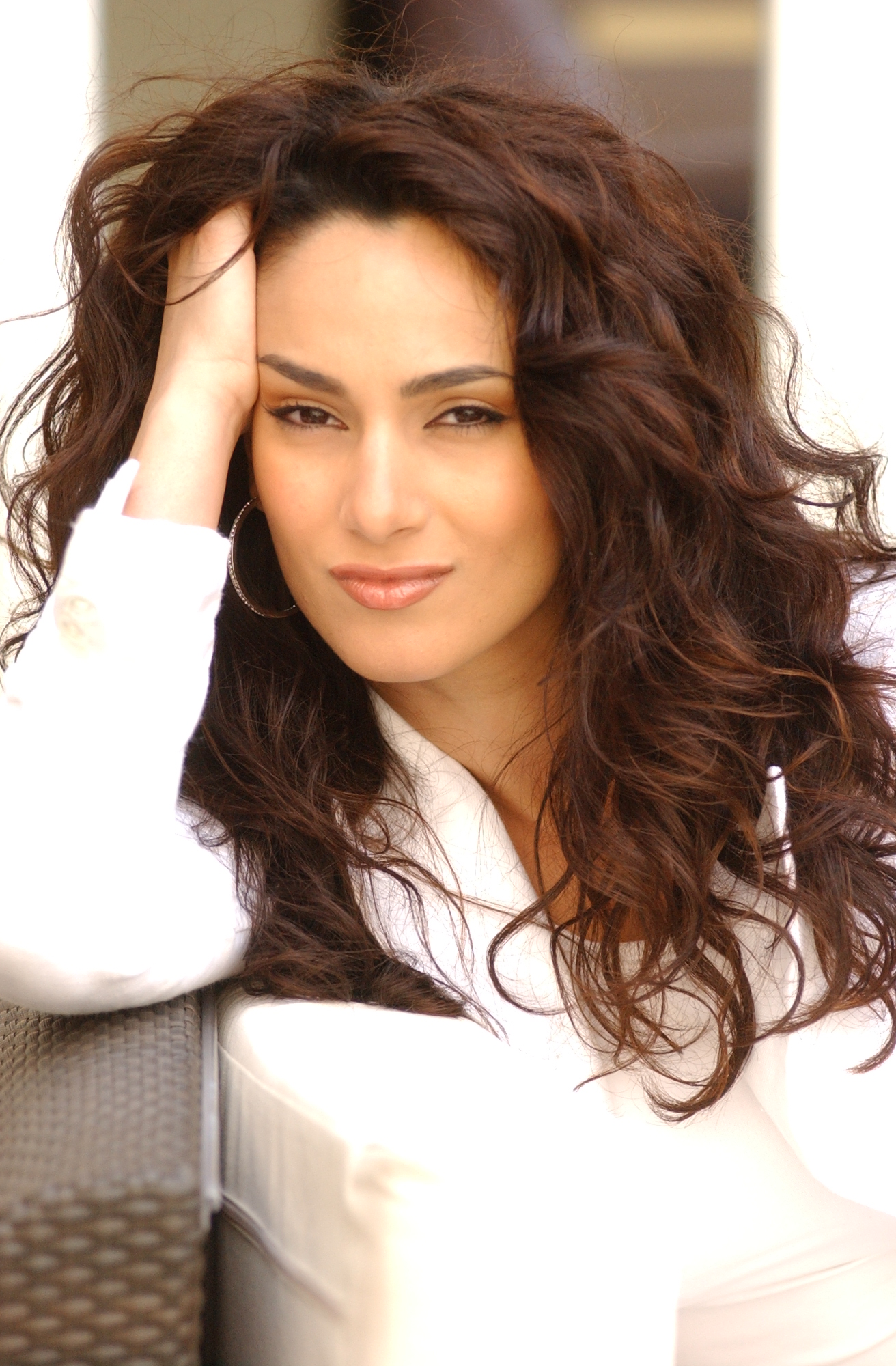
- Aslı Bayram in 2003
- Born: 1 April 1981 (age 45); Darmstadt, West Germany
- Occupation: Actress
- Website: www.asli-bayram.com

Aslı Bayram (born 1 April 1981) is a German actress, writer and beauty pageant titleholder. She is of Turkish descent. Since 2010, she is an Ambassador for Crime Prevention by the Justice Ministry Hessen.

== Life and career ==
Bayram was born in Darmstadt, West Germany. In 1994, her father was shot dead by a Neo-Nazi and she was shot in the left arm.

In 2005 Bayram won the Miss Germany contest and also participated in the Miss Universe 2005 contest in Bangkok. She has widely been regarded as being the first Miss Germany with Turkish roots.

Bayram completed actors' training with Eric Morris, Los Angeles, and Anne Mertin, Vienna.

The first international film she starred in was Jump! with Patrick Swayze. Ensuing, she appeared in a very prominent role in the black comedy "Short Cut to Hollywood", shot in the US and presented at the 2009 Berlinale.

In October 2007, Aslı Bayram performed for the first time professionally on stage and to critical acclaim in the solo theater performance Anne Frank: The Diary at the Théatre de la Ville D’Esch in Luxembourg. An invitation at the Theatre Festival of German language in Prague followed, and afterwards the German premiere in Frankfurt/Main. Buddy Elias, Anne Frank's cousin, complimented Aslı Bayram on this project.

In 2008/2009 she toured with the English language version in Canada and the USA. She finished the project on occasion of the commemoration of Anne Frank's 80th birthday with three performances at the Museum of Tolerance in Los Angeles, Hollywood. The Times described her performance in Anne Frank: The Diary as "...emerging as one of Germany's most convincing and subtle actresses".

In 2009 she also authored the book Grenzgängerin - Leben zwischen den Welten (Border Crosser. Life between Worlds), published 2009 by Random House.

In 2009, she participated in the Swiss production 180° and the Bosnian film Sevdah za Karima (English title: Sevdah for Karim). For both roles there she required no lip-synchronization necessary. Aslı Bayram performed in both the national languages, Swiss German and Bosnian. Both films were successful on the festival circuit screening at festivals Internationally: Zurich, Sarajevo, Pec', Antalya, Goteborg, Rotterdam and Berlin.

The Hollywood Reporter praised her performance in the film 180° stating that, "Asli Bayram in a very few scenes delivers a heartbreaking portrait of a young woman navigating between two worlds while living in neither of them."

In September 2010 her book Grenzgängerin - Leben zwischen den Welten achieved a record in the Guinness World Records for the number of most people in a public reading relay.

Aslı Bayram campaigns publicly against racism and xenophobia. Since 2010 Aslı Bayram is appointed honorable Ambassador for Crime Prevention by the Justice Ministry Hessen, Germany. She also was made the honorary Patron of the Riehl-School in Wiesbaden, which has many pupils from immigrant backgrounds.

Since 2011 Aslı Bayram has performed the female lead role in a Turkish television serial on Star TV, Sirat.

In July 2011, she performed the lead role in the international thriller Body Complete, performing in both the English and German languages alongside a veteran cast of Hollywood and Broadway actors. The film was shot in Sarajevo and its surrounding regions, and Vienna. Body Complete was screened at 14 festivals worldwide and won 7 awards. Bayram won two Best Actress awards, at the New York International Riverlight Film Festival 2012 and the American International Film Festival 2012.

In August 2011, Bayram starred in the feature film Shanghai Gypsy, a love story filmed in Italy and Slovenia. In the leading role, Bayram performed in Italian language and the Romani language. In the same year she co-starred in the German ARD-TV film Die Wüstenärztin (The Desert Doctor), shot in Namibia, Doha and Vienna. For this role she learned the essential parts of her text in Arabic.

Asli most recently appeared in David Frankel's comedy film One Chance, alongside James Corden and Julie Walters, shot mainly in Venice and the UK.

== Education ==
Abitur at the Max-Beckmann-Schule in Frankfurt am Main, drama training in Vienna with Anne Mertin.

== Filmography ==
- Miss Universe 2005 (documentary, 2005)
- Beyza'nin kadinlari - English title: Shattered Soul (2006)
- Jump! - with Patrick Swayze, Heinz Hoenig, Anja Kruse (movie, 2006)
- Short Cut to Hollywood with Jan Henrik Stahlberg and Marcus Mittermeier, (movie, 2007), in Post-production
- 2010: 180° – Wenn deine Welt plötzlich Kopf steht (actress, Kinospielfilm)

Sevdah za Karima (movie, 2010) - English title: Blues for Karim (2010)

- Sirat (TV series 2011)
- Naked Harbour (movie 2011)
- Body Complete (movie 2011)
- Shanghai Gypsy (movie 2011)
- Die Wüstenärztin (TV series 2011)
- One Chance (movie 2013)
- Woman in Gold (2015)

== Books ==
- 2009 Grenzgängerin - Leben zwischen den Welten (Border Crosser. Life between Worlds). Random House. ISBN 3579068806,
