= Marija Omaljev-Grbić =

Croatian-American actress

Marija Omaljev
- Born: 5 December 1982 (age 43); Novi Sad, SR Serbia, SFR Yugoslavia
- Other name: Mara Omaljev
- Education: Academy of Performing Arts
- Occupation: Actor
- Years active: 2000–present
- Spouse: Miraj Grbić (m. 2008)
- Children: 2

Marija Omaljev (born 5 December 1982) is a Croatian–American film, theater and television actress.

== Biography ==
Marija Omaljev, also known as Mara Omaljev and Mara Auriel, was born on 5 December 1982 in Novi Sad, SR Serbia, then part of SFR Yugoslavia. As a pre-teen she moved with her family to Rovinj, Croatia, where she graduated elementary school and high school. In high school, she was a member of Rovinj's theater Gandusio, while she also played in her school's drama assemble.

In 2003, she entered Academy of Performing Arts at the University of Sarajevo, Bosnia, where she earned her M.A. degree in acting. Mara started her professional acting career on the main stage of the Sarajevo National Theatre, where she performed in various classical and contemporary plays. She also starred as a leading actress in more than ten prime time TV series and TV sitcoms such as Zakon ljubavi, Dolina sunca, Lud, zbunjen, normalan, Ruža vjetrova, The Real O'Neals as well as in Croatian, Bosnian, German, Austrian, Turkish and American feature Films.

She married a Bosnian-American actor Miraj Grbić in 2008. Since 2013, they are living in Los Angeles, California, United States. They had a daughter Billie on October 15, 2021

== Filmography ==
=== Film ===
| Year | Title | Role | Notes |
|---|---|---|---|
| 2007 | Beyond Mercy | | |
| 2008 | Ta tvoja ruka mala | | |
| 2012 | Body Complete | Alma | |
| 2012 | Halima's Path | Waitress | |
| 2012 | Moviestar | Amrita Zosima | |
| 2017 | Uber | Svetlana | |

=== Television ===
| Year | Title | Role | Notes |
|---|---|---|---|
| 2008 | Pečat | Sanja | 21 episodes |
| 2008 | Zakon ljubavi | Una Perković | 57 episodes |
| 2009 | Bračne vode | Sunčana | |
| 2009 | Vrata do vrata | Nina | |
| 2008 | Zauvijek mlad | Marija | 3 episodes |
| 2009–2010 | Dolina sunca | Nataša Sever-Vitezović | 192 episodes |
| 2010 | Kućni ljubimci | Žaklina | 1 episode |
| 2010–2013 | Lud, zbunjen, normalan | Barbara | 20 episodes |
| 2011–2013 | Ruža vjetrova | Mila Visković | 213 episodes |
| 2014 | About a Boy | Woman in Stacey's Yoga Class | 1 episode |
| 2016 | The Real O'Neals | Dream Woman | 1 Episode |
