= Feri Lainšček =

Slovenian writer, poet, and screenwriter (born 1959)

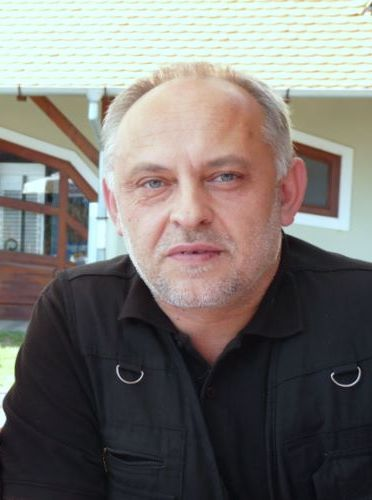
- Born: Franc Lainšček; October 5, 1959 (age 67); Dolenci, Socialist Federal Republic of Yugoslavia (now Slovenia)
- Occupations: Writer, poet, screenwriter
- Writing career
- Notable works: Petelinji zajtrk (Rooster's Breakfast, 1999)

Feri Lainšček (born 5 October 1959), also known as Franc Lainšček, is a Slovenian writer, mainly of novels for both adults and youth. Many of his novels have been adapted into films, including the box-office hit Rooster's Breakfast, based on his 1999 novel Petelinji zajtrk. He has won many awards for his novels, and in 2021 he received the Prešeren Lifetime Achievement Award.

== Early life and education ==
Feri Lainšček was born on 5 October 1959 into a Slovene Lutheran family in the village of Dolenci (part of Šalovci), in northeastern Slovenia, then part of the Socialist Federal Republic of Yugoslavia. He studied journalism at the University of Ljubljana.

== Career ==
Lainšček is a writer, poet, and screenwriter. He has written at least 25 novels, most of which have been translated into other languages, and many of which have been made into films.

He started work at Radio Ljubljana, on both the daily news and drama editorial teams, until around 1983, when he became a freelance writer.

He has written for both adults and young people. His 1990s novels represent a departure from the (post)modernist pattern towards realistic fiction. He did not contemporary literary groups of his time, such as the Nova revija or Literatura revija.

His 1999 novel, Petelinji zajtrk (Rooster's Breakfast), became the basis of the screenplay for Marko Naberšnik's 2007 film Rooster's Breakfast, which was highly successful at the box office.

His 2007 novel The Untouchables (Nedotakljivi) became the basis of another film by Naberšnik, Shanghai Gypsy (2012). The book and film tell a multi-generational story of the Slovenian Romani Mirga family, and the film won the Best Screenplay award at the Montreal World Film Festival.

Lainšček has also created works in the Prekmurje Slovene dialect, professing a Prekmurje identity.

== Politics ==
In the parliamentary elections of 2008, Lainšček ran for the Slovenian National Assembly for the social liberal party Zares.

== Recognition and awards ==
- 1986: Kajuh Award, for Raza
- 1992: Kresnik Award (best novel of the year), for Namestome koga roža cveti
- 1995: Prešeren Award, for Ki jo je megla prinesla
- 2001: Večernica Award (best youth text), for Mislice, a book of fairy tales
- 2007: Kresnik Award (best novel of the year), for Muriša
- 2012: Destanica Award, for Pesmi o Mišku in Belamiška
- 2020: Nomination, Kresnik Award (among 5 finalists), for Kurji pastir
- 2021: Prešeren Lifetime Achievement Award

== Personal life ==
Lainšček lives in the town of Murska Sobota, in the Prekmurje region.

He is also known as Franc Lainšček. (Note: As yet no definitive source to say that he was born with this name.)
