= Olga Pakalović =

Croatian actress

- Born: 8 November 1978 (age 47); Zagreb, SR Croatia, SFR Yugoslavia
- Education: Academy of Dramatic Art
- Alma mater: University of Zagreb
- Occupation: Actress
- Years active: 1993–present
- Spouse: Samia Bergamane (m. 2013; div. 2013)
- Children: 1

Olga Pakalović (born 8 November 1978) is a Croatian actress. She has appeared in more than twenty films since 1993.

== Filmography ==
=== Films ===
Year	Title	Role	Notes
2002	Fine Dead Girls	Iva	
2003	The Doctor of Craziness		
2007	Play Me a Love Song	Anja	
2008	Look at Me	Mina	
2012	Halima's Path		
2014	Happy Endings	Goranka	
2016	Ministry of Love	Sandra	
2017	The Avalanche		
2017	The Mystery of Green Hill		
2019	General	Milica	

TV
Year	Title	Role	Notes
2002	Novo doba	Maja	1 episode
2006	Bumerang	Katarina	4 episodes
2009–2010	Mamutica	Željka	19 episodes
2016–2020	Novine	Alenka Jović Marinković	33 episodes
2017–2018	Čista ljubav	Branka Vitez Balog	173 episodes
2019–2020	Drugo ime ljubavi	Karmela Batinić	175 episodes
2021	Dar mar	Zana	2 episodes
2022–2024	Kumovi	Vesna Gotovac	423 episodes
