= Dinko Paleka =

Dinko Paleka is a Croatian director, producer, writer and actor. Born in 1979. in Croatia. As of 2012, he is the managing director of FreemantleMedia Croatia. Producer of Super Talent. His net worth was estimated to be £1.2 million in 2014.

== Filmography ==
=== Producer ===
- Ruža vjetrova (2011)
- Zabranjena ljubav (2007–08)

=== Director ===
- Zabranjena ljubav (2006–07)

=== Actor ===
- Zabranjena ljubav as Zvonko Basic (2006)

=== Writer ===
- Ruža vjetrova (2011–present)
