= South East European Film Festival =

- Location: Los Angeles, CA
- Founded: 2006
- Artistic director: Vera Mijojlić
- Website: www.seefilmla.org

The South East European Film Festival, also known as SEEfest, is an annual (non-profit) film festival held during the first week of May in various venues throughout Los Angeles, California. The festival presents feature films, documentaries and shorts produced in or thematically related to South East Europe and the Caucasus.

The annual film festival includes a business conference, year-round screenings and programs, all showcasing the cultural diversity of South East Europe through themes, stories and visual artistry. It seeks to establish intercultural connections between artistic communities in the United States and South East Europe.

== Awards ==
Awards are given in the following categories at the conclusion of the festival:

- Best Feature Film
- Best Cinematography in a Feature Film
- Best Debut Feature
- Best Documentary Film
- Best Cinematography in a Documentary Film
- Best Short Fiction
- Best Short Documentary
- Best Animation Short
- Audience Award for Best Narrative Film
- Audience Award for Best Documentary Film

Additional awards have also been presented to honor cinema of the region and individuals who have made an impact. In 2015, Academy Award-winning actor George Chakiris (West Side Story) was honored with the Legacy Award, and Romanian actor Victor Rebengiuc (Medal of Honor) received the Lifetime Achievement Award.... In 2016, Croatian film director Veljko Bulajic was honored as the 2016 SEE Film Legend.

== History ==
SEEfest was founded in 2006 by Vera Mijojlić, long-time film critic and cultural entrepreneur.

Special curatorial effort is dedicated to SEEfest retrospectives and screenings of archival treasures. In 2011, the festival collaborated with the UCLA Film and Television Archive to organize retrospectives of Slovenian cinema spanning from 1950 to 2010. In 2012, SEEfest presented the tenth anniversary celebration of the Academy Award-winning film from Bosnia Herzegovina, No Man’s Land, directed by Danis Tanović, and it also collaborated with the Austin Film Society on a program of South East European films from the 21st century. That same year, it collaborated with the Los Angeles Filmforum and Harvard Film Archive on a retrospective of landmark 1960-70s short films from Serbia by the internationally acclaimed director Vlatko Gilić. The retrospective was subsequently screened at the Pacific Film Archive in Berkeley, California in 2013, and at the National Gallery of Art in Washington, DC in 2014

The world premiere of Andreas Prochaska’s Sarajevo, an Austrian-German-Czech co-production, opened the 9th annual SEEfest on May 1, 2014 at the Writers Guild Theater in Beverly Hills, marking the 100th anniversary of the events in Sarajevo in 1914 that led to World War I

== Reception ==
In 2012, SEEfest was voted by staffers of Flavorwire as one of the 10 best “under-the-radar” film festivals in America. In 2013, SEEfest received recognitions from the California Assembly, County of Los Angeles and City of Los Angeles “for enhancing the cultural life and creating opportunities for cultural exchange between Southern California and South East Europe” and “contribution to the cultural vitality of Los Angeles.”

In 2015, on the occasion of the 10th anniversary of the festival, SEEfest received commendation from the Board of Supervisors of the Los Angeles County for “[giving] American audiences a cinematic view of the people, cultures and dynamics of the 18 participating countries and ethnic groups from Southeastern Europe. SEEfest promotes this region by showcasing its best feature films, documentaries, shorts and animation.”

SEEfest was awarded the Festival Grant from the Academy of Motion Picture Arts and Sciences in 2012 and 2014.
