= List of Croatian submissions for the Academy Award for Best International Feature Film =

Best International Feature Film submissions from Croatia

Highlights
- Debut: 1992
- Submissions: 36
- Nominations: none
- Oscar winners: none

Croatia has submitted films for the Academy Award for Best International Feature Film (Note: The category was previously named the Academy Award for Best Foreign Language Film, but this was changed to the Academy Award for Best International Feature Film in April 2019, after the Academy deemed the word "Foreign" to be outdated.) since 1992. The award is handed out annually by the United States Academy of Motion Picture Arts and Sciences to a feature-length motion picture produced outside the United States that contains primarily non-English dialogue. It was not created until the 1956 Academy Awards, in which a competitive Academy Award of Merit, known as the Best Foreign Language Film Award, was introduced for non-English speaking films, and has been given annually since. Croatia unsuccessfully tried to submit a film in 1991 while the country was in the process of achieving international recognition.

As of 2026, Croatia has submitted thirty-six films, but none of them have been nominated.

== Submissions ==
The Academy of Motion Picture Arts and Sciences has invited the film industries of various countries to submit their best film for the Academy Award for Best International Feature Film since 1956. The International Feature Film Committee oversees the process and reviews all the submitted films. Following this, they vote via secret ballot to determine five nominees for the award.

Prior to independence, Croatian actors and filmmakers participated in the Yugoslav film industry and several films made by Croatian filmmakers or produced by Croatian-based film studios were submitted for Oscar consideration representing Yugoslavia. Of these films, two received a nomination: The Road a Year Long (1958), directed by Giuseppe De Santis (co-produced by Croatian film companies Croatia Film and Jadran Film), and The Ninth Circle (1960), directed by France Štiglic (produced by Jadran Film).

According to Academy rules, the selection of each country's official submission has to be made by "one organization, jury or committee that should include artists and/or craftspeople from the field of motion pictures". In Croatia's case the selection committee and procedure are organized by the Film Artists' Association of Croatia (Hrvatsko društvo filmskih djelatnika or HDFD). Film producers and directors can submit a film for consideration to HDFD, which verifies the completeness of the application and compliance with Academy rules. According to the latest revision of the HDFD criteria in 2007, these include that the film must have had its cinema release between 1 October and 30 September in the preceding year and that the application enclosed must contain a written statement confirming that all financial obligations to performers and craftspeople involved with the film's production have been fulfilled. A 17-member committee composed of HDFD members then proceeds to vote for nominated films in a secret ballot.

Since independence, five Croatian filmmakers have had multiple films submitted to the Academy for review. Branko Schmidt, Arsen Anton Ostojić and Zrinko Ogresta had three of their films selected, and two other filmmakers had two films submitted: Vinko Brešan and Dalibor Matanić.

Below is a list of the films that have been submitted by Croatia for review by the Academy by year and the respective Academy Awards ceremony.

Year (Ceremony)	Film title used in nomination	Original title	Language(s)	Director(s)	Result
1991 (64th)	Fragments: Chronicle of a Vanishing	Krhotine - Kronika jednog nestajanja	Croatian	Zrinko Ogresta	Disqualified
1992 (65th)	Story from Croatia	Priča iz Hrvatske	Croatian	Krsto Papić	Not nominated
1993 (66th)	Countess Dora	Kontesa Dora	Serbo-Croatian, Croatian	Zvonimir Berković	Not nominated
1994 (67th)	Vukovar: The Way Home	Vukovar se vraća kući	Serbian, Croatian	Branko Schmidt	Not nominated
1995 (68th)	Washed Out	Isprani	Croatian	Zrinko Ogresta	Not nominated
1996 (69th)	Nausikaya	Nausikaja	Serbo-Croatian	Vicko Ruić	Not nominated
1997 (70th)	Lapitch the Little Shoemaker	Čudnovate zgode šegrta Hlapića	Croatian, English, German	Milan Blažeković	Not nominated
1998 (71st)	Transatlantic	Transatlantik	Croatian	Mladen Juran	Not nominated
1999 (72nd)	Red Dust	Crvena prašina	Croatian	Zrinko Ogresta	Not nominated
2000 (73rd)	Marshal Tito's Spirit	Maršal	Croatian	Vinko Brešan	Not nominated
2001 (74th)	Queen of the Night	Kraljica noći	Croatian	Branko Schmidt	Not nominated
2002 (75th)	Fine Dead Girls	Fine mrtve djevojke	Croatian	Dalibor Matanić	Not nominated
2003 (76th)	Witnesses	Svjedoci	Croatian	Vinko Brešan	Not nominated
2004 (77th)	Long Dark Night	Duga mračna noc	Croatian	Antun Vrdoljak	Not nominated
2005 (78th)	A Wonderful Night in Split	Ta divna splitska noć	Croatian, Serbian, English	Arsen Anton Ostojić	Not nominated
2006 (79th)	Libertas	Libertas	Croatian, Venetian, Italian	Veljko Bulajić	Not nominated
2007 (80th)	Armin		Bosnian, Croatian, German, English	Ognjen Sviličić	Not nominated
2008 (81st)	No One's Son	Ničiji Sin	Croatian	Arsen Anton Ostojić	Not nominated
2009 (82nd)	Donkey	Kenjac	Croatian	Antonio Nuić	Not nominated
2010 (83rd)	The Blacks	Crnci	Croatian	Goran Dević and Zvonimir Jurić	Not nominated
2011 (84th)	72 Days	Sedamdeset i dva dana	Croatian, Serbian	Danilo Šerbedžija	Not nominated
2012 (85th)	Vegetarian Cannibal	Ljudožder vegetarijanac	Croatian	Branko Schmidt	Not nominated
2013 (86th)	Halima's Path	Halimin put	Bosnian	Arsen Anton Ostojić	Not nominated
2014 (87th)	Cowboys	Kauboji	Croatian	Tomislav Mršić	Not nominated
2015 (88th)	The High Sun	Zvizdan	Croatian	Dalibor Matanić	Not nominated
2016 (89th)	On the Other Side	S one strane	Croatian	Zrinko Ogresta	Not nominated
2017 (90th)	Quit Staring at My Plate	Ne gledaj mi u pijat	Croatian	Hana Jušić	Not nominated
2018 (91st)	The Eighth Commissioner	Osmi povjerenik	Croatian	Ivan Salaj	Not nominated
2019 (92nd)	Mali		Croatian	Antonio Nuić	Not nominated
2020 (93rd)	Extracurricular	Dopunska nastava	Croatian	Ivan-Goran Vitez	Not nominated
2021 (94th)	Tereza37		Croatian	Danilo Šerbedžija	Not nominated
2022 (95th)	Safe Place	Sigurno mjesto	Croatian	Juraj Lerotić	Not nominated
2023 (96th)	Traces	Tragovi	Croatian	Dubravka Turić	Not nominated
2024 (97th)	Beautiful Evening, Beautiful Day	Lijepa večer, lijep dan	Croatian	Ivona Juka	Not nominated
2025 (98th)	Fiume o morte!		Fiuman, Croatian, Italian	Igor Bezinović	Not nominated
2026 (99th)	God Will Not Help	Bog neće pomoći	Croatian, Spanish	Hana Jušić	Pending

== See also ==
- List of Yugoslav submissions for the Academy Award for Best International Feature Film
- List of Academy Award winners and nominees for Best International Feature Film
- List of Academy Award-winning foreign language films
- Cinema of Croatia
