= Golden Arena for Best Cinematography =

- Country: Yugoslavia (1955–1990); Croatia (1992–present)
- Presented by: Pula Film Festival Jury
- First award: 1955
- Currently held by: Jana Plećaš (2020)
- Website: Official Website

== List of winners ==
The following is a list of winners of the Golden Arena for Best Cinematography at the Pula Film Festival.

=== Yugoslav competition (1955–1990) ===
Year	Winner	English title(s)	Original title(s)
1955	Frano Vodopivec	The Girl and the Oak	Djevojka i hrast
1956	Aleksandar Sekulović	Big and small	Veliki i mali
1957	Nenad Jovičić (shared)	Priests Ćira and Spira	Popovi Ćira i Spira
1957	Aleksandar Sekulović (2) (shared)	Saturday Night	Subotom uveče
1958	Mihajlo Popović	The Sky Through the Trees	Kroz granje nebo
1959	Aleksandar Sekulović (3)	Alone	Sam
1960	Ivan Marinček	The Ninth Circle	Deveti krug
1961	Rudi Vavpotič	Ballad About a Trumpet and a Cloud	Balada o trobenti in oblaku
1962	Aleksandar Sekulović (4)	Siberian Lady Macbeth	Sibirska Ledi Magbet
1963	Mile de Gleria	Wild Growth	Samorastniki
1964	Tomislav Pinter		Pravo stanje stvari
1965	Tomislav Pinter (2)	Prometheus of the Island	Prometej s otoka Viševice
1966	Tomislav Pinter (3)	Monday or Tuesday & Rondo	Ponedjeljak ili utorak & Rondo
1967	Tomislav Pinter (4)	I Even Met Happy Gypsies & The Birch Tree	Skupljači perja & Breza
1968	Ivica Rajković	& I Have Two Mothers and Two Fathers	Gravitacija ili fantastična mladost činovnika Borisa Horvata & Imam dvije mame i dva tate
1969	Frano Vodopivec (2)	An Event & When You Hear the Bells	Događaj & Kad čuješ zvona
1970	Rudi Vavpotič (2)	Oxygen	Oxygen
1971	Milorad Jakšić	Red Wheat	Rdeče klasje
1972	Mišo Samoilovski	A Shot	Istrel / Pucanj
1973	Branko Blažina		Kužiš stari moj
1974	Nenad Jovičić (2)	The Dervish and Death	Derviš i smrt
1975	Ljube Petkovski		Jad
1976	Branko Blažina (2)	Anno Domini 1573	Seljačka buna 1573
1977	Božidar Nikolić		Beštije
1978	Živko Zalar	Bravo Maestro & Fragrance of Wild Flowers	Bravo maestro & Miris poljskog cveća
1979	Tomislav Pinter (5)	Search	Iskanja
1980	Mišo Samoilovski (2)	The Lead Brigade	Olovna brigada
1981	Tomislav Pinter (6)	The Melody Haunts My Memory	Samo jednom se ljubi
1982	Rado Likon		Razseljena oseba
1983	Živko Zalar (2)	Something In-Between	Nešto između
1984	Goran Trbuljak	Early Snow in Munich	Rani snijeg u Münchenu
1985	Božidar Nikolić (2)		Život je lep
1986	Goran Trbuljak (2)	Dreaming the Rose	San o ruži
1987	Radoslav Vladić		Na putu za Katangu
1988	Boris Gortinski		Zaboravljeni
1989	Tomislav Pinter (6)	That Summer of White Roses	Đavolji raj
1990	Jure Pervanje		Veter v mreži

=== Croatian competition (1992–present) ===
Year	Winner	English title	Original title
1991	Festival was cancelled.^{[A]}		
1992	Goran Trbuljak (3)	The Stone Gate	Kamenita vrata
1993	Slobodan Trninić	The Golden Years	Zlatne godine
1994	National competition program was cancelled.^{[B]}		
1995	Tomislav Pinter (7)	Each Time We Part Away	Svaki put kad se rastajemo
1996	Vjekoslav Vrdoljak	Nausikaya	Nausikaja
1997	Goran Trbuljak (4)		Treća žena
1998	Goran Trbuljak (5)	Transatlantic	Transatlantik
1999	Vjekoslav Vrdoljak (2)	Garcia	Garcia
2000	Darko Šuvak	Celestial Body	Nebo, sateliti
2001	Mirko Pivčević	Alone	Sami
2002	Silvio Jesenković	Serafim, the Lighthouse Keeper's Son	Serafin, svjetioničarev sin
2003	Živko Zalar (3)	Witnesses	Svjedoci
2004	Mirko Pivčević (2)	A Wonderful Night in Split	Ta divna Splitska noć
2005	Vjekoslav Vrdoljak (3)	Two Players from the Bench	Dva igrača s klupe
2006	Branko Linta	I Love You	Volim te
2007	Dragan Marković (shared)	The Living and the Dead	Živi i mrtvi
2007	Mirko Pivčević (3) (shared)	The Living and the Dead	Živi i mrtvi
2008	Davorin Gecl		Iza stakla
2009	Mirko Pivčević (4)	Donkey	Kenjac
2010	Slobodan Trninić (2)	Just Between Us	Neka ostane među nama
2011	Vanja Černjul	Daddy	Ćaća
2012	Dragan Ruljančić	Cannibal Vegetarian	Ljudožder vegetarijanac
2013	Erol Zupčević	A Stranger	Obrana i zaštita
2014	Branko Linta (2)	The Reaper	Kosac
2015	Mario Oljača	You Carry Me	Ti mene nosiš
2016	Tamara Cesarec	Shooting Stars	Narodni heroj Ljiljan Vidić
2017	Branko Linta (3)	The Constitution	Ustav Republike Hrvatske
2018	Radislav Jovanov Gonzo (shared)	Deep Cuts	Duboki rezovi
2018	Luka Matić (shared)	Deep Cuts	Duboki rezovi
2018	Dubravka Kurobasa (shared)	Deep Cuts	Duboki rezovi
2019	Sven Pepeonik	The Diary of Diana B	Dnevnik Diane Budisavljević
2020	Jana Plećaš		Mater

== Notes ==
A. Although the festival was opened on 26 July 1991 and a press screening of Zrinko Ogresta's film Fragments: Chronicle of a Vanishing was held, the festival board presided by Antun Vrdoljak decided to cancel the festival, as a sign of protest against violence related to the Ten-Day War in Slovenia and the initial stages of the Croatian War of Independence. Nine films were supposed to be screened in the competition program.
B.: The awards ceremony was cancelled in 1994 as only one Croatian feature film was made in the preceding 12 months (Bogdan Žižić's The Price of Life). The festival was held in spite of this, but the usual competition program was replaced by screenings of the classic works of the Zagreb School of Animated Film and documentaries, while the main program featured premieres of six American movies.

== Multiple winners ==
The following cinematographers have received multiple awards. Years in bold indicate wins in Yugoslav competition (1955–1990).

- 8 : Tomislav Pinter (**1964**, **1965**, **1966**, **1967**, **1979**, **1981**, **1989**, 1995)
- 5 : Goran Trbuljak (**1984**, **1986**, 1992, 1997, 1998)
- 4 : Aleksandar Sekulović (**1956**, **1957**, **1959**, **1962**)
- 4 : Mirko Pivčević (2001, 2004, 2007, 2009)
- 3 : Živko Zalar (**1978**, **1983**, 2003)
- 3 : Vjekoslav Vrdoljak (1996, 1999, 2005)
- 2 : Frano Vodopivec (**1955**, **1969**)
- 2 : Rudi Vavpotič (**1961**, **1970**)
- 2 : Mišo Samoilovski (**1972**, **1980**)
- 2 : Božidar Nikolić (**1977**, **1985**)
- 2 : Nenad Jovičić (**1957**, **1974**)
- 2 : Branko Blažina (**1973**, **1976**)
- 2 : Slobodan Trninić (1993, 2010)

== See also ==
- Cinema of Yugoslavia
- Cinema of Croatia
