= Mirko Pivčević =

Croatian cinematographer (born 1975)

- Born: 8 August 1975 (age 50); Split, Yugoslavia (present-day Croatia)
- Occupation: Cinematographer
- Years active: 1998–present

Mirko Pivčević (born 8 August 1975) is a Croatian cinematographer.

Pivčević's career began in the late 1990s, with a string of short documentary films and music videos. His first feature film was Alone (Sami, 2001), which won him his first Golden Arena for Best Cinematography award at the 2001 Pula Film Festival, the Croatian national film awards festival. His next feature film was A Wonderful Night in Split, a 2004 black-and-white film directed by Arsen Anton Ostojić, which earned him his second Golden Arena and a nomination for the Golden Frog Award at the Camerimage cinematography film festival.

Pivčević graduated from the Zagreb Academy of Drama Arts in 2007, submitting A Wonderful Night in Split as his graduation work, and that same year he won his third Golden Arena for the World War II film The Living and the Dead (Živi i mrtvi). His next project was Antonio Nuić's drama film Donkey (Kenjac) which earned him his fourth Golden Arena in 2009.

== Selected filmography ==
- Alone (Sami, 2001)
- A Wonderful Night in Split (Ta divna splitska noć, 2004)
- The Living and the Dead (Živi i mrtvi, 2007)
- Donkey (Kenjac, 2009)
- Josef (2011)
- The Priest's Children (Svećenikova djeca, 2013)
- Number 55 (Broj 55, 2014)
