= Marija Škaričić =

Croatian actress (born 1977)

- Born: 6 August 1977 (age 48); Split, SR Croatia, SFR Yugoslavia
- Occupation: Actress
- Years active: 2000–present
- Awards: Golden Arena for Best Actress; 2010 - Mother of Asphalt

Marija Škaričić (born 6 August 1977) is a Croatian actress.

== Biography ==
Marija Škaričić was born on August 6, 1977, in Split. She attended primary and secondary school in Split. As a high school student, she attended Gradsko kazalište mladih. In her third attempt she graduated the Academy of Dramatic Arts in 2003. Already in 2001 she had professional performances in plays in HNK Split, Rijeka, National Theatre, and Žar ptica.

Her first lead role was in 2004 in the movie A Wonderful Night in Split, directed by Arsen Anton Ostojić. As formal recognition, the jury Sarajevo Film Festival with Mike Leigh at the helm, awarded her the Heart of Sarajevo, the award for best actress.

Škaričić next took a running start in one of her biggest Croatian successes, the film What Is a Man Without a Moustache?, directed by Hrvoje Hribar.

2006 revived old love a second time with the local festival Heart of Sarajevo awarding Best Actress in the film Das Fräulein, directed by Andrea Staka. Marija played a young girl Ana from Sarajevo who makes friendship with a Serbian woman Ruža. Škaričić in that film appeared with Mirjana Karanović and Ljubica Jović.

There followed small movie roles in a number of Croatian films and a lead role in 2010 in the German film Shahada (in competition in the Berlin International Film Festival), and then in the film of Dalibor Matanić – Mother of Asphalt. For this role she was awarded the Golden Arena for Best Actress at the 57th Pula Film Festival and Azimut D'OR Grand Prize for Best Actress at the International Festival of Audiovisual Programs in Paris.

During this period, Marija Škaričić was one of the busiest and most awarded Croatian film actresses.

She also acted in serials Operation Kajman and Bumerang.

In 2010 the journal Globus proclaimed her one of the leaders in Croatian film (together with Daria Lorenci, Zrinka Cvitešić, Leona Paraminski, Nataša Janjić and Jadranka Đokić).

At the 61st International Film Festival in Berlin, she was officially awarded recognition. Škaričić is second Croatian actress who won that prize along with many European film stars such as Daniel Craig, Anamaria Marinca, Daniel Brühl, Rachel Weisz, Carey Mulligan.

For her role in Mare, she won Best Actress at the Sarajevo Film Festival and Festival International du Film de Femmes de Salé.

== Awards and nominations ==
Year	Award	Category	Film/TV Show	Result
2010	Golden Arena	Golden Arena for Best Actress	Mother of Asphalt	Won
2011	Shooting Stars Award	Best Actress	Mother of Asphalt	Won

== Filmography ==
=== Movie roles ===
Film
Year	Title	Role	Notes
2000	Ništa od sataraša	konobarica	
2000	Cashier Wants to Go to the Seaside	Cashier at the seaside	
2000	Pos'o je dobar, a para laka		
2001	Go, Yellow	Kruno's friend	
2002	God Forbid a Worse Thing Should Happen	Cashier	
2004	The Society of Jesus	sluškinja #1	
2004	100 Minutes of Glory	čobanica	
2004	A Wonderful Night in Split	Maja	
2004	Sorry for Kung Fu	rodilja #1	
2004	Nije bed		
2005	What Is a Man Without a Moustache?	Ljubica	
2005	Mrtvi kutovi	Lea	
2006	Das Fräulein	Ana	Winner of Heart of Sarajevo
2006	The Biggest Mistake of Albert Einstein	Andreja	
2007	Pravo čudo	Sister	
2007	Kradljivac uspomena		
2008	Behind the Glass	Maja's sister	
2009	Zagrebačke priče		
2009	In the Land of Wonders	Aunt	
2009	Čovjek ispod stola	Jasna	
2010	Mother of Asphalt	Mare	Winner of Pula Film Festival
2010	Shahada	Leyla	German film
2011	Bella Biondina	Tonka	
2011	Visoka modna napetost		
2011	Blurs	Nurse	
2012	Cvjetni trg	Irena	
2013	The Priest's Children	Marta	Croatian comedy film
2020	Breasts		
2024	Cat's Cry (Mačji krik)	Nadia Petric	
2024	My Late Summer	Lawyer Matković	
2026	Small Things	Anica	

=== Television roles ===
Film
Year	Title	Role	Notes
2002	Novo doba		
2005-2006	Bumerang	Irena	
2007	Operacija Kajman	Tonkica	
2008	Bitange i princeze	pregnant woman	
2008	Mamutica	Suzana	
2009	Odmori se, zaslužio si	Lucija	1 episode
2011-2012	Provodi i sprovodi	Nicky Valentina	
2017	"Gomorrah"	Branka	
