= Vjekoslav Vrdoljak =

Croatian cinematographer

- Born: 28 August 1954 (age 71); Zagreb, Yugoslavia (present-day Croatia)
- Occupation: Cinematographer
- Years active: 1988–present

Vjekoslav Vrdoljak (born 28 August 1954, in Zagreb) is a Croatian cinematographer, son of film director Antun Vrdoljak.

Vrdoljak had studied philosophy and comparative literature at the University of Zagreb Faculty of Humanities and Social Sciences before graduating from the Zagreb Academy of Dramatic Arts' cinematography department in 1981. At first he worked as a photo reporter and then moved on to filmmaking, assisting other cinematographers. His first major work was his father's 1988 film The Glembays.

This was followed by Krsto Papić's film Story from Croatia and Dejan Šorak's The Time of Warriors in 1991. He went on to work with other notable Croatian directors such as Jakov Sedlar, Vicko Ruić and Branko Schmidt in the 1990s, until working with his father again on Long Dark Night (Duga mračna noć) in 2004. After that he filmed several other award-winning feature films in the 2000s, along with a number of television documentaries.

Vrdoljak won three Golden Arena for Best Cinematography awards at the 1996, 1999 and 2005 editions of the Pula Film Festival, the Croatian national film awards.

== Selected filmography ==
- The Glembays (Glembajevi, 1988)
- Story from Croatia (Priča iz Hrvatske, 1991)
- The Time of Warriors (Vrijeme ratnika, 1991)
- Gospa (1995)
- Nausikaya (Nausikaja, 1996)
- Long Dark Night (Duga mračna noć, 2004)
- The Melon Route (Put lubenica, 2006)
