= Square of Violence =

1961 film by Leonardo Bercovici

- Theatrical release poster
- Directed by: Leonardo Bercovici
- Written by: Eric Bercovici; Leonardo Bercovici
- Produced by: Leonardo Bercovici; Aleksandar Sekulović
- Starring: Broderick Crawford; Valentina Cortese; Branko Pleša; Bibi Andersson; Anita Björk
- Cinematography: Aleksandar Sekulovic
- Edited by: Roberto Cinquini; Olga Skrigin
- Music by: Dusan Radic
- Production company: Lovcen Film
- Distributed by: Metro-Goldwyn-Mayer
- Release dates: July 26, 1961 (Yugoslavia); December 8, 1963 (United States)
- Running time: 96 minutes
- Countries: United States; Yugoslavia
- Language: English

Square of Violence is a 1961 drama film directed by Leonardo Bercovici and written by Eric Bercovici and Leonardo Bercovici. The film, shot in Yugoslavia, stars Broderick Crawford, Valentina Cortese, Branko Pleša, Bibi Andersson and Anita Björk. The film was released on July 7, 1961, by Metro-Goldwyn-Mayer.

== Plot ==
Set in Italy, the story takes place in this very country, during WW2, where German occupation army ruled everything, just before the allied forces came, in 1944. Crawford plays here a doctor whose son has been shot by the Germans. Of course he has no more taste in life. He continues his work as a German officers' physician. One day, he throws a bomb just in the middle of German troops. Many soldiers and officers are killed. Some time later, the lead officer of the Nazis troops suspects the doctor to be the responsible of the explosion. He lets him know that he himself knows.

== Cast ==
- Broderick Crawford as Dr. Stefan Bernardi
- Valentina Cortese as Erica Bernardi
- Branko Plesa as Major Kohler
- Bibi Andersson as Maria
- Anita Björk as Sophia
- Bert Sotlar as Partisan Leader
- Dragomir Felba as Serafin
- Viktor Starcic as German Commandant
- Nikola Simic as Radio Operator

Yugoslav People's Army and Captain First Class Dragiša Blagojevic

== Production ==
The film was shot in Novi Sad, Yugoslavia (modern day Serbia). The titular square is the Freedom Square in Stari Grad neighborhood, one of the most visited tourist spots in the city. The statue of Svetozar Miletić was obscured to have an appearance of an obelisk with a swastika on it.
