= Ljubljana International Film Festival =

Film festival in Ljubljana, Slovenia

The Ljubljana International Film Festival (also known as LIFFe) is an international film festival established in 1990 and held annually in Ljubljana, Slovenia.

Apart from screenings of Slovenian films, it also regularly features renowned authors' film retrospectives, international independent film programmes and a short films competition.

== Awards ==
Awards presented at the most recent 2007 edition were as follows:

- The Kingfisher Award for best debut or second film by up-and-coming directors
- The Golden Reel Award (Audience Award) for best film overall, as voted by audiences
- The FIPRESCI Award, given by an international film critics' jury
- The Amnesty International Slovenia Award for best film that deals with a theme related to human rights issues

== Award winners ==
=== Kingfisher Award ===
Year	English Title	Original Title	Director
1996	Living in Oblivion		Tom DiCillo
1997	East Palace, West Palace	Dōng gōng xī gōng	Zhang Yuan
1998	The Dreamlife of Angels	La Vie rêvée des anges	Erick Zonca
1999	Beshkempir		Aktan Abdykalykov
2000	East Is East		Damien O'Donnell
2001	Bread and Milk	Kruh in mleko	Jan Cvitkovič
2002	Saturday	Sábado	Juan Villegas
2003	The Return	Vozvrashcheniye	Andrey Zvyagintsev
2004	Somersault		Cate Shortland
2005	Dark Horse	Voksne mennesker	Dagur Kári
2006	1:1		Annette K. Olesen
2007	Windows on Monday	Montag kommen die Fenster	Ulrich Köhler
2008	Hunger		Steve McQueen
2009	The Blacks	Crnci	Goran Dević, Zvonimir Jurić
2010	Dogtooth	Kynodontas	Yorgos Lanthimos
2011	Take Shelter		Jeff Nichols
2012	Clip	Klip	Maja Miloš
2013	Miele		Valeria Golino
2014	Goodnight Mommy	Ich seh, Ich seh	Veronika Franz and Severin Fiala
2015	Rams	Hrútar	Grímur Hákonarson
2016	A Good Wife	Dobra žena	Mirjana Karanović
2017	Columbus		Kogonada
2018	Woman at War	Kona fer í stríð	Benedikt Erlingsson
2019	Beanpole	Dylda	Kantemir Balagov
2020	Mila	Apples	Christos Nikou
2021	Hit the Road	Jadde Khaki	Panah Panahi
2022	Safe Place	Sigurno mjesto	Juraj Lerotić
2023	Three Thousand Numbered Pieces	Háromezer számozott darab	Ádám Császi
2024	Lesson Learned	Fekete pont	Bálint Szimler
2025	Blue Heron		Sophy Romvari

=== By Year ===
2007 LIFFe

Award	Film	Director
Kingfisher Award	Windows on Monday (Montag kommen die Fenster)	(Germany) Ulrich Köhler
Golden Reel Award	Empties (Vratné lahve)	(Czech Republic) Jan Svěrák
FIPRESCI Award	Just About Love? (Et toi t'es sur qui?)	(France) Lola Doillon
Amnesty International; Slovenia Award	XXY	(Argentina) Lucía Puenzo

2008 LIFFe

Award	Film	Director
Kingfisher Award	Hunger	(United Kingdom) Steve McQueen
FIPRESCI Prize	Ballast	(United States) Lance Hamer
Dragon Audience Award	Katyn	(Poland) Andrzej Wajda

2012 LIFFe

Award	Film	Director
Kingfisher Award	Clip (Klip)	(Serbia) Maja Miloš
Dragon Audience Award	Lore (Lore)	(Australia) Cate Shortland
FIPRESCI Award	Sister (L'Enfant d'en haut)	(France) Ursula Meier
Best Short Film Award	Tuba Atlantic	(Norway) Hallvar Witzo
