= The Spider (short story) =

1908 short story by Hanns Heinz Ewers

- Short story by Hanns Heinz Ewers
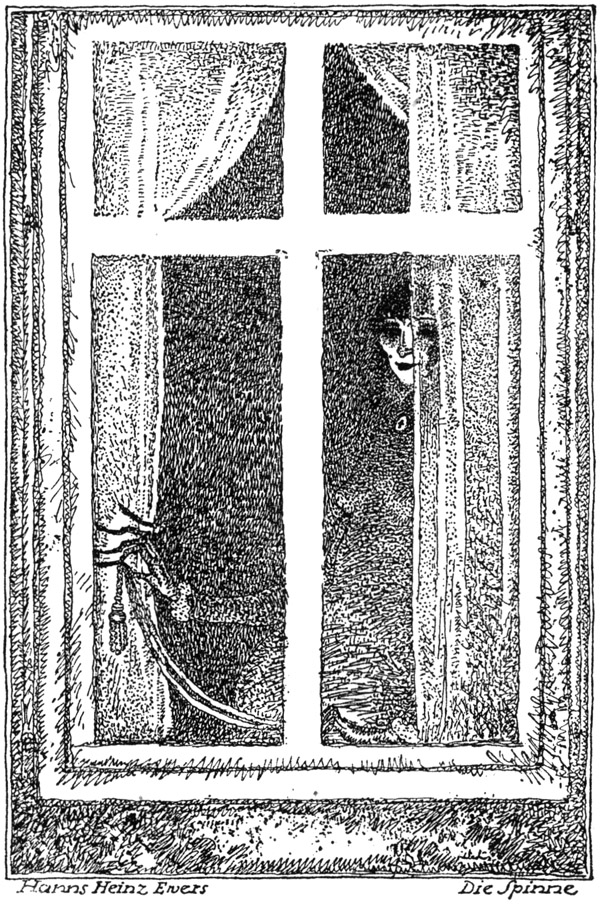
- Illustration by Paul Scheurich
- Original title: Die Spinne
- Country: Germany
- Language: German
- Genre: horror

Publication
- Published in: Zeitgeist
- Publisher: Mosse-Verlag
- Publication date: 9 November 1908
- Published in English: December 1915

"The Spider" (German: Die Spinne) is a 1908 horror short story by the German writer Hanns Heinz Ewers. It tells the story of a student who investigates a series of mysterious deaths in a Paris hotel room. It is Ewers' most famous story.

== Plot ==
The medical student Richard Bracquemont moves into room number seven of a small hotel in Paris, curious because the three previous residents ended up hanging themselves in identical ways at the same time of the day. Richard is supposed to write a report about the room and keep regular contact with the hotel manager and a police inspector. He learns that none of the previous residents seemed suicidal, and after their deaths, a spider was seen crawling out of their mouths.

As days pass and nothing seems out of the ordinary, Richard becomes more interested in a curious woman he sees spinning threads in a window across the street. He calls her Clarimonde and they develop a game where she rapidly replicates any movement Richard does at the window. As they continue their silent game over a few weeks, Richard gradually falls in love with her.

By the time Richard realises that Clarimonde is not replicating his movements, but rather controls them, he is too obsessed with her to stop going to the window each day. Clarimonde eventually ties a curtain cord into a noose, indicating that Richard should replicate her movements and hang himself. He tries to fight the urge to follow her. The police inspector finds Richard dead with a crushed spider next to his body. He reads Richard's journal but finds the flat across the street to be empty and without any sign of activity.

== Publication ==
"The Spider" was published in Zeitgeist, the cultural supplement of the Berliner Tageblatt, on 9 and 16 November 1908. Ewers received 150 mark for it. It was included in Ewers' 1909 short story collection Die Besessenen. Frequently anthologized, "The Spider" was illustrated by Paul Scheurich for Georg Müller Verlag's Das Gespensterbuch, first published in 1913.

An English translation of "The Spider" first appeared in the December 1915 issue of The International. It was included in the 1931 anthology Creeps by Night edited by Dashiell Hammett, which was republished in the United Kingdom in 1932 as Modern Tales of Horror.

== Reception ==
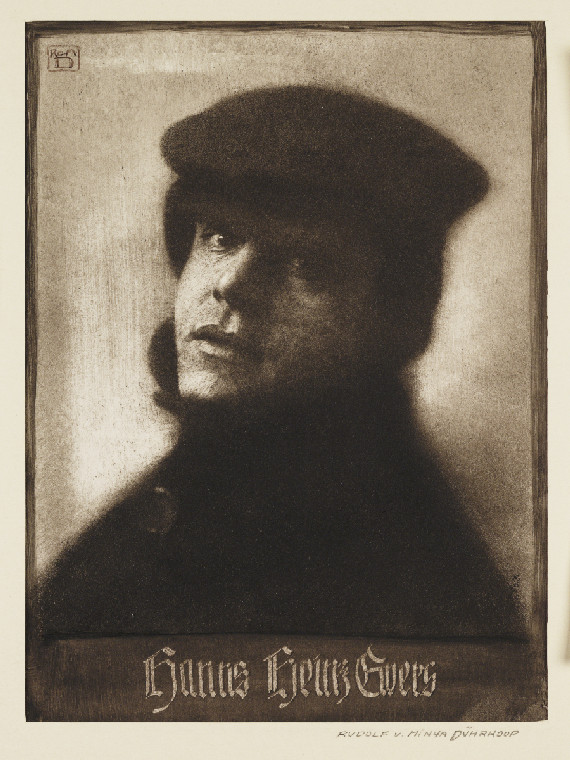
Ewers circa 1907

"The Spider" is Ewers' most famous story. Upon the original publication, Zeitgeist received around 500 letters from readers who asked for explanations of the story. Two letters accused Ewers of having plagiarised the story "L'Œil invisible" (1859) by Erckmann-Chatrian. Ewers responded in Zeitgeist on 7 December 1908 that he never had read anything by Erckmann-Chatrian before, but had sought out the story and concluded it must be inspired by the same real case that he drew from in "The Spider".

== Legacy ==
The American writer H. P. Lovecraft used many details from "The Spider" in the surface plot of his 1935 short story "The Haunter of the Dark". The Spanish writer Javier Fernández Sánchez used "The Spider" as the starting point for his 2005 novel Cero absoluto.

"The Spider" was the basis for the 1995 Croatian film Nausikaya directed by Vicko Ruić. It was adapted into the comic "The Spider" written by Jose Luis Bueno Piña and illustrated by El Compostelo, published online in 2017.

== See also ==
- Arachne
