= Livaković =

Livaković (Croatian pronunciation: [liʋǎːkoʋitɕ]) is a Croatian surname. Notable people with the surname include:

- Dominik Livaković (born 1995), Croatian footballer
- Nada Gačešić-Livaković (born 1951), Croatian actress
