= Serafim, the Lighthouse Keeper's Son =

- Directed by: Vicko Ruić
- Written by: Vicko Ruić
- Starring: Vjekoslav Janković; Barbara Prpić; Ivo Gregurević; Vanja Drach; Nada Gačešić-Livaković; Mia Begović
- Cinematography: Silvio Jesenković
- Music by: Vlatko Stefanovski
- Release date: 22 July 2002
- Running time: 103 minutes
- Country: Croatia
- Language: Croatian

Serafim, the Lighthouse Keeper's Son (Croatian: Serafin, svjetioničarev sin) is a 2002 Croatian feature film directed by Vicko Ruić, based on the 1922 novel Bauk written by Ulderiko Donadini.
