= Extracurricular (film) =

2019 film

- Film poster
- Directed by: Ivan-Goran Vitez
- Written by: Ivan-Goran Vitez
- Produced by: Ivan Maloca; Maja Vukic
- Starring: Milivoj Beader
- Cinematography: Lutvo Mekic
- Edited by: Ivana Rogic
- Music by: Jelenko Hodak
- Production company: Inter Film
- Release date: 19 July 2019
- Running time: 101 minutes
- Country: Croatia
- Language: Croatian

Extracurricular (Croatian: Dopunska nastava) is a 2019 Croatian crime comedy thriller film written and directed by Ivan-Goran Vitez. It was selected as the Croatian entry for the Best International Feature Film at the 93rd Academy Awards, but it was not nominated.

== Plot ==
A recently divorced father is told he can't see his nine-year-old daughter on her birthday, so he holds her classroom hostage with a gun and a birthday cake.

== Cast ==
- Milivoj Beader as Vlado Mladinić
- Zlatko Burić as Drago
- Marko Cindrić as Ozren
- Filip Eldan as Goran Varga
- Frida Jakšić as Ana Mladinić
- Darko Janeš as Načelnik Gudelj

== See also ==
- List of submissions to the 93rd Academy Awards for Best International Feature Film
- List of Croatian submissions for the Academy Award for Best International Feature Film
