= Slava Raškaj =

Croatian artist (1877–1906)

- Photograph of Slava Raškaj
- Born: Slavomira Friderika Olga Raškaj; 2 January 1877; Ozalj, Croatia-Slavonia, Austria-Hungary
- Died: 29 March 1906 (aged 29); Zagreb, Croatia-Slavonia, Austria-Hungary
- Known for: Painting

Slava Raškaj (pronounced [slǎːʋa rǎʃkaj]; 2 January 1877 – 29 March 1906) was a Croatian painter, considered to be the greatest Croatian watercolorist of the late 19th and early 20th century. Deaf since birth, Raškaj was schooled in Vienna and Zagreb, where her mentor was the renowned Croatian painter Bela Čikoš Sesija. In the 1890s her works were exhibited around Europe, including at the 1900 Expo in Paris. In her twenties Raškaj was diagnosed with acute depression and was institutionalised for the last three years of her life before dying in 1906 from tuberculosis in Zagreb. The value of her work was largely overlooked by art historians in the following decades, but in the late 1990s and early 2000s interest in her work was revived.

== Biography ==
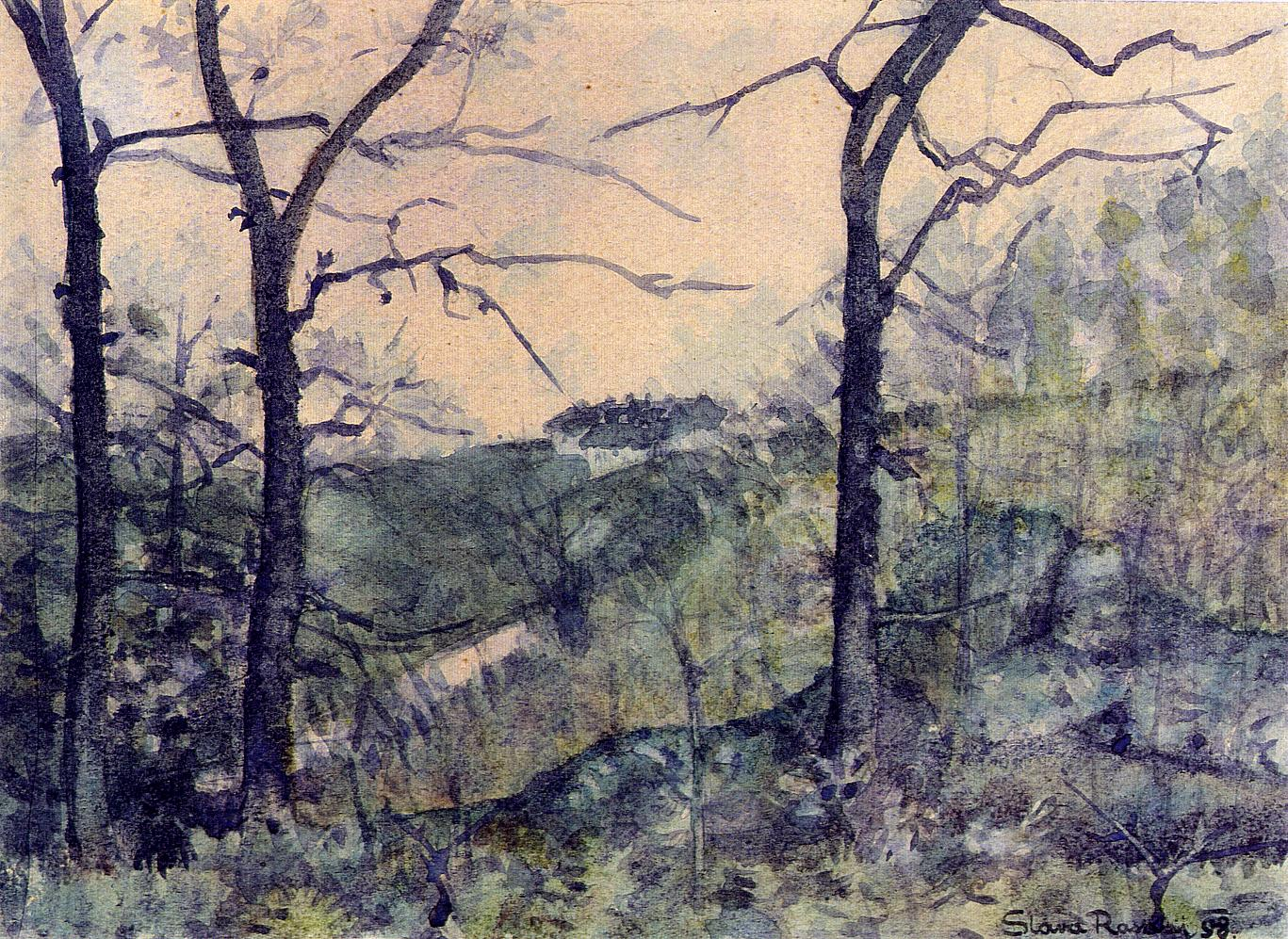
A view of Ozalj (1898)

Slava was born as Slavomira Friderika Olga Raškaj on 2 January 1877 into a middle class family (her mother Olga ran the local post office which was at the time a prestigious administrative position) in the town of Ozalj in present-day Croatia (at the time in the Kingdom of Croatia-Slavonia, a subdivision within Austria-Hungary). Olga liked painting in her free time and she passed her love for arts very early on to both her daughters Slava and Paula (Paula later worked as a schoolteacher in Orahovica and also continued to paint casually in adulthood).

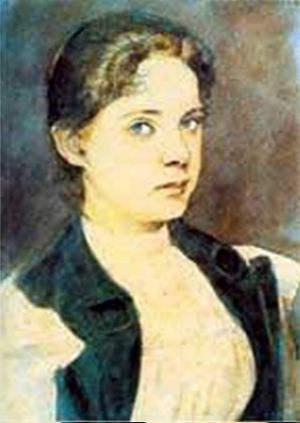
Self-portrait (1898)

When she was eight, Slava was sent to Vienna to enroll at a school for deaf people where she first learned to draw. Her drawings from that period mainly depict casts of classical sculptures drawn in pencil or ink (two of these drawings survived and are kept on display at the Croatian School Museum at Republic of Croatia Square in Zagreb). During her time in Vienna she also learned German and French and in later years moved on to watercolor and gouache techniques before returning to Ozalj in 1893.

Upon her return, the local schoolteacher Ivan Muha-Otoić noticed her artistic talent and urged her parents to send her to Zagreb for further art instructions at the renowned painter Vlaho Bukovac's atelier in 1895 (as Bukovac was a friend of Muha-Otoić). Once in Zagreb, Bukovac refused to help her but then Bela Čikoš Sesija took her in and began instructing her in his own studio in 1896. She spent the next few years working with Sesija - she lived at what was then the State Institute for Deaf-mute Children (Zemaljski zavod za odgoj gluhonijeme djece) on Ilica Street, and she used a local morgue as her studio (in the meantime her former teacher from Ozalj Ivan Muha-Otoić became director of the Institute in 1895).

Raškaj's repertoire was peculiar at the time - she painted somewhat macabre paintings of still life, watercolors with unusual objects such as a starfish, a silver jewelry chest, and even more interesting, pairs of objects such as a red rose and an owl, or a lobster and a fan.

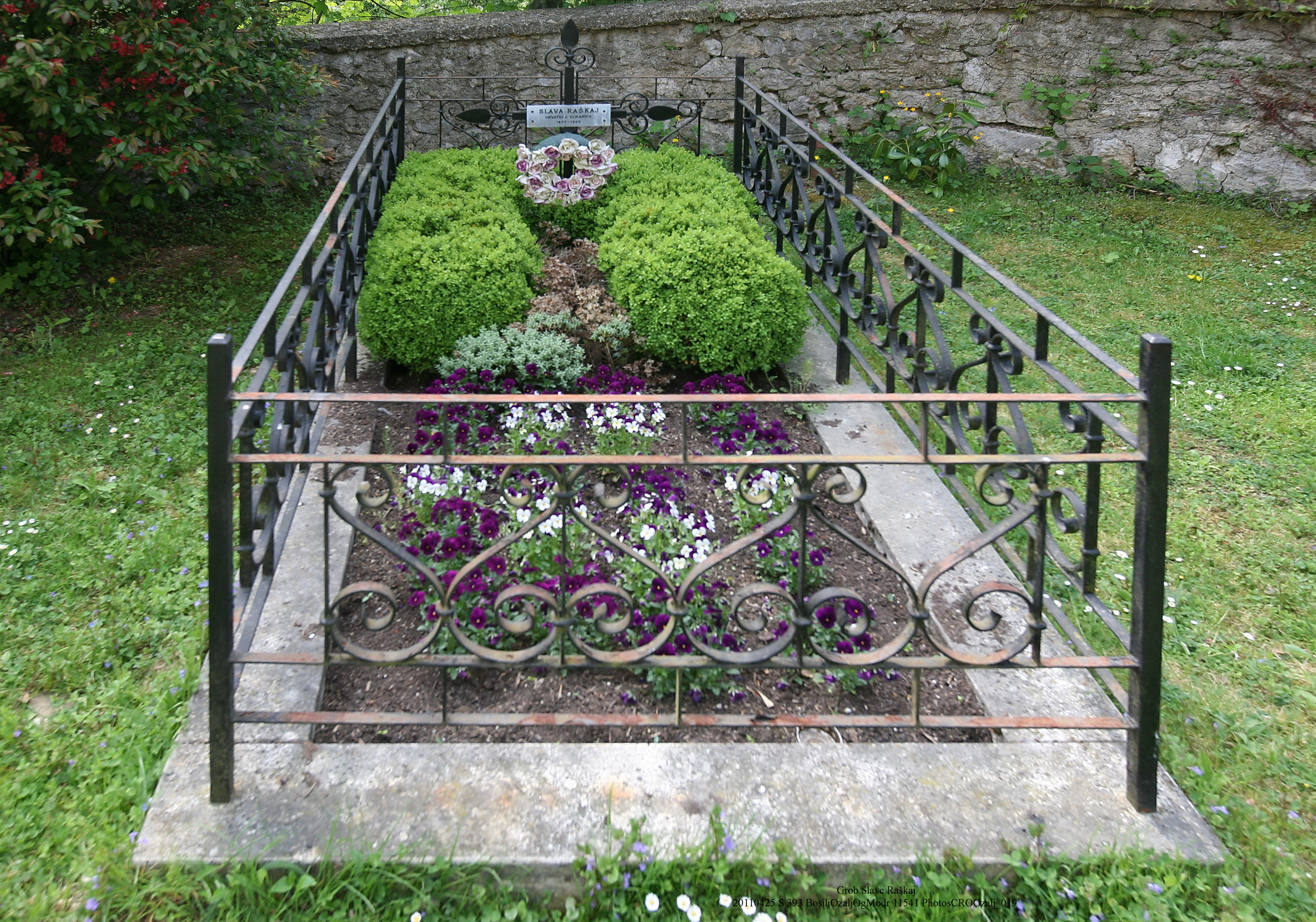
Slava Raškaj's grave in Ozalj

In the late 1890s she started painting en plein air, depicting outdoor scenes from the Zagreb Botanical Garden, Maksimir Park and other parks in the city, featuring somewhat lighter tones and colors. In 1899 she returned to her hometown of Ozalj and continued to paint outdoors, which was also unusual at the time. Her most valuable paintings were all created in the 1890s, including works such as Self-portrait, Spring in Ozalj, The Old Mill and others. Her works were first publicly exhibited at the Art Pavilion in Zagreb soon after it opened in 1898, where six of her watercolors were presented along with the works of renowned painters such as Menci Klement Crnčić and Vlaho Bukovac. Her paintings were also exhibited in Saint Petersburg, in Moscow and at the Exposition Universelle in Paris in 1900, where five of her paintings were shown.

In 1900 first symptoms of depression began to appear. She was hospitalised but soon after that she was released for home care. However, her condition deteriorated further and Slava was eventually institutionalised at a psychiatric hospital in Stenjevec in 1902. She completely stopped painting in her last years, and died on 29 March 1906 from tuberculosis.

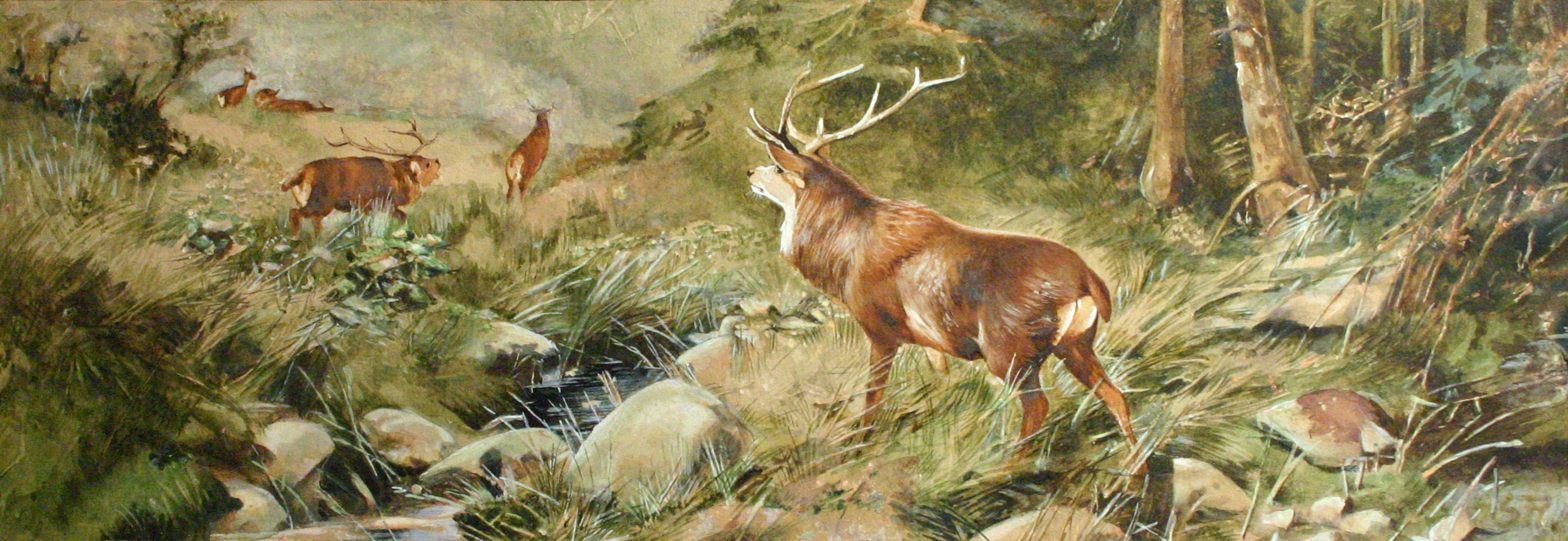
Deer on the battlefield

== Legacy ==
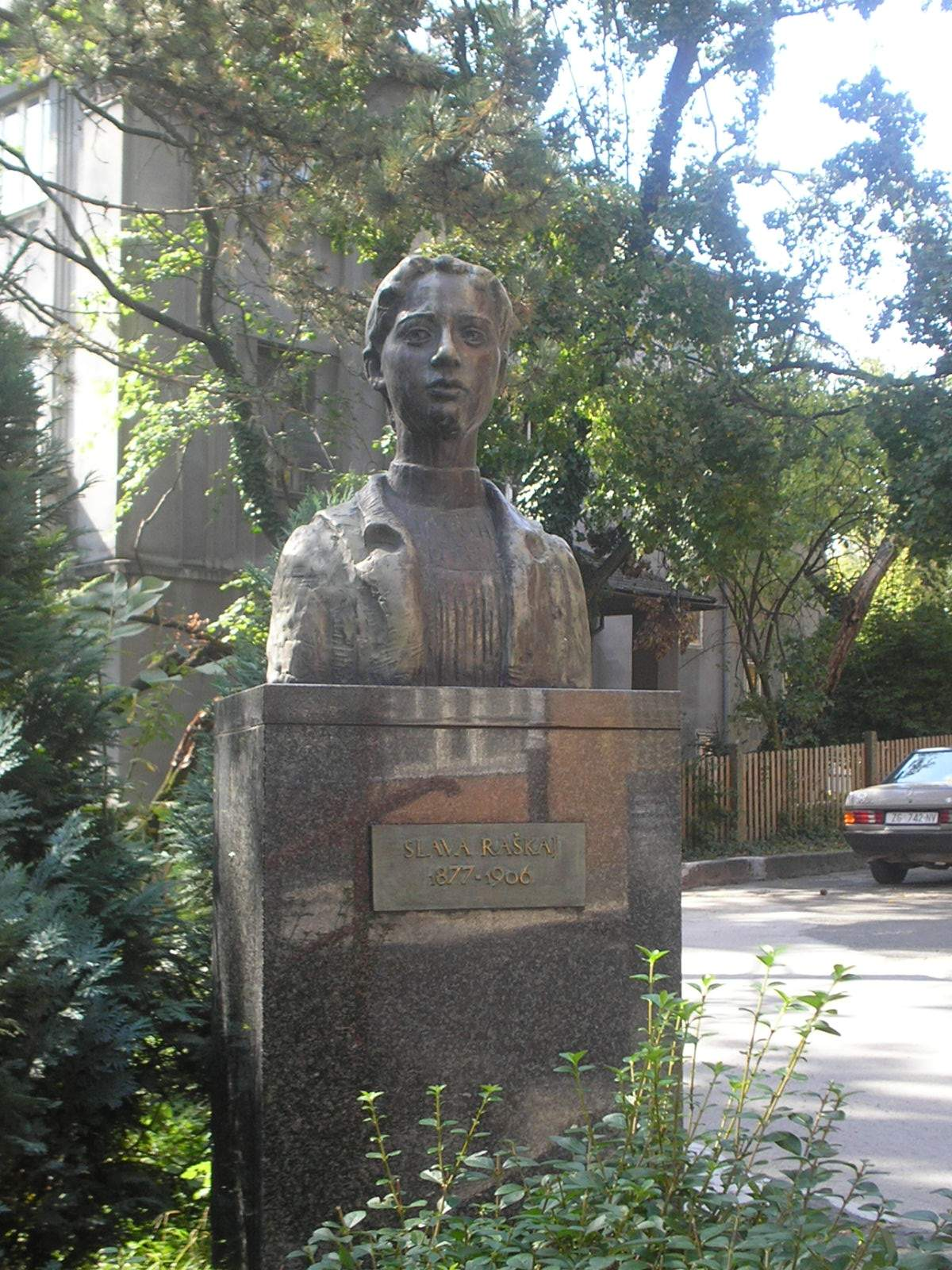
Slava Raškaj's bust in Zagreb

The first exhibition dedicated to her work took place in 1957 in Zagreb. Her impressionist watercolors painted after 1900 are considered among the best of Croatian art.

A Croatian film about her controversial relationship with Sesija titled 100 Minutes of Glory directed by Dalibor Matanić was released in 2004, and a grand retrospective exhibition featuring 185 of her works opened at the Klovićevi Dvori Gallery in Zagreb between May and August 2008.

In December 2000 the Croatian National Bank issued a silver commemorative coin depicting Slava Raškaj, in their Famous Croatian Women series (Znamenite Hrvatice), along with children's writer Ivana Brlić-Mažuranić and the 17th-century noblewoman Katarina Zrinska.

The Slava Raškaj Educational Centre, in Zagreb, specializes in inclusive practical and vocational education for deaf students and those with communication impairments.

== Selected works ==
- “Stablo u snijegu” (Tree in the snow)
- “Rano proljeće” (Early spring)
- “Proljeće u Ozlju” (Spring in Ozalj)
- “Zimski pejsaž” (Winter landscape)
- “Lopoči” (Water lilies)

== Gallery ==
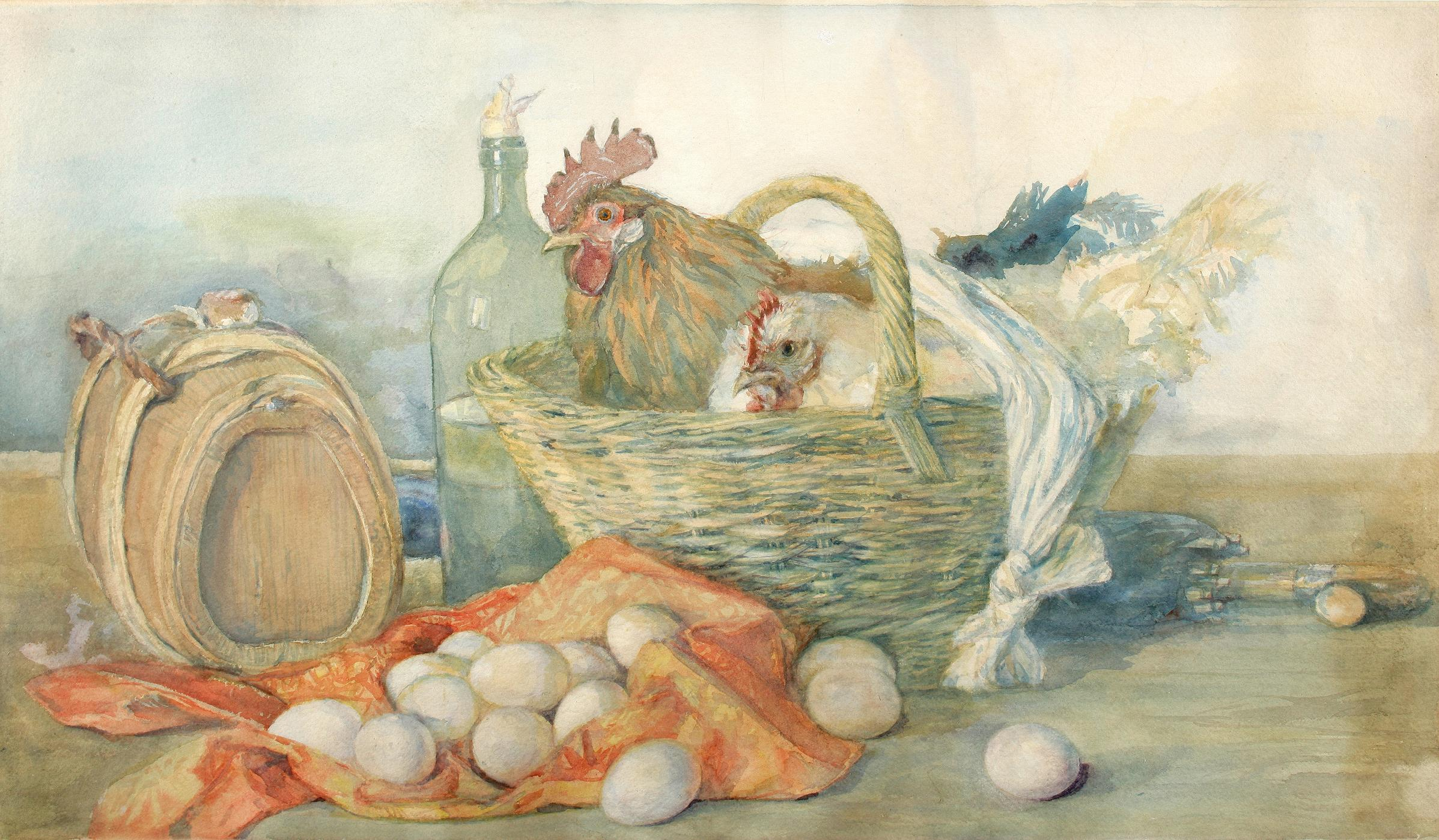
Yellow Rooster and White Chicken

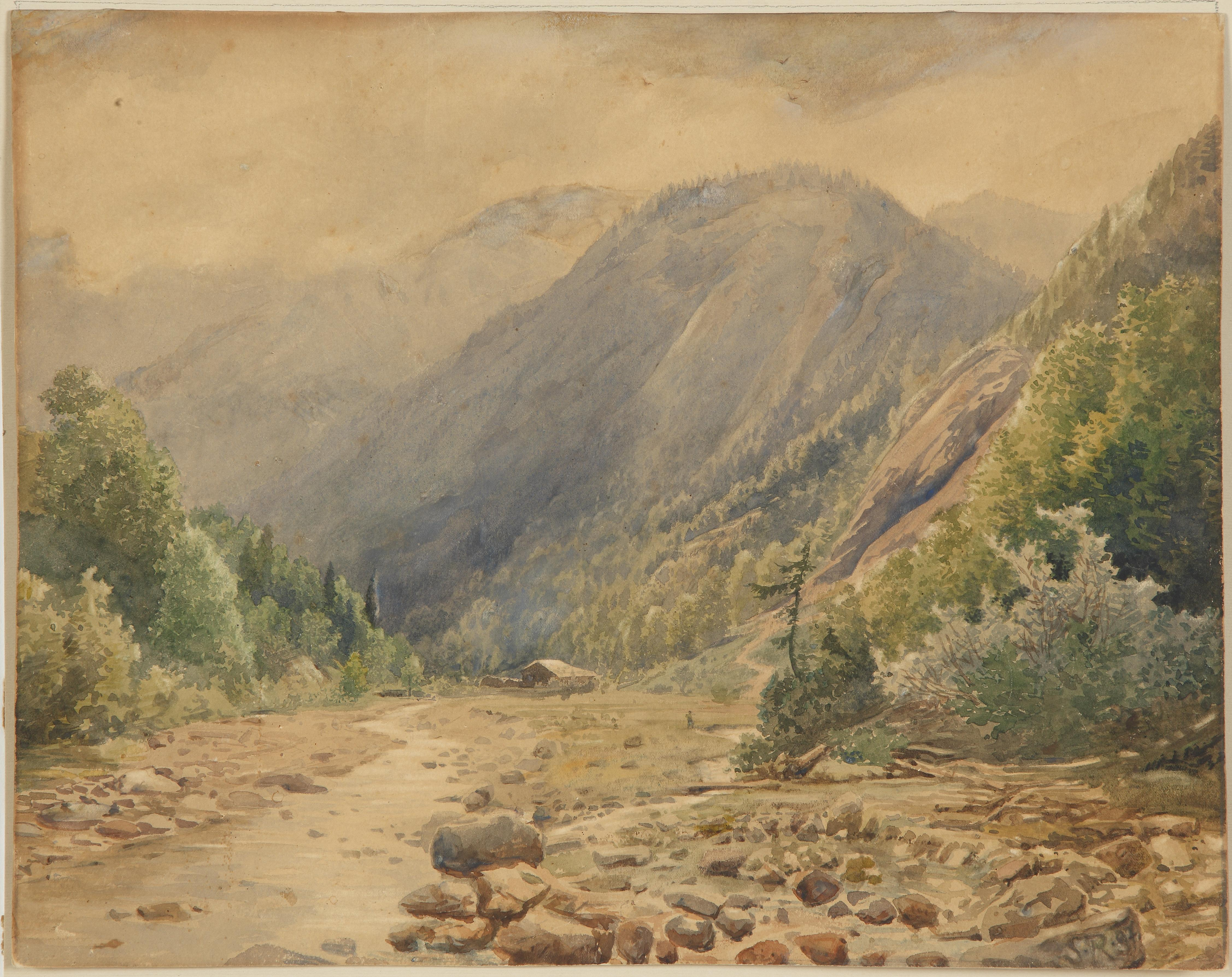
Rainy Day in Samobor Hills

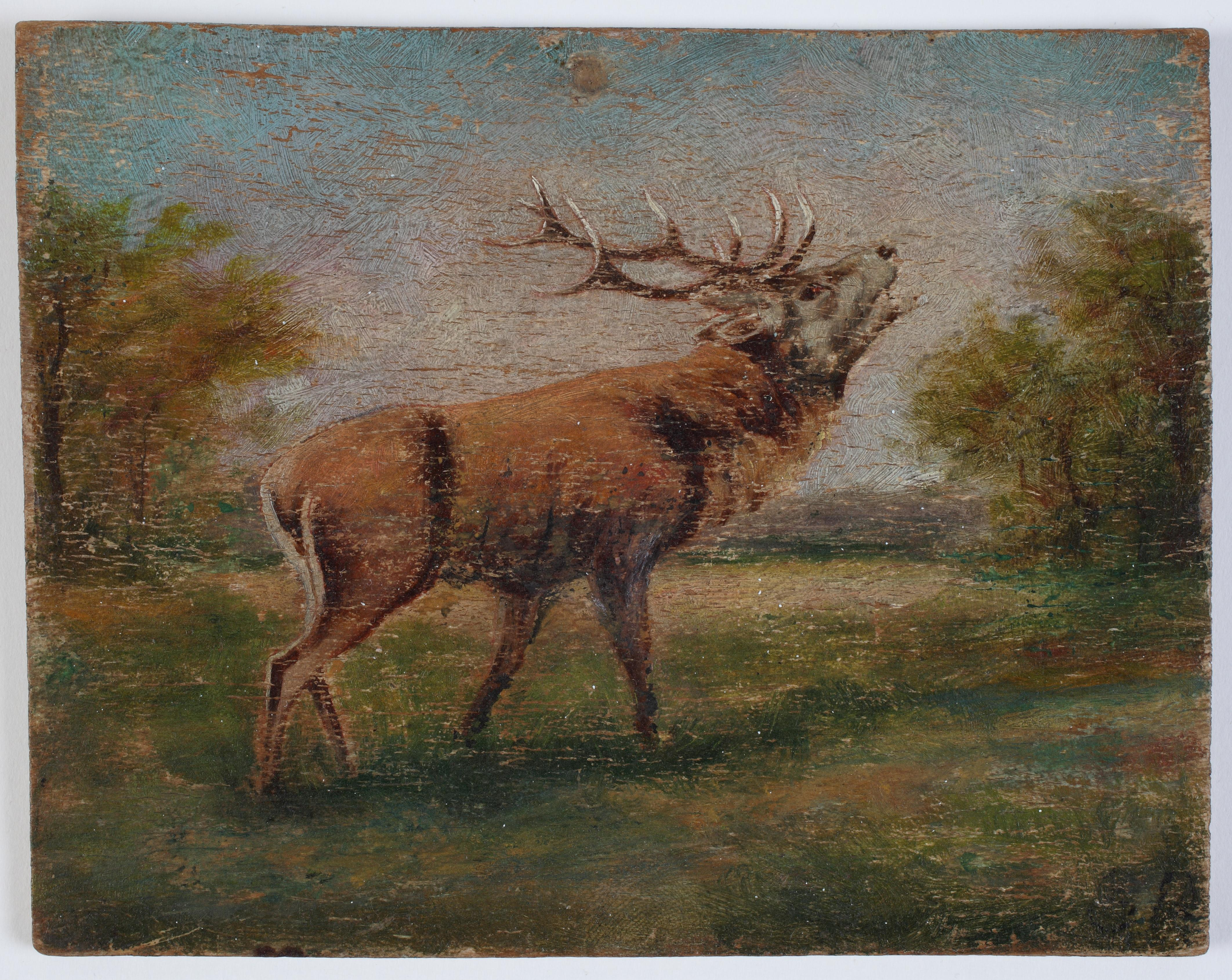
Study of Deer

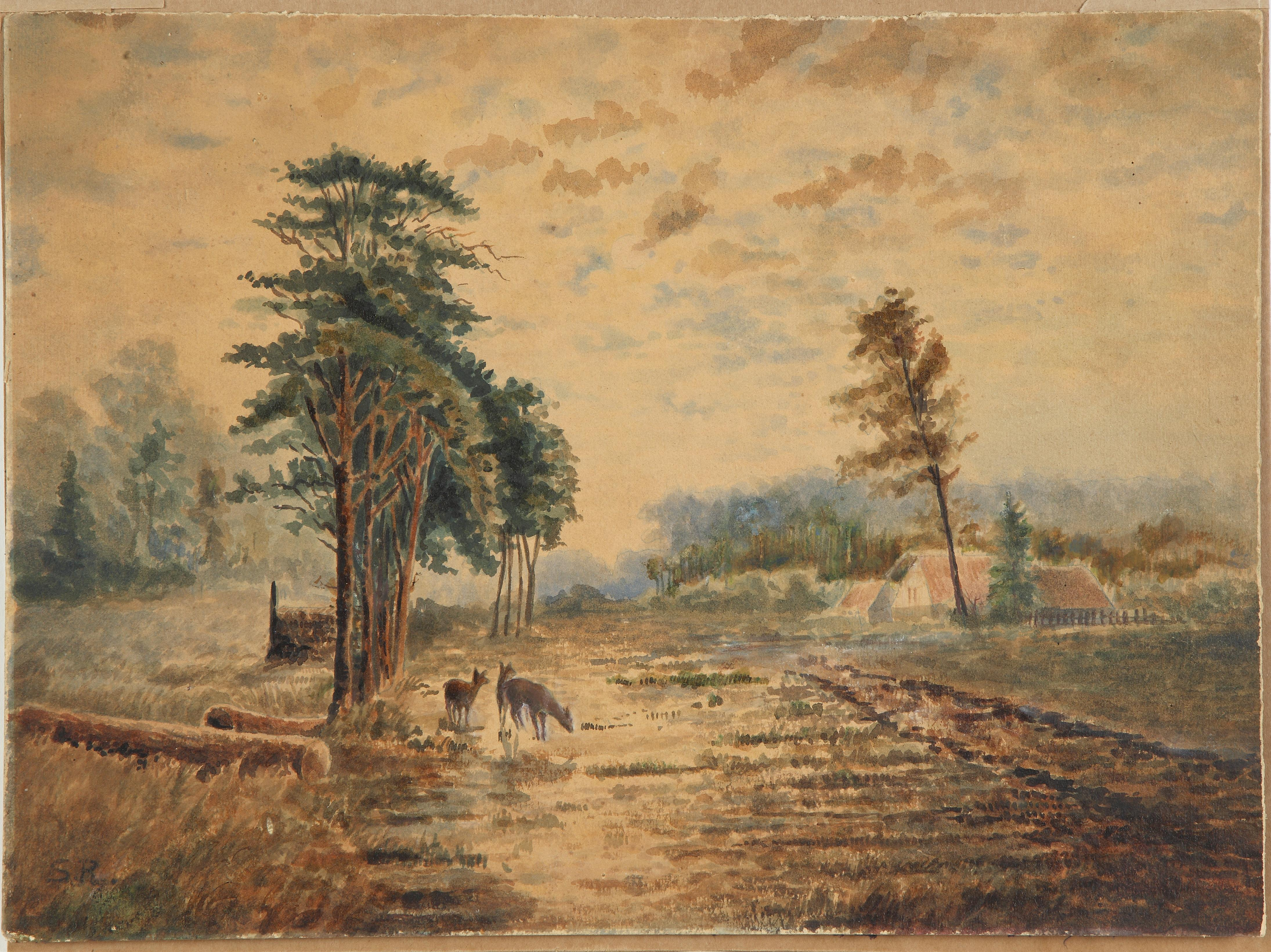
Three Deer Near the Settlement

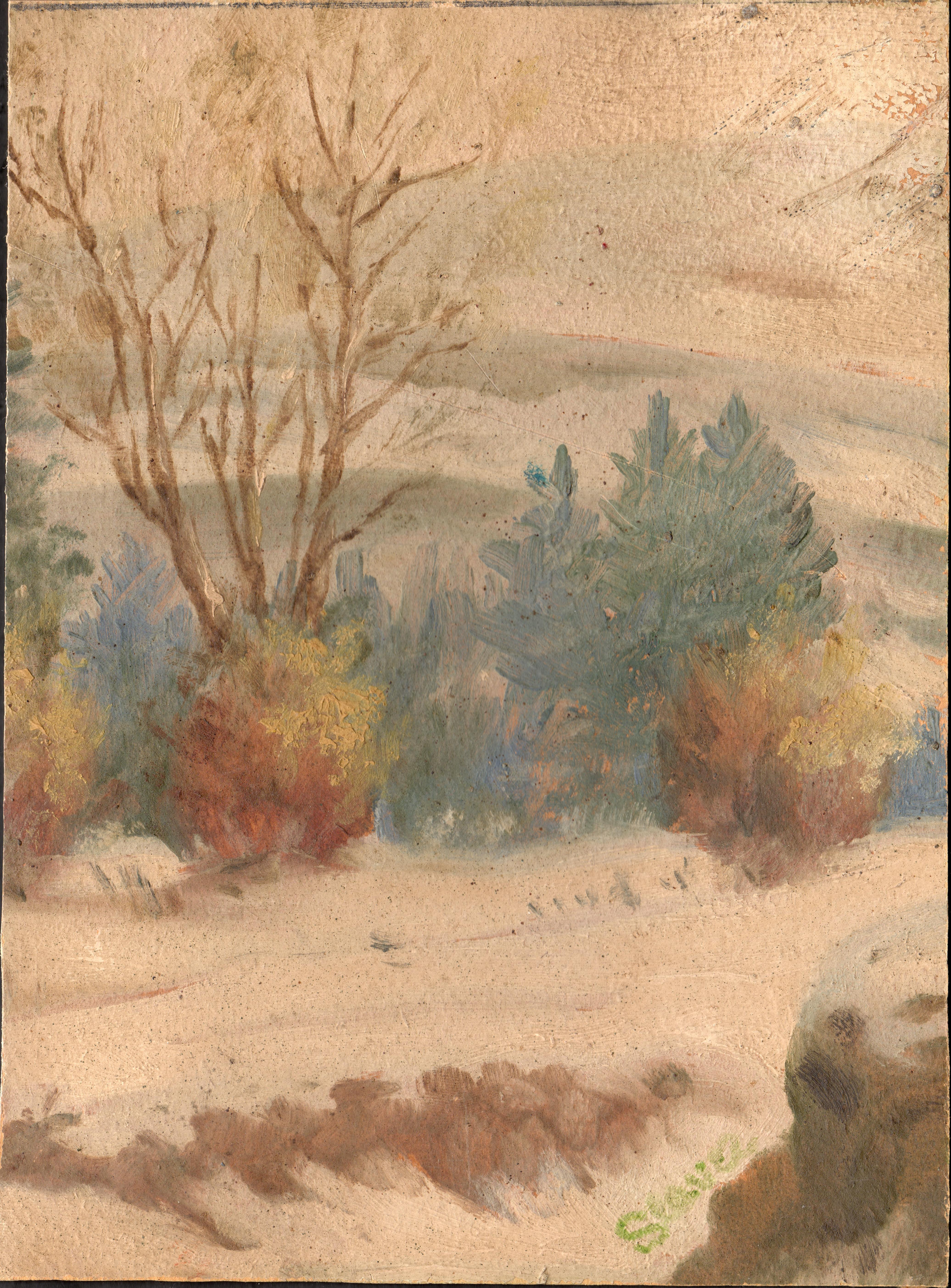
The Slope of Hills in Winter

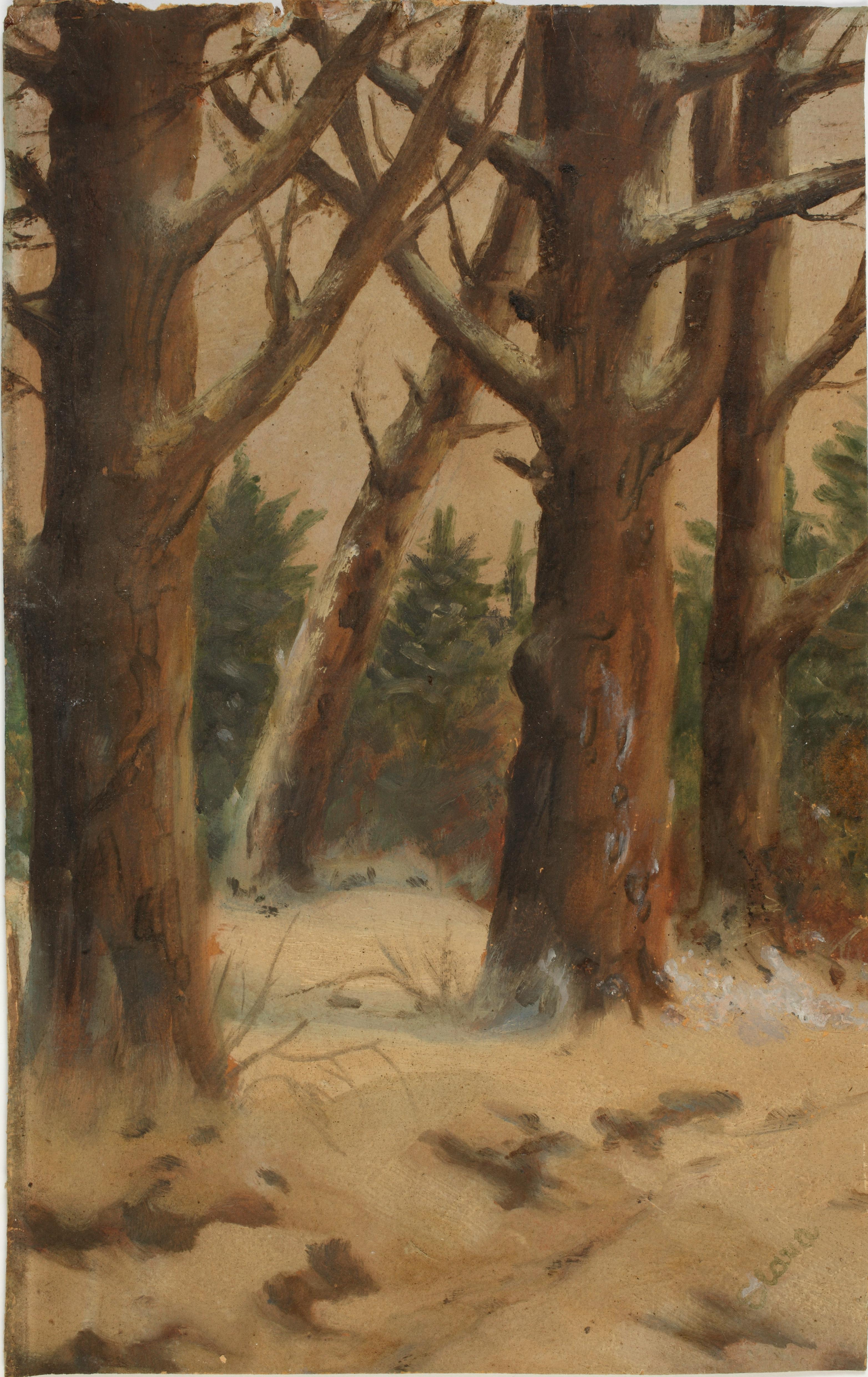
The Forest in Winter

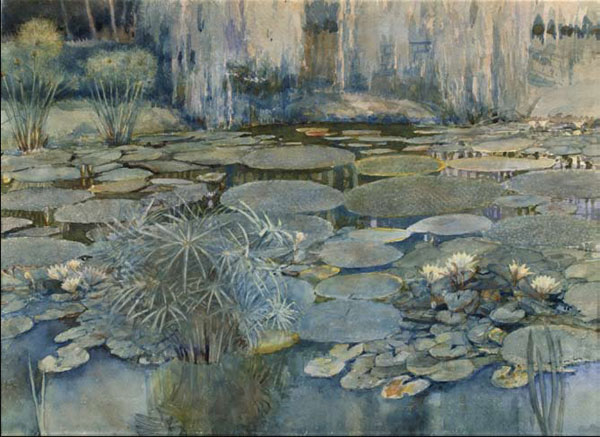
Lilies

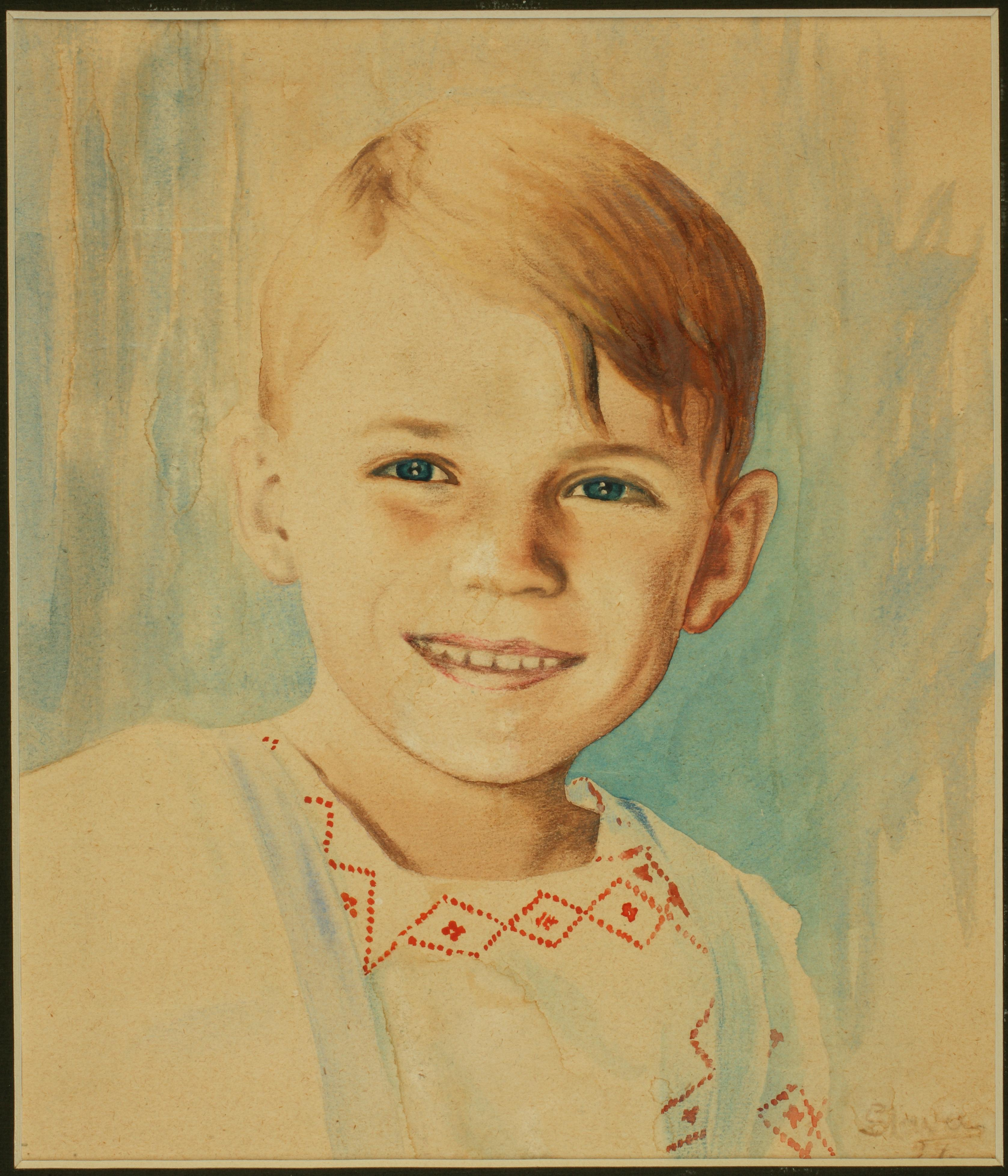
Vera Papić

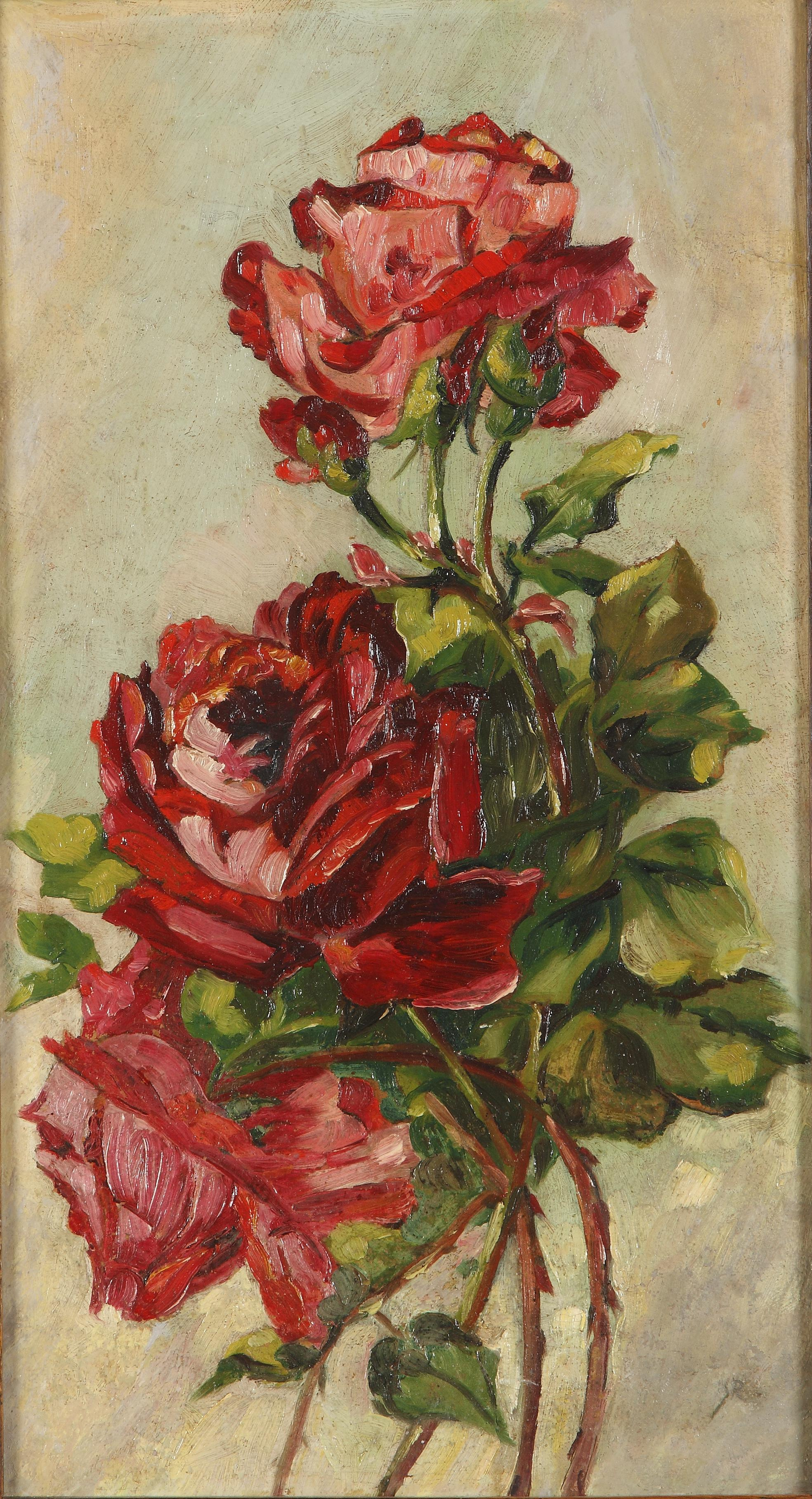
Bloody Roses for Hannibal

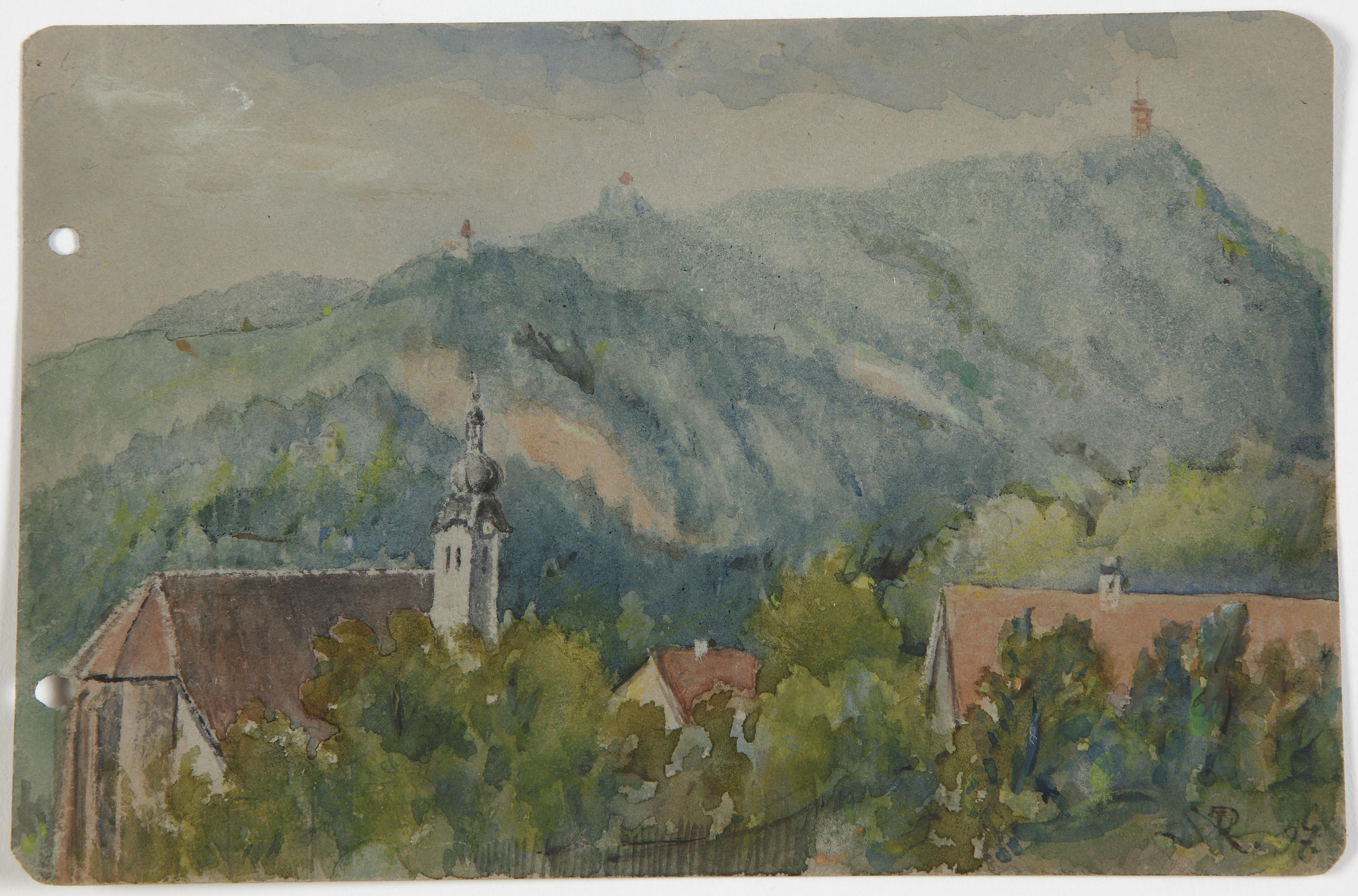
View from the Hill on Samobor
