= Kapo (1960 film) =

Kapò
- Italian film poster
- Directed by: Gillo Pontecorvo
- Screenplay by: Franco Solinas; Gillo Pontecorvo
- Produced by: Franco Cristaldi; Moris Ergas
- Starring: Susan Strasberg; Laurent Terzieff; Emmanuelle Riva; Didi Perego; Gianni Garko; Annabella Besi; Graziella Galvani
- Cinematography: Aleksandar Sekulović
- Edited by: Roberto Cinquini
- Music by: Carlo Rustichelli
- Production company: Cineriz; Vides Cinematografica; Zebra Films; Francinex; Lovcen Film
- Distributed by: Cineriz (Italy)
- Release dates: 7 September 1960 (Venice); 29 September 1960 (Italy); 22 November 1960 (Yugoslavia); 26 April 1961 (France)
- Running time: 116 minutes
- Countries: Italy; France; Yugoslavia
- Language: Italian

Kapò (Italian: [kaˈpɔ]) is a 1960 historical war drama film directed and co-written by Gillo Pontecorvo. It was one of the first narrative films to deal explicitly with the subject of the Holocaust, with graphic depictions of Nazi concentration camps which made it controversial at the time. A co-production of Italian, French, and Yugoslavian companies, the film stars American actress Susan Strasberg, along with Laurent Terzieff, Emmanuelle Riva, Didi Perego and Gianni Garko. The title refers to a prisoner functionary in the Nazi concentration camps.

The film premiered at the 21st Venice International Film Festival, and was released to Italian theatres on September 29, 1960. It received mixed reviews from critics. While some praised the filmmaking, others, particularly Jacques Rivette, criticized Pontecorvo's decision to dramatize the Holocaust, unprecedented at the time. In the United States, the film was nominated for the Academy Award for Best Foreign-Language Film.

The film paid for its cost in Italy alone.

== Plot ==
Edith, a naïve 14-year-old French Jew living in Paris, and her parents are sent to a concentration camp, where the latter are killed. Sofia, an older political prisoner, and a kindly camp doctor save her from a similar fate by giving her a new, non-Jewish identity, that of the newly dead Nicole Niepas.

As time goes by, she becomes hardened to the brutal life. She first sells her body to a German SS guard in return for food. She becomes fond of another guard, Karl. The fraternization helps her become a kapo, one of those put in charge of the other prisoners. She thrives while the idealistic Sofia grows steadily weaker.

When she falls in love with Sascha, a Russian prisoner of war, Edith is persuaded to play a crucial role in a mass escape, turning off the power. Most of the would-be escapees are killed, but some get away. Edith is not one of them. As she lies dying, she tells Karl, "They betrayed us, Karl, they betrayed both of us." She dies saying the traditional Jewish prayer Shema Yisrael.

== Cast ==
- Susan Strasberg as Edith / Nicole Niepas
- Laurent Terzieff as Sascha
- Emmanuelle Riva as Terese
- Didi Perego as Sofia
- Gianni Garko as Karl
- Annabella Besi as Carole
- Graziella Galvani as Isabelle
- Paola Pitagora as Georgette
- Dragomir Felba as Salomon Lejtman
- Dušan Perković as Commandant
- Mira Dinulović as Alisa
- Dirjana Dojić as Ninette
- Sima Janićijević as Doctor
- Eleonora Bellinzaghi
- Bruno Scipioni

== Production ==
Pontecorvo and his screenwriter Franco Solinas were inspired to make the film after reading Primo Levi's memoir If This Is a Man. The writing process was a tense one, as Pontecorvo and Solinas had contrasting ideas on what the film should be - Pontecorvo believed Solinas' script was too melodramatic and nearly broke off their partnership before the intervention of producer Franco Cristaldi. Pontecorvo also disliked the ending, having preferred Edith survive and contemplate her solitude and sense of complicity.

Claudia Cardinale was considered for the lead role before Susan Strasberg, who was known for playing Anne Frank in the Broadway play The Diary of Anne Frank, was cast. This later caused problem on set, because the American actress did not speak Italian, and Pontecorvo had to communicate with her through an interpreter.

Filming took place at Jadran Studios in Zagreb. The culture clash between the Italian and Yugoslavian crews also caused problems. Pontecorvo was forced to work with a Yugoslavian cinematographer, Aleksandar Sekulović, whose smooth, "Hollywood-style" photography he found inappropriate for the subject matter, much preferring the vérité-style photography by the Italian second unit cameramen.

== Reception ==
On the review aggregator website Rotten Tomatoes, 57% of 7 critics' reviews are positive, with an average rating of 5.4/10.

In their book Foreign Film Guide, authors Ronald Bergan and Robyn Karney wrote:

What does one say about this effort? Pontecorvo has jam-packed his film with every kind of tear-jerking cliché on offer and entrusted the debasement and regeneration of his heroine to a sadly inept actress. The result is an overheated melodrama which does a grave disservice to the enormity of its subject, although the horrors of the camps are realistically portrayed".

In an article for The Wall Street Journal, philosopher Bernard-Henri Lévy wrote:

Pontecorvo earned "the deepest contempt" of French director Jacques Rivette in an article in Cahiers du cinéma nearly 50 years ago for a scarcely more insistent shot in the 1959 film "Kapo." The shot was of the raised hand of actress Emmanuelle Riva, her character Terese electrocuted on the barbed wire of the concentration camp from which she was trying to escape. The criticism hung over Pontecorvo until his dying day. He was ostracized, almost cursed, for a shot, just one.

Lévy contrasted this reaction to one shot with what he asserted is the garish exploitation of Nazi history in Inglourious Basterds (2009) and Shutter Island (2010).

== See also ==
- List of Holocaust films
- List of submissions to the 33rd Academy Awards for Best Foreign Language Film
- List of Italian submissions for the Academy Award for Best Foreign Language Film
