= Mali (film) =

2018 Croatian drama film

- Film poster
- Directed by: Antonio Nuić
- Starring: Vito Dijak
- Release date: 20 July 2018 (Pula FF)
- Running time: 90 minutes
- Country: Croatia
- Language: Croatian

Mali is a 2018 Croatian drama film directed by Antonio Nuić. It was selected as the Croatian entry for the Best International Feature Film at the 92nd Academy Awards, but it was not nominated.

== Plot ==
Frenki, a drug dealer recently released from prison, battles for custody of his son.

== Cast ==
- Vito Dijak as Mali
- Franjo Dijak as Frenki
- Hrvoje Kečkeš as Keco
- Bojan Navojec as Boki
- Rakan Rushaidat as Goc
- Živko Anočić as Majić

== See also ==
- List of submissions to the 92nd Academy Awards for Best International Feature Film
- List of Croatian submissions for the Academy Award for Best International Feature Film
