= Helena Minić =

Croatian actress

- Born: Helena Minić; Pula, SR Croatia, SFR Yugoslavia
- Education: Academy of Performing Arts
- Alma mater: University of Sarajevo
- Occupation: Actress
- Years active: 2003–present
- Spouse: Dalibor Matanić (m. 2014)
- Children: 3

Helena Minić is a Croatian film, stage and television actress. Her debut role was in the 2003 multiple award-winning Bosnian film Remake.

== Biography ==
Helena Minić was born in Pula. She attended a drama school in her hometown and graduated from the Academy of Performing Arts in Sarajevo in 2002.

Her first roles were in soap operas in Zagreb. She has worked in the Istrian National Theatre, and in theatres in Virovitica and Zagreb. She received the Croatian Society of Dramatic Artists award. In 2006 she was awarded Best Young Actress for the role of Donna in Dani Satire in Zagreb.

She received the HRT Orlando Award at the Dubrovnik Summer Festival in 2025 for Best Artistic Achievement in the Drama Programme for her portrayal of Medea in the play Medeja, directed by Martin Kušej. For the same role, she was awarded the Golden Studio Award in 2026.

In 2014, she married screenwriter and film director Dalibor Matanić. They have three children together. In 2025, following allegations of sexual harassment against Matanić, Minić removed her husband’s surname from her social media profiles.

== Filmography ==
=== Television roles ===
- Stipe u gostima as Kristina (2012)
- Bibin svijet as nurse (2010)
- Zakon ljubavi as Tonka Njavro (2008)
- Mamutica as Izabela (2008)
- Zauvijek susjedi as Ana (2007)
- Naša mala klinika as guardian (2007)
- Obični ljudi as Saša Kincl (2006–2007)
- Ljubav u zaleđu as Tanja (2005–2006)

=== Film roles ===
- Lea i Darija - Dječje carstvo as mrs. in the audience (2011)
- Jenny te voli as Nataša (2010)
- Remake as Alma Dizdarević (2003)
- Egzorcizam as Vera Artuković (2017)
- U ime Jagode, Čokolade i Duha Svetoga as Magdalena (2018)

== Voice-over roles ==
Film
Year	Title	Role	Notes
2010	Marmaduke	Afghan 1	
