= Small Things (film) =

2026 Croatian drama film

Small Things Here
- Promotional poster
- Croatian: Male stvari
- Directed by: Zvonimir Jurić
- Screenplay by: Zvonimir Jurić; Jurica Pavičić
- Produced by: Ankica Jurić Tilić; Dragan Jurić
- Starring: Marija Škaričić; Izudin Bajrović; Ivana Roščić
- Cinematography: Marko Brdar
- Edited by: Ana Štulina
- Music by: Jura Ferina; Pavao Miholjević
- Production companies: Kinorama; Forum Ljubljana; A Atalanta D.O.O.
- Release dates: 11 July 2026 (Pula Film Festival); 16 August 2026 (Sarajevo)
- Running time: 80 minutes
- Countries: Croatia; Serbia; Slovenia
- Language: Croatian

Small Things (Croatian: Male stvari) is a 2026 drama film co-written, and directed by Zvonimir Jurić. A co-production between Croatia, Serbia and Slovenia, it follows two sisters Anica and Irena, who along with Irena's two children, travel to an island to visit their loner father and brother Ivan.

The film had its Croatian premiere in the main programme of the Pula Film Festival on 11 July 2026, where it competed for the Grand Golden Arena for Best Film.

It subsequently held its International premiere at the 32nd Sarajevo Film Festival on 16 August 2026, screening in the Competition Programme – Feature Film, and competed for the Heart of Sarajevo award.

== Synopsis ==
During a winter weekend, Anica and Irena travel with Irena’s two children to the island to visit their father and their brother, Ivan, who lives a withdrawn, solitary life. The visit is prompted by their father's intention to sell the family land. While staying in the dilapidated family house, the group must address long‑standing interpersonal tensions and make a series of difficult decisions, ending in one family member facing an ultimate sacrifice.

== Cast ==
- Marija Škaričić as Anica
- Izudin Bajrović as father
- Ivana Roščić as Irena
- Juraj Lerotić as Ivan
- Bepina Baričević as Kate
- Borna Mihovilović as Ivor

== Production ==
Principal photography for the film, conducted on locations in Zagreb and on the Adriatic islands of Pašman and Krk, was completed in March 2025.

== Release ==
Small Things had its Croatian premiere in the main programme of the Pula Film Festival on 11 July 2026. Subsequently it had its international premiere at the 32nd Sarajevo Film Festival, where it competed for Heart of Sarajevo award in the Competition Programme - Feature Film on 16 August 2026.

== Reception ==
Writing for Cineuropa at Pula Film Festival, Marko Stojiljković praised the screenplay by Zvonimir Jurić and Jurica Pavičić for its "excellent dramaturgy", highlighting its natural dialogue, carefully timed revelations, and moments of relief that balance the film's bleak tone. He also commended the performances of the ensemble cast, noting that the script allows the actors to deliver understated yet convincing portrayals, including Snježana Sinovčić-Šiškov in a supporting role. He further praised the film's "carefully framed static shots" by Marko Brdar; austere audiovisual style, particularly its lack of a musical score, the wind-filled sound design by Julij Zornik and Ognjen Popić, subdued lighting, and Ana Štulina's precise editing, which, in his opinion, made the film "a discreetly unpleasant, but quite necessary and highly emotional viewing experience."

== Accolades ==
Award	Date of ceremony	Category	Recipient	Result	Ref.
Pula Film Festival	16 July 2026	Grand Golden Arena for Best Film	Small Things	Nominated	
Sarajevo Film Festival	21 August 2026	Heart of Sarajevo	Small Things	Nominated	
