= Goran Trbuljak =

Croatian cinematographer (born 1948)

- Born: 21 April 1948 (age 78); Varaždin, PR Croatia, FPR Yugoslavia (modern Croatia)
- Occupation: Cinematographer
- Years active: 1980–present

Goran Trbuljak (born 21 April 1948 in Varaždin) is a Croatian cinematographer, photographer and conceptual artist.

Trbuljak had first studied at the graphic arts department of the Zagreb Academy of Fine Arts, where he graduated from in 1972. After spending two years of apprenticeship at the École Nationale Supérieure des Beaux-Arts in Paris, he returned to Croatia and enrolled at the Zagreb Academy of Drama Arts and studied cinematography until he graduated in 1980.

His filmmaking career started in 1980 with Ante Babaja's film Lost Homeland (Izgubljeni zavičaj), after which he went on to shoot some 25 feature films, as well as a number of television films and series. Trbuljak worked with many prominent Croatian directors, such as Branko Schmidt, Zvonimir Berković, Krsto Papić, Zoran Tadić, Davor Žmegač, and others. He is also a five-time winner of the Golden Arena for Best Cinematography award at the Pula Film Festival, the national film awards festival.

Trbuljak also worked as a graphic designer for a number of notable magazines, such as Film, Polet and Gordogan, and wrote articles about film, photography and arts for popular dailies and weeklies such as Globus and Slobodna Dalmacija. In addition, he has been teaching at the Zagreb Academy of Drama Arts since 1988.

Trbuljak has also made significant contribution to Croatian conceptual art since early 70s, exhibiting highly intriguing works that bend the boundaries between written word, theory, painting and photography.
