= Mother of Asphalt =

- Majka asfalta
- Directed by: Dalibor Matanić
- Production companies: Kinorama, Hrvatska Radiotelevizija (HRT)
- Release date: July 22, 2010 (Croatia)
- Running time: 107 mins
- Country: Croatia
- Language: Croatian

Mother of Asphalt (Croatian: Majka asfalta) is a 2010 Croatian film directed by Dalibor Matanić. The film is a social melodrama that highlights the materialistic aspirations of a young couple in their mid thirties and who are unable to perceive the emotional impact and the consequences thereof.

== Plot ==
Mare and Janko are a young married couple and both are working. They have a son, Bruno, who is 7 years old. With materialistic aspirations they have acquired an upscale flat in Zagreb on loan basis. Suddenly, just before Christmas, Mare loses her secretarial job. She becomes restless. As she returns home, after a dinner party her husband does not sympathize with her plight but tries to force himself on her for his carnal pleasures. When Mare resists, Janko is furious and beats her up; the scene is set in a silhouetted night sequence with Christmas lights visible at the window. Mare unable to bear the marital torture leaves her husband and goes out of the house with her son in midnight. She seeks shelter with her friend who is not very sympathetic with the step taken by her friend. But her friend's husband is not sympathetic to Mare and asks her to leave the house. She then starts living in her car. She spends the day wandering in the street of Zagreb telling her young son that they are on an "adventure". On Christmas night, Milan, a security guard at a store who is single and quite unimpressive, sees Mare and her son living a crammed space in the car. As a good samaritan, he offers them shelter in the store which he is guarding.

== Cast ==
- Marija Škaričić as Mare
- Janko Popović Volarić as Janko
- Noa Nikolić as Bruno
- Krešimir Mikić as Milan
- Ozren Grabarić as Ozren
- Judita Franković as Iva
- Lana Barić as Višnja

== Production ==
The film is produced by Ankica Juric Tilic for "Kinorama" and Hrvatska Radiotelevizija and directed by Dalibor Matanić who has also provided the screenplay with Tomislav Zajec. Tomislav Pavlic is the editor. Music score is provided by Jura Ferina and Pavao Miholjević. It has a run time of 104 minutes.

== Awards ==
The film has received the following awards:

- Golden FIPA 2011 awards
  - Fiction: Actress Marija Skaričić, Croatia
  - Fiction, Dalibor Matanić
  - Fiction: Music, Jura Ferina, Pavle Miholjević
- Pula Film Festival 2010
  - Best Actress in a Leading Role: Marija Skaričić
