= The Blacks (film) =

2009 film

- Film poster
- Croatian: Crnci
- Directed by: Goran Dević; Zvonimir Jurić
- Written by: Goran Dević; Zvonimir Jurić
- Produced by: Ankica Jurić-Tilić
- Starring: Ivo Gregurević
- Cinematography: Branko Linta
- Edited by: Vanja Sirucek
- Release dates: 20 July 2009 (Pula Film Festival); 3 February 2010 (Croatia)
- Running time: 75 minutes
- Country: Croatia
- Language: Croatian
- Budget: HRK 3.7 million

The Blacks (Croatian: Crnci) is a 2009 Croatian drama film directed by Goran Dević and Zvonimir Jurić. The film was selected as the Croatian entry for the Best Foreign Language Film at the 83rd Academy Awards, but it did not make the final shortlist.

== Plot ==
The main title of the film refers to a fictional paramilitary formation, which uses the nickname of a unit of the Croatian paramilitary known as the Croatian defence forces and by the German occupied Independent State of Croatia during World War II. The plot takes place in the post-war Osijek. The soldiers were given the task of retrieving the bodies of fallen comrades from the minefield. The plot includes real events related to the "Garage" case, a war crime in which Serb prisoners of war were tortured.

== Cast ==
- Ivo Gregurević as Ivo
- Krešimir Mikić as Barišić
- Franjo Dijak as Franjo
- Rakan Rushaidat as Darko
- Nikša Butijer as Saran
- Emir Hadžihafizbegović as Lega
- Stjepan Pete as File
- Saša Anočić as Vozač

== Awards and nominations ==
Award	Year	Category	Recipients	Result
Pula Film Festival.	2009	Best Director	Goran Dević; Zvonimir Jurić	Won
Pula Film Festival.	2009	Best Sound Editing	Dubravka Premar	Won
Pula Film Festival.	2009	Best Supporting Actor	Nikša Butijer	Won
Ljubljana International Film Festival	2009	The Kingfisher Award	Goran Dević; Zvonimir Jurić	Won

== See also ==
- List of submissions to the 83rd Academy Awards for Best Foreign Language Film
- List of Croatian submissions for the Academy Award for Best Foreign Language Film
