= Ivana Roščić =

Croatian actress

- Born: 27 September 1978 (age 47); Split, SR Croatia, SFR Yugoslavia
- Occupation: Actress
- Years active: 2004–present

Ivana Roščić (born 27 September 1978) is a Croatian actress. She appeared in more than twenty films since 2004.

== Selected filmography ==
Year	Title	Role	Notes
2004	A Wonderful Night in Split	Anđela	
2005	I Love You	Waitress	
2013	A Stranger	Zehra	
2020	Stories from the Chestnut Woods	Marta	
2020	Tereza37	Renata	
2024	My Late Summer	Katarina	
2026	Small Things		
