= Siberian Lady Macbeth =

1962 film

- DVD cover
- Directed by: Andrzej Wajda
- Written by: Nikolai Leskov
- Starring: Ljuba Tadić; Olivera Markovic
- Cinematography: Aleksandar Sekulović
- Music by: Dušan Radić
- Release date: 1962
- Running time: 93 minutes
- Countries: Poland; Yugoslavia
- Languages: Polish; Serbian

Siberian Lady Macbeth (Orig. Sibirska Ledi Magbet), also translated as Fury Is a Woman, is a 1962 film directed by Andrzej Wajda, based on the novella Lady Macbeth of the Mtsensk District by Nikolai Leskov.

== Cast ==
- Olivera Marković - Katerina Izmajlowa / Lady Macbeth
- Ljuba Tadić - Sergei
- Kapitalina Erić - cook
- Bojan Stupica - Izmajlow
- Miodrag Lazarević - Zinovij Izmailow
- Branka Petrić - aunt
