= Dušan Radić =

Serbian composer (1929–2010)

Dušan Radić (Serbian Cyrillic: Душан Радић; 10 April 1929 – 3 April 2010) was a Serbian composer, university professor, and a full member of the Serbian Academy of Sciences and Arts (SASA, SANU in Serbian).

== Biography ==
Radić was born in Sombor. He completed elementary and high school sophomore year in his birthplace Sombor. He concurrently attended the music school of the Serbian Church Singing Society. He relocated to Belgrade in 1941 where he continued education at the Second men's gymnasium and the “Stanković” music school. He matriculated at the Belgrade Academy of music (now Faculty of music, University of Arts in Belgrade) in 1946 in the composition class of Milenko Živković, who acted as his mentor until 1954. Since 1957 Radić studied in Paris with Darius Milhaud and Olivier Messiaen, completing, upon return, a master's degree in 1962 with Živković as his adviser.

In early student works Radić demonstrated his innovative tendencies in the quest for expressive means different than those exhibited in the late Romanticism and soc-realism. While his melodies reveal their “origins in our lands,” Radić rarely resorts to direct quotations of folk tunes, and by frequently treating vocal parts in an instrumental fashion, he emphasizes a rhythmic component. Radić attracted public attention with his Sonata Lesta, composed during his studies and premiered by pianist Mirjana Šuica in 1952. His diploma work, Sinfonietta in three movements, was performed on 8 June 1954 by the Belgrade Philharmonic with conductor Živojin Zdravković. His work The Name list—thirteen sketches, was performed on 17 March 1954 in a version for soprano and piano at the concert of compositions by Dušan Radić and Enriko Josif, by performers Ljubica Vrsjakov and Ružica Mijatović. This concert entailed a debate among critics centered on the questions of modernism and realism, directing, each from their own perspective, the path Serbian music should follow in the future. Radić's cantata Awaiting Maria was premiered on 27 March 1957 by the Belgrade Philharmonic and Radio Belgrade Choir with conductor Oskar Danon, vocal soloist Biserka Cvejić, and narrator Ljuba Tadić. His Divertimento for string orchestra, vibraphone and percussion was performed on 29 November the same year, by the same orchestra and conductor Dragoljub Erić.

Radić was active as a freelance composer for 25 years, from 1954 to 1979 when he received a professorial composition position at the Academy of Arts in Novi Sad (University of Novi Sad) where he remained until retirement. He pursued various specialized courses in Kyiv, London, Moscow, Paris, Prague, Riga, Rome, and St. Petersburg. He was an active contributor to Yugoslav and Serbian music life for forty five years, among other endeavors, as a member of the Composers' Association of Serbia (CAS) since 1949, and also occasionally included film scores among his repertoire, notably Siberian Lady Macbeth (1962), directed by Andrzej Wajda, and the epic films The Long Ships (1964) and Genghis Khan (1965). Radić is a recipient of the Composers' Association of Yugoslavia Award (SOKOJ in Serbian) in 1954, the Belgrade October Award in 1959, and Petar Konjović Award in 1972, among others. He was elected a corresponding member of the Serbian Academy of Sciences and Arts in 1972 and a full member in 1983.

Dušan Radić died on 3 April 2010 in Belgrade.

== Works ==
Radić's oeuvre consists of stage works—opera Love, that's the main thing and ballet The Ballad of the vagabond moon; vocal-instrumental compositions The Scull-Tower, The Standup country, Awaiting Maria, Scenes from the countryside, The Name list, Landscapes, and The Besieged gaiety; orchestral pieces a Symphony, Sinfonietta, Two Symphonic images, Divertimento, Concertino, and Variations on a folk theme; as well as chamber and solo pieces.

=== Musical Language ===
While lyrical segments and leisurely gaiety can be commonly found in Radić's compositions, other works, as early as his diploma work feature pungent harmonies and polytonality. His remarkable themes are generally shaped by scherzo-like and burlesque rhythms, as his works often communicate grotesque and parody. Despite the fact that he challenged tonal clichés by unusual treatment of parallel chords and obstinate figures, Radić did not abandon the tonal line of thought.

=== The Ballad of the vagabond moon ===
The Ballad of the vagabond moon, a ballet in three scenes, Radić composed in 1957 after the libretto by Bora Ćosić. The ballet's socio-psychological plot tinted by fantasy, Radić set to music by prevalently neoclassic expression, with particular attention devoted to rhythm which frequently implies jazz. He also reworked the music from this ballet into a concert suite.

Prologue and Scene One: The Poet, otherwise a clerk in a science institute, consistently feels that he does not belong to the world surrounding him – at the soccer game, at the beach, and through the failure with his secretary. Persuaded by his counterpart, by his ironical-rational alter ego, he ventures into search for his love ideal among the stars, exchanging roles with the Moon.

Scene Two: The Poet's quest is futile–he does not find the one he is looking for. The green comet is unsuccessfully luring him; the public opinion of the Universe is offended by his indifference, and the Poet is finally forced to escape by jumping back to Earth.

Scene Three: On Earth, the Poet is still searching for the woman of his dreams; momentarily it seems as he had found her in a pub, but what follows is yet another disappointment and he continues his vagabond pursuit (Peričić 1969: 409).

The actual content of the ballet, although unusual, somewhat reflects everyday life (including particular local Belgrade neighborhoods and spots like Dorćol and Mažestik) and certain composer's formal interventions created a hybrid form—e.g., the narrator who intervenes in the plot and among the ballet dancers, as well as jazz elements and a jazz band on the stage. The event when the Poet declares “Alone on the stage,” potentially leads toward the voidance of distinction between performers and audience as an exit from the work itself, its self-relativization, and as an anticipation of a significant element of contemporary theatre in general. A remarkable ballet scene takes place at the very end, when during a true ironic shift the Poet kills the Felo-de-se in a tavern (kafana), over glum sonorities of the authentic kafana music, lacking tragedy, in other words routinely, but also lacking the gravity that could possibly hinder the work's imposed vaudeville character. Radić explained the background of his ballet as follows:

“As a young composer, the beginner, I was alarmed by the new revelations, new information, and still vivid memories of the war (WW II) horrors. After the adolescent fervor dwindled and staring eyes took another, more realistic look at life, the world became a burlesque, and I obscured over-serious issues by imagination. Experience taught me to play the game much cooler and to take incidents light-heartedly. I then turned to the theatre and started writing ballet and opera, with an idea to offer the audience encouragement in solving their life issues. The Vagabond plot is conceived as a romantic love ‘above all,’ as a light and humble tale about a poetic soul and his ever-present illusions. My intention was to subtly guide the audience to thinking about mechanical machinery of the present time through sometimes upbeat and sometimes somber music and picturesque verses, to shake up their spirit and their, as Charlie Chaplin would frame it, ‘modern time’ idle spiritual activities. The more variety in the play, thus there is more pep in music and more picturesque scenes with a subtle message ‘all’s well that ends well.’ I believe that the animating libretto and dance-like music open ample possibilities for a rich, contemporary idiom-bound theatre event … To mention another peculiarity, I interspersed stylized rhythmic and melodic jazz elements throughout the work in a non-obstructive manner. The third scene even features an authentic jazz quintet in a bar setting. I would think that the incorporation of pantomime and contained acrobatics would enhance customary expression of classical ballet.”

=== Two Symphonic images ===
The Two Symphonic images (1953) comprise a diptych, featuring in the final movement a female choir and solo mezzo-soprano conjoint with orchestra. As a motto for this work, Radić in the score inscribed a quotation from Oscar Wilde’s De Profundis: “...and I know that for me, to whom flowers are part of desire, there are tears waiting in the petals of some rose.” The first image based upon a freely treated sonata form yields the thematic material in the brass and a scherzo-like line of complex meter. The ternary form of the second image is executed by symmetric location of two segments of a rondo, around an intermezzo entitled An Elegy that serves as an axis of the form. In the first part, a fervent theme characterized by leaps of the seventh interval in violin solo alternates with vivacious mezzo-soprano turns, while in the second part, the orchestra counters the choir.

=== The Name list ===
The Name list, thirteen sketches for thirteen performers, conceived during his college years, Radić finalized in 1955, arranging it for soprano, mezzo-soprano, oboe, cor Anglais, saxophone, bass clarinet, harp, double bass, and percussions. For this work in its initial version Radić received a Composers' Association of Yugoslavia Award. The piece was written after succinct lyrics by Vasko Popa, which according to Radić “paint the inner nature of things and their living, humanized representation.” The lapidary lyrics resulted in a “balkanized” structure of musical flow, apparent not only by the number of sketches, but also by their mutual relationships. In the Name list, Radić in fact operates with a large pool of means of expressions and treats each of the thirteen parts freely by shifting each of their typical predispositions. Particularly dynamic seems the vocal part that brings intensity and quality of expression by chant-scan, ostinato motives, Sprechstimme, melisma, and instrumental treatment of vocals.

=== Gungulice ===
Gungulice for mixed choir was inspired by folk tunes and works of Stevan Mokranjac, while the actual material for this composition originated in the collection of Vladimir Đorđević entitled From the prewar Serbia. In his selections, Radić was not guided by authenticity or regional coherency of sound material, but rather by the sound of each song. Thus, Gungulice consists of the ritual, love, and humorous tunes, not ordered by logical development known from Mokranjac's Song-wreaths (Rukoveti in Serbian). Radić follows the folk practice of setting different lyrics to the same tune and vice versa. The narrow melodic spans that facilitate formation of obstinate aggregations do not serve as tools in search for authentic folk expression, but rather for building a modernist construction of reduced expression whose brisk sounds of fifth and second intervals relate to folk vocal tradition primarily in the context of the composer's neoclassicist tendencies.

=== Oratorio profano ===
Oratorio profano (1974) for three narrators, three instrumental chamber groups, four orchestras, four timpani, organ, and tape was premiered in 1979. Radić here used his usual models of simulation of folk and popular music, as well as those known from the history of avant-gardes such as Aleatory, performance, sound poetry, and electronic media. In this work, the composer reached for citations in piano pieces by Alexander Scriabin and Igor Stravinsky. Radić commented on this work:

“Oratorio was not a turning-point in my work as it may have seemed to some....I did not intend to invent anything new. I don't have innovative ambitions and do not appreciate experiments with no results. I do not engraft theory onto music fabric. Simply said, as an artist, I tried to use nowadays' 'music fluids' to come up with my representation of our time.”

== Significant works ==
Stage works:

- Ballet The Ballad of the vagabond moon (Balada o mesecu lutalici in Serbian) (1957)
- Opera Love, that’s the main thing (Ljubav, to je glavna stvar in Serbian) (1962)

Vocal-instrumental compositions:

- The Name list (Spisak in Serbian)(1954)
- The Standup country (Uspravna zemlja) (1964)
- Awaiting Maria (U očekivanju Marije) (1955)
- The Besieged gaiety (Opsednuta vedrina) (1952-54)
- The Scull-Tower (Ćele kula) (1957)
- Oratorio profano (1974)

Orchestral pieces:

- Two Symphonic images (Dve simfonijske slike) (1953-77)
- Sinfonietta (1954)
- Divertimento (1956)
- Concertino (1956)

Choral pieces:

- Gungulice (1953)

Solo works:

- Sonata Lesta, for piano (1950)

=== Selected Sheet Music ===
- Sonata Lesta (Composers’ Association of Serbia, CAS (UKS in Serbian), 1985)
- Three preludes (CAS, 1985)
- Four sonatinas (CAS, 1986)
- Piano suite (self-published)
- Prelude, Arietta, and Toccatina, for harp (self-published)
- Sonatina op. 1, no. 2, for oboe and piano (Belgrade, 1984), score and solo part
- Novella (Pripovetka), for trumpet and piano (Belgrade, 1970)
- An Autumn song (Jesenja pesma), a poem for mixed choir, op. 2, no. 3 (CAS, 1983)
- Merry sailing (Vesela plovidba), and other songs for children choir, voice, and piano (Knjaževac: Nota, 1981)
- Three songs, for soprano, harp, and string orchestra, op. 2, no. 2 (CAS, 1981)
- Song and dance (Pesma i igra), for violin and string orchestra (Belgrade, 1983)
- Transfigurations (Transfiguracije), for wind quintet and string orchestra, op. 22, no. 1 (Belgrade, 1987)
- Concertino, for clarinet and string orchestra, op. 2, no. 4 (CAS, 1982)
- Bagatelles, for wind quintet, op. 13, no. 4 (Belgrade, 1984)
- Variations on a folk theme, op. 4, no. 1 (CAS, 1981)
- Sinfonietta (Yugoslav Composers Editions, 1965)
- Symphony no. 1 (CAS, 1969)
- The Standup country, chamber cantata op. 15 (SASA (SANU in Serbian), 1976)
- Awaiting Maria, cantata op. 9 (SASA, 1980)
- The Teachers (Učitelji), op. 12 (SASA, 1988)
- Voices from Šumarice (Glasovi sa Šumarica), cantata in commemoration of the 1941 Kragujevac massacre victims, op. 16 (SASA, 2007)
- The Scull-Tower, cantata (Belgrade: Prosveta, 1963)
- Scenes from the countryside (Prizori sa sela), op. 3, no. 3 (Belgrade, 1986)
- Vuk’s Serbia (Vukova Srbija), festive song for the annual celebration of Vuk Karadžić (Vukov sabor), for soloists, choir, and orchestra (CAS, 1979)
- Sterija’s no thing from nothing (Sterijino ništa iz ništa), epitaph for mixed choir (self-published)
- Gungulice, choral patterns for a group of twenty-four singers (self-published)
- A Suite in old style (Svita u starom stilu), dance number from opera Love, that’s the main thing (Belgrade, 1989)
- Suite from ballet The Ballad of the vagabond moon (Yugoslav Composers Editions, 1962)

=== Selected Recordings ===
- Vuk’s Serbia, PGP RTB, LP 2505, 1977.
- Little Tumults, The New sound, CD 11.
- The Tower of Skulls (The Skull-Tower), III and IV, The New sound, CD 11.
- The Long Ships (soundtrack), Colpix Records, CP 517, 1964.
- Genghis Khan (soundtrack), KR 20017-7, Kritzerland, 0026296CD, 2011.

== Literature ==
- Mikić, Vesna. 2007. „The Neoclassical tendencies” (Neoklasične tendencije). In A History of Serbian music. Belgrade: Zavod za udžbenike.
- Mikić, Vesna. 2009. The Faces of Serbian music – Neoclassicism (Lica srpske muzike – neoklasicizam). Belgrade: FMU.
- Milin, Melita. 1998. The Traditional and the novel in post World War II Serbian music (1945-1965) (Tradicionalno i novo u srpskoj muzici posle Drugog svetskog rata (1945-1965)). Belgrade: Institute of Musicology, SASA.
- Peričić, Vlastimir. 1969. Composers in Serbia (Muzički stvaraoci u Srbiji). Belgrade: Prosveta.
- Stojanović-Novičić, Dragana and Marija Masnikosa.2007. “Orchestral music,” in A History of Serbian music, Belgrade: Zavod za udžbenike.
