= Antonio Nuić =

Croatian film director (born 1977)

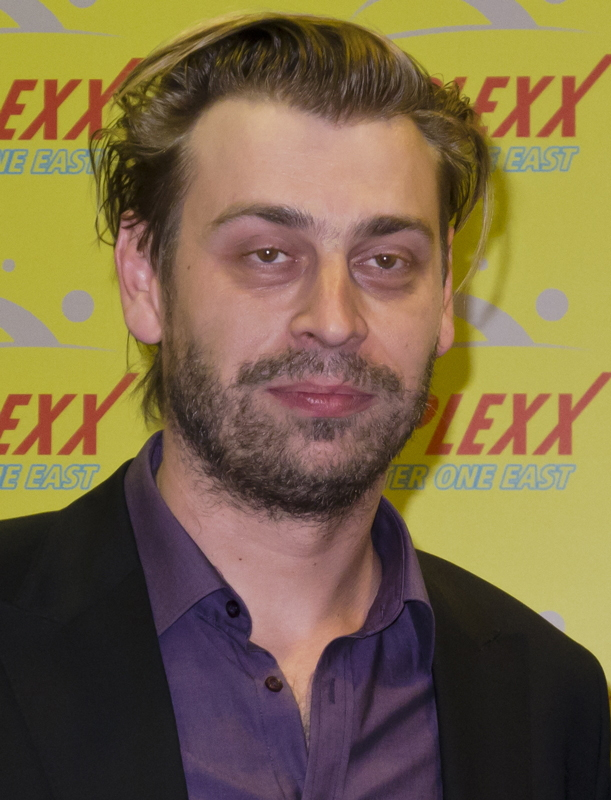
- Nuić in 2012
- Born: 26 March 1977 (age 48); Sarajevo, SR Bosnia and Herzegovina, Yugoslavia (now Bosnia and Herzegovina)
- Occupation(s): Film director, screenwriter
- Years active: 2006–present

Antonio Nuić (born 26 March 1977 in Sarajevo) is a Bosnian Croatian film director and screenwriter.

== Biography ==
Nuić had graduated from the Zagreb Academy of Drama Art before beginning his career directing music videos and short films. His first short film Na mjestu događaja (1998) and Vratite im Dinamo (1999) won awards at student film festivals. His next project was Sex, drink and bloodshed (Seks, piće i krvoproliće, 2004), a film in three segments, for which he directed the 23 minutes long Bloodshed segment.

His first feature film was All for Free (Sve džaba, 2006), which won him the Best Director and Best Screenplay awards at the 2006 Pula Film Festival. This was followed by Donkey (Kenjac, 2009) which was Croatia's submission for the Academy Award for Best Foreign Language Film at the 82nd Academy Awards, without receiving a nomination. He also directed the Croatian-language versions of the Teenage Mutant Ninja Turtles film and the Academy Award-winning animated feature Ratatouille (both 2007).

In 2010 Nuić was elected president of the Croatian Film Directors Guild.

== Filmography ==
- All for Free (Sve džaba, 2006)
- Donkey (Kenjac, 2009)
- Life Is a Trumpet (Život je truba, 2015)
- Mali (2018)
