= Goran Dević =

Croatian film director and screenwriter

- Born: 1971 (age 54–55); Sisak, SFR Yugoslavia
- Occupations: Film director, screenwriter
- Years active: 2001–present

Goran Dević (born 1971) is a Croatian film director, screenwriter and university professor.

== Biography ==
Born in Sisak Dević was formally educated at the University of Zagreb's Faculty of Law, the Faculty of Humanities and Social Sciences (archaeology department) and the Academy of Dramatic Art (film directing department), where he graduated in 2008, and is teaching since 20122 at the Department of Film and TV Directing.

Since the early 2000s Dević directed a number of short subjects and short documentaries, including award-winning: On the Water (2018), The Steel Mill Café (2017), 65+ (2016), Two Furnaces for Udarnik Josip Trojko (2012), Don Juan: Excuse Me, Miss (2010), The Flood (2010), Happy Land (2009), Three (2008), I Have Nothing Nice to Say to You (2005), Imported Crows (2004) and others. Imported Crows was awarded at Motovun Film Festival, Sarajevo Film Festival and Croatian Film Days, shown at 10 international festivals.

His feature film directorial debut (which he co-directed and co-written with Zvonimir Jurić) was a critically acclaimed 2009 psychological war drama titled The Blacks. The film deals with a fictional Croatian Army unit who refuse to lay down their arms following the end of the Croatian War of Independence.

The film won Jurić and Dević 4 national awards including: the Golden Arena for Best Director at the 2009 Pula Film Festival, the Croatian national film awards, City of Zagreb Award, as well as 8 international awards including: Grand prix on Ljubljana International Film Festival 2009, Grand Prix at Auteur Film Festival Serbia 2009, FIPRESCI Award and Special Award for Directing at FilmFestival Cottbus 2009, Crossing Europe Filmfestival Linz and others. It went on to be selected as Croatia's submission to the 83rd Academy Awards for the Academy Award for Best Foreign Language Film, but it failed to make the final shortlist.

Retrospectives of his documentaries were screened at ARSENAL CINEMA, Institute for Film (Berlin) and Crossing Europe Filmfestival (Linz), BELDOX (Belgrade), ZAGREBDOX (Croatia) i MAXII, the National Museum of 21st Century Art (Rome).

In 2017, Dević has signed the Declaration on the Common Language of the Croats, Serbs, Bosniaks and Montenegrins.

== Filmography ==
Feature film: The Blacks (Crnci, 2009; co-director)

Documentaries:

- Self-pleasure among Croatians (Samozadovoljavanje u Hrvata, 2003)
- Weekend in Sisak (Vikend u Sisku, 2001),
- Imported Crows (Uvozne vrane, 2004),
- I Have Nothing Nice to Say to You (Nemam ti šta reć' lijepo, 2006),
- Three (Tri, 2008),
- All will be alright (Ma sve ce biti u redu, 2008),
- Happy Land (Sretna zemlja, 2009),
- The Flood (Poplava, 2010)
- Two Furnaces for Udarnik Josip Trojko (Dvije peći za udarnika Josipa Trojka, 2012)
- Don Juan: Excuse me, Miss! (2011),
- 65+ (2016),
- The Steel Mill Café (Buffet Željezara, 2017),
- In the name of Croatia (U ime Republike Hrvatske, 2018),
- On the Water (Na vodi, 2018),
- The Building (Hrvatskog narodnog preporoda, 2022)
