= 100 Minutes of Glory =

- Croatian DVD Cover
- Original title: 100 minuta Slave
- Directed by: Dalibor Matanić
- Written by: Robert Perišić
- Produced by: Goran Mećava; Sanja Vejnović
- Starring: Sanja Vejnović
- Cinematography: Branko Linta
- Edited by: Tomislav Pavlic
- Music by: Jura Ferina; Pavle Miholjević
- Release date: July 16, 2004 (Croatia)
- Running time: 100 minutes
- Country: Croatia
- Language: Croatian

100 Minutes of Glory (Croatian: Sto minuta Slave) is a 2004 Croatian biographical drama film directed by Dalibor Matanić.

The film tells the story of Slava Raškaj, a turn-of-the-century artist, often described as Croatian Frida Kahlo.

== Title ==
The title of the movie is a pun. Slava Raškaj's given name translates to “glory”.

== Cast ==
- Sanja Vejnović as Slava Raškaj
- Miki Manojlović as Bela Čikoš Sesija
- Vili Matula as Rapacki
- Nataša Lušetić as Justina
- Krunoslav Šarić as Slava's Father
- Nada Gačešić as Slava's Mother
- Luka Petrušić as Slava's Brother
- Darko Rundek as Charles Dubayer
- Maja Anušić as Young Slava
- Ivana Bolanča as Klara
- Jasna Beri as Marica
- Krešimir Mikić as Imri the Fiancé
- Bojan Navojec as Marko from the Salon
- Milan Živković as Lion from the Salon
