= Aleksandar Sekulović =

Yugoslav cinematographer (1918–1974)

- Born: 25 September 1918; Herceg Novi, Austria-Hungary (present-day Montenegro)
- Died: 28 August 1974 (aged 55); Belgrade, Yugoslavia (present-day Serbia)
- Occupation: Cinematographer
- Years active: 1947–1974

Aleksandar Sekulović (25 September 1918 – 28 August 1974) was a Yugoslavian cinematographer.

== Biogrpahy ==
Sekulović started his career in the late 1940s, shooting newsreels commissioned by the Yugoslav People's Army. His first experience with filmmaking came in 1947, when he was assistant to cinematographer Žorž Skrigin during the making of the war drama Slavica (directed by Vjekoslav Afrić). The following year Sekulović shot his first feature film, Immortal Youth (Besmrtna mladost).

He went on to shoot some 20 feature films in a career which spanned almost three decades and which earned him four Golden Arena for Best Cinematography awards at the Pula Film Festival, the Yugoslav national film awards festival.

Sekulović also worked on several international productions with renowned directors such as Gillo Pontecorvo, Andrzej Wajda and Robert Siodmak. Most notable of these is Pontecorvo's 1959 film Kapò which was nominated for the Academy Award for Best Foreign Language Film at the 33rd Academy Awards.

== Selected filmography ==
- Legends of Anika (Anikina vremena, 1954; directed by Vladimir Pogačić)
- Big and Small (Veliki i mali, 1956; directed by Vladimir Pogačić)
- Saturday Night (Subotom uveče, 1957; directed by Vladimir Pogačić)
- Sam (Alone, 1959; directed by Vladimir Pogačić)
- Kapò (1959; directed by Gillo Pontecorvo)
- Siberian Lady Macbeth (Sibirska Ledi Magbet, 1961; directed by Andrzej Wajda)
- Kozara (1962; directed by Veljko Bulajić)
- The Shoot (1964; directed by Robert Siodmak)
- Downstream from the Sun (Nizvodno od sunca, 1969; directed by Fedor Škubonja)
