= Nausikaya =

- Serbo-Croatian: Nausikaja
- Directed by: Vicko Ruić
- Written by: Vicko Ruić
- Based on: "The Spider" by Hanns Heinz Ewers
- Produced by: Vicko Ruić
- Starring: Nada Gačešić-Livaković
- Release date: 1995
- Running time: 111 minutes
- Country: Croatia
- Language: Serbo-Croatian

Nausikaya (Serbo-Croatian: Nausikaja) is a 1995 Croatian film directed, written and produced by Vicko Ruić. It is based on "The Spider", a horror short story by Hanns Heinz Ewers. The film was selected as the Croatian entry for the Best Foreign Language Film at the 69th Academy Awards, but was not accepted as a nominee.

== Cast ==
- Nada Gačešić-Livaković as Marija Slajner
- Igor Serdar as Matija Remetin
- Maja Nekić as Nausikaja
- Mustafa Nadarević as Inspector Stevović

== See also ==
- List of submissions to the 69th Academy Awards for Best Foreign Language Film
- List of Croatian submissions for the Academy Award for Best Foreign Language Film
