= Zvonimir Jurić =

Croatian film director and screenwriter

- Born: 4 June 1971 (age 55); Osijek, SFR Yugoslavia
- Occupations: Film director, screenwriter
- Years active: 1996–present

Zvonimir Jurić (born 4 June 1971) is a Croatian film director and screenwriter. In 2009, he co-directed and co-wrote the 2009 psychological war drama titled The Blacks.

== Early life ==
Born in Osijek, SFR Yugoslavia, on 4 June 1971, Jurić finished his primary and secondary education in his hometown. As a teenager the 1980s he appeared in minor roles in a number of TV series produced by TV Zagreb such as the 10-part biographical series Nikola Tesla (1977), the Partisan series Nepokoreni grad (1982) and the popular children's series Smogovci (1982).

== Career ==
After graduating from high school, Jurić spent the 1991–92 semester studying film directing at the Loyola Marymount University in Los Angeles. In 1992, he returned to Croatia and enrolled at the film directing department of the Academy of Dramatic Art in Zagreb. While a student at the academy, Jurić directed several short films and documentaries. In 2017, he has signed the Declaration on the Common Language of the Croats, Serbs, Bosniaks and Montenegrins.

=== Feature film directorial debut ===
His feature film directorial debut (which he co-directed and co-written with Goran Dević) was a critically acclaimed 2009 psychological war drama titled The Blacks. The film deals with a fictional Croatian Army unit who refuse to lay down their arms during a cease-fire in the Croatian War of Independence. The film won Jurić and Dević the Golden Arena for Best Director at the 2009 Pula Film Festival, the Croatian national film awards. It went on to be selected as Croatia's submission to the 83rd Academy Awards for the Academy Award for Best Foreign Language Film, but it failed to make the final shortlist.

== Filmography ==
- Zagreb Stories (Zagrebačke priče; 2002; segment)
- Sex, Drink and Bloodshed (Seks, piće i krvoproliće; 2004; segment)
- The Blacks (Crnci, 2009; co-director)
- The Reaper (Kosac, 2014)
- Small Things (Male stvari, 2026)
