= Dalibor Matanić =

Croatian screenwriter and director

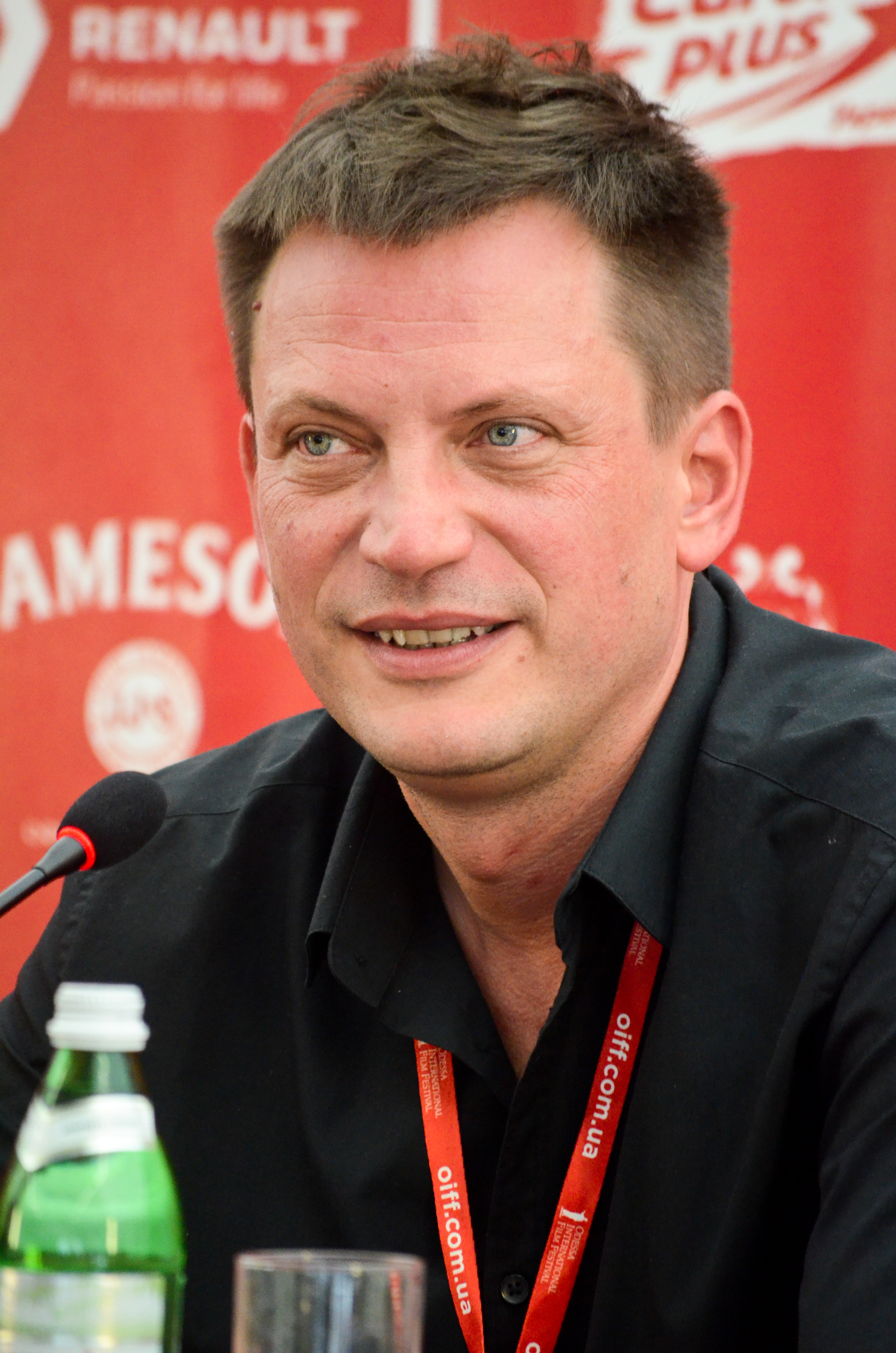
- Matanić at the Odesa International Film Festival in 2015
- Born: 21 January 1975 (age 51); Zagreb, SR Croatia, Yugoslavia
- Education: Academy of Dramatic Art
- Alma mater: University of Zagreb
- Occupations: Screenwriter; film director
- Years active: 2000–present
- Spouse: Helena Minić (m. 2014)
- Children: 2
- Awards: Golden Arena for Best Director; 2002 Fine Dead Girls

Dalibor Matanić (Croatian pronunciation: [dǎliboːr mǎtanit͡ɕ], born 21 January 1975) is a Croatian filmmaker and screenwriter, known for raising pressing social issues in his films.

== Career ==
Dalibor Matanić was born in Zagreb in 1975 to Tomo, a building engineer, and Anka, who worked as a cashier. Matanić graduated from the Academy of Dramatic Art with a degree in Film and Television Directing. In 2000, he wrote and directed his feature debut The Cashier Wants to go to the Seaside. The main theme discussed in the film is the exploitation of workers.

In 2002, he released the feature Fine Dead Girls, a drama about a lesbian couple that suffers from the hands of their landlords and family members. It received wide acclaim and won the Grand Prix, Audience Award and Critics' Award at the national film festival. The movie also won the Special Jury Prize at the 2003 Sochi film festival.

In 2004, he released 100 Minutes of Glory, a biographical drama about Slava Raškaj, a turn-of-the-century artist, often described as Croatian Frida Kahlo. His next film, 2005 I Love You received moderate critical acclaim. Though praised for effective ambience and visuals, its screenplay was described as awkward and generally unconvincing.

In 2010 Mother of Asphalt was released. By some critics it was called the most satisfying and subtle Matanić's feature.

His 2015 film The High Sun became a great success, it got rave reviews in the international media. Some critics called it 'the biggest success of Croatian independent cinema'. The High Sun was screened in the Un Certain Regard section at the 2015 Cannes Film Festival where it won the Jury Prize. At the 62nd Pula Film Festival it won Best Croatian Film of the year award, as well as more than 20 prizes at various world film festivals.

In 2020, Matanić released The Dawn, the second film of the trilogy started with The High Sun. It was made in co-production with Italian RAI. The film was premiered at Tallinn Black Nights and then screened at several other festivals. At the Pula Film Festival the film won four Golden Arenas. The Dawn premiered on HBO in 2021.

Also in 2020, Matanić directed the main opening program "Opera Industrial" for Rijeka 2020 and staged for the Croatian National Theater a play "Berlin" written by Ivor Martinić.

In 2016, Novine TV series was launched. The nordic noir-inspired series also was greatly influenced by The Wire.

In 2022, Matanić directed The Silence (2022) series. Co-produced for HBO by Croatia, Ukraine and Russia, the story is based on a real case of sex trafficking chain that extends from Ukraine to Croatia described in a trilogy of novels by investigative journalist Drago Hedl. The noir series has been selected for the Berlinale Series Market.

=== Controversies ===
In April 2024 Matanić confessed that he deeply regrets ('kajem se') actions that he had committed, namely sexual harassment of his female colleagues. He announced this confession on his personal Facebook profile. Many of his business contracts were ended after it became public that he has for years been harassing female colleagues. In his official public announcement in April 2024 he explained how he believes that his actions were a direct result of a drug and alcohol abuse and he announced how he would take some time off from the public life in order to seek help and rehab.

== Personal life ==
Dalibor Matanić is married to actress Helena Minić. The couple has three children. As Matanić confessed in interviews, he named his children after the heroes of the movies which changed his life and influenced him deeply. His eldest daughter is Lola after Run, Lola, Run, and his second son's name is Max (after Mad Max). The couple welcomed the third son, Neo, in 2020.

== Selected filmography ==
Matanić directed more than 20 short and feature films, his works include:

- 2000: Cashier Wants to Go to the Seaside (Blagajnica hoće ići na more) – writer and director
- 2002: Fine Dead Girls (Fine mrtve djevojke) – co-writer and director
- 2004: 100 Minutes of Glory (100 minuta slave) – director
- 2005: I Love You (Volim te) – writer and director
- 2008: The Lika Cinema (Kino Lika) – co-writer and director
- 2010: Mother of Asphalt (Majka asfalta) – writer and director
- 2011: Daddy (Ćaća) – writer and director
- 2013: Handymen (Majstori) – writer and director
- 2015: The High Sun (Zvizdan) – writer and director
- 2016–20: The Paper (Novine) – director
- 2017: Exorcism (Egzorcizam) – writer and director
- 2021: Silence – director
- 2021–22: The Last Socialist Artefact (Područje bez signala) – director
