= Arsen Anton Ostojić =

Croatian film director and screenwriter

- Born: 29 July 1965 (age 61); Split, SR Croatia, Yugoslavia
- Occupations: Film director, screenwriter
- Years active: 1991–present
- Awards: Big Golden Arena for Best Film

Arsen Anton Ostojić (born 29 July 1965) is a Croatian film director and screenwriter. He is a member of the European Film Academy since 2005 and currently serves as a tenured professor at the Academy of Dramatic Art in Zagreb.

== Film Career ==
Before his directorial debut, Ostojić gained extensive experience as an assistant director and production manager on 20 feature films across Europe and the United States. He first gained critical attention with his award-winning short film The Decoration (Orden, 1989).

He made his feature film debut in 2004 with A Wonderful Night in Split (Ta divna splitska noć), which he also wrote. The film, noted for its contemporary narrative and black-and-white cinematography, earned him a nomination for the European Discovery of the Year at the 2004 European Film Awards.

Ostojić achieved further acclaim with:

- No One's Son (Ničiji sin, 2008): A drama exploring the emotional aftermath of the 1990s war. The film won the Big Golden Arena for Best Film and Ostojić received the Golden Arena for Best Director at the Pula Film Festival.
- Halima's Path (Halimin put, 2012): A highly successful film dealing with social and national divisions following the war.
- F20 (2018): His most recent feature-length thriller.

In addition to directing, he is an active film producer and has contributed to the industry as a member of various international film organizations.

== Filmography ==
- A Wonderful Night in Split (Ta divna splitska noć, 2004)
- No One's Son (Ničiji sin, 2008)
- Halima's Path (Halimin put, 2012)
- Man in the Box (2015), production stage
- F20 (2018)
- The Crystal Planet (2026)
