= Donkey (film) =

Kenjac
- Directed by: Antonio Nuić
- Produced by: Boris T. Matić
- Release date: 23 July 2009 (Pula)
- Running time: 90 minutes
- Country: Croatia
- Language: Croatian

Donkey (Croatian: Kenjac) is a Croatian drama film directed by Antonio Nuić. It was released in 2009. It was successful at the Pula Film Festival.

== Cast ==
- Nebojša Glogovac as Boro
- Nataša Janjić as Jasna
- Ljubo Kapor as Ante (as Ljubomir Kiki Kapor)
- Asja Jovanović as Tetka
- Tonko Lonza as Pasko
- Emir Hadžihafizbegović as Petar
- Roko Roglić as Luka
- Trpimir Jurkić as Iko
- Gordana Boban as Danica

== Reception ==
The film won three Golden Arena awards at the 2009 Pula Film Festival, as well as the Oktavijan Award of the Croatian Society of Film Critics for the best film of the year.
