= Nada Gačešić-Livaković =

Croatian actress

- Born: 8 October 1951 (age 74); Požega, Yugoslavia
- Occupation: Actor
- Years active: 1974–present

Nada Gačešić-Livaković (born 8 October 1951) is a Croatian actress. She appeared in more than fifty films since 1974.

== Selected filmography ==
Year	Title	Role	Notes
2009	The Lika Cinema		
2004	100 Minutes of Glory		
2003	Infection		
