= Vicko Ruić =

Croatian filmmaker and actor

Vicko Ruić (born 1959) is a Croatian film director, screenwriter, producer and actor.

Ruić graduated from the Acting Department of the Academy of Dramatic Art in Zagreb. His directorial debut, Nausikaya (1996), which Ruić also wrote and produced, was the first Croatian independent film, and was Croatia's submission to the 69th Academy Awards for the Academy Award for Best Foreign Language Film.

== Filmography ==
=== Director ===
- Nausikaya (Nausikaja, 1996)
- Serafim, the Lighthouse Keeper's Son (Serafin, svjetioničarev sin, 2002)
- The Recollection Thief (Kradljivac uspomena, 2007)
