= List of Yugoslav Wars films =

Below is an incomplete list of feature films, television films or television series which include events of the Yugoslav Wars. This list does not include documentaries, short films.

== Croatian War of Independence in film ==
Year	Country	Main title (Alternative titles)	Original title (Original script)	Director	Battles, campaigns, events depicted
1991	Croatia	Story from Croatia	Priča iz Hrvatske	Krsto Papić	Drama.
1992	FR Yugoslavia	Deserter	Дезертер; Dezerter	Živojin Pavlović	Drama, Romance. Battle of Vukovar
1993	Croatia; Italy	A Time for...	Vrijeme za …	Oja Kodar	Drama.
1994	FR Yugoslavia	Vukovar: A Story	Вуковар, једна прича Vukovar, jedna priča	Boro Drašković	Drama, Romance. Battle of Vukovar
1995	Croatia	My Dear Angel	Anđele moj dragi	Tomislav Radić	Drama. Orphan during the war
1996	Croatia	How the War Started on My Island	Kako je počeo rat na mom otoku	Vinko Brešan	Comedy. Battle of the Barracks
1997	Italy	The Game Bag	Il carniere	Maurizio Zaccaro	Drama.
1998	Croatia	In the environment	U okruženju	Stjepan Sabljak	Action, Drama, War.
1999	Croatia	In the environment II	U okruženju II	Stjepan Sabljak	Drama, War.
1999	Croatia	Dubrovnik Twilight	Dubrovački suton	Željko Senečić	Drama. Siege of Dubrovnik
1999	Croatia	Madonna	Bogorodica	Neven Hitrec	Drama.
2000	France	Harrison's Flowers		Elie Chouraqui	Drama, Romance. Aftermath Battle of Vukovar
2001	Germany; Croatia; Hungary; Chile	Chico		Ibolya Fekete	Drama. Eduardo Rózsa-Flores
2006	Serbia and Montenegro	Sons of My Brothers	Синовци; Sinovci	Siniša Kovačević	Drama.
2008	Croatia	Remember Vukovar	Zapamtite Vukovar	Fadil Hadžić	Drama. Battle of Vukovar
2009	Croatia	The Blacks	Crnci	Goran Dević; Zvonimir Jurić	Crime, Drama. The killings of serb civilians during Battle of Osijek
2012	Slovenia	Generation 71	Generacija 71	Boštjan Slatenšek	Drama.
2014	Croatia	Number 55	Broj 55	Kristijan Milić	Battle of Kusonje
2019	Croatia		General	Antun Vrdoljak	Biography, Drama. Ante Gotovina biography
2022	Croatia	Sixth Bus	Šesti autobus	Eduard Galić	Drama, War. Battle of Vukovar
2025	Croatia; United States	260 Days	260 dana	Jakov Sedlar	Drama, Thriller, War.

== Ten-Day War in film ==
Year	Country	Main title (Alternative titles)	Original title (Original script)	Director	Battles, campaigns, events depicted
1996	France; Slovenia	Felix	Feliks	Božo Šprajc	Drama. A group of schoolchildren got into a shootout between the two sides in a motorcade during Ten-Day War

== Bosnian War in film ==
Year	Country	Main title (Alternative titles)	Original title (Original script)	Director	Battles, campaigns, events depicted
1994	Iran	Green Ashes	خاکستر سبز	Ebrahim Hatamikia	Drama.
1995	New Zealand	The Call Up		David Blyth	Drama.
1996	FR Yugoslavia	Pretty Village, Pretty Flame	Лепа села лепо горе Lepa sela lepo gore	Srđan Dragojević	Comedy, Drama. Soldiers army of Republika Srpska during the war
1998	United States	Tactical Assault		Mark Griffiths	Thriller. Operation Deliberate Force
1998	United States	Savior		Predrag Antonijević	Drama.
1998	Poland	Demons of War	Demony wojny według Goi	Władysław Pasikowski	Drama. Polish soldiers of the Implementation Force in Bosnia
2000	Denmark	Foreign Fields	På fremmed mark	Aage Rais	Drama
2001	United States	Behind Enemy Lines		John Moore	Drama, Thriller. Scott O'Grady
2001	Bosnia and Herzegovina; France; Slovenia; Italy; United Kingdom; Belgium	No Man's Land		Danis Tanović	Comedy, Drama.
2004	United States; Aruba	Unstoppable		David Carson	Action, Adventure, Drama, Thriller.
2008	Canada; Bosnia and Herzegovina	Dretelj		Denis Cviticanin	Drama.
2009	France; Serbia; Netherlands; Switzerland	Ordinary People		Vladimir Perišić	Drama.
2011	Bosnia and Herzegovina; United Kingdom	1395 Days Without Red	1395 dana bez crvene	Šejla Kamerić; Anri Sala	Drama. Sniper Alley, Siege of Sarajevo
2011	United States	In the Land of Blood and Honey		Angelina Jolie	Drama, Romance.
2013	United States; Belgium; Bulgaria	Killing Season		Mark Steven Johnson	Drama, Thriller.
2017	France; Germany; United States; Belgium; Malta; Croatia; Netherlands	Renegades		Steven Quale	Adventure, Crime, Drama, Thriller.
2019	Canada; France; Belgium	Sympathy for the Devil	Sympathie pour le diable	Guillaume de Fontenay	
2020	Bosnia and Herzegovina; Romania; Austria; Netherlands; Germany; Poland; France; Norway; Turkey	Quo Vadis, Aida?		Jasmila Žbanić	Drama. Srebrenica massacre
2021	United Kingdom	Penitent		Martin Webster	War.
2023	Serbia	Storm	Олуја; Oluja	Miloš Radunović	Drama, War. Operation Storm
2024	Croatia; Bosnia and Herzegovina	The Wrath of God	Božji gnjev	Kristijan Milić	Crime, Thriller, War.

== Kosovo War in film ==
Year	Country	Main title (Alternative titles)	Original title (Original script)	Director	Battles, campaigns, events depicted
2002	Spain	Warriors	Guerreros	Daniel Calparsoro	Adventure, Drama. Spanish soldiers Kosovo Force
2004	Italy		Radio West	Alessandro Valori	Drama. Italian soldiers of the Kosovo Force
2005	Kosovo; Germany	Anathema	Anatema	Agim Sopi	Drama. A woman was raped during the war
2007	Germany	Snipers Valley	Mörderischer Frieden	Rudolf Schweiger	Drama. Soldiers of the Kosovo Force
2010	Italy	Dirty War	Le ultime 56 ore	Claudio Fragasso	Drama. Consequences after the use of shells with depleted uranium in NATO bombing of Yugoslavia
2012	Kosovo	Agnus Dei		Agim Sopi	Drama, Family.
2012	Kosovo	Code of live	Kodi i jetës	Ekrem Kryeziu	
2014	Kosovo	Azemi		Rrahman Fetahu	
2017	Albania	Distant Angels	Ëngjëjt janë larg	Gjergj Xhuvani	Drama.
2017	Kosovo	Fields of War	Kësulat	Alan M. Trow; Arbër Krasniqi	Drama.
2019	Russia; Serbia	The Balkan Line	Балканский рубеж	Andrey Volgin	

== Uncategorized war films ==
Year	Country	Main title (Alternative titles)	Original title (Original script)	Director	Battles, campaigns, events depicted
1991	Yugoslavia	A Night at My Mother's House	Ноћ у кући моје мајке Noć u kući moje majke	Žarko Dragojević	Drama. Life at the beginning of the collapse of Yugoslavia
1994	Italy	The Bull	Il toro	Carlo Mazzacurati	Comedy, Drama.
1995	FR Yugoslavia; Bulgaria; Czech Republic; France; Germany; Hungary; United Kingdom; United States	Underground		Emir Kusturica	Comedy, Drama.
1997	FR Yugoslavia; Greece	Balkan Rules	Балканска правила Balkanska pravila	Darko Bajić	Drama. Relations between Yugoslav, Serbian, and Croatian secret services before and during Yugoslav Wars
1998	Canada	The Ultimate Weapon		Jon Cassar	Action.
1998	United States	Termination Man		Fred Gallo	Action, Drama.
1999	United States	Diplomatic Siege		Gustavo Graef-Marino	Action, Thriller.
2001	Denmark; United Kingdom; Czech Republic; Netherlands	The Zookeeper		Ralph Ziman	Drama, War.
2001	Sweden		Farligt förflutet	Oscar Petersson	Action, Crime, Drama, Thriller.
2002	United States		Frogmen Operation Stormbringer	Franklin A. Vallette	Action.
2003	Austria; Serbia and Montenegro	Yu		Franz Novotny	
2004	Italy	No problem	Nema problema	Giancarlo Bocchi	Drama.
2005	North Macedonia; Italy; United Kingdom	Bal-Can-Can	Бал-Кан-Кан	Darko Mitrevski	Action, Adventure, Comedy, Crime, Drama, War.
2005	Croatia	Two Players from the Bench	Dva igrača s klupe	Dejan Šorak	Comedy.
2006	Serbia	Claused Freedom	Условна слобода Uslovna sloboda	Miroslav Živanović	Comedy, Thriller.
2006	Czech Republic	Born Into Shit	Po hlavě do prdele	Marcel Bystroň	Comedy, Drama.
2007	Romania	California Dreamin' (endless)	California Dreamin' (nesfârșit)	Cristian Nemescu	Comedy, Drama.
2010	Norway; Sweden; Germany	Home for Christmas	Hjem til jul	Bent Hamer	Comedy, Drama.
2010	Canada	Snow and Ashes		Charles-Olivier Michaud	Drama, Thriller.
2011	Slovenia; Ireland; Finland; Sweden	Silent Sonata	Circus Fantasticus	Janez Burger	Drama. Family life during the war
2011	Slovenia; Bulgaria; Serbia; Bosnia and Herzegovina; North Macedonia	The State of Shock	Stanje šoka	Andrej Košak	Comedy, Drama.
2013	North Macedonia	My Father		Shqipe N. Duka	Drama.
2015	Spain	A Perfect Day		Fernando León de Aranoa	Comedy, Drama.
2015	Russia; Serbia	Brother Deyan	Брат Дэян; Брат Дејан; Brat Dejan	Bakur Bakuradze	Drama.
2016	Croatia; Serbia; Bosnia and Herzegovina	A Good Wife	Добра жена Dobra žena	Mirjana Karanović	Drama.
2017	Serbia; United States	An Ordinary Man		Brad Silberling	Drama, Thriller, War.
2018	United Kingdom; United States	In Darkness		Anthony Byrne	Mystery, Thriller.
2018	Switzerland; North Macedonia; Ireland	The Witness		Mitko Panov	Action, Drama.

== Croatia in the Yugoslav Wars films ==
Year	Country	Main title (Alternative titles)	Original title (Original script)	Director	Battles, campaigns, events depicted
1994	Croatia	The Price of Life	Cijena života	Bogdan Žižić	Drama.
1995	Croatia	Washed Out	Isprani	Zrinko Ogresta	Drama, Romance.
1995	Croatia	A Journey Through the Dark Side	Putovanje tamnom polutkom	Davor Žmegač	Drama.
1996	Croatia	Calvary	Kalvarija	Zvonimir Maycug	Drama, Romance, Thriller.
1997	Croatia	Tranquilizer Gun	Puška za uspavljivanje	Hrvoje Hribar	Crime, Thriller.
1997	Croatia	Russian Meat	Rusko meso	Lukas Nola	Crime, Thriller.
1997	Croatia	The Third Woman	Treća žena	Zoran Tadić	Mystery, Thriller. Zagreb during the war
1998	Croatia	The Three Men of Melita Žganjer	Tri muškarca Melite Žganjer	Snježana Tribuson	Comedy, Romance.
1998	Croatia	When the Dead Start Singing	Kad mrtvi zapjevaju	Krsto Papić	Comedy, Drama.
1998	Croatia	Delusion	Zavaravanje	Željko Senečić	Drama.
1998	Croatia	Canyon of Dangerous Games	Kanjon opasnih igara	Vladimir Tadej	Adventure.
1999	Croatia	Wish I Were a Shark	Da mi je biti morski pas	Ognjen Sviličić	Comedy.
1999	Croatia	Garcia		Dejan Šorak	Drama.
1999	Croatia	Red Dust	Crvena prašina	Zrinko Ogresta	Crime, Drama, Thriller. Zagreb during the war
2000	Croatia	The Old Oak Blues	Srce nije u modi	Branko Schmidt	Comedy, Drama.
2000	Croatia	The Thread of Life	Nit života	Igor Filipović-Fila	Drama.
2001	Croatia	Slow Surrender	Polagana predaja	Bruno Gamulin	
2002	Croatia	Winter in Rio	Prezimiti u Riju	Davor Žmegač	Comedy, Drama.
2002	Croatia	Fine Dead Girls	Fine mrtve djevojke	Dalibor Matanić	Drama, Thriller.
2003	Croatia; Bosnia and Herzegovina	Here	Tu	Zrinko Ogresta	Drama.
2003	Croatia	Mercy of the Sea	Milost mora	Dominik Sedlar; Jakov Sedlar	Drama.
2003	Croatia	Witnesses	Svjedoci	Vinko Brešan	Drama.
2004	Croatia	Sorry for Kung Fu	Oprosti za kung fu	Ognjen Sviličić	Drama.
2004	United Kingdom; Switzerland; Spain; Italy; France	Mathilde		Nina Mimica	Drama.
2005	Croatia	What Is a Man Without a Moustache?	Što je muškarac bez brkova?	Hrvoje Hribar	Comedy, Drama, Romance.
2006	Croatia	The Melon Route	Put lubenica	Branko Schmidt	Drama.
2007	Croatia	The Recollection Thief	Kradljivac uspomena	Vicko Ruić	Crime.
2008	Croatia; Serbia	Will Not End Here	Nije kraj	Vinko Brešan	Comedy, Drama, Romance, War.
2008	Croatia; Slovenia	No One's Son	Ničiji sin	Arsen Anton Ostojić	Crime, Drama.
2009	Croatia; Bosnia and Herzegovina; Serbia	Metastases	Metastaze	Branko Schmidt	Crime, Drama, Sport.
2011	Croatia	Step by Step	Korak po korak	Biljana Čakić-Veselič	Drama.
2013	Croatia; Bosnia and Herzegovina	A Stranger	Obrana i zaštita	Bobo Jelčić	Drama.
2014	Croatia; Slovenia	The Reaper	Kosac	Zvonimir Jurić	Drama.
2014	Croatia; Serbia; Bosnia and Herzegovina; France	The Bridge at the End of the World	Most na kraju svijeta	Branko Ištvančić	Drama, Thriller.
2014	Switzerland; Croatia; Bosnia and Herzegovina	Cure: The Life of Another	Cure - Život druge	Andrea Štaka	Drama, Mystery, Thriller, War.
2015	Croatia; Serbia; Slovenia	The High Sun	Zvizdan	Dalibor Matanić	Drama, Romance.
2016	Croatia	Wasn't Afraid to Die	Nisam se bojao umrijeti	Jakov Sedlar	Biography, Crime, Drama, History, War.
2016	Croatia; Serbia	On the Other Side	S one strane	Zrinko Ogresta	Drama. Refugees in Zagreb
2017	Croatia; Bosnia and Herzegovina	Dead fish	Mrtve ribe	Kristijan Milić	Drama.
2019	Croatia; Serbia; Poland	What a Country!	Koja je ovo država!	Vinko Brešan	Comedy, Drama.
2021	Croatia; Bosnia and Herzegovina	And we were good to you	A bili smo vam dobri	Branko Schmidt	Drama, Thriller.
2022	Croatia	The head of a big fish	Glava velike ribe	Arsen Oremović	Drama.
2022	Croatia	Even Pigs Go to Heaven	Nosila je rubac črleni	Goran Dukić	Comedy.
2025	Croatia	Taxi Love	Taxi ljubav	Milo Ostović	Drama.
2025	Canada	Out Standing	Seule au front	Mélanie Charbonneau	Biography, Drama, History, War.

== Bosnia in the Yugoslav Wars films ==
Year	Country	Main title (Alternative titles)	Original title (Original script)	Director	Battles, campaigns, events depicted
1995	Greece; France; Italy; Germany; United Kingdom; FR Yugoslavia; Romania; Albania; Bosnia and Herzegovina	Ulysses' Gaze	Το βλέμμα του Οδυσσέα	Theo Angelopoulos	Drama. Siege of Sarajevo
1996	France; Switzerland	For Ever Mozart		Jean-Luc Godard	Comedy, Drama.
1997	United States	The Peacemaker		Mimi Leder	Thriller.
1997	Bosnia and Herzegovina; France	The Perfect Circle	Savršeni krug	Ademir Kenović	Drama.
1997	United Kingdom; United States	Welcome to Sarajevo		Michael Winterbottom	Drama.
1997	Spain; France; Argentina; German	Comanche Territory	Territorio Comanche	Gerardo Herrero	Drama. Spanish TV reporters covering the War in Bosnia
1998	Italy	Rehearsals for War	Teatro di guerra	Mario Martone	Drama.
1998	Bosnia and Herzegovina; France	An Unexpected Walk	Neočekivana šetnja	François Lunel	
1999	France; Bosnia and Herzegovina	Heroes		François Lunel	Drama.
1999	FR Yugoslavia	The Dagger	Нож; Nož	Miroslav Lekić	Drama.
2000	Bosnia and Herzegovina	Tunel		Faruk Sokolović	Drama.
2002	Poland; United Kingdom; Germany; United States	Where Eskimos Live		Tomasz Wiszniewski	Drama.
2003	Bosnia and Herzegovina; France; Turkey	Remake		Dino Mustafić	Drama.
2003	Bosnia and Herzegovina; France; United Kingdom	Summer in the Golden Valley	Ljeto u zlatnoj dolini	Srđan Vuletić	Drama. Sarajevo after Bosnian War
2003	France	Quiet days in Sarajevo	Jours tranquilles à Sarajevo	François Lunel	Drama.
2003	Bosnia and Herzegovina; Austria; Turkey; France	Fuse	Gori vatra	Pjer Žalica	Comedy, Drama. Bosnian War aftermath
2004	Serbia and Montenegro; France; Italy	Life Is a Miracle	Живот је чудо Život je čudo	Emir Kusturica	Comedy, Romance, Music, Drama.
2004	France; Switzerland	Our Music	Notre musique	Jean-Luc Godard	Drama.
2004	Bosnia and Herzegovina	Days and Hours	Kod amidže Idriza	Pjer Žalica	Drama.
2004	Bosnia and Herzegovina	Ahead of the Front Line	Ispred prve linije	Dragan Elčić	
2005	Slovenia; France; Italy; Bosnia and Herzegovina	Well Tempered Corpses	Dobro uštimani mrtvaci	Benjamin Filipović	Comedy, Drama.
2005	Bosnia and Herzegovina	Go West		Ahmed Imamović	Comedy, Drama, Western. Gays during the Bosnian war
2006	Bosnia and Herzegovina	Nafaka		Jasmin Duraković	Comedy. Siege of Sarajevo
2006	Bosnia and Herzegovina; Croatia; Austria; Germany	Grbavica		Jasmila Žbanić	Drama.
2006	Croatia; Bosnia and Herzegovina; Serbia and Montenegro	All for Free	Sve džaba	Antonio Nuić	Comedy, Drama.
2007	Serbia	The Fourth Man	Четврти човек Četvrti čovek	Dejan Zečević	Adventure, Mystery, Romance, Thriller.
2007	United States; Croatia; Bosnia and Herzegovina	The Hunting Party		Richard Shepard	Adventure, Comedy, Drama, Romance, Thriller.
2007	United Kingdom	Mine		Xavier Leret	Drama.
2007	Croatia; Bosnia and Herzegovina; Germany	Armin		Ognjen Sviličić	Drama.
2008	Serbia; Bosnia and Herzegovina; Croatia; Slovenia	The Tour	Турнеја; Turneja	Goran Marković	Adventure, Comedy. Theatrical troupe during the war
2008	Bosnia and Herzegovina; Germany; France; Iran	Snow	Snijeg	Aida Begić	Drama.
2009	Croatia; Bosnia and Herzegovina; United Kingdom; Serbia	Donkey	Kenjac	Antonio Nuić	Drama.
2009	Croatia; Hungary	In the Land of Wonders	U zemlji čudesa	Dejan Šorak	Drama.
2009	Germany; Netherlands; Denmark; Sweden; Bosnia and Herzegovina	Storm		Hans-Christian Schmid	Drama.
2010	Bosnia and Herzegovina; France; United Kingdom; Germany; Slovenia; Belgium; Serbia	Cirkus Columbia		Danis Tanović	Comedy, Drama, Romance.
2010	Canada; Germany; United States	The Whistleblower		Larysa Kondracki	Biography, Crime, Drama.
2010	Bosnia and Herzegovina; Austria; Germany; Croatia	On the Path	Na putu	Jasmila Žbanić	Drama.
2010	Bosnia and Herzegovina	Belvedere		Ahmed Imamović	Drama.
2010	Ireland; Sweden; North Macedonia	As If I Am Not There	Као да ме нема Kao da me nema	Juanita Wilson	Drama.
2010	Bosnia and Herzegovina; Croatia; France; Serbia; United States	The Abandoned	Ostavljeni	Adis Bakrač	Drama.
2010	Bosnia and Herzegovina	Jasmina		Nedžad Begović	Drama.
2010	Bosnia and Herzegovina	Yearning for Karim	Sevdah za Karima	Jasmin Duraković	Drama.
2010	Serbia; Bosnia and Herzegovina		Мотел Нана; Motel Nana	Predrag Velinović	Drama.
2012	Bosnia and Herzegovina; Austria	Body Complete		Lukas Sturm	Drama, Thriller.
2012	Bosnia and Herzegovina; Croatia; Slovenia	Halima's Path	Halimin put	Arsen Anton Ostojić	Drama.
2012	Italy; Spain	Twice Born	Venuto al mondo	Sergio Castellitto	Drama, Romance.
2012	Canada; Bosnia and Herzegovina	Krivina		Igor Drljaca	Drama.
2012	Bosnia and Herzegovina; Germany; France; Turkey	Children of Sarajevo	Djeca	Aida Begić	Drama.
2013	Bosnia and Herzegovina	I Am from Krajina, the Land of Chestnuts	Ja sam iz Krajine, zemlje kestena	Jasmin Duraković	Drama.
2013	Serbia; Germany; France; Slovenia; Croatia	Circles	Кругови; Krugovi	Srdan Golubović	Drama.
2013	Turkey; Bosnia and Herzegovina	Crossroads	Üç Yol	Faysal Soysal	Drama, Mystery, War.
2013	Bosnia and Herzegovina; Qatar; Germany	For Those Who Can Tell No Tales	Za one koji ne mogu da govore	Jasmila Žbanić	Drama.
2014	Bosnia and Herzegovina	Politics and Other Crimes	Politika i drugi zločini	Kenan Musić	Drama, Thriller.
2014	France	Irina, the Scarlet Briefcase	Irina, la mallette rouge	Bernard Mazauric	Drama.
2014	Serbia; Croatia	No One's Child	Ничије дете Ničije dete	Vuk Ršumović	Drama.
2015	Bosnia and Herzegovina; Slovenia; Croatia	Our Everyday Life	Naša svakodnevna priča	Ines Tanović	Drama, Family.
2015	United States; Bosnia and Herzegovina; Croatia; Italy; Switzerland	All That Remains		Marko Slavnić	Drama.
2015	Serbia; Bosnia and Herzegovina	So Hot Was the Cannon	Топ је био врео Top je bio vreo	Slobodan Skerlić	Drama. Siege of Sarajevo
2015	Bosnia and Herzegovina; United States	Sabina K.		Cristóbal Krusen	Drama.
2015	United States; Turkey; Serbia; Bosnia and Herzegovina	Seasons of War		Seda Eğridere	Drama.
2015	Croatia	Cherry names	Imena višnje	Branko Schmidt	Drama.
2016	Italy; France	Sweet Dreams	Fai bei sogni	Marco Bellocchio	Drama, Romance.
2016	Turkey; Bosnia and Herzegovina; Serbia	My Mother's Wound	Annemin Yarası	Ozan Açıktan	Drama, Mystery.
2017	Bosnia and Herzegovina; Slovenia; Germany; Croatia	Men Don't Cry	Muškarci ne plaču	Alen Drljević	Drama.
2017	Bosnia and Herzegovina; Iran	Songs of wind	آوازهای باد	Mohsen Sohani	Drama.
2017	Poland; Bosnia and Herzegovina; Croatia	Catalina		Denijal Hasanović	Drama.
2018	Portugal; Bosnia and Herzegovina	The Tree	A Árvore	André Gil Mata	Drama, War.
2019	Bosnia and Herzegovina; United States	Majnuni		Kouros Alaghband; Drew Hoffman	Drama, Thriller.
2019	France; Belgium; Bosnia and Herzegovina	Heroes never die	Les héros ne meurent jamais	Aude Léa Rapin	Drama.
2020	Bosnia and Herzegovina; France	Those Dark Nights	Te mračne noći	François Lunel	Drama, War.
2020	Bosnia and Herzegovina; Turkey	Focus, Grandma	Koncentriši se, baba	Pjer Žalica	Comedy, Drama.
2021	Turkey	Sakli Yüzler: Bosna		Haktan Özkan; Gökhan Tunaligil	Action, Drama.
2022	Bosnia and Herzegovina	Labor Day	Praznik rada	Pjer Žalica	Drama.
2022	North Macedonia; Denmark; Belgium; Slovenia; Croatia; Bosnia and Herzegovina	The Happiest Man in the World	Најсреќниот човек на светот	Teona Strugar Mitevska	Drama.
2024	Bosnia and Herzegovina; Serbia; Croatia	When Santa Was a Communist	Djeda Mraz u Bosni	Emir Kapetanović	Comedy, Drama.

== Serbia in the Yugoslav Wars films ==
Year	Country	Main title (Alternative titles)	Original title (Original script)	Director	Battles, campaigns, events depicted
1992	FR Yugoslavia	Lady Killer	Дама која убија Dama koja ubija	Zoran Čalić	Comedy, Crime.
1992	FR Yugoslavia	The Jews Are Coming	Јевреји долазе Jevreji dolaze	Prvoslav Marić	Drama.
1992	FR Yugoslavia	The Black Bomber	Црни бомбардер Crni bombarder	Darko Bajić	Drama. Belgrade during Yugoslav Wars
1992	FR Yugoslavia	Boulevard of the Revolution	Булевар револуције Bulevar revolucije	Vladimir Blaževski	Drama. Belgrade during Yugoslav Wars
1993	FR Yugoslavia	Say Why Have You Left Me	Кажи зашто ме остави Kaži zašto me ostavi	Oleg Novković	Drama. Battle of Vukovar
1994	FR Yugoslavia	A Diary of Insults	Дневник увреда 1993; Dnevnik uvreda 1993	Zdravko Šotra	Drama. Life in Serbia during the Yugoslav wars
1994	FR Yugoslavia	In the Middle of Nowhere	Ни на небу, ни на земљи Ni na nebu, ni na zemlji	Miloš Radivojević	Drama. Belgrade during Yugoslav Wars
1995	FR Yugoslavia	Terrace on the Roof	Тераса на крову Terasa na krovu	Gordan Mihić	Drama, Romance.
1995	FR Yugoslavia	Marble Ass	Дупе од мрамора Dupe od mramora	Želimir Žilnik	Comedy, Drama. Belgrade during Yugoslav Wars
1995	FR Yugoslavia	The Night Is Dark	Тамна је ноћ Tamna je noć	Dragan Kresoja	Drama. Belgrade during Yugoslav Wars
1995	FR Yugoslavia	Premeditated Murder	Убиство с предумишљајем Ubistvo s predumišljajem	Gorčin Stojanović	Drama, Romance.
1996	FR Yugoslavia	Goodbye in Chicago	Довиђења у Чикагу; Doviđenja u Čikagu	Zoran Čalić	Comedy, Crime.
1997	FR Yugoslavia	Tango Is a Sad Thought to Be Danced	Танго је тужна мисао која се плеше Tango je tužna misao koja se pleše	Puriša Đorđević	Drama.
1997	FR Yugoslavia	Rage	До коске Do koske	Slobodan Skerlić	Action.
1997	FR Yugoslavia	Flashback	Враћање; Vraćanje	Gordana Boškov	Drama. The life of a boxer during the Yugoslav wars
1997	FR Yugoslavia	Three Summer Days	Три летња дана Tri letnja dana	Mirjana Vukomanović	Drama. Belgrade during Yugoslav Wars
1998	FR Yugoslavia	Thief's Comeback	Повратак лопова Povratak lopova	Miroslav Lekić	Comedy.
1998	France; Germany; FR Yugoslavia; Austria; Greece	Black Cat, White Cat	Црна мачка, бели мачор Crna mačka, beli mačor	Emir Kusturica	Comedy, Crime, Romance.
1998	FR Yugoslavia	Wheels	Точкови; Točkovi	Đorđe Milosavljević	Comedy, Drama, Thriller.
1998	FR Yugoslavia	Buy Me an Eliot	Купи ми Елиота; Kupi mi Eliota	Dejan Zečević	Comedy.
1998	FR Yugoslavia; Italy; Bulgaria	The Hornet	Стршљен; Stršljen	Gorčin Stojanović	Crime, Drama, Romance, Thriller.
1998	FR Yugoslavia; Germany	The Wounds	Ране; Rane	Srđan Dragojević	Comedy, Crime, Drama. Belgrade during Yugoslav Wars
1998	FR Yugoslavia	Three Palms for Two Punks and a Babe	Три палме за две битанге и рибицу Tri palme za dve bitange i ribicu	Radivoje Andrić	Comedy.
1998	FR Yugoslavia; North Macedonia; France; Greece; Turkey	Cabaret Balkan	Буре барута Bure baruta	Goran Paskaljević	Drama. Belgrade during Yugoslav Wars
1999	FR Yugoslavia	Wounded Land	Рањена земља Ranjena zemlja	Dragoslav Lazić	Drama. NATO bombing of Yugoslavia
1999	FR Yugoslavia; United Kingdom	The White Suit	Бело одело Belo odelo	Lazar Ristovski	Comedy, Drama, Romance.
2000	FR Yugoslavia	The Secret of Family Treasures	Тајна породичног блага Tajna porodičnog blaga	Aleksandar Đorđević	Comedy.
2000	FR Yugoslavia	Dorcol-Manhattan	Дорћол-Менхетн; Dorćol-Menhetn	Isidora Bjelica	Comedy, Drama, Romance.
2000	FR Yugoslavia	The Mechanism	Механизам; Mehanizam	Đorđe Milosavljević	Action, Crime.
2000	FR Yugoslavia	War Live	Рат уживо Rat uživo	Darko Bajić	Comedy, Drama. NATO bombing of Yugoslavia
2000	FR Yugoslavia	Sky Hook	Небеска удица Nebeska udica	Ljubiša Samardžić	Drama. NATO bombing of Yugoslavia
2000	FR Yugoslavia	Land of Truth, Love & Freedom	Земља истине, љубави и слободе Zemlja istine, ljubavi i slobode	Milutin Petrović	Drama. NATO bombing of Yugoslavia
2001	FR Yugoslavia	Peasants	Сељаци; Seljaci	Dragoslav Lazić	Comedy.
2001	FR Yugoslavia	Dudes	Муње! Munje!	Radivoje Andrić	Comedy.
2001	FR Yugoslavia	Boomerang	Бумеранг; Bumerang	Dragan Marinković	Comedy, Crime, Mystery, Romance.
2001	FR Yugoslavia	Natasha	Наташа; Nataša	Ljubiša Samardžić	Drama, Comedy, Crime, Romance.
2001	FR Yugoslavia	Absolute 100	Апсолутних сто Apsolutnih sto	Srdan Golubović	Crime, Drama, Thriller.
2001	FR Yugoslavia	Normal People	Нормални људи Normalni ljudi	Oleg Novković	Drama. Belgrade after Yugoslav Wars
2002	FR Yugoslavia	One on One	Један на један Jedan na jedan	Mladen Matičević	Drama.
2002	FR Yugoslavia	Frozen Stiff	Мртав ’ладан Mrtav ’ladan	Milorad Milinković	Comedy, Drama.
2002	FR Yugoslavia	The Cordon	Кордон; Kordon	Goran Marković	Action, Drama. 1996–1997 Serbian protests
2003	Serbia and Montenegro	Small World	Мали свет Mali svet	Miloš Radović	Comedy.
2003	Austria; Serbia and Montenegro	011 Belgrade	011 Београд; 011 Beograd	Mihael Fainferberger	Drama.
2003	Serbia and Montenegro	The Professional	Професионалац; Profesionalac	Dušan Kovačević	Comedy, Drama. Belgrade during Yugoslav Wars
2003	Serbia and Montenegro; Germany; North Macedonia; Italy	Strawberries in the Supermarket	Јагода у супермаркету Jagoda u supermarketu	Dušan Milić	Action, Comedy, Adventure, Romance.
2004	Serbia and Montenegro	Falling in the Paradise	Пад у рај Pad u raj	Miloš Radović	Comedy. NATO bombing of Yugoslavia
2004	Serbia and Montenegro	Fellowship Offerings	Да није љубави, не би свита било Da nije ljubavi, ne bi svita bilo	Karolj Viček	Drama. NATO bombing of Yugoslavia
2004	Serbia and Montenegro; Germany; Slovenia	The Red Colored Grey Truck	Сиви камион црвене боје Sivi kamion crvene boje	Srđan Koljević	Adventure, Comedy, Romance.
2004	Serbia and Montenegro	Party	Журка; Žurka	Aleksandar Davić	Drama.
2005	Serbia and Montenegro	Awakening from the Dead	Буђење из мртвих Buđenje iz mrtvih	Miloš Radivojević	Drama. NATO bombing of Yugoslavia
2006	Serbia	Seven and a Half	Седам и по Sedam i po	Miroslav Momčilović	Comedy, Drama.
2007	Serbia; Germany; Hungary	The Trap	Клопка; Klopka	Srdan Golubović	Crime, Drama, Thriller.
2008	Serbia	Lost and Found	Биро за изгубљене ствари Biro za izgubljene stvari	Svetislav Bata Prelić	Comedy, Drama.
2009	Serbia	Autumn in My Street	Јесен у мојој улици Jesen u mojoj ulici	Miloš Pušić	Comedy, Drama.
2009	France	Human Zoo		Rie Rasmussen	Drama.
2009	Serbia	The Ambulance	Хитна помоћ Hitna pomoć	Goran Radovanović	Drama.
2011	Serbia	The Box	Кутија; Kutija	Andrijana Stojković	Drama. Belgrade during Yugoslav Wars
2011	Serbia; Slovenia; Croatia; France; North Macedonia; United Kingdom	The Parade	Парада; Parada	Srđan Dragojević	Comedy, Drama, History, Romance.
2012	Serbia	Redemption Street	Устаничка улица Ustanička ulica	Miroslav Terzić	Drama, Thriller.
2013	Serbia	Mamarosh	Мамарош; Mamaroš	Momčilo Mrdaković	Comedy, Drama. NATO bombing of Yugoslavia
2014	Serbia; Montenegro	Holidays in the Sun	Атомски здесна Atomski zdesna	Srđan Dragojević	Drama.
2015	Serbia; Netherlands; Belgium	The Sky Above Us		Marinus Groothof	Biography, Drama. NATO bombing of the Radio Television of Serbia headquarters, NATO bombing of Yugoslavia
2015	Serbia	The Healing	Исцељење; Isceljenje	Ivan Jović	Drama.
2015	Serbia	Patria	Отаџбина; Otadžbina	Oleg Novković	Drama.
2019	Serbia; Croatia; North Macedonia	Leeches	Пијавице; Pijavice	Dragan Marinković	Drama.
2021	Serbia	Celts	Келти; Kelti	Milica Tomović	Drama.
2023	Serbia	Coma	Кома; Koma	Petar Jakonić	Drama.
2023	Serbia	The Erl-King	Баук; Bauk	Goran Radovanović	Drama. NATO bombing of Yugoslavia
2023	Serbia; France; Croatia; Luxembourg	Lost Country		Vladimir Perišić	Drama. 1996–1997 Serbian protests
2024	Serbia	78 Days	78 дана 78 dana	Emilija Gašić	Drama. NATO bombing of Yugoslavia

== Montenegro in the Yugoslav Wars films ==
Year	Country	Main title (Alternative titles)	Original title (Original script)	Director	Battles, campaigns, events depicted
1997	FR Yugoslavia	Born Tomorrow	Рођени сјутра Rođeni sjutra	Draško Đurović	Drama, Action, Thriller.
1999	FR Yugoslavia	In the Name of Father and Son	У име оца и сина U ime oca i sina	Božidar Nikolić	Comedy, Drama.
2008	Montenegro	Landing at Prčevo	Десант на Прчево; Desant na Prčevo	Draško Đurović	Comedy.
2012	Montenegro	Ace of Spades: Bad Destiny	Ас пик - лоша судбина As pik - loša sudbina	Draško Đurović	Drama.
2014	Montenegro; Slovenia	The Kids from the Marx and Engels Street	Дечаци из улице Маркса и Енгелса; Dečaci iz ulice Marksa i Engelsa	Nikola Vukčević	Crime, Drama, Family.

== North Macedonia in the Yugoslav Wars films ==
Year	Country	Main title (Alternative titles)	Original title (Original script)	Director	Battles, campaigns, events depicted
1993	North Macedonia	Macedonian Saga	Македонска сага	Branko Gapo	Drama, Romance.
1994	North Macedonia; France; United Kingdom	Before the Rain	Пред дождот	Milcho Manchevski	Drama.
1995	North Macedonia	Angels of the Dumps	Ангели на отпад	Dimitrie Osmanli	Comedy.
1996	North Macedonia	Suicide Guide	Самоуништување	Erbil Altanay	Comedy.
1997	North Macedonia	Gypsy Magic	Џипси меџик	Stole Popov	Comedy, Drama.
2004	France; North Macedonia; Slovenia	How I Killed a Saint	Како убив светец	Teona Strugar Mitevska	Drama.
2004	North Macedonia	Mirage	Илузија	Svetozar Ristovski	Drama.
2007	North Macedonia; Croatia; Serbia	Upside Down	Превртено	Igor Ivanov Izi	Drama.
2007	North Macedonia; Belgium; France; Slovenia	I Am from Titov Veles	Јас сум од Титов Велес	Teona Strugar Mitevska	Drama.
2015	North Macedonia	Honey Night	Медена ноќ	Ivo Trajkov	Drama, Thriller.
2019	North Macedonia	Second Chance	Втора шанса	Marija Džidževa	Drama.

== Kosovo in the Yugoslav Wars films ==
Year	Country	Main title (Alternative titles)	Original title (Original script)	Director	Battles, campaigns, events depicted
2005	Bosnia and Herzegovina	The Kukumi	Kukumi	Isa Qosja	Drama. Kosovo War aftermath
2006	Germany	Kosova: Desperate Search	Etjet e Kosovës	Sunaj Raça	Drama, War.
2012	Germany	My Beautiful Country	Die Brücke am Ibar	Michaela Kezele	Drama, Romance.
2014	Kosovo	Three Windows and a Hanging	Tri dritare dhe një varje	Isa Qosja	Drama.
2014	Kosovo	The Hero		Luan Kryeziu	Drama. Kosovo War aftermath
2015	Germany; Serbia	Enclave	Енклава; Enklava	Goran Radovanović	Drama. Kosovo War aftermath
2015	Germany; Kosovo; North Macedonia; France	Father	Babai	Visar Morina	Drama.
2016	Serbia	Agreement	Споразум; Sporazum	Predrag Radonjić	Drama. Kosovo War aftermath
2018	Serbia; France; Croatia; Iran; Qatar	The Load	Терет; Teret	Ognjen Glavonić	Drama. NATO bombing of Yugoslavia
2019	Kosovo	Flying Circus	Cirku Fluturues	Fatos Berisha	Drama.
2020	Germany	Kill Me Today, Tomorrow I'm Sick!		Joachim Schroeder; Tobias Streck	Comedy, Drama.
2021	Finland	Bolla		Milja Sarkola	Drama.
2021	Kosovo; Switzerland; Albania; North Macedonia	Hive	Zgjoi	Blerta Basholli	Drama.
2025	Kosovo	The Odyssey of Joy	Odiseja e Gëzimit	Zgjim Terziqi	Drama.

== Refugees, Migrants ==
Year	Country	Main title (Alternative titles)	Original title (Original script)	Director	Battles, campaigns, events depicted
1991	France; Greece; Switzerland; Italy	The Suspended Step of the Stork	Το Mετέωρο Bήμα Tου Πελαργού	Theo Angelopoulos	Drama, Romance.
1994	Croatia	Vukovar: The Way Home	Vukovar se vraća kući	Branko Schmidt	Drama.
1995	FR Yugoslavia; United Kingdom; France; Germany; Greece	Someone Else's America	Туђа Америка; Tuđa Amerika	Goran Paskaljević	Comedy, Drama.
1995	Italy	One child too many	Una bambina di troppo	Damiano Damiani	Drama.
1996	Denmark; Sweden		Belma	Lars Hesselholdt	Drama.
1996	New Zealand	Broken English		Gregor Nicholas	Drama, Romance.
1997	Austria	Jugofilm		Goran Rebić	Drama.
1997	Croatia	Christmas in Vienna	Božić u Beču	Branko Schmidt	Drama.
1999	Austria; Germany; Switzerland	Northern Skirts	Nordrand	Barbara Albert	Drama.
1999	United Kingdom	Beautiful People		Jasmin Dizdar	Comedy, Drama. Bosnian refugees in London
2000	Bosnia and Herzegovina	Milky Way	Mliječni put	Faruk Sokolović	Drama.
2001	United States; FR Yugoslavia	Burn		Vladan Nikolić	Drama, Thriller, War.
2002	FR Yugoslavia	The State of the Dead	Держава мертвих Država mrtvih	Živojin Pavlović; Dinko Tucaković	Crime, Drama.
2002	United States	Lana's Rain		Michael S. Ojeda	Drama.
2003	Serbia and Montenegro	Bare Ground	Ледина; Ledina	Ljubiša Samardžić	Drama.
2003	North Macedonia; Croatia; Italy; United Kingdom	Like a Bad Dream	Како лош сон	Antonio Mitrikeski	Drama.
2003	Serbia and Montenegro; United Kingdom; North Macedonia	Loving Glances	Сјај у очима Sjaj u očima	Srđan Karanović	Drama, Romance.
2004	Spain; Serbia and Montenegro; Monaco	Midwinter Night's Dream	Сан зимске ноћи San zimske noći	Goran Paskaljević	Drama.
2004	Serbia and Montenegro	Take a Deep Breath	Диши дубоко Diši duboko	Dragan Marinković	Drama, Romance.
2004	Switzerland; Belgium; Poland	One Long Winter Without Fire	Tout un hiver sans feu Cała zima bez ognia	Grzegorz Zgliński	Drama.
2005	United States; Serbia and Montenegro	Love		Vladan Nikolic	Drama, Thriller.
2005	Sweden	Made in YU		Miko Lazić	Drama, Action.
2005	Spain; Ireland	The Secret Life of Words		Isabel Coixet	Drama, Romance.
2005	Serbia and Montenegro; Canada	Balkan Brothers	Балканска браћа Balkanska braća	Božidar Nikolić	Comedy, Drama.
2006	Switzerland; Germany; Bosnia and Herzegovina	Das Fräulein		Andrea Štaka	Drama.
2006	Germany; Slovenia	Warchild	Stille Sehnsucht	Christian Wagner	Drama.
2006	Serbia	Heart's Affair	Ствар срца Stvar srca	Miroslav Aleksić	Drama, Romance.
2008	Croatia; Germany; Bosnia and Herzegovina; United States; United Kingdom; South Africa	Buick Riviera		Goran Rušinović	Drama.
2009	United States	Serbian Scars	Српски ожиљци Srpski ožiljci	Brent Haf	Action, Drama, Thriller, War.
2010	Switzerland; North Macedonia	The War Is Over		Mitko Panov	Drama.
2012	Serbia		Јелена, Катарина, Марија; Jelena, Katarina, Marija	Nikita Milivojević	Drama.
2014	Mexico	Manuela Jankovic's War	La guerra de Manuela Jankovic	Diana Cardozo	Drama.
2017	Kosovo; Netherlands	Unwanted	T'padashtun	Edon Rizvanolli	Drama, Romance.
2019	United States; Italy; Bosnia and Herzegovina	Nasumice (Adrift)		Caleb Burdeau	Drama.
2020	Germany; Belgium; Kosovo	Exile	Exil	Visar Morina	Drama, Mystery, Thriller.
2021	Bosnia and Herzegovina	My Mother’s Swedish Heart	Švedsko srce moje majke	Adis Bakrač	Drama.
2021	Croatia; Bosnia and Herzegovina	Children from CNN	Djeca sa CNN-a	Aida Bukvić	Drama.
2023	Croatia	Hotel Pula		Andrej Korovljev	Drama.
2023	Montenegro; Albania; Kosovo; Bosnia and Herzegovina	Sirin		Senad Šahmanović	Drama.

== Science fiction, fantasy, and horror films ==
=== Croatian War of Independence ===
Year	Country	Main title (Alternative titles)	Original title (Original script)	Director	Battles, campaigns, events depicted
2000	Croatia	Celestial Body	Nebo, sateliti	Lukas Nola	Drama, Fantasy.

=== Bosnian War ===
Year	Country	Main title (Alternative titles)	Original title (Original script)	Director	Battles, campaigns, events depicted
2007	Bosnia and Herzegovina; Croatia	The Living and the Dead	Živi i mrtvi	Kristijan Milić	Fantasy, Horror. Croatian Defence Council in Croat–Bosniak War
2011	Serbia; Bosnia and Herzegovina; Croatia; Hungary	The Enemy	Непријатељ; Neprijatelj	Dejan Zečević	Drama, Horror, Mystery, Thriller. A group of Republika Srpska soldiers after the signing of the armistice
2013	United Kingdom	The Seasoning House		Paul Hyett	Drama, Horror, Thriller.
2016	Argentina; Bosnia and Herzegovina; Serbia; Mexico; United States; United Kingdom	On the Milky Road	На млечном путу Na mlečnom putu	Emir Kusturica	Comedy, Drama, Fantasy, Romance.
2022	Italy	Dampyr		Riccardo Chemello	Fantasy, Horror.

=== Croatia in the Yugoslav Wars films ===
Year	Country	Main title (Alternative titles)	Original title (Original script)	Director	Battles, campaigns, events depicted
2002	Croatia	The Sunken Cemetery	Potonulo groblje	Mladen Juran	Horror, Thriller.

=== Bosnia in the Yugoslav Wars films ===
Year	Country	Main title (Alternative titles)	Original title (Original script)	Director	Battles, campaigns, events depicted
2017	Spain	The Maus		Yayo Herrero	Drama, Fantasy, Horror.

=== Serbia in the Yugoslav Wars films ===
Year	Country	Main title (Alternative titles)	Original title (Original script)	Director	Battles, campaigns, events depicted
1993	FR Yugoslavia	Full Moon Over Belgrade	Пун месец над Београдом; Pun mesec nad Beogradom	Dragan Kresoja	Comedy, Drama, Horror. Belgrade during Yugoslav Wars
1995	FR Yugoslavia; Bulgaria; France	The Tragic Burlesque	Урнебесна трагедија Urnebesna tragedija	Goran Marković	Comedy, Drama, Fantasy
2003	Serbia and Montenegro	Poor Little Hampsters	Сироти мали хрчки 2010; Siroti mali hrčki 2010	Slobodan Šijan	Comedy, Fantasy.
2009	Serbia	The Life and Death of a Porno Gang	Живот и смрт порно банде Život i smrt porno bande	Mladen Đorđević	Adventure, Drama, Horror, Thriller.
2012	Serbia	The Whirl	Вир; Vir	Bojan Vuk Kosovčević	Drama, Fantasy, Mystery.
2021	Serbia; Germany; North Macedonia; Slovenia; Croatia; Montenegro; Bosnia and Herzegovina	Heavens Above	Небеса; Nebesa	Srđan Dragojević	Comedy, Drama, Fantasy.

=== Kosovo in the Yugoslav Wars films ===
Year	Country	Main title (Alternative titles)	Original title (Original script)	Director	Battles, campaigns, events depicted
2010	France	Caged	Captifs	Yann Gozlan	Horror, Thriller.
2022	Serbia; Denmark; Bulgaria; Greece; Italy	Darkling	Мрак; Mrak	Dušan Milić	Drama, Horror. 2004 unrest in Kosovo

=== Uncategorized war films ===
Year	Country	Main title (Alternative titles)	Original title (Original script)	Director	Battles, campaigns, events depicted
2003	United States; Canada; Czech Republic	Bound Cargo		Lloyd A. Simandl	Action, Drama, Horror, Thriller.
2015	United States	Wear		Felix Else	Drama, Fantasy.

== Television films ==
=== Ten-Day War ===
Year	Country	Main title (Alternative titles)	Original title (Original script)	Director	Battles, campaigns, events depicted
2011	Slovenia	1991: The Unshot Bullet	1991 - Neizstreljeni naboj	Jure Pervanje	War.

=== Bosnian War ===
Year	Country	Main title (Alternative titles)	Original title (Original script)	Director	Battles, campaigns, events depicted
1998	Canada; United States; United Kingdom; Hungary	Shot Through the Heart		David Attwood	Drama. Siege of Sarajevo
2008	France; Poland; Italy	Resolution 819	Résolution 819	Giacomo Battiato	United Nations Security Council Resolution 819, Srebrenica massacre

=== Uncategorized war films ===
Year	Country	Main title (Alternative titles)	Original title (Original script)	Director	Battles, campaigns, events depicted
2002	United States; Hungary	Sniper 2		Craig R. Baxley	
2005	Canada; Germany	Hunt for Justice	Jagd nach Gerechtigkeit	Charles Binamé	Drama. International Criminal Tribunal for the former Yugoslavia
2006	United States	Avenger		Robert Markowitz	Thriller.

=== Croatia in the Yugoslav Wars films ===
Year	Country	Main title (Alternative titles)	Original title (Original script)	Director	Battles, campaigns, events depicted
1995	Croatia	See You	Vidimo se	Ivan Salaj	Drama.
1996	Croatia	Recognition	Prepoznavanje	Snježana Tribuson	Thriller. A woman was raped during the war
1997	Croatia	Each Time We Part Away	Svaki put kad se rastajemo	Lukas Nola	Drama.
1997	Canada; United States	Peacekeepers		Brad Turner	Drama, War.

=== Bosnia in the Yugoslav Wars films ===
Year	Country	Main title (Alternative titles)	Original title (Original script)	Director	Battles, campaigns, events depicted
1998	Denmark	The Major	Majoren	Ole Roos	Drama.
2001	Poland; Bosnia and Herzegovina	List		Denijal Hasanović	Drama.

=== Serbia in the Yugoslav Wars films ===
Year	Country	Main title (Alternative titles)	Original title (Original script)	Director	Battles, campaigns, events depicted
1993	FR Yugoslavia	Suza and her sisters	Суза и њене сестре Suza i njene sestre	Zoran Čalić	Drama. Love between a soldier and a nurse in a hospital
1994	FR Yugoslavia	A wish called a tram	Жеља звана трамвај Želja zvana tramvaj	Tanja Fero	Comedy.
1996	FR Yugoslavia	Duel for three	Двобој за троје Dvoboj za troje	Predrag Velinović	Drama.
2000	FR Yugoslavia	And Now Goodbye	А сад адио A sad adio	Aleksandar Đorđević	Comedy.
2007	Serbia	Jar Full of Air	Тегла пуна ваздуха Tegla puna vazduha	Janko Baljak	Drama.
2012	Serbia	Menagerie	Зверињак; Zverinjak	Marko Novaković	Crime, Drama, Romance, Thriller, War.
2013	Serbia	Winch	Чекрк; Čekrk	Petar Stanojlović	Drama. NATO bombing of Yugoslavia

=== North Macedonia in the Yugoslav Wars films ===
Year	Country	Main title (Alternative titles)	Original title (Original script)	Director	Battles, campaigns, events depicted
1995	North Macedonia	The Forgotten Ones	Заборавени	Mladen Krstevski	Drama.
2003	North Macedonia	The Last "Faltz"	Последниот фалцер	Mladen Krstevski	Drama.
2006	North Macedonia	The Steep-headed	Стрмоглави	Maja Mladenovska	Drama.

=== Refugees, Migrants ===
Year	Country	Main title (Alternative titles)	Original title (Original script)	Director	Battles, campaigns, events depicted
1997	United Kingdom	Mirad		Jeremy Irons	Drama.

== Television series ==
=== Croatian War of Independence ===
Year	Country	Main title (Alternative titles)	Original title (Original script)	Director	Battles, campaigns, events depicted
2019-20	Croatia	General		Antun Vrdoljak	Biography, Drama, History. Ante Gotovina
2020-22	Croatia	Missing	Nestali	Kristijan Milić	Action, Drama, War.

=== Bosnian War ===
Year	Country	Main title (Alternative titles)	Original title (Original script)	Director	Battles, campaigns, events depicted
1998	Pakistan	Alpha Bravo Charlie	الفا براوو چارلی	Shoaib Mansoor	Action.
1999	Canada		Opération Tango	Mark Blandford	
1999	United Kingdom	Warriors		Peter Kosminsky	Drama. United Nations Protection Force, Lašva Valley ethnic cleansing.
2003	United Kingdom	Prime Suspect: The Last Witness		Tom Hooper	Crime, Drama, Thriller.
2009	Canada	ZOS: Zone of Separation		Mario Azzopardi	Drama. United Nations Protection Force
2018	Turkey	Alija		Ahmed Imamovic; Ömer Gökhan Erkut	Biography, Drama. Alija Izetbegović
2018	Bosnia and Herzegovina; Serbia	On the Milky Road	На млечном путу Na mlečnom putu	Emir Kusturica	Comedy, Drama, Fantasy, Romance, War.
2023	Serbia	Storm	Олуја; Oluja	Miloš Radunović	Drama, War. Operation Storm

=== Kosovo War ===
Year	Country	Main title (Alternative titles)	Original title (Original script)	Director	Battles, campaigns, events depicted
2014	Russia	Godfather	Крёстный	Timur Alpatov	Drama.
2019	Russia	Batalon	Батальон	Aleksey Bystritskiy	Action, Drama, History.
2020	Serbia	The Balkan Line	Balkanska medja Балканска медја	Andrey Volgin	

=== Croatia in the Yugoslav Wars ===
Year	Country	Main title (Alternative titles)	Original title (Original script)	Director	Battles, campaigns, events depicted
2008	Croatia	Sad rich man	Tužni bogataš	Davor Žmegač	Drama.
2013	Croatia	Dawn of Dubrovnik	Zora dubrovačka		Drama, Romance, War.
2025	Serbia	Fortress	Тврђава; Tvrđava	Saša Hajduković	Drama.

=== Bosnia in the Yugoslav Wars ===
Year	Country	Main title (Alternative titles)	Original title (Original script)	Director	Battles, campaigns, events depicted
1994	FR Yugoslavia; Bosnia and Herzegovina	Bare life	Голи живот Goli život	Slavko Milanović	Comedy, Drama, War.
1995	FR Yugoslavia	United Brothers	Сложна браћа Složna braća	Oleg Novković; Nikola Pejaković; Nele Karajlić	Comedy.
2002-8	Bosnia and Herzegovina	Visa for the Future	Viza za budućnost		Comedy, Drama, Family.
2004	United Kingdom; Canada	Sex Traffic		David Yates	Crime, Drama.
2004	Bosnia and Herzegovina	Black Chronicle	Crna hronika	Faruk Sokolović; Danijela Gogić; Nedžad Begović; Namik Kabil	Action, Crime, Drama.
2006	New Zealand	Doves of War		Chris Bailey	Drama, Thriller.
2006	Serbia and Montenegro	Life Is a Miracle	Живот је чудо Život je čudo	Emir Kusturica	Comedy, Drama, Romance, War.
2011	Serbia; Bosnia and Herzegovina; Croatia; Slovenia	The Tour	Турнеја; Turneja	Goran Marković	Adventure, Comedy. Theatrical troupe during the war
2011-13	Turkey	Mavi Kelebekler		Metin Balekoğlu	Drama.
2017	Bosnia and Herzegovina; Serbia	Meat	Месо; Meso	Saša Hajduković	Crime, Drama, Thriller.
2020	Bosnia and Herzegovina; Serbia	Bones	Кости; Kosti	Saša Hajduković	Crime, Drama, Thriller.

=== Serbia in the Yugoslav Wars ===
Year	Country	Main title (Alternative titles)	Original title (Original script)	Director	Battles, campaigns, events depicted
1993-96	FR Yugoslavia	Happy People	Срећни људи Srećni ljudi	Aleksandar Đorđević; Slobodan Šuljagić	Belgrade during Yugoslav Wars
1994-2014	FR Yugoslavia; Serbia	Open Doors	Отворена врата Otvorena vrata		Comedy.
1996-97	FR Yugoslavia	Up and down	Горе-доле; Gore-dole	Miloš Radivojević; Miroslav Lekić	Comedy, Drama.
1998-2002	FR Yugoslavia	The Family Treasure	Породично благо Porodično blago	Aleksandar Đorđević; Mihailo Vukobratović	Comedy, Drama, Family.
2002	FR Yugoslavia	Frozen Stiff	Мртав ’ладан Mrtav ’ladan	Milorad Milinković	Comedy.
2002-3	FR Yugoslavia	Penal space	Казнени простор Kazneni prostor	Milorad Milinković; Marko Sopić; Bane Vučić	Comedy. Belgrade after Yugoslav Wars
2015	United Kingdom; France	The Last Panthers		Johan Renck	Action, Crime, Drama.
2021	Serbia	The family	Породица; Porodica	Bojan Vuletić	Drama, History. Slobodan Milošević
2024	Bosnia and Herzegovina; Serbia	Skin	Кожа; Koža	Saša Hajduković	Crime, Drama, Thriller.
2024	Serbia	Operation Sabre	Сабља; Sablja	Goran Stanković; Vladimir Tagić	Crime, Drama, Thriller. Assassination of Zoran Đinđić
2025	Serbia	Absolute 100	Апсолутних сто Apsolutnih sto	Srdan Golubović; Stefan Ivančić; Katarina Mutić; Nikola Stojanović	Crime, Drama, Sport, Thriller.

=== Montenegro in the Yugoslav Wars ===
Year	Country	Main title (Alternative titles)	Original title (Original script)	Director	Battles, campaigns, events depicted
1992-93	FR Yugoslavia	I love oranges too... but I suffer	Волим и ја неранџе... но трпим Volim i ja nerandže... no trpim	Zdravko Šotra; Slobodan Šuljagić	Comedy.

=== Kosovo in the Yugoslav Wars ===
Year	Country	Main title (Alternative titles)	Original title (Original script)	Director	Battles, campaigns, events depicted
2023	Serbia	Darkling	Мрак; Mrak	Dušan Milić	Drama. 2004 unrest in Kosovo
