= Big Golden Arena for Best Film =

- Country: Yugoslavia (1957–1990); Croatia (1992–present)
- Presented by: Pula Film Festival Jury
- First award: 1957 (unofficially); 1961 (officially)
- Currently held by: Peacemaker
- Website: pulafilmfestival.hr

The Golden Arena awards were established in 1955 as the Yugoslav national film awards presented annually at the Pula Film Festival in Pula, Croatia, with the Big Golden Arena for Best Film its main prize. From 1955 to 1990 the awards were the Yugoslav cinema equivalent of the Academy Awards.

The award is named after the Pula Arena, the 1st-century Roman amphitheatre in the coastal city of Pula, where film screenings preceding the awards ceremony traditionally take place.

In 1991 the festival was cancelled due to the breakup of Yugoslavia, but then resumed in 1992 as the Croatian film awards festival, from then on excluding films and filmmakers from present-day Slovenia, Bosnia and Herzegovina, Montenegro, Serbia, and North Macedonia.^{[A]} It has been held in this format every year since, although no prizes were awarded at the 1994 edition.^{[B]}

The festival's competition program usually includes screenings of all locally produced feature films made in the preceding 12 months, made possible due to the local film industry's relatively low but highly state subsidized output. This means that everyone involved in making them automatically qualifies for the Golden Arena awards. Therefore there are no Academy Award-style lists of nominees announced prior to the actual awarding ceremony.

The awards are handed out by a jury of five or six members which is named before each festival edition by the festival's managing board. These usually include prominent filmmakers and film critics.

Although the festival was established in 1954, the award for best film was first awarded in 1957 - prior to the 1957 edition, the festival had separate critics' choice and audience awards for best film screened at the festival. Until 1990, the award was always given to the film's production company or companies, except in 1981 when the award was merged with the Golden Arena for Best Director and both the director and production companies of the winning film (The Fall of Italy by Lordan Zafranović) were credited with the award.

During the Yugoslav period, film production was decentralised with each of the six republics having their own major film production companies. Jadran Film based in Zagreb and Avala Film based in Belgrade were the two most successful, winning 11 and 8 awards respectively.

In the 1990s the award was intermittently merged with the Best Director award, until 1999 when the old format was briefly re-introduced. Between 2003 and 2007 film directors were credited with the Best Film award, while still being eligible for the separate Best Director award (although on four out of five occasions in this period the same director won both awards for the same film). Since 2008 the award is given to the film's producer.

== List of winners ==
=== 1955–1980 ===
The following table lists all films which were winners of the top three prizes in the period from 1957 to 1980. On four occasions two films shared the same prize - in 1961 and 1965 two films shared the Big Golden Arena, in 1966 two films shared the runner-up award and in 1967 two films shared the third-place award. In addition to this, the 1965 second place prize was not awarded. Shared awards are indicated with an asterisk (*).

Award changes

- In 1954 there was no festival jury and separate Critics' Choice and Audience awards were given. The Critics' Choice Award for Best Film went to František Čap's film Vesna, and the Audience Award for Best Film went to Fedor Hanžeković's film Stojan Mutikaša. In the following years both the critics' and audiences' awards were kept in parallel with the festival jury-given Golden Arenas, so the 1954 awards are usually not considered precursors of the present-day Big Golden Arena.
- In 1955 a festival jury was introduced for the first time and it was also the first time that the award was officially called Big Golden Arena. Although it was given to the best film's director, it is de facto the first Big Golden Arena for Best Film, and it was won by František Čap for the film Trenutki odločitve.
- In 1956 the Best Film award was not given in any form.
- From 1957 to 1960 the festival jury ranked three best films of the festival, without giving them an official award.
- From 1961 to 1968 the Big Golden Arena was awarded to best film, along with the second place prize called Big Silver Arena and a third place prize called Silver Arena.
- From 1969 to 1980 the third place prize was renamed Big Bronze Arena.

Year	Award	English title(s)	Original title(s)	Director(s)
1955	1st place, gold medalist(s)	Moments of Decision	Trenutki odločitve	František Čap
1956	Big Golden Arena was not awarded.			
1957	1st place, gold medalist(s)	Priests Ćira and Spira	Pop Ćira i pop Spira	Soja Jovanović
1957	2nd place, silver medalist(s)	Master of His Own Body	Svoga tela gospodar	Fedor Hanžeković
1957	3rd place, bronze medalist(s)	Saturday Night	Subotom uveče	Vladimir Pogačić
1958	1st place, gold medalist(s)	H-8	H-8	Nikola Tanhofer
1958	2nd place, silver medalist(s)	The Road a Year Long	Cesta duga godinu dana	Giuseppe De Santis
1958	3rd place, bronze medalist(s)	The Sky Through the Trees	Kroz granje nebo	Stole Janković
1959	1st place, gold medalist(s)	Train Without a Timetable	Vlak bez voznog reda	Veljko Bulajić
1959	2nd place, silver medalist(s)	Three Quarters of a Sun	Tri četrtine sonca	Jože Babič
1959	3rd place, bronze medalist(s)	Five Minutes of Paradise	Pet minuta raja	Igor Pretnar
1960	1st place, gold medalist(s)	The Ninth Circle	Deveti krug	France Štiglic
1960	2nd place, silver medalist(s)	Atomic War Bride	Rat	Veljko Bulajić
1960	3rd place, bronze medalist(s)	Three Girls Named Anna	Tri Ane	Branko Bauer
1961	1st place, gold medalist(s)	Ballad About a Trumpet and a Cloud *	Balada o trobenti in oblaku	France Štiglic
1961	1st place, gold medalist(s)	The First Fires *	Uzavreli grad	Veljko Bulajić
1961	2nd place, silver medalist(s)	The Party	Veselica	Jože Babič
1961	3rd place, bronze medalist(s)		Pesma	Radoš Novaković
1962	1st place, gold medalist(s)	Kozara	Kozara	Veljko Bulajić
1962	2nd place, silver medalist(s)		Saša	Radenko Ostojić
1962	3rd place, bronze medalist(s)		Prekobrojna	Branko Bauer
1963	1st place, gold medalist(s)	Face to Face	Licem u lice	Branko Bauer
1963	2nd place, silver medalist(s)		Radopolje	Stole Janković
1963	3rd place, bronze medalist(s)	Wild Growth	Samorastniki	Igor Pretnar
1964	1st place, gold medalist(s)	Official Position	Službeni položaj	Fadil Hadžić
1964	2nd place, silver medalist(s)		Marš na Drinu	Žika Mitrović
1964	3rd place, bronze medalist(s)	Don't Cry, Peter	Ne joči, Peter	France Štiglic
1965	1st place, gold medalist(s)	Prometheus of the Island *	Prometej s otoka Viševice	Vatroslav Mimica
1965	1st place, gold medalist(s)	Three *	Tri	Aleksandar Petrović
1965	2nd place, silver medalist(s)	Second place prize was not awarded.		
1965	3rd place, bronze medalist(s)		Doći i ostati	Branko Bauer
1966	1st place, gold medalist(s)	Monday or Tuesday	Ponedjeljak ili utorak	Vatroslav Mimica
1966	2nd place, silver medalist(s)	The Climber*	Štićenik	Vladan Slijepčević
1966	2nd place, silver medalist(s)	Rondo *	Rondo	Zvonimir Berković
1966	3rd place, bronze medalist(s)	The Dream	San	Puriša Đorđević
1967	1st place, gold medalist(s)	I Even Met Happy Gypsies	Skupljači perja	Aleksandar Petrović
1967	2nd place, silver medalist(s)	The Morning	Jutro	Puriša Đorđević
1967	3rd place, bronze medalist(s)	The Birch Tree *	Breza	Ante Babaja
1967	3rd place, bronze medalist(s)	On Paper Planes *	Na avionima od papira	Matjaž Klopčič
1968	1st place, gold medalist(s)	When I Am Pale and Dead	Kad budem mrtav i beo	Živojin Pavlović
1968	2nd place, silver medalist(s)	Noon	Podne	Puriša Đorđević
1968	3rd place, bronze medalist(s)	I Have Two Mothers and Two Fathers	Imam dvije mame i dva tate	Krešimir Golik
1969	1st place, gold medalist(s)	Downstream from the Sun	Nizvodno od sunca	Fedor Škubonja
1969	2nd place, silver medalist(s)	An Event	Događaj	Vatroslav Mimica
1969	3rd place, bronze medalist(s)	It Rains in My Village	Biće skoro propast sveta	Aleksandar Petrović
1970	1st place, gold medalist(s)	Handcuffs	Lisice	Krsto Papić
1970	2nd place, silver medalist(s)	The Cyclists	Biciklisti	Puriša Đorđević
1970	3rd place, bronze medalist(s)	This Crazy World of Ours	Bube u glavi	Miloš Radivojević
1971	1st place, gold medalist(s)	Red Wheat	Rdeče klasje / Crveno klasje	Živojin Pavlović
1971	2nd place, silver medalist(s)	The Pine Tree in the Mountain	U gori raste zelen bor	Antun Vrdoljak
1971	3rd place, bronze medalist(s)	The Bet	Opklada	Zdravko Randić
1972	1st place, gold medalist(s)	The Master and Margaret	Maestro i Margarita	Aleksandar Petrović
1972	2nd place, silver medalist(s)	Lone Wolf	Vuk samotnjak	Obrad Gluščević
1972	3rd place, bronze medalist(s)	How to Die	Kako umrijeti	Miomir Stamenković
1973	1st place, gold medalist(s)	The Battle of Sutjeska	Sutjeska	Stipe Delić
1973	2nd place, silver medalist(s)	The Bombardiers	Bombaši	Predrag Golubović
1973	3rd place, bronze medalist(s)	To Live on Love	Živjeti od ljubavi	Krešimir Golik
1974	1st place, gold medalist(s)	The Republic of Užice	Užička republika	Žika Mitrović
1974	2nd place, silver medalist(s)	The Dervish and Death	Derviš i smrt	Zdravko Velimirović
1974	3rd place, bronze medalist(s)		Crveni udar	Predrag Golubović
1975	1st place, gold medalist(s)	The House	Kuća	Bogdan Žižić
1975	2nd place, silver medalist(s)	Wintering in Jakobsfeld	Zimovanje u Jakobsfeldu	Branko Bauer
1975	3rd place, bronze medalist(s)	Story of Good People	Povest o dobrih ljudeh	France Štiglic
1976	1st place, gold medalist(s)	Idealist	Idealist	Igor Pretnar
1976	2nd place, silver medalist(s)	The Longest Journey	Najdolgiot pat	Branko Gapo
1976	3rd place, bronze medalist(s)	Anno Domini 1573	Seljačka buna 1573	Vatroslav Mimica
1977	1st place, gold medalist(s)	Don't Lean Out the Window	Ne naginji se van	Bogdan Žižić
1977	2nd place, silver medalist(s)	Operation Stadium	Akcija stadion	Dušan Vukotić
1977	3rd place, bronze medalist(s)	Beloved Love	Ljubavni život Budimira Trajkovića	Dejan Karaklajić
1978	1st place, gold medalist(s)	Occupation in 26 Pictures	Okupacija u 26 slika	Lordan Zafranović
1978	2nd place, silver medalist(s)	Bravo Maestro	Bravo maestro	Rajko Grlić
1978	3rd place, bronze medalist(s)	The Dog Who Loved Trains	Pas koji je voleo vozove	Goran Paskaljević
1979	1st place, gold medalist(s)	Trophy	Trofej	Karolj Viček
1979	2nd place, silver medalist(s)	Burning	Usijanje	Boro Drašković
1979	3rd place, bronze medalist(s)	The Days on Earth Are Flowing	Zemaljski dani teku	Goran Paskaljević
1980	1st place, gold medalist(s)	Petria's Wreath	Petrijin venac	Srđan Karanović
1980	2nd place, silver medalist(s)	The Secret of Nikola Tesla	Tajna Nikole Tesle	Krsto Papić
1980	3rd place, bronze medalist(s)	Who's That Singing Over There	Ko to tamo peva	Slobodan Šijan

=== 1981–1991 ===
In 1981 the second and third place prizes were dropped. The following table lists all winners from 1981 to 1990. The Big Golden Arena was not awarded in 1982.

Year	International title	Original title	Director (Wins)
1981 (28th)	The Fall of Italy	Pad Italije	Lordan Zafranović (2)
1982 (29th)	Main prize not awarded.		
1983 (30th)	Body Scent	Zadah tela	Živojin Pavlović (3)
1984 (31st)	Balkan Spy	Balkanski špijun	Božidar Nikolić & Dušan Kovačević
1985 (32nd)	When Father Was Away on Business	Otac na službenom putu	Emir Kusturica
1986 (33rd)	Happy New Year '49	Srećna nova '49.	Stole Popov
1987 (34th)	Reflections	Već viđeno	Goran Marković
1988 (35th)	My Uncle's Legacy	Život sa stricem	Krsto Papić (2)
1989 (36th)	The Meeting Point	Sabirni centar	Goran Marković (2)
1990 (37th)	Silent Gunpowder	Gluvi barut	Bato Čengić
1991 (38th)	Festival cancelled.^{[A]}		

=== 1992–present ===
Amid the breakup of Yugoslavia and the escalation of violence in 1991 during the early stages of the Croatian War of Independence, the festival was abruptly cancelled immediately after the scheduled opening in late July of that year. This was the last edition titled "Festival of Yugoslav Film."

In 1992 the event was renamed and relaunched as the "Pula Film Festival." Award categories were left unchanged, but the selection criteria narrowed to Croatian-produced films only, excluding films made by studios from the other five republics of Yugoslavia.

This meant that only a handful of films were eligible for awards, and the overall lack of domestic film activity during the ensuing 1991–95 war even led to the cancellation of the 1994 award ceremony, as only one Croatian feature film had been produced in the preceding 12 months.

Year	International title	Original title	Director (Wins)
1992 (39th)	Story from Croatia	Priča iz Hrvatske	Krsto Papić (3)
1993 (40th)	Countess Dora	Kontesa Dora	Zvonimir Berković
1994 (41st)	National awards program cancelled.^{[B]}		
1995 (42nd)	Washed Out	Isprani	Zrinko Ogresta
1996 (43rd)	How the War Started on My Island	Kako je počeo rat na mom otoku	Vinko Brešan
1997 (44th)	Mondo Bobo	Mondo Bobo	Goran Rušinović
1998 (45th)	When the Dead Start Singing	Kad mrtvi zapjevaju	Krsto Papić (4)
1999 (46th)	Madonna	Bogorodica	Neven Hitrec
2000 (47th)	Marshal Tito's Spirit	Maršal	Vinko Brešan (2)
2001 (48th)	Slow Surrender	Polagana predaja	Bruno Gamulin
2002 (49th)	Fine Dead Girls	Fine mrtve djevojke	Dalibor Matanić
2003 (50th)	Here	Tu	Zrinko Ogresta (2)
2004 (51st)	Long Dark Night	Duga mračna noć	Antun Vrdoljak
2005 (52nd)	What Iva Recorded	Što je Iva snimila 21. listopada 2003.	Tomislav Radić
2006 (53rd)	All for Free	Sve džaba	Antonio Nuić
2007 (54th)	The Living and the Dead	Živi i mrtvi	Kristijan Milić
2008 (55th)	No One's Son	Ničiji sin	Arsen Anton Ostojić
2009 (56th)	Metastases	Metastaze	Branko Schmidt
2010 (57th)	Just Between Us	Neka ostane među nama	Rajko Grlić
2011 (58th)	Kotlovina	Kotlovina	Tomislav Radić (2)
2012 (59th)	A Letter to My Father	Pismo ćaći	Damir Čučić
2013 (60th)	A Stranger	Obrana i zaštita	Bobo Jelčić
2014 (61st)	Number 55	Broj 55	Kristijan Milić (2)
2015 (62nd)	The High Sun	Zvizdan	Dalibor Matanić (2)
2016 (63rd)	On the Other Side	S one strane	Zrinko Ogresta (3)
2017 (64th)	A Brief Excursion	Kratki izlet	Igor Bezinović
2018 (65th)	Mali	Mali	Antonio Nuić (2)
2019 (66th)	The Diary of Diana B	Dnevnik Diane Budisavljević	Dana Budisavljević
2020 (67th)	Tereza37	Tereza37	Danilo Šerbedžija
2021 (68th)	A Blue Flower	Plavi cvijet	Zrinko Ogresta (4)
2022 (69th)	The Staffroom	Zbornica	Sonja Tarokić
2023 (70th)	Bigger than Trauma	Veće od traume	Vedrana Pribačić
2024 (71st)	Celebration	Proslava	Bruno Anković
2025 (72nd)	Peacemaker	Mirotvorac	Ivan Ramljak
2026 (73rd)	Honey Bunny	Koke	Igor Jelinović

== Footnotes ==
A. Although the festival opened on schedule on 26 July 1991 and a press screening of Zrinko Ogresta's film Fragments: Chronicle of a Vanishing was held, the festival board presided by Antun Vrdoljak decided to cancel the entire event in protest against the armed conflict in Slovenia and the escalating hostilities in Croatia. Nine Yugoslav-produced films were supposed to be screened in the national competition program.

B.: In 1994 the national competition program and the awards ceremony were cancelled as only one Croatian feature film had been made over the preceding 12 months (The Price of Life, directed by Bogdan Žižić). The festival was held in spite of this, and the usual screenings were replaced by a retrospective of films produced by the celebrated Zagreb School of Animated Film and a selection of documentaries, while the main program was replaced by premieres of six American mainstream releases.
