= Golden Arena for Best Director =

- Awarded for: "Outstanding achievement in cinematic direction"
- Country: Yugoslavia (1955–1991); Croatia (1992–present)
- Presented by: Pula Film Festival Jury
- First award: 1955
- Currently held by: Zrinko Ogresta (2021)
- Website: Official Website

The Golden Arena for Best Director (Croatian: Zlatna arena za režiju) is an award given for best director at the Pula Film Festival, which was until 1992 the Yugoslav equivalent of the Academy Awards. Since 1992 and the breakup of Yugoslavia the competition narrowed to Croatian films only. The first festival was held in 1954, but the award was introduced in 1955.

== List of winners ==
=== Yugoslav competition (1955–90) ===
Year	Director	International title	Original title	Ref.
1954 (1st)	No jury prizes awarded in 1954.			
1955 (2nd)	František Čáp	Moments of Decision	Trenutki odločitve	
1956 (3rd)	Branko Bauer	Don't Look Back, My Son	Ne okreći se sine	
1957 (4th)	Soja Jovanović	Priests Ćira and Spira	Pop Ćira i pop Spira	
1958 (5th)	Nikola Tanhofer	H-8	H-8	
1959 (6th)	Jože Babič	Three Quarters of a Sun	Tri četrtine sonca	
1960 (7th)	Veljko Bulajić	Atomic War Bride	Rat	
1961 (8th)	Golden Arena for Best Director not awarded in 1961 and 1962.			
1962 (9th)	Golden Arena for Best Director not awarded in 1961 and 1962.			
1963 (10th)	Branko Bauer (shared) (2)	Face to Face	Licem u lice	
1963 (10th)	Igor Pretnar (shared)	Wild Growth	Samorastniki	
1964 (11th)	Žika Mitrović (shared)	March on the Drina	Marš na Drinu	
1964 (11th)	France Štiglic (shared)	Don't Cry, Peter	Ne joči, Peter	
1965 (12th)	Aleksandar Petrović	Three	Tri	
1966 (13th)	Vatroslav Mimica	Monday or Tuesday	Ponedjeljak ili utorak	
1967 (14th)	Puriša Đorđević (shared)	The Morning	Jutro	
1967 (14th)	Aleksandar Petrović (shared) (2)	I Even Met Happy Gypsies	Skupljači perja	
1968 (15th)	Živojin Pavlović	When I Am Dead and Gone	Kad budem mrtav i beo	
1969 (16th)	Fedor Škubonja	Downstream from the Sun	Nizvodno od sunca	
1970 (17th)	Krsto Papić	Handcuffs	Lisice	
1971 (18th)	Kiril Cenevski	Black Seed	Crno seme	
1972 (19th)	Aleksandar Petrović (3)	The Master and Margaret	Maestro i Margarita	
1973 (20th)	Matjaž Klopčič	Blossoms in Autumn	Cvetje v jesen	
1974 (21st)	Zdravko Velimirović	Death and the Dervish	Derviš i smrt	
1975 (22nd)	Matjaž Klopčič (2)	Fear	Strah	
1976 (23rd)	Goran Paskaljević	Beach Guard in Winter	Čuvar plaže u zimskom periodu	
1977 (24th)	Živojin Pavlović (2)	Manhunt	Hajka	
1978 (25th)	Srđan Karanović	Fragrance of Wild Flowers	Miris poljskog cveća	
1979 (26th)	Fadil Hadžić	Journalist	Novinar	
1980 (27th)	Goran Paskaljević (2)	Special Treatment	Poseban tretman	
1981 (28th)	Golden Arena for Best Director not awarded in 1981.			
1982 (29th)	Miloš Radivojević	Living Like the Rest of Us	Živeti kao sav normalan svet	
1983 (30th)	Srđan Karanović (2)	Something in Between	Nešto između	
1984 (31st)	Rajko Grlić	In the Jaws of Life	U raljama života	
1985 (32nd)	Emir Kusturica	When Father Was Away on Business	Otac na službenom putu	
1986 (33rd)	Lordan Zafranović	Evening Bells	Večernja zvona	
1987 (34th)	Vladimir Blaževski	Hi-Fi	Haj-faj	
1988 (35th)	Žarko Dragojević	The House by the Railway Tracks	Kuće pored pruge	
1989 (36th)	Jože Pogačnik	Cafe Astoria	Kavana Astoria	
1990 (37th)	Filip Robar Dorin	The Windhunter	Veter v mreži	

=== Croatian competition (1992–present) ===
Year	Director	International title	Original title	Ref.
1991 (38th)	Festival cancelled.			
1992 (39th)	Krsto Papić (2)	Story from Croatia	Priča iz Hrvatske	
1993 (40th)	Davor Žmegač	The Golden Years	Zlatne godine	
1994 (41st)	National film programme cancelled, no prizes awarded.			
1995 (42nd)	Zrinko Ogresta	Washed Out	Isprani	
1996 (43rd)	Vinko Brešan	How the War Started on My Island	Kako je počeo rat na mom otoku	
1997 (44th)	Goran Rušinović	Mondo Bobo	Mondo Bobo	
1998 (45th)	Krsto Papić (3)	When the Dead Start Singing	Kad mrtvi zapjevaju	
1999 (46th)	Zrinko Ogresta (2)	Red Dust	Crvena prašina	
2000 (47th)	Lukas Nola	Celestial Body	Nebo, sateliti	
2001 (48th)	Bruno Gamulin	Slow Surrender	Polagana predaja	
2002 (49th)	Dalibor Matanić	Fine Dead Girls	Fine mrtve djevojke	
2003 (50th)	Vinko Brešan (2)	Witnesses	Svjedoci	
2004 (51st)	Antun Vrdoljak	Long Dark Night	Duga mračna noć	
2005 (52nd)	Tomislav Radić	What Iva Recorded	Što je Iva snimila 21. listopada 2003.	
2006 (53rd)	Antonio Nuić	All for Free	Sve džaba	
2007 (54th)	Kristijan Milić	The Living and the Dead	Živi i mrtvi	
2008 (55th)	Arsen Anton Ostojić	No One's Son	Ničiji sin	
2009 (56th)	Goran Dević (co-director)	The Blacks	Crnci	
2009 (56th)	Zvonimir Jurić (co-director)	The Blacks	Crnci	
2010 (57th)	Rajko Grlić (2)	Just Between Us	Neka ostane među nama	
2011 (58th)	Dalibor Matanić (2)	Daddy	Ćaća	
2012 (59th)	Branko Schmidt	Vegetarian Cannibal	Ljudožder vegetarijanac	
2013 (60th)	Bobo Jelčić	A Stranger	Obrana i zaštita	
2014 (61st)	Kristijan Milić (2)	Number 55	Broj 55	
2015 (62nd)	Dalibor Matanić (3)	The High Sun	Zvizdan	
2016 (63rd)	Zrinko Ogresta (3)	On the Other Side	S one strane	
2017 (64th)	Hana Jušić	Quit Staring at My Plate	Ne gledaj mi u pijat	
2018 (65th)	Nevio Marasović	Comic Sans	Comic Sans	
2019 (66th)	Dana Budisavljević	The Diary of Diana B	Dnevnik Diane Budisavljević	
2020 (67th)	Danilo Šerbedžija	Tereza37	Tereza37	
2021 (68th)	Zrinko Ogresta (4)	A Blue Flower	Plavi cvijet	
2022 (69th)	Sonja Tarokić	The Staffroom	Zbornica	
2023 (70th)	Juraj Lerotić	Safe Place	Sigurno mjesto	
2024 (71st)	Silvestar Kolbas	Our Children	Naša djeca	
2025 (72nd)	Igor Bezinović	Fiume o morte!	Fiume o morte!	
2026 (73rd)	Srđan Kovačević	The Thing to Be Done	Ono što treba činiti	

== Multiple winners ==
The following directors have received multiple awards. The list is sorted by the number of total awards. Years in bold indicate wins in Yugoslav competition (1955–1990). Shared wins are indicated with an asterisk (*).

- 4 : Zrinko Ogresta (1995, 1999, 2016, 2021)
- 3 : Aleksandar Petrović (**1965**, **1967***, **1972**)
- 3 : Krsto Papić (**1970**, 1992, 1998)
- 3 : Dalibor Matanić (2002, 2011, 2015)
- 2 : Branko Bauer (**1956***, **1963**)
- 2 : Matjaž Klopčič (**1973**, **1975**)
- 2 : Živojin Pavlović (**1968**, **1977**)
- 2 : Goran Paskaljević (**1976**, **1980**)
- 2 : Srđan Karanović (**1978**, **1983**)
- 2 : Vinko Brešan (1996, 2003)
- 2 : Rajko Grlić (**1984**, 2010)
- 2 : Kristijan Milić (2007, 2014)
