= Mate Matišić =

Croatian playwright, screenwriter and composer (born 1965)

- Born: 17 January 1965 (age 60); Ričice, Proložac, SFR Yugoslavia
- Education: B.A. in Law
- Alma mater: University of Zagreb
- Occupation: Radio editor
- Years active: 1985–present
- Known for: Plays, screenplays, film and theater music
- Awards: Golden Arena for Best Film Music (2000, 2003, 2008); Golden Arena for Best Screenplay (2016, 2019)

Mate Matišić (born 17 January 1965) is a Croatian playwright, screenwriter, composer and musician. His plays have been staged in Croatian theaters as well as internationally, and some of them have been adapted into feature films. As a composer, he is best known for his film and theatrical music. He has won five Golden Arena awards at the Pula Film Festival.

== Biography ==
Matišić was born in Ričice, near Imotski. At the age of six, he moved to Zagreb, where he finished elementary and high school. Matišić graduated from the Faculty of Law, University of Zagreb, but he never practiced law.

Between 1996 and 1998, Matišić worked as a dramaturge in Jadran Film. Since 1998, he works at the Croatian Radio. He is also a docent at the Academy of Dramatic Art, University of Zagreb, where he is head of the Department of Dramaturgy. He is married and a father of three.

=== Literary work ===
Matišić began to write in his senior year in high school. He wrote his first play, Namigni mu, Bruno!, in 1985; it premiered in the Croatian National Theatre in Split in 1987 as Bljesak zlatnog zuba. Upon seeing the play, film director Krsto Papić asked Matišić to help him with the screenplay for My Uncle's Legacy (1988). This was Matišić's first screenwriting credit, and the beginning of collaboration with Krsto Papić, with whom he worked on three more feature films.

Matišić's plays have been described as "shocking". His most controversial play, Angels of Babel (Anđeli Babilona, 1996), staged in Gavella Drama Theatre, featured a rural politician who had sexual intercourse with a sheep, which some interpreted as an allusion to the President of Croatia or to some other high-ranked Croatian politicians. From comedies that marked his early career, Matišić moved towards dark humor and more somber subjects, with death as one of his major themes. Matišić's plays have been staged in Croatia (Split, Rijeka, Varaždin and Zagreb), Macedonia, Slovenia, Bulgaria, Hungary and Russia.

His more recent theatrical work, Posthumous Trilogy (Posmrtna trilogija, 2006) is a collection of three plays: Sons Die First (Sinovi umiru prvi), No One's Son (Ničiji sin) and The Woman Without a Body (Žena bez tijela). Although these three plays share some common motifs such as fatherhood, belonging and family, and all three end in suicide of the protagonist, Matišić described them respectively as a tragicomedy, a drama, and a dark-humored psychological thriller. No One's Son and The Woman Without a Body have been adapted into feature films, No One's Son and Will Not End Here, both released in 2008.

Matišić received Golden Arena awards for Best Screenplay for the films On the Other Side (shared with Zrinko Ogresta) and What a Country!.

=== Music ===
As of 2013, Matišić composed film music for all five Vinko Brešan's feature films, winning Golden Arena for Best Film Music for two of them: Marshal Tito's Spirit in 2000 and Witnesses in 2003. He won his third Golden Arena for Best Film Music for No One's Son in 2008. Apart from film scores, he composed music for theater and television.

Matišić is a multi-instrumental musician and a member of Hot Club Zagreb, a gypsy jazz band with international experience. His long-standing interest is music of Django Reinhardt, which has been the subject of his research for more than two decades.

== Works ==
Plays:

- Bljesak zlatnog zuba (1985)
- Legenda o svetom Muhli (1988)
- Božićna bajka (1989)
- Cinco i Marinko (1992)
- Anđeli Babilona (1996)
- Svećenikova djeca (1999)
- Sinovi umiru prvi (2005)
- Ničiji sin (2005)
- Žena bez tijela (2005)
- Balon (2009)
- Fine mrtve djevojke (2013)

Feature film screenplays (author or co-author):

- My Uncle's Legacy (1988)
- Story from Croatia (1991)
- When the Dead Start Singing (1998)
- Fine Dead Girls (2002)
- Infection (2003)
- No One's Son (2008)
- Will Not End Here (2008)
- Flower Square (2012)
- The Priest's Children (2013)
- On the Other Side (2016)
- What a Country! (2018)

Feature film scores:

- How the War Started on My Island (1996)
- Marshal Tito's Spirit (2000)
- Go, Yellow (2001)
- Witnesses (2003)
- Infection (2003)
- A Wonderful Night in Split (2004)
- Two Players from the Bench (2005)
- No One's Son (2008)
- Will Not End Here (2008)
- Halima's Path (2012)
- The Priest's Children (2013)
- On the Other Side (2016)
