= Alispahić =

Alispahić is a Bosnian surname, derived from Turkish Ali Sipahi. People with the name include:

- Fatmir Alispahić (born 1966), Bosnian publicist and journalist
- Kemal Alispahić (born 1965), former Bosnian footballer turned manager
- Mehmed Alispahić (born 1987), Bosnian footballer
- Nijaz Alispahić (born 1940), Bosnian writer
- Selma Alispahić (born 1970), Bosnian actress
