= Face to Face (1963 film) =

1963 Croatian film by Branko Bauer

- Directed by: Branko Bauer
- Written by: Bogdan Jovanović
- Starring: Ilija Džuvalekovski; Husein Čokić; Vladimir Popović
- Cinematography: Branko Blažina
- Edited by: Blaženka Jenčik
- Music by: Branimir Sakač
- Production company: Jadran Film
- Release date: 1963
- Running time: 99 minutes
- Country: Yugoslavia
- Language: Serbo-Croatian

Face to Face (Licem u lice) is a 1963 Yugoslavian political film. It is directed by Branko Bauer, written by Bogdan Jovanović, and stars Ilija Džuvalekovski, Husein Čokić, and Vladimir Popović.

== Plot ==
A worker named Milun is falsely charged by officials for writing an anonymous letter critical of the company. Company management subsequently fires Milun. Although other workers fail to come to his aid during the process, they afterwards come together in a demonstration of labor rights to vote to remove the manager.

== Political background and themes ==
At the time of release, the film industry in Yugoslavia was controlled by the government, but individual filmmakers were given some autonomy. Face to Face was an early example of political criticism in Yugoslavian film.

The film highlights conflict between workers fighting for democratization and self-management and the management structures of the socialist party, providing an ultimately optimistic story in support of self-management socialism.

== Reception ==
According to Daniel J. Goulding, Face to Face was "critically and popularly acclaimed". Its entry in the Filmski leksikon of the Miroslav Krleža Institute of Lexicography said it was a "great success [which] has been emphasized as a positive example of society." The Ikon Arts Foundation said it was "the first political film in Yugoslavia."

Face to Face won several Golden Arena awards at the 10th Pula Film Festival, including Best Film, Best Director, and the Jelen audience award.
