= Projections (film) =

- Film poster
- Croatian: Projekcije
- Directed by: Zrinko Ogresta
- Written by: Lada Kaštelan
- Starring: Jasna Bilušić; Polona Juh
- Cinematography: Branko Linta
- Production companies: Croatian Radiotelevision; Inter film
- Release dates: 25 July 2013 (Pula Film Festival); 30 January 2014
- Running time: 80 minutes
- Country: Croatia
- Language: Croatian

Projections (Croatian: Projekcije) is a 2013 Croatian drama film directed by Zrinko Ogresta.

== Cast ==
- Jasna Bilušić as Barbara
- Polona Juh as Natasa
- Vladimir Jurc as Professor Blau
- Ksenija Marinković as Alemka
- Jelena Miholjević as Simona
- Bojan Navojec as Bojan
- Ksenija Pajić as Irena
