= Inge Appelt =

Croatian actress

- Born: 1 January 1943 (age 83); Osijek, Independent State of Croatia
- Occupation: Actor
- Years active: 1967-present

Ingeborg "Inge" Appelt (born 1 January 1943) is a Croatian actress. She appeared in more than eighty films since 1967.

== Selected filmography ==
Year	Title	Role	Notes
2002	Fine Dead Girls		
1999	Marshal Tito's Spirit		
1985	Transylvania 6-5000 (1985 film)		
1977	Don't Lean Out the Window		
1970	Družba Pere Kvržice		
