= Tranquilizer Gun =

- Directed by: Hrvoje Hribar
- Written by: Hrvoje Hribar, Ivan Vidić
- Starring: Rene Medvešek; Alma Prica; Jelena Miholjević; Nina Violić; Filip Šovagović; Vili Matula; Igor Tkalec; Dražen Kühn
- Cinematography: Slobodan Trninić
- Edited by: Slaven Zečević
- Music by: Svadbas
- Production companies: FIZ, Croatian Radiotelevision
- Release date: 1997
- Running time: 116 minutes
- Country: Croatia
- Language: Croatian

Tranquilizer Gun (Puška za uspavljivanje) is a 1997 Croatian film directed by Hrvoje Hribar and starring Rene Medvešek, Alma Prica, Jelena Miholjević, and Nina Violić.

== Plot ==
Janko (Medvešek), a police officer, meets Marta (Prica), a widow of Karlo Štajner, a war profiteer who left his business in disarray. Janko can't decide between Marta and Nana (Violić), his kleptomaniac wife. Janko's affair with Marta unwittingly gets him involved in a complex criminal plot.

== Cast ==
- Rene Medvešek as Janko
- Alma Prica as Marta
- Nina Violić as Nana

== Reception ==
The critics praised the actors and the film's visual style, but found it lacking in energy and suffering from an overly complicated plot towards the end.

Tranquilizer Gun did not find success either at the Pula Film Festival or the Croatian box office - partly due to inadequate promotion - but received the 1998 Oktavijan Award from the Croatian Association of Film Critics.
