= Svetozar Vlajković =

Serbian radio journalist (born 1938)

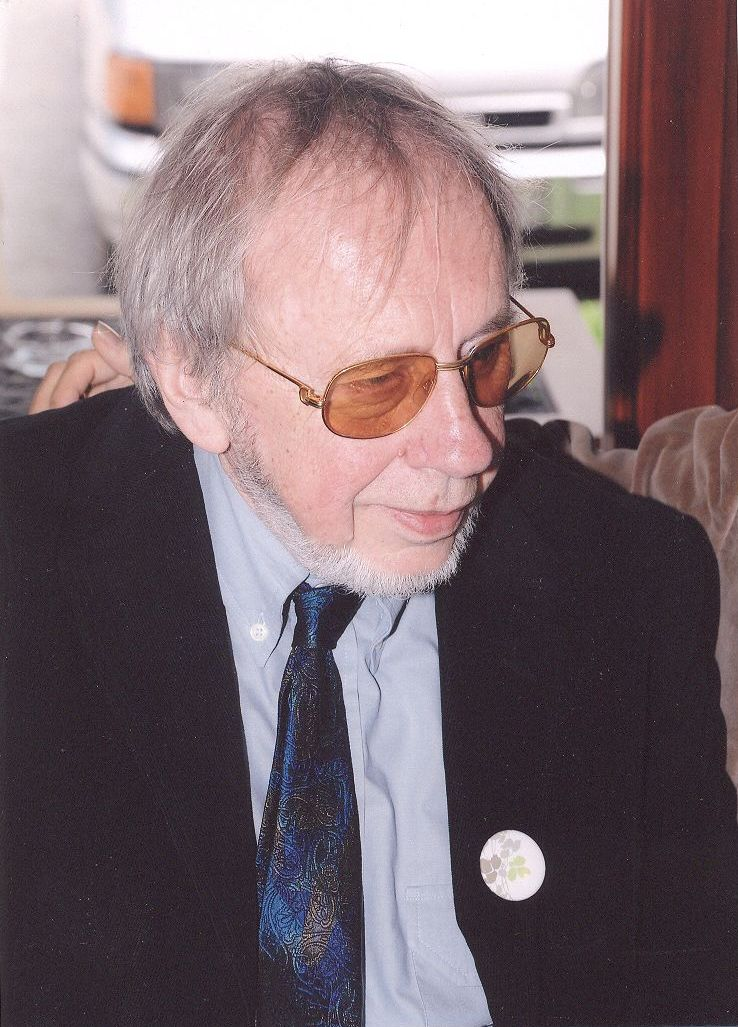
- Born: 5 January 1938 (age 88); Belgrade, Kingdom of Yugoslavia
- Occupations: Radio journalist, writer, screenwriter, playwright
- Writing career
- Language: Serbian

Svetozar Vlajković (Serbian Cyrillic: Светозар Влајковић, pronounced [sʋěːtozar ʋlǎːjkoʋitɕ]; born 5 January 1938) is a Serbian radio journalist, writer, screenwriter, playwright and laureate of the Isidora Sekulić Award in 1971.

== Biography ==
Vlajković grew up in Belgrade city quarter Čubura of Vračar municipality. He attended the XIV Belgrade Gymnasium, graduating with maturity diploma in 1956. After that, he studied at the Faculty of Law of Belgrade University and graduated with diploma in 1962. After completion of his academic education, he worked as court reporter of the newspaper Borba until 1963, there he realized that he was not living in a society of justice, that theory taught at university and judicial practice are two different things. Leaving his despised job, he started his professional career as radio journalist and contributing editor of cultural program of Radio Belgrade in the same year, but after six years, he was demoted in his job and restricted in his activities, because his views were inappropriate in ideological way of thinking. He left his job again, got a scholarship for going abroad and took the opportunity to study at Sorbonne in Paris, where he listened to lectures of theater studies and became assistant of Antoine Vitez from 1971-72.

Back in Belgrade again, he continued working at Radio Belgrade until retirement, in spite of numerous conflicts with the staff members who were refusing to apply new tendencies and ideas in the domain of radio program. In the meantime, he wrote twenty-five books of fiction and fifty plays of various genres. Svetozar Vlajković spent a big part of his professional life during Titoism, and he retrospectively describes the cultural atmosphere of this period as follows: Tito was an uneducated man, he became ruler thanks to a group of uneducated people. At the same time, these nations were also people of little faith and needed a strong leader. Tito surrounded himself with rude, arrogant, but obedient people. They chose their audience on the basis of a kinship decision, creating a pyramid of power that conquered the entire population. Only a few educated people were either exiled, liquidated or taken up into the pyramid. I have written a lot about influencing the suppression of our language, the decay of the family as the foundation of good education and spirituality, but what good is it if there's a well-established technique of silence.

== Works ==
=== Prose ===
At the beginning of his literary work, he was discovered by Serbian surrealists such as Marko Ristić and Dušan Matić and praised for his overflowing poetic fantasy and excessive power of imagination. Čedomir Mirković wrote a comment about his work in concise and short style: Vlajkovic's stories are characterized by a strong need to be skeptical, melancholy and lonely, the dominant feelings of today's city dwellers, reserved and disguised by irony, humor, curiosity, erotic enthusiasm in harmony with the Zeitgeist. Vlajković even distanced himself from the public marketing of literature in the positive as well as the negative sense and still expressed it with a certain sarcasm: manipulation by the media has attracted so much attention that even our thin readership in this country is completely confused. If the tabloid repeats five thousand times that someone is a genius, even if he is an idiot, he will penetrate as a certain significance in the consciousness of the readership. The crowd is ashamed to say that they do not like the official greatness. Luckily my readers are not part of this crowd.

- Šta bi učinio Zobec (What Zobec Would Do), short stories (novellas), Matica srpska, Novi Sad 1969.
- Šuma čudnovata (Miracle Forest), novel, Prosveta, Belgrade 1969.
- Neko drugo leto (Some Other Summer), novel, Prosveta, Belgrade 1971.
- Čubura, negde u Kaliforniji (Čubura, Somewhere in California), novel, Belgrade 1976.
- Večernji trkači (Evening Chasers), novel, Beogradski izdavačko-grafički zavod, 1980.
- Vera, novel, Nolit, Belgrade 1981.
- Pokretne stepenice (Moving Steps), novel, Nolit, Belgrade 1987, ISBN 86-19-01470-6.
- Ružičasti arhipelag (Pink Archipelago), novel, Altera, Belgrade 1991, ISBN 86-81459-17-1.
- Najslabiji učenik škole igranja (Worst Disciple Of Dancing School), novel, Rad, Belgrade 1992, ISBN 86-09-00298-5.
- Uzletanje (Taking Off), short stories, Rad, Belgrade 1997, ISBN 86-09-00527-5.
- Karamfla (Soldier Karamfla), novel, BMG, Belgrade 1998, ISBN 86-82005-57-3.
- Imenik (Phone Directory), novel, BMG, Belgrade 1998, ISBN 86-7330-037-1.
- Skladište uzdaha (Storeroom of Sighs), novel, Verzal press, Belgrade 1998, ISBN 86-7388-049-1.
- Tajanstvo spajanja (Mystery of Reunion), novel, Prosveta, Belgrade 2000, ISBN 86-07-01234-7.
- Rajska ptica: jazz priče (Bird of Paradise: Jazz Novellas), Bogdanović, Belgrade 2005, ISBN 86-85125-04-9.
- Sanja, novel, LOM, Belgrade 2006, ISBN 86-83499-85-5.
- Duga na sajmu knjiga (Rainbow At Book Fair), short stories, Nolit 2009, ISBN 978-86-19-02456-3.
- Stranac (The Stranger), novel, Artos, Belgrade 2012, ISBN 978-86-916315-0-5.

Vlajković wrote two books of essayistic memoirs:

- Don Žuan beogradski u šumi čudnovatoj (Don Juan Of Belgrade In Miracle Forest), Prosveta 2005, ISBN 86-07-01615-6.
- Pustinja u prašumi (Desert In The Jungle), Prosveta 2008, ISBN 978-86-07-01809-3.

=== Radio ===
Svetozar Vlajković has written dozens of radio dramas, dedicated a special attention in writing for and about children and received several radio awards.

- Poziv (Phone Call), 1976.
- Pesak u cipeli (Sand In The Shoe), 1981.

=== Theatre ===
Five plays by Svetozar Vlajković have been put on stage:

- Grejalica (The Heater), premiere at Atelje 212 Theatre, 1968.
- Stvari u vrtu (Objects in the Garden), Theatre Levo, Belgrade 1970.
- Seksualni horoskop (Sexual Horoscope), Omladinski dramski studio at Youth Theatre Novi Sad, 1972.
- Rastanak (Parting), premiere at Belgrade Drama Theatre, 1977.
- Zidanje (Construction Works), Yugoslav Drama Theatre (premiere of the performance was cancelled with no explanation), 1977.

The following theatre plays have been published in several magazines specialized in theatre:

- Večernji trkači (Evening Chasers), Scena (Stage), 1983
- Don Žuan beogradski (Don Juan Of Belgrade), Scena (Stage), 1986
- Ponavljač (Failure), Scena (Stage), 1991
- Marko&Musa, Savremena srpska drama (Contemporary Serbian Drama), 2006
- More u liftu (A Sea in the Elevator), Savremena srpska drama, 2008
- I nevidljivi voli vatromet (The Invisible Likes Fireworks Too), Savremena srpska drama, 2011.

=== Film ===
- Džangrizalo (Nagger), screenwriter, TV film 1976, directed by Zdravko Šotra.
- Džek-pot (Jackpot), screenwriter, TV film 1985.
- Zasluge (Merits), screenwriter, TV film 1972, based on a novel by Aleksandar Vučo.
- Prvo ubistvo (First Murder), TV film 1972, based on his novella Šta bi učinio Zobec.
- Bez reči (Without A Word), co-screenwriter, feature film 1972, directed by Miloš Radivojević.
- Kvar (Malfunction), co-screenwriter, feature film 1978, directed by Miloš Radivojević.
- Čavka (Jackdaw), co-screenwriter, children's film 1988, directed by Miloš Radivojević.
- Kako su me ukrali Nemci (How I Was Stolen By The Germans), co-screenwriter, feature film 2011.
- Dok su oni leteli na mesec (While They Were Flying To The Moon), short film 2015, based on his novella.
