= Jelena Miholjević =

Croatian actress

- Born: 27 September 1969 (age 56); Zagreb, Yugoslavia
- Occupation: Actress
- Years active: 1988-present
- Awards: Order of Danica Hrvatska

Jelena Miholjević (born 27 September 1969) is a Croatian actress. She appeared in more than thirty films since 1988.

== Selected filmography ==
Year	Title	Role	Notes
2013	Projections		
2005	Pušća Bistra		
1997	Tranquilizer Gun		
