= Early Snow in Munich =

- Directed by: Bogdan Žižić
- Written by: Rajko Grlić; Goran Massot
- Starring: Ute Fiedler; Iva Marjanović; Relja Bašić
- Cinematography: Goran Trbuljak
- Edited by: Martin Tomić
- Music by: Ozren Depolo
- Release date: 25 May 1984
- Running time: 90 minutes
- Country: Yugoslavia
- Language: Serbo-Croatian

Early Snow in Munich (Serbo-Croatian: Rani snijeg u Münchenu) is a 1984 Yugoslav film directed by Bogdan Žižić.
