= The Diary of Diana B. =

2019 film

- Croatian: Dnevnik Diane Budisavljević
- Directed by: Dana Budisavljević
- Screenplay by: Dana Budisavljević
- Based on: Dnevnik Diane Budisavljević 1941.–1945. by Diana Budisavljević
- Starring: Alma Prica; Biserka Ipša; Igor Samobor; Mirjana Karanović
- Music by: Alan Sinkauz; Nenad Sinkauz
- Production companies: Hulahop; December Film; This and That Productions
- Release date: 18 July 2019 (PFF)
- Running time: 88 minutes
- Countries: Croatia; Serbia; Slovenia
- Languages: Croatian; German

The Diary of Diana B. (Croatian: Dnevnik Diane Budisavljević) is a 2019 biographical film directed by Dana Budisavljević. The film tells the story of the aid operation of the Austrian humanitarian Diana Budisavljević during World War II in Yugoslavia. The film had its world premiere at the 2019 Pula Film Festival. It won four Golden Arenas, including the Big Golden Arena for Best Film.

== Cast ==
- Alma Prica as Diana Budisavljević
- Biserka Ipša as Ivanka Džakula
- Igor Samobor as Julije Budisavljević
- Ermin Bravo as Kamilo Bresler
- Areta Ćurković as Dragica Habazin
- Mirjana Karanović as Mira Kušević
- Vilim Matula as Sergeant Hecker
- Krešimir Mikić as Robert Stein
- Krunoslav Šarić as Đuro Vukosavljević
- Tihomir Stanić as Marko Vidaković
- Livio Badurina as Aloysius Stepinac
- Boris Ostan as Gustav von Koczian
- Barbara Prpić as Lydia Alexandra von Koczian
- Urša Raukar-Gamulin as the tailor

== Production ==
In June 2017, the European co-production fund Eurimages granted 160,000 EUR in support for the Croatian-Slovenian-Serbian co-production The DB Campaign (working title Diana's List) by Dana Budisavljević.

The feature film was retitled The Diary of Diana B. and its world premiere was at the Pula Film Festival on 18 July 2019.

== Reception ==
The film was awarded with the Big Golden Arena for Best Film, Golden Arena for Best Director, Golden Arena for Editing, Golden Arena for Best Music, Golden Gate of Pula Audience Award and recognition for Best Croatian Feature Film.
