= Gordana Boban =

Bosnian actress

- Born: 13 September 1967 (age 59); Livno, SR Bosnia and Herzegovina, Yugoslavia
- Occupation: Actress
- Years active: 1982–present

Gordana Boban (born 13 September 1967) is a Bosnian actress. She graduated in Academy of Performing Arts in Sarajevo in class of professor Boro Stjepanović.

Currently, she is acting in Kamerni teatar 55, a theater in Sarajevo.

== Early life ==
Since early childhood, she was a member of the Cultural-Art Society "Radnik" from Livno, during which she appeared in several roles of Amateur Theater Livno during the 1980s.

== Filmography ==
Films

- Mliječni put (2000)
- Gori vatra (2003)
- Nafaka (2006)
- Kenjac (2006)
- The Widower (2026)

Television

- Lud, zbunjen, normalan (2007-2009)
