= Ni na nebu ni na zemlji =

1994 film by Miloš Radivojević

- Directed by: Miloš Radivojević
- Starring: Svetozar Cvetković; Bojana Maljevic
- Release date: 2 July 1994
- Running time: 100 min
- Country: Federal Republic of Yugoslavia
- Language: Serbian

Ni na nebu ni na zemlji is a 1994 Serbian drama film directed by Miloš Radivojević.

== Cast ==
- Svetozar Cvetković - Nikola
- Bojana Maljević - Ana
- Branislav Lečić - Stole
- Zoran Cvijanović - Pop
- Dragan Nikolić - Igla
- Maja Sabljić - Manuela
- Dragan Zarić - Obrad kelner
- Sonja Savić - Crvenokosa
- Nenad Jezdić - Vlada
- Aleksandar Berček - Ujak Krsta
- Goran Daničić - Kinez
- Bogdan Diklić - Svetislav
