= Don't Lean Out the Window =

- Directed by: Bogdan Žižić
- Written by: Krunoslav Quien; Bogdan Žižić
- Starring: Ivo Gregurević; Fabijan Šovagović; Mira Banjac; Jadranka Stilin; Zdenko Jelčić; Inge Appelt
- Cinematography: Branko Blažina
- Edited by: Martin Tomić
- Music by: Ozren Depolo
- Production companies: Jadran Film; Croatia Film
- Release date: 1977
- Running time: 103 minutes
- Country: Yugoslavia
- Language: Serbo-Croatian

Don't Lean Out the Window (Serbo-Croatian: Ne naginji se van), is a 1977 Yugoslav drama film directed by Bogdan Žižić.

The film won two Golden Arena awards at the 1977 Pula Film Festival, for Best Film and for Best Supporting Actress (Mira Banjac).

== Plot ==
Filip, a young man from the Dalmatian hinterland, goes to Frankfurt looking for a job. He is enticed by the example of his compatriot Mate, who Filip believes made a fortune working in Germany. Upon his arrival in Frankfurt, he is unable to get in touch with Mate, so he takes a black market construction job working under Čikeš, a corrupt boss. He gets injured in a work accident, and experiences a series of discouraging setbacks. While his spirits are lifted by a romantic relationship with Verica, a saleswoman in a record store, over time he realizes he has no reason to stay...
