= Fedor Škubonja =

- Born: 22 July 1924; Murter, Kingdom of Yugoslavia (present-day Croatia)
- Died: 24 April 2008 (aged 83); Bol, Croatia
- Occupation(s): Director, writer
- Years active: 1950–1983
- Spouse: Stanislava Borisavljević

Fedor Škubonja (22 July 1924 – 24 April 2008) was a Yugoslav and Croatian film director.

== Biography ==
Škubonja spent most of his career making children's films. His most notable film was the award-winning 1960 Yugoslav film The Lost Pencil (Croatian: Izgubljena olovka), which won the Golden Lion for Best Children's Film at the 1961 Venice Film Festival, and was named as one of the top ten children's films of all time at the 1966 Cannes Film Festival.

His other notable film was the 1969 film Downstream from the Sun (Nizvodno od sunca), a social drama set in a remote mountain village, which earned him a Golden Arena for Best Director at the 1969 Pula Film Festival.

Škubonja was married to screenwriter Stanislava Borisavljević who wrote screenplays for most of his films.
