= Here (2003 film) =

- Directed by: Zrinko Ogresta
- Written by: Zrinko Ogresta; Josip Mlakić
- Produced by: Ivan Maloca
- Starring: Jasmin Telalovic
- Cinematography: Davorin Gecl
- Edited by: Josip Podvorac
- Release date: 2003
- Running time: 90 minutes
- Country: Croatia
- Language: Croatian
- Budget: HRK 7.8 million (c. €1 million)

Here (Croatian: Tu) is a 2003 Croatian film directed by Zrinko Ogresta.

The film was first released at the Pula Film Festival on 21 July 2003, where it won the Big Golden Arena for Best Film and Zlatko Crnković received the Golden Arena for Best Actor. In July 2004, it was nominated for the Crystal Globe and won the Special Jury Prize at the 39th Karlovy Vary International Film Festival. It also won the Best Feature Film at the Milan Film Festival, the Krzysztof Kieslowski Award at the Denver International Film Festival, and the Critics Award at the Montpellier Mediterranean Film Festival.

== Cast ==
- Jasmin Telalović - Kavi
- Marija Tadić - Duda
- Zlatko Crnković - Josip
- Ivo Gregurević - Boris
- Ivan Herceg - Karlo
- Nikola Ivosević - Lala
- Miraj Grbić - Žutan
