= Žarko Dragojević =

- Born: 5 May 1954 (age 71); Prokuplje, Yugoslavia (present-day Serbia)
- Occupation(s): Director, screenwriter
- Years active: 1978–1991

Žarko Dragojević (Serbian Cyrillic: Жарко Драгојевић; born 5 May 1954) is a Serbian film director and screenwriter.

== Career ==
He spent most of his career in Yugoslav television, but he also directed a couple of acclaimed feature films, including The House by the Railway Tracks, which won him both the Golden Arena for Best Director and the Golden Arena for Best Screenplay at the Yugoslav Film awards in 1988.
