= Bogdan Žižić =

Croatian film director and screenwriter (1934–2021)

- Born: 8 November 1934; Solin, Kingdom of Yugoslavia
- Died: 29 April 2021 (aged 86); Zagreb, Croatia
- Occupations: Film director, screenwriter
- Years active: 1964–1998
- Awards: Order of Danica Hrvatska

Bogdan Žižić (8 November 1934 – 29 April 2021) was a Croatian film director and screenwriter. Žižić was regarded as one of the most prolific Croatian directors of short documentary films, and was also known for several critically acclaimed feature films made in the 1970s.

Žižić had graduated from the University of Zagreb Faculty of Law before taking up filmmaking in the early 1960s. From 1960 to 1964 he worked as a dramaturge at the Zagreb Film production company, and he had his directing debut with the 1964 film The Flood (Croatian: Poplava), a documentary about the 1964 Zagreb flood. He went on to make a number of acclaimed documentaries in the 1960s and 1970s, mostly dealing with social issues and art.

After making a few surrealist experimental short films in the early 1970s, Žižić started making feature films, his most notable works being The House (Kuća, 1975) and Don't Lean Out the Window (Ne naginji se van, 1977), which both won the Big Golden Arena for Best Film awards at the 1975 and 1977 editions of the Pula Film Festival. This made him the only film director whose first two feature films both won the award.

In the second half of the 1980s and in the early 1990s Žižić served as head of Zagreb Film. In 2008 Žižić was awarded the Vladimir Nazor Award for Life Achievement, and in 2009 Žižić was named as the inaugural winner of the Honorary Stamp life achievement award "for contributions to documentary filmmaking" at the 2009 ZagrebDox film festival, along with American filmmaker Jon Alpert.

== Filmography ==
- The House (Kuća, 1975)
- Don't Lean Out the Window (Ne naginji se van, 1977)
- Whatever You Can Spare (Daj što daš, 1979)
- Early Snow in Munich (Rani snijeg u Münchenu, 1984)
- The Price of Life (Cijena života, 1994)
