= Svadbas =

Svadbas is a rock band from Croatia founded in 1994. They are notable for several hits and soundtracks for the movie Fine Dead Girls (2002). Their song "Treblebass" won a Porin award for Song of the Year in 2006. They have also been voted Best Croatian Newcomer.

== Members ==
- Pavle Miholjević
- Jura Ferina
- Ljubica Gurdulić
- Bojan Gaćina
- Ana-Maria Ocvirk
- Marko Kalčić

== Discography ==
=== Albums ===
- Svadbas (Dallas Records, 1997)
- Jug (Dan, Mrak, 2000)
- Sami (Alka Records, 2001)
- F.M.D. sessions (Menart, 2002)
- La La (DOP - Menart, 2005)
- Još (2012)
