= The Staffroom =

2021 film

- Croatian: Zbornica
- Directed by: Sonja Tarokić
- Written by: Sonja Tarokić
- Produced by: Ankica Jurić-Tilić
- Starring: Marina Redžepović; Stojan Matavulj; Nives Ivanković
- Cinematography: Danko Vučinović
- Edited by: Borna Buljević
- Production company: Kinorama
- Release date: 22 August 2021 (Karlovy Vary International Film Festival)
- Running time: 126 minutes
- Country: Croatia
- Language: Croatian

The Staffroom (Croatian: Zbornica) is a 2021 Croatian drama film, the feature film debut of writer and director Sonja Tarokić.

The film premiered at the Karlovy Vary International Film Festival in August 2021, and won the Big Golden Arena for Best Film almost a year later at the July 2022 Pula Film Festival, the event which serves as the Croatian national film awards.

== Plot ==
Entirely set at an elementary school in Zagreb, a new school counselor Anamarija arrives and tries to navigate helping students with complicated and entrenched inner workings of the school, inevitably on a collision course with the headmistress Vedrana and an old history teacher in his sixties, Siniša.

== Cast ==
- Marina Redžepović as Anamarija
- Stojan Matavulj as Siniša Jambrović
- Nives Ivanković as Vedrana
- Maja Posavec as Ivana
- Sandra Lončarić as Sanda
