= Dejan Karaklajić =

Serbian television and film director (born 1946)

- Born: 1 May 1946 (age 79); Belgrade, Yugoslavia (present-day Serbia)
- Occupation: Film director
- Years active: 1968–1981

Dejan Karaklajić (born 1 May 1946 in Belgrade) is a Serbian television and film director.

== Career ==
Karaklajić was active from the late 1960s through to the early 1980s and mainly worked on television films made by Radiotelevizija Beograd (today called Radio Television of Serbia). He also directed two feature films, Beloved Love (Ljubavni život Budimira Trajkovića, 1977; starring Milena Dravić and Ljubiša Samardžić) and Erogenous Zone (Erogena zona, 1981).
