= Sonja Tarokić =

Croatian film director and screenwriter (born 1988)

- Born: 19 March 1988 (age 38); Zagreb, SFR Yugoslavia
- Occupations: Film director, screenwriter

Sonja Tarokić (born 19 March 1983) is a Croatian film director and screenwriter.

Born in Zagreb, Tarokić earned an MA in film directing from the University of Zagreb's Academy of Dramatic Art (ADU), and a BA in comparative literature from the Faculty of Humanities and Social Sciences (FFZG).

After making several short films throughout the early 2010s, her 2021 feature film debut, The Staffroom, earned her the Golden Arena for Best Director at the 2022 Pula Film Festival.
