= Faruk Sokolović =

Bosnian film director, producer and screenwriter

- Born: 18 September 1952 (age 73); Sarajevo, PR Bosnia and Herzegovina, FPR Yugoslavia
- Occupations: film director, television producer, actor, screenwriter
- Years active: 1976–present
- Spouse: Šuhreta Duda Sokolović

Faruk Sokolović (born 18 September 1952) is a Bosnian film director, television producer, actor and screenwriter.

== Filmography ==
=== Films ===
Year	Film	Director	Producer	Writer	Actor	Notes
2000	Mliječni put	Yes		Yes		English title: Milky Way
2000	Tunel	Yes		Yes		

=== Television ===
Year	Film	Director	Producer	Writer	Actor	Notes
1976	Sjeverno od sunca	Yes				film; assistant director
1984	Skretničar				Yes	film
1984	Provincija u pozadini	Yes				film
1985	Srebrna lisica	Yes			Yes	film
1986	Ja sam starinski ormar	Yes				film
1986	Ne znate vi Martina	Yes				film
1988	Zagubljen govor	Yes				series; 6 episodes
1988	Inat	Yes				film
1989	Čovjek koji je znao gdje je sjever a gdje jug				Yes	film
1990	Majstori mraka	Yes				film
1991	Sarajevske priče	Yes		Yes		series; 4 episodes
2002	Viza za budućnost: Novogodišnji special		Yes			special
2002–2008	Viza za budućnost	Yes	Yes			series; 206 episodes
2003	Viza za budućnost: Novogodišnji special		Yes			special
2004	Crna hronika	Yes				series; 200 episodes
2004	Viza za budućnost: Novogodišnji special		Yes			special
2006	Viza za budućnost: Mikrofon je vaš	Yes				series; 2 episodes
2006–2007	Tata i zetovi	Yes	Yes			series; 26 episodes
2008–2009	Pečat	Yes	Yes	Yes		series; 16 episodes
2011	Foliranti	Yes	Yes			series; 15 episodes
