= Milky Way (2000 film) =

- Directed by: Faruk Sokolović
- Written by: Faruk Sokolović; Almir Imširević; Edina Kamenica
- Produced by: Šuhreta Duda Sokolović
- Starring: Žan Marolt; Gordana Boban; Dragan Bjelogrlić; Selma Alispahić
- Cinematography: Stipo Svetinović
- Edited by: Bojan Filipović
- Music by: Zlatan Fazlić
- Release date: 21 December 2000
- Running time: 93 minutes
- Countries: Bosnia and Herzegovina
- Language: Bosnian

Milky Way (Bosnian: Mliječni put) is a 2000 Bosnian film directed by Faruk Sokolović.

== Cast ==
- Žan Marolt as Mujo Hrle
- Gordana Boban as Sena
- Dragan Bjelogrlić as Ale
- Selma Alispahić as Anka
- Davor Janjić as Josip
- Nada Đurevska as Fata
- Ante Vican as Stjepan
- Ada Sokolović as Dalila
- Hana Sokolović as Denis
- Ivo Gregurević as Službenik
- Nebojša Veljović as Prodavac
