= Ikon Arts Foundation =

American non-profit organization

- Formation: 2013; 13 years ago
- Type: Not for profit
- Headquarters: New York City, New York, U.S.
- Services: Arts and culture
- Board of directors: Katarina Milicevic, Linda Mateljan
- Website: ikonartsfoundation.org

Ikon Arts Foundation is a not-for-profit organization to inspire engagement with creative culture in the United States.

== Overview ==
Ikon Arts Foundation was established in 2014 and is headquartered in New York City. The organization promotes and connects creative culture in the US in the creative and commercial industries.

Ikon Arts Foundation produces the Ikon Review digital platform that enables readers to discover the work of artists, designers and filmmakers from Croatia. It also produces art and film screenings, design exhibitions and creative marketing projects, and also aims to be the English-language resource that features the creative work and personalities.

Ikon Arts Foundation presented a selection of contemporary product design during New York Design Week in 2015 to showcase design creativity and talent.

Artist Marko Tadic's work was exhibited by Ikon Arts Foundation at PULSE Contemporary Art Fair at PULSE New York in 2014.

Ikon Arts Foundation published a book on contemporary photographers entitled DIS / Inheritance: New Photography in 2018 (Author: Don Mengay, Creative Director: Linda Mateljan).
