= Selma Alispahić =

Bosnian actress (born 1970)

- Born: 10 March 1970 (age 56); Tuzla, SR Bosnia and Herzegovina, Yugoslavia
- Occupation: Actress
- Years active: 1995–present

Selma Alispahić (born 10 March 1970) is a Bosnian actress.

== Biography ==
Alispahić was born in Tuzla, Bosnia and Herzegovina in 1970.

== Filmography ==
=== Films ===
- Elgars Tenth Muse (1996)
- Milky Way (2000)
- Broken Mussels (2011)
- A Stranger (2013)
- Selam (2013)
- Agata the Writer (2026)

=== Television ===
- Memoari porodice Milić (1991)
- Bliss (1995; television film)
- Bez rizika (2011)
- Jack Ryan (2022)
- I Know Your Soul (2023)

=== Shorts ===
- Igraj do kraja (2000)
- Priča bez kraja (2012)
