= Koža (TV series) =

Serbian thriller drama television miniseries

- Genre: Drama, Thriller
- Created by: Nikola Pejaković
- Written by: Nikola Pejaković
- Directed by: Saša Hajduković
- Starring: Nikola Pejaković, Aleksandar Jovanović, Nebojša Dugalić, Vesna Trivalić, Ljubomir Bandović
- Country of origin: Serbia
- Original language: Serbian
- No. of seasons: 1
- No. of episodes: 5

Production
- Running time: ~50 minutes
- Production company: Bosonoga produkcija

Original release
- Network: RTS 1
- Release: January 20 – February 18, 2024

Koža (Кожа, lit. Skin) is a Serbian thriller drama television miniseries directed by Saša Hajduković and written by Nikola Pejaković. It premiered on RTS 1 on January 20, 2024 and concluded on February 18, 2024. The series is the third and final part of Pejaković’s unofficial Banja Luka trilogy, following the earlier series Meso (2017) and Kosti (2020).

== Premise ==
After serving a lengthy prison sentence for drug-related offenses, Slobodan Milošević returns to his hometown of Banja Luka from The Hague. Once a gifted musician and student in the Netherlands, his life descended into heroin addiction and involvement in the Belgrade underworld. Upon release, he must confront the ghosts of his past—including the trauma of the Yugoslav Wars, betrayal by friends, and shattered relationships—while navigating a city transformed by time and war. The story explores his inner battle with addiction, trauma, and the quest for redemption in a fractured post-Yugoslav society.

== Cast ==
- Nikola Pejaković as Slobodan Milošević
- Aleksandar Jovanović as young Slobodan Milošević
- Nebojša Dugalić as Slobodan's father Vladan
- Vesna Trivalić as Slobodan's aunt Natalija
- Ljubomir Bandović as Gojko Šljivar Goja

== Production ==
Koža was produced by Bosonoga produkcija in cooperation with Radio Television of Serbia. Like its predecessors in the trilogy, the series was filmed primarily in Banja Luka and Belgrade, with a focus on realism, raw dialogue, and psychological complexity. Director Saša Hajduković brought a minimalist visual style to the series, emphasizing intimate character moments and stark urban environments.

== See also ==
- Meso
- Kosti
- Banja Luka
- Bosonoga produkcija
- Radio Television of Serbia
