= No One's Son =

- Croatian: Ničiji sin
- Directed by: Arsen Anton Ostojić
- Written by: Mate Matišić
- Based on: Ničiji sin by Mate Matišić
- Produced by: Jozo Patljak
- Starring: Alen Liverić; Mustafa Nadarević; Biserka Ipša; Zdenko Jelčić; Goran Grgić; Daria Lorenci
- Cinematography: Branko Linta; Slobodan Trninić
- Edited by: Dubravko Slunjski
- Music by: Mate Matišić
- Release dates: 16 October 2008 (Warsaw Film Festival); 8 January 2009 (Croatia)
- Running time: 100 minutes
- Country: Croatia
- Language: Croatian

No One's Son (Croatian: Ničiji sin) is a 2008 Croatian film directed by Arsen Anton Ostojić. It is based on a play by Mate Matišić. The film won the Big Golden Arena for Best Film at the 2008 Pula Film Festival, the Croatian national film awards.

== Reception ==
"The film is based on the play of the same name by Mata Matišić, so it is to blame for the clumsy dramatic structure in which the central part of the action is a large, occasionally not very clear flashback. Politically speaking, the film has a devastating content, with the message that the current Croatian reality is built on false foundations, but the effect is modest, because the viewer stops caring about what is happening on the screen already after half an hour.", wrote Nenad Polimac.

Željko Luketić found: "Ostojić's directorial habitus is lax and relies entirely on old social-realist tricks in which every ostensibly dramatic sequence is thickened like Pavlov's dog with loud music, dramatic cuts or flashbacks. Ostojić also adheres to the typical pamphlet procedure in which the hero's disability does not represent a dramatic motive or trigger, but is there to simply cause regret. For that man without legs, the only worse thing in his life would be to find out that he is a Serb. All of this will be played backwards, so that the strongest scenes are at the beginning, and the weaker ones towards the end, with only a sequence in between that draws dynamics from the soap opera, in such a way that when someone says something important, a gong sounds. The suffering of the characters is visible even without the clichés about bad-good Serbs and Croats".
