= The Living and the Dead (2007 film) =

- Croatian: Živi i mrtvi
- Directed by: Kristijan Milić
- Written by: Miro Barnjak; Ivan Pavličić
- Based on: Živi i mrtvi by Josip Mlakić
- Produced by: Marijo Vukadin; Igor Nola; Domagoj Pavić; Miro Barnjak
- Starring: Filip Šovagović; Velibor Topić
- Cinematography: Dragan Marković
- Edited by: Goran Guberović
- Music by: Andrija Milić
- Production companies: Olimp Produkcija; Ultimativne Medijske Atrakcije; Mainframe Productions; Porta Produkcija
- Release date: 20 July 2007
- Running time: 87 minutes
- Country: Bosnia and Herzegovina
- Language: Croatian

The Living and the Dead (Croatian: Živi i mrtvi) is a 2007 Croatian horror film directed by Kristijan Milić.

It tells the story of Bosnian Croat (HVO) fighters who, by in the Croat–Bosniak War (1992–1994), encounter something not entirely of this world. The film was released in 2007. It was filmed in Prozor-Rama, Bosnia and Herzegovina. In 2007, the film won the Big Golden Arena for Best Film at the Pula Film Festival.

== Plot ==
In 1943, group of Croatian soldiers overtake a strategically important point in western Bosnia with a goal to destroy a group of communist Partisans. On the way they met some supernatural phenomena, and the action itself went very badly because the Partisans ambushed them. The main character Martin inherits silver cigarette case from a dying soldier. This act connects to the story in 1993 when we meet Martin's grandson Tomo. He is one of six soldiers of the Croatian army who have come to the same place in Bosnia to meet the same phenomena and similar fate.

== Cast ==
- Filip Šovagović as Tomo / Martin
- Velibor Topić as Vijali
- Slaven Knezović as Coro
- Marinko Prga as Mali
- Borko Perić as Robe
- Miro Barnjak as Ivo
- Božidar Orešković as the commander
- Enes Vejzović as Ferid / the ARBIH soldier at the cabin
- Izudin Bajrović as Stojan
- Ljubomir Jurković as Semin
- Robert Roklicer as Captain Dane Boro
- Zvonko Zečević as First Lieutenant Knez
- Dragan Suvak as the shot Partisan
- Nino Soric as Pejo

== Release ==
=== Home media ===
The film was released on DVD in the United States by TLA Releasing on 25 March 2008. It was later released by DNC on 19 May that same year.
