= Kristijan Milić =

Croatian film director

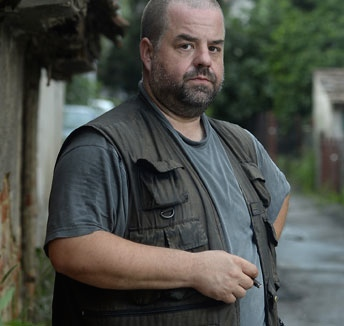
- Born: 25 December 1969 (age 56); Zagreb, SR Croatia, Yugoslavia
- Occupation: Film director
- Years active: 2002–present

Kristijan Milić (pronounced [krǐstijan mǐːlitɕ]; born 25 December 1969) is a Croatian television and feature film director.

He is best known for winning two awards Golden Arena for Best Director at the Pula Film Festival (Croatian national film awards) for his feature films The Living and the Dead (Živi i Mrtvi; 2007) and Number 55 (Broj 55; 2014).

Milić is also well known for TV series Najbolje godine (2009–2011).
