= Number 55 =

- Film poster
- Directed by: Kristijan Milić
- Written by: Ivan Pavličić
- Starring: Goran Bogdan; Alan Katić
- Cinematography: Mirko Pivčević
- Edited by: Veljko Segarić
- Production company: Croatian Radiotelevision
- Release date: 20 July 2014 (PFF)
- Running time: 104 minutes
- Country: Croatia
- Language: Croatian

Number 55 (Croatian: Broj 55) is a 2014 Croatian war film directed by Kristijan Milić, billed as "the first action movie" about the 1991–95 Croatian War of Independence.

Shot in the area of Velika Gorica, the film won eight Golden Arenas, including the Big Golden Arena for Best Film. The cast also includes Luka Peroš best known for his role of Marseille in Money Heist.

== Plot ==
Movie takes place during the Independence War in Croatia. The film is based on a true story that happened on the eve in autumn of 1991 in the small Croatian village of Kusonje, near Pakrac. A small group of Croatian soldiers went on a patrol in an improvised armored car that they had made. In Kusonje, they get ambushed by Serb forces and are forced to hide in a nearby abandoned house that bears the house number 55. Their resistance to the rebeling forces, the JNA and Serbian special forces takes almost 24 hours. In parallel, the film follows the efforts of their fellow soldiers to pull them out of the encirclement.
