= Zrinko Ogresta =

Croatian film director and screenwriter (1958–2026)

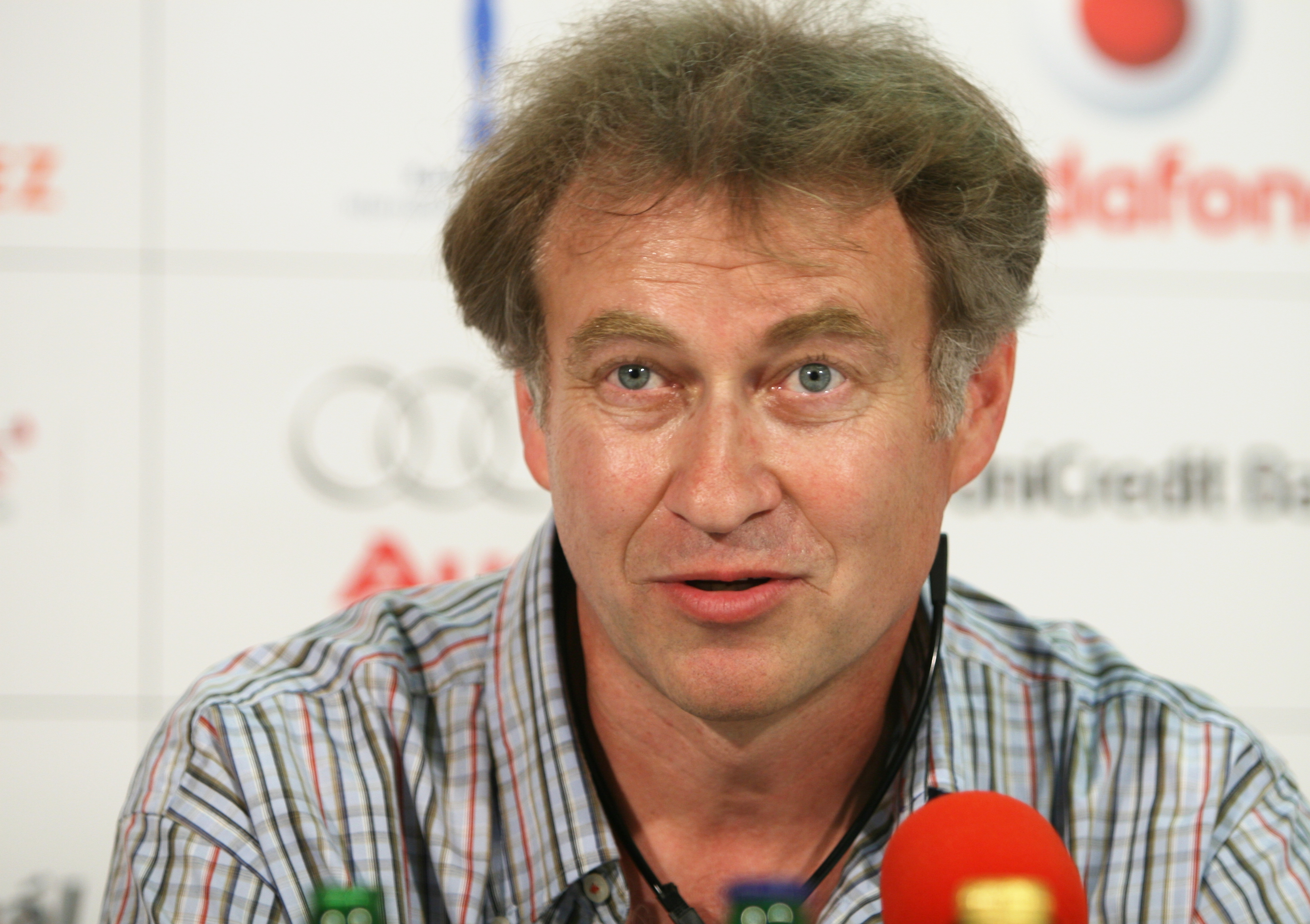
- Ogresta in 2008
- Born: 5 October 1958; Virovitica, PR Croatia, FPR Yugoslavia (modern Croatia)
- Died: 3 July 2026 (aged 67); Zagreb, Croatia
- Years active: 1982–2026
- Relatives: Željka (sister)
- Awards: Golden Arena for Best Director; 1995 – Washed Out; 1999 – Red Dust; 2016 – On the Other Side; 2021 – A Blue Flower

Zrinko Ogresta (5 October 1958 – 3 July 2026) was a Croatian screenwriter and film director, who was professor of film directing at the Academy of Dramatic Arts in Zagreb and a member of the European Film Academy in Berlin. Praised for their strong visual style, well articulated mise-en-scène and innovative storytelling, his films focus on the anxieties that lurk behind the well cultivated bourgeois facade of the characters, using their emotional and psychological fractures to bring to light the complexes that haunt the society in general, while subtly analysing social and political forces behind it.

Ogresta's films were screened and awarded at renowned international and local festivals (Berlin, Venice, Karlovy Vary, London, Montpellier, Denver, Milan, Pula...). Some of the most notable prizes are the nomination for European Film Award in the category of best young director for the film Fragments, Prix Italia for the film Washed Out, the Special Jury Prize at the Karlovy Vary festival for the film Here and a Special Mention at the Berlinale for the film On the other side.

Ogresta died on 3 July 2026, at the age of 67.

== Filmography ==
- 1991 – Fragments: Chronicle of a Vanishing (Croatian: Krhotine - Kronika jednog nestajanja); writer and director
- 1995 – Washed Out (Isprani); writer and director
- 1999 – Red Dust (Crvena prašina); director
- 2003 – Here (Tu); writer and director
- 2008 – Behind the Glass (Iza stakla); co-writer and director
- 2013 – Projections (Projekcije); director
- 2016 – On the Other Side (S one strane); writer and director
- 2021 – A Blue Flower (Plavi cvijet); director
