= Washed Out (film) =

- Directed by: Zrinko Ogresta
- Starring: Katarina Bistrović-Darvaš; Josip Kučan; Mustafa Nadarević
- Cinematography: Davorin Gecl
- Edited by: Josip Podvorec
- Music by: Jasenko Houra
- Production company: Jadran Film/Croatian Radiotelevision
- Distributed by: Jadran Film/Croatian Radiotelevision
- Release date: 1995
- Running time: 92 minutes
- Country: Croatia
- Language: Croatian

Washed Out (Croatian: Isprani) is a 1995 Croatian film directed by Zrinko Ogresta. The film was selected as the Croatian entry for the Best Foreign Language Film at the 68th Academy Awards, but was not accepted as a nominee. The winner of the Prix Italia (1996) for the best fiction.

== Cast ==
- Katarina Bistrović-Darvaš as Jagoda
- Josip Kučan as Zlatko
- Filip Šovagović as Tukša
- Mustafa Nadarević as Father
- Božidarka Frajt as Mother
- Ivo Gregurević as Ivo
- Božidar Orešković
- Tarik Filipović
- Sreten Mokrović

== See also ==
- List of submissions to the 68th Academy Awards for Best Foreign Language Film
- List of Croatian submissions for the Academy Award for Best Foreign Language Film
