= Fine Dead Girls =

2002 film

- English-language DVD cover released by the Global Film Initiative
- Croatian: Fine mrtve djevojke
- Directed by: Dalibor Matanić
- Written by: Dalibor Matanić, Mate Matišić
- Produced by: Jozo Patljak
- Starring: Olga Pakalović; Nina Violić; Krešimir Mikić; Inge Appelt; Ivica Vidović; Milan Štrljić
- Cinematography: Branko Linta
- Edited by: Tomislav Pavlić
- Music by: Jura Ferina, Pavle Miholjević
- Production company: Alka-Film Zagreb
- Release date: 24 July 2002 (Croatia)
- Running time: 77 minutes
- Country: Croatia
- Language: Croatian
- Budget: €450,000

Fine Dead Girls (Croatian: Fine mrtve djevojke; also distributed internationally as Nice Dead Girls) is a 2002 Croatian drama film that premiered in July 2002, at the Pula Film Festival. The film has been named one of the best Croatian films since Croatia's independence. It caught much attention due to its controversial, provocative themes.

== Plot ==
Iva (Olga Pakalović) and Marija (Nina Violić), a lesbian couple, rent an apartment in Zagreb in a building that seems to provide a quiet and safe environment for their love, but over time the atmosphere in the building becomes more and more threatening.

The elder landlady Olga (Inge Appelt) dominates the building. Other tenants include her calm husband, her grown-up son Daniel (Krešimir Mikić) who has a crush on Iva, the prostitute Lidija (Jadranka Đokić), an abused housewife, a widower keeping the corpse of his newly deceased wife, a gynecologist (Boris Miholjević) performing abortions in one flat of the house, and an ex-soldier who regularly plays martial music at night. The characters are meant to display the madness of the post-war Croatian society.

Marija's conservative religious father secretly stalks his daughter, and pays Lidija to try to seduce Iva, which fails.

After Olga finds out that Iva and Marija are lesbians, the situation escalates to rape, murder and kidnapping.

== Cast ==
- Olga Pakalović as Iva
- Nina Violić as Marija
- Krešimir Mikić as Daniel
- Inge Appelt as Olga the Landlady
- Ivica Vidović as Blaž
- Milan Štrljić as Inspektor
- Mirko Boman
- Jadranka Đokić as Lidija the Prostitute
- Boris Miholjević as Perić the Gynecologist
- Marina Poklepović as Marina Kostelac
- Janko Rakos
- Ilija Zovko

== Awards and nominations ==
=== Pula Film Festival 2002 ===
- Audience Award "Golden Gate Pula"
- Big Golden Arena
- Golden Arena
  - Best Actor in a Supporting Role: Ivica Vidović
  - Best Actress in a Supporting Role: Olga Pakalović
  - Best Director: Dalibor Matanić

=== Geneva Cinéma Tout Ecran 2003 ===
- Young Jury Award – Dalibor Matanić

=== Sochi International Film Festival and Awards 2003 ===
- Special Jury Award – Dalibor Matanić (tied with At kende sandheden (2002))
- Golden Rose – Dalibor Matanić (nominated)

=== 75th Academy Awards ===
- Croatia's submission for the Academy Award for Best Foreign Language Film (not nominated)
