= Story from Croatia =

1991 film by Krsto Papić

- Directed by: Krsto Papić
- Screenplay by: Krsto Papić
- Story by: Mate Matišić
- Produced by: Nikola Babić
- Starring: Ivo Gregurević; Mustafa Nadarević; Dragan Despot
- Cinematography: Vjekoslav Vrdoljak
- Edited by: Robert Lisjak
- Production companies: Urania Film; Croatian Radiotelevision
- Release date: 1991
- Running time: 110 minutes
- Country: Croatia
- Language: Croatian

Story from Croatia (Croatian: Priča iz Hrvatske; also distributed internationally as Idaho Potato, after the English-named rock band led by the film's protagonist) is a 1991 Croatian film directed by Krsto Papić. It was Croatia's submission to the 65th Academy Awards for the Academy Award for Best Foreign Language Film, but was not accepted as a nominee.

== Cast ==
- Ivo Gregurević as Luka
- Mustafa Nadarević as Andrija
- Dragan Despot as Ilija
- Zoja Odak as Luka's Wife
- Vedrana Međimorec as Andrija's Wife
- Robert Belinić as Ivan (boy)
- Ana Mamić as Marina (girl)
- Kristijan Ugrina as Ivan (adult)
- Maja Ružić as Marina (adult)
- Martin Sagner as Neighbour
- Nada Abrus as Gertrude Schmidt
- Nada Gačešić-Livaković

== See also ==
- Cinema of Croatia
- List of submissions to the 65th Academy Awards for Best Foreign Language Film
- List of Croatian submissions for the Academy Award for Best Foreign Language Film
