= On the Other Side (film) =

2016 film

- Film poster
- Directed by: Zrinko Ogresta
- Written by: Mate Matišić; Zrinko Ogresta
- Starring: Ksenija Marinković; Lazar Ristovski; Tihana Lazović
- Music by: Mate Matišić; Simun Matišić
- Release dates: 14 February 2016 (Berlin); 10 March 2016 (Croatia); 10 March 2016 (Serbia)
- Running time: 85 minutes
- Countries: Croatia; Serbia
- Language: Croatian

On the Other Side (Croatian: S one strane) is a 2016 Croatian-Serbian drama film directed by Zrinko Ogresta. It was shown in the Panorama section at the 66th Berlin International Film Festival. The film received a Special Mention from the Europa Cinema Label jury. It was selected as the Croatian entry for the Best Foreign Language Film at the 89th Academy Awards but it was not nominated.

== Cast ==
- Ksenija Marinković as Vesna
- Lazar Ristovski as Zarko
- Tihana Lazović as Jadranka
- Robert Budak as Vladimir
- Toni Šestan as Bozo
- Tena Jeić-Gajski as Nives
- Vinko Kraljević as Peric
- Ivan Brkić as Mato

== See also ==
- List of submissions to the 89th Academy Awards for Best Foreign Language Film
- List of Croatian submissions for the Academy Award for Best Foreign Language Film
