= Miloš Radivojević =

Miloš "Miša" Radivojević (Serbian Cyrillic: Милош "Миша" Радивојевић, pronounced [mîloʃ mǐːʃa radivǒːjevitɕ]; born 3 November 1939) is a Serbian retired television and movie director, and a retired professor at the Faculty of Dramatic Arts in Belgrade.

== Biography ==
Miloš was born in 1939 in Čačak, Serbia. He started his higher education as a philosophy student and graduated in 1966 from Faculty of Dramatic Arts in Belgrade in 1966, as one of the first students of Aleksandar Petrović with the medium length film Adam & Eva 66. He worked as assistant director under Puriša Đorđević between 1961 and 1969. He directed 16 feature films, beginning with Bube u glavi ("This Crazy World of Ours") which received the Golden Lion medal at the 1970 film festival. Two films, Čavka and Kvar, have been made based on original screenplays by Svetozar Vlajković. Other prizes include

- Silver Mermaid and Roberto Paolela (Naples, 1975) – Testament
- Bronze Palm (Valencia, 1989) – Čavka
- Lokarno, 1979 - Kvar'

His film Како су ме украли Немци ("How I Was Stolen by the Germans") claims to have used authentic biographical details of the author's childhood, describing how the small boy felt neglected by his communist family whereas getting attention just by a German officer, who occupied some rooms in his family's home during the Second World War.
