= Sven Šestak =

Croatian actor

- Born: 11 March 1974 (age 52); Koprivnica, Croatia
- Occupation: Actor
- Years active: 2000–present

Sven Šestak (born 11 March 1974 in Koprivnica) is a Croatian actor. He is known for his role as Duško in the cult comedy series Zakon! and for his active and critically acclaimed stage career in the Gavella Drama Theatre in Zagreb.

== Biography ==
Sven Šestak was born on 11 March 1974 in Koprivnica, where he finished primary school. In Varaždin, he finished gymnasium. He studied law in Zagreb, until enrolling at the Academy of Dramatic Art, University of Zagreb entrance exam, on his second try in 1993. He graduated in 1999.

In 1997, he starred with Anita Matić Delić and Hana Hegedušić in the critically lauded fifteen-minute Daniel Kušan-directed short film A Sad and Tragic Story, featuring the screenplay by Nebojša Slijepčević. That same year, he provided the voice of the Fox in the animated box-office success Lapitch the Little Shoemaker. His notable film roles include Behind the Glass and Armin.

In television, he is best known for his starring role as the eccentric computer genius Duško in the controversial cult Ivan Goran Vitez comedy series Zakon!, starring alongside Stojan Matavulj, Robert Ugrina and Nenad Cvetko. For the role, he was nominated for a Golden Rose at the Slavonia Television and Theatre Festival. He also did notable supporting roles in the series Naša mala klinika and Najbolje godine.

He is further known for starring in the television series Balkan Inc. as Žuti and Bibin svijet as Martin Fruk, replacing fellow Gavella actor Janko Rakoš in the latter when he left in 2009.

Holding a prominent stage career, Šestak is known for his performances at the Gavella Drama Theatre. He made his debut in a 2000 adaptation of Zlatno tele and became a member of the ensemble in 2002. He starred in the theatre's adaptations of Caligula, La vida es sueño, The Ballads of Petrica Kerempuh, Peer Gynt, Tartuffe, The Three Sisters, A Midsummer Night's Dream, The Eight Commissioner, King Richard the Third, U registraturi, Tesla Anonimus and Dundo Maroje.

In 2012, he was nominated for a Croatian Theatre Award for Outstanding Performance by an Actor in a Leading Role for his performance as Charles Smith in Choices. He won the Ardalion Award and the Apollo Prize at the Novi Sad Culture and Theatre Festival for his role in a 2007 adaptation of The Master and Margarita.

At the Kino Europa Theatre in Koprivnica, Šestak opened the Ludens Theatre. With the Alan Ayckbourn trilogy The Norman Conquests directed by Franko Perković as its professional debut, the Ludens Theatre is the first and only drama theatre in Koprivnica, which actively toured around Croatia and the Balkans at numerous festivals, including the Zagreb-based Gumbek Days and the Golden Laughter Festival.

Šestak is also active as a voice actor in Croatian-language versions of animated feature films. He provided voice work for Bubbles in Finding Nemo, adult Flower in Bambi, Alfredo Linguini in Ratatouille, Al the Alligator in Lady and the Tramp, Lanky Schmidt and George Sanderson in Monsters, Inc., the M.C. Monkey in The Jungle Boo and The Jungle Book 2, Bobble in the Tinker Bell franchise, Preston in Garfield 2 and Lenny Leonard in The Simpsons Movie. He is also the official Croatian voice for Meowth in most Pokémon media and provided the voice of the title character in the Croatian dub of The Spectacular Spider-Man.

In 2013, he was named president of the Cultural Council in Koprivnica, after Ana Tuk. He also worked as volunteer after the 2020 Petrinja earthquake.

== Selected filmography ==
=== Film ===
Year	Title	Role	Notes
1997	Vrlo tužna i tragična priča	Mislav	
1997	Lapitch the Little Shoemaker	The Fox	Voice role
2007	Armin		
2007	Behind the Glass	Nikola Jeren	
