= High potential =

High potential may refer to:

- Intellectual giftedness, an intellectual ability significantly higher than average
- HPI (TV series), a French TV series
  - High Potential, a 2024 American adaptation of the French show
- High Potential Individual Visa, awarded to people at post graduate and above levels wishing to work in the UK

== See also ==
- Electric potential
- High voltage
- Dielectric withstand test, also known as a high potential test
