= Robert Ugrina =

Croatian actor and comedian

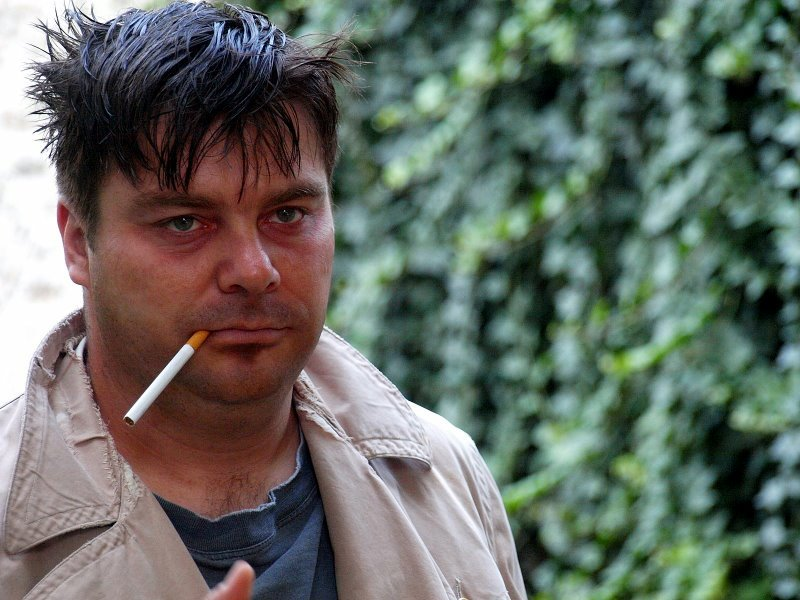
- Born: Robert Ugrina; 1974 (age 51–52); Zagreb, SR Croatia, SFR Yugoslavia
- Citizenship: Croatia
- Occupation: Actor

Robert Ugrina (born 1974 in Zagreb) is a Croatian actor and comedian.

He is best known for his roles in the popular comedy series Bumerang (2005-2006), Zakon! (2009) and Ko te šiša (2016-2020). He has appeared in Sleep Sweet, My Darling, What Is a Man Without a Moustache? (both 2005), Metastases (2009), Josef (2011), Vegetarian Cannibal (2012) and Lavina (2017).

He is also known for an extensive stage and voice-acting career. He has provided voice-work for over a hundred animated feature films and Mr. Krabs in the Croatian-language version of SpongeBob SquarePants.

== Career ==
He graduated from the Academy of Dramatic Arts of the University of Zagreb.

He conceived his successful comedic career on television initially for his role as Drago in Bumerang (2005-2006). After that stint, he appeared as in the memorable supporting role of Medo Bruno on Bitange i princeze.

His perhaps best-known role is the abused sidekick of Inspector Zdravko Maček (played by Stojan Matavulj) Mateo Ćirić in the controversial series Zakon! (2009) by Ivan Goran Vitez. While it was short-lived, the series has now garnered a cult following. From 2016 to 2020, he portrayed Joža, a lazy mechanic and husband of hairdresser Lili (played by Jadranka Đokić) in the commercially successful Aldo Tardozzi comedy Ko te šiša.

He also appeared in Zabranjena ljubav, Naša mala klinika, Bibin svijet, Stipe u gostima and Najbolje godine.

He has worked actively on film, performing as a leading man in Sleep Sweet, My Darling, Otac (both 2005) Metastases (2009) and Lavina (2017) and a character actor in What Is a Man Without a Moustache? (2005), Play Me a Love Song (2007), Will Not End Here (2008), Josef (2011) and Vegetarian Cannibal (2012). Lavina, screened at the 2017 Pula Film Festival, seen Ugrina star in a leading female role and gained him a Golden Arena for Best Supporting Actress nomination.

Ugrina has starred in plays in various theatres in Zagreb, Split, Požega, Varaždin and Virovitica. He has starred in plays including Vjenčani list, Radio Tesla, Brak iz računa and Sve o muškarcima.

== Filmography ==
=== Television ===
TV series
| Year | Title | Role |
|---|---|---|
| 2005 | Zabranjena ljubav | Domagoj Nola |
| 2005 | Odmori se, zaslužio si: Božićni specijal | Security Guard |
| 2005 | Balkan Inc. | Brother II |
| 2005-2006 | Bumerang | Drago |
| 2007 | Bibin svijet | Robi |
| 2007-2008 | Dobre namjere | Inspector |
| 2007-2008 | Bitange i princeze | Medo Brundo |
| 2008 | Zauvijek susjedi | Suhi Ivan |
| 2009 | Stipe u gostima | Žac |
| 2009 | Zakon! | Mateo Ćirić |
| 2010 | Stipe u gostima | Joža |
| 2011 | Najbolje godine | Hotel owner |
| 2011 | Provodi i sprovodi | Briški |
| 2011 | Stipe u gostima | Doorman |
| 2013 | Odmori se, zaslužio si | Crni |
| 2014-2015 | Kud puklo da puklo | Vjeko |
| 2015 | Počivali u miru | Kićo |
| 2015 | Crno-bijeli svijet | Pajzlek |
| 2020 | Dar mar | Petar Brkljača |

=== Film ===
Film
| Year | Title | Role |
|---|---|---|
| 1999 | Sunčana strana subote | |
| 1999 | Četverored | General Herenčić |
| 2000 | Celestial Body | Croatian soldier |
| 2001 | The Miroslav Holding Co. | Collector |
| 2005 | Sleep Sweet, My Darling | Ladović #2 |
| 2005 | What Is a Man Without a Moustache? | Miljenko |
| 2005 | Otac | |
| 2007 | Play Me a Love Song | Godfather |
| 2008 | Will Not End Here | Police officer |
| 2009 | Metastases | Kizo |
| 2011 | Blurs | Tramvajac |
| 2011 | Josef | Berket |
| 2012 | Vegetarian Cannibal | Dr. Soldo |
| 2012 | Zagorski specijalitet | Joža |
| 2012 | Hives | Driver in the bus |
| 2012 | Inspector Martin and the Gang of Snails | Franjo |
| 2024 | The Man Who Could Not Remain Silent (Čovjek koji nije mogao šutjeti) | |

=== Voice-over roles ===
Film
| Year | Title | Role |
|---|---|---|
| 2004 | The SpongeBob SquarePants Movie | Mr. Krabs |
| 2006 | The Wild | Samson |
| 2006 | Ice Age: The Meltdown | Cholly |
| 2006 | Happy Feet | Narrator, Leopard Seal, Trev |
| 2006 | The Ant Bully | Glow Worm |
| 2006 | Arthur and the Invisibles | Prince Darkos |
| 2006 | Hoodwinked! | Dolph |
| 2006 | The Ugly Duckling and Me! | Frank |
| 2006 | Antz | General Mandible |
| 2006 | Barnyard | Ben |
| 2006 | Over the Hedge | Vincent |
| 2007 | Teenage Mutant Ninja Turtles | Michelangelo, Thief, Ship Worker |
| 2007 | Donkey Xote | Sancho Panza |
| 2007 | Shrek the Third | Cyclops |
| 2007 | Ratatouille | Horst |
| 2008 | Horton Hears a Who! | Vlad Vladikoff |
| 2008 | Dragon Hunters | Lord Arnold |
| 2008 | Igor | King Malbert |
| 2008 | The Tale of Despereaux | Gregory |
| 2008 | The Jungle Book 2 | Dizzy |
| 2008 | Madagascar: Escape 2 Africa | Moto Moto |
| 2009 | The Princess and the Frog | James |
| 2009 | Monsters vs. Aliens | General Warren R. Monger |
| 2009 | Up | Gama |
| 2009 | Cloudy with a Chance of Meatballs | Officer Earl |
| 2010 | Marmaduke | Bosco |
| 2010 | Tangled | Hook Hand Thug |
| 2010 | Fantasia 2000 | Penn and Teller |
| 2010 | How to Train Your Dragon | Stoick the Vast |
| 2011 | Cars 2 | Grem |
| 2011 | Rio | Rafael |
| 2011 | The Smurfs | Grouchy Smurf |
| 2011 | Rango | Señor Flan |
| 2011 | Gnomeo and Juliet | Tybalt |
| 2011 | Puss in Boots | Raoul |
| 2012 | Hotel Transylvania | Murray the Mummy |
| 2012 | Rise of the Guardians | Nicolas St. North |
| 2013 | Cloudy with a Chance of Meatballs 2 | Officer Earl |
| 2013 | The Smurfs 2 | Grouchy Smurf |
| 2013 | Planes | Chug |
| 2014 | Planes: Fire and Rescue | Chug |
| 2014 | How to Train Your Dragon 2 | Stoick the Vast |
| 2014 | The Boxtrolls | Mr. Gristle |
| 2014 | Rio 2 | Rafael |
| 2015 | Hotel Transylvania 2 | Murray the Mummy |
| 2015 | Minions | Walter Nelson Jr. |
| 2015 | Mune: Guardian of the Moon | Mox |
| 2016 | The Angry Birds Movie | Judge Peckinpah |
| 2016 | Sing | Bears |
| 2016 | The Jungle Book | Dizzy |
| 2018 | Hotel Transylvania 3 | Murray the Mummy |
| 2019 | How to Train Your Dragon: The Hidden World | Stoick the Vast |
| 2019 | Playmobil: The Movie | Ook Ook, Sven, Seadog |
| 2020 | Dolittle | King Rassouli |
| 2021 | Sing 2 | Clay Calloway |
| 2022 | Puss in Boots: The Last Wish | Papa Bear |
