= Matavulj =

Matavulj is a South Slavic surname. Notable people with the name include:

- Simo Matavulj (1852–1908), Serbian writer and translator
- Stojan Matavulj (born 1961), Croatian actor
