= IQ 160 =

- Genre: Crime drama; Comedy drama
- Based on: HPI by: Nicolas Jean; Stéphane Carrié; Alice Chegaray-Breugnot
- Starring: Dajana Čuljak; Luka Peroš; Ivan Molnar; Dea Presečki
- Country of origin: Croatia
- Original language: Croatian
- No. of seasons: 1
- No. of episodes: 8

Production
- Running time: 45 minutes

Original release
- Network: Voyo
- Release: 24 July 2026 – present

Related
- HPI; High Potential

IQ 160 is a Croatian crime comedy drama television series based on the 2021 Franco-Belgian television series HPI. The series stars Dajana Čuljak as Marina Kapov, a gifted woman that helps Zagreb police solve local crime. It premiered on 24 July 2026 on Voyo.

== Premise ==
Marina Kapov is a cleaner at a Zagreb police station and a single mother of three. Although she hides her exceptionally high IQ of 160, her talent becomes impossible to ignore after she accidentally solves a complex case that seasoned detectives failed to crack. Recognizing her abilities, the police hire her as a consultant, pairing her with inspector Tomislav Ramljak, a strict, rule‑bound investigator. Their contrasting personalities gradually turn into a strength as they work together to solve challenging crimes.

== Cast and characters ==
- Dajana Čuljak as Marina Kapov
- Luka Peroš as Tomislav Ramljak
- Marina Redžepović as Sanja Petrov
- Ivan Molnar as Filip Antić, a young detective
- Dea Presečki as Maja Šipek, an IT specialist
- Glorija Pinturić as Dora, Marina's eldest daughter
- Stjepan Perić as Marko Tafra, Marina's ex-husband
- Živa Božić as Stela
- Jan Crnković as Luka

== Episodes ==
No.	Title	Original release date
1	"Episode 1"	24 July 2026
Marina Kapov, a cleaner at the Zagreb police station, assists in the investigation into the death of Ana Tokić’s husband.
2	"Episode 2"	24 July 2026
Marina officially begins working as a consultant in the police team and joins the investigation into the death of Marko Katić, initially treated as a suicide.
3	"Episode 3"	31 July 2026
The investigation into the disappearance of Mia and Tea begins after the murder of their father.
4	"Episode 4"	7 August 2026
The death of a veterinarian Fani Alavanja is initially treated as natural, but evidence suggests she had been illegally selling exotic animals obtained through her veterinary work. The investigation reviews her personal connections and past events that may clarify the circumstances of her death.
5	"Episode 5"	14 August 2026
The attempted murder of Emil Kajić leads investigators to evidence showing that he was targeted so his heart could be used in a transplant for a young boy.
6	"Episode 6"	21 August 2026
The murder of Jurica Vinković leads investigators through incidents of football‑related conflicts.
7	"Episode 7"	28 August 2026
The murder of Martin Mamić sparks an investigation at a rowing club, where Marina and detective Ramljak uncover old conflicts, threats, and past trauma. As clues point to Goran and Romana Spajić, their memories and testimonies appear to be part of a larger manipulation.
8	"Episode 8"	4 September 2026
Young ice skater Lidija Viculin is found run over by her own car, linking her death to the earlier murder of Nikola Zaninović.

== Production and release ==
RTL announced the series on 22 June 2026. It premiered on the network's streaming service Voyo on 24 July 2026 as the first Croatian Voyo original. The police station set seen in the series was constructed inside the Vjesnik building in Zagreb. Filming concluded two weeks before the building was heavily damaged in a fire in November 2025 and subsequently demolished in June 2026, making the production the final instance of a Croatian television set being housed in the structure.
