= Dajana Čuljak =

Croatian actress

- Born: 1991 (age 34–35); Pleternica
- Occupation: Actress
- Years active: 2014–present
- Television: Sjene prošlosti; IQ 160

Dajana Čuljak is a Croatian actress. She is most known for portraying Paula Lončar in RTL's drama television series Sjene prošlosti (2024–2025).

== Biography ==
Dajana Čuljak was born in 1991 in Pleternica. She graduated from the Academy of Dramatic Art at the University of Zagreb.

From 2015 to 2017, she appeared in HRT's teen comedy series Nemoj nikome reći. In 2024, she appeared on Oblak u službi zakona. From 2024 to 2025, she was a principal cast member on the drama television series Sjene prošlosti; she portrayed Paula Lončar. In 2026, Čuljak was cast as Marina Kapov in Voyo's original series IQ 160, which is based on the 2021 Franco-Belgian television series HPI.
