= Sjene prošlosti =

- The title card for the series
- Genre: drama
- Created by: Kerem Çatay
- Based on: Ufak Tefek Cinayetler by Meriç Acemi
- Written by: Ozren Marod; Nikolina Čuljak; Aleksandar Kristek; Marjan Alčevski
- Directed by: Goran Rukavina; Kristijan Milić; Ivan Pavličić; Stanislav Tomić; Rahela Jagrić Pirc
- Starring: Marina Fernandez; Jelena Perčin; Dajana Čuljak; Ana Maras
- Composer: Cem Ali Öget
- Country of origin: Croatia
- Original language: Croatian
- No. of seasons: 2
- No. of episodes: 217

Production
- Executive producers: Iva Graghor; Danijel Ivoš
- Running time: 45 minutes

Original release
- Network: RTL
- Release: 2 September 2024 – 30 October 2025

Sjene prošlosti (English: Shadows of the Past) is a Croatian drama television series that premiered on 2 September 2024 on RTL. The final episode of the first season aired on 23 May 2025. The second season premiered on 1 September 2025, and the series concluded on 30 October 2025.

The series is a Croatian remake of the 2017 Turkish series Ufak Tefek Cinayetler, which previously aired in Croatia under the title Osveta u štiklama (English: Revenge in Heels) on Pickbox TV.

== Premise ==
The series centers on four women: Marta, Paula, Ana and Olga, who were best friends in high school. However, when Marta decided to dethrone Olga from the throne of popularity, she prepared a cruel prank for her which leads to their friendship falling apart, changing Olga's life forever.

Twenty years later, Olga returns to their lives and the paths of four former friends are intertwined again. Although Olga wants to continue a normal life, faced with her old friends and enemies, a desire for revenge awakens in her, which will trigger an avalanche of various, very unexpected events, and even murder.

== Cast ==
- Marina Fernandez as Olga Vidović, a gynecologist
- Jelena Perčin as Marta Novak
- Dajana Čuljak as Paula Lončar
- Ana Maras as Ana Kolarić
- Jasmin Mekić as Šimun Novak, Marta's husband
- Matija Kačan as Tomo Lončar, Paula's husband
- Janko Rakoš as Mate Kolarić, Ana's husband
- Đorđe Kukuljica as professor Eduard
- Tena Nemet Brankov as detective Darija Vukoja
- Andrej Dojkic as detective Kruno Rimac
- Nada Gačešić-Livaković as a professor
- Arija Rizvić as Blanka Kos
- Lily Antić as Nika Kolarić, Ana's daughter
- Andrija Balović as Borna Kolarić, Ana's son
- Ezra Mošet as Noa Lončar, Paula's son
- Marla Ibrahimpašić as Mila Novak, Marta's daughter

== Series overview ==
Season	Episodes	Originally released	
Season	Episodes	First released	Last released
1	177	2 September 2024	23 May 2025
2	40	1 September 2025	30 October 2025

== Production ==
RTL announced the series and its main cast on 23 July 2024. The filming took place at the Jadran film studios in Zagreb.

In May 2025, the series was renewed for a second season. It premiered on 1 September 2025.

== Reception ==
According to Google, Sjene prošlosti was the most googled television series in Croatia in 2024.

=== Accolades ===
Year	Award	Category	Recipient(s)	Result	Ref.
2025	Golden Studio	TV Series of the Year	Sjene prošlosti	Nominated	
2025	Večernjak's Rose	Actress of the Year	Jelena Perčin	Nominated	
