= Hana Hegedušić =

Croatian actress

- Born: 29 January 1976 (age 50); Zagreb, SR Croatia, SFR Yugoslavia
- Occupation: Actress
- Years active: 1997-present

Hana Hegedušić (born 29 January 1976) is a Croatian actress. She appeared in more than twenty films since 1997.

== Selected filmography ==
Film
Year	Title	Role	Notes
2002	God Forbid a Worse Thing Should Happen		
2007	Play Me a Love Song		
2010	Forest Creatures	Vesna	
2011	Josef		

TV
Year	Title	Role	Notes
2007–2008	Ne daj se, Nina	Martina Spisić	

== Voice-over roles ==
Film
Year	Title	Role	Notes
2010	Marmaduke	Mazie	
2011	Alvin and the Chipmunks: Chipwrecked	Zoe	
