= Dundo Maroje =

Comedy by Croatian playwright Martin Drzic

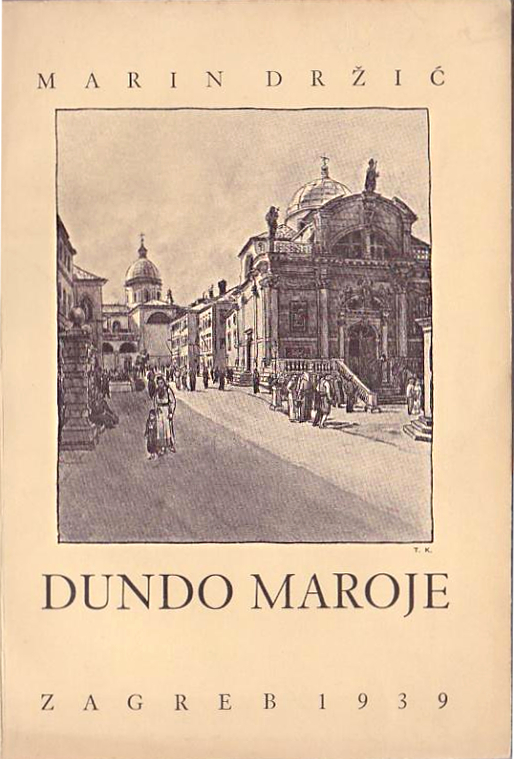
Dundo Maroje published in Zagreb, 1939

Dundo Maroje (Uncle Maroje) is a comedy by Croatian playwright Marin Držić. Dealing with the misunderstandings between the older and newer generations during the Renaissance, the comedy is considered a staple in Croatian theatre, and one of the greatest Croatian-language literary works.

== Background ==
It is said to have been first performed in 1551 in the main hall of the Grand Council of the Republic of Ragusa by the company Pomet. Taking place in Rome with characters from Dubrovnik, the play consists of two prologues and five acts, from which the ending did not survive.

== Critical plaudits ==
George Thomas, a professor at McMaster University wrote that it is the author's "best-known work" and "the most enduring work in the history of Croatian drama". Renato Kragić of Slobodna Dalmacija describes Dundo Maroje as "among the top of dramatic literature in Croatian" and that "should be in the pantheon of European Renaissance literature" Ante Kadić wrote in Slavic Review about Dundo Maroje being Držić's main work. (need detail inside this book)

== Notable adaptations and presentations ==
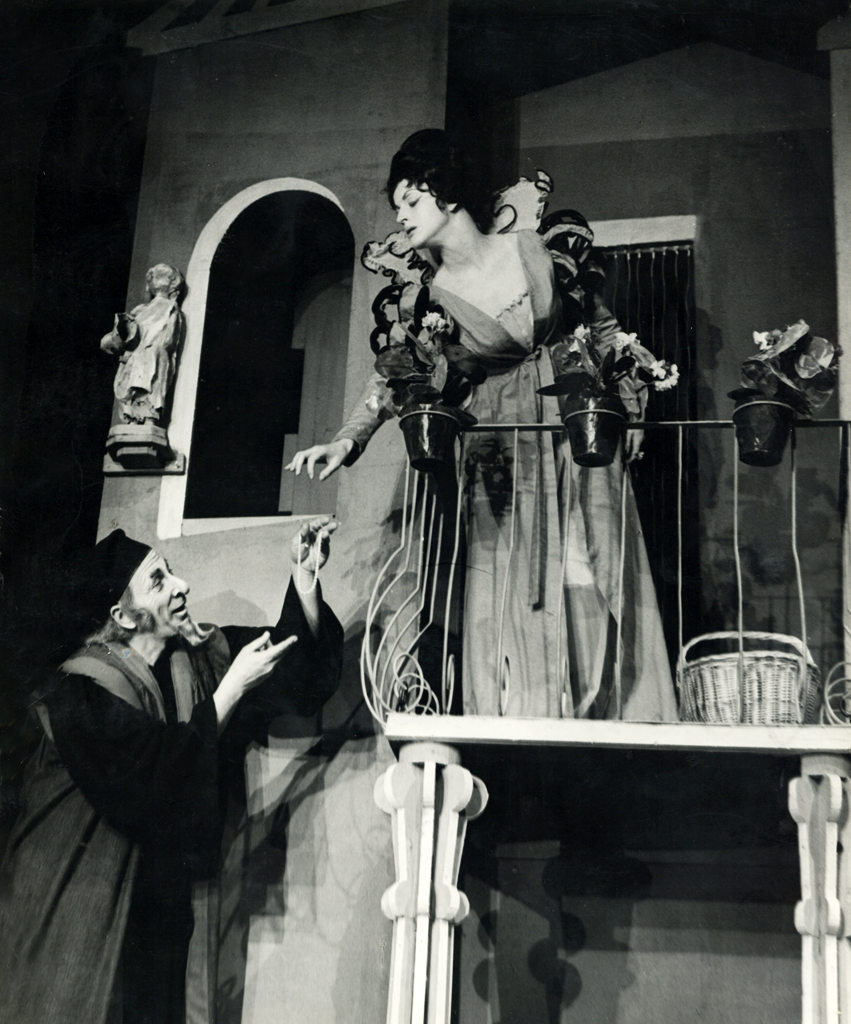
The play by the Maribor Slovene National Theatre in 1964

In 2008, International Federation of Library Associations and Institutions (IFLA) reported that Dundo Maroje had been translated to 18 languages.

In 2011, the Gavella Drama Theatre presented its version of Dundo Maroje. It was directed by Marco Sciaccaluga and starred Žarko Savić, Amar Bukvić, Ozren Grabarić, Živko Anočić, Franjo Dijak, Sven Medvešek, Zoran Gogić and Sven Šestak.

In March 2018, Filip Krenus and a group of actors did a reading of the play as translated by his team in English at Conway Hall in London for the 450th anniversary of Držić's death. In November 2018, an English-translated performance of the play took place at the European Parliament in Brussels.
