= Případy mimořádné Marty =

- Genre: Crime comedy
- Written by: Zdeněk Jecelín; Václav Hašek; Josef Kokta
- Directed by: Marek Najbrt; Tomáš Pavlíček
- Starring: Tatiana Dyková
- Country of origin: Czech Republic
- Original language: Czech
- No. of seasons: 2
- No. of episodes: 16

Production
- Running time: 49-60 minutes
- Production company: Evolution Films

Original release
- Network: Voyo
- Release: 23 October 2022

Related
- HPI; High Potential

Případy mimořádné Marty (Cases of the Extraordinary Marta) is a Czech crime comedy series broadcast on TV Nova since 23 October 2022 and directed by Marek Najbrt and Tomáš Pavlíček. The screenplay was written by Zdeněk Jecelín, Václav Hašek and Josef Kokta.

Tatiana Dyková, Roman Zach, Jiří Svoboda, Anita Krausová, Jana Plodková, Táňa Malíková, Jan Novotný, Matěj Hádek, Hana Seidlová, Petr Polák, Andrej Polák and others appear in main roles of the series.

The series was originally supposed to premiere on TV Nova on 30 October 2022. However, on 7 October 2022, it was announced that the television premiere would be postponed to the first half of 2023. On 31 March 2023 the date of the premiere was specified as 30 April 2023.

As of 23 October 2022, the series is only available to Voyo subscribers, where one episode per week has been published.

On 15 November 2023, TV Nova announced that the series was renewed for season 2.

== Plot ==
The plot of the series, based on a French-Belgian original, HPI, has the extraordinary Marta Adamcová (Tatiana Dyková) as its protagonist. An incredibly intelligent and unique woman. Even though Marta doesn't want anything to do with the police, she accepts an offer from the police chief to join her homicide team as a consultant. She is assigned to the aloof and order-loving Adam Kreiner (Roman Zach), and together with him, she begins to solve complicated murder cases with her own personality. In exchange for her help, she asks the police to help her investigate an old case of the disappearance of her boyfriend Roman (Jakub Gottwald). Her daughter's father disappeared into the unknown, fifteen long years ago. However, Marta's connection with the police department will not be easy, because few people can stand her.

== Cast ==
- Tatiana Dyková as Marta Adamcová
- Roman Zach as kpt. Mgr. Adam Kreiner
- Jiří Svoboda as kpt. Mgr. Filip Vlasák
- Anita Krausová as mjr. Mgr. Klára Hořavová
- Jana Plodková as mjr. Mgr. Fišerová, (since season 2)
- Táňa Malíková as Dana Štovíčková
- Jan Novotný as Hynek Svoboda, neighbor
- Matyáš Pekárek as Eliáš Adamec
- Barbora Marková as Kristýna Adamcová
- Matěj Hádek as Libor Adamec
- Jakub Gottwald as Roman Dlouhý
- Hana Seidlová as Helena Jeřábková
- Petr Polák as Štěpán Kreiner
- Andrej Polák as doctor MUDr. Jan Berger
