= Zakon! =

Croatian television series

Zakon! is a Croatian sitcom, produced by Interfilm and originally aired in 2009 by Croatian Radiotelevision, a satirical comedy about police business in a fictional Croatian backcountry with elements of the absurd, combined with references to real life. Because of its numerous references to real people that were deemed to be too offensive, several episodes were edited to have certain plot elements visually censored, despite the fact the original script was accepted as such at a public tender.

== Cast and crew ==
- Director: Ivan Goran Vitez
- Screenwriters: Tonči Kožul, Zoran Lazić
- Actors:
  - Stojan Matavulj as Zdravko Maček
  - Robert Ugrina as Mateo Ćirić
  - Nenad Cvetko as Zvonimir Krmpotić
  - Sven Šestak as Duško
  - Ines Bojanić as Rajna
  - Angel Palašev as Mayor Slavko
  - Ivica Pucar as Denis Miloglav
  - Luka Peroš as Brother Teofil
