= Luka Peroš =

Croatian actor (born 1976)

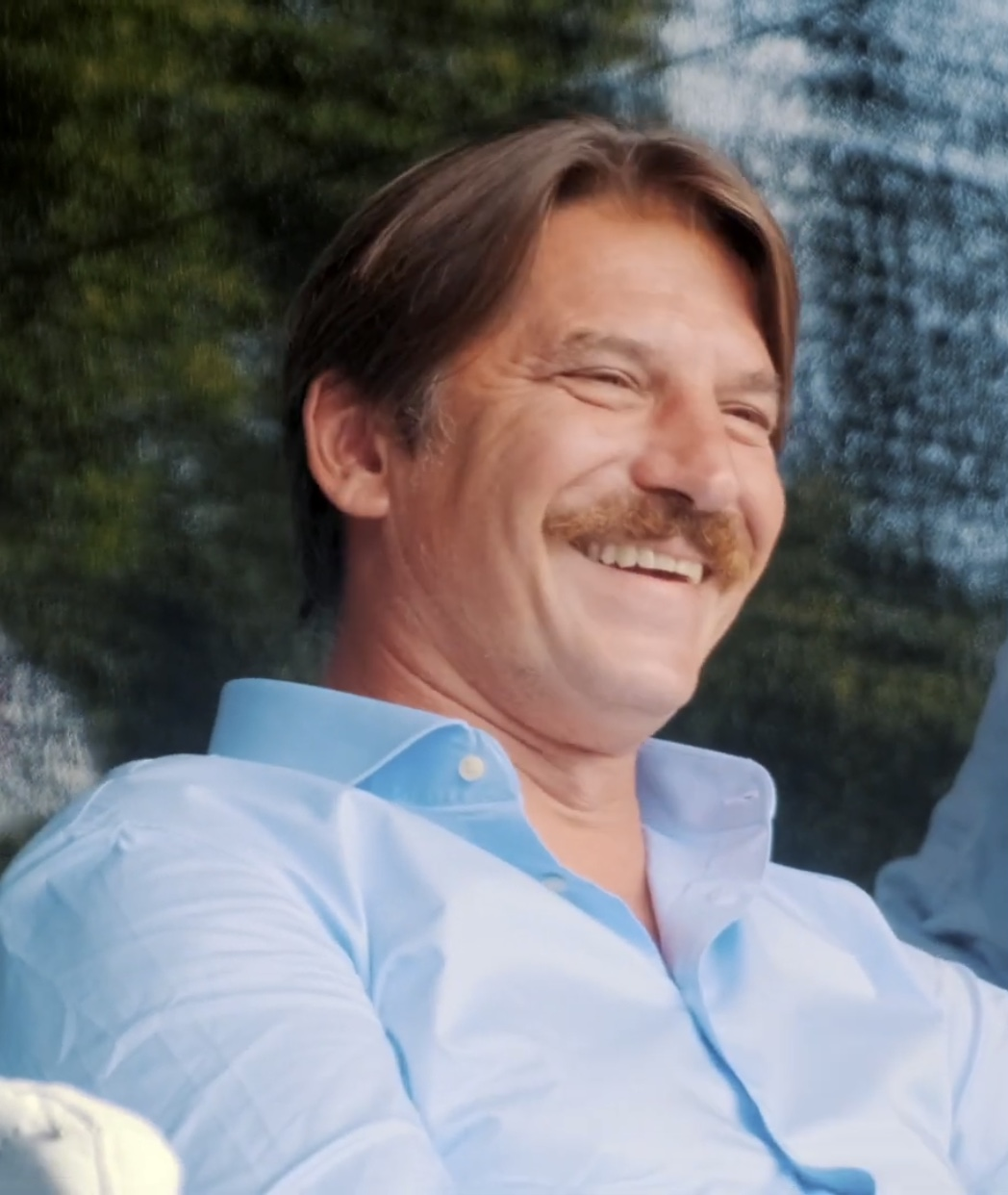
- Peroš at the 2021 German Comic Con Limited Edition
- Born: 28 October 1976 (age 49); Zagreb, SR Croatia, Yugoslavia
- Occupation: Actor
- Years active: 1995–present

Luka Peroš (born 28 October 1976) is a Croatian actor best known for the role of Marseille in Money Heist.

Peroš is a polyglot, being able to speak eight different languages fluently.

== Early life ==
Peroš graduated from the American Community School of Abu Dhabi in 1995.

== Filmography ==
- The Three Men of Melita Žganjer (1998) as Americki vojnik
- Kanjon opasnih igara (1998) as Zlatan
- Četverored (1999)
- La Femme Musketeer (2004, TV Mini-Series) as Funeral Musketeer
- Zabranjena ljubav (2006, TV Series) as Adrijan Tomas
- The Hunting Party (2007) as Commando #1
- Bitange i princeze (2008, TV Series) as Strazar
- Will Not End Here (2008) as Vojvoda
- Niciji sin (2008) as Policajac
- Zakon! (2009, TV Series) as Brat Teofil
- Max Schmeling (2010) as Referee Smith / Journalist #2
- Forest Creatures (2010) as Mladen
- BloodRayne: The Third Reich (2011) as Boris
- Blubberella (2011) as Boris
- Larin izbor (2012, TV Series) as Crni
- Larin izbor: Izgubljeni princ (2012) as Crni
- Tasting Menu (2013) as Louis
- Panzer Chocolate (2013) as Peter (Policeman)
- Number 55 (2014) as Franjo
- El Niño (2014) as Murat
- Steppeulven (2014)
- Borgia (2014, TV Series) as Imola Man
- Mar de plástico (2015, TV Series) as Eric
- Kud puklo da puklo (2015, TV Series) as Recepcioner
- Mine (2016) as Delta Force #1
- Wasn't Afraid to Die (2016) as Austrian arms dealer
- Megan Leavey (2017) as Drunk Guy in Bar
- Papillon (2017) as Santini
- The Tree of Blood (2018) as Dimitri
- The Photographer of Mauthausen (2018) as Schulz
- Intrigo: Dear Agnes (2019) as Client
- While at War (2019) as Bernhardt
- Los Rodríguez y el más allá (2019) as Raúl
- Money Heist (also known as La Casa de Papel) (2019-2021, TV Series) as Jakov / Marseille
- Black Beach (2020) as Negociador (Leo Babich)
- El arte de volver (2021)
- Mehmed: Fetihler Sultanı (2024, TV series) as Giovanni Giustiniani
- IQ 160 (2026, TV series) as Tomislav Ramljak
