= Vinko Kraljević =

Croatian actor (born 1952)

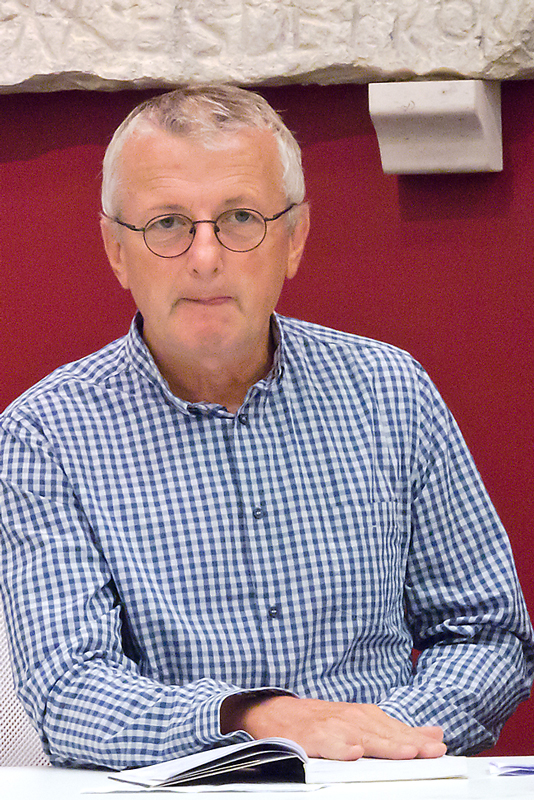
- Born: 16 March 1952 (age 74); Duboko Mokro, PR Bosnia and Herzegovina, FPR Yugoslavia
- Occupation: Actor
- Years active: 1976-present

Vinko Kraljević (born 16 March 1952) is a Croatian actor. He appeared in more than fifty films since 1976.

== Selected filmography ==
Film
Year	Title	Role	Notes
2016	On the Other Side		
2013	A Stranger		
2010	Forest Creatures		
1979	The Return		
