= Play Me a Love Song =

- Directed by: Goran Kulenović
- Written by: Goran Kulenović
- Starring: Ivan Herceg
- Cinematography: Mario Sablic
- Edited by: Slaven Jekauc
- Release date: 15 July 2007 (Pula Film Festival)
- Running time: 106 minutes
- Country: Croatia
- Language: Croatian

Play Me a Love Song (Croatian: Pjevajte nešto ljubavno) is a Croatian comedy film directed by Goran Kulenović. It was released in 2007.

== Cast ==
- Ivan Herceg - Struja
- Ivan Đuričić - Mario
- Ivan Glowatzky - Deni
- Hrvoje Kečkeš - Zlajfa
- Enes Vejzović - Sinisa
- Olga Pakalović - Anja
- Žarko Potočnjak - Strujin stari
- Helena Buljan - Strujina mama
- Damir Lončar - Božo
- Ksenija Marinković - Emica
- Robert Ugrina - Kum
- Hana Hegedušić - Djurdjica
- Stojan Matavulj - Ante
- Biserka Ipša - Andjela
- Zdenka Heršak - Gospodja Hrnjak
- Josip Marotti - Gospodin Hrnjak
