= Forest Creatures =

2010 film

- Film poster
- Croatian: Šuma summarum
- Directed by: Ivan-Goran Vitez
- Starring: Vili Matula; Hana Hegedusic
- Edited by: Mato Ilijić
- Music by: Hrvoje Štefotić
- Release dates: 20 July 2010 (PFF); 19 November 2010 (Croatia)
- Running time: 120 minutes
- Country: Croatia
- Language: Croatian

Forest Creatures (Croatian: Šuma summarum) is a 2010 Croatian black comedy film directed by Ivan-Goran Vitez.

== Cast ==
- Vili Matula as Branko Dvornik
- Hana Hegedušić as Vesna
- Željko Konigsknecht as Sanjin
- Nataša Dangubić as Maja
- Jakša Borić as Rinus
- Marko Makovičić as Edi
- Vinko Kraljević as Siniša
- Ljubiša Savanović - Nedim
- Sanja Hrenar - Nikolina
- Luka Peroš - Mladen
