= The Return (1979 film) =

The Return (Povratak) is a 1979 Croatian film directed by Antun Vrdoljak, starring Boris Dvornik, Fabijan Šovagović and Rade Šerbedžija.

== Cast ==
- Boris Dvornik - Barba Frane
- Fabijan Šovagović - Barba Pave
- Rade Šerbedžija - Police commander (Zandarski narednik)
- Boris Buzančić - Sjor Berto
- Milena Dravić - Roza
- Dušica Žegarac - Marija, Franina zena
- Vinko Kraljević - Stipica
- Matko Raguz - Grispe
- Renata Jurkovic - Ljuba, mlada partizanka
- Dragan Despot - Niko
- Ante Vican - Policajac
