= Renato Baretić =

Croatian writer (1963–2025)

Renato Baretić (12 April 1963 – 1 July 2025) was a Croatian journalist, writer, screenwriter and actor.

== Life and career ==
Baretić was born on 12 April 1963 in Zagreb. In 1983, he began working as a journalist and wrote for numerous Croatian newspapers and magazines. He was a co-writer of the TV series New Age, and a compiler of questions for TV quizzes. Together with Ivica Ivanišević, Ante Tomić, Jurica Pavičić and Alem Ćurin, he started the cultural magazine Torpedo.

He wrote a number of novels, including The Eighth Commissioner (later adapted into a film of the same name), he received numerous literary awards.

Baretić died in Split on 1 July 2025, at the age of 62.
