= Honey Bunny (film) =

2026 Croatian drama film

- Promotional poster
- Croatian: Koke
- Directed by: Igor Jelinović
- Screenplay by: Igor Jelinović
- Produced by: Rea Rajčić
- Starring: Snježana Sinovčić Šiškov; Leon Lučev; Aleksandra Janković; Stojan Matavulj; Ana Marija Veselčić
- Cinematography: Marko Jerbić
- Edited by: Tomislav Stojanović
- Music by: Ana Kovačević; Miro Manojlović
- Production companies: Eclectica; Film House Bas Celik
- Distributed by: Kino Mediteran
- Release dates: 30 January 2026 (IFFR); 11 July 2026 (Pula Film Festival)
- Running time: 97 minutes
- Countries: Croatia; Serbia
- Language: Croatian
- Budget: €550,000

Honey Bunny (Croatian: Koke) is a 2026 drama film written, and directed by Igor Jelinović in his debut feature. A co-production between Croatia and Serbia the film follows a battle that brews between middle-aged sisters over ownership of a holiday home on the Croatian island of Hvar in the Adriatic Sea.

The film had its world premiere at the 55th International Film Festival Rotterdam in Bright Future on 30 January 2026.

== Summary ==
Tonina, lovingly called Koke, has always felt it was her duty to look after her whole family and her sister’s family too. She believes that without her, everything would fall apart. She keeps giving her time, energy, and care, even when things are difficult, but she feels her family doesn’t appreciate her the way she hopes. Quietly, she decides to put the house on Hvar in her own name because she thinks she has earned it. But when her plan becomes known, the family gathering explodes: old hurts, hidden frustrations, and long-ignored problems all come out, ending in a big confrontation.

== Cast ==
- Snježana Sinovčić Šiškov as Tonina
- Leon Lučev as Milan
- Aleksandra Janković as Tajana
- Stojan Matavulj as Bartul
- Ana Marija Veselčić as Tana
- Mare Rodin as Linda
- Simon Situm as Ivan
- Dara Vukic as Nona

== Production ==
The project began with a screenwriting workshop led by Romanian screenwriter Răzvan Rădulescu in 2018, and in the same year it joined the First Films First programme of the Goethe-Institut.

During its development, it achieved significant successes, including the GoEast Award for Best Pitch at 16th Sofia Meetings 2019 of Sofia International Film Festival, as well as the Avanpost Pitch Packaging Award and in-kind services worth up to €15,000, and the MIDPOINT Consulting Award providing script consultancy in two online session at 22nd edition of the Connecting Cottbus East-West Co-production Market in November 2020.

Principal photography began on 22 February 2024 and took place in Zagreb, Split, and on the island of Hvar. It ended in March 2024, after filming for 25 shooting days.

== Release ==
Honey Bunny had its world premiere at the 55th International Film Festival Rotterdam on 30 January 2026, in Bright Future section.

Subsequently, the film was screened at the South East European Film Festival in LA on 5 May 2026.

The film had its Croatian premiere on 11 July 2026 at the Pula Film Festival.

It held its premiere at the 32nd Sarajevo Film Festival on 17 August 2026, screening in the Open Air Premiere and vied for Prix Cineplexx Award.

It was released on 23 July 2026 in Croatian cinemas by Kino Mediteran.

== Reception ==
Writing for Cineuropa, Vladan Petkovic praised Igor Jelinović's direction, describing his approach as "rock-solid" and consistently executed. He highlighted Marko Jerbić's restrained cinematography, noting its frequent use of distant framing, slow camera movements, and compositions. Petkovic also commended the musical score by Miro Manojlović and Ana Kovačić, and Tomislav Stojanović's editing. According to Petkovic, the film's universal appeal comes from both its subject matter and the collaboration between the director and the cast, particularly through their expressive "body language and facial performances."

== Accolades ==
Award	Date of ceremony	Category	Recipient(s)	Result	Ref
Pula Film Festival	16 July 2026	Big Golden Arena for Best Film	Honey Bunny	Won	
Pula Film Festival	16 July 2026	Golden Arena for Best Screenplay	Igor Jelinović	Won	
Pula Film Festival	16 July 2026	Golden Arena for Best Actress	Snježana Sinovčić Šiškov	Won	
Pula Film Festival	16 July 2026	Golden Arena for Best Supporting Actress	Aleksandra Janković	Won	
