= Josef (film) =

- Directed by: Stanislav Tomić
- Written by: Mario Marko Krce
- Produced by: Jozo Patljak
- Starring: Neven Aljinović Tot; Alen Liverić; Dražen Šivak; Sandra Lončarić
- Music by: Marko Perković
- Distributed by: Alka Film
- Release dates: 23 July 2011 (Pula, Croatia)
- Running time: 90 minutes
- Country: Croatia
- Languages: Croatian, German, Russian, Ukrainian
- Budget: 1,000,000 Croatian kuna (c. 150,000 USD)

Josef is a 2011 Croatian war drama film directed by Stanislav Tomić depicting the war story of an Austrian-Hungarian Croat soldier during World War I in 1915 in Galicia. In the film, stress is given to effective photos, music, violence and sex.

Critics were very positive. Critics especially praised costumes and scenography, even though film was produced with low budget and in an independent production. The film won the Golden Arena for Best Special Effects at the 2011 Pula Film Festival.

== Plot ==
In 1915, during World War I in Galicia, Croatian soldiers serving in the Austro-Hungarian Army were sent on The Eastern Front to fight against the Russian Army and Circassian bandits. A soldier who has survived the battle, an unnamed Croat, takes a uniform and identification tag from a dead NCO. Later, the Croat and a group of Croatian Home Guard and Hungarian Honvéd deserters are captured by a Gendarmerie unit led by Lieutenant Ali Tiffenbach. Before the Croat could be executed by firing squad with the rest of the deserters, he is mistaken for Zugsführer Josef, the dead NCO whose identification tag he's carrying. The Austrian Colonel decides to spare the Croat because Josef is well known as a regimental fencing champion, much to the disappointment of Lieutenant Tiffenbach, who suspects that the Croat is an impostor. Tiffenbach later confirms his suspicions when he easily defeats "Josef" in a sword duel.

Later, Tiffenbach's unit is attacked and obliterated by a group of Circassian irregulars led by a Russian officer, Captain Seryoza. The Croat hides the severely wounded Tiffenbach in a shack and switches their uniforms, believing the bandits would spare him if he is dressed like an officer. However, the bandits kill the Croat the moment they see him. Tiffenbach, now wearing Josef's uniform and identification tag, is later found by a woman named Pelagija, who takes him to her cabin in the woods. Pelagija tends to Tiffebach's wounds for a few days, but later betrays him to the Circassians in exchange for a horse.

Over the next few days, Tiffenbach and two other captured soldiers are physically tortured and forced to do heavy work in the Circassian camp. The Circassians later regroup with the regular Russian Army and Tiffenbach is thrown in a prison where he is left to starve. Soon, the Austro-Hungarian Army begins an offensive in the area, defeating the Russians and capturing their positions. Before the end of the battle, Captain Seryoza finds Tiffenbach and switches their uniforms, joining the Austrians. After the battle, the Austrians execute their prisoners, including Tiffenbach who is only half-conscious and unable to identify himself. Seryoza joins the Austrians as they return to their camp and takes a look at Josef's tag to see the name Josip Broz, implying that he would one day become Josip Broz Tito, the future leader of the Yugoslav Partisans and the Socialist Federal Republic of Yugoslavia.

== Roles ==
=== Major roles ===
Actor	Role
Neven Aljinović Tot	An unnamed Croatian soldier, the first Josef impostor
Alen Liverić	Lieutenant Ali Tiffenbach, the second Josef impostor
Dražen Šivak	Captain Seryoza, the third Josef impostor
Sandra Lončarić	Pelagija

=== Supporting roles ===
Actor
Božidarka Frajt
Ivo Gregurević
Bojan Navojec
Igor Hamer
Robert Ugrina
Hana Hegedušić
Tvrtko Jurić
Zorana Rajić
Dieter Schaad
Filip Šovagović
Milan Štrljić
Vid Balog
Draško Zidar
Viktor Goltz
Božidarka Freit
Anne Lise Maxiant
Marko Perković
Zorana Rajić
Nino Sorić
Tvrtko Jurić
Filip Pobran
Miroslav Bohin Isus
Antonio Farkaš
Šime Zanze
Tatjana Kandrač
Vanja Stojković
