= Marina Fernandez (actress) =

Croatian actress

- Born: Marina Vučić; 19 June 1981 (age 44); Split, SR Croatia, SFR Yugoslavia
- Occupation: Actress

Marina Fernandez (née Vučić; born 19 June 1981) is a Croatian actress.

== Biography ==
Marina was born in Split, Croatia. She went to university until 2000 in Split where she finished business school as a department sales managers.

== Filmography ==
- Ruža vjetrova as Marija Matić Mrčela (2012–2013)
- Sjene prošlosti as Olga Vidović (2024)
