= Bitange i princeze =

- Created by: Goran Kulenović
- Based on: Friends by: David Crane; Marta Kauffman
- Written by: Vinko Brešan; Ivan Goran Vitez
- Screenplay by: Goran Kulenović
- Directed by: Goran Kulenović
- Starring: Mila Elegović; Tarik Filipović; Rene Bitorajac; Hrvoje Kečkeš; Nataša Dangubić
- Opening theme: "Bitange i princeze" by Hladno pivo
- Country of origin: Croatia
- Original language: Croatian
- No. of seasons: 5
- No. of episodes: 108 (list of episodes)

Production
- Editors: Slaven Jekauc; Ante Storić
- Running time: 30 minutes
- Production company: Interfilm

Original release
- Network: HRT 1 / HRT 2
- Release: 15 April 2005 – 8 March 2010

Bitange i princeze (English: Bums and Princesses) is a Croatian sitcom television series. Produced by Interflim for HRT, the series aired from 15 April 2005 to 8 March 2010 on HRT 1 and HRT 2. It was created and directed by Goran Kulenović.

Set in Zagreb and loosely based on the premise of Friends, the series stars an ensemble cast that portrays five young adult friends living in two neighboring apartments: Robi (Rene Bitorajac), Kazo (Hrvoje Kečkeš), and Teo (Tarik Filipović) live opposite of Irena (Mila Elegović) and Lucija (Nataša Dangubić). Recurring characters include Gazda (Predrag Vušović), Armando (Dražen Čuček), and Saša (Mile Kekin).

Since the series concluded with its fifth season in 2010, it continued enjoying high popularity years after its release, and is often described as "the Croatian Friends." In 2021, the entire series was officially remastered and rereleased by Interflim on YouTube.

== Premise ==
Robert "Robi" Kumerle found a perfect new apartment for himself in Zagreb, but when he realizes he cannot afford it on his own, he invites Kazimir "Kazo", a man he just met in a pub and who happened to have moved out of his mother's apartment, to be his roommate. The issues arise when Irena Grobnik also attempts to move in the same apartment and share rent expenses with Lucija Toč, a girl she also just met at the video rental shop. Robi invites Kazo's friend Teodor "Teo," whose wife just evicted him out of their place, to join him and Kazo as a roommate; the boys ultimately end up getting the apartment, whereas the girls move into a neighboring one. Despite their differences in character and lifestyle, the five quickly form a friend group.

The group usually hangs out in a local pub called "Bitange i Princeze," where they are waited on by Armando, a feminine man who always flirts with Robi, but gets rejected due to Robi's disgust of homosexuality. Another prominent location is a video rental shop, owned by an older man everyone refers to as Gazda ("The Boss"), where Lucija works at the beginning of the series, and is later joined by Kazo, whom Gazda employs due to his extensive film knowledge.

== Cast ==
=== Main cast ===
- Mila Elegović as Irena Grobnik, a former model. Although she comes across as a vain blonde with no interests beyond beauty, fashion, gossip, and horoscope, Irena is quick-witted, overly sarcastic, and has no issue "telling it like is" and delivering insults, especially towards Robi, with whom she forms an continuous rivalry; she finds him an uninteresting and inadequate as a man, often making fun of his appearance and manners. Being an ambitious and resourceful go-getter, Irena quit modeling in order to find higher purpose; she gets a job at a local television station as a news reporter, but to her misfortune, she has to work alongside Robi.
- Rene Bitorajac as Robert "Robi" Kumerle, an overly-confident troublemaker with poor manners and a gangster attitude, he usually exaggerates his abilities and is prone to boasting. His interests mostly include women, sex, football and sports betting.
- Hrvoje Kečkeš as Kazimir "Kazo" Hrastek, a nerdy filmophile and a gamer who finds it difficult to talk to women due to the lack of his social skills. Determined to improve his life, he moves out of his mother's apartment and moves in with Robi and Teo, the latter being his best friend.
- Tarik Filipović as Teodor "Teo" Friščić, an intellectual lawyer who was thrown out of his apartment when his wife was convinced he's cheating on her.
- Nataša Dangubić as Lucija Toč, a naive hopeless romantic who leads an alternative lifestyle and has obscure interests; she studied Egyptology. A lot of her life philosophy comes from the teachings of her grandmother Baba Manda, who is most likely a reference to Baba Vanga. An unobtrusive person who is easily influenced by others, Lucija works at a video rental shop despite having no film knowledge; Gazda employs her solely because he wants a pretty women working at the shop. She is also a vegetarian, animal rights advocate, and a strong believer in magic and horoscope.

=== Recurring cast ===
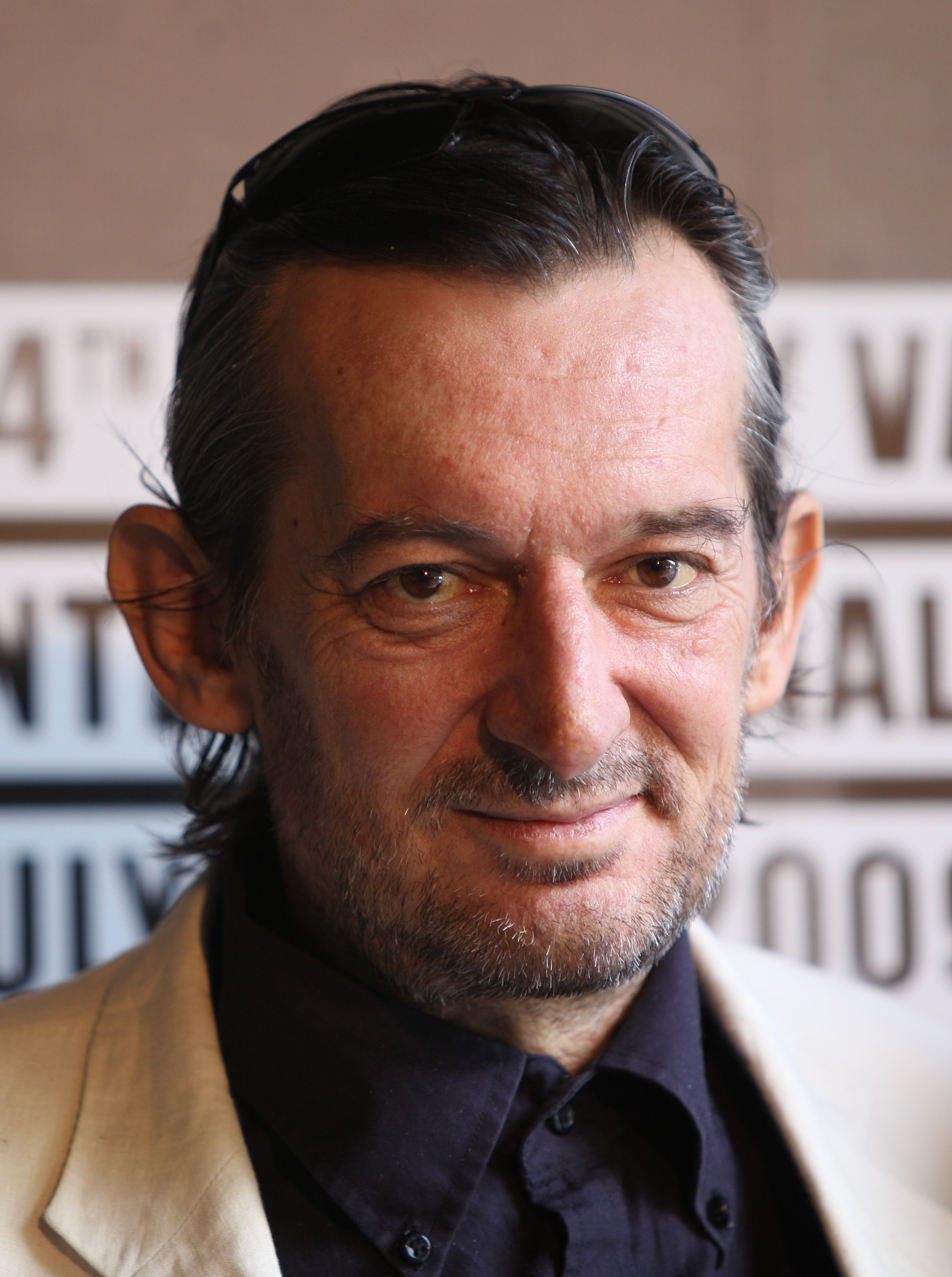
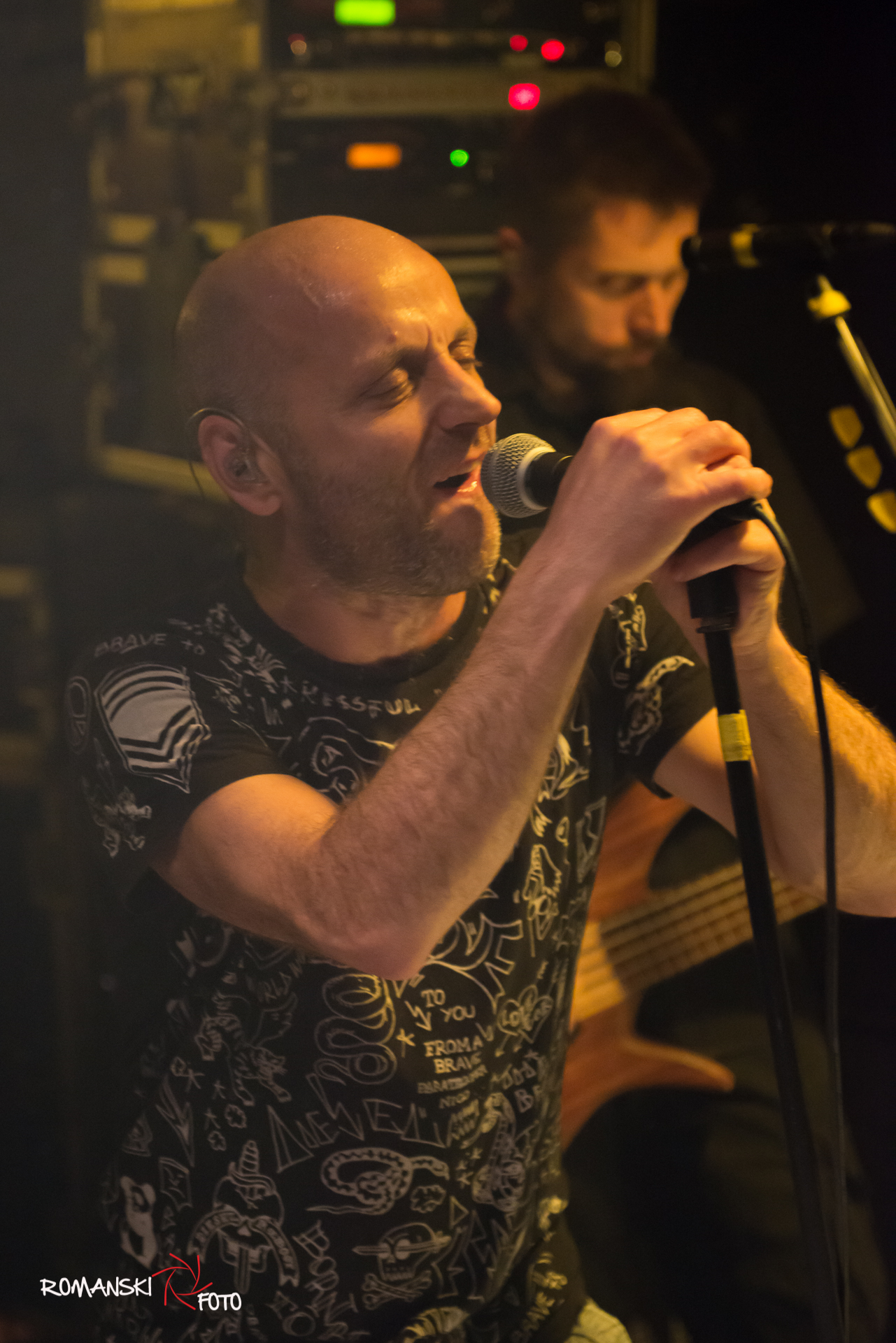
Predrag Vušović (left) portrayed Gazda; Mile Kekin (right) portrayed Erotman Saša.
- Predrag Vušović as Gazda ("The Boss"), the owner of the video rental shop.
- Dražen Čuček as Armando Vukušić, a waiter at the pub. He is a feminine gay man who always pokes fun at Robi.
- Mile Kekin as Erotoman Saša-Sale D., a frequent shopper at the video rental shop, he usually looks for erotic movies; the running gag is that the titles of the movies he refers to are parodies of actual titles of popular non-erotic movies.
- Mia Krajcar as Adriana (Jadranka) Ćurko
- Luka Peroš as Stražar

== Episodes ==
Season	Episodes	Originally released	
Season	Episodes	First released	Last released
1	14	15 April 2005	8 July 2005
2	26	21 October 2005	5 May 2006
3	Special	4 February 2007	
3	20	11 February 2007	29 June 2007
4	24	7 January 2008	11 June 2008
5	24	14 September 2009	8 March 2010

== Production ==
According to Kulenović, the creator of the series, Bitange i princeze was originally intended to be filmed in front of a live audience, but the budget did not allow it. Some of the episodes of the second season were written by Zoran Lazić and Tonči Kožul. In 2007, HRT's production expenses amounted to 225.000 HRK per episode.

== Reception and legacy ==
The series gained significant popularity during its reruns on HRT 2 and on the internet. In 2016, the readers of Večernji list voted Bitange i Princeze as the best Croatian television series since the year 2000. The series inspired many pub quizzes held in Zagreb, as well as a theatre play, originally held in Satirical Theatre Kerempuh, in which the main actors reprised their roles. The series has been compared to Friends.

From November to December 2021, Interflim, the production company behind the series, uploaded a HD remaster of the entire series to YouTube. As of 2024, the episodes drew over 20 million views on the platform.

Mila Elegović, who pursued a musical career after the series, recorded her first song for her character Irena Grobnik for an episode from the second season.

In 2026, several cast members were reunited for HRT's talk show television series Ponovno zajedno. The episode dedicated to Bitange i princeze, which featured Bitorajac, Filipović, Dangubić and Kekin as guests, aired on 8 October 2026 on HRT 1.
