= List of Bitange i princeze episodes =

The Croatian sitcom Bitange i princeze (English: Bums and Princesses) premiered on 15 April 2006 and concluded on 8 March 2010 after 108 episodes divided into five seasons. The series was broadcast by HRT.

== Series overview ==
Season	Episodes	Originally released	
Season	Episodes	First released	Last released
1	14	15 April 2005	8 July 2005
2	26	21 October 2005	5 May 2006
3	Special	4 February 2007	
3	20	11 February 2007	29 June 2007
4	24	7 January 2008	11 June 2008
5	24	14 September 2009	8 March 2010

== Episodes ==
=== Season 1 (2005) ===
No. overall	No. in season	Title	Original release date
1	1	"Pilot"	15 April 2005
After discovering that he cannot afford the ideal new apartment in Zagreb, Robert "Robi" Kumerle asks Kazimir "Kazo," a man he recently met in a pub and who just so happens to have moved out of his mother's apartment, to be his roommate. The problems start when Irena Grobnik tries to live in the same apartment as Lucija Toč, whom she also recently met at the video rental shop, and they both share rent costs. In the end, the boys get the apartment while the girls move into a nearby one. Robi asks Kazo's buddy Teodor "Teo," whose wife had kicked him out of their place, to live with him and Kazo.
2	2	"Episode 2"	22 April 2005
The five new neighbors form a friend group and get to know each other. Robi and Irena audition for a news reporter job at the local television station, whereas Kazo gets employed by Gazda at the video rental shop.
3	3	"Episode 3"	29 April 2005
Kazo is rescued from prison by Teo. It is Robi and Irena's first day of work.
4	4	"Episode 4"	6 May 2005
There is no water in half of the building. Teo acquires a new customer. Lucija and Irena paint the apartment. At work, Robi and Irena do some surprising actions.
5	5	"Episode 5"	13 May 2005
6	6	"Episode 6"	10 May 2005
7	7	"Episode 7"	28 May 2005
8	8	"Episode 8"	3 June 2005
9	9	"Episode 9"	10 June 2005
10	10	"Episode 10"	17 June 2005
11	11	"Episode 11"	24 June 2005
12	12	"Episode 12"	1 July 2005
14	14	"Episode 14"	8 July 2005
The apartment's owner's granddaughter arrives and plans to evict the residents. As they consider various options, it ultimately boils down to their individual attempts to woo the granddaughter.

=== Season 2 (2005–06) ===
No. overall	No. in season	Title	Original release date
15	1	"Episode 1"	21 October 2005
16	2	"Episode 2"	28 October 2005
17	3	"Pogodi tko ne dolazi na večeru"	4 November 2005
18	4	"Episode 4"	11 November 2005
19	5	"Episode 5"	18 November 2005
20	6	"Istinite draži"	25 November 2005
21	7	"Episode 7"	2 December 2005
22	8	"Episode 8"	16 December 2005
23	9	"Sretan Božić, gospodine Hrastek"	20 December 2005
24	10	"Pub mrtvih pjesnika"	23 December 2005
25	11	"Sv. Kumerle, milosti pun"	30 December 2005
26	12	"Nestali u 30 minuta"	6 January 2006
27	13	"Posljednje Kazino iskušenje"	13 January 2006
28	14	"Ljubavi u ofsajdu"	20 January 2006
29	15	"Pasja ljubav"	3 February 2006
30	16	"Mačak na vrućoj drvenoj klupi"	23 February 2006
31	17	"Pogodi tko dolazi na večeru"	3 March 2006
32	18	"Baba Manda"	17 March 2006
33	19	"Molhci 2 - Leteća smrt"	24 March 2006
34	20	"Episode 20"	24 March 2006
35	21	"Daj mi, daj mi medeni"	31 March 2006
36	22	"Mumije"	7 April 2006
37	23	"Episode 23"	14 April 2006
38	24	"Inkasator uvijek zvoni dvaput"	24 April 2006
39	25	"Karika koja nedostaje"	28 April 2006
40	26	"Bećari i kontese"	5 May 2006

=== Season 3 (2007) ===
No. overall	No. in season	Title	Original release date
–	–	"Specijal"	4 February 2007
41	1	"Ta divna stvorenja"	11 February 2007
42	2	"Noć gutača butelja"	18 February 2007
43	3	"Kazo i duhovi"	25 February 2007
44	4	"Kad porastem bit ću Kumerle"	8 March 2007
45	5	"Nazovi H radi humorstva"	15 March 2007
46	6	"Grimizni hrbat"	22 March 2007
47	7	"Rakija me bacila na dno i druge istinite laži"	29 March 2007
48	8	"Jedno vjenčanje i sprovod"	5 April 2007
49	9	"Anarhisti svih zemalja, ujedinite se!"	19 April 2007
50	10	"Impotencija, inspekcija, nutrija"	26 April 2007
51	11	"Sudnica Zvonimira Muffera"	3 May 2007
52	12	"Žohari, ose, gnjide"	10 May 2007
53	13	"Milenijsko gnijezdo"	17 May 2007
54	14	"Humanitarna večera"	24 May 2007
55	15	"Kaj jedeš? Kajmak!"	31 May 2007
56	16	"Taoci, krastavci, narodnjaci i rekordi"	7 June 2007
57	17	"Lovačka priča"	14 June 2007
58	18	"Možeš imat moje tijelo"	21 June 2007
59	19	"Moje bi tijelo tvoje htjelo"	28 June 2007
60	20	"Teroristička sezona"	29 June 2007

=== Season 4 (2008) ===
No. overall	No. in season	Title	Original release date
61	1	"Špijuni, lancuni, klauni"	7 January 2008
62	2	"A sad adio..."	14 January 2008
63	3	"Crne zvijeri"	21 January 2008
64	4	"Piši kući propalo je"	28 January 2008
65	5	"Kako je propao Rock'n'Roll na mom otoku"	4 February 2008
66	6	"Duge tople gaće"	11 February 2008
67	7	"Rašeljkina velika pustolovina"	18 February 2008
68	8	"Zakon braće Radić"	25 February 2008
69	9	"Uspon i pad Austrougarske"	3 March 2008
70	10	"Kratki film o marketingu"	10 March 2008
71	11	"Trudnice, bludnice, ludnice"	17 March 2008
72	12	"Gle, tko to snomori"	24 March 2008
73	13	"Noć živih mrtvaca"	31 March 2008
74	14	"Požuda, pobuna, pušiona"	7 April 2008
75	15	"Alkari i manekenke"	14 April 2008
76	16	"Mijenjam cimera"	21 April 2008
77	17	"Opaki i slavni"	28 April 2008
78	18	"Povratak Erotomana"	5 May 2008
79	19	"Smisao života Roberta Kumerlea"	12 May 2008
80	20	"Turbodadilja"	19 May 2008
81	21	"Kvizovi, Bugari, lumeni"	26 May 2008
82	22	"Europa express"	1 June 2008
83	23	"Stravične stranputice stvarnosti"	6 June 2008
84	24	"De ja vu"	11 June 2008

=== Season 5 (2009–10) ===
No. overall	No. in season	Title	Original release date
85	1	"Besmrtna pripomoć"	14 September 2009
86	2	"Karate na rate"	21 September 2009
87	3	"Ultimate Kumerletaur"	28 September 2009
88	4	"Cro-Cop Porter"	5 October 2009
89	5	"Kreatori i prostitutke"	12 October 2009
90	6	"Počinje rat"	19 October 2009
91	7	"Pješak sa Sutle"	26 October 2009
92	8	"Tajna topničkog dnevnika"	2 November 2009
93	9	"Skandali, portali, Kumerleov mali"	9 November 2009
94	10	"Pisci, mamci i bivši momci"	16 November 2009
95	11	"Karala me rumena divojka"	23 November 2009
96	12	"Mećava stoljeća"	30 November 2009
97	13	"Sedma runda"	7 December 2009
98	14	"Ljudomežurer"	14 December 2009
99	15	"Radujte se Bitange"	21 December 2009
100	16	"Teamrušing"	28 December 2009
101	17	"Rodijačka utjeha"	4 January 2010
102	18	"Kazoblanka"	11 January 2010
103	19	"Frankenstajn"	18 January 2010
104	20	"Atentat na gazdu"	25 January 2010
105	21	"Džoja paranoja"	1 February 2010
106	22	"Gumzejevi"	15 February 2010
107	23	"Povratak Gumzejevih"	22 February 2010
108	24	"Zbogom, žohari!"	8 March 2010
