= 24 Hours (2002 film) =

24 sata
- Directed by: Goran Kulenović; Kristijan Milić
- Written by: Goran Kulenović; Ivan Pavličić
- Starring: Marinko Prga; Hrvoje Kečkeš; Kristijan Topolovec; Janko Rakos
- Cinematography: Mario Sablic
- Edited by: Goran Guberovic; Slaven Jekauc
- Release date: 25 July 2002 (Pula Film Festival)
- Running time: 75 minutes
- Country: Croatia
- Language: Croatian

24 Hours (24 sata) is a Croatian anthology film released in 2002. The film is made up of two segments, Sigurna kuća, directed by Kristijan Milić, and Ravno do dna, directed by Goran Kulenović.
