= Ante Vican =

Croatian actor (1926–2014)

- Born: 1926; Imotski, Kingdom of Serbs, Croats and Slovenes
- Died: March 20, 2014 (age 88); Grude, Bosnia and Herzegovina
- Occupation: Actor

Ante Vican (1926 – 20 March 2014) was a Croatian actor.

== Selected filmography ==
Year	Title	Role	Notes
1978	Bravo maestro		
1979	The Return		
1999	Red Dust		
2000	Milky Way		
