= The Eighth Commissioner =

2018 film

- Film poster
- Croatian: Osmi povjerenik
- Directed by: Ivan Salaj
- Written by: Ivan Salaj
- Based on: Osmi povjerenik by Renato Baretić
- Produced by: Jozo Patljak
- Starring: Frano Mašković; Borko Perić
- Cinematography: Slobodan Trninić
- Edited by: Marin Juranić
- Music by: Alen Sinkauz; Nenad Sinkauz
- Release date: 5 January 2018
- Running time: 139 minutes
- Country: Croatia
- Language: Croatian

The Eighth Commissioner (Croatian: Osmi povjerenik) is a 2018 Croatian comedy film directed by Ivan Salaj. It was selected as the Croatian entry for the Best Foreign Language Film at the 91st Academy Awards, but it was not nominated.

== Plot ==
Based on the novel of same name by Renato Baretić, a disgraced politician is sent to a remote Croatian island to coordinate its first valid election. He hopes to succeed where the previous seven commissioners failed.

== Cast ==
- Frano Mašković as Siniša Mesnjak
- Borko Perić as Tonino Smeraldić
- Goran Navojec as Selim
- Filip Šovagović as Brkljačić
- Živko Anočić as Zorzi
- Božidar Smiljanić as Bonino
- Stojan Matavulj as Prime Minister
- Ivo Gregurević as Tonino's Father

== See also ==
- List of submissions to the 91st Academy Awards for Best Foreign Language Film
- List of Croatian submissions for the Academy Award for Best Foreign Language Film
