= Goran Kulenović =

Croatian film director and screenwriter (born 1971)

- Born: 1971 (age 54–55); Zagreb, SR Croatia, SFR Yugoslavia
- Occupation: Director
- Years active: 1992–present
- Parents: Muharem Kulenović; Zrinka Ostrogović

Goran Kulenović (born 1971) is a Croatian film director and screenwriter. He is best known for directing Play Me a Love Song.

== Selected filmography ==
Year	Title	Role	Notes
2002	24 Hours		
2007	Play Me a Love Song		
2020	Dar mar		
