= Stojan Matavulj =

Croatian film and television actor

- Born: 24 February 1961 (age 65); Novi Sad, PR Serbia, FPR Yugoslavia
- Occupation: Actor
- Years active: 1989–present
- Spouse: Branka Matavulj
- Children: 2

Stojan Matavulj (born 24 February 1961) is a Croatian actor.

== Biography ==
Matavulj was born in Novi Sad (at the time SR Serbia, Yugoslavia) where his father studied agronomy, and grew up in Split, Croatia. He received an acting degree at the Academy of Theatre, Film and Television in Zagreb, now part of the University of Zagreb. He was a theatre actor at the Croatian National Theatre in Split, and since 1988 he's been part of the ensemble at the Croatian National Theatre in Varaždin.

In October 2013, Matavulj caused a traffic accident that resulted in the death of Dolores Lambaša, and in 2016 the County court of Slavonski Brod sentenced him to a year in prison.

In 2022, Matavulj was awarded the Golden Arena for Best Actor for his role in the movie Zbornica (The Staffroom).

== Filmography ==
=== Television roles ===
- Mrkomir Prvi (2022–2023)
- Kumovi (2022–2023)
- Nad lipom 35 (2022)
- Dar Mar (2021)
- Crno bijeli svijet (2015)
- Tijardović (2013)
- Ruža vjetrova as Stipe Odak (2011–2013)
- Instruktor as Strikan (2010)
- Zakon! as Zdravko Maček (2009)
- Sve će biti dobro as Pročelnik (2009)
- Odmori se, zaslužio si as Gospodin Feliks (2009)
- Stipe u gostima as Jozo Zec (2008–2009)
- Zauvijek susjedi as Mato (2008)
- Tužni bogataš as Karlo (2008)
- Bitange i princeze as Dinko Grabić (2008)
- Dobre namjere as Dioničar (2008)
- Bibin svijet as Susjed Kosić (2007)
- Cimmer fraj as Grgo (2007)
- Balkan Inc. as Jole (2006)
- Naši i vaši as Milin muž (2002)
- Novo doba as Šimleša (2002)
- Obiteljska stvar as Mile Aničić (1998)

=== Movie roles ===
- Honey Bunny (2026)
- How Come It's All Green Out Here? (2025) The film is scheduled for premiere at KVIFF on 7 July 2025, competing for Proxima Grand Prix.
- Pelikan (2022)
- Sprovod (2022)
- Carpe Diem! (2022)
- Tuđa posla (2021)
- Zbornica (2021)
- Mekana bića (2021)
- Po tamburi (2021)
- Rat prije rata, (2018)
- Meso (2018)
- Osmi povjerenik (2018)
- Fuck Off I love you (2017)
- Lavina (2017)
- Zbog tebe (2016)
- Patrola na cesti (2016)
- Narodni heroj Ljiljan Vidić (2015)
- On Shaky Ground (2014)
- Svećenikova djeca (2013)
- Kolak Mirković (2013)
- Sonja i bik (2012)
- Kradljivac uspomena (2007)
- Pjevajte nešto ljubavno as Ante (2007)
- Mrtvi kutovi (2005.)
- Što je muškarac bez brkova? as Luka (2005)
- Snivaj, zlato moje (2005)
- La femme musketeer as Rahael Mayor (2004)
- Slučajna suputnica as Arbutina (2004)
- Dream Warrior (2003)
- Crvena prašina as Inspector (1999)
- Božićna čarolija (1997)
- Sedma kronika (1996)
- Gospa (1994)
- Na rubu pameti (1993)
- The Sands of Time (1992)
- Čovjek koji je volio sprovode (1989)
