= Hrvoje Kečkeš =

Croatian actor

- Born: 17 March 1975 (age 51); Zagreb, SFR Yugoslavia
- Occupation: Actor
- Years active: 1999–present

Hrvoje Kečkeš (born 17 March 1975) is a Croatian actor. He appeared in more than thirty films since 1999.

== Selected filmography ==
Year	Title	Role	Notes
2002	24 Hours		
2004	Sex, Drink and Bloodshed		
2006	The Border Post		
2007	Play Me a Love Song		
2012	Inspector Martin and the Gang of Snails		voice only
2018	Mali		
