= Bibin svijet =

- Genre: Comedy
- Based on: Ritas Welt by: Thomas Koch; Michael Gantenberg; Peter Freiberg
- Starring: Ana Begić; Janko Rakoš (s. 1–3); Sven Šestak (s. 4); Slavica Knežević; Amar Bukvić; Željko Duvnjak; Matija Jakšeković; Duška Jurić
- Country of origin: Croatia
- Original language: Croatian
- No. of seasons: 4
- No. of episodes: 72

Production
- Executive producers: Jan Štedul (s. 1–2); Sandra Ivančić (s. 3)

Original release
- Network: RTL
- Release: 18 April 2006 – 15 January 2011

Bibin svijet (English: Biba's World) is a Croatian comedy television series that was broadcast from 18 April 2006 to 15 January 2011 on RTL. The series follows the everyday life of the title character, Biserka "Biba" Fruk (Ana Begić), who is a cashier at a local grocery store.

The series is based on German television series Ritas Welt, which originally ran from 1999 to 2003 on RTL in Germany. Seventy-two episodes of Bibin svijet were aired over the course of four seasons, and the series was also re-aired on RTL Kockica.

== Premise ==
The series follows the characters Biserka "Biba" Fruk (Ana Begić), Đurđa Hrković (Slavica Knežević), Milivoj Babić (Amar Bukvić), Vlado Krunčić (Matija Jakšeković), and their boss Janko Piškorić (Željko Duvnjak) working at a small supermarket in Zagreb, Croatia. Despite great efforts, something always goes wrong, whether at home or in the market. Although Biba's life does not differ from that of other people (housework and home), her days are filled with comical situations and troubles arising from her language and free spirit. In the end, however, everything turns out well.

== Characters ==
- Ana Begić as Biserka "Biba" Fruk, the main character of the series. She lives in an apartment with her husband Martin and their children, Darko and Sandra. At home, Biba primarily engages in cleaning and cooking, occasionally watches television, and rests, often sleeping on the sofa or sharing affectionate moments with her husband. At work, she collaborates with her best friend Đurđa, who partially understands her. They frequently converse and visit each other. Biba is known for her sarcasm towards customers, often teasing them. She has no neighbors, except for one episode where she was not on good terms with a neighbor. Despite the challenges, she successfully resolves problems.
- Janko Rakoš (seasons 1–3) and Sven Šestak (season 4) as Martin Fruk, Biba's husband who works as an auto mechanic alongside his best friend Goran. Martin has a deep affection for Biba and enjoys playing football with Darko. He often feels frustrated with Sandra due to her teenage behavior but has never been strict or punitive towards her. On one occasion, while Milivoj and his girlfriend were at his workshop acting on a motorcycle, Martin checked to ensure everything was in order and became angry, though he remained calm. Despite Biba's good relationship with Đurđa, Đurđa sometimes irritates Martin. However, he once facilitated her meeting with famous motorists.
- Slavica Knežević as Đurđa Hrković, Biba's best friend, her co-worker at the market. She maintains a friendly relationship with Vlado and Milivoj, despite their occasional comments about her age. Đurđa lives with her mother in an apartment. Her mother is very protective, as she had a negative opinion of Đurđa's father and does not want Đurđa to experience similar problems. Biba has visited Đurđa's house for dinner twice and for a sleepover once, while Đurđa has visited Biba's home several times. In the end, Đurđa married Goran. Their relationship had its ups and downs, but they ultimately decided to marry.
- Amar Bukvić as Milivoj Babić, another employee at the supermarket. He has a primarily sarcastic relationship with Biba and Đurđa, although they collaborated in one episode during a strike and generally do not have major issues. Milivoj is obsessed with women and dated Tamara, who was supposed to marry Biba's brother, leading to Biba's lack of respect for her. His relationship with Tamara ended quickly. Đurđa sent flowers to Tamara, pretending to be her lover, which ultimately ruined Tamara and Milivoj's romance.
- Željko Duvnjak as Janko Piškorić, the supermarket manager who spends most of his time in his office, calculating salaries, organizing the store, and planning ways to improve earnings, such as introducing a children's corner. He was previously married but is now divorced. Initially, Janko was not the manager; he first appeared in the series' premiere episode, replacing the old boss, and was seen investigating a jar of garbage dumped on the supermarket floor. Despite his employees often engaging in activities other than work, he is not strict with them. In the final episode, he revealed that he has a crush on Biba.
- Duška Jurić as Sandra Fruk, Biba's only daughter and eldest child. She frequently seeks boyfriends, including one from Iceland, and one of them helped her achieve an A on a math test. Darko, her brother, often feels annoyed because she tries to be the center of attention, although they are not always in conflict. Sandra often complains that her parents embarrass her, and once they sent her to work at the supermarket to give her a different perspective. She contributed to the supermarket by introducing English phrases like "hot" and "cool" and by installing an ice cream machine.
- Valdemar Kušan as Darko Fruk, Biba's only son and youngest child. He often watches football with his father, usually calmly with a few exceptions. For instance, when Đurđa temporarily stayed at their home due to flooding, she invited a potential boyfriend for dinner at Biba's home. However, Darko and Martin disrupted the evening and were described as "wild and undisturbed."

== Series overview ==
Season	Episodes	Originally released	
Season	Episodes	First released	Last released
1	11	18 April 2006	27 June 2006
2	25	5 December 2006	17 April 2007
3	20	24 April 2007	3 March 2009
4	16	18 September 2010	15 January 2011
