= HPI (TV series) =

French-Belgian television series

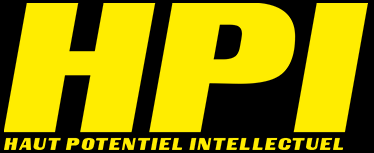
- French: Haut potentiel intellectuel
- Genre: Comedy crime fiction
- Created by: Stéphane Carrié; Alice Chegaray-Breugnot; Nicolas Jean
- Starring: Audrey Fleurot; Mehdi Nebbou; Bruno Sanches; Marie Denarnaud; Bérangère McNeese
- Music by: Yannis Dumoutiers
- Countries of origin: France; Belgium
- Original language: French
- No. of seasons: 5
- No. of episodes: 40

Production
- Producers: Anthony Lancret; Pierre Laugier; Bérengère Legrand
- Running time: 52 minutes
- Production companies: Itinéraire Productions; Septembre Productions; TF1; Pictanovo; Be-Films; RTBF

Original release
- Network: La Une (Belgium); TF1 (France); RTS1 (Switzerland)
- Release: 20 April 2021 (Belgium) – present

Related
- High Potential; Případy mimořádné Marty

HPI (acronym for French: Haut potentiel intellectuel, lit. 'high intellectual potential', an alternative term for giftedness) is a Franco-Belgian crime-comedy television series.

Created by Stéphane Carrié, Alice Chegaray-Breugnot, and Nicolas Jean, it is broadcast in Belgium on La Une since 20 April 2021, in Switzerland on RTS Un since 27 April 2021, in France on TF1 since 29 April 2021, and in Canada on Addik since 1 June 2022. It streams in the United States as HIP: High Intellectual Potential (Dubbed into English only) on Hulu since 12 July 2024. The series is a coproduction between Itinéraire Productions, Septembre Productions, TF1, Pictanovo, Be-Films, and RTBF.

It stars Audrey Fleurot as Morgane Alvaro, an intellectually highly gifted housekeeper, who becomes a consultant for the DIPJ (a police division that investigates serious crime) in Lille, and helps solve several cases thanks to her sharp mind.

== Synopsis ==
Morgane Alvaro is 38 years old, has 3 children from 2 ex-boyfriends, problems with authority, and, despite having an IQ of 160, works as a cleaning lady. One night, working at Lille police headquarters, she accidentally finds an important clue to a murder case, and, facing dismissal if the case is not solved, the superintendent assigns her to the case as consultant, much to the chagrin of inspector Adam Karadec, who's in charge of the case. Morgane dresses and acts inappropriately for her new job, often disobeys orders, has a difficult time managing her family life, and Karadec finds her nearly impossible to work with, but her flashes of brilliance are often crucial to solving the more difficult cases that the Lille detective squad deals with. In return for her work as a detective, the superintendent agrees to reopen the case of her first husband, who went missing after being arrested 15 years earlier.

== Cast ==
=== Main cast ===
- Audrey Fleurot as Morgane Alvaro
- Cypriane Gardin as Théa Alvaro
- Noé Vandevoorde as Eliott Alvaro
- Mehdi Nebbou as Adam Karadec
- Bruno Sanches as Gilles Vandraud
- Marie Denarnaud as Céline Hazan
- Bérangère McNeese as Daphné Forestier

== International adaptations ==
- Slovak TV Markíza released Výnimočná Nikol in September 2022.
- In Greece, Star TV launched IQ 160, an adaptation of the series produced by Barking Well Media, in March 2023.
- Czech TV NOVA released Případy mimořádné Marty on 30 April 2023.
- In Hungary, RTL launched a Hungarian adaptation of the series, titled A renitens, in February 2024.
- American television network ABC began airing High Potential in September 2024, produced by ABC Signature.
- Croatian television network RTL announced IQ 160, the first Croatian Voyo Original and a Croatian adaptation of the series, scheduled to premiere on Voyo in 2026.
- SkyShowtime announced to release and co-produce the Polish adaptation of the show with the Polish television network Polsat. The series is set to be called "Genialna M" which translates to "Genius M", the main character of Morgane has been renamed to "Marta" for more familiarity within the Polish public. The release of the first episode is scheduled for 2nd of December 2026.
- Turkish television network Show TV announced Cevher, a Turkish adaptation of the series, scheduled to premier in early 2027.
