= High Potential =

2024 American crime drama television series

- Genre: Crime drama; Comedy drama
- Created by: Drew Goddard
- Based on: HPI by: Nicolas Jean; Stéphane Carrié; Alice Chegaray-Breugnot
- Showrunners: Todd Harthan; Nora Zuckerman; Lilla Zuckerman
- Starring: Kaitlin Olson; Daniel Sunjata; Javicia Leslie; Deniz Akdeniz; Amirah J; Matthew Lamb; Judy Reyes; Steve Howey
- Music by: Josh Kramon; Jake Staley
- Country of origin: United States
- Original language: English
- No. of seasons: 2
- No. of episodes: 31

Production
- Executive producers: Pierre Laugier; Anthony Lancret; Jean Nainchrik; Alethea Jones; Sarah Esberg; Dan Etheridge; Rob Thomas; Drew Goddard; Todd Harthan; Marc Halsey; Diane Ruggiero-Wright; Victor Hsu; Kaitlin Olson; Nora Zuckerman; Lilla Zuckerman
- Producers: Vail Romeyn; Sarah J. Donohue
- Cinematography: Simon Chapman; Amanda Treyz; Giovani Lampassi; Lisa Wiegand; Beaudine Credle; Mathew Rüdenberg
- Editors: Philip Fowler; John Reyes-Nguyen; Tuan Quoc Le; Caroline Wang; Nicole Artzer; Andrew Behrens; John Norris; Faroukh Virani; Luke Pebler
- Running time: 40–44 minutes
- Production companies: Goddard Textiles; Spondoolie Productions; Taft Tennis; Zucks.; 20th Television (Note: Credited as ABC Signature for the first seven episodes)

Original release
- Network: ABC
- Release: September 17, 2024 – present

Related
- HPI; Případy mimořádné Marty

High Potential is an American crime comedy drama television series created by Drew Goddard for ABC. It is based on the 2021 Franco-Belgian television series HPI. The series stars Kaitlin Olson as Morgan Gillory, an intellectually gifted cleaning woman who becomes a police consultant. Also starring are Daniel Sunjata as Morgan's partner Adam Karadec and Judy Reyes as Selena Soto, the head of their unit. The series premiered on September 17, 2024. In January 2025, the series was renewed for a second season which premiered on September 16, 2025. In March 2026, the series was renewed for a third season which is slated to premiere on January 5, 2027. A new special episode is scheduled to air on February 14, 2027, right after Super Bowl LXI.

== Premise ==
The series follows Morgan Gillory, a single mother of three who works as a cleaner at the Los Angeles Police Department. Morgan has an IQ of 160, classifying her as a high-potential intellectual (HPI). When she unexpectedly solves a complex case using her unorthodox thinking and keen observational skills, she is recruited as a civilian consultant for the LAPD's Major Crimes Division. There, she is partnered with Detective Adam Karadec, a disciplined and methodical investigator whose by-the-book approach often clashes with Morgan's intuitive and unconventional ways.

A subplot follows Morgan's use of LAPD resources to investigate the 15-year-old disappearance of Roman, the father of her daughter Ava.

== Cast and characters ==
=== Main ===
- Kaitlin Olson as Morgan Gillory, a single mother with three children, an IQ of 160, and a wide range of knowledge. Morgan works as a cleaner for the LAPD until Selena offers her a consultant position.
- Daniel Sunjata as Adam Karadec, a detective who is initially skeptical about Morgan being an asset to the LAPD but later becomes her dedicated partner
- Javicia Leslie as Daphne Forrester, Major Crimes investigator and Oz's partner
- Deniz Akdeniz as Lev "Oz" Özdil, Major Crimes investigator and Daphne's partner
- Amirah J as Ava Sinquerra, (Note: She is listed as Ava Gillory in official sources, but the character confirms that her last name is Sinquerra in "The One That Got Away Part 1") Morgan's rebellious teenage daughter whose father, Roman, disappeared 15 years before the series begins
- Matthew Lamb as Elliot Radovic, Morgan's son with her second ex-partner, Ludo, who seems to have inherited his mother's high-potential intellect
- Judy Reyes as Selena Soto, The Major Crimes' Lieutenant and head of the Major Crimes Division, where Morgan serves as a consultant.
- Steve Howey as Nick Wagner (season 2), the new captain of the station

=== Recurring ===
- Taran Killam as Ludo Radovic, Morgan's ex-partner, Ava's ex-stepfather and Elliot and Chloe's father, who is a driving instructor. Despite their split, he and Morgan are on friendly terms, and he takes care of all three of the children as a "manny" salaried by the LAPD.
- Garret Dillahunt as Lieutenant Melon (season 1), the head of the LAPD's Robbery-Homicide Division
- JD Pardo as Tom (season 1), a janitor in the LAPD who is in nursing school and later takes a job in a hospital
- David Giuntoli as the Game Maker / Matthew Clark
- Mekhi Phifer as Arthur Ellis (season 2), a man who claims to be Roman's "friend" and looks after Morgan and Ava, seemingly at Roman's request
- John Pyper-Ferguson as Eric Hayworth (season 2), a man who is involved with Roman's disappearance
- Susan Kelechi Watson as Lucia (season 2), Karadec's ex-fiancée who he briefly reconnects with

=== Special guest star ===
- Jennifer Jason Leigh as Willa Quinn (season 2), a fixer for the powerful and wealthy people based in New York who has ties with Roman's disappearance

== Episodes ==
=== Series overview ===
Season	Episodes	Originally released		Rank	Average viewership (in millions)
Season	Episodes	First released	Last released	Rank	Average viewership (in millions)
1	13	September 17, 2024	February 11, 2025	2	16.14
2	18	September 16, 2025	April 7, 2026	3	16.00

=== Season 1 (2024–25) ===
No. overall	No. in season	Title	Directed by	Written by	Original air date	U.S. viewers (millions)
1	1	"Pilot"	Alethea Jones	Drew Goddard	September 17, 2024	3.59
Morgan Gillory, an overnight janitor at the LAPD, accidentally knocks over a murder case file while working. As she picks up the file's crime scene photos, she determines that the victim's wife, and the case's primary suspect, is being framed and marks it on the LAPD's murder board. Detective Adam Karadec is enraged that she tampered with police evidence, but Morgan convinces Lieutenant Selena Soto that her deduction is correct. Selena has Karadec work with Morgan on the case and locate the wife, Lynette Acosta. Morgan and Karadec deduce that Lynette's husband was killed by one of her clients, who then kidnapped Lynette to keep her quiet. After Morgan and Karadec find Lynette, Selena offers Morgan a full-time position as a consultant, but Morgan refuses. However, after trying to have a conversation with her eldest daughter, Ava, Morgan accepts the offer on the condition that Selena pays for childcare and helps Morgan find Ava's father Roman, who vanished 15 years ago.
2	2	"Dancers in the Dark"	Marc Webb	Todd Harthan & Marc Halsey	September 24, 2024	3.68
Morgan's first official case involves a tap dancer, Damian, who was pushed off a roof onto his car. Lieutenant Melon of the LAPD's Robbery Division comes to Selena for help on a case involving a string of jewelry store heists. Morgan and Karadec find the tap dancer's partner, Roland. Roland claims that a third person pushed Damian. Morgan proves Roland's claim, and realizes that Roland was the intended target. Morgan and Karadec find Roland too late, killed at a nightclub. After observing the nightclub's security footage, Morgan realizes that the killer is also Lieutenant Melon's jewel thief. The LAPD sets up a sting operation to catch the killer/jewel thief. Morgan tells Selena that she last saw Roman when she sent him out to get diapers for Ava. At home, Morgan tries to connect with Ava over her and Roman's art talent, but it upsets Ava, as she believes Roman walked out on them. Morgan uses her first paycheck to bring her car home, cheering her kids up. Selena tells Morgan that Roman's car was impounded shortly after his disappearance with a box of diapers inside, implying his intent to return home.
3	3	"Dirty Rotten Scoundrel"	Rebecca Asher	Dennis Saldua	October 8, 2024	3.78
While working on a case involving a con artist/rideshare driver, Karadec gets increasingly frustrated with Morgan not following police protocol or letting him know what she plans on doing. After nearly getting injured by a suspect, Karadec yells at Morgan, leading to Morgan quitting her job. However, she decides to come back the next day and solve the case. At home, Morgan is upset to find Ava alone in her room with a possible boyfriend, despite Ava's insistence that they're only studying. Morgan gets even more upset when she learns Ludo allowed it without her knowledge or permission. She tells Ludo he overstepped his authority with Ava, but Ludo takes it as a reminder that he is not Ava's biological father. Morgan later apologizes to Ludo. Meanwhile, Selena and Melon discover that a mural Roman painted just before his disappearance was located in a neighborhood known for illegal activity, and believe he might have been silenced because he was a potential witness to a crime committed there.
4	4	"Survival Mode"	Pete Chatmon	Andrea M. Scott and Marc Halsey	October 15, 2024	3.36
A worried mother, Mia Ashford, comes to the station after her estranged husband fails to drop off their daughters to her. Morgan and Karadec go to the husband's home, and find him dead. Suspicion falls on Mia's father, a wealthy hotelier, and Mia, but Morgan is convinced that Mia is innocent, and tries to prove it, which puts her in contention with Karadec and Selena. When the kidnapper demands a ransom, Morgan convinces Mia to trust her and Karadec to help. Though the kidnapper escapes, Morgan deduces from his abandoned car that the kidnapper is the chauffeur of Mia's family, who was in love with her and made a plan to look like a hero to win her over. Morgan helps the LAPD find the girls, and reunite them with their mother. Morgan deals with insomnia through the episode, worrying Karadec and Selena. After solving the case, she's finally able to find peace and fall asleep.
5	5	"Croaked"	Daisy von Scherler Mayer	Diane Ruggiero-Wright	October 22, 2024	3.60
The team investigates the death of a veterinarian, poisoned by a substance on her hands. While investigating the crime scene, Morgan tranquilizes Karadec to prevent him from getting poisoned. While Morgan is with Karadec, Daphne and Oz work the case from another angle, but all four of them end up at an apartment, where they learn the vet was stealing exotic pets from their owners and trafficking them to afford a house for her girlfriend. Oz gets a confession from the girlfriend's husband, but Morgan thinks something is off. While Karadec is on a date, Morgan does some investigating on her own, and realizes the girlfriend adopted the vet's son, whom the vet had been forced to give up due to a teenage pregnancy. The killer is revealed to be the girlfriend, who was worried the vet would steal her son. Daphne and Oz return the trafficked pets to their rightful owners. At home, Morgan discovers Ava has been taking birth control pills. Morgan wants to confront her, but Ludo suggests waiting for Ava to come to Morgan. Morgan eventually tells Ava she found the pills. Ava tells Morgan she's taking the pills for her complexion, easing Morgan's fears.
6	6	"Hangover"	Rebecca Asher	Kassia Miller & Myung Joh Wesner	October 29, 2024	3.09
The CEO of a healthcare device company is found dead in her office the day after a company party. The prime suspect is the CEO's assistant, who was found passed out in the same room, but woke up hung over and with no memory of the previous night. Despite all signs pointing to the assistant, Morgan strongly believes in her innocence. Morgan and Karadec eventually find a video showing that the CEO tried but failed to kill the assistant, allowing the assistant to go free due to self-defense. While Morgan is working on the case, Tom, a janitor at the LAPD, starts a conversation with her. After solving the case, Morgan leaves a phone number for Tom to see.
7	7	"One of Us"	James Roday Rodriguez	Teleplay by : Marc Halsey; Story by : Marc Halsey and Jordana Lewis Jaffe & Dennis Saldua	November 12, 2024	3.36
While visiting the LAPD bullpen with Ava on Morgan's day off, Morgan, Ava and the team are held hostage by two military soldiers who claim their friend and fellow soldier was wrongly accused of murder. While Morgan works the case from inside, Karadec works from outside to locate the true killer. The next day, as thanks for saving everyone, Melon gives Morgan her own desk.
8	8	"Obsessed"	Rob Corn	Andy Berman & Nicole French & Marc Halsey	January 7, 2025	5.69
A woman is attacked on a beach and presumed dead until Morgan notices she's breathing. While trying to figure out who wanted to kill her, the team learns the woman was investigating a two-year-old cold case - the murder of her boyfriend, found dead on the same beach. Frustrated with the lack of leads, Morgan is reminded of her own cold case involving Roman. She has a dinner date with Tom, but postpones it and spends the night working with Karadec. After Morgan solves the case, she and Tom finally enjoy their date, but are interrupted when Selena calls. She tells Morgan she found Gio Conforth, a black market dealer in contact with Roman before his disappearance.
9	9	"The RAMs"	Alethea Jones	Rob Thomas	January 14, 2025	5.79
The team investigates the intentional hit-and-run of a famous Los Angeles sportscaster, which involves figuring out who owned the Jensen Interceptor British racing car used as the murder weapon. Things get complicated when the sportscaster's son, the sportscaster's attractive female house manager, and a neighbor with a grudge all become potential suspects. While working the case, Morgan runs into Tom, who is moving to San Diego to become a nurse. Morgan is downcast until Tom smiles and says, "San Diego isn't that far." Meanwhile, Selena gets in touch with a reluctant Conforth, who offers to provide info on Roman in exchange for getting his nephew's sentence reduced. Selena shares details of Morgan's case with Karadec, asking him to convince his friend (and former date) the DA to reduce the sentence. Karadec agrees. Later, Conforth reaches out to Morgan, saying he would be out of town for a few days but promising to contact her about Roman. Morgan is skeptical, as she does not believe Conforth even knew Roman. Conforth convinces her by saying Roman called his family the "RAMs" (Roman, Ava, Morgan), something only Roman and Morgan knew.
10	10	"Chutes and Murders"	Eric Dean Seaton	Kassia Miller	January 21, 2025	5.75
The investigation into a nanny's death begins when her body is discovered at a playground. Authorities first believed she died in an accident on a child's slide. However, further examination revealed blunt force trauma to the head, indicating a homicide. Witnesses reported a suspicious man, later identified as Chuck, a private investigator/former colleague of Karadec, following Tara. Chuck revealed he was hired by Brent Lewis, one of her employers, to monitor Tara due to concerns about her behavior toward their child. These concerns stemmed from Facebook posts by a "concerned mother" alleging Tara posed a threat. The posts were later traced to Oksana, a Russian nanny who harbored intense resentment toward Tara because she was friends with the nanny she replaced. Oksana created a fake Facebook account to impersonate the "concerned mother" and fuel the conspiracy. Karadec cleverly manipulated the nannies into exposing Oksana by implying their workplaces had nanny cams.
11	11	"The Sauna at the End of the Stairs"	Viet Nguyen	Kat Sieniuc	January 28, 2025	4.77
On his deathbed, George Donovan, a wealthy Beverly Hills patriarch, confessed on camera to murdering his son-in-law, Barry Johnson, by pushing him down the basement stairs, breaking his neck. However, Selena, who had initially investigated the case 10 years ago, always suspected a drug deal gone wrong and regretted not following her instincts. As she and her team, particularly Morgan, delved deeper, they uncovered that Barry had actually been electrocuted in the shower before his body was disposed of down the laundry chute, staining George's clothes with blood. This revelation unraveled a tangled web of family conflicts, revealing Barry's history of domestic abuse against his wife, Heather. The night of his death, a heated argument at the Donovan residence had led Barry to storm off, setting the stage for the real crime. Further investigation exposed an unexpected twist: Cody, Barry's son, was the real killer. In a desperate attempt to protect his mother, Cody used a hair dryer to electrocute his father in the shower, dropped his body down the laundry chute, and later staged the scene to throw off authorities, making it appear as though Barry had been drinking in the sauna. Given Cody's age at the time of the crime, he would be tried as a minor, ensuring a reduced sentence.
12	12	"Partners"	Jennifer Getzinger	Todd Harthan & Marc Halsey	February 4, 2025	4.84
Morgan works with Karadec and the team to investigate the death of tech mogul Anson Pierce, who collapsed after being poisoned. They have to work with the FBI and Ronnie, Karadec's former partner. Morgan clashes with the FBI, but Karadec convinces Ronnie to let Morgan look at the evidence the FBI collected, and Morgan finds a clue that leads them to Kenneth Sutton, a toxicologist whose daughter committed suicide after being cyberbullied on Anson's app. When Morgan and Karadec question Kenneth, he tries to flee, but dies from a fall. Morgan helps Karadec and Ronnie figure out that one of Anson's security guards was Kenneth's accomplice − he was dating Kenneth's daughter when she died. Karadec tells Morgan about how Ronnie left after they were set up as corrupt cops, but Karadec cleared their names. The two make amends and Ronnie offers Karadec a position at the FBI, but he declines, saying Morgan is his new partner. Ludo becomes overwhelmed with his childcare duties and collapses in exhaustion, scaring Elliot. Morgan comforts both of them, then she and the kids surprise Ludo with Mexican food and a movie to thank him.
13	13	"Let's Play"	James Roday Rodriguez	Todd Harthan & Marc Halsey	February 11, 2025	5.16
A psychopath kidnaps people from a grief counseling group, including Oz, and wants the LAPD to "play" with him, using various games as clues to the victims' locations. Meanwhile, Conforth returns, and tells Morgan that he only plans on working directly with her, not the LAPD. Morgan accepts the terms, but Karadec wants to be the one who talks to Conforth. Conforth tells Morgan that before he disappeared, he was working for a woman named Lyla. Karadec, using Ronnie's connections, learns that Lyla was an FBI agent who died around the time Roman disappeared, and had Roman working for her as an informant. Conforth calls for Morgan to meet him at a hotel for some info, but Karadec goes instead. Conforth is hesitant to trust him, but gives Karadec the information. Meanwhile, Morgan is getting groceries with her kids, and a stranger helps her. When she gets home, she finds a message from the kidnapper, and Morgan realizes that the kidnapper was the stranger she met earlier. Morgan then gets a call from Karadec, who tells her that he knows Roman's location.

=== Season 2 (2025–26) ===
No. overall	No. in season	Title	Directed by	Written by	Original air date	U.S. viewers (millions)
14	1	"Pawns"	James Roday Rodriguez	Todd Harthan & Marc Halsey	September 16, 2025	4.34
It's been one week after the serial kidnapper--now referred to as the Game Maker--made contact with Morgan. Concerned about the safety and well-being of her family, Morgan and Ludo have been keeping the kids in the house, with police stationed outside. One day, Morgan finds a flyer for a security company in her mail, addressed to a different house in her neighborhood. Going back to the LAPD, she finds out that the house's owner is a single mom who's gone missing. Morgan and Karadec find clues leading back to the missing woman's boss as the likely kidnapper/murderer, but Morgan insists that the Game Maker is framing him. Eventually, the Game Maker comes to the LAPD on his own, saying he heard they were looking for him. Meanwhile, Lieutenant Soto sends Oz and Daphne to Henderson, Nevada, following Conforth's tip to locate Roman.
15	2	"Checkmate"	James Roday Rodriguez	Marc Halsey	September 23, 2025	3.84
Karadec interrogates the Game Maker about the missing woman, but he admits to nothing while secretly taunting Morgan. While Karadec tries to prevent the woman's ex-husband from killing her boss, Morgan finds the woman in the Game Maker's apartment building. Despite this, the LAPD aren't able to arrest the Game Maker, until Morgan ties him to the blood he used to frame the woman's boss. The Game Maker isn't willing to go to jail, so he attempts to jump from his apartment to his death, only to land on a crash pad and get arrested by the LAPD. Meanwhile, Oz and Daphne find a man identifying himself as Roman Sinqerra, but Morgan doesn't recognize him. Later, the man introduces himself to Morgan as Arthur, who claims that Roman wanted him to keep an eye on Morgan and her kids. However, while they both trust Morgan, neither of them trust the police. Arthur leaves Morgan with a card to call him.
16	3	"Eleven Minutes"	Nancy Hower	Bob Goodman & Eric I. Lu	September 30, 2025	4.24
A man is found braindead behind a restaurant. Morgan and Karadec learn that the man was likely attacked so that his heart could be donated to someone. Meanwhile, Morgan tells Ava about Roman being in Henderson, but Ava doesn't take it well.
17	4	"Behind the Music"	Todd Biermann	Marqui Jackson & Nicole French	October 7, 2025	4.51
An old woman hallucinates a murder and calls the police, but when Morgan and Karadec question her, she denies it. Later that day, the same woman is found dead after being pushed down the stairs. Morgan and Karadec realize the woman's hallucination came from an actual memory she witnessed, but was never solved. Meanwhile, at the LAPD, Morgan learns Soto could potentially become a new captain, but she wasn't chosen. Before she leaves, Morgan meets the LAPD's new captain, Nick Wagner.
18	5	"Content Warning"	Pete Chatmon	Katie McElhenney	October 14, 2025	4.15
A reporter and her car are found at the bottom of the lake. The team learns that she was undercover as an ASMR streamer at a content house, and try to figure out why. At the LAPD, Captain Nick Wagner officially introduces himself to the Major Crimes division, and tries to get one-on-one meetings with everyone to learn more about them. Meanwhile, Morgan tries to convince Arthur to give her Roman's backpack, but he only agrees to do so when Ava intervenes. Angry that Ava followed Morgan, despite the fact that she didn't want Ava around Arthur, Morgan grounds her, while Ava calls her out for being a hypocrite.
19	6	"Chasing Ghosts"	Viet Nguyen	Rebecca Kirsch & Jordan Rosenberg	October 21, 2025	4.27
A man in the midst of a divorce dies in a house thought to be haunted. Morgan and Karadec learn that his ex-wife wanted the house and had hired someone to haunt him. Meanwhile, Ava is still upset with Morgan for being grounded while Elliot tries to mediate. Later, the two find a drawing in Roman's backpack of Ava's dance recital when she was younger, indicating that despite having gone into hiding, Roman was still watching them.
20	7	"The One That Got Away"	Nancy Hower	Marc Halsey	October 28, 2025	4.02
Morgan and Karadec are forced to investigate the theft of a high-value painting alongside an "art recovery expert", Rhys Eastman, who works for the owner's insurance company. Captain Wagner steps in to take control of the case after Morgan and Eastman enter the crime scene without police supervision. Rhys receives a ransom demand for the painting but Wagner decides to sideline him and Morgan. The captain and Karadec butt heads while attending the rendezvous and the ransomer gets away. Meanwhile, Ava reaches out to Arthur to ask about her dad, while Soto looks into the contents of Roman's backpack.
21	8	"The One That Got Away: Part Two"	Nancy Hower	Marc Halsey	January 6, 2026	5.65
Continuing from the previous episode, the art museum's curator is found dead, killed in the museum's parking lot. While Karadec works with Wagner, Morgan suspects that Rhys might secretly be a well-known art thief, especially once the painting is recovered, it's found to be a fake. Morgan realizes the owners attempted to pull off an insurance scam using the curator and a fake version of the painting they had made, not willing to part with the real one. While Karadec and Wagner arrest the couple, Rhys steals the original painting. However, after being confronted by Morgan, decides to give the painting to the original owner, an old woman whose family owned it before it was stolen in World War II. Meanwhile, after Arthur is attacked by a person, Soto meets with him, and he confirms his attacker matched a person in one of Roman's photos. Arthur later calls Soto informing her that he is being followed and heading to her, but never shows up. Arthur's phone is later found just outside his truck, abandoned. While Morgan celebrates with her coworkers after solving the case, the attacker silently watches Morgan.
22	9	"Under the Rug"	Viet Nguyen	Bob Goodman	January 13, 2026	5.70
A hitman for hire is found dead in the desert mountains while stalking his target, Douglas Newmeyer, an inventor and businessman. After confirming the identity and location of the target, the team discovers that the hitman was actually FBI agent Belanger, working undercover to uncover who ordered the hit. Meanwhile, after Morgan receives a bouquet of flowers from Rhys, Elliot feels uncomfortable, holding out hope that Morgan and Ludo will eventually get back together. Karadec, Oz, and Daphne arrive and interrupt the FBI's staged killing of Newmeyer, unaware that their undercover agent is already dead. Wagner joins the case after being contacted by his former colleague, Myra Taylor, the case manager. The FBI and LAPD conduct a joint briefing, chaired by Wayne Vincent. Morgan confronts Newmeyer about the dangers of his vacuum cleaner, while Daphne and Oz visit Newmeyer's house to dig deeper. It is revealed that Newmeyer is having an affair with Joel Dorskind's wife, and that Joel hired Belanger to kill Newmeyer, though he did not kill Belanger himself. Wagner and Karadec recover a stash box from Belanger's apartment, with Wagner beginning to suspect that Karadec is covering for Morgan and manipulating the investigation. Newmeyer is brought into the briefing room, where it is revealed that Wayne Vincent killed Belanger after Belanger caught him taking bribes from Newmeyer to keep an eye on the investigation into his vacuum cleaner, whom Wayne met when was stationed in Uppsala, Sweden.
23	10	"Grounded"	Tara Miele	Nicole French & Marqui Jackson	January 20, 2026	5.93
During a skydiving lesson, an Air Force therapist is found dead before he even hits the ground. After Morgan requests a rush job for the autopsy, she is banned from the case and sent to a detective training academy. Following up on a death threat in the victim's equipment, the team discovers that he was investigating PTSD-related symptoms in his patients, following the death of one. Meanwhile, Arthur finally calls Soto and confirms he is okay, but reveals he went into hiding to protect himself from the man who was looking for the backpack. Despite Karadec and Soto's objections, Wagner has Morgan secretly work on the case during her training, but she is repeatedly caught. Despite a positive recommendation from the training academy, Morgan is fired nonetheless by Internal Affairs. Before the paperwork goes through, Morgan and the team discover that the victim had learned that test pilots were struggling with hypoxia due to faulty oxygen supply, and was killed by the test plane's lead engineer to keep his silence. Soto finally confronts Wagner for overruling her authority and taking other cases, citing it as the reason Morgan was fired. After Wagner apologizes, Soto gets Morgan reinstated by blackmailing the Internal Affairs representative with evidence of his infidelity.
24	11	"NPC"	Anu Valia	Eric I. Lu	January 27, 2026	6.06
A retired pro gamer is found dead in the middle of the street, after being poisoned and hallucinating that an in-game enemy was trying to kill him in real life. Meanwhile, Karadec runs into an old girlfriend, Lucia, whom he broke up with due to prioritizing his work over her too often. After encouragement from both Morgan and Soto, Karadec decides to date Lucia again.
25	12	"The Faust and the Furious"	Kelli Williams	Katie McElhenney	February 3, 2026	5.91
The CEO of a longevity research company is found stabbed in an electronically locked room in his smart house. With no possible way for someone else to enter his home without being tracked, Morgan and Karadec realize that the victim euthanized himself due to a toxic gas in the room. When the two later end up locked in the same room, Morgan's fears over leaving her family lead her to suffer from a panic attack until Karadec calms her down. Meanwhile, Oz prepares a memorial for his late father, only to learn that the funeral home did not provide a headstone for his father's grave, taking advantage of his mother's naivety in the process.
26	13	"In The Driver's Seat"	Maureen Bharoocha	Teleplay by : Jordan Rosenberg; Story by : Jordan Rosenberg & Bob Goodman	March 3, 2026	4.95
A dealership carjacking gone wrong leads to the body of a John Doe being found with a disfigured face and a gunshot wound. The team later discovers that the victim, identified as a professor with a history of environmental protests, was killed at his house beforehand and later dumped at the dealership, with the carjackers having no actual role in his death. Meanwhile, as Ava considers her college future, Morgan receives a letter inviting Elliot to an elite preparatory school in Connecticut, leaving her conflicted over letting him go due to his age. Arthur's attacker is revealed to have been stalking Morgan and her family, but Arthur is able to subdue him and drives off with him. It's later discovered that the dealership's owner, who was in legal trouble with the victim, was the one behind the victim's initial murder and planted the body at his own dealership to make it seem like he had been framed. After some consideration, Elliot turns down the invite to the prep school, choosing to spend more time with his family. Soto later calls Morgan with news: Arthur, who's been arrested, has discovered that the attacker is also allegedly the man behind Roman's initial disappearance.
27	14	"If You Come For the Queen"	Anu Valia	Rebecca Kirsch & Nicole French	March 10, 2026	5.02
Dottie, Morgan's teacher from the detective training academy, as well as Daphne's former Field Training Officer, is nearly killed while visiting the spa. Soto has Daphne lead the investigation, as she's more familiar with Dottie. Karadec and Oz work together on an overdose murder investigation, until Morgan realizes that both victims wore sensors that came from the same spa, leading to a connection. While the rest of the team work on the case, Soto learns that the man who was responsible for Roman's disappearance is named Eric Hayworth, who is former Special Forces. However, Hayworth is more afraid of the woman he works for, Willa Quinn, than he is of Soto or the LAPD. Meanwhile, Ava gets selected for an exclusive art program, but a post on social media questions if she only got selected because she was black, leading to her having a heart-to-heart conversation with Daphne.
28	15	"Pie In the Sky"	David Straiton	Eric I. Lu	March 17, 2026	5.28
An unknown assailant throws a pie in the face of astronaut Teddy Barrow, which contained a nerve agent. Soto decides to go to New York to track down Willa Quinn. Morgan discovers the assailant is a sprinter. At the college they talk to the roommate of the suspect. A nun, who is the track coach and choir coach of Arden is hiding her, but Arden didn't know what was in the pie. The speech Teddy was going to give would have endorsed AstroMollis, a low-orbit tourism contract. Willa and Soto meet, go to a party, and meet in her office, with Soto trying to get information out of Quinn, but to no avail. As Soto is getting off the plane in LA, she sees that Quinn was on the same flight with her.
29	16	"Turn, Up the Heat"	Viet Nguyen	Bob Goodman & Katie McElhenney	March 24, 2026	5.17
A delivery robot drives through the blood of a dead man dangling from the architectural feature of an abandoned building called Encase. Morgan finds out that the man is a local graffiti artist known as "Dfnkt". Morgan's friend, an urban art professor, finds that Defunct was in tagging battle with "Psyclops". The artists had called a truce and were getting paid to tag the building. Morgan and Karadec go back to the building to discover someone set up a butane torch and gasoline filled glove to make the building explode; the resulting explosion injures Karadec. The architect of the building is the murderer. At the station, Willa Quinn comes to talk to Soto, who has restricted Quinn from meeting with Hayworth. Quinn, using her connections, has the FBI put Hayworth in protective custody, restricting Soto's ability to meet with Hayworth. Meanwhile, Wagner's father, Wagner Sr., wants to use Morgan for a political anti-corruption taskforce and leave the LAPD, and has Wagner push the offer, but Morgan refuses. It's later revealed that Wagner's father made the offer under Quinn's orders. Quinn threatens Wagner Sr. to work with her if he doesn't want a political scandal to be uncovered.
30	17	"Second Sunday"	Nancy Hower	Todd Harthan & Marc Halsey	March 31, 2026	5.26
A high-tech vault security storage facility is hit, but very little is stolen. Morgan deduces that the robbers were only interested in copying data from a black box, which contains several archived and top-secret information for the Los Angeles government. Wagner is highly invested in the case, as the robbers' descriptions match the ones that killed his fiancée. After the robbers cause panic by shutting down the various systems on Mother's Day, including credit card machines, Morgan deduces that the robbers are planning on stealing cash from pneumatic tubes under the city. Before Morgan goes home, Wagner kisses her in the elevator. Meanwhile, Soto informs Karadec that Hayworth was found dead in his cell while in the FBI's custody, likely killed and made to look as a suicide by Quinn. Soto also informs Karadec that Quinn was meeting with Wagner Sr., leading them to wonder where Wagner's loyalty lies.
31	18	"Family Tree"	Alethea Jones	Todd Harthan & Marc Halsey	April 7, 2026	5.36
A woman who is one half of a TV celeb couple is found dead by the pool of a hotel, which happens to be the same hotel that Lucia works. Morgan is not sure that Karadec can stay objective when Lucia is suspected of being involved. It's later revealed the murderer was a con-artist and Lucia's ex-boyfriend; Lucia is arrested as an accessory due to hiding evidence of the murder. Meanwhile, Morgan and Wagner meet with Quinn and Wagner Sr. to gain information on Roman. Quinn warns Morgan about what she's getting into, but gives her a file that Lyla Flynn, the FBI Agent that Roman worked with, was actually dirty, and planned on coming clean, but was killed by Roman. At home, Ava needs an idea for an art project, and tears up pieces of Roman's art to make it. While at Ava's art show, Morgan gets called by Wagner to meet a possible informant. A shadowy figure watches Ava from a distance, as Morgan goes to meet Wagner, only to find him bleeding from a bullet wound in his back.

== Production ==
=== Development ===
On September 20, 2022, High Potential was given a pilot order by ABC. The pilot was written by Drew Goddard. It is based on the 2021 Franco-Belgian television series HPI : Haut potentiel intellectuel. On May 16, 2023, High Potential was picked to series by ABC. The series was created by Goddard who was expected to executive produce alongside Sarah Esberg, Rob Thomas, Dan Etheridge, Pierre Laugier, Anthony Lancret, Jean Nainchrik, and Alethea Jones. Jones also directed the pilot. Thomas also was expected to serve as the showrunner. Kaitlin Olson was expected to serve as producer. Production companies involved with the series are Goddard Textiles, Spondoolie Productions, Itinéraire Productions, Septembre Productions, and ABC Signature. On June 5, 2024, Thomas exited as the showrunner for the series. On June 21, 2024, Todd Harthan was announced as the new showrunner who would also serve as an executive producer, replacing Thomas. High Potential is the last series from ABC Signature before the division was folded into 20th Television on October 1, 2024.

On January 21, 2025, ABC renewed the series for a second season. Five months later, Olson was promoted from producer to executive producer for the second season. On March 5, 2026, ABC renewed the series for a third season, with Harthan stepping down as the showrunner. On May 6, 2026, Nora Zuckerman and her sister Lilla Zuckerman were named as the new showrunners for the third season. Filming for season 3 began on June 29, 2026.

=== Casting ===
Upon the series pickup announcement, Olson, Daniel Sunjata, Javicia Leslie, Deniz Akdeniz, Amirah J, Matthew Lamb, and Judy Reyes were cast in starring roles. On July 1, 2024, Garret Dillahunt joined cast in a recurring capacity. On August 21, 2024, Taran Killam was cast in a recurring role. On June 26, 2025, Steve Howey joined the cast as a new series regular for the second season. On July 14, 2025, Mekhi Phifer was cast in an unnamed recurring role for the second season. On August 23, 2025, it was reported that David Giuntoli who appeared on the first season finale episode is set to recur for the second season. On January 15, 2026, Susan Kelechi Watson joined the cast in a recurring role for the second season.

== Release ==
High Potential premiered on ABC on September 17, 2024. The series was later made available to stream on Hulu. Due to the show's initial atypical production schedule and Kaitlin Olson's commitment to her other television role on FX's It's Always Sunny in Philadelphia, ABC only ordered 13 episodes for the first season instead of a longer 20-episode season. The 18 episode second season premiered on September 16, 2025. The third season is scheduled to premiere on January 5, 2027. A new special episode is scheduled to air on ABC and Disney+ on February 14, 2027, right after the Super Bowl LXI.

== Reception ==
=== Critical response ===
The series' first season holds a 96% approval rating on review aggregator Rotten Tomatoes, based on 25 critic reviews. The website's critics consensus reads, "With the ineffable Kaitlin Olson on hand to inject some spiky personality into a familiar formula, High Potential is a solid procedural with plenty of upside." Metacritic, which uses a weighted average, assigned a score of 72 out of 100 based on 16 critics, indicating "generally favorable".

Aramide Tinubu of Variety asserted that High Potential is a solid police procedural, praised Kaitlin Olson's performance, noting her ability to bring quirky charm to the role. Tinubu found the show's premise to be engaging, with Morgan's genius-level IQ and eccentricities offering a unique spin on the crime genre. Tinubu stated that while High Potential does not break new ground in the genre, it remains a perfectly adequate and formulaic watch. Tinubu appreciated the supporting cast, especially the chemistry between Olson and her co-stars, and highlighted the intriguing dynamic between Morgan and Detective Karadec.

Daniel Fienberg of The Hollywood Reporter said that High Potential is a show with a promising star but a shaky premise, praising Olson for her strong performance as Morgan. Fienberg found the exposition in the pilot, particularly Morgan's unsolicited revelation of her IQ, to be off-putting and distracting, noting it undermines the character's likability. He stated that the show struggles with its central premise, particularly around the question of how much Morgan's "high potential" actually contributes to solving cases, which leaves other characters feeling superfluous. Fienberg appreciated Olson's ability to ground the show and make the absurd moments enjoyable, but noted that the series as a whole is still finding its balance, with the chemistry between Olson and her co-stars, especially Daniel Sunjata, still developing. He concluded that while Olson represents the series' "high potential," the rest of the show needs to catch up.

The series' second season has a 100% approval rating on review aggregator Rotten Tomatoes based on 6 critic reviews. On Metacritic, the second season received a score of 75 out of 100 based on 6 critics, signifying "generally favorable".

=== Ratings ===
The premiere of High Potential saw a 220% increase in viewership, reaching 11.5 million viewers across platforms (including Hulu and Hulu on Disney+) within three days, from an initial 3.6 million on ABC alone. In the key 18-49 demographic, the rating rose by 354% (from 0.35 to 1.59) after 3 days of additional viewing across multiple streaming platforms. On Hulu, the series ranked in the Top 15 and held the No. 1 spot for three consecutive days starting September 22.

High Potential later became the most-watched new series on ABC in six years, surpassing The Conners' record from the 2018-2019 season. The October 22 episode was watched by 6.83 million viewers in Live + 7 Days metric, marking ABC's top spot in the Tuesday night scripted lineup for the first time in four years. After including streaming data from Hulu and Disney+, the episode's viewership rose to 10.49 million viewers - a 191% increase from its Live + Same Day ratings of 3.6 million, with steady viewership retention since the pilot.

Nielsen Media Research, which records streaming viewership on U.S. television screens, revealed that High Potential ranked as the No. 12 show of the fall among adults 18–49 in Nielsen live+7 ratings, with a 0.57 rating. Including seven days of streaming, the show rose to No. 1 in the demographic with a 2.33 rating, reflecting a 309% increase driven by its performance on Hulu. It also became the most-streamed broadcast entertainment series of the fall, with 4.3 million streaming viewers, which boosted its total viewership from 6.5 million in live+7 to 10.8 million across platforms, making it the third most-watched show in total viewers.

The January 14, 2025, episode of High Potential set a series high with 13.19 million cross-platform viewers over seven days and a 2.44 rating in the adults 18-49 demographic (about 3.27 million viewers). The episode also drew 9.14 million viewers in Nielsen's seven-day linear ratings. Streaming accounted for about 31% of the audience, with 4.05 million viewers, particularly skewing younger, with more than two-thirds of the 18-49 viewers (about 2.22 million people) watching via streaming. This performance marked the largest audience for an ABC drama in over four years, since Grey's Anatomy episodes in fall 2020. High Potential was the most-watched premiere on ABC's fall 2025 lineup, attracting 11.9 million multi-platform viewers within seven days of its debut. Including encore broadcasts, the total audience reached 15.9 million viewers, representing a 28% increase over the series' previous fall debut, which drew 9.3 million viewers during the same period.

==== Overall ====
Viewership and ratings per season of High Potential
Season	Timeslot (ET)	Episodes	First aired		Last aired		TV season	Viewership rank	Avg. viewers (millions)	18–49 rank	Avg. 18–49 rating
Season	Timeslot (ET)	Episodes	Date	Viewers (millions)	Date	Viewers (millions)	TV season	Viewership rank	Avg. viewers (millions)	18–49 rank	Avg. 18–49 rating
1	Tuesday 10:00 p.m. (1); Tuesday 10:01 p.m. (2–7); Tuesday 9:00 p.m. (8–13)	13	September 17, 2024	3.59	February 11, 2025	5.16	2024–25	2	16.14	1	3.85
2	Tuesday 10:00 p.m. (1–7); Tuesday 9:00 p.m. (8–18)	18	September 16, 2025	4.34	April 7, 2026	5.36	2025–26	3	16.00	1	3.35

==== Season 1 ====
Viewership and ratings per episode of High Potential
No.	Title	Air date	Rating/share (18–49)	Viewers (millions)	DVR (18–49)	DVR viewers (millions)	Total (18–49)	Total viewers (millions)	Ref.
1	"Pilot"	September 17, 2024	0.4/6	3.59	—N/a	—N/a	—N/a	—N/a	
2	"Dancers in the Dark"	September 24, 2024	0.3/5	3.68	—N/a	—N/a	—N/a	—N/a	
3	"Dirty Rotten Scoundrel"	October 8, 2024	0.3/5	3.78	—N/a	—N/a	—N/a	—N/a	
4	"Survival Mode"	October 15, 2024	0.3/4	3.36	0.26	3.28	0.59	6.60	
5	"Croaked"	October 22, 2024	0.3/4	3.60	0.27	3.23	0.56	6.83	
6	"Hangover"	October 29, 2024	0.3/3	3.09	0.31	3.41	0.56	6.50	
7	"One of Us"	November 12, 2024	0.3/4	3.36	0.29	3.40	0.54	6.77	
8	"Obsessed"	January 7, 2025	0.5/6	5.69	0.29	3.28	0.78	8.73	
9	"The RAMs"	January 14, 2025	0.5/6	5.79	0.28	3.29	0.77	9.08	
10	"Chutes and Murders"	January 21, 2025	0.5/6	5.75	0.27	3.17	0.74	8.91	
11	"The Sauna at the End of the Stairs"	January 28, 2025	0.4/5	4.77	0.20	3.11	0.63	7.88	
12	"Partners"	February 4, 2025	0.4/5	4.84	0.34	3.51	0.69	8.35	
13	"Let's Play"	February 11, 2025	0.4/6	5.16	0.32	3.45	0.75	8.61	

==== Season 2 ====
Viewership and ratings per episode of High Potential
No.	Title	Air date	Rating/share (18–49)	Viewers (millions)	DVR (18–49)	DVR viewers (millions)	Total (18–49)	Total viewers (millions)	Ref.
1	"Pawns"	September 16, 2025	0.3/7	4.34	0.24	3.63	0.59	7.98	
2	"Checkmate"	September 23, 2025	0.3/6	3.84	0.22	2.57	0.63	7.22	
3	"Eleven Minutes"	September 30, 2025	0.3/6	4.24	0.32	3.60	0.63	7.84	
4	"Behind the Music"	October 7, 2025	0.4/7	4.51	0.29	3.57	0.71	8.09	
5	"Content Warning"	October 14, 2025	0.3/6	4.15	0.33	3.41	0.65	7.56	
6	"Chasing Ghosts"	October 21, 2025	0.3/5	4.27	0.36	3.60	0.69	7.89	
7	"The One That Got Away"	October 28, 2025	0.3/4	4.02	0.30	3.16	0.57	7.17	
8	"The One That Got Away: Part Two"	January 6, 2026	0.3/5	5.65	TBD	TBD	TBD	TBD	
9	"Under the Rug"	January 13, 2026	0.4/6	5.70	TBD	TBD	TBD	TBD	
10	"Grounded"	January 20, 2026	0.4/6	5.93	TBD	TBD	TBD	TBD	
11	"NPC"	January 27, 2026	0.4/5	6.06	TBD	TBD	TBD	TBD	
12	"The Faust and the Furious"	February 3, 2026	0.4/5	5.91	TBD	TBD	TBD	TBD	
13	"In the Driver's Seat"	March 3, 2026	0.3/4	4.95	TBD	TBD	TBD	TBD	
14	"If You Come for the Queen"	March 10, 2026	0.3/4	5.02	TBD	TBD	TBD	TBD	
15	"Pie in the Sky"	March 17, 2026	0.3/3	5.28	TBD	TBD	TBD	TBD	
16	"Turn, Up the Heat"	March 24, 2026	0.3/4	5.17	TBD	TBD	TBD	TBD	
17	"Second Sunday"	March 31, 2026	0.3/4	5.26	TBD	TBD	TBD	TBD	
18	"Family Tree"	April 7, 2026	0.3/3	5.36	TBD	TBD	TBD	TBD	

=== Accolades ===
Accolades received by High Potential
Award	Date of ceremony	Category	Recipient(s)	Result	Ref.
Astra TV Awards	June 10, 2025	Best Actress in a Drama Series	Kaitlin Olson	Nominated	
Astra TV Awards	June 10, 2025	Best Supporting Actor in a Drama Series	Daniel Sunjata	Nominated	
Astra TV Awards	June 10, 2025	Best Cast Ensemble in a Broadcast Network Drama Series	High Potential	Nominated	
Astra TV Awards	June 10, 2025	Best Writing in a Drama Series	Drew Goddard, Nicolas Jean, and Stéphane Carrié (for "Pilot")	Nominated	
Astra TV Awards	August 15, 2026	Best Drama Series	High Potential	Nominated	
Astra TV Awards	August 15, 2026	Best Actress in a Drama Series	Kaitlin Olson	Nominated	
Astra TV Awards	August 15, 2026	Best Broadcast Network Drama Ensemble	High Potential	Nominated	
Astra TV Awards	August 15, 2026	Best Writing in a Drama Series	High Potential	Nominated	
Critics' Choice Super Awards	August 6, 2026	Best Action Series, Limited Series or Made-for-TV Movie	High Potential	Nominated	
Critics' Choice Super Awards	August 6, 2026	Best Actress in an Action Series, Limited Series or Made-for-TV Movie	Kaitlin Olson	Won	
Black Reel Awards	August 18, 2025	Outstanding Supporting Performance in a Drama Series	Daniel Sunjata	Nominated	
Saturn Awards	February 2, 2025	Best Action/Thriller Television Series	High Potential	Nominated	
