= List of Croatian films of the 1960s =

This is a list of the feature films produced in Croatia in the 1960s.

For an alphabetical list of articles on Croatian films see Category:Croatian films.

English title	Croatian title	Director(s)	Company	Main cast	Notes
1960
Point 905	Kota 905	Mate Relja	Jadran	Dušan Bulajić, Ilija Džuvalekovski, Hermina Pipinić, Stane Potokar	
The Ninth Circle	Deveti krug	France Štiglic	Jadran	Boris Dvornik, Dušica Žegarac, Beba Lončar	1960 Big Golden Arena winner, entered into the 1960 Cannes Film Festival
Atomic War Bride	Rat	Veljko Bulajić	Jadran	Antun Vrdoljak, Ewa Krzyszewska, Janez Vrhovec	
Signal Over the City	Signali nad gradom	Žika Mitrović	Jadran		
1961
Martin in the Clouds	Martin u oblacima	Branko Bauer	Jadran		
The King's New Clothes	Carevo novo ruho	Ante Babaja	Zora		
	Pustolov pred vratima	Šime Šimatović	Jadran		
	Sreća dolazi u 9	Nikola Tanhofer	Jadran		
	Sudar na paralelama	Jože Babič	Jadran		
	Potraga za zmajem	Jane Kavčič	Jadran		
Alphabet of Fear	Abeceda straha	Fadil Hadžić	Jadran		
	Veliko suđenje	Fedor Škubonja	Zora		
	Igre na skelama	Srećko Weygand	Zora		
1962
	Šeki snima, pazi se	Marijan Vajda	Jadran		
	Sjenka slave	Vanja Bjenjaš	Jadran		
Did a Good Man Die?	Da li je umro dobar čovjek?	Fadil Hadžić	Jadran		
	Rana jesen	Toma Janić	Jadran		
1963
	Opasni put	Mate Relja	Jadran		
Double Circle	Dvostruki obruč	Nikola Tanhofer	Jadran		
The Man in the Photograph	Čovjek sa fotografije	Vladimir Pogačić	Jadran		
Thundering Mountains	Nevesinjska puška	Žika Mitrović	Jadran		
Face to Face	Licem u lice	Branko Bauer	Jadran		1963 Big Golden Arena winner
1964
	Svanuće	Nikola Tanhofer	Jadran		
	Pravo stanje stvari	Vladan Slijepčević	Jadran		
	Nikoletina Bursać	Branko Bauer	Jadran		
Prometheus of the Island	Prometej s otoka Viševice	Vatroslav Mimica	Jadran		1965 Big Golden Arena winner
1965
The Key	Ključ	Vanča Kljaković; Krsto Papić; Antun Vrdoljak	Jadran		
	Doći i ostati	Branko Bauer	Jadran / Avala		
Back of the Medal	Druga strana medalje	Fadil Hadžić	Jadran		
	Čovik od svita	Obrad Gluščević	Jadran		
1966
Looking Into the Eyes of the Sun	Pogled u zjenicu sunca	Veljko Bulajić	Jadran		
The Seventh Continent	Sedmi kontinent	Dušan Vukotić	Jadran / Studio Koliba		
Monday or Tuesday	Ponedjeljak ili utorak	Vatroslav Mimica	Jadran		1966 Big Golden Arena winner
Rondo	Rondo	Zvonimir Berković	Jadran		
1967
The Birch Tree	Breza	Ante Babaja	Jadran		
Protest	Protest	Fadil Hadžić	Most / Viba		
Fourth Companion	Četvrti suputnik	Branko Bauer	FRZ / OHIS		
Kaya	Kaja, ubit ću te!	Vatroslav Mimica	Jadran		
Illusion	Iluzija	Krsto Papić	Jadran		
Black Birds	Crne ptice	Eduard Galić	Most / Viba		
1968
Three Hours to Love	Tri sata za ljubav	Fadil Hadžić	Jadran		
Gravitation	Gravitacija	Branko Ivanda	Jadran		
	Goli čovik	Obrad Gluščević	Jadran		
I Have Two Mothers and Two Fathers	Imam dvije mame i dva tate	Krešo Golik	Jadran		
1969
When You Hear the Bells	Kad čuješ zvona	Antun Vrdoljak	FRZ / CFRZ		Entered into the 6th Moscow International Film Festival
An Event	Događaj	Vatroslav Mimica	Jadran		
Sunday	Nedjelja	Lordan Zafranović	FAS		
Accidental Life	Slučajni život	Ante Peterlić	FAS		
Battle of Neretva	Bitka na Neretvi	Veljko Bulajić	UJP / Igor / Eichberg		
Wild Angels	Divlji anđeli	Fadil Hadžić	Jadran		
Love and Some Swear Words	Ljubav i poneka psovka	Antun Vrdoljak	Croatia		
Handcuffs	Lisice	Krsto Papić	Jadran		1970 Big Golden Arena winner
