= Black Birds (film) =

- Crne ptice
- Directed by: Eduard Galić
- Written by: Eduard Galić; Grga Gamulin; Zoran Tadic
- Story by: Grgo Gamulin
- Starring: Vojislav Miric; Fabijan Sovagovic; Ivan Subic
- Cinematography: Mile de Gleria
- Edited by: Boris Tešija
- Music by: Anđelko Klobučar
- Distributed by: Viba Film
- Release date: July 18, 1967 (Yugoslavia)
- Running time: 92 minutes
- Country: Yugoslavia
- Language: Serbo-Croatian

Black Birds (Crne ptice) is a 1967 Yugoslavian war drama film directed by Eduard Galić.

The original idea and script were by Grgo Gamulin. Zoran Tadić was the scenario assistant. The original music was composed by Anđelko Klobučar. The cinematography was by Mile de Gleria. The film editing was by Boris Tešija. The production design was by Branko Hundić.

== Plot ==
The film is a story about a group of prisoners in the Ustasha-run Stara Gradiška concentration camp that takes place during the final days of World War II. The Ustashas plan to transport the prisoners to a bridge, which they will blow up. At the same time, Partisan troops are closing in on the camp, and the prisoners themselves are hatching a plot to save their lives...

== Cast ==
- Voja Mirić
- Fabijan Šovagović
- Ivan Šubić
- Ivo Serdar
- Vanja Drach
- Rade Šerbedžija (uncredited)
- Relja Bašić
- Iva Marjanović
- Ivica Katić
- Ratko Buljan
- Pavle Bogdanović
- Nikola Gec
- Antun Vrdoljak
- Špiro Guberina
- Uglješa Kojadinović

== Background and production ==
By the time Eduard Galić set out to direct Black Birds, his debut feature film, he was already an established television director and an author of award-winning documentaries. He developed an interest in a screenplay written by Grgo Gamulin, Galić's former father-in-law, that drew heavily on his personal experiences in World War II. As a long-time leftist, Gamulin spent the entire war imprisoned by the regime of the Independent State of Croatia. Facing the threat of imminent execution, on 17 April 1945 he managed to escape from the train transporting the prisoners from Lepoglava to Stara Gradiška.

Galić secured funding for the film and, after negotiations with Jadran Film fell through, he and Fadil Hadžić founded Most, an independent production collective. The arrangements were made to produce Black Birds and Hadžić's Protest in partnership with Viba Film, a Slovene production company.

Galić's work on the screenplay created a conflict with Gamulin. While the Gamulin's original work was a straightforward action drama, Galić preferred the then highly influential auteur film. Together with Zoran Tadić, the assistant director, and Petar Krelja, Galić developed a new outline of the film in which three central characters were a psalm-quoting Ustasha lieutenant (Šovagović), an engineer tasked with blowing up the bridge (Mirić), and an enigmatic prisoner (Šerbedžija, in his first major film role). Gamulin felt that the new version of the screenplay had nothing to do with his original, and asked for his name to be removed from the credits. In the end, Gamulin was credited for the story, while the screenplay credits were omitted entirely.

== Reception ==
In its premiere, Black Birds was relegated to the out-of-competition section of the 1967 Pula Film Festival, and received very little attention. The film's release coincided with the creative zenith of Yugoslav modernist cinema, and it was largely overshadowed by other entries that included Aleksandar Petrović's I Even Met Happy Gypsies, Puriša Đorđević's The Morning, and Ante Babaja's The Birch Tree. Galić was disappointed by his film's failure, and the only modest consolation for him was an extra fee that he received due to Black Birds being distributed in the Soviet Union. Reminiscing in 2019 on his personal feelings towards the film, Galić described them as a "love-and-hate relationship", since he had felt its exclusion from the Pula Film Festival as a "big blow" and a threat to his career.

The film was virtually forgotten until it was screened at the 2010 Subversive Festival in Zagreb. On this occasion, the Croatian film critic Nenad Polimac called Black Birds "the most interesting discovery of the festival" and a "sensation", praising its visual qualities and expressiveness. Other Croatian critics shared this view: Damir Radić described the film as a "masterful amalgamation of art and genre", while Tomislav Šakić noted it is "possibly the best [directorial] debut in the history of Croatian cinema".

In 2012, the film was digitally restored by the Croatian and Slovene Film Archives.
