= Jure Krišto =

Croatian historian

Jure G. Krišto
- Born: 29 March 1943 (age 83); Stipanići, Tomislavgrad, Independent State of Croatia (modern-day Bosnia and Herzegovina)

Academic background
- Education: University of Notre Dame; University of Zagreb
- Thesis: Katolička crkva u hrvatskoj politici 1850.–1918. (1993)

Academic work
- Discipline: Religious studies History
- Institutions: Croatian Institute of History

Jure G. Krišto (born 29 March 1943) is a Croatian historian and religious scholar. From 1992 to 2000, he served as the editor of the Journal of Contemporary History, a publication of the Croatian Institute of History in Zagreb. His work focuses primarily on Croatian history and politics, with an emphasis on the Catholic Church in Croatia. In 2016, he was named to a papal commission studying the life of the controversial wartime Archbishop of Zagreb, Aloysius Stepinac. Several scholars, including Slavko and Ivo Goldstein, Vjekoslav Perica, Neven Budak and Paul Mojzes, among others, have criticized Krišto's works and accused him of minimizing and relativizing the atrocities committed by the Ustaše movement in the Independent State of Croatia (NDH), an Axis puppet state that existed during World War II.

== Biography ==
Krišto was born on 29 March 1943 in the village of Stipanići near Tomislavgrad, Bosnia and Herzegovina. He received his master's degree at the University of Ottawa. In 1979, he received a doctorate in theology at the University of Notre Dame. After ten years spent lecturing in the United States, he returned to Croatia in 1991, amidst the breakup of Yugoslavia. That year, he joined the Croatian Institute of History (Croatian: Hrvatski institut za povijest) in Zagreb, which in the words of historian Neven Budak, became "a center of historical revisionism" following Croatia's independence. In 1993, he received his second doctorate from the University of Zagreb's Faculty of Humanities and Social Sciences. From 1992 to 2000, he served as the editor of the Journal of Contemporary History. His work focuses primarily on Croatian history and politics, as well as the role of the Catholic Church in Croatia. He is a member of the American Academy of Religion, the American Association for the Advancement of Slavic Studies and the Catholic Theological Society of America.

In 2016, Krišto was named to a papal commission established by Pope Francis examining the life of the Archbishop of Zagreb Aloysius Stepinac, who after World War II was convicted of collaboration by a Yugoslav court and later died under house arrest. The Catholic Church in Croatia has long pushed for Stepinac to be canonized and declared a saint, which has been met with opposition from the Government of Serbia and the Serbian Orthodox Church, as well as the Ecumenical Patriarch Bartholomew of Constantinople.

== Reception ==
Krišto has been described as a revisionist historian by the scholar Annamaria Orla-Bukowska. Budak has described him as "a representative of the ideology of those Croatian emigrants who judged the situation in the country from a distant and extremely anti-communist perspective" and "a symbol of unprofessional and nationalistic historiography." The historian Vjekoslav Perica writes that Krišto was among the "many propagandists and patriotic scholars" who "took part in this kind of "defense" of Croatia by a systematic production of lies." The scholars Slavko and Ivo Goldstein, the former a Holocaust survivor and the latter his son, have written that "Krišto's books provide the most thorough attempt to refute some of the previously dominant theses and reshape the opinion about the criminal character" of the NDH. A positive review of Krišto's work has come from the author William Doino Jr, a defender of Pope Pius XII's actions during World War II, who has described Krišto as the "leading expert on wartime Croatia" and written that his works "serve as a corrective to the anti-Croat propaganda often found in the West."

Krišto has argued that the widespread anti-Serb atrocities the Ustaše committed in 1941 were "small-scale sporadic incidents" provoked by "rebellious and violent Serbs" who refused to accept the legitimacy of the German occupation and the Croatian puppet state. He has also denied that the NDH pursued a systematic policy of forcibly converting Serbs to Roman Catholicism, and has argued that there is no evidence of the Catholic Church's involvement except, as he states, in instances where conversions were necessary to protect Serbs from the Ustaše. In contrast, most scholars agree that the NDH pursued a deliberate policy of forced conversion. Krišto's statement that the conversions were meant to "dissuade the Orthodox population in the Croatian areas from centuries of anti-Croatian activity" prompted the historian Tomislav Dulić to accuse him of victim blaming. Referring to Krišto's argument that conversions had taken place because the NDH government "confused the jurisdiction of the state with that of the Church", Dulić remarked, "it is nonsensical to claim that the Ustashe became involved in the conversions by accident." The scholar Paul Mojzes has accused Krišto of obfuscating the nature of the conversions "in order to declare his Catholic Church innocent of any wrongdoing," and notes that his "findings leave unanswered why such large numbers of applicants for forced conversion from Serbian Orthodoxy to Catholicism did not also happen before or after World War II."

In a 2002 review of Slavko and Ivo Goldstein's Holokaust u Zagrebu ("The Holocaust in Zagreb"), Krišto denied that the city's Jews were victims of The Holocaust on the grounds that the majority were killed "elsewhere in Croatia, as well as outside of Croatia". In turn, the Goldsteins have accused him of making "no attempt to hide his desire to decrease the number of Jewish victims and thus decrease the magnitude of the Ustasha genocide of the Jews," and of reaching conclusions about the scope and severity of Ustaše atrocities by distorting or misconstruing the work of other researchers, such as Vladimir Žerjavić, adding that "Krišto's firm demands for "re-evaluation" are either a hasty excursion into material that he does not know well enough, or will not analyze more deeply, or an attempt to score easy and petty political points." Although Krišto concedes that the Ustaše instituted anti-Semitic measures, he adds that this was typical in Axis-occupied countries. Additionally, he has argued that high-ranking Ustaše officials, including dictator Ante Pavelić, protected Jews due to familial ties, asserting that Pavelić's wife was Jewish—a claim which the Goldsteins have deemed "pure fabrication".

Krišto has argued that, unlike the Serbian Orthodox Church, the Catholic Church in Croatia has "a more reconciling, ecumenical posture". This assertion has been challenged by Mojzes. Krišto has also described Stepinac as "the greatest defender of Jews, not only in the [NDH], but in the whole of Europe." This characterization has been disputed by the Goldsteins, who have described it as the instance when "Krišto's revisionism peaked". Writing about Krišto's 1998 book Katolička crkva i Nezavisna Država Hrvatska: 1941.–1945. ("The Catholic Church and the Independent State of Croatia, 1941–1945"), the scholar Pål Kolstø criticizes Krišto for ignoring that certain leading members of the Catholic Church in Croatia were Ustaše sympathizers and abetted their atrocities, noting that he makes no mention of the fact that the Archbishop of Sarajevo, Ivan Šarić, had been a member of the Ustaše since 1934.

== Selected bibliography ==
- Prešućena povijest: Katolička crkva u hrvatskoj politici 1850.–1918. Zagreb, Croatia: Hrvatska sveučilišna naklada (1994). ISBN 978-953-169-046-1
- Katolička crkva u totalitarizmu: 1945.–1990. Zagreb, Croatia: Nakladni zavor Globus (1997). ISBN 978-9-5316-7081-4
- Katolička crkva i Nezavisna Država Hrvatska: 1941.–1945. Zagreb, Croatia: Hrvatski institut za povijest (1998). ISBN 978-9-53649-118-6
- Sukob simbola: politika, vjere i ideologije u Nezavisnoj Državi Hrvatskoj. Zagreb, Croatia: Globus (2001). ISBN 978-9-5316-7133-0
- Hrvatski katolički pokret: 1903.–1945. Zagreb, Croatia: Glas Koncila (2004). ISBN 978-9-5363-2441-5
- Stoljeće služenja Bogu, Redu i narodu: Kongregacija sestara dominikanki Sv. anđela čuvara. Zagreb, Croatia: Hrvatski institut za povijest (2005). ISBN 978-9-536-3245-14
- Riječ je o Bosni. Zagreb, Croatia: Golden Marketing (2008). ISBN 978-953-212-298-5
