= Branko Špoljar =

Croatian actor

- Born: 5 January 1914; Zagreb, Austro-Hungary
- Died: 27 October 1985 (aged 71); Zagreb, Yugoslavia
- Occupation: Actor
- Years active: 1944-1982

Branko Špoljar (5 January 1914 - 27 October 1985) was a Yugoslav actor. He appeared in more than thirty films from 1944 to 1982.

== Filmography ==
Year	Title	Role	Notes
1944	Lisinski	Vatroslav Lisinski	
1954	Koncert	Edmund Glojzner	
1956	Lum and Abner Abroad	Papa Passavetz	
1956	Don't Look Back, My Son	Brkic	
1960	Signal Over the City	Doktor Vukovic	
1962	Kozara	Njemacki kapetan	
1962	Treasure of Silver Lake	Doc Jefferson Hartley	
1963	Apache Gold	Bancroft	
1964	Pravo stanje stvari		
1965	The Key	Lijecnik	(segment "Cekati")
1966	Monday or Tuesday	Muz Markove ljubavnice	
1966	Winnetou and the Crossbreed	Doc	Uncredited
1967	Cetvrti suputnik		
1968	Adriatic Sea of Fire	Un officier	
1968	The Valley of Death	Cranfield	
1969	When You Hear the Bells	Komandant bataljona	
1969	Accidental Life	Direktor	
1969	The Ravine	Thin Soldier	Uncredited
1969	Delitto al circolo del tennis		
1970	Handcuffs	Ucitelj	
1971	Sacco & Vanzetti	Psychiatrist	Uncredited
1971	Ovcar	Drug iz opcine	
1971	Romance of a Horsethief	Strugatch	
1972	Vuk samotnjak	Doktor	
1973	Little Mother		
1973	The Battle of Sutjeska	Clan glavnog staba	
1973	The Bloody Vultures of Alaska	Doc	
1976	The Rat Savior	Rupcic	
1977	Operation Stadium	Ravnatelj gimnazije	
1979	Slow Motion		
1980	The Secret of Nikola Tesla		
2009	Ante Pavelic Bez Maske	Himself	
