= Agram, die Hauptstadt Kroatiens =

- Directed by: Oktavijan Miletić
- Written by: Alois König
- Produced by: Alfred Merwick
- Cinematography: Oktavijan Miletić
- Edited by: Oktavijan Miletić
- Production company: Tobis Film
- Release date: 1943
- Running time: 9 minutes
- Countries: Germany; Independent State of Croatia

Agram, die Hauptstadt Kroatiens (Croatian: Zagreb, glavni grad Hrvatske, lit. 'Zagreb, capital of Croatia') is a short documentary film directed by Oktavijan Miletić in 1943 in the Independent State of Croatia. It was produced for Tobis Film in Germany and showed cultural activities in Zagreb, as well as the main monuments of the city. The film was rediscovered in 2008, after being considered lost for more than 60 years.

The film was first announced in September 1941 and was due to appear in theaters by the end of that year. Jakov Gotovac was scheduled to compose the music. However, the editing was completed only in 1943 and, for reasons unknown, narration and music were never made. It appears that the production company lost interest in the documentary, while Miletić was by that time preoccupied with Lisinski (1944), his feature film debut. The unfinished film was sent to the German Reichsfilmarchiv in Berlin.

After the fall of Nazi Germany, the film came into the possession of the Soviet Union which confiscated the archive, along with the documentation. In 1990, the film material was returned to the Bundesfilmarchiv. However, the film had been misfiled as Pressburg, die Hauptstadt Slowakei (Bratislava, the Capital of Slovakia), and remained unknown until 2008, when Croatian film archivist Daniel Rafaelić discovered it in the archive.

The restored film premiered at, and opened, the 2008 Zagreb Film Festival.

== Sources ==
- Rafaelić, Daniel (2004). "Filmološko istraživanje u bečkom filmskom arhivu 2004" (PDF). Arhivski vjesnik. 47 (1). Croatian State Archives: 173–176.
- Rafaelić, Daniel (2010). "Agram die Hauptstadt Kroatiens Oktavijana Miletića" (PDF). Hrvatski filmski ljetopis (in Croatian). 16 (62). Zagreb: Croatian Film Association: 101–103.
