= Frano Vodopivec =

Croatian cinematographer

- Born: 4 July 1924; Zagreb, Kingdom of Yugoslavia
- Died: 13 March 1998 (aged 73); Zagreb, Croatia
- Occupation: Cinematographer
- Years active: 1952–1977

Frano Vodopivec (4 July 1924 – 13 March 1998) was a Croatian cinematographer.

== Background ==
Vodopivec first began working with film and photography in high school and during World War II he worked at Hrvatski slikopis, the state-sponsored film company which produced propaganda shorts for the short-lived fascist regime of the Independent State of Croatia. After the war he worked on newsreels, before joining Jadran Film production company, for whom he shot his first short feature in 1947 and his first feature film in 1952 (U oluji, directed by Vatroslav Mimica).

His second feature was The Girl and the Oak (1955, directed by Krešo Golik), which won him the Golden Arena for Best Cinematography at the 1955 Pula Film Festival, the Yugoslav national film awards. Vodopivec went on to work with a number of renowned Croatian directors in the following decades, including Fadil Hadžić and Antun Vrdoljak, and he won his second Golden Arena in 1969, for Hadžić's An Event and Vrdoljak's When You Hear the Bells.

Along with Oktavijan Miletić, he is considered the first cinematographer in Croatian cinema whose work highlighted the importance of cinematography in the overall aesthetic quality of film. His last feature film was Fliers of the Open Skies (Letači velikog neba, 1977) and he retired from filmmaking in the early 1980s. Vodopivec was also awarded the Vladimir Nazor Award for Life Achievement in 1989, the highest Croatian national award for arts.

== Selected filmography ==
- The Girl and the Oak (Djevojka i hrast, 1955; directed by Krešo Golik)
- Kaya (Kaja, ubit ću te!, 1967; directed by Vatroslav Mimica)
- Three Hours to Love (Tri sata za ljubav, 1968; directed by Fadil Hadžić)
- When You Hear the Bells (Kad čuješ zvona, 1969; directed by Antun Vrdoljak)
- An Event (Događaj, 1969; directed by Vatroslav Mimica)
- Passing Days (Idu dani, 1970; directed by Fadil Hadžić)
- The Fed One (Hranjenik, 1970; directed by Vatroslav Mimica)
- There Grows a Green Pine in the Woods (U gori raste zelen bor, 1971; directed by Antun Vrdoljak)
- Eagle in a Cage (1972, directed by Fielder Cook)
- Fliers of the Open Skies (Letači velikog neba, 1977; directed by Marijan Arhanić)
