= Delusion (1998 film) =

1998 Croatian film by Zeljko Senecic

Delusion Croat: Zavaravanje
- Directed by: Zeljko Senecic
- Written by: Zeljko Senecic
- Starring: Slobodan Dimitrijevic; Jagoda Kaloper; Filip Sovagovic; Sandra Loncaric
- Cinematography: Enes Midzic
- Edited by: Kruno Kusec
- Music by: Arsen Dedic
- Production company: Patria Film
- Distributed by: Hrvatska Radiotelevizija
- Release date: 1998
- Country: Croatia
- Language: Serbo-Croatian

Delusion (Croatian: Zavaravanje for Pretense or Faking) is a 1998 Croatian crime-drama film directed by Zeljko Senecic.

== Plot ==
Joža (Božidar Orešković), a middle-aged professional driver, offers Stella (Sandra Lončarić), a young and attractive prostitute, a ride from Zadar to Zagreb. Joža remembers his traumatic war experiences and his son who returned from combat with a severe disability. Underneath her seemingly cold and calculated demeanor, Stella is also a grieving parent. During the ride, the two develop a special relationship.

== Cast ==
- Slobodan Dimitrijevic
- Jagoda Kaloper
- Filip Sovagovic
- Sandra Lončarić
- Bozidar Oreskovic
- Tatjana Bertok
- Ivan Marevich
- Suzana Nikolic

== Reception ==
=== Awards and nominations ===
The film won Sandra Lončarić the Golden Arena for Best Actress at the 1998 Pula Film Festival.
