= Elly Bašić =

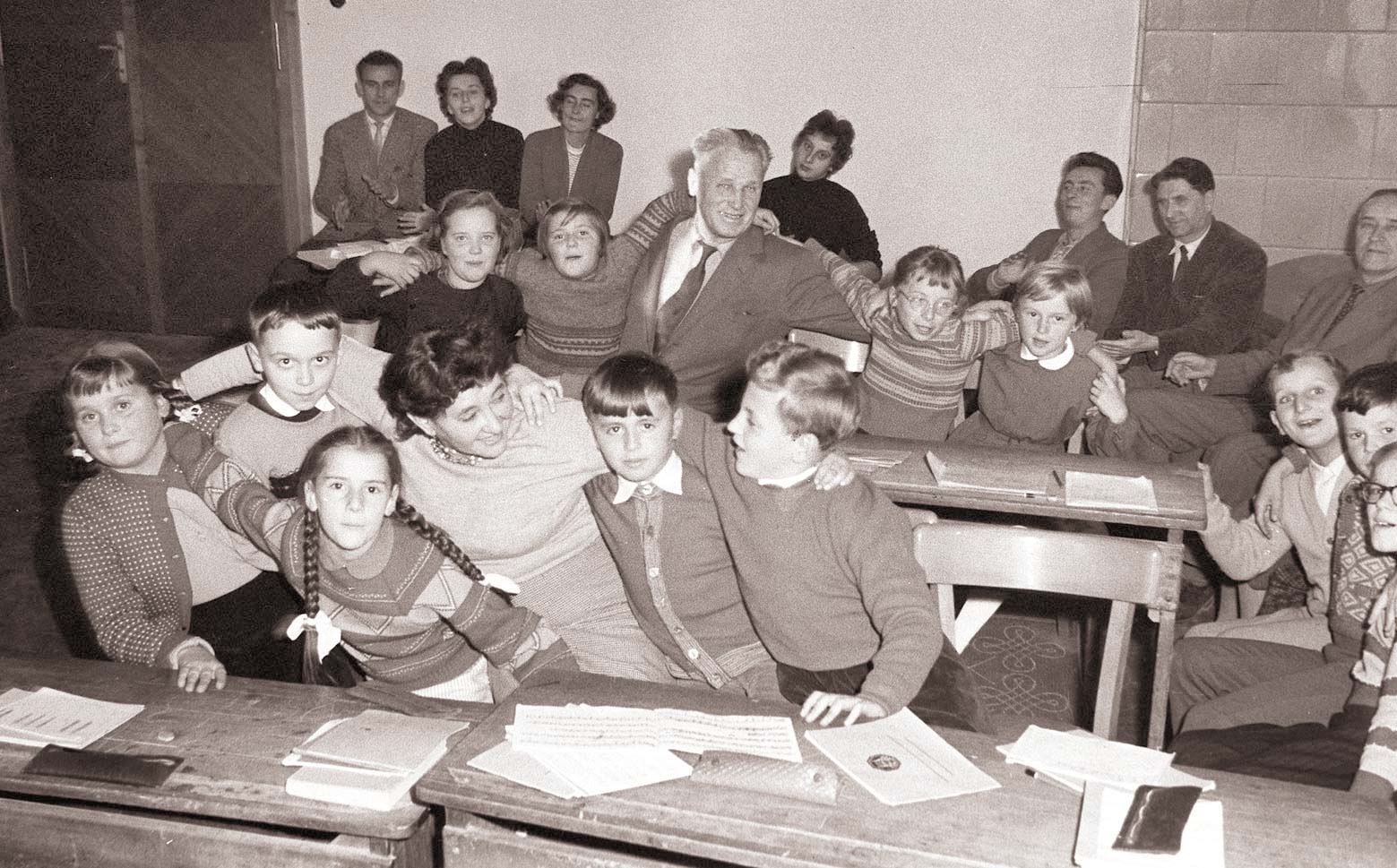
- Music lessons at VI. Maribor primary school. Elly Bašić is on the first row. 1959.
- Born: Gabriela Lerch; 3 August 1908; Zagreb, Kingdom of Croatia-Slavonia, Austro-Hungarian Empire
- Died: 25 February 1998 (aged 89); Zagreb, Croatia
- Occupations: Pianist and music pedagogue
- Known for: Teaching method
- Spouses: Ivo Prišlin; Mladen Bašić
- Children: Relja Bašić

Gabriela "Elly" Lerch Bašić (Zagreb, September 3, 1908 – Zagreb, February 25, 1998) was a Croatian music teacher and pianist.

== Early life ==
Elly Bašić was born in Zagreb on September 3, 1908, in a Jewish family, to Rikard and Dorotea Lerch. Her father became director-general of Croatian Post. She had one brother, Ivan. She graduated in piano at the Zagreb Academy of Music and studied composition and conducting.

== Career ==
In 1929, she founded the Beethoven Experimental School of Music with her first husband Ivo Prišlin, where she remained until 1945 and taught piano and music theory. She also taught piano and theoretical subjects at the City Music School in Zagreb. She worked as an assistant at the Zagreb Academy of Music, lecturer at the Theater Academy in Zagreb, and assistant professor at the Sarajevo Music Academy. For many years, she was a permanent external associate of the Institute of Ethnology and Folklore Research in Zagreb. In 1965, she founded the Functional Music School, which became known as the Elly Bašić Music School.

=== Pedagogy ===
For decades, Bašić dealt with the topic of creativity in children as a natural gift and the possibility of maintaining and developing that creativity in youth and adults. She argued that actions like lullabies, nursery rhymes, games, chants, sports cheering and mother musical-speech-motor elements influenced positively the expression of children and adults alike, especially emotionally inhibited children and children with disabilities. This domain was termed Functional Music Pedagogy (FMP). It became devoted to music education to help child's personality development through music. She claimed that every child had a music ear and rhythm, which were instrumental in the development of their creativity.

Bašić presented her research in a series of thirty papers at scientific conferences in Yugoslavia and abroad, and a particularly famous and successful exhibition named "Musical Expression of the Child", which was set at the UNESCO office in Geneva in 1955. Her textbook Sedam nota sto divota (Seven Notes and a Hundred Wonders) was published in 18 editions over the course of 18 years, and was a bestseller in the field of music-pedagogy in Croatia during that time.

== Personal life ==
She married the pianist and composer Ivo Prišlin in 1929, with whom she had a son, the Croatian actor Relja Bašić. The marriage was short-lived because she discovered an affair her husband was having with a student. She married the conductor and pianist Mladen Bašić, who adopted her son Relja; it is said that her marriage saved her from the Ustaše regime during World War II.

== Death ==
Bašić died on February 25, 1998, in Zagreb. She is buried at the Mirogoj City Cemetery in Zagreb.
