= Tito Strozzi =

Tito Strozzi may refer to:

- Tito Vespasiano Strozzi (1424–c. 1505), Italian poet
- Tito Strozzi (actor) (1892–1970), Croatian actor and writer, star of the film Baroque in Croatia
