= Jagoda Kaloper =

Croatian painter and actress (1947–2016)

Jagoda Kaloper (19 June 1947 – 1 October 2016) was a Croatian visual artist, filmmaker, and actress known for various roles in films in the Yugoslav cinema.

== Biography ==
Born in Zagreb, Yugoslavia Jagoda Kaloper made her screen debut in the 1965 film Ključ, without any previous acting experience. She continued to appear in many different films, including 1966 drama Monday or Tuesday directed by Vatroslav Mimica, and Krsto Papić's 1969 drama Handcuffs. However, she was best known internationally for her role in Dušan Makavejev's 1971 film WR: Mysteries of the Organism.

Parallel to her acting career, Jagoda Kaloper was also an author and artist. She graduated from the Zagreb Academy of Fine Arts in 1970 when she also became a member of the Croatian Association of Artists. In the same year, she exhibited her work in her first (solo) exhibition in SC (Studentski Centar) Gallery in Zagreb under the name Neimenovani ambijent ("Unnamed Ambient"). In 1971, she did several exhibitions, mostly in the field of performance, public artistic actions, and happenings. For instance, she exhibited her work Bez naslova ("Untitled") in Karlovac in the group exhibition Guliver u Zemlji Čudesa ("Guliver in Wonderland"), curated by Želimir Košćević. In 1973, sve participated in group exhibition Documents on Post-Object Phenomena in Yugoslav Art 1968–1973 in Museum of Contemporary Art in Belgrade. In 1978, she participated in New Tendencies group exhibition in Museum of Contemporary Art Zagreb. In 1981, as a part of project to reanimate Tkalčićeva street in downtown Zagreb organized by the 16th Zagrebački Salon ("Zagreb Salon"), she did an art project Pogled iznutra i izvana: Ružičaste naočale "A View from the Inside and from the Outside: Pink Glasses"). In 1987, she did a solo, multimedia exhibition under the title Karbonizacija ("Karbonization") in SC (Studentski Centar) Gallery in Zagreb. From the early 1990s, she did several other solo exhibitions, primarily of paintings and jewelry. For instance, she did a series of paintings for a gallery in Viennese hotel Kaiserhoff in 1995, solo exhibition under the title Plavo i rozo ("Blue and Pink") in 2000 in gallery Adum on Croatian island of Zlarin.

During her artistic career, she also created graphic design for various magazines, books, catalogues, posters, as well as many visual identities for different exhibitions and events. For example, in 1979, she redesigned Gordogan magazine. Also, in 1982, when she became a graphic designer in Croatian publishing house - Školska knjiga ("A School's Book"), she designed and illustrated a book and vinyl of a radio show Tonkica Palonkica frrr by Mladen Kušec. In 1983 she did a graphic solution for the monography Lenjin ("Lenin"), published by Niro radničke novine ("Niro workers' press). In 1984, she designed promotional material and curated exhibition Marx i stoljeće marksizma ("Marx and the century of Marxism") in National library in Zagreb. In 1986, she designed and illustrated children's book Jooj! written by Mladen Kušec.

In later years, she occasionally appeared in smaller film and television roles, but preferring to pursue her art career, mostly in the field of painting, sculpture and film.

In 2010, Jagoda Kaloper has written and directed her first art film Žena u ogledalu ("Woman in the Mirror"). It is a collage of clips from films she had played in from the 1960s until recently and frames of herself in everyday life, which she made with a hand-held digital camera on reflective surfaces. The result is a multi-layered work on identity, youth, aging, and being a woman in different times and sociopolitical systems. In 2011, the film was acquired by the Museum of Contemporary Art in Zagreb. It was shown at Pula Film Festival and I Mille Occhi at Trieste Film Festival.

In 2013, art historian Leonida Kovač published a bilingual book about Jagoda's movie under the title U zrcalu kulturalnog ekrana: Jagoda Kaloper In the Mirror of the Cultural Screen: Jagoda Kaloper (ISBN 978-953-7033-40-8)

Jagoda Kaloper was married to an architect Radovan Tajder with whom she had one daughter, author Ana Tajder.

She died in Vienna on 1 October 2016.

== Awards ==
During her career, she won multiple awards in different art fields. For her graphic solution of the monography Lenjin ("Lenin"), she won award on Belgrade Book Fair in 1983. In 1986, she won award "Ivana Brlić Mažuranić" for the best illustrated children's book. In 2011, the film won the first award at the competition T-HT i MSU and was acquired by the Museum of Contemporary Art in Zagreb.

== Filmography ==
- The Key (1965)
- Monday or Tuesday (1966)
- Gravitation (1968)
- Plavi svijet (short 1969)
- Handcuffs (1970)
- Fabijen (TV movie 1971)
- Balada o svirepom... (1971)
- Apotekarica (TV short 1971)
- WR: Mysteries of the Organism (1971)
- Whichever Way the Ball Bounces (1974)
- The House (1975)
- The Last Mission of Demolitions Man Cloud (1978)
- Ponedjeljak (short 1980)
- Trophy (1981)
- The Melody Haunts My Memory (1981)
- Ana i Nives (1982)
- Mondo Bobo (1997)
- Delusion (1998)
- The Miroslav Holding Co. (2001)
- The Society of Jesus (2004)
- Kravata (2005)
- Happy Birthday Marija (2009)
- Beyond the Mirror (2010) (Writer and director)

== Work in art ==
- First solo exhibition in Gallery SC, Zagreb (1970)
- Group exhibition "Mogucnosti za 71." in Gallery of Contemporary Art, Zagreb (1971)
- Group exhibition "Guliver u zemlji cudesa" in the Town Gallery, Karovac (1971)
- Solo exhibition "Mirna3", Motovun (1972)
- Proposal "Tkalciceva" on Zagreb Salon (1981)
- Proposal "Mostovi" on Zagreb Salon (1982)
- Group Exhibition "Likumova generacija"(1984)
- Solo exhibition "Karbonizacija" in SC, Zagreb (1987)
- Group exhibition in Novi Dvori, Zapresic (1987)
- Group exhibition "Dubrovnik – Partei der Toten" in Das Kunsthaus Kampfnagel, Hamburg (1992)
- Created a cycle of paintings for Hotel Moran, Prague (1992)
- Exhibited on Zagreb Salon (1993)
- Created a cycle of paintings for Hotel Satori, Gmunden (1993)
- Grant "Ars America USA" and exhibition in Ruttgers Centre for Innovative printing (1994)
- Created a cycle of paintings for Hotel Wimberger, Vienna and Casino Baden (1994)
- Solo exhibition in Hotel Kaiserhof and Hotel Regina, Vienna (1995)
- Solo exhibition "Plavo i roza" in Gallery Adum, Zlarin (2000)
- Solo exhibition "Koralji" in Gallery Adum, Zlarin (2004)
- Series of portraits of members of charity organisation "Oesterreich Hilft", Vienna (2004)
- International group exhibition "ZGRAF9", Zagreb (2004)
- Opened her own gallery on the island Zlarin, including the permanent exhibition of her work (2007)
- Group exhibition "Revolution 1968", Zaccheta National Gallery of Art, Warsowi (2008)
- Solo exhibition in gallery "Kapetanova kula", Zadar (2008)
- Group exhibition "T-HT nagrada" Museum of Contemporary Art, Zagreb (2011)
- Solo exhibition "Sto se dogodilo Wilhelmu Reichu?", Salon Galic, Split (2014)
- Solo exhibition "Bulevar sumraka", Museum of Contemporary Art, Zagreb (2015)
