= Kojadinović =

Kojadinović (Serbian Cyrillic: Којадиновић, pronounced [kojadǐːnoʋitɕ]) is a Serbian surname, eponymous to the ancestral first name and made with the typical Serbian patronymic productive suffix "-ović" from the now obsolete, archaic male first (personal) name Kojadin, itself a variant of Konstantin (Constantine) through the hypocoristic Koja (which also gives family names such as Kojić, Kojović, and Kojanović) + -din (cf. Serbian personal names Stojadin, Miladin, Obradin, Živadin etc.).

It may refer to:

- Feliks Kojadinović
- Dragan Kojadinović
- Miodrag Kojadinović
- Uglješa Kojadinović
