= Relja Bašić =

Croatian actor

- Born: 14 February 1930; Zagreb, Kingdom of Yugoslavia
- Died: 7 April 2017 (aged 87); Zagreb, Croatia
- Occupation: Actor
- Years active: 1954–2014
- Spouse: Koraljka Bašić
- Children: 2
- Mother: Elly Bašić
- Relatives: Mladen Bašić (stepfather)
- Awards: Order of Danica Hrvatska

Relja Bašić (14 February 1930 – 7 April 2017) was a Croatian actor. With a career that lasted more than half a century, he is considered one of the most prolific performers of that country.

== Biography ==
Bašić was born on 14 February 1930 in Zagreb, then Kingdom of Yugoslavia. He was born to a Jewish mother Elly (née Lerch) Bašić. Bašić was raised by his mother and stepfather Mladen Bašić. He first appeared on screen in 1954 classic film Koncert. Through the decades, he played many different roles, often in international co-productions. He never became a star, but remained one of the most recognisable and dependable character actors. His specialty were the roles of suave aristocratic villains, especially in historic films dealing with World War II, but he is best remembered for the role of Mr. Fulir in 1970 cult comedy Tko pjeva zlo ne misli.

In the 1990s, Bašić was an enthusiastic supporter of the Croatian Social Liberal Party. During 1992 parliamentary elections he appeared as that party's candidate in one of Zagreb constituencies. He lost that race to Nedjeljko Mihanović of HDZ in controversial circumstances. A few months later, in the elections for upper house of the Croatian Parliament, he won the seat representing the City of Zagreb.

In 1995, President Tuđman awarded him with the Order of Danica Hrvatska.

Bašić also acted as a UNESCO Artist for Peace.

Several years before his death, Bašić suffered a femur fracture which restrained his mobility. He died on 7 April 2017, in Zagreb.

== Filmography ==
| Year | Title | Role | Notes |
|---|---|---|---|
| 1954 | Koncert | Bartol | |
| 1956 | Millions on the Island | Žuti / Štakor | |
| 1956 | The Siege | Adam | |
| 1956 | Pulverschnee nach Übersee | | |
| 1957 | Sand, Love and Salt | Innkeeper | |
| 1957 | Vraticu se | Svedok na sudu | |
| 1960 | The Battle of Austerlitz | Soldier | Uncredited |
| 1961 | The Seven Revenges | | |
| 1961 | Le goût de la violence | Commandante | |
| 1962 | Il capitano di ferro | | |
| 1962 | Il bandito della luce rossa | | |
| 1965 | Kljuc | Gost u hotelu | (segment "Poslije Predstave") |
| 1965 | Čovik od svita | Gastarbajter - Hrvat | |
| 1966 | Rondo | Fedja | |
| 1967 | Crne ptice | | |
| 1967 | Posalji coveka u pola dva | Inspektor | |
| 1967 | Fast ein Held | | |
| 1967 | Hasanaginica | Imotski kadija | |
| 1968 | I Have Two Mothers and Two Fathers | Prvi tata | |
| 1968 | Adriatic Sea of Fire | Capitaine Popovitch | |
| 1968 | Operation Cross Eagles | Admiral Von Vogels | |
| 1969 | Sedmina | Carlo Gasparone | |
| 1969 | Man on Horseback | Nagel | |
| 1969 | The Bridge | Sova / Obersturmführer Kautz | |
| 1969 | Nedjelja | Kucevlasnik | |
| 1969 | Wild Angels | Hotelski animator | |
| 1970 | The Gamblers | Yakov | |
| 1970 | The Fifth Day of Peace | Ten. George Romney | |
| 1970 | Togetherness | Mr. J.C. | |
| 1970 | One Song a Day Takes Mischief Away | Mr. Ernest Fulir | |
| 1970 | The Way to Paradise | Kristian Pendrekovski | |
| 1972 | Short Night of Glass Dolls | Ivan | |
| 1972 | The Deer Hunt | Advokat Janjic | |
| 1972 | Walter Defends Sarajevo | Obersturmführer - vodja ubacene grupe | |
| 1972 | The Curse of a Faithful Wife | | |
| 1973 | Little Mother | | |
| 1973 | You Get It, Man | Grof | |
| 1973 | Sutjeska | Capt. William Stewart | |
| 1973 | Ein für allemal | Santini | |
| 1973 | Pjegava djevojka | Mirando | |
| 1974 | Deps | Pijanac | |
| 1975 | The House | Arhitekt | |
| 1976 | The Rat Savior | Mayor | |
| 1976 | Violet | Zdenko | |
| 1978 | Praznovanje pomladi | Hauptman | |
| 1979 | Slow Motion | Bruno | |
| 1980 | Rad na odredjeno vreme | Zeljko Gospodnetic | |
| 1980 | The Woman from Sarajevo | | |
| 1981 | High Voltage | Jurcec | |
| 1982 | Cyclops | Atma | |
| 1982 | Moj tata na odredjeno vreme | Zeljko Gospodnetic | |
| 1983 | Un foro nel parabrezza | Tommasini | |
| 1984 | Bis später, ich muss mich erschiessen | Aristarch | |
| 1984 | Early Snow in Munich | Davor | |
| 1984 | Memed, My Hawk | Mad Durdu | |
| 1985 | Drei und eine halbe Portion | Gonzales | |
| 1985 | Jenseits der Morgenröte | Volkov | 4 episodes |
| 1985 | Love Letters with Intent | Primarijus | |
| 1985 | Anticasanova | Mirkov sef | |
| 1985 | Dancing in Water | Glenn | |
| 1986 | Nägel mit Köpfen | | |
| 1986 | The Lenz Papers | Ludwik Mierosławski | Episode: "Aufbruch" |
| 1987 | Secondo Ponzio Pilato | Annas | |
| 1987 | The Magic Snowman | Capt. Longbrau | |
| 1988 | Vila Orhideja | | |
| 1988 | The Way Steel Was Tempered | Misel | |
| 1988 | Honor Bound | General Gorodnikov | |
| 1989 | The Legendary Life of Ernest Hemingway | | |
| 1990 | A Summer to Remember | Grof | |
| 1990 | Captain America | Industrialist #2 | |
| 1991 | The Pope Must Die | Alberto | |
| 1991 | Memories of Midnight | Lieutenant Theophilos | |
| 1993 | Countess Dora | Krsnjavi | |
| 1995 | Internationale Zone | Gubarow | |
| 1997 | Cudnovate zgode segrta Hlapica | Crni Stakor | Voice |
| 1997 | Puska za uspavljivanje | Police chief's daughter | |
| 1998 | Transatlantik | | |
| 1998 | Kanjon opasnih igara | Karl Stolzer | |
| 2003 | Below the Line | Antun Pozgaj | |
| 2003 | Heimkehr | | |
| 2004 | Verflüchtigung | Mafia Boss | |
| 2006 | Libertas | Spanjolski konzul | |

== Bibliography ==
- Snješka Knežević, Aleksander Laslo (2011). Židovski Zagreb. Zagreb: AGM, Židovska općina Zagreb. ISBN 978-953-174-393-8.
