= The Stone Gate =

The Stone Gate (Kamenita vrata) is a 1992 Croatian film directed by Ante Babaja, starring Ivica Kunčević and Vedrana Međimorec.

== Plot ==
Branko Boras, a physician (Ivica Kunčević), is writing a book about the afterlife. Alienated from the world, with a failed marriage behind him, he meets Ana (Vedrana Međimorec), a somewhat mysterious woman who is a wife of a nouveau riche (Kruno Šarić). In her, Boras recognizes a soulmate, and they become close. His health is however, seriously failing, and reality and imagination begin to mix on his journey to the beyond...

== Sources ==
- "Kamenita vrata". kinotuskanac.hr (in Croatian). Croatian Film Association.
- "Kamenita vrata". Baza HR kinematografije (in Croatian). Croatian Film Association.
- "Kamenita vrata". mojtv.hr (in Croatian).
