= Ivica Rajković =

Croatian cinematographer (1935–2024)

- Born: 24 March 1935; Udbina, Kingdom of Yugoslavia
- Died: 11 November 2024 (aged 89)
- Occupation: Cinematographer
- Years active: 1965–1995
- Awards: Vladimir Nazor Award for Life Achievement in Film (2012)

Ivica Rajković (24 March 1935 – 11 November 2024) was a Croatian cinematographer.

== Life and career ==
Earlier in his career, Rajković worked as a photographer for Jadran Film, and later as an assistant to Tomislav Pinter. Rajković shot a total of 20 featured films, three television series, approximately 80 documentary films, and more than 3000 commercials.

Rajković received a Golden Arena for Best Cinematography in 1968 and a Vladimir Nazor Award for Life Achievement in Film in 2012.

Rajković died on 11 November 2024, at the age of 89.

== Selected filmography ==
=== Feature films ===
- Protest (1967)
- Gravitation (1968)
- I Have Two Mothers and Two Fathers (1968)
- Accidental Life (1969)
- One Song a Day Takes Mischief Away (1970)
- The Rat Savior (1976)
- Train in the Snow (1976)
- Court Martial (1978)
- The Secret of Nikola Tesla (1980)

=== Documentaries ===
- From 3 to 22 (1966)

== Sources ==
- Rajković Ivica at filmski-programi.hr (in Croatian)
- Rajković, Ivica at enciklopedija.hr (in Croatian)
- Čovjek kojem je vjerovao Orson Welles (in Croatian)
- Izložba: Iz filmskog albuma Ivice Rajkovića (in Croatian)
