= Sergio Mimica-Gezzan =

Croatian television director, producer, and actor (b. 1956)

- Born: Srđan Mimica; May 2, 1956 (age 70); Zagreb, PR Croatia, FPR Yugoslavia
- Other name: Srdjan Mimica
- Occupations: Television director, producer, actor
- Years active: 1966–present
- Father: Vatroslav Mimica

Sergio Mimica-Gezzan (born Srđan Mimica; born May 2, 1956) is a Croatian television director, producer, and actor.

== Life and career ==
Mimica-Gezzan was born in Zagreb to Croatian film director Vatroslav Mimica and his wife Giovanna Gezzan. As a boy and a young man, he appeared as an actor in his father's most well-known films Ponedjeljak ili utorak (1966) and Događaj (1969), and played the lead role in his 1975 Croatian film Anno Domini 1573 (Croatian: Seljačka buna 1573).

=== Assistant director ===
He began his career as an assistant director in his native Yugoslavia, under director Branko Ivanda. In 1982, he was the assistant director for the Yugoslavian unit of the American film Sophie's Choice (1982). He subsequently worked as an AD on several American productions shot in Yugoslavia, including The Winds of War (1983) and War and Remembrance (1988-89). He accompanied Serbian director Emir Kusturica to the United States for his film Arizona Dream.

Beginning with 1993's Schindler's List until 2004's The Terminal, Mimica-Gezzan was the principal assistant director for Steven Spielberg. He was also an associate producer of Minority Report and Catch Me If You Can (both 2002), and a co-producer of The Terminal. As AD, he shared the Directors Guild of America Award for Outstanding Directorial Achievement in Theatrical Feature Film for Schindler's List and Saving Private Ryan.

=== Television director ===
Mimica-Gezzan is now a regular lead director in episodic television. He directed six episodes of the reimagined Battlestar Galactica, two episodes of Heroes, two episodes of Raised by Wolves, three episodes of The Terror, and all eight episodes of The Pillars of the Earth, the television adaptation of Ken Follett's novel of the same name.

His other television credits include Invasion, Prison Break, Saving Grace, Terminator: The Sarah Connor Chronicles and Falling Skies. In 2014 he directed the Halo: Nightfall digital feature.
