= Slavko Štimac =

Serbian actor

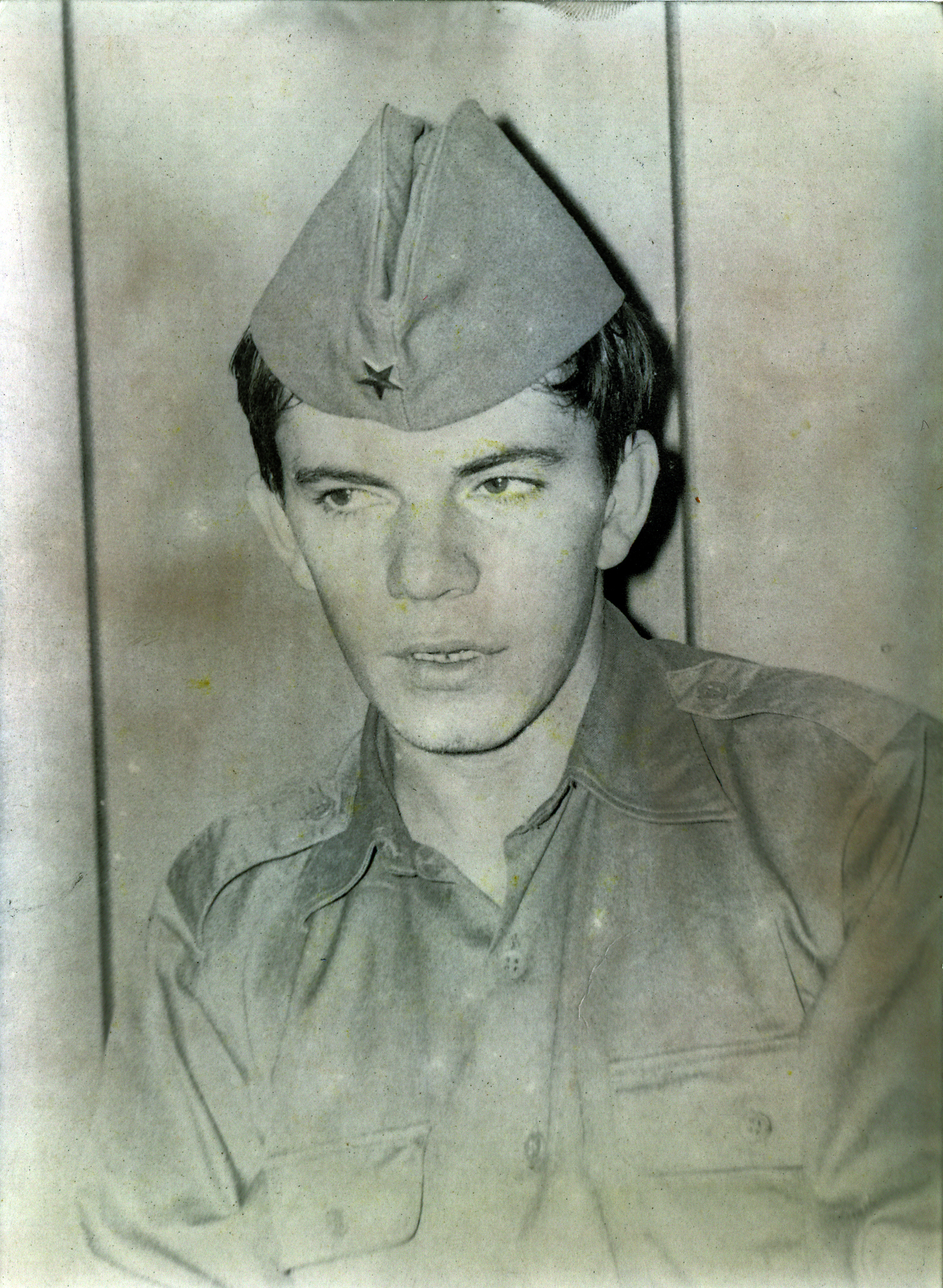
- Štimac in the 1980s
- Born: 15 October 1960 (age 65); Konjsko Brdo, PR Croatia, FPR Yugoslavia
- Occupation: Actor
- Years active: 1972–present

Slavko Štimac (born 15 October 1960) is a Serbian actor.

Born in a village near Perušić in Croatia, he later graduated from the Faculty of Dramatic Arts in Belgrade. Štimac made his screen debut in the 1972 children's film Vuk samotnjak, recruited at the age of ten years old after the wife of director Obrad Gluščević visited his school.

What followed was a career during which Štimac appeared in many popular and important 1970s and 1980s Yugoslav films where he played child and adolescent characters (including the role of young Russian soldier in Sam Peckinpah's Cross of Iron). His youthful looks later plagued his career, typecasting him into adolescent roles well into his 30s. However, in 2004 he had the leading role in Emir Kusturica's Life Is a Miracle, some years after playing the role of a stutterer in the internationally acclaimed film Underground of same director Kusturica.
