= Lisinski =

Lisinski, feminine: Lisinska may refer to:

== Surname ==
- Natalie Lisinska (born 1982), British-Canadian actress
- Vatroslav Lisinski (1819–1854), Croatian composer

== Other ==
- Vatroslav Lisinski Concert Hall, a concert hall and convention center in Zagreb
- Vatroslav Lisinski School of Music, a secondary-level music school in Zagreb, formerly associated with the Royal Academy of Music
- Lisinski (film), a 1944 Croatian film about Vatroslav Lisinski, directed by Oktavijan Miletić
