= Uglješa Kojadinović =

Serbian, Croatian and Yugoslav actor

Uglješa Kojadinović Угљеша Којадиновић
- Born: February 14, 1936; Glamočani, near Srbac, Kingdom of Yugoslavia
- Died: June 20, 1982 (aged 46); Bosanska Gradiška, Bosnia and Herzegovina, Yugoslavia
- Occupation: Actor
- Years active: 1963–1982

Uglješa Kojadinović (Serbian Cyrillic: Угљеша Којадиновић; 14 February 1936 – 20 June 1982) was a Yugoslav actor of Serb origin.

== Early life and education ==
Kojadinović was of Serb ethnicity, born in the village of Glamočani near Bardaca Lake and Srbac in what is now Bosnia and Herzegovina (then Kingdom of Yugoslavia). After graduating from acting schools in Glamocani and Banja Luka, he enrolled at the Drama Academy in Zagreb, where he graduated in the class of Professor Branko Gavella.

== Career ==
Kojadinović's acting gained in popularity by playing at the theater: Molière's Le Bourgeois gentilhomme, Fyodor Dostoyevsky's Demons, William Shakespeare's Hamnet as Horatio.

Kojadinović preferred theater, but became known for his many roles in TV series and movies: Black Birds, Doctor Mladen, The Pine Tree in the Mountain, Kaya, and others.

== Selected filmography ==
Acting filmography
Year	Title	Role
1960.
1963.	Licem u lice	Engineer Kosier
1965.	Apel	
1967.	Kineski zid	
1965.	Dileme	
1966.	Pedeseti rodjendan	
1967.	Crne ptice	
1967.	Kroz šibe	
1967.	Kineski zid	
1967.	Crne ptice	
1967.	Kaja, ubit ću te!	Pjero Coto
1968.	Dnevnik Ocenaseka	
1968.	Paviljon broj VI	
1968.	Agent iz Vaduza	
1969.	Žedj	The Man
1970.
1970.	Zlostavljanje	
1970.	Fiškal	Jakov Podgorski
1970.	Pansion sa toplom i hladnom vodom	
1971.	U gori raste zelen bor	Ustasha
1972.	Čovjek koji je bacio atomsku bombu na Hirošimu	David John
1972.	Kipić	
1972.	Prosjaci i sinovi	Dektiva
1972.	Okreni ledja vjetru	
1972.	Kipić	
1972.	Lenjin u Africi	
1973.	Bijeg	
1974.	U registraturi	Georges Jurich
1975.	Vrijeme ratno i poratno	
1976.	Doktor Mladen	Ustasha captain
1976.	Izdaja	
1976.	Klara Dombrovska	Feliks
1976.	Tri Jablana	
1977.	Marija	Johann,
1977.	Pucanj	Investigator
1978.	Debeli 'lad	
1978.	Oko	Barisa Surac
1978.	Slučaj Filipa Franjića	
1978.	Punom parom	Bos Djuro
1978.	Mačak pod šljemom	Siraca
1979.	Svjetionik	Capetan Horn
1980.
1980.	Obustava u strojnoj	
1981.	Snađi, se druže	Siraca
1981.	Velo misto	Professor
1982.	Hoću živjeti	Martin Starcevic
1982.	Nevolje jednog Branimira	
1982.	Trojanski konj	Robic
1982.	Nepokoreni grad	Divko Budak

== See also ==
- List of Yugoslavian films
- List of Serbs
- List of Serbian actors
- List of Serbian films
- List of Croatian films
- Republic of Srpska
