= A Crime in a School =

- Croatian: Zločin u školi
- Directed by: Branko Ivanda
- Written by: Ivan Kušan; Pavao Pavličić; Branko Ivanda
- Based on: Stroj za maglu by Pavao Pavličić
- Starring: Zlatko Vitez; Koraljka Hrs; Miodrag Krivokapić; Mustafa Nadarević; Zvonimir Lepetić; Dragutin Klobučar
- Cinematography: Ivica Rajković
- Edited by: Ingeborg Fülepp
- Music by: Alfi Kabiljo
- Release date: 1982
- Running time: 106 min

A Crime in a School (Zločin u školi) is a 1982 Croatian film directed by Branko Ivanda, starring Zlatko Vitez. It is based on Stroj za maglu, a novel by Pavao Pavličić. The film received the Kodak-Pathé Award for Cinematography at the 29th Pula Film Festival.

== Plot ==
Zlatko Kovač (Vitez), a small-town professor of Croatian language, moves to Zagreb to a new job in a gymnasium. He learns that his predecessor, professor Toth, died in the school in suspicious circumstances. One morning, he discovers a dead man in the teachers' staffroom. While the police fail to make progress in solving the case, Kovač finds out that what the two dead men had in common was an event during the student protests of 1968 to which he was himself an accidental witness. He is convinced that the murderer is one of the school's staff and plans to entrap him at the celebration of the school's 30th anniversary.
