= The Fourth Companion =

- Czech poster for The Fourth Companion
- Croatian: Četvrti suputnik
- Directed by: Branko Bauer
- Written by: Branko Bauer; Slavko Goldstein
- Starring: Mihailo Kostić; Renata Freishorn; Ilija Džuvalekovski; Mira Župan; Emil Glad; Josip Marotti; Ervina Dragman
- Cinematography: Tomislav Pinter
- Edited by: Katja Majer
- Music by: Tomislav Simović
- Production companies: Filmska radna zajednica; Organsko hemijska industrija Skopje
- Release date: 1967
- Running time: 85 min.

The Fourth Companion (Četvrti suputnik) is a Croatian film directed by Branko Bauer. It was released in 1967. The film is a continuation in spirit of Bauer's previous film Face to Face.

== Plot ==
New party committee secretary, Ivan (Mihailo Kostić), throws a wrench in city power broker Niko's (Ilija Džuvalekovski) plan to manipulate local factory workers into paying for the construction of a new sports centre. Meanwhile, Niko is having an affair with a young female professor (Renata Freishorn).
