= Monday or Tuesday (film) =

- Directed by: Vatroslav Mimica
- Written by: Vatroslav Mimica; Fedor Vidas
- Starring: Slobodan Dimitrijević; Pavle Vuisić; Gizela Huml; Jagoda Kaloper; Sergio Mimica-Gezzan; Fabijan Šovagović; Rudolf Kukić; Renata Freiskorn; Olivera Vučo
- Cinematography: Tomislav Pinter
- Edited by: Katja Majer
- Music by: Miljenko Prohaska
- Production company: Jadran Film
- Release date: July 16, 1966
- Running time: 84 minutes
- Country: Yugoslavia
- Language: Serbo-Croatian

Monday or Tuesday (Serbo-Croatian: Ponedjeljak ili utorak) is a 1966 Yugoslav drama film directed by Vatroslav Mimica starring Slobodan Dimitrijević.

== Plot ==
The film follows a day in the life of a divorced Zagreb journalist Marko Požgaj (played by Dimitrijević), an average modern intellectual who goes about his daily business. Mundane scenes of Požgaj's day are shown interspersed with flashbacks and fantastic imagery reflecting his inner life. These include his recollections of childhood, his feelings about the present and past, including memories of his first marriage, his current girlfriend Rajka (Jagoda Kaloper) and his father killed in World War II (Pavle Vuisić), as well as his fantasies and hopes about the future.

== Themes ==
The film's title is a famous quote from Virginia Woolf's 1919 work Modern Fiction (and the title of her 1921 short story collection) in which she described her approach to writing:

"Examine for a moment an ordinary mind on an ordinary day. The mind receives a myriad impressions—trivial, fantastic, evanescent, or engraved with the sharpness of steel. From all sides they come, an incessant shower of innumerable atoms; and as they fall, as they shape themselves into the life of Monday or Tuesday."

The film is today regarded as a logical continuation in Mimica's body of work as it replicates the stream of consciousness concept previously seen in his critically acclaimed 1964 film Prometheus of the Island. The film's visual structure (based on a collage of scenes set in the past and present mixed with fantastic imagery, which are indicated by changes in picture quality and colour) and the theme of contemporary social alienation (in part resulting from the trauma of World War II) have urged critics to draw comparisons to his animated film The Inspector Is Back! (Inspektor se vratio kući, 1957) and have been called "trademarks of Mimica's entire body of work".

== Reception ==
Andrew James Horton, writing for the film journal Kinoeye wrote in 2001:

"Some of the devices now seem a little dated. Changes in image quality and colour are probably less exciting now than they were then, and the intercutting of documentary footage of the concentration camps particularly now has a somewhat heavy-handed and "obvious" feel to it. But the film still exudes the appeal of what the New Wave must have looked like when it first emerged as a trend, with its concentration on ordinary people and charmingly observed street scenes. And its this that makes the film endearing. There's none of the removed coldness that formal experimentation can bring to a film as an unfortunate by-product."

The film won the Best Film and the Best Director Golden Arena awards at the 1966 Pula Film Festival, the Yugoslav national film awards festival. In addition, Tomislav Pinter won his third Best Cinematography award for his work on both Monday or Tuesday and Rondo (directed by Zvonimir Berković).
