= Captain Mikula, the Kid =

1974 film directed by Obrad Gluščević

- Directed by: Obrad Gluščević
- Written by: Obrad Gluščević; Stjepan Seselj
- Starring: Petar Prlicko; Tonci Vidan; Josko Pazanin
- Release date: 4 June 1974
- Country: Yugoslavia
- Languages: English; German; Serbo-Croatian

Captain Mikula, the Kid (Kapetan Mikula Mali) is a Croatian film directed by Obrad Gluščević. It was released in 1974.
