= The Holocaust in Croatia (book) =

2001 Croatian book

- First edition (2001)
- Author: Ivo Goldstein; Slavko Goldstein
- Original title: Holokaust u Zagrebu
- Language: Croatian
- Genre: Non-fiction
- Publisher: Novi liber
- Publication date: 2001
- Publication place: Croatia
- English publication date: 2016

The Holocaust in Croatia (2016) is a book by Ivo and Slavko Goldstein, first published as Holokaust u Zagrebu (in Croatian) in 2001. It received positive reviews in English-language publications, and was praised for its evenhanded and nuanced approach to controversial subject matter. It was criticized by historian Jure Krišto. It was a finalist for the National Jewish Book Award.
