= The True State of the Affairs =

- Directed by: Vladan Slijepčević
- Screenplay by: Vladan Slijepčević; Jovan Ćirilov
- Starring: Miloš Žutić; Branislava Zorić; Mihajlo Kostić; Stanislava Pešić; Dragan Ocokoljić; Vesna Krajina
- Cinematography: Tomislav Pinter
- Edited by: Maja Lazarov
- Music by: Vladimir Kraus-Rajterić
- Production company: Jadran Film
- Release date: 1964
- Running time: 94 minutes
- Country: Yugoslavia
- Language: Serbo-Croatian

The True State of the Affairs (Pravo stanje stvari) is a 1964 Yugoslav drama film directed by Vladan Slijepčević.

== Plot ==
A young engineer Zoran Javkovljević (Miloš Žutić) is serving in the Yugoslav People's Army while his spouse Branka (Branka Zorić) is having an affair with another man. Upon returning, he finds out about her romantic entanglement and decides to return the favour.

== Sources ==
- Pravo stanje stvari - Filmski klub (in Croatian)
