= The Fed One =

- Directed by: Vatroslav Mimica
- Written by: Milan Grgić
- Based on: Hranjenik by Milan Grgić
- Starring: Fabijan Šovagović; Kole Angelovski; Zvonimir Črnko; Giuseppe Addobbati; Kruno Valentić; Edo Peročević; Ilija Ivezić
- Cinematography: Frano Vodopivec
- Edited by: Katja Majer
- Music by: Živan Cvitković
- Production company: Jadran Film
- Release date: 10 July 1970
- Running time: 88 minutes
- Country: Yugoslavia
- Language: Serbo-Croatian

The Fed One (Croatian: Hranjenik) is a 1970 Yugoslav feature film directed by Vatroslav Mimica. It is based on a play of the same name by Milan Grgić.

The film was selected for preservation by the Croatian State Archives.
