= The Key (1965 film) =

- Directed by: Vanča Kljaković; Krsto Papić; Antun Vrdoljak
- Written by: KAPPA
- Produced by: KAPPA
- Starring: Relja Bašić; Božidar Boban; Slobodan Dimitrijević; Vanja Drach; Ljubica Jović; Jagoda Kaloper; Stevo Krnjajić; Sven Lasta; Marija Lojk; Tana Mascarelli; Zvonimir Rogoz; Fabijan Šovagović; Branko Špoljar
- Cinematography: Tomislav Pinter; Nikola Tanhofer
- Music by: Boško Petrović; Tomica Simović
- Production company: Jadran Film
- Release date: 10 July 1965
- Running time: 104 minutes
- Country: Yugoslavia
- Language: Serbo-Croatian

The Key (Croatian: Ključ) is a 1965 Croatian omnibus film. It consists of three segments directed by Vanča Kljaković, Krsto Papić and Antun Vrdoljak.

== Plot ==
The movie focuses on everyday personal struggles, romance, and moral dilemmas in the city, split into three segments directed by Vanča Kljaković, Krsto Papić, and Antun Vrdoljak.

Segment 1: Directed by Vanča KljakovićThe first story follows a young couple, Boris and Vera, who find themselves in an incredibly awkward financial and romantic predicament. Struggling to find any privacy, they are forced to deal with their living circumstances and relationship anxieties in the fast-paced, urban environment of Zagreb.

Segment 2 Directed by Krsto PapićThe second segment shifts focus to Ivan and Sonja, exploring themes of detachment and the complexities of young love in the city. Their narrative highlights the emotional misunderstandings and distance that can creep into relationships, even when two people are trying to make things work.

Segment 3: Directed by Antun VrdoljakThe final segment of the omnibus wraps up the film by delving into another slice of urban life. The characters navigate various social expectations, personal secrets, and the shifting moral landscape of 1960s Yugoslavia.

== Cast ==
- Bozidar Boban as Boris
- Jagoda Kaloper as Vera
- Kruno Valentic as Milicajac
- Marija Lojk as Sonja
- Slobodan Dimitrijevic as Ivan

== Sources ==
- Ključ at hrfilm.hr (in Croatian)
