= Manca Košir =

Slovenian journalist (1948–2024)

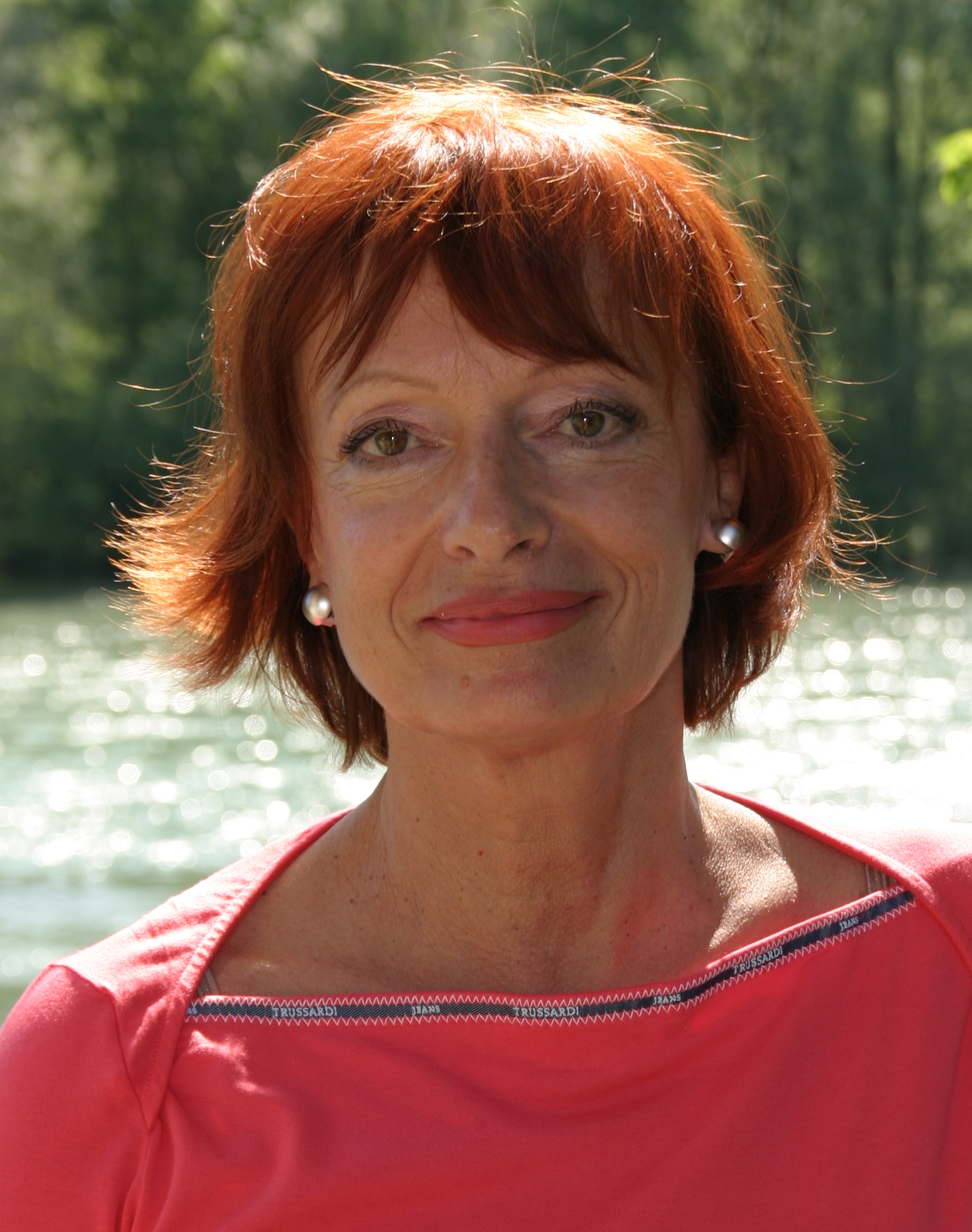
- Košir in 2005
- Born: 5 March 1948; Maribor, PR Slovenia, FPR Yugoslavia
- Died: 2 May 2024 (aged 76); Ljubljana, Slovenia
- Education: University of Ljubljana; University of Zagreb
- Scientific career
- Fields: Journalism studies; Philology; Sociology
- Workplaces: University of Ljubljana

Manca Košir (5 March 1948 – 2 May 2024) was a Slovenian journalist, philologist, politician, and film actress. She began her career as a film actress and a mathematics instructor. She then began to work as a journalist, while also studying journalism academically, as a professor of journalism studies and the chair of the journalism department at The University of Ljubljana. She was one of the first people in Slovenia to engage in the academic study of journalism. In 2011, she co-founded the political party Movement for Sustainable Development of Slovenia (sl), and was elected as the party's first president.

== Life and career ==
Košir studied at the School of Natural Science and Mathematics in Ljubljana (sl), graduating with a degree in mathematics and physics in 1969, initially with the intention of becoming a teacher of mathematics. When she was a first-year undergraduate student in 1967, she made her film debut in Breza (The Birch Tree). She then starred in the TV drama Pravljica na podstrešju (Fairy Tale in the Attic). She ultimately appeared in about 30 films, largely throughout the 1960s and 1970s, including Real Pests, Sreča na vrvici (sl, Happiness on a Leash), and Ko pride lev (sl, When the lion comes).

In 1975, Košir obtained a degree in journalism from the School of Sociology, Political Science and Journalism in Ljubljana (sl). In 1979 she obtained a master's degree in sociology, and in 1987 she graduated with a doctorate in philology from The Faculty of Humanities and Social Sciences at the University of Zagreb.

From 1970 to 1973, Košir published regularly in the Slovenian current affairs magazine Mladina. She continued to work as a journalist with the Tedenska tribuna and Teleks, and wrote for many other Yugoslav newspapers. She was also a member of the editorial board of Nova revija magazine from 1982 to 2000.

In 1993, she became a professor of journalism in the Faculty of Social Sciences of the University of Ljubljana. She was the chair of the journalism department there for several years. In addition to her journalistic pieces and academic articles, she wrote substantial popular science works and was an author of more than a dozen books, including several textbooks. She was credited with being one of the earliest scholars of journalism in Slovenia.

On 1 October 2011, she became the president of the Movement for Sustainable Development of Slovenia, which she had co-created with the sociologist Matjaž Hanžek (sl).

Košir died on 2 May 2024, at the age of 76.
