= Woof-Woof =

Woof-Woof (Croatian: Vau-Vau) is a 1964 animated short by Boris Kolar for Zagreb Film, with music by Anđelko Klobučar. Woof-Woof "satirizes the prejudice in the animal world with kittens that bark, and puppies that meow (to the consternation of their parents)". In the short, Boris Kolar experimented with lines, bringing his characters close to abstract symbols.

== Reception ==
Cinemacats described it as a "very artistic film drawn in a loose and clever style which tells its simple story in a charming way". John Martz of Drawn.ca notes "The minimal drawings aren't much more than scribbles, but they are filled with such life and personality, that you'd hardly notice". The short was nominated for an Academy Award for Best Short Film. It won the first prize at International Short Film Festival Oberhausen.
