= Daniel Ivin =

Croatian writer (1932–2021)

- Born: Danko Goldstein; 16 April 1932; Karlovac, Yugoslavia (now Karlovac, Croatia)
- Died: 20 June 2021 (aged 89)
- Other names: Danijel Ivin
- Occupations: Writer; activist
- Known for: Co-founding the Croatian Social Liberal Party (HSLS)
- Parent(s): Ivo and Lea Goldstein
- Relatives: Slavko Goldstein (brother); Ivo Goldstein (nephew)

Daniel Ivin (born Danko Goldstein; 16 April 1932 – 20 June 2021) was a Croatian writer, politician and human rights activist.

== Biography ==
Ivin was born in April 1932, and raised in Karlovac, in a Jewish family. His elder brother was Slavko Goldstein.

His father, Ivo ("Izchak") Goldstein, was a book dealer in Karlovac. In 1941, his father was murdered by the Ustaše at the Jadovno concentration camp.

As a boy, Danko joined the Partisans and served as a courier. At the end of 1942, he watched over Ustaše captive Jure Francetić and informed the Partisan headquarters about the latter's health. He changed his name from Danko to Daniel/Danijel, and surname from Goldstein to Ivin (meaning son of Ivo) in honour of his late father.

From 1949–52, Ivin lived in Israel and served in Israel Defense Forces. Upon his return to Croatia he worked as a journalist. Later he worked under Franjo Tuđman at the "Institute for history of the labor movement" in Zagreb. In 1966, for his attempt to start the non-Communist newspaper Slobodna riječ (Free word), he was sentenced to several months in prison under charges of organizing the assassination of Josip Broz Tito.

After being released, Ivin lived in Switzerland and Great Britain. In 1989, together with his brother Slavko, Ivin founded the Croatian Social Liberal Party.

In 1993 he co-founded the Croatian Helsinki Committee, serving as president in 2007. In 2012 he was elected as a new president of the "Council of the Croatian anti-fascists".

Ivin died on 20 June 2021, at the age of 89.

== Works ==
- Hrvatsko pitanje: Nitko ne gleda kroz prozor sam (1999), Nakladni Zavod Matice Hrvatske, Zagreb
- Revolution und Evolution in Jugoslawien (1968), Francke Verlag, Bern
