= Hrvoje Turković =

Croatian film theorist

- Born: 4 November 1943 (age 82); Zagreb, Croatia
- Occupation: University professor (retired)
- Years active: 1965–present
- Employer: Academy of Dramatic Art, University of Zagreb
- Known for: Works on film theory
- Awards: Vladimir Nazor Award for Life Achievement in Film (2011); Order of Danica Hrvatska

Hrvoje Turković (hur-VO-yeh tur-KOH-vich; born 4 November 1943) is a Croatian film theorist, film critic and university professor. With 14 books and more than 700 articles on film, ranging from essayistic criticism to scientific works on film theory, Turković established himself as one of Croatia's most important critics and film scholars. He is a recipient of the Vladimir Nazor Lifetime Achievement Award for Contribution to Film.

== Biography ==
Turković was born in Zagreb in 1943. He spent a significant part of his childhood, including first two years of high school, in Crikvenica. He graduated from high school in Zagreb in 1962, received a B.A. degree in philosophy and sociology from the Faculty of Humanities and Social Sciences, University of Zagreb in 1972, and an M.A. in film studies from the New York University Graduate School of Arts and Science in 1976, on a Fulbright Program grant. Turković obtained his Ph.D. in film theory from the Faculty of Humanities and Social Sciences in Zagreb in 1991.

Since 1977, Turković taught at the Academy of Dramatic Art, University of Zagreb, retiring in 2009 as full professor. From 2006, Turković teaches Ph.D. courses at the Faculty of Humanities and Social Sciences in Zagreb.

From 1998 to 2016, Turković was the president of the Croatian Film Association. He was the founding president of the Croatian Society of Film Critics (1992–1994).

Turković served as an editor in a number of journals and magazines: Polet (1967–1968), Studentski list (1969–1971), Prolog (1971–1974), Pitanja (1975–1976), Film (1976–1979), Oko (1989–1990), Hrvatski filmski ljetopis (1995–present). He is the editor-in-chief of the Encyclopedic Film Dictionary (Croatian: Filmski enciklopedijski rječnik), a work started in 2010 by the Miroslav Krleža Institute of Lexicography in Zagreb.

Turković lives in Zagreb with his wife Snježana Tribuson, who is a film and television director, a screenwriter, and a professor at the Academy of Dramatic Art, University of Zagreb. They have one son, Goran, graphic designer (born c. 1983).

== Works ==
As of 2011, Turković published 14 books about film and television, and a book about visual arts theory (Understanding Perspective, 2002). He wrote more than 700 articles about film, and contributed entries for Film Encyclopedia and Film Lexicon, published by the Miroslav Krleža Institute of Lexicography.

Turković's work deals with film criticism and film theory, discussing topics related to national cinema, film history and culture. He introduced the methods of semiotics, as well as the communication and cognitive theories of film.

=== Books ===
- Filmska opredjeljenja [Film Orientations]. Zagreb: Meandar. 1985.
- Metafilmologija, strukturalizam, semiotika [Metafilmology, Structuralism, Semiotics]. Zagreb: Filmoteka 16. 1986.
- Razumijevanje filma [Understanding Film]. Zagreb: GZH. 1988.
- Teorija filma [Film Theory]. Zagreb: Meandar. 1994.(3rd ed. 2012)
- Umijeće filma [The Art of Film]. Zagreb: Croatian Film Association. 1996.
- Suvremeni film [Contemporary Film]. Zagreb: Znanje. 1999.
- Razumijevanje perspektive [Understanding Perspective]. Zagreb: Durieux. 2002.
- Hrvatska kinematografija 1991-2002 [Croatian Cinema 1991-2002]. Zagreb: Croatian Ministry of Culture and Croatian Film Association. 2003. (with Vjekoslav Majcen)
- Film: zabava, žanr, stil [Film: Entertainment, Genre, Style]. Zagreb: Croatian Film Association. 2005.
- Narav televizije [The Nature of Television]. Zagreb: Meandar. 2008.
- Retoričke regulacije [Rhetorical Regulations]. Zagreb: AGM. 2008.
- Nacrt filmske genealogije [Film Genealogy]. Zagreb: Matica hrvatska. 2010.
- Život izmišljotina. Ogledi o animiranom filmu [Life of Fabrication. Essays on Animated Film]. Zagreb: Croatian Film Association. 2012.
- Politikom po kulturi. Polemike (1968-2002) (Politics Against the Culture. Polemics (1968-2002)). Zagreb: Meandarmedia. 2016.
- Rasprava o popratnoj filmskoj glazbi (A Discourse on Nondiegetic Film Music). Zagreb: Akademija dramske umjetnosti. 2020.
- Tipovi filmskog izlaganja. Prilog teoriji izlaganja (Types of Film Discourse. A Contribution to the Discourse Theory). Zagreb: Hrvatski filmski savez. 2021.
