= Veliko suđenje =

1961 film directed by Fedor Škubonja

Veliko suđenje is a Croatian film. It was released in 1961.
