= Slobodan Dimitrijević =

Croatian actor (1941–1999)

- Слободан Димитријевић
- Born: 20 April 1941; Niš, German-occupied Yugoslavia
- Died: 4 December 1999 (aged 58); Zagreb, Croatia
- Other name: Lobi Dimitrijević
- Occupation: Actor
- Years active: 1961–1999

Slobodan Dimitrijević (Serbian Cyrillic: Слободан Димитријевић; 20 April 1941 – 4 December 1999) was a Serbian television and film actor.

== Partial filmography ==
- Igre na skelama (1961) - Stasa
- Treasure of Silver Lake (1962) - Rollender Donner
- Prometheus of the Island (1964) - Mladi Mate
- The Key (1965) - Ivan (segment "Cekati")
- The Oil Prince (1965) - Knife
- Duel at Sundown (1965) - Rancher (uncredited)
- The Desperado Trail (1965) - Schneller Panther [Quick Panther]
- Manhattan Night of Murder (1965) - Alec Korsky
- Monday or Tuesday (1966) - Marko Pozgaj
- Target for Killing (1966) - KIller
- Fruits amers - Soledad (1967)
- Murderers Club of Brooklyn (1967) - Malbran
- Illusion (1967) - Ivo
- Lelejska gora (1968) - Lado Tajovic
- Sunce tudjeg neba (1968) - Gane
- Weisse Wölfe (1969) - Listiger Fuchs
- Vreme bez vojna (1969) - Fidan
- Bronte: cronaca di un massacro che i libri di storia non hanno raccontato (1972) - Nunzio Sampieri
- Walter Defends Sarajevo (1972) - Suri
- Istrel (1972) - Emanuel
- Little Mother (1973)
- Sutjeska (1973) - Kurir pri glavnom stabu
- So (1973)
- SB zatvara krug (1974) - Bozovic
- Pogled iz potkrovlija (1974) - Inspector Mark Santini
- The Peaks of Zelengora (1976) - Andrija
- Stand Up Straight, Delfina (1977) - Mladen
- Operation Stadium (1977) - Sturmbannführer Ebner
- Stici pre svitanja (1978) - Ivan
- Mannen i skuggan (1978) - Santiago
- Journalist (1979) - Slavko, predsjednik radnickog savjeta
- Trofej (1979) - Vuksan Tomasevic
- Somewhere, Sometime (1979)
- Siroko je lisce (1981) - Branko
- Snadji se, druze (1981)
- The Winds of War (1983) - Russian soldier (uncredited)
- Opasni trag (1984) - Stranac
- Jenseits der Morgenröte (1985, TV Mini-Series) - Makejew
- Gymkata (1985) - Tamerlane
- Out of Control (1985) - Gypsy
- The War Boy (1985) - SS captain
- Donator (1989) - Kapetan Koch
- Hamburg Altona (1989)
- Le grand ruban (Truck) (1990)
- Death of a Schoolboy (1990)
- Born to Ride (1991) - SS Col. Muhl
- Gospa (1995) - Pilot
- Earth Song (1995, music video)
- Comanche Territory (1997) - Oficial en el casino
- The Peacemaker (1997) - Serb Official
- Pont Neuf (1997) - Racic's Father
- Zavaravanje (1998)
- Četverored (1999) - Treci Isljednik
