= Bardača =

Wetland in Bosnia and Herzegovina

Bardača Nature Park
- IUCN category III (natural monument or feature)
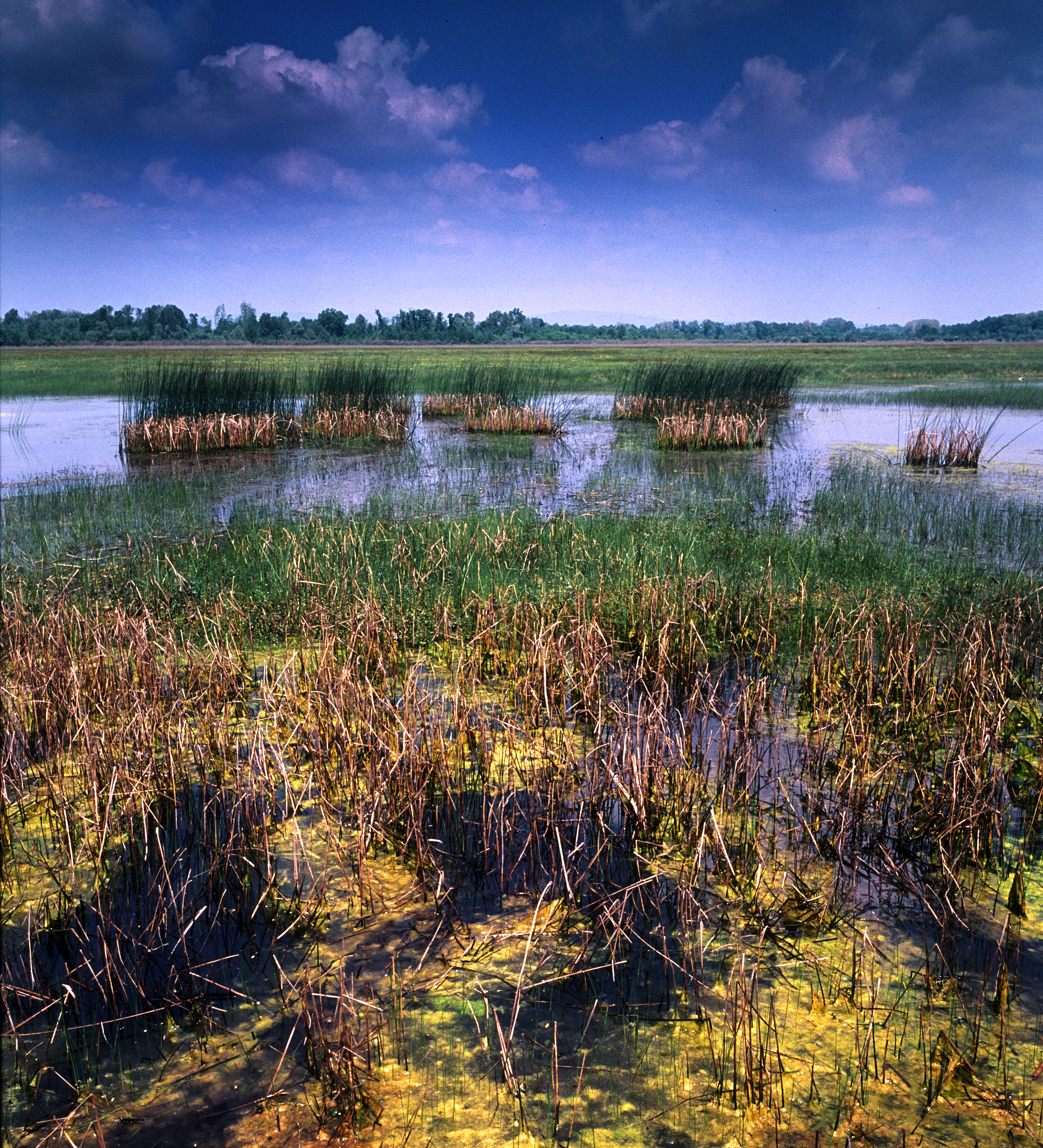

- Location within Bosnia and Herzegovina
- Interactive map of Bardača Nature Park
- Location: Republika Srpska, Bosnia and Herzegovina
- Nearest city: Gradiška
- Coordinates: 45°06′35.56″N 17°25′52.26″E
- Area: 35.00 km^{2} (13.51 sq mi)
- Designation

Ramsar Wetland
- Official name: Bardaca Wetland
- Designated: 2 February 2007
- Reference no.: 1658
- Established: 1995

Bardača (Serbian Cyrillic: Бардача), or Bardača Wetland (Serbo-Croatian: Bardača močvarni kompleks), was wetland complex of lakes and marshes, and is Important Bird Area on 3,500 ha, in the municipality of Srbac, northern Republika Srpska, Bosnia and Herzegovina. It lies about 30 kilometres from Banja Luka. Area of the lake and marshes were protected as nature park (Nature Monument – IUCN Category III), Bardača Nature Park. It was designated as a Ramsar site 2 February 2007.

== See also ==
- List of lakes in Bosnia and Herzegovina
- List of protected areas of Bosnia and Herzegovina
