= An Event =

- Directed by: Vatroslav Mimica
- Written by: Željko Senečić; Vatroslav Mimica; Kruno Quien; Anton Chekhov (Story)
- Starring: Pavle Vuisić; Sergio Mimica-Gezzan; Boris Dvornik; Fabijan Šovagović; Neda Spasojević; Marina Nemet; Fahro Konjhodžić
- Cinematography: Frano Vodopivec
- Edited by: Katja Majer
- Production company: Jadran Film
- Release date: 15 July 1969
- Running time: 88 minutes
- Country: Yugoslavia
- Language: Serbo-Croatian

An Event (Croatian: Događaj) is a 1969 Yugoslav feature film directed by Vatroslav Mimica, based on a short story by Anton Chekhov.

The adapted story was translated into English as "An Adventure (A Driver's Story)".
