= The Man in the Photograph =

- Directed by: Vladimir Pogačić
- Written by: Dragoslav Ilic
- Starring: Nikola Milic; Olivera Markovic; Janez Vrhovec
- Cinematography: Milorad Markovic
- Edited by: Ljerka Stanojevic
- Production company: Jadran Film
- Release date: 8 July 1963
- Country: Yugoslavia
- Language: Serbo-Croatian

The Man in the Photograph (Čovjek s fotografije) is a Yugoslavian film directed by Vladimir Pogačić. It was released in 1963.

== Plot ==
Žika Tasić, a clerk, is arrested because of his resemblance to Beli, a resistance member. Under torture, Žika confesses everything he was accused of, but Beli is apparently still active, and the police realize they have the wrong man. Šulc, the Gestapo chief, releases Žika as a decoy in order to capture Beli, while the resistance hope to use Žika to assassinate Šulc.

== Sources ==
- Čovjek s fotografije at hrfilm.hr
