= Back of the Medal =

1965 film by Fadil Hadžić

Back of the Medal (Druga strana medalje) is a 1965 Croatian film directed by Fadil Hadžić, starring Toma Jovanović, Franjo Kumer, Rade Marković and Judita Han.

== Plot ==
Eva Ružić (Judita Han) is sentenced to seven years in prison for embezzlement, after fully admitting her guilt in the court. Police inspector Hribar (Toma Jovanović), while convinced of her guilt, is puzzled over her motives. Eva is a model communist and a former Partisan, with an otherwise spotless reputation, so Hribar tries to uncover the "back of the medal", that is, the real reasons Eva turned to crime. In his investigation, the inspector finds out that she was a victim of extortion by Farkaš (Franjo Kumer), who threatened Eva with falsely exposing her as a World War II traitor...
