= Gravitation (film) =

1968 film by Branko Ivanda

- Gravitacija ili fantastična mladost činovnika Borisa Horvata
- Directed by: Branko Ivanda
- Starring: Rade Šerbedžija; Snežana Nikšić; Zaim Muzaferija; Jagoda Kaloper; Đuro Rogina; Zdravko Pošta; Mustafa Nadarević; Jelica Lovrić; Fabijan Šovagović
- Cinematography: Ivica Rajković
- Edited by: Lida Braniš
- Music by: Miljenko Prohaska
- Production company: Jadran Film
- Release date: 15 July 1968 (Yugoslavia)
- Running time: 84 minutes
- Country: SFR Yugoslavia

Gravitation (Serbo-Croatian: Gravitacija ili fantastična mladost činovnika Borisa Horvata; English: The Fantastic Youth of Bank Clerk Boris Horvat) is a 1968 Yugoslav film from Croatia directed by Branko Ivanda and starring Rade Šerbedžija.
