= Slavko Goldstein =

Croatian writer and publisher (1928–2017)

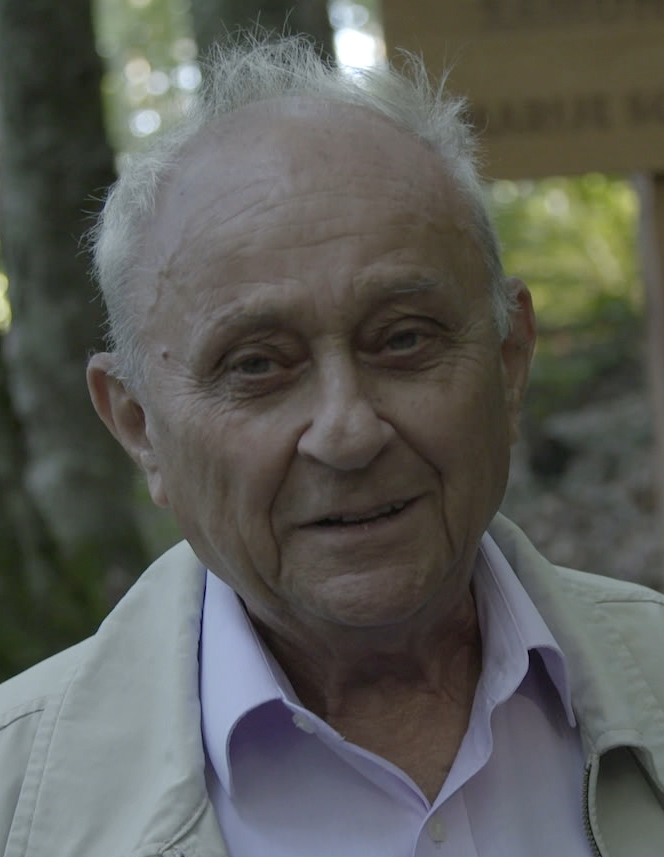
- Goldstein in 2017
- Born: 22 August 1928; Sarajevo, Kingdom of Serbs, Croats and Slovenes
- Died: 13 September 2017 (aged 89); Zagreb, Croatia
- Occupations: Writer, historian
- Political party: Croatian Social Liberal Party
- Spouse: Vera Goldstein (deceased)
- Children: 2, including Ivo
- Relatives: Daniel Ivin (brother)

Slavko Goldstein (22 August 1928 – 13 September 2017) was a Croatian historian, politician, and fiction writer.

== Biography ==
=== Early life ===
Slavko Goldstein was born in Sarajevo in the Jewish family of Ivo and Lea Goldstein. His grandfather Aron had come to Karlovac, which was at the time in the Austro-Hungarian Empire, in 1890 from Transylvania. There he worked in Lisander Reich's bookshop, and married the latter's sister Adolfa. The Goldsteins then opened a trade in Topusko, and later moved to Orljavac. From there, they moved to Tuzla where they opened a store and where Slavko's father Ivo (Izchak) was born. After he graduated agronomy in Vienna, Slavko's father returned briefly to Tuzla and, as a convinced Zionist, moved to Mandatory Palestine. He lived in an agricultural kibbutz near Haifa. In 1928, with his wife Lea, whom he had met in Palestine, he returned to the Kingdom of Yugoslavia – not in Tuzla with his father, but in Karlovac where he took over the bookshop from his uncle Lisander Reich. Slavko was born during a trip to Sarajevo, and spent his childhood in Karlovac with his brother Danko (Daniel), where his father was a book dealer.

=== Second World War ===
During the Second World War and the 1941 Nazi occupation of Yugoslavia, Slavko's father was arrested by the Ustaša, while Slavko escaped from Karlovac to Banski Kovačevac where he was hidden by the Djerek family. His brother Danko took his grandfather Aron to Tuzla, while his mother Lea was in jail from July to August, when she was released thanks to some friends. In January 1942, all three were found in Kraljevica. They thus joined the Partisans with whom they stayed until the end of the war. From Spring 1942 to 1945, Goldstein was active in the field and combat units of the NOVJ. He ended the war, at 17, with the rank of Lieutenant. His mother Lea spent the war in the medical service, and his brother Danko as a courier for the Agitprop of the Central Committee of the Communist Party of Yugoslavia (KPJ).

Slavko's father was killed at Jadovno concentration camp at the end of July or the first day of August 1941. Apart from his father, Slavko lost a part of the family from Tuzla during the Holocaust, who were killed in the Jasenovac concentration camp and Auschwitz.

=== After the war ===
After the war, Slavko Goldstein graduated in 1947 from the Karlovac Gymnasium. Then he moved to Zagreb with his family. After the establishment of the State of Israel in 1949, he emigrated with his brother Danko and participated in the war for Israel's independence as a member of Israel Defense Forces. He lived there for few years in a kibbutz with his brother. He returned to SFR Yugoslavia in the 1950s, and started studying literature and philosophy at the Zagreb Faculty of Humanities and Social Sciences, but he never graduated. In the 1950s, Slavko married the Croat Vera Goldstein. Their son Ivo Goldstein was born in 1958.

=== Writing career ===
During his studies, Goldstein began working as a journalist. He worked at Jadran Film, and in 1952 was a member of the editorial staff of Vjesnika u srijedu, editor at Radio Zagreb, and since 1969 editor-in-chief of the publishing house Stvarnost. Since the 1950s, Goldstein has been continuously active in journalism, publishing and public life in Yugoslavia and later Croatia. He also worked as an editor of Vjesnik. He is the founder of the publishing house Sveučilišne naklade Liber."

Goldstein also directed five documentary films, and wrote screenplays for several Yugoslav World War II films such as Signal Over the City (Signali nad gradom, 1960), Prometheus of the Island (Prometej s otoka Viševice, 1964; co-written with Vatroslav Mimica and Krunoslav Quien), and Operation Stadium (Akcija stadion, 1977; co-written with Dušan Vukotić). He edited more than 150 books, and worked as a publisher on about 400 titles.

=== Later years ===
One article claims Goldstein identified as "Yugoslav". However, in his book '1941: The Year That Keeps Returning' he repeatedly refers to himself as a Croatian Jew. On 20 May 1989, together with his brother and several associates from Cankarjeva založba, where he worked then (Vlado Gotovac and Božo Kovačević were also employed there), he founded the first political party in modern Croatia, the Croatian Social Liberal Party (HSLS) and until February 1990 was its President. He launched the journal for democratic culture "Erazmus", of which he was also the editor-in-chief.

During the 1990s, Goldstein opposed the nationalist politics of the Croatian President Franjo Tuđman, as well as the privatization process. Together with several other Croatian intellectuals, he signed a request for the resignation of President Tuđman in 1993, published in the Erasmus magazine.

Goldstein also argued that Tuđman was more a politician than a historian, and that history was interpreted according to his political views. For Goldstein, Tuđman was a solid personality who did not accept the uprising, that is, he flirted with some Greater Croatia ideas, but not with the Ustaša.

In 2007, Goldstein published the book 1941. – Godina koja se vraća ("1941 – The Year That Comes Back") for which he received the Cyclop Award for the Publicist Work of the Year. He founded the publishing house "Novi Liber".

For a time he was President of the Zagreb Jewish Community and of the "Cultural Society Miroslav Šalom Freiberger", and together with his son, Ivo, historian, advocated the reconstruction of the Zagreb Synagogue. Goldstein was then the first president of the Jewish religious community Beth Israel from Zagreb, founded in 2007 after an internal conflict in the Jewish community of Zagreb led by Ognjen Kraus.

In 2008, although he had stated that he would visit Bleiburg together with the SDP President Zoran Milanović, he finally renounced because he "did not want to hurt the feelings of people from my most intimate circle who pleaded me not to go to Bleiburg."

After the victory of the SDP-led coalition in the 2011 parliamentary elections, Goldstein became a special advisor for culture of the Croatian Prime Minister Zoran Milanović, as well as President of the Council of the Jasenovac Memorial Center. In 2011, together with his son Ivo he published the book Jasenovac i Bleiburg nisu isto ("Jasenovac and Bleiburg are not the same"). In this book, he opposes those who hold that "... Jasenovac and Bleiburg are simply two identical crimes with different ideological signs." In 2012, he supported the initiative of his brother Danko to abolish the parliamentary Bleiburg commemoration.

In 2015, Slavko Goldstein opposed the initiative to introduce the greeting Za dom spremni as an official greeting of the Armed Forces of Croatia. He stated that he would not be able to live in Croatia if the greeting was introduced in the military, schools or other state institutions, and that he would immediately seek political asylum in another European country.

Goldstein died on 13 September 2017.

== Works ==
- Okrug Karlovac 1941; (with I. Butković and M. Bekić), 1965
- Holokaust u Zagrebu; 2001
- 1941. – Godina koja se vraća; 2007
- Jasenovac i Bleiburg nisu isto; 2011 (with his son Ivo Goldstein)
- Tito; 2015 (with his son Ivo Goldstein)
