= Court Martial (1978 film) =

1978 film directed by Branko Ivanda

Court Martial (Prijeki sud) is a Croatian film directed by Branko Ivanda. It was released in 1978. The film is based on the eponymous novel by Žviko Jelićić.

== Plot ==
In 1943, in occupied Dalmatia, lawyer Dr. Toni Kolumbić, educated intellectual and aesthete, arrives at a fortress-castle converted into a prison. The lawyer is assigned to defend a group of prisoners at a trial. Eventually, Kolumbić learns from the president of the court that the prisoners will be shot, and there will be no trial. The lawyer must merely prepare a fictional report of the prosecution, defense, and proceedings as a simulation. Blackmailed, he undertakes the task. The film explores how the high-class Kolumbić easily accepts service to a totalitarian, fascist system, and his attempts to reconcile his newfound role with his self-image of a humanist.

== Reception ==
The film received a mostly negative rating in the Polish magazine "Film", where the reviewer says the utilized elements "lack internal coherence", and that the film's treatment of the issues are "cold" and that it "achieves virtually no artistic effect". Praise is given to the unique take on the Second World War as a part of Yugoslav cinema, and erudition shown through inspiration by The Trial, Desert of the Tartars, Salò, Artaud, and Arrabal.
