= Grgo Gamulin =

Croatian art historian, literary critic and writer

- Born: 21 August 1910; Jelsa, Kingdom of Dalmatia, Austria-Hungary (now Croatia)
- Died: 2 October 1997 (aged 87); Zagreb, Croatia
- Education: University of Zagreb
- Occupations: Art historian, literary critic, writer

Grgo Gamulin (21 August 1910 – 2 October 1997) was a Yugoslav art historian, literary critic, writer born in Jelsa on the island of Hvar. Gamulin graduated from the University of Zagreb in 1935 and lectured there in 1947–1971. He is a co-founder of the Art History Institute of the University of Zagreb and multiple journals (Ars 37, Radovi Odsjeka za povijest umjetnosti ("Works of the Art History Department", Život umjetnosti ("Life of Art")). Gamulin ranks among the forerunners of the Croatian contemporary art history. He published several novels and plays and translated Italian and French poetry. During the Croatian Spring, among many others, Gamulin was accused of stirring up Croatian nationalist views.
