= Handcuffs (film) =

- Croatian: Lisice
- Directed by: Krsto Papić
- Screenplay by: Mirko Kovač; Krsto Papić
- Starring: Fabijan Šovagović; Adem Čejvan
- Cinematography: Vjenceslav Orešković
- Release date: 1969
- Running time: 80 minutes
- Country: Yugoslavia
- Language: Croatian

Handcuffs (Croatian: Lisice) is a Yugoslav Croatian-language film directed by Krsto Papić. It was released in 1969.

== Premise ==
In the Dalmatian Hinterland in 1948, two UDBA members—Krešo and Ćazim—arrive at Ante and Višnja's village wedding. It is clear to everyone that they came to arrest someone on the grounds of being a Stalinist supporter. Tensions are rising during the wedding...

== Cast ==
- Fabijan Šovagović as Ante
- Adem Čejvan as Andrija
- Jagoda Kaloper as Višnja
- Ilija Ivezić as Krešo
- Fahro Konjhodžić as Ćazim
- Ivica Vidović as Musa
- Edo Peročević as Baletić
- Zaim Muzaferija as Todor
- Zlatko Madunić
- Rikard Brzeska
- Branko Špoljar as the teacher

== Awards ==
Due to its politically provocative content, Handcuffs was not allowed to compete for the Grand Prix at the 1970 Cannes Film Festival. However, after it was allegedly praised by the Yugoslav president Josip Broz Tito, the film won four Golden Arenas at the 1970 Pula Film Festival, including the Big Golden Arena for Best Film.

== Legacy ==
In 1999, a poll of Croatian film critics found Handcuffs to be one of the best Croatian films ever made.

In 2025, Jutarnji list wrote that Handcuffs was "one of rare Croatian feature films with a certain reputation worldwide." They further wrote: "The film's striking naturalistic style depicts the opportunistic mentality of the rural man who blindly obeys the dictates of the ruling ideology and customs."
