= Goli čovik =

- Directed by: Obrad Gluščević
- Production company: Jadran Film
- Release date: 1968
- Country: Croatia
- Language: Serbo-Croatian

Goli čovik (trans. Naked person or naked man - from local Ikavian) is a Croatian film directed by Obrad Gluščević and written by Ranko Marinković. The film was released in 1968 and stars Vera Čukić.

The film is listed in the Croatian film archive.

Goli čovik is the third of Gluščević's comedy trilogy revolving around rural Dalmatia and considered his most ambitious work by critics.
