= Sudar na paralelama =

- Directed by: Jože Babič
- Written by: Radivoje Lola Đukić
- Starring: Jelena Jovanović-Žigon; Mića Orlović; Boris Kralj; Ivona Petri; Olga Palinkaš; Andrea Šarić
- Cinematography: Nikola Majdak
- Edited by: Lida Braniš
- Music by: Borut Lesjak
- Production company: Jadran Film
- Release date: 18 July 1961
- Running time: 80 min.

Sudar na paralelama is a Croatian drama film directed by Jože Babič. It was released in 1961, and later selected for preservation by the Croatian State Archives. The film was released in SFR Yugoslavia, Bulgaria, Venezuela, Cuba, East Germany and Egypt.

== Plot summary ==
A man (Mića Orlović) returns home from a business trip to learn that his wife (Jelena Jovanović-Žigon) is supposed to go on a business trip of her own with her boss (Boris Kralj). He is jealous and, their relationship soured by previous fights, takes a lot of convincing to let her take the trip. However, as she leaves, he changes her mind and surreptitiously boards her train.

== Cast ==
- Jelena Jovanović-Žigon as wife
- Mića Orlović as husband
- Boris Kralj as the boss
- Olga Palinkaš as the flight attendant
- Andrea Sarić as girl in a dress
- Ivona Petri as grandmother
- Zlatko Madunić as train conductor
- Rudolf Kukić as man in the store
- Ljubo Dijan as man with the foxes
- Zoran Vuk as boy
