= Ante Peterlić =

Croatian screenwriter and film director

- Born: 18 May 1936; Kaštel Novi, Kingdom of Yugoslavia
- Died: 12 July 2007 (aged 71); Zagreb, Croatia

Ante Peterlić (18 May 1936 – 12 July 2007) was a Croatian film scholar, screenwriter and film director. He is best known for his film Accidental Life (Croatian: Slucajni zivot, 1969), his debut feature film.

== Career ==
Peterlić was a prominent young film critic, assistant director, script advisor and a professor of film theory at the Faculty of Humanities and Social Sciences in Zagreb. In the 1960s, he directed his first short TV drama, and was active as an assistant director in several feature films and documentaries, working also as a script doctor. First to hold Ph.D. in film studies in Yugoslavia, with prof. Vera Horvat-Pintarić serving as his thesis advisor, Peterlić wrote several books on theory and history of cinema.
