= Vuk samotnjak =

- Directed by: Obrad Gluščević
- Written by: Stjepan Perović, Obrad Gluščević
- Starring: Slavko Štimac, Ivan Štimac, Boro Ivanišević, Željko Mataija, Smiljan Čičić
- Music by: Bojan Adamič
- Release date: 1972
- Country: SFR Yugoslavia
- Language: Serbo-Croatian

Vuk samotnjak (transl. The Lone Wolf) is a 1972 Yugoslav children's film.
