= The Birch Tree =

- Croatian: Breza
- Directed by: Ante Babaja
- Written by: Slavko Kolar; Ante Babaja; Božidar Violić
- Story by: Slavko Kolar
- Based on: Breza and Ženidba Imre Futača by Slavko Kolar
- Starring: Manca Košir; Bata Živojinović; Fabijan Šovagović; Nela Eržišnik; Stane Sever; Stjepan Lektorić
- Cinematography: Tomislav Pinter
- Edited by: Lida Braniš
- Music by: Anđelko Klobučar
- Production company: Jadran Film
- Release date: 1967
- Running time: 92 minutes
- Country: SFR Yugoslavia
- Language: Croatian

The Birch Tree (Croatian: Breza) is a 1967 Yugoslav film directed by Ante Babaja.

The film won two Golden Arena awards at the 1967 Pula Film Festival, the Yugoslav national film awards, including Best Cinematography (Tomislav Pinter) and Best Actor (Bata Živojinović).

In 1999, a poll of Croatian film critics found it to be one of the best Croatian films ever made.
