= Signal Over the City =

1960 film

- Directed by: Žika Mitrović
- Release date: 1960
- Country: Yugoslavia
- Language: Serbo-Croatian

Signal Over the City (Serbo-Croatian: Signali nad gradom) is a 1960 Yugoslav film directed by Žika Mitrović. It is based on a screenplay by Slavko Goldstein.

== Plot ==
In Karlovac in 1941, Tomo, a member of the Partisan headquarters, and Pero, a resistance member, are captured by the Ustashe. A group of Partisans, led by commander Ranko, enters the town with the objective to rescue Tomo and Pero before they succumb to torture and give away information. On their way out of the town, they are tracked down by Ustasha major Lukarić. Finding themselves entrapped, the Partisans decide to attempt a risky breakthrough over a bridge...

== Cast ==
- Aleksandar Gavrić as Ranko
- Velimir Bata Živojinović as Tošo
- Ivo Šubić as Tomo
- Ivo Pajić as Pero
- Tonko Lonza as major Lukarić

== Background ==
The film is based on actual events that took place on 17 November 1941, when a group of 25 Partisans led by Većeslav Holjevac, disguised in Home Guard uniforms, entered Karlovac in order to rescue Marijan Čavić, a prominent Communist Party member captured by the Ustaše. Unbeknownst to Partisans, Čavić had already been transferred from the town hospital back to prison, so the actual raid, unlike its fictional counterpart, failed to achieve its objective. Nevertheless, it provided a morale boost for the anti-fascist resistance, as the event made the news on Radio London and Radio Moscow. According to Tatjana Holjevac daughter of Većeslav Holjevac, when Partisans entered Karlovac in reality they had Bosnian Fezzes on their heads and not as shown in the film, with Home Guard hats.

== Reception ==
The Croatian Film Association's database describes Signal Over the City as a prime example of the urban, action-based branch of Partisan film, noting clarity and refinement both in its plot development and direction.
