= Igre na skelama =

1961 film

Igre na skelama is a Croatian film directed by Srećko Weygand. It was released in 1961.
