= Tomislav Pinter =

Croatian cinematographer

- Born: 16 June 1926; Zagreb, Kingdom of Serbs, Croats, and Slovenes
- Died: 15 August 2008 (aged 82); Zagreb, Croatia
- Occupation: Cinematographer
- Years active: 1948–2006

Tomislav Pinter (16 June 1926 – 15 August 2008) was a Croatian and Yugoslav cinematographer, regarded as the most significant cinematographer in Croatian cinema due to the artistic quality of his work and his prolific career spanning almost five decades.

== Biography ==
After finishing high school Pinter enrolled at the Academy of Fine Arts Zagreb in 1946 to study painting, but he soon dropped out and devoted himself entirely to cinematography. He began working at the Jadran Film studio in 1945, at first assisting more experienced cinematographers, and in 1948 he started working independently. He started shooting documentary shorts in the early 1950s and his first feature was the 1960 film Point 905 (Kota 905, directed by Mate Relja).

Throughout the 1960s and onwards Pinter became the most prolific Croatian cinematographer, filming some 90 feature films, around 100 short films and some 10 television series. Some of his critically praised works include:

- In Vatroslav Mimica's 1965 film Prometheus of the Island, where he used a 10 ASA negative film stock which achieved a documentary feel of shots showing plot jumps in time,
- In Zvonimir Berković's 1966 film Rondo, where he used diffused lighting and shot composition to successfully illustrate characters' inner life,
- In Ante Babaja's 1967 film The Birch Tree, where he combined wide-angle and narrow-angle shots with saturated colors which together produced a visual style mimicking naïve painting.

Pinter received many awards for his work in film, including three Vladimir Nazor Awards and eight Golden Arena for Cinematography awards at the Pula Film Festival (the Yugoslav equivalent of Academy Awards), which made him by far the most decorated cinematographer in both Yugoslav and Croatian cinema. At the 4th Moscow International Film Festival, he won the award for Director of Photography for his work in Vatroslav Mimica's 1965 film Prometheus of the Island.

== Selected filmography ==
- Point 905 (1960)
- Alphabet of Fear (1961)
- Double Circle (1963)
- Three (1965)
- Prometheus of the Island (1965)
- Monday or Tuesday (1966)
- Rondo (1966)
- The Birch Tree (1967)
- I Even Met Happy Gypsies (1967)
- Battle of Neretva (1969)
- The Way to Paradise (1970)
- Timon (1973)
- The Battle of Sutjeska (1973)
- Private Vices, Public Pleasures (1976)
- The Widowhood of Karolina Zasler (1976)
- Snowstorm (1977)
- See You in the Next War (1980)
- Petria's Wreath (1980)
- The Melody Haunts My Memory (1981)
- Montenegro (1981)
- In the Jaws of Life (1984)
- Transylvania 6-5000 (1985)
- Dancing in Water (1987)
- Crusoe (1988)
- That Summer of White Roses (1989)
- The Meeting Point (1989)
- Silent Gunpowder (1990)
- Kontakt (2005)
- Libertas (2006)
