= Did a Good Man Die? =

1962 film by Fadil Hadžić

Did a Good Man Die? (Da li je umro dobar čovjek?) is a Croatian film directed by Fadil Hadžić and starring Boris Dvornik. It was released in 1962.

== Plot ==
Petar (Mile Gatara) is a pensioner who collects debts on behalf of a bank. In the course of his work, he accidentally brings together two young people, Miki (Boris Dvornik) and Maja (Ana Pavić). Petar chooses Miki for his associate, not knowing Miki is a debtor himself.
