= Alphabet of Fear =

1961 film

- Film poster
- Directed by: Fadil Hadžić
- Starring: Vesna Bojanić
- Cinematography: Tomislav Pinter
- Edited by: Radojka Ivančević
- Music by: Bojan Adamič
- Production company: Jadran Film
- Release date: 27 November 1961 (Yugoslavia)
- Running time: 98 minutes
- Country: Yugoslavia
- Language: Croatian

Alphabet of Fear (Croatian: Abeceda straha) is a 1961 Croatian film directed by Fadil Hadžić.
