= Oktavijan Miletić =

Croatian filmmaker (1902–1987)

- Born: 1 October 1902; Zagreb, Austria-Hungary
- Died: 17 August 1987 (aged 84); Zagreb, SFR Yugoslavia
- Occupations: Cinematographer, film director
- Years active: 1932–1978
- Awards: Vladimir Nazor Award for Life Achievement in Film (1967)

Oktavijan Miletić (1 October 1902 – 17 August 1987) was a Croatian and Yugoslav cinematographer and film director. His avant-garde work in the period from 1928 to 1945 remains as one of the foundations of Croatian film.

== Career ==
Miletić was born in Zagreb. He was one of the founders of the Zagreb film club in 1928.

Miletić participated in an amateur film competition in Paris in 1933 with his Poslovi konzula Dorgena and received an award from Louis Lumière. His 1937 film Šešir was the first Croatian movie filmed with sound. In the Independent State of Croatia, Miletić filmed three cultural films for Germany's Tobis Film: Hrvatski kipari, Hrvatski seljački život and Agram, die Hauptstadt Kroatiens. While all three films were originally thought lost, Daniel Rafaelić discovered Hrvatski seljački život in a Vienna film archive in 2004 and in 2008 discovered Agram, die Hauptstadt Kroatiens in a German film archive.

In 1942 he filmed Barok u Hrvatskoj, about the life of count Janko Drašković. In 1944 Miletić filmed the full-length feature Lisinski about the Croatian composer Vatroslav Lisinski. He spent the waning months of the Second World War working to safekeep the films of the Croatian state institute Hrvatski slikopis.

In 1967 he received the Vladimir Nazor Award for lifetime achievement in film arts. He died in Zagreb.

== Legacy ==
The Oktavijan Award is awarded annually by the Croatian Association of Film Critics as part of the Days of Croatian Film.

== Filmography ==
- Amadeus Nickelnagel (1932)
- Most (1938)
- Barok u Hrvatskoj (1942)
- Agram, die Hauptstadt Kroatiens (1943)
- Lisinski (1944)
