= Ivo Goldstein =

Croatian historian, author and ambassador

Doctor Ivo Goldstein
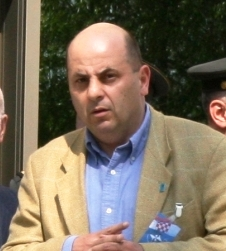
- Goldstein in 2009
- Born: March 16, 1958 (age 68); Zagreb, PR Croatia, Yugoslavia
- Citizenship: Croatian
- Occupation: university professor
- Spouse: Sanja Petrušić Goldstein
- Children: 2
- Parent: Slavko Goldstein
- Relatives: Danijel Ivin (uncle)

Ivo Goldstein (Hebrew: איבו גולדשטיין; born 16 March 1958) is a historian, author and ambassador from Croatia. Goldstein is a recipient of the Order of Danica Hrvatska (2007) and the City of Zagreb Award (2005).

== Biography ==
=== Education ===
Ivo Goldstein graduated from the Classical Gymnasium in Zagreb and in 1976 he enrolled into undergraduate History studies at the Faculty of Humanities and Social Sciences, University of Zagreb where he graduated in 1979.

In 1988, he received his doctorate from the Faculty of Philosophy, University of Belgrade in what was then Yugoslav constituent Socialist Republic of Serbia. His doctoral thesis was entitled ″Byzantium on the Adriatic from Justinian I to Basil II (6th-9th Century)″. On three occasions he spent a longer study abroad or research periods at the prestigious School for Advanced Studies in the Social Sciences in Paris (1981/1982), at the National and Kapodistrian University of Athens (1987/1988) and the Imre Kertész Kolleg at the University of Jena (2011).

=== Religious life ===
He is a former president of Bet Israel, a Jewish community in Zagreb, which he founded with his father, historian Slavko Goldstein. They are both involved with the reconstruction of the Zagreb Synagogue.

== Academic and Political Career ==
=== Academic career ===
In 1980 Goldstein was appointed assistant trainee at the Faculty of Humanities and Social Sciences at the department for medieval history. He defended his Master's degree in 1984 under the title ″Historiographical criteria of Procopius of Caesarea″. Since 2001 he is a full professor at the Faculty of Humanities and Social Sciences in Zagreb. His area of expertise is Byzantium and Croatian history in the Middle Ages, especially the early Middle Ages, as well as history of the Jews in Croatia and the Croatian history of 20th century. Over the years he also taught at the University of Osijek, University of Rijeka, University of Split and the University of Mostar. Goldstein is a permanent contributor for the Miroslav Krleža Institute of Lexicography where he has been the main editor for the entire field of history since 2003.

=== Ambassadorship to France and UNESCO ===
In 2012 Goldstein was named as ambassador of Croatia to France and UNESCO. In 2017, his terms as ambassador to France and Croatia's permanent delegate to UNESCO ended when he was succeeded by professional diplomat Filip Vučak.

== Works ==
- Bizant na Jadranu (1992)
- Hrvatski rani srednji vijek (1995)
- Croatia: A History (1999) [London: Hurst & Company]
- Holokaust u Zagrebu (2001)
- Židovi u Zagrebu 1918.-1941. (2005)
- Europa i Sredozemlje u srednjem vijeku (2006)
- Hrvatska 1918.-2008.(2008)
- Tito (2015)
- The Holocaust in Croatia (2016)
- Kontroverze hrvatske povijesti 20. stoljeća (2019)
