= Paul Mojzes =

Yugoslavia-born American academic

- Born: 10 November 1936 (age 89); Osijek, Yugoslavia
- Education: University of Belgrade; Florida Southern College BA; Boston University PhD
- Occupations: Professor emeritus Religious studies scholar
- Notable work: Balkan Genocides: Holocaust and Ethnic Cleansing in the Twentieth Century

Paul Mojzes (born 10 November 1936) is an academic who is professor emeritus of Religious Studies at Rosemont College.

== Education and career ==
Mojzes was born in Osijek and grew up in Novi Sad, Yugoslavia. Upon graduation from the gymnasium in Novi Sad, he studied at the University of Belgrade Faculty of Law before coming to the United States in 1957. He received his B.A. from Florida Southern College in 1959 and doctorate in Eastern European Church History from Boston University in 1965. As well as teaching, Mojzes was also chair of the Religious Studies and Humanities Department at Rosemont College.

He was the co-editor of the Journal of Ecumenical Studies, and founder and co-editor of Occasional Papers on Religion in Eastern Europe. Additionally, he was the interim director of the Gratz College Holocaust and Genocide Studies doctoral program and continues to teach at Gratz as an adjunct professor. He was also distinguished visiting professor of Holocaust and genocide studies at Richard Stockton College. He is a member of the United Methodist Church.

== Books ==
- Varieties of Christian-Marxist dialogue (Ecumenical Press, 1978). ISBN 978-0-93121-402-8
- Christian-Marxist dialogue in Eastern Europe (Augsburg Fortress, 1981). ISBN 978-0-80661-895-1
- Religious Liberty in Eastern Europe and the USSR (East European Monographs, 1992). ISBN 978-0-88033-234-7
- Yugoslavian Inferno: Ethnoreligious Warfare in the Balkans (Continuum, 1994). ISBN 978-0-82640-683-5
- Religion and the War in Bosnia (Scholars, 1998). ISBN 978-0-78850-428-0
- Balkan Genocides: Holocaust and Ethnic Cleansing in the Twentieth Century (Rowman & Littlefield, 2011). ISBN 978-1-44220-665-6
