= Baroque in Croatia =

1942 film

- Barok u Hrvatskoj
- Directed by: Oktavijan Miletić
- Written by: Josip Horvat
- Starring: Tito Strozzi, Marija Crnobori
- Distributed by: Hrvatski Slikopis
- Release date: 1942
- Language: Croatian

Baroque in Croatia (Barok u Hrvatskoj) is a 1942 documentary short directed by Oktavijan Miletić about the life of Janko Drašković. Music for the film was produced by Croatian composer Boris Papandopulo.
