= Anđelko Klobučar =

Croatian composer and organist

Anđelko Klobučar (11 July 1931 – 7 August 2016), was a Croatian composer, organist and music pedagogue.

Born in Zagreb, Klobučar studied at the Zagreb Academy of Music and later in Salzburg and Paris, where he studied composition with André Jolivet. His older brother Berislav Klobučar became successful conductor. Anđelko became titular organist of the Zagreb Cathedral in 1958 and played until 2004. From 1987 he shared this position with Hvalimira Bledšnajder. He worked as the organ professor at the Zagreb Academy of Music for only two years, 1972 and 1973. His organ students were Hvalimira Bledšnajder (1972), Jesenka Tješić (1972) and Krešimir Galin (1973).

He was awarded the Vladimir Nazor Award for Life Achievement in Music in 1995 and the Porin Lifetime Achievement Award in 2002. Klobučar was a full member of the Croatian Academy of Sciences and Arts since 1992.

== See also ==
- Woof-Woof

== Sources ==
- Akademik Anđelko Klobučar (in Croatian)
- Anđelko Klobučar at hdu.hr (in Croatian)
- Anđelko Klobučar at film.hr (in Croatian)
