= Kaya (film) =

- Directed by: Vatroslav Mimica
- Written by: Kruno Quien; Vatroslav Mimica
- Starring: Zaim Muzaferija; Uglješa Kojadinović; Antun Nalis; Jolanda Ðačić; Izet Hajdarhodžić; Husein Čokić
- Cinematography: Frano Vodopivec
- Production company: Jadran Film
- Release date: July 12, 1967
- Running time: 87 minutes
- Country: Yugoslavia
- Language: Serbo-Croatian

Kaya, also known as Kaya, I'll Kill You (Croatian: Kaja, ubit ću te!) is a 1967 Yugoslav feature film directed by Vatroslav Mimica.

In 1999, a poll of Croatian film critics found it to be one of the best Croatian films ever made.
