= Rondo (1966 film) =

- The film's plot centers on a love triangle between Neda (Milena Dravić, left), her husband Fedja (Relja Bašić, center) and Mladen (Stevo Žigon, right).
- Directed by: Zvonimir Berković
- Written by: Zvonimir Berković
- Starring: Relja Bašić; Milena Dravić; Stevo Žigon
- Cinematography: Tomislav Pinter
- Edited by: Radojka Tanhofer
- Release date: 1966
- Running time: 95 minutes
- Country: Yugoslavia
- Language: Croatian

Rondo is a 1966 Yugoslavian film by Croatian director Zvonimir Berković. It was filmed in Zagreb, Croatia (then a part of Socialist Federal Republic of Yugoslavia).

== Plot ==
One Sunday, the lonely bachelor and sophisticated judge Mladen arrives to the apartment of his friend, the sculptor Fedja. The two men are chess fanatics and want to play through the entire afternoon. At the apartment, Mladen meets Fedja's wife Neda and becomes smitten by her. She is not interested in chess, but seems to love his husband very much. At night, the couple invites Mladen to dinner, and the three talk about chess, love and music. Mladen learns that Leda used to study classical music. She knows how to play the piano, but lost the love for doing that a long time ago. They decide to repeat that routine every Sunday, and with time their bond grows stronger. Both Mladen and Neda start showing signs of attraction towards each other. He buys her recordings of musicians performing pieces by Mozart, and the two connect through their love of classical music. One night, during a moment in which they are left alone, he decides to kiss her. Neda does not resist the kiss, but does not comment on it either. At the end of the night, she simply says goodbye to him.

Things become more tense afterwards. Mladen and Neda start acting more aggressively towards each other, and they are also more distant with Fedja, who starts to suspect something is going on.

A Sunday, Neda decides to secretly visit Mladen at a bar he frequents. At the same time, Mladen goes to Fedja's apartment to talk things out with her. Despite failing to rendezvous, they both get to talk to Fedja at different moments in the day and notice their behaviour is taking a toll on him.

Neda starts ignoring Mladen at every chance she gets, so he decides to break the pattern and visit the couple on a Saturday with the excuse of celebrating his birthday. In the ensuing party, Neda confesses to Mladen that she has feelings for him. While a very drunk Fedja is distracted setting up fireworks for the celebration, Neda and Mladen make love.

Realizing he not only loves Neda but both of his friends, Mladen decides to stop visiting them, not wanting to destroy their marriage. Meanwhile, Neda tells Fedja what happened, and he forgives her.

A Sunday, Fedja invites Mladen to another afternoon of chess. After the two hash things out, Mladen accepts the invitation. Fedja, Mladen and Neda spend that Sunday like they used to, and resume their relationship.

== Cast ==
- Relja Bašić as Fedja
- Stevo Žigon as Mladen
- Milena Dravić as Neda
- Zvonimir Rogoz
- Boris Festini
- Rudolf Kukić

== Background and themes ==
Produced in 1966, Rondo was the first full-length film by former musician and screenwriter Zvonimir Berković, screenwriter of H-8, a famous Croatian 1950s classic. In both films, he uses musical form as a source for the narrative. As in Mozart's Rondo (which is repeatedly played in the soundtrack) in Berković's film the basic situation - Sunday afternoon chess party - is repeated with small variations, slowly bringing the three character towards a crisis. Very formal, very intimistic and set in a cosy middle-class environment, Rondo was very different from previous Yugoslav film tradition, introducing aesthetic of the modernist psychological novel into Croatian cinema.

== Reception ==
Rondo is still considered as one of three biggest classics of Croatian 1960s modernism.

In 1999, a poll of Croatian film critics found it to be one of the best Croatian films ever made.

== Awards ==
For her portrayal of Neda, Milena Dravić won a Silver Arena Award for "Best Actress" at the (1966) Pula Film Festival.

== See also ==
- List of Yugoslavian films
