= Point 905 =

- Directed by: Mate Relja
- Written by: Milutin Jankovic
- Release date: 1960
- Running time: 85 minutes
- Country: Yugoslavia
- Language: Croatian

Point 905 (Kota 905) is a Yugoslav film in Croatian directed by Mate Relja. It was released in 1960.

== Plot ==
After World War II, a Yugoslav People's Army captain, Vladimir, is in charge of suppressing armed supporters of the former king, Peter II of Yugoslavia, led by major Momir. After Vladimir's best friend is killed, he joins the rebels pretending to be one of the king's supporters. However, one of Momir's supporters, a man who harbors rebels, has an attractive daughter who is engaged to marry Momir. She knows that Vladimir is an officer of the Yugoslav army, because she has seen him wearing a Yugoslav uniform. Vladimir fears that she might betray him.
