= Prometheus of the Island =

- Directed by: Vatroslav Mimica
- Written by: Vatroslav Mimica; Slavko Goldstein; Krunoslav Quien
- Starring: Slobodan Dimitrijević; Janez Vrhovec; Mira Sardoč; Dina Rutić; Pavle Vuisić
- Cinematography: Tomislav Pinter
- Edited by: Katja Majer
- Music by: Miljenko Prohaska
- Production company: Jadran Film
- Release date: 1964
- Running time: 92 minutes
- Country: Yugoslavia
- Language: Serbo-Croatian

Prometheus of the Island (Serbo-Croatian: Prometej s otoka Viševice), also known in English as Prometheus from the island of Viševica, is a 1964 Yugoslav film directed by Vatroslav Mimica.

It won the Big Golden Arena for Best Film at the 1965 Pula Film Festival (shared with Aleksandar Petrović's film Three). The film was also entered into the 4th Moscow International Film Festival winning a Special Diploma.
