= Branko Ivanda =

Croatian film director (1941–2025)

Branko Ivanda (25 December 1941 – 20 November 2025) was a Croatian film director and screenwriter.

== Life and career ==
Ivanda was born in Split, then under Italian occupation. His father Leo was a high-school professor of Croatian and French language and his mother Dunja a clerk. The family had artistic leanings, as Ivanda's grandfather was an actor in the Croatian National Theatre in Split (HNK), while his uncle-in-law was composer Ivo Tijardović. Ivanda completed the classical gymnasium in his hometown, occasionally playing minor roles in the HNK, but as he preferred directing, he entered the Academy of Dramatic Arts of the University of Zagreb where he graduated.

His directing debut was 1969 modernist piece Gravitacija ili fantastična mladost činovnika Borisa Horvata. Following the ban of his documentary about 1971 student demonstrations Poezija i revolucija - studentski štrajk 1971, in the 1970s he focused on television, where he would direct films, dramas, documentary and advertising films for over thirty years. He also accepted occasional theater projects. For his TV and fiction films he received several awards, notably FIPRESCI from the Berlin Film Festival. He has been a dean of the Academy of Dramatic Arts in Zagreb since 2004.

Ivanda married twice: from the first marriage with Stanka, he had son Nikola, who was also a director and Branko's close assistant in multiple TV projects, such as popular series Obični ljudi, Ponos Ratkajevih, Sve će biti dobro and Dolina sunca. Nikola died from heart attack in 2012, at the age of 36. From his second marriage with producer Lidija he has two children. Ivanda died on 20 November 2025, at the age of 83.

== Filmography ==
- Gravitacija ili fantastična mladost činovnika Borisa Horvata (1968)
- Drveni sanduk Tomasa Vulfa (1974) (TV)
- Slučaj maturanta Wagnera (1976) (TV)
- Rabija (1977) (documentary)
- Bombaški proces (1978) (TV)
- Prijeki sud (1978)
- Posljednja večera (1978) (documentary)
- Zločin u školi (1982)
- U logoru (1983) (TV drama)
- Noć poslije smrti (1983)
- Pet mrtvih adresa (1984) (TV drama)
- Poezija i revolucija - studentski štrajk 1971 (1971-2000) (documentary)
- Dubrovački škerac (2001)
- Konjanik (2003)
- Ljubav u zaleđu (2005) (TV series)
- Obični ljudi (2006) (TV series)
- Ponos Ratkajevih (2007) (TV series)
- Lea i Darija (2011)
