= Obrad Gluščević =

Film director

- Born: 17 January 1913; Metković, Kingdom of Dalmatia, Austria-Hungary
- Died: 5 September 1980 (aged 67); Zagreb, SR Croatia, SFR Yugoslavia
- Occupations: Film director, screenwriter
- Years active: 1948–1980

Obrad Gluščević (17 January 1913 – 5 September 1980) was a Croatian film director. He wrote and directed around twenty documentaries, five feature films and two television series.

Born in Metković, Gluščević first began acting in theatres in nearby Dubrovnik. His first notable works were documentary and live-action shorts made in the 1950s and 1960s, some of which won awards at film festivals in Venice, Cannes, Oberhausen and Belgrade.

In the mid-1960s Gluščević turned to making feature films, and made three comedies which depict life in rural Dalmatia: Lito vilovito (1964), Čovik od svita (1965) and Goli čovik (1968). After that he directed two children's films (Vuk samotnjak in 1972 and Kapetan Mikula Mali in 1974). Mikula Mali was later expanded into a television series aired in 1976. Gluščević also authored the popular Yugoslav children's TV series Jelenko in 1980 produced by the Radiotelevision Zagreb.

Gluščević was honoured with the Vladimir Nazor Award for life achievement in film in 1978, two years before his death in September 1980.
