= Mladen Bašić =

Croatian pianist and conductor

Mladen Bašić (1 August 1917, Zagreb - 21 November 2012, Zagreb) was a Croatian pianist and conductor.

== Life and works ==
Mladen Bašić studied piano, conducting and composition in the Zagreb Conservatory. His music career began in 1940 as a répétiteur. Since 1945 he worked as the conductor for the Opera of the Croatian National Theatre in Zagreb, where from 1955 to 1958 he also worked as the opera director.

In 1959 he was invited to be the Opera Director for the Salzburger Landestheater in Salzburg. A year later he was employed as main conductor for the Mozarteum Orchestra of Salzburg. From 1962 to 1972 he was permanent invited conductor in the Gran Teatre del Liceu of Barcelona. In 1967 and 1968, Bašić was appointed as the main conductor of the Frankfurt Opera.

From 1968 to 1970 he returned to work again in Croatia, this time as the music director of the summer festival "Splitsko ljeto" and as the opera director of the Croatian National Theatre in Split. From 1970 to 1978 he was the permanent director and programming supervisor of the Zagreb Philharmonic Orchestra, where he had a cooperation with the main conductor of that time, Lovro von Matačić. In 1978 he was invited to Mainz, where he worked until 1990 as the music general manager.

As a conductor Mladen Bašić performed in many European concert halls.

He also performed many premieres of Croatian contemporary composers, such as the premiere of Boris Papandopulo's dramatic oratorio Marulova pisan, and first performances in his country of the best known works of Maurice Ravel, Benjamin Britten, Sergei Prokofiev, Igor Stravinski, Florent Schmitt and Béla Bartók.

== Awards ==
- In 1997 Mladen Bašić received the Vladimir Nazor Award for Life Achievement in Music, given by the Croatian Ministry of Culture in acknowledgement of his professional career.
- In 1998 he received the Tito Strozzi prize from the Croatian National Theatre of Zagreb for the performance of Benjamin Britten's opera The Rape of Lucretia.
- In 2006 he received the "Lovro von Matačić" prize, given by the Croatian Association of Academical Musicians (in Croatian: HDGU), in acknowledgement of his music career.

== Bibliography ==
- Kovačević, Krešimir (1971). "Bašić, Mladen". In Kovačević, K. (ed.). Muzička enciklopedija (in Croatian). Vol. 1. Zagreb: Yugoslav Lexicographical Institute. p. 149.
- Požgaj, Višnja (2006). Šeput, L.; Jelača, M. (eds.). "Karijera ostvarenih želja". Vijenac (in Croatian) (312). Zagreb: Matica hrvatska.
