= Lisinski (film) =

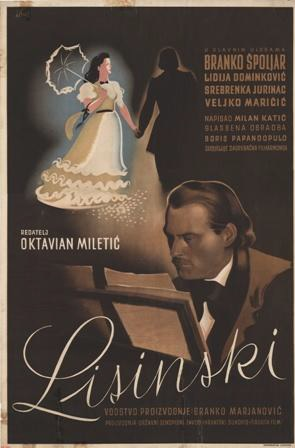
- Directed by: Oktavijan Miletić
- Written by: Milan Katić
- Starring: Branko Špoljar; Srebrenka Jurinac
- Distributed by: Hrvatski Slikopis
- Release date: 1944
- Running time: 85 min
- Country: Croatia
- Language: Croatian

Lisinski is a 1944 film directed by Oktavijan Miletić about the life of Croatian composer Vatroslav Lisinski. Music for the film was recorded by Boris Papandopulo.

A restored copy of the film was released in 2009. Jutarnji list declared the movie the best Croatian release of the year.

== Background ==
Lisinki was the first Croatian film and only full-length feature film produced in the Independent State of Croatia (NDH). The film told the life story of Vatroslav Lisinski, in particular the last fourteen years of his life as a composer and included elements of a lavish philharmonic performance by the Croatian National Orchestra. The film's narrative mirrored the nationalistic narrative of the NDH, incorporating elements of the Croatian national awakening. Filming of Lisinki began in 1943 and despite private backlash by the Ustaše who perceived the film would violate their anti-Semitic policies, the film was a success and was well received by the public. Lisinki ran in cinemas across Zagreb for three months and shown across a number of cities including Karlovac, Osijek, Mostar and Split.
