= Čovik od svita =

1965 film directed by Obrad Gluščević

Čovik od svita is a Croatian film directed by Obrad Gluščević, starring Boris Dvornik and Milena Dravić. It was released in 1965.
