= Ante Babaja =

Croatian film director and screenwriter (1927–2010)

- Born: 6 October 1927; Imotski, Kingdom of Yugoslavia
- Died: 14 January 2010 (aged 82); Zagreb, Croatia
- Occupations: Film director, screenwriter
- Years active: 1949–2010

Ante Babaja (6 October 1927 – 14 January 2010) was a Croatian film director and screenwriter.

== Education and Career ==
Babaja finished high school in Zagreb before going on to enrol at the University of Zagreb where he studied law and economy. He started working in filmmaking in 1949, and his first job was as assistant director to Krešimir Golik on the making of Golik's 1950 feature film Blue 9 (Plavi 9). Babaja's directorial debut was the 1955 documentary short Jedan dan u Rijeci. He went on to film several short films before directing is first feature film The King's New Clothes (Carevo novo ruho) in 1961, a screen adaptation of Hans Christian Andersen's short tale.

In the mid-1960s Babaja made several experimental documentary films, before filming The Birch Tree (Breza, 1967), his most well known film which is today regarded as one of the classic films of Croatian cinema. In the following decades Babaja turned to direct documentary films and only made a handful of feature films. Nevertheless, films such as Gold, Frankincense and Myrrh (Mirisi, zlato i tamjan, 1971) and Lost Homeland (Izgubljeni zavičaj, 1980) were also met with considerable critical acclaim.

He was also a longtime professor at the Zagreb Academy of Drama Arts and in 1988 he was awarded the Vladimir Nazor Award for Life Achievement.

== Filmography ==
- The King's New Clothes (Carevo novo ruho, 1961)
- The Birch Tree (Breza, 1967)
- Gold, Frankincense and Myrrh (Mirisi, zlato i tamjan, 1971)
- Lost Homeland (Izgubljeni zavičaj, 1980)
- The Stone Gate (Kamenita vrata, 1992)
