= Croatian Film Association =

The Croatian Film Association (Croatian: Hrvatski filmski savez, HFS), also known as the Croatian Film Clubs' Association, is an association of non-professional film and video groups in Croatia.

Croatian Film Association was established in 1963. Since 1992, it is a member of Union Internationale du Cinéma (UNICA). The association's president is Hrvoje Turković.

Croatian Film Association produced or co-produced a number of documentary and feature films. Notable feature films produced by the HFS include What Is a Man Without a Moustache? (2005), an award-winning comedy, and A Letter to My Father (2012), winner of the Big Golden Arena for Best Film at the Pula Film Festival.

== See also ==
- Cinema of Croatia
