= Vatroslav Mimica =

Croatian film director (1923–2020)

- Born: 25 June 1923; Omiš, Kingdom of Serbs, Croats and Slovenes
- Died: 15 February 2020 (aged 96); Zagreb, Croatia
- Occupations: Director, writer
- Years active: 1952–1981
- Spouse: Giovanna Gezzan
- Children: Sergio

Vatroslav Mimica (25 June 1923 – 15 February 2020) was a Croatian film director and screenwriter.

== Early life ==
Born in Omiš, Mimica had enrolled at the University of Zagreb School of Medicine before the outbreak of World War II. In 1942 he joined Young Communist League of Yugoslavia (SKOJ) and in 1943 he went on to join the Yugoslav Partisans, becoming a member of their medical units.

== Career ==
After the war Mimica wrote literary and film reviews, and his career in filmmaking began in 1950 when he became the director of the Jadran Film production studio.

=== Animation ===
He had his directorial and screenwriting debut in the 1952 Yugoslav film In the Storm (Croatian: U oluji) which starred Veljko Bulajić, Mia Oremović and Antun Nalis. In the 1950s Mimica worked as a director and writer on a number of critically acclaimed animated films and became a prominent member of the Zagreb School of Animated Films (his 1958 animated short film The Loner (Samac) was awarded the Venice Grand Prix), along with authors such as Vlado Kristl and Academy Award-winning Dušan Vukotić. In 1963 he directed Typhoid Sufferers (Tifusari), a short experimental film based on Jure Kaštelan's poem of the same title.

=== Feature film ===
In the 1960s Mimica moved away from animation (his last animated film was 1971 film The Firemen (Vatrogasci)) and turned to directing feature films, starting with the 1961 Yugoslav-Italian film Suleiman the Conqueror (Italian: Solimano il conquistatore) starring Edmund Purdom and Giorgia Moll. His 1965 film Prometheus of the Island (Prometej s otoka Viševice) won the Big Golden Arena for Best Film at the 1965 Pula Film Festival and earned Mimica a runner-up Silver Arena award for Best Director. It was also entered into the 4th Moscow International Film Festival winning a Special Diploma.

The following year his 1966 film Monday or Tuesday (Ponedjeljak ili utorak) also won the Big Golden Arena for Best Film and Mimica won the Golden Arena for Best Director.

Mimica made several other films through the 1970s, most notably the period films Anno Domini 1573 (Peasant revolt of 1573) - Seljačka buna 1573. in Croatian - depicting the 16th century Croatian-Slovenian peasant revolt, and The Falcon (Banović Strahinja), set in 14th century Serbia, before retiring from filmmaking in 1981.

== Personal life ==
His son Sergio Mimica-Gezzan is an American film and television director.

== Filmography ==
- The Jubilee of Mr Ikel (Jubilej gospodina Ikla, 1955)
- Suleiman the Conqueror (Solimano il conquistatore, 1961)
- Prometheus of the Island (Prometej s otoka Viševice, 1964)
- Monday or Tuesday (Ponedjeljak ili utorak, 1966)
- Kaya (Kaja, ubit ću te!, 1967)
- An Event (Događaj, 1969)
- The Fed One (Hranjenik, 1970)
- The Macedonian Part of Hell (Makedonskiot del od pekolot, 1971)
- Anno Domini 1573 (Seljačka buna 1573, 1975)
- The Last Mission of Demolitions Man Cloud (Posljednji podvig diverzanta Oblaka, 1978)
- The Falcon (Banović Strahinja, 1981)
