= List of Croatian films of the 1950s =

This is a list of the feature films produced in Croatia in the 1950s.

For an alphabetical list of articles on Croatian films see Category:Croatian films.

English title	Croatian title	Director(s)	Company	Main cast
1950
	Plavi 9	Krešo Golik	Jadran	Antun Nalis, Irena Kolesar
1951
	Bakonja fra Brne	Fedor Hanžeković	Jadran	
1952
	Ciguli miguli	Branko Marjanović	Jadran	
	U oluji	Vatroslav Mimica	Jadran	
1953
	Kameni horizonti	Šime Šimatović	Jadran	
	Sinji galeb	Branko Bauer	Jadran	
1954
	Koncert	Branko Belan	Jadran	
1955
The Girl and the Oak	Djevojka i hrast	Krešo Golik	Jadran	
Millions on the Island	Milioni na otoku	Branko Bauer	Jadran	
The Jubilee of Mr Ikel	Jubilej gospodina Ikla	Vatroslav Mimica	Jadran	
1956
The Siege	Opsada	Branko Marjanović	Jadran	
Don't Look Back, My Son	Ne okreći se sine	Branko Bauer	Jadran	
1957
It Was Not in Vain	Nije bilo uzalud	Nikola Tanhofer	Jadran	
Only People	Samo ljudi	Branko Bauer	Jadran	
Master of His Own Body	Svoga tela gospodar	Fedor Hanžeković	Jadran	
We're Going Separate Ways	Naši se putovi razilaze	Šime Šimatović	Jadran	
1958
The Road a Year Long	Cesta duga godinu dana	Giuseppe De Santis	Jadran	
H-8	H-8	Nikola Tanhofer	Jadran	
1959
Train Without a Timetable	Vlak bez voznog reda	Veljko Bulajić	Jadran	
Heaven Without Love	Pukotina raja	Vladimir Pogačić	Jadran	

== See also ==
- List of Croatian films of the 1960s
- 1950s in Croatian television
- Yugoslavia in the Eurovision Song Contest
