= Nela Eržišnik =

Croatian actress and comedian

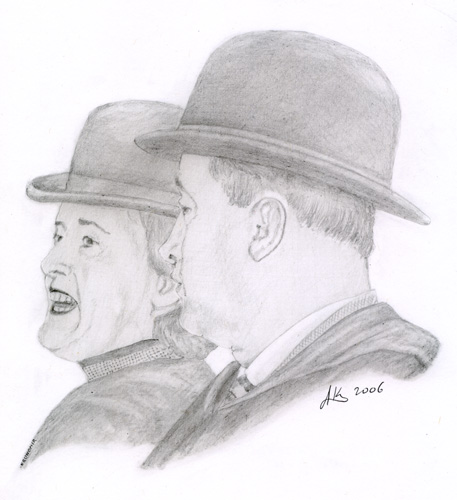
- A portrait of Eržišnik (left) and Braco Reiss
- Born: Nevenka Maras; 18 June 1922; Banja Luka, Kingdom of Serbs, Croats and Slovenes
- Died: 14 August 2007 (aged 85); Volosko, Croatia
- Other name: Marija Blažević
- Occupation: Actress
- Years active: 1953–present
- Spouses: Ivo Eržišnik; Zvonimir Blažević (m. 1952)
- Awards: Order of Danica Hrvatska

Nevenka "Nela" Eržišnik (née Maras; 18 June 1922 – 14 August 2007) was a Croatian actress.

Born in Banja Luka as Nevenka Maras, she appeared in some classic Croatian films of the 1950s and early 1960s. Later, she switched to television and built a reputation as one of the rare female stand-up comedians in Croatia or Yugoslavia. Her most memorable character was that of cleaning lady Marica Hrdalo.

== Filmography ==
Year	Title	Role	Notes
1953	Sinji galeb	Mare	
1954	Koncert	Barbara	
1955	Jubilej gospodina Ikla	Flora Krkac	
1956	Don't Look Back, My Son	Zena na prozoru	
1957	Only People	Tetka Ema	
1957	Master of His Own Body	Bara	
1958	H-8	Sestra gospodina Jakupeca	
1960	Signali nad gradom	Gazdarica	
1961	Martin in the Clouds	Prevarena zena	
1967	The Birch Tree	Markova mater	
