= Ljudevit Vukotinović =

Croatian politician, writer and naturalist

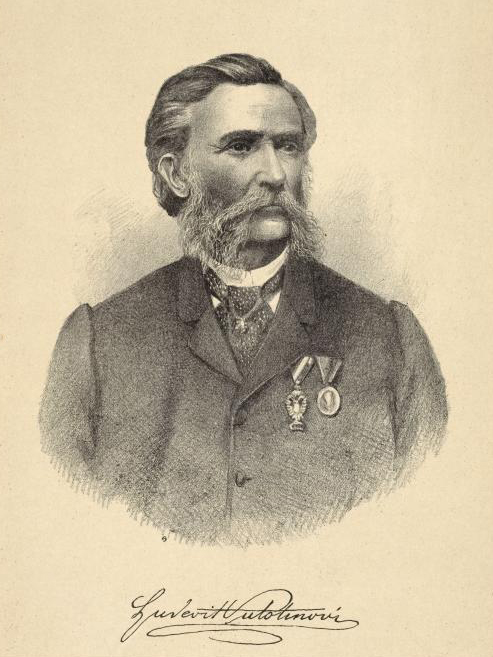
A painting of Ljudevit Vukotinović with a signature.

Ljudevit Farkaš Vukotinović (13 January 1813 – 17 March 1893) was a Croatian politician, writer and naturalist.

He was born in Zagreb. He studied philosophy in Szombathely, and law in Zagreb and Bratislava, where he graduated. In 1836, he was a trainee at the Tabula Banalis and, after passing the bar exam in 1836, was appointed as a sub-notary of Križevci County and, in 1840, as the Grand Judge in Moslavina Kotar. As a representative of the Croatian Parliament, where he had served since 1847, he was responsible, along with Ivan Kukuljević Sakcinski, for the declaration of Croatian as the official language in 1847.

During the Revolutions of 1848 in the Austrian Empire, he served as the supreme commander of the armies in Križevci County, securing the defense on the river of Drava and in Međimurje, and publishing reports from the front lines in Slavenski jug. In 1849–1854, he served as the president of the Regional Court in Križevci until his forced retirement due to his opposition to the introduction of German as the official language. After the fall of Bach's absolutism, he served in Ban's Conference in 1860 and as the Grand Župan of Križevci County in 1861–1867. Although, he was appointed as a representative in the Croatian Parliament as a member of the People's Party in 1871, he soon turned Unionist, and has not entered the civil service ever since.

As a political writer, Vukotinović made appearance with Ilirizam i kroatizam ("Illyrism and Croatim", 1842), an essay in which he debated on the cultural and linguistic unity of South Slavs based on their ethnic unity, and the struggle for an independent position of Croatia within the Kingdom of Hungary and the Habsburg monarchy. In the dissertation Regni Slavoniae erga Hungarium legalis correlatio ("The legal relationship between the Kingdom of Slavonia to Hungary", 1845), he opposed the Hungarian encroachments of three Slavonian counties (Virovitica, Syrmia and Požega counties), stressing the state unity of Croatia, Slavonia and Dalmatia. During the Revolutions of 1848, he published a brochure, Nekoja glavna pitanja našeg vremena ("Some major issues of our time"), in which he pointed out the contemporary political issues in Croatia, while in the brochure Godina 1850. u Hrvatskoj ("The year 1850 in Croatia", 1851) he opposed the centralisation and Germanisation.

Vukotinović's literary work began in Danica ilirska, where he published in 1835 the first Illyrian patriotic poem Pesma Horvatov vu Glogovi leto 1813, known by verse Nek se hrusti šaka mala. He published collections Pjesme i pripovjetke ("Poems and short stories", 1838), Ruže i trnje ("Roses and thorns", 1842), Pesme ("Poems", 1847) and Trnule (1867), and a collection of historical short stories, Pošasnost ugarsko-hrvatska (1844).

In 1842, together with Stanko Vraz and Dragutin Rakovac, he founded the literary magazine Kolo and, in 1859–1861, established and edited the almanac Leptir. With Dragutin Rakovac, he edited in 1842 the first Croatian anthology of patriotic poetry Pesmarica. Sbirka 1. Pesmice domorodne. He also authored theatre plays (Golub, 1832).

As a naturalist, Vukotinović was engaged in botany, exploring the Croatian flora and co-authoring with Josip Schlosser a number of important floristic works: Syllabus florae Croaticae ("An overview of the Croatian flora", 1843), Bilinar (1873) and the seminal work Flora Croatica ("Croatian flora", 1869). His herbarium is now a part of the collection Herbarium Croaticum in the Department of Botany, Faculty of Science in Zagreb. He also studied petrography, mineralogy and geology, and was one of the founders of the National Museum in Zagreb. He served as a secretary of the Economic Society (1854) and edited Gospodarski list (1855–1857). In 1867, he was appointed as a full member of the Yugoslav Academy of Sciences and Arts.

He died on 17 March 1893 in Zagreb and was buried at Mirogoj Cemetery.

== Works ==
- Schlosser Klekovski, Josip Klasancije; Vukotinović, Ljudevit Farkaš (1854). "Naturhistorische Wanderungen durch einige Gegenden Nord-Croatiens im Jahr 1853" [Natural History Hikes Through Some Parts of North Croatia in the Year 1853]. Österreichisches Botanische Wochenblatt (in German). 4 (17): 137–141. ISSN 1029-0729. JSTOR 43793026.
- Schlosser Klekovski, Josip Klasancije; Vukotinović, Ljudevit Farkaš (March 1857). Syllabus florae Croaticae. Additis descriptionibus specierum novarum [Syllabus of Croatian Flora, with Added Descriptions of New Species] (in Latin).
- Schlosser Klekovski, Josip Klasancije; Vukotinović, Ljudevit Farkaš (March 1869). Flora Croatica, exhibens stirpes phanerogamas et vasculares cryptogamas, quae in Croatia, Slavonia et Dalmatia sponte crescunt, nec non illas quae frequentissime coluntur [Flora Croatica, showing the phanerogamous and vascular cryptogamous species which grow naturally in Croatia, Slavonia and Dalmatia, as well as those which are most frequently cultivated] (in Latin).
- Schlosser Klekovski, Josip Klasancije; Vukotinović, Ljudevit Farkaš (1876). Bilinar: uputa u sabiranju i označavanju bilinah u Hrvatskoj, Slavoniji i Dalmaciji [Plant Guide: Instructions on Collecting and Annotating Plants in Croatia, Slavonia, and Dalmatia] (in Serbo-Croatian). Zagreb: L. Hartman i družba.
- Vukotinović, Ljudevit Farkaš (1877). "Nove biline i razjasnjenja o nekih dovjbenih: Addenda ad Floram Croaticam" [New Plants and Elucidations of Certain Ambiguous Plants: Additions to Flora Croatica]. Rad Jugoslavenske akademije znanosti i umjetnosti (in Serbo-Croatian). 39: 193–216.
