= Antun Nalis =

Croatian actor (1911–2000)

Antun Nalis (9 February 1911 – 14 February 2000), a.k.a. Tonči Nalis, was a Croatian actor.

Antun Nalis was born in Zadar, which was part of Austria-Hungary at the time. After World War I Zadar became part of Italy, which later helped Nalis to play in Italian movies and portray Italian characters.

Nalis began to build his film career after World War Two. His first screen appearance in 1949 film Zastava almost became his last. In the film he played an Ustasha colonel and in the break between shooting he went to the store to buy groceries, forgetting to change his clothes. He was arrested by UDBA and it took some time to convince authorities that he was an actor playing Ustasha rather than actual Ustasha hiding in the woods after the war.

Not discouraged by the incident, Nalis continued with his career, appearing in many classics of 1950s and 1960s Croatian and Yugoslav cinema. After playing villains in his early career, in this period Nalis established himself in comedic roles in both film and television. Gradually he built a reputation as one of the most recognisable and dependable character actors.

== Selected filmography ==
- Zastava (1949) - Ustaski satnik Vuksan
- The Blue 9 (1950) - Fabris
- U oluji (1952) - Vincenco
- Sinji galeb (1953) - Lorenco
- Stone Horizons (1953) - Martin
- Koncert (1954) - Natporucnik
- Blodveien (1955) - Svare
- The Jubilee of Mr Ikel (1955) - Teodor Ikl
- Mala Jole (1955)
- Zle pare (1956) - Konte
- H-8... (1958) - Ivica - Thief
- Hvězda jede na jih (1959) - Festival director
- Agi Murad il diavolo bianco (1959) - Melders, Murad's Lieutenant
- Campo Mamula (1959) - Talijanski zapovjednik Manipolo
- Vetar je stao pred zoru (1959) - Nemacki major
- Austerlitz (1960) - (uncredited)
- Garibaldi (1961)
- Martin in the Clouds (1961) - Carmine
- The Emperor's New Clothes (1961) - Kapetan straze
- Adventurer at the Door (1961) - Oficir
- Happiness Comes at Nine o'Clock (1961) - Gradjanin
- Velika turneja (1961) - Vodja dramske grupe Tonci
- Karolina Rijecka (1961) - Andra
- Srescemo se veceras (1962) - Gradjanin
- Zvizduk u osam (1962) - Filmski reditelj
- Treasure of Silver Lake (1962) - Bruns (uncredited)
- Double Circle (1963) - Kuhar
- Apache Gold (1963) - Barman Hicks
- Sluzbeni polozaj (1964) - Cinovnik u administraciji
- Last of the Renegades (1964) - Sgt. Wagner (uncredited)
- Nikoletina Bursać (1964) - Zarobljeni domobran
- Prometheus of the Island (1964) - Elektricar
- Treasure of the Aztecs (1965)
- The Pyramid of the Sun God (1965) - Cortejo
- Čovik od svita (1965) - Krcmar Grgo
- The Oil Prince (1965) - Jenkins (uncredited)
- Denovi na iskusenie (1965) - Oficer predavnik (uncredited)
- Eagles Fly Early (1966) - Nemacki oficir (uncredited)
- Looking Into the Eyes of the Sun (1966) - Vemic
- The Seventh Continent (1966) - Otac djece
- Glineni golub (1966) - Zeljeznicar Martic
- Die Nibelungen (1966, part 1) - Person (uncredited)
- Kaya (1967) - Gradski uglednik Tonko
- Fast ein Held (1967)
- Goli čovik (1968) - Toni
- When You Hear the Bells (1969) - Charles / Topnik
- Sunday (1969) - Imbecil
- Togetherness (1970) - Papalopolous
- Družba Pere Kvržice (1970) - Velecasni
- The Way to Paradise (1970) - Lijecnik, kirurg
- Prvi splitski odred (1972) - Policajac
- Deveto cudo na istoku (1972) - Talijan sa povezom preko oka
- Crveni udar (1974) - Ustasa
- Train in the Snow (1976) - Urednik novina
- Occupation in 26 Pictures (1978) - Paolo
- Covjek koga treba ubiti (1979)
- High Voltage (1981) - Konobar
- Pad Italije (1981)
- The Secret of an Old Attic (1984) - Tonci
- The Red and the Black (1985) - Profasista
- My Uncle's Legacy (1988) - Drug na Martinovom sprovodu
- Captain America (1990) - Old Repairman
- Prica iz Hrvatske (1991) - (final film role)
