= Dragutin Rakovac =

Croatian writer

Dragutin Rakovac (or Rakovec) (1 November 1813 – 22 November 1854) was a Croatian writer, translator and journalist.

He was born in Vugrovec. He received a degree in philosophy and law in 1831 in Zagreb. From 1831 he was employed at the Tabula Banalis and in a law clerk office. He was an associate of Ljudevit Gaj and an editor of the Novine horvatske (1835–1842). Together with Ljudevit Vukotinović and Stanko Vraz he founded and edited magazine Kolo in 1842. Since 1841 he served as a secretary of the Economic Society and an editor of several of its publications. He also edited Koledar za puk (1847–1850). He founded the magazine Gospodarki list and edited it from 1841 to 1850. He became the first curator of the National Museum in 1846.

In his youth Rakovac wrote, translated and adapted works in the Kajkavian dialect (Theodor Körner and others). His adaptation of a monodrama by August von Kotzebue Stari mladoženja i košarice was published in 1832. The only preserved original dramatic work of his is a dramatic poem Duh ("Spirit", 1832), while the play Veronika od Desenic, started in 1831, is today only known by its title. His first work in the Štokavian dialect was published in 1835 in the first issue of Danica ilirska, where he continued to publish Illyrian patriotic and later love poetry (Sila ljubavi, 1837 and others), foreshadowing romantic Neopetrarchism. According to a Slovak template he wrote a poem Duh slavjanski ("The Slavic Spirit"), from which three stanzas became the anthem of the Socialist Federal Republic of Yugoslavia (Hey, Slavs). Together with Ljudevit Vukotinović he published the first Croatian anthology of patriotic poetry: Pjesmarica: pjesme domorodne in 1842. In his political essay Mali katekizam za velike ljude ("A small catechism for great people", 1842) he defends the dignity of Croatian and the right to defend the Croatian national identity against the Hungarian encroachments. His memoirs Dnevnik (1922) were published posthumously, and represent an important historical account of the Illyrian movement.

He died in Zagreb.
