= Antun Nemčić =

Croatian writer

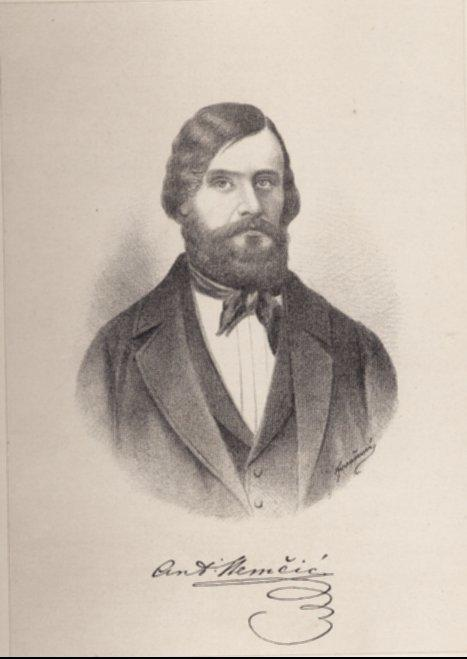
A painting of Antun Nemčić with a signature.

Antun Nemčić Gostovinski (pronounced [ǎntuːn nêːmt͡ʃit͡ɕ]; 14 January 1813 – 5 September 1849) was a Croatian writer.

He was born in Edde, Hungary. He graduated law in Zagreb. As a trainee lawyer, notary and a district judge he served in Križevci, Osekovo, Novi Marof and Ludbreg. In 1848 he was elected as a representative in the Croatian Parliament.

Nemčić's literary opus is described as one of the few that transcended the pragmatic and revivalist function of the Illyrian movement. His first poems were published in Danica ilirska (1839), and until his death he had made a sizeable poetic opus, mostly covering romantic love motifs. These were posthumously assembled in the book Pjesme ("Poems", 1851). His Putositnice (1845) is a canonical work of Croatian romanticism. It is a travelogue modeled on Laurence Sterne's Sentimental Journey. The rest of Nemčić's opus is fragmentary and incomplete: the second part of Putositnice (Neven, 1852), five fragments of Udes ljudski (Neven, 1854 ) – one of the first attempts at the modern novel in Croatian literature, written also in antimimetic tradition of Laurence Sterne – and a drama Kvas bez kruha ili Tko će biti veliki sudac? (Neven, 1854), a successful farcical comedy which ironizes Croatian political life and electoral machinations. He has written a number of feuilletons and newspaper articles, and a critical biography Život Tome Blažeka (in the book Političke pjesme Tome Blažeka, 1848). Nemčić served as the model for the character of Antun Gostinski, the narrator of the novel Ispovijest by Blaž Lorković (Dragoljub, 1868).

He died in Križevci.
