= Happiness Comes at Nine o'Clock =

- Croatian: Sreća dolazi u 9
- Directed by: Nikola Tanhofer
- Written by: Vitomil Zupan
- Based on: The Galoshes of Fortune by Hans Christian Andersen
- Starring: Irena Prosen; Antun Vrdoljak; Mila Dimitrijević; Drago Krča; Mia Oremović; Antun Nalis; Viktor Bek; Pero Kvrgić; Tatjana Beljakova
- Cinematography: Branko Ivatović
- Edited by: Radojka Ivančević
- Music by: Dragutin Savin
- Production company: Jadran Film
- Release date: 17 July 1961
- Running time: 101 min.

Happiness Comes at Nine o'Clock (Sreća dolazi u 9) is a Croatian fantasy film directed by Nikola Tanhofer. It was released in 1961. It was preserved and, in 2003, restored by the Croatian State Archives. It is based on the fairy tale The Galoshes of Fortune by Hans Christian Andersen, and was the first feature-length fantasy film in Yugoslav cinematography, and the last role of Mila Dimitrijević. It was released in SFR Yugoslavia, Italy, Bulgaria and Egypt.

== Plot summary ==
Two women, Happiness and Worry, arrive to a small town. Happiness leaves a magic coat at the local restaurant, stating that anyone who wears it will have all their wishes fulfilled. The magic coat goes on to fulfill the wishes of a shy violin teacher; an old night watchman; Miki, a student; and a young blonde woman – all to little satisfaction.
