= The Siege (1956 film) =

1956 film by Branko Marjanović

- Directed by: Branko Marjanovic
- Written by: Zvonimir Berkovic; Slavko Kolar; Nikola Tanhofer
- Starring: Goranka Vrus; Boris Buzancic; Jurica Dijakovic
- Cinematography: Nikola Tanhofer
- Edited by: Radojka Tanhofer
- Release date: 30 June 1956
- Running time: 1h 55m
- Country: Yugoslavia
- Language: Serbo-Croatian

The Siege (Opsada) is a Croatian film directed by Branko Marjanović. It was released in 1956.
