= Sunday (1969 film) =

Sunday (Serbo-Croatian: Nedjelja) is the debut feature film of Croatian film director Lordan Zafranović, premiering in 1969. Zafranović made a film while he was still a student. The plot follows a Sunday in life of a young man who wanders along streets of Split along with three friends, entering a range of bizarre situations, culminating in hijacking of a bus and standoff with police.

Sunday is based on Zafranović's eponymous short film from 1961. Zafranović wrote the screenplay with Živko Jeličić after an idea by Ranko Kursar. The cinematographer was Predrag "Pega" Popović, while the main role was assigned to Goran Marković, later a successful director, both Zafranović's friends from the Prague Film School. The main woman's role was given to Nada Abrus, a high-school student from Split. The film was recorded in 35 days during 1968. The director described the theme as a "clash between natures of a young revolting individual and the civilization as we know it". Sunday has a certain elements of youthful, modernist extravagance.

== Cast ==
- Goran Marković as Ivan
- Dragomir Čumić as Puso
- Martin Crvelin as Saša
- Gordan Pičuljan as Mladen
- Nada Abrus as Marija, Ivan's girlfriend
- Relja Bašić
- Antun Nalis
- Mia Oremović
- Olga Pivac
