= Ciguli Miguli =

- Directed by: Branko Marjanović
- Screenplay by: Joža Horvat
- Starring: Ljubomir Didić; August Cilić; Viktor Bek; Martin Matošević; Zvonko Tkalec; Joža Šeb; Ljubo Dijan; Milivoj Arhanić; Olga Klarić; Boris Buzančić; Đokica Milaković
- Cinematography: Nikola Tanhofer
- Edited by: Radojka Ivančević
- Music by: Ivo Tijardović
- Production company: Jadran Film
- Release dates: 1952 (private screening); 30 April 1977 (public release)
- Running time: 104 minutes
- Country: Yugoslavia
- Language: Croatian

Ciguli Miguli is a 1952 Yugoslav political satire film directed by Branko Marjanović and written by Joža Horvat. It was meant to be the first satirical film of the post-World War II Yugoslav cinema, but its sharp criticism of bureaucracy was politically condemned by the authorities and the film was banned as "anti-socialist".

== Plot ==
Ivan Ivanović, a party functionary, arrives in a provincial town as a temporary replacement for a cultural official. The newcomer is fanatically eager to reform the town's cultural life in accordance with socialist ideals. He abolishes all five music societies and orders a monument of the town's most revered native, late composer Ciguli Miguli, removed from the main square. Ivanović's actions, however, meet stiff resistance from the townspeople, especially the youth.

== Background and production ==
Prior to Ciguli Miguli, director Branko Marjanović and writer Joža Horvat had collaborated on Zastava (1949), a socialist realist war film that won several awards. This time, however, Horvat wanted something different, hoping that a satire of Soviet-type bureaucracy would mesh with the wave of liberalization of cultural life in Yugoslavia set in motion by Tito's breakup with Stalin in 1948. Moreover, Horvat believed that this new climate would be the beginning of substantial democratic changes in the country, initiated from within the Communist Party of Yugoslavia itself.

Marjanović took over Ciguli Miguli only after his proposal for Nikola Tesla, a biography of the famous engineer and inventor, had been rejected by Jadran Film. As a non-party intellectual, he was not an ideal choice for directing a politically risky film, but it was believed that Joža Horvat's impeccable reputation and his good standing with the authorities would be sufficient.

Ciguli Miguli was a significantly more complex project than Zastava, but the shooting - which began in August 1951 - was finished in six months. That was considered normal for standards of Yugoslav cinema of the era, in contrast with chaotic and protracted shooting of Zastava that lasted for fifteen months.

Although Marjanović initially chose veteran filmmaker Oktavijan Miletić as a cinematographer, the two soon parted ways due to disagreements. Miletić was replaced with Nikola Tanhofer, cinematographer of Zastava, then still only 25 years old. Another conflict arose between Marjanović and assistant director Mate Relja, who left near the end of the shooting, later describing Marjanović as "confused", as well as "unpleasant" and "impossible to work with" in his letter to Jadran Film's board.

== Reception and aftermath ==
After a private screening for cultural and political leaders in Zagreb, a decision was made not to permit public showing of Ciguli Miguli. A brief but intense media harangue against the film followed in the Vjesnik daily newspaper, spearheaded by Frane Barbieri, Vjesnik's editor-in-chief, and Milutin Baltić, a high-ranking Communist Party official.

Characterization of main antagonist Ivan Ivanović - whose Russian-sounding name seems to be more than just a coincidence - was not seen as a satire on Stalinism, or as a criticism of excesses of Yugoslav socialism, but rather as an all-out attack on socialist authorities. The detractors were unhappy with the oafish portrayal of Ivanović, as opposed to depiction of petty bourgeois music societies' leaders as likable slackers. One of the scenes that were particularly problematic was the one in which a music society leader agrees to have his shop nationalized, only to find it teeming with bureaucracy shortly afterwards. Lines such as "Ak’ je i za socijalizam, to je previše" ("Even if it's for socialism, it's too much") did not help either. Some scenes that Horvat added to the scenario during the filming in order to forestall trouble only incensed the critics further. The film reportedly angered Josip Broz Tito himself, which meant that its fate was sealed, irrespective of sympathies many high-ranking party members had for Joža Horvat.

Being responsible for the scenario, Horvat bore the brunt of public criticism, to which he was not allowed to respond. Finding that he had had too much, he left the country for France, and returned to screenwriting only in the 1960s.

Consequences for Marjanović's career, on the other hand, were less serious because, unlike Horvat, he was seen more as an executor. In 1953 and 1954 he proposed changes to the film in order to lift the ban, but Jadran Film was not interested. His next feature film, The Siege (1956), was not well-received, and turned out to be his last. After that, Marjanović turned to nature documentaries, a genre that brought him more accolades than his feature films.

Ciguli Miguli was banned for 25 years, until it was quietly issued a permit for public screening on 30 April 1977. Its broadcast on national television in 1989 generated brief media interest. The film was digitally restored in 2011.

== See also ==
- List of banned films
