= Stone Horizons =

Stone Horizons may refer to:

- Stone Horizons (1956 film), an Argentine film
- Stone Horizons (1953 film), a Croatian film
