= Doktor Mladen =

- Directed by: Midhat Mutapdžić
- Starring: Ljuba Tadić; Pavle Vuisić
- Cinematography: Miroljub Dikosavljevic
- Release date: 1975
- Running time: 1h 42min
- Country: Yugoslavia
- Language: Serbo-Croatian

Doktor Mladen is a 1975 Yugoslav biographical film directed by Midhat Mutapdžić, on the life of Mladen Stojanović during the Second World War.

== Cast ==
- Ljuba Tadić - Dr. Mladen Stojanovic
- Pavle Vuisić Radovan Tadic
- Ljubiša Samardžić - Stanisa
- Husein Cokic - Djuka
- Zvonimir Črnko - Omer
- Rudi Alvadj - Jure
- Vlasta Knezovic - Danica
- Ana Karić - Doktorova supruga
- Jelena Zigon - Andja
- Zaim Muzaferija - Petar
- Dušan Janićijević - Joza
- Rastislav Jovic - Enver
- Igor Galo - Racan
- Vanja Drach - SS Major
- Uglješa Kojadinović - Ustaski satnik
- Zijah Sokolović - Huska
