= Only People =

Only People may refer to:

- Only People (song), 1973 John Lennon song
- Only People (film), 1957 Yugoslav film
