= Illyrian movement =

19th-century cultural and political movement

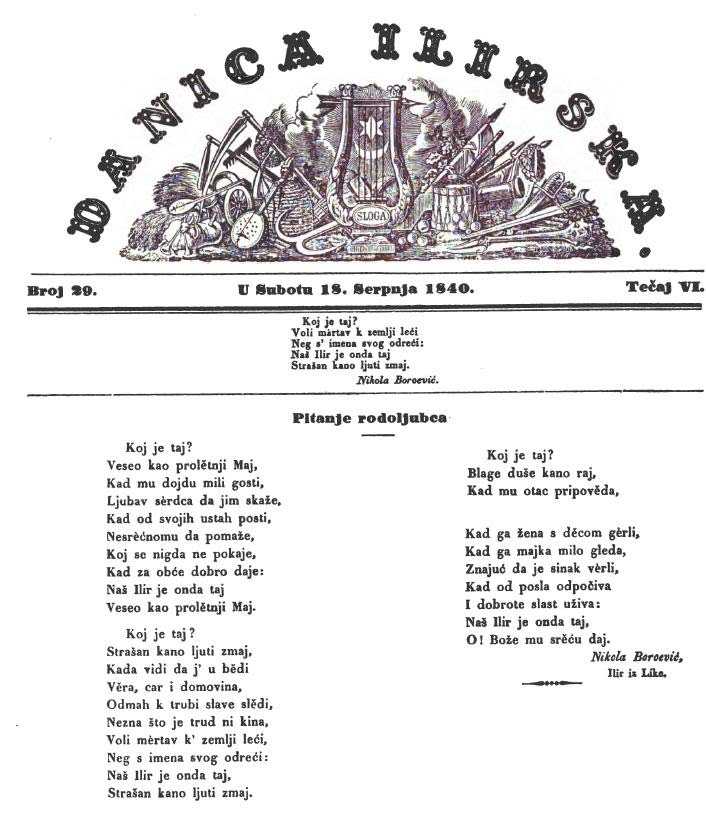
Danica Ilirska, Ljudevit Gaj's newspaper.

The Illyrian movement (Croatian: Ilirski pokret; Slovene: Ilirsko gibanje) was a pan-South-Slavic cultural and political campaign with roots in the early modern period, and revived by a group of young Croatian intellectuals during the first half of the 19th century, around the years of 1835 to 1863. (Note: There is some disagreement regarding the official dates from 1835 to 1870.) This movement aimed to create a Croatian national establishment in Austria-Hungary through linguistic and ethnic unity, and through it lay the foundation for cultural and linguistic unification of all South Slavs under the revived umbrella term Illyrian.

Aspects of the movement pertaining to the development of Croatian culture are considered in Croatian historiography to be part of the Croatian national revival (Croatian: Hrvatski narodni preporod).

== Name ==
Views of Josip Kušević inspired the nascent Croatian national revival movement. His view that the South Slavs are indigenous population, tracing their origin to the Illyrians inhabiting the Balkan Peninsula in ancient times, led him to hypothesise that there is a common South Slavic language which he referred to as the idioma Croatico-Slavico-Illyricum (Croatian-Slavic-Illyrian language). In the 19th century, the name Illyrian was chosen by the members of the movement as a reference to the theory according to which South Slavs descend from ancient Illyrians. Fearing provincial particularism, reformers believed that the Illyrian name would make it easier to implement literary unity. The name Illyrian (Slavic) had already been used in reference to the South Slavic dialects spoken there at the time.

== Historical context ==
In 19th-century Europe, liberalism and nationalism were ideologies which came to the forefront of political culture. In Central Europe, where the Habsburg Empire had long asserted control over a variety of ethnic and cultural groups, nationalism appeared in a standard format. The beginning of the 19th century "was the period when the smaller, mostly Slavic nationalities of the empire – Czechs, Slovaks, Slovenes, Croats, and Serbs – remembered their historical traditions, revived their native languages as literary languages, reappropriated their traditions and folklore, in short reasserted their existence as nations." This revival of national heritage encompasses the Illyrian Movement in Croatia.

In 1813, the bishop of Zagreb, Maksimilijan Vrhovac, issued a plea for the collection of "national treasures" (Poziv na sve duhovne pastire svoje biskupije), thereby heralding the national revival movement. Influenced by his father Josip, who was the first mayor in French-controlled Karlovac and one of its first Freemasons, Juraj Šporer attempted to publish the first newspaper in the 'home-born' (Croatian: domorodnom) language. His project was aborted because of the complete lack of interest for a newspaper published in his native language.

Just as Croatia felt nationalistic stirrings at this time, so did its larger neighbors, Hungary and Austria. Croats were uneasy with rising Hungarian nationalism, which pursued reduction of the Croatian autonomy and increased Magyarization. In order to preserve their autonomy, Croats pursued a deepening of their culture and a revival of their heritage. Members of the Illyrian movement were heavily influenced by the 1700 publication Croatia Rediviva.

In the beginning of the 1830s, a group of young Croatian writers initially led by Ljudevit Gaj gathered in Zagreb and established a movement for national renewal and unity of all South Slavs within the Habsburg Monarchy. The city of Zagreb had become an important center of political, economic, and cultural activity, so it was the center of the movement. Count Janko Drašković published his Dissertation in 1832, a pamphlet that later came to be considered the political, economic, social and cultural program of the movement, as it promoted the native language as official, more autonomy from central government, and better education and enlightenment for the common people. Gaj served as the leader of the movement as a whole in the beginning for eight or nine years, at which point the leadership changed hands.

The greatest issue for Illyrians was the establishment of a standard language as a counter-weight to Hungarian, and the promotion of Croatian written literature and official culture. Illyrians envisioned a single literary language and orthography to serve as a means of cultural and national unification, paving the way for a general national revival.

== Illyrian language conceptions ==
In 1830, Ljudevit Gaj published Kratka osnova horvatsko-slavenskoga pravopisanja ("Brief basics of the Croatian-Slavic orthography"), which was the first linguistic work to be published during the movement. In it he presented his proposal for a reform of the Illyrian alphabet, which included the introduction of diacritics. This was motivated by the alphabets of other Slavic peoples who wrote in the Latin script (Czechs, Slovaks and Poles), as well as by earlier domestic practices such as the alphabet used by Pavao Ritter Vitezović. After Vitezović's letters l̃ and ñ, Gaj introduced tilde as a diacritic in the letters c̃, z̃, s̃, l̃, ñ, d̃ and g̃. However, for tactical reasons that notation has not been thoroughly applied. Even though the alphabetic reform was originally intended for the speakers of the Kajkavian (Croatian: Kajkavski) dialect, in his work Gaj put forward the idea of a common alphabet for all South Slavs using Latin script, which would lay the foundation for the common literary language.

In 1835, Gaj started publishing Novine Horvatzke ("Croatian newspapers") and Danicza Horvatzka, Slavonzka i Dalmatinzka in Kajkavian and using old Kajkavian alphabet. But since the very beginning Gaj's magazines also contained pieces from older Shtokavian dialect (Croatian: Štokavski) literature, namely Ragusan, to pave the way for the introduction of a common literary language on Shtokavian basis. The tenth issue of his Danicza is already using the new alphabet and Shtokavian in some of the published pieces, and since the 29th issue the new alphabet is dominant.

On 5 December 1835, Gaj published a Proclamation announcing the publication of Ilirske narodne novine ("Illyrian folk newspapers") and Danica ilirska, abandoning old alphabet and introducing the Shtokavian dialect. The terminological shift from "Croatian" to "Illyrian" more accurately reflected the ideological goals of the Illyrian movement, as well as the usage of the Shtokavian dialect which was at that period the most widely spoken dialect. Illyrians' goal was to make that language more accessible to the Kajkavian and Chakavian (Croatian: Čakavski) speakers. In that spirit, Gaj's 1835 Proclamation states:

There can only be one true literary language in Illyria... It is not found in a single place, or a single country, but in the whole of Illyria... Our grammar and our dictionary is the whole of Illyria. In that huge garden there are beautiful flowers everywhere: let us gather everything of the best in one wreath, which will never wither.

— Ljudevit Gaj, Proclamation, 1835

Beside the fundamental Illyirian ethnological notion of South Slavs as the descendants of ancient Illyrians, awareness of national distinctiveness was also present. Thus Gaj writes in 1839 in Danica: "Our intention is not to abolish individual names, but unify them under a general name, because each of the individual names carries its own individual history, which gathered together comprise a more general history of the Illyrian nation." In an attempt to overcome regional fragmentation and achieve unification, followers of the movement promote Illyrian name, making concessions in language and orthography. Drawing on existing literary traditions in three different dialects, and in an attempt to ease the linguistic and cultural unification, Illyrians advocate the usage of some archaic forms in grammar, and some Kajkavian and Chakavian words. Such changes were hoped to be acceptable to everyone using the Illyrian language.

=== Orthography and alphabet ===
Acting on the intention of Illyrians to create a common literary language and orthography for all South Slavs, Gaj in his 1835 article Pravopisz abandoned his original alphabet. Of the many letters with diacritics he initially proposed, only č, ž, š and ě were retained, and due to printing difficulties carons were used instead of tildes. The digraphs lj́, nj́, dj́ and dž were used instead of the former l̃, ñ, d̃ and g̃, as these digraphs were already known from the Slavonian alphabet, which was the most widespread alphabet before the Illyrian movement. What today is written as ć was written as both ć and tj́, while the letter j́ was soon to be replaced by j. This alphabet system introduced by Gaj was used until the late 19th century, when Đuro Daničić finally introduced the letter đ for dj, and generalized the usage of ć, yielding the modern Croatian alphabet.

With respect to orthographic issues, the Illyrians endorsed the so-called etymological (also called morphonological) orthography, spelling words according to their morphology and etymology. This was opposed to the contemporaneous phonological orthography "write as you speak, and speak as you write" advocated by Vuk Stefanović Karadžić and his followers. The Illyrians justified their spellings as being more comprehensible and easier to learn, while also better reflecting the orthographic practices of other Slavic peoples. They pitted Karadžić's adage against their own: "speak for the ears, write for the eyes".

=== Language characteristics ===
Gaj's main associates and followers were Vjekoslav Babukić and Antun Mažuranić. In their linguistic manuals (Babukić's 1836 Osnova slovnice slavjanske narěčja ilirskoga, "The basics of Slavic grammar of the Illyrian dialect"; extended edition as 1854 Slovnica ilirska, "Illyrian grammar"; Mažuranić's 1839 Temelji ilirskoga i latinskoga jezika, "The foundation of the Illyrian and Latin language") they were led by the ideological goals of the Illyrian movement, building upon the language supported by the movement's adherents, and which was later advocated by the so-called Zagreb Philological School.

Two of the most important grammatical traits advocated by Illyrians were old inflectional endings for the dative, locative and instrumental plural of nouns, as well as the ending -ah in genitive plural of nouns, which earned them a derisive nickname "Ahavians" (ahavci). For example:

- genitive plural: momakah, kraljah, selah, poljah, ženah, kostih
- dative plural: momkom, kraljem, selom, poljem, ženam, kostim
- locative plural: momcih, kraljih, selih, poljih, ženah, kostih
- instrumental plural: momci, kralji, seli, polji, ženami, kostmi

A different set of issues were involved in writing reflexes of the Proto-Slavic yat sound, as well as the syllabic /r/. All of the possible yat reflexes (i, e, je or ije, depending on the dialect) were covered by the letter ě, which was derisively called "horned e" (rogato e). Initially it was suggested that everyone reads ě according to their local pronunciation, though it would be preferable to publicly pronounce it as [je] or [ije] For syllabic /r/ they were convinced that the pronunciation differs from non-syllabic /r/, so they introduced spelling of the accompanying vowel as well (àr, èr: e.g. kàrv', dèrvo).

=== Impact ===
As opposed to the alphabet which is in a slightly modified form used to this day for Croatian, grammatical and orthographic practices advocated by Illyrians provoked resentment and opposition by some contemporaries as well as by future generations of linguists. Illyrians were criticized from different points of view, and their practices were attacked more often individually rather than as a system, and had a different lifespan, eventually suffering the same fate: disappearance from the language. The so-called etymological orthography survived the longest, until the turn of the century.

== Cultural development ==
The most influential writers within the movement were Ivan Mažuranić and Petar Preradović. Mažuranić contributed his epic The Death of Smail-aga Čengić during this time, and Preradović published love lyrics.

Other notable literary contributions were made by Antun Mihanović (notably "Horvatska domovina"), Stanko Vraz (satiric lyrics), Ljudevit Vukotinović (romantic lyrics), Dimitrija Demeter (prose, notably Grobničko polje, and drama), Ivan Kukuljević Sakcinski (prose), Antun Nemčić (prose and itineraries). There was also the first notable itinerary Pogled u Bosnu by Matija Mažuranić.

After the government allowed the publishing of newspapers in Croatian in 1834, the Gaj issued the first Croatian newspaper, Novine hrvatsko-slavonsko-dalmatinske, in 1835, establishing Croatian journalism. The paper was edited by Ljudevit Gaj and it also had a literary magazine Danica attached, both of which printed in Gaj's "National print" (Narodna tiskara). Each issue of Danica began with the motto "people without a nation/Is like a body without bones."

In 1836, the papers were renamed to use the Illyrian name (Ilirske novine, Danica ilirska). In 1838, Janko Drašković helped found a reading room in Zagreb which served as a meeting place for the first "Illyrians".

In another cultural success, in 1846 the composer Vatroslav Lisinski wrote the first opera in Croatian, Ljubav i zloba ("Love and Malice").

The Illyrian movement, while concentrating on Croatian lands, was quite nationally inclusive, as it included many non-Croats. For example, Petar Preradović was an ethnic Serb, as was Josip Runjanin, Stanko Vraz was an ethnic Slovene, and Dimitrija Demetar was either ethnic Greek or Aromanian.

== Struggles ==
In 1840, the Illyrian movement suffered an internal setback when Stanko Vraz, Dragutin Rakovac and Ljudevit Vukotinović split off from the movement due to creative differences in poetry. In 1842 they started publishing their own literary newspaper named Kolo.

Political disputes in the Sabor were so fierce they caused unrest in the streets of Zagreb. On 29 July 1845, violent clashes erupted at St. Marko's Square, the casualties of which were to become known as the "July victims". Notwithstanding these events, Hungarian officials were unable to crush the movement.

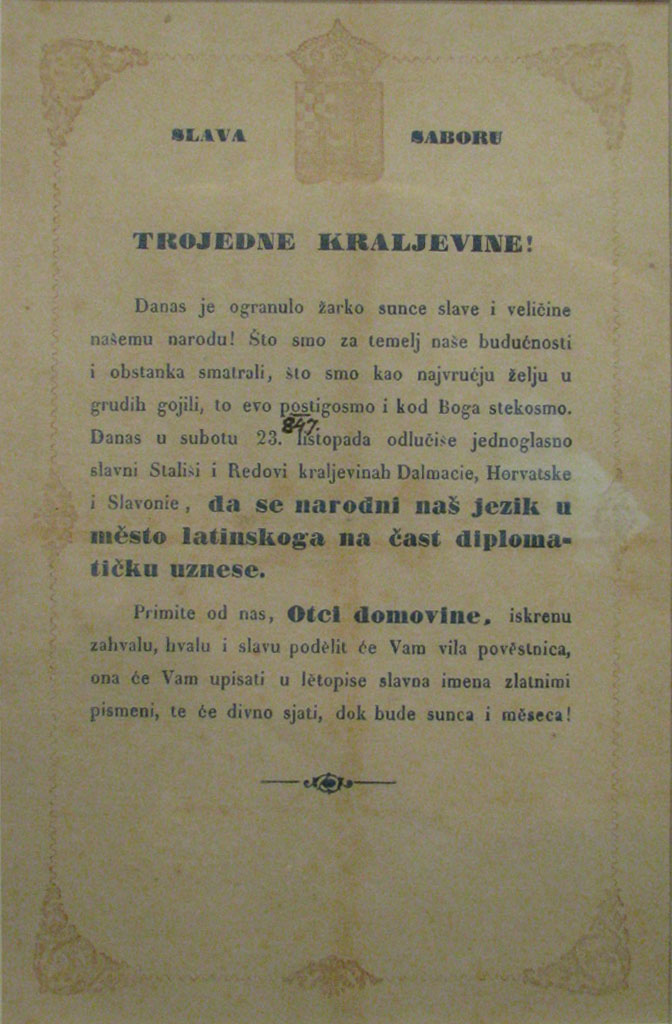
Leaflet praising the Sabor of the Triune Kingdom for elevating the "people's language" to the "honor of diplomacy".

Speaking in front of the Sabor on 23 October 1847, Ivan Kukuljević Sakcinski advocated Croatian as the official language instead of Latin and the deputies subsequently voted unanimously in favor of said proposition.

The movement practically ceased to exist due to the Revolutions of 1848. In 1849, Emperor Francis Joseph imposed a new constitution, all political dissent was censored, and Danica went out of print.

== Aftermath ==
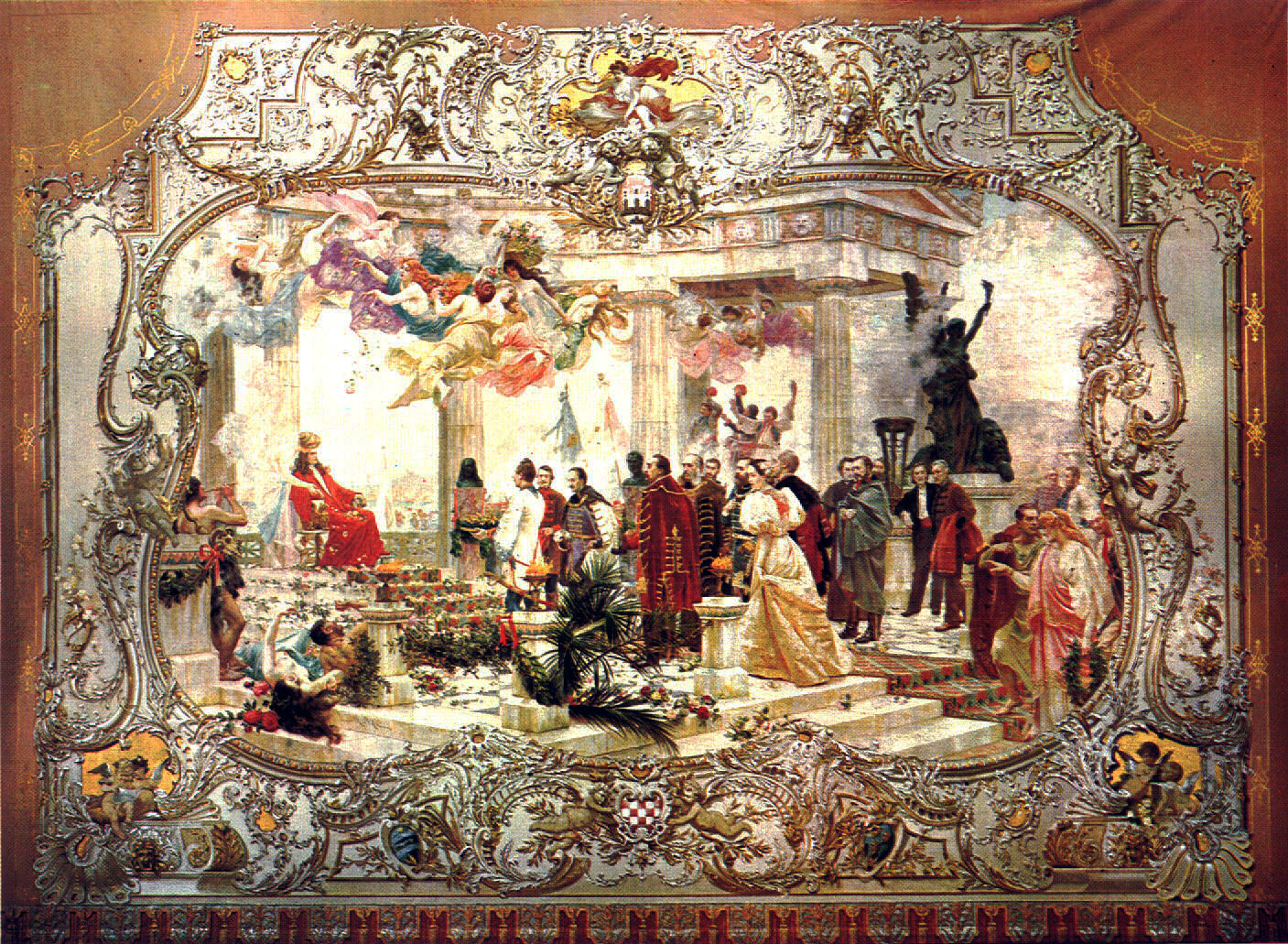
Vlaho Bukovac: Hrvatski narodni preporod, Curtain at the Croatian National Theatre in Zagreb

The movement's plea for unity among the Slavs, particularly South Slavs, also found supporters among prominent Serbs of the time, most notably Vuk Stefanović Karadžić, the reformer of Serbian language. Ljudevit Gaj had, in fact, appealed to Serbia (along with Dalmatia and Russia) for moral and financial support given their ethnic and cultural connections.

In 1850, a small group of Croatian and Serbian representatives signed the Vienna Literary Agreement which in effect proclaimed the southern Shtokavian dialect to be the standard, common language of Serbs and Croats, with the Serbian Cyrillic and Croatian Latin alphabets as equal scripts. The agreement was the basis of standardizing the Serbo-Croatian language.

== Assessment and criticism ==
The Illyrian movement was the first and most prominent pan-Slavic movement in Croatian history.

The Illyrian movement was successful in its goals for culture. "Where there was no precedent for nineteenth-century concepts like Czechoslovak or Illyrian nationhood these projects failed. Nationalism took hold insofar as it built on existing realities, historical, linguistic or social." The period of the Illyrian movement is today referred to as the "Croatian national revival".

The movement formed the basis for eventual common Serbo-Croatian language, and it fostered support in Croatia for its ultimate goal of creating an "Illyrian state", but the movement itself had failed to achieve that goal. Increasing Croatian nationalism shifted towards pan-Slavic ideals because the Croatian identity superseded the "Illyrian" hopes.
