= I Have Two Mothers and Two Fathers =

- Directed by: Krešo Golik
- Written by: Krešo Golik; Mirjam Tušek (Novel)
- Starring: Davor Radolfi; Mia Oremović; Relja Bašić; Fabijan Šovagović; Vera Čukić; Tomica Žganec; Igor Galo
- Cinematography: Ivica Rajković
- Edited by: Katja Majer
- Music by: Tomica Simović
- Production company: Jadran Film, Zagreb
- Release date: July 19, 1968 (Yugoslavia)
- Running time: 93 minutes
- Country: SFR Yugoslavia
- Language: Croatian

I Have Two Mothers and Two Fathers (Croatian: Imam dvije mame i dva tate) is a 1968 Yugoslav/Croatian comedy drama film directed by Krešo Golik.

The film won the Golden Arena for Best Actress (Mia Oremović) and Golden Arena for Best Cinematography (Ivica Rajković) at the 1968 Pula Film Festival, the Yugoslav national film awards.

In 1999, a poll of Croatian film critics found it to be one of the best Croatian films ever made.
