= Indian Summer (1970 film) =

Indian Summer (Bablje ljeto) is a 1970 Croatian film directed by Nikola Tanhofer.
