= Fedor Hanžeković =

- Born: 9 January 1913; Bijeljina, Austria-Hungary
- Died: 18 August 1997 (aged 84); Zagreb, Croatia
- Occupation: Director
- Years active: 1956–1993

Fedor Hanžeković (9 January 1913 – 18 August 1997) was a Croatian film director.

== Biography ==
Hanžeković studied art history and English language at the University of Zagreb Faculty of Humanities and Social Sciences before starting his filmmaking career in the years following the end of World War II. Hanžeković made several political documentaries in the 1940s, most notable of which is the 1947 film Stepinac at the People's Court (Stepinac pred narodnim sudom), depicting the postwar trial of Alojzije Stepinac.

In the 1950s Hanžeković made a series of screen adaptations of novels penned by Yugoslav authors. He directed a total of three feature-length films, most notably the highly popular 1957 comedy film Master of His Own Body (Svoga tela gospodar), based on the short story by Slavko Kolar and its theatre adaptation directed by Branko Gavella, and filmed in the Kajkavian dialect.

He is also notable as one of the founders and longtime editors of the influential Yugoslav film magazine Filmska kritika.

He died on 18 August 1997 in Zagreb where he is buried in Mirogoj Cemetery (Groblje Mirogoj).

== Filmography ==
- Bakonja fra Brne (1951)
- Stojan Mutikaša (1954)
- Master of His Own Body (Svoga tela gospodar, 1957)
