= Ljuba Tadić =

Serbian actor

- Љуба Тадић
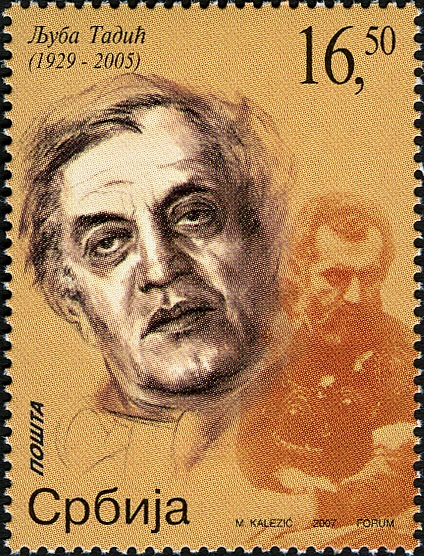
- Ljuba Tadić on a 2007 Serbian stamp
- Born: Ljubomir Tadić; 31 May 1929; Uroševac, Kingdom of Serbs, Croats and Slovenes (Uroševac, Kosovo i Metohija)
- Died: 28 October 2005 (aged 76); Belgrade, Serbia and Montenegro
- Occupation: Actor
- Years active: 1953–2005
- Awards: Big Golden Arena – Big Golden Arena for Best Actor; 1964 Marš na Drinu – Major Kursula Big Golden Arena – Big Golden Arena for Best Actor; 1968 Uka i Bjeshkëve të nemura – Uka; Big Golden Arena – Big Golden Arena for Best Actor; 1974 Strah – Franc Big Golden Arena – Big Golden Arena for Best Actor; 1975 Doktor Mladen – Dr. Mladen Stojanovic

Ljubomir "Ljuba" Tadić (Serbian Cyrillic: Љубомир Љуба Тадић; 31 May 1929 – 28 October 2005) was a Yugoslav actor who enjoyed a reputation as one of the greatest names in the history of former Yugoslav cinema.

== Biography ==
He made his screen debut in 1953, but his first truly memorable role was in the 1957 film Nije bilo uzalud. In this film, like in many others, he played the villain, but he turned out to be the most memorable character. Later he built on this reputation and continued to play important historical and larger-than-life characters.

Tadić also made history by uttering an obscenity in one of the final scenes of 1964 World War I epic Marš na Drinu, which was the first such instance in the history of former Yugoslav cinema.

== Selected filmography ==
Film
Year	Title	Role	Notes
1996	Impure Blood		
1989	Battle of Kosovo		
1982	Cyclops		
1980	Special Treatment		
1978	Schwarz und weiß wie Tage und Nächte	Stefan Koruga	
1978	Ward Six		
1975	Doktor Mladen		
1973	The Battle of Sutjeska	Sava Kovačević	
1972	The Master and Margaret		
1968	Comandamenti per un gangster	Northon	
1968	U raskoraku		
1966	The Dream		
1964	March on the Drina	Major Kursula	
1962	The Steppe		
1961	Nebeski odred		
1957	It Was Not in Vain		
1955	The Girl and the Oak	Josip	

TV
Year	Title	Role	Notes
1987	Vuk Karadžić		

== Notes ==
=== References ===
- Curti, Roberto (2013). Italian Crime Filmography, 1968-1980. McFarland. ISBN 978-0786469765.
