= Krešo Golik =

Croatian film and television director and screenwriter (1922–1996)

- Krešo Golik on set
- Born: Krešimir Golik; 20 May 1922; Fužine, Kingdom of Serbs, Croats and Slovenes
- Died: 20 September 1996 (aged 74); Zagreb, Croatia
- Occupations: Film director, screenwriter
- Years active: 1948–1990

Krešimir "Krešo" Golik (20 May 1922 – 20 September 1996) was a Croatian film and television director and screenwriter. In a creative career spanning five decades between the late 1940s and late 1980s, Golik directed a number of critically acclaimed feature films, short subjects and television series.

Working almost exclusively at Zagreb-based production companies Jadran Film, Zagreb Film and Croatia Film, Golik is regarded as one of the most important directors in Croatian cinema and his 1970 comedy One Song a Day Takes Mischief Away is widely regarded as the greatest Croatian film ever made.

According to Croatian film scholar Ivo Škrabalo, Golik was "the only Croatian film-maker who managed to retain his integrity in all the periods of the post-war Croatian cinema, from its beginnings in the service of the propaganda of the victorious communist system to the last years of its existence".

== Life and career ==
Golik was born in Fužine, where he completed his primary education. He went to the Gymnasium and the schools of graphic design in Senj and Zagreb. He worked as a sports journalist on Radio Zagreb and a director of newsreels in Jadran Film. In 1947, Golik started his professional film career. His first feature film was Plavi 9 (Blue 9, 1950), a mixture of the Soviet-style industrial epic, romantic comedy, and football film, and is famous for its football sequences. After its release, it quickly became the biggest hit of the then-young Yugoslavian cinema.

During the 50s, Golik also directed Djevojka i hrast (The Young Girl and the Oak, 1955). During the 1960s, it was revealed that Golik worked as a journalist during the fascist Ustashe regime when he was a teenager. Golik was thus banned from directing for almost a decade but continued working as an assistant. His comeback was marked by the anthological documentary Od 3 do 22 (From 3 to 22, 1966).

His melodramatic comedy films I Have Two Mothers and Two Fathers (1968) and One Song a Day Takes Mischief Away (1970) were the pinnacle of his career. The first explores the transformation of traditional family structures and societal class stratification through a coming-of-age story, and the second is a humorous diary of a Zagreb family between the two world wars based on Vjekoslav Majer’s short story "Iz dnevnika malog Perice" (1935). In 2017, the Croatian National Theatre in Zagreb staged a play with the same name inspired by the movie. Critics and audiences regularly include those two films (especially the latter) among the top 10 Croatian films of all time.

Golik was also very successful on television. He made TV films and dramas. His greatest TV success was another comedy: Gruntovčani, a series about the life of villagers in the Croatian region of Podravina. It was shot in the northwestern Kajkavian dialect. The success of the series encouraged the renaissance of the use of dialects in contemporary Croatian culture.

From 1979 until his retirement in 1989, he taught film direction at the Zagreb Academy of Dramatic Art. He was awarded the lifetime achievement award Vladimir Nazor Award. Krešo Golik died in Zagreb in September 1996.

As he was involved in both art films and popular films and television, he has often been compared to Billy Wilder and Lubitsch.

In 2003/2004, the film section of the Elementary School Ivanka Trohar in Fužine initiated the Days of Krešo Golik, which has grown into an annually recurring program supported by the Municipality Fužine of film evenings, exhibitions, seminars, and symposiums dedicated to Krešo Golik’s film work and legacy.

== Selected filmography ==
- Plavi 9 (1950; director and writer)
- The Girl and the Oak (Djevojka i hrast, 1955; director)
- Kala (1958; director)
- Martin in the Clouds (Martin u oblacima, 1961; writer)
- Superfluous (Prekobrojna, 1962; writer)
- Nikoletina Bursać (1964; writer)
- I Have Two Mothers and Two Fathers (Imam dvije mame i dva tate, 1968; director and writer)
- One Song a Day Takes Mischief Away (Tko pjeva zlo ne misli, 1970; director and writer)
- To Live on Love (Živjeti od ljubavi, 1973; director and writer)
- Razmeđa (1973; director)
- Pucanj (1977; director)
- Violet (Ljubica, 1978; director)
- The Orchid Villa (Vila Orhideja, 1988; director and writer)
