= Branko Bauer =

Croatian film director

- Born: 18 February 1921; Dubrovnik, Kingdom of Serbs, Croats and Slovenes
- Died: 11 April 2002 (aged 81); Zagreb, Republic of Croatia
- Occupations: Director, screenwriter
- Years active: 1950–1982
- Awards: Vladimir Nazor Award for Life Achievement in Film (1980)

Branko Bauer (18 February 1921 – 11 April 2002) was a Croatian film director. He is considered to be the leading figure of classical narrative cinema in Croatian and Yugoslav cinema of the 1950s.

== Early life ==
Bauer became interested in cinema as a school boy. During World War Two he attended local cinemas in Zagreb, which were very popular during the Nazi occupation. His father Čedomir Bauer and he hid their Jewish tenant Ljerka Freiberger from the Croatian Ustashi police in 1942. As a result of these actions, Yad Vashem honored both of them as Righteous among the Nations in 1992.

In 1949, Branko began working in the Zagreb-based Jadran Film studio as a documentary filmmaker. His feature debut was the 1953 children's adventure film The Blue Seagull (Sinji galeb) which distinguished his work from then-native Yugoslav productions through vivid visual style and natural acting.

== Selected works ==
=== Don't Look Back, My Son ===
Bauer became one of the most respected directors in Yugoslavia after his third film, the 1956 war thriller Don't Look Back, My Son (Ne okreći se sine; released as Don't Turn Around, Son in the US). The film tells a story about a World War II resistance fighter who escapes a train en route to the Jasenovac concentration camp and returns to Zagreb in an attempt to find his son and join the partisans in the Croatian hinterland. However, he realizes that his son is in an Ustaša boarding school and has been brainwashed. The hero manages to escape the city with his son but throughout their journey, he is forced to lie to his son about their actions. The film was loosely based on Carol Reed's thriller Odd Man Out, and its last scene - which inspired the title of the film - was inspired by Disney's film Bambi.

=== Three Girls Named Anna ===
Bauer's next film was the 1957 feature Only People (Samo ljudi), a melodrama influenced by films of Douglas Sirk. The film was a critical flop, mainly because melodrama was not considered a serious genre in 1950s communist Yugoslavia. After that film, Bauer worked for a Macedonian production company and made Three Girls Named Anna (Tri Ane; 1959), a neorealism-influenced film sometimes compared to Umberto D. by Vittorio de Sica. Three Girls Named Anna tells a story of an old man who lives alone believing that his daughter was killed in World War II as a child. Suddenly the man receives information that she could have had survived and is now probably living as an adult in a foster family. Bauer's gritty, authentic portrayal of post-war poverty and the lower classes of society was not welcomed by the establishment, and the film was never shown in cinemas, but it is today often considered Bauer's "forgotten masterpiece" and his best film.

Bauer's next two films were more commercially successful - the 1961 comedy Martin in the Clouds (Martin u oblacima); and the 1962 film Superfluous (Prekobrojna, 1962), which introduced Milena Dravić as a future Yugoslav superstar.

=== Face to Face ===
Probably the best known of Bauer's films is the 1963 feature Face to Face (Licem u lice), a film which is considered to be the first Yugoslav political film. It tells a story about a rebel worker who challenges a manager during a communist party meeting in a huge construction company. Although it was initially seen as controversial due to its political content, the film eventually received support by communist officials, which was understood among filmmakers as a green light for more overt depictions of socially controversial topics. Serbian director Živojin Pavlović said that Face to Face had been "the most important film shot in Yugoslavia by that time".

== Late career ==
During the 1960s, Yugoslav films shifted to modernism, and Bauer couldn't accommodate to an auteur cinema. In the 1960s he made two unsuccessful modernist films, and was subsequently unable to get funding for his new cinema projects. During the 1970s, he directed the TV series Salaš u malom ritu (1976), a war drama set in Vojvodina, one of the most memorable works of Yugoslav television.

== Critical reception ==
During the 1950s and 1960s, Bauer was regarded as a master of Yugoslav cinema and commanded respect from the government and his colleagues alike. Although his films never questioned the regime, the dominant set of values in these films was described as "old-fashioned" and "bourgeois": instead of the usual glorification of youth and revolution his films often praised the decent, old, middle-class type of families. Bauer's typical heroes made the right moral choices not inspired by ideology but driven by a sense of honor instead. Contemporary Croatian filmmaker Hrvoje Hribar once wrote that "Bauer had a sense for the blind spot of [communist] ideology, so he put his films in a place where it was as close as possible, yet least influential." However, by the late 1960s and 1970s, with the rise of modernist cinema, Bauer was pushed to the sidelines.

In the late 1970s his works were rediscovered by young critics as a kind of a Yugoslav version of old Hollywood masters. Slovenian film historian Stojan Pelko wrote in the British Film Institute's Encyclopedia of Russian and Eastern European Cinema that "Bauer was for Yugoslav critics what Hawks and Ford were for French New Wave critics". A substantial critical reevaluation of Bauer's work took place since the mid-1980s. In a late 1990s critics' poll of all-time greatest Croatian film directors, Bauer took second place, behind Krešo Golik.

== Filmography (as director) ==
- The Blue Seagull (Sinji galeb, 1953)
- Millions on the Island (Milijuni na otoku, 1955)
- Don't Look Back, My Son (Ne okreći se sine, 1956)
- Only People (Samo ljudi, 1957)
- Three Girls Named Anna (Tri Ane, 1959)
- Martin in the Clouds (Martin u oblacima, 1961)
- Superfluous (Prekobrojna, 1962)
- Face to Face (Licem u lice, 1963)
- Nikoletina Bursać (1964)
- Doći i ostati (To Arrive and to Stay, 1965)
- Fourth Companion (Četvrti suputnik, 1967)
- Salaš u Malom Ritu (A Farm in Mali Rit, 1975)
- Boško Buha (1978)

== Sources ==
- Hribar, Hrvoje (June 2002). "Šesta rola, Kraj" (PDF). Hrvatski filmski ljetopis (in Croatian) (30). Zagreb: Croatian Film Association, Croatian State Archives and Croatian Society of Film Critics: 3–7.
- Kragić, Bruno (May 2007). "Izazovi "Amerike" u hrvatskom filmu i pisanju o filmu – esej o postupnoj realizaciji naslovne metafore" [The Challenges of "America" in the Croatian Film and Writings on Film – An Essay on Gradual Realisation of the Main Metaphor] (PDF). Dani Hvarskoga kazališta (in Croatian). 33 (1): 527–536.
- Pavičić, Jurica (June 2003). "Igrani filmovi Fadila Hadžića" [Fadil Hadžić's feature films] (PDF). Hrvatski filmski ljetopis (in Croatian). 9 (34). Zagreb: Croatian Film Association, Croatian State Archives and Croatian Society of Film Critics: 3–38.
- Pavičić, Jurica (March 2004). "Žanr i ideologija u filmu Ne okreći se sine" (PDF). Hrvatski filmski ljetopis (in Croatian) (37). Zagreb: Croatian Film Association, Croatian State Archives and Croatian Society of Film Critics: 63–72.
- Škrabalo, Ivo (1998). 101 godina hrvatskog filma, 1896-1997 (in Croatian). Zagreb: NZ Globus.
