= Bruno Bjelinski =

Croatian composer

- Born: Bruno Weiss; 1 November 1909
- Died: 3 September 1992 (aged 82)
- Era: 20th century
- Works: http://quercus.mic.hr/quercus/person/205

Bruno Bjelinski (born Bruno Weiss; 1 November 1909 – 3 September 1992) was one of the most influential Croatian composers in the 20th century. He was extremely prolific as a composer. His unique musical style was built upon the music of Poulenc, Hindemith, Ravel and Milhaud. He developed his own and recognizable musical language with the elements of neoclassicism. Bjelinski composed six operas, three ballets, 15 symphonies, 2 cello concertos, a cantata, piano music, songs, chamber music, and concertos for piano, violin, viola, bassoon, flute, and piano duo. He also composed music for the Croatian football movie Plavi 9.

== Biography ==
Bjelinski was born in Trieste into a Jewish family. His mother died very early in his life so his father brought him to Zagreb where he was nurtured by his grandmother. In his youth, he played violin and piano. Later he changed his surname from Weiss to Bjelinski (derivation of the word bijeli, meaning 'white' in Croatian). He doctored in law at the University of Zagreb and later studied music at the Zagreb Academy of Music under Blagoje Bersa and Franjo Dugan. Bjelinski started composing in the 1930s. By the beginning of World War II, he had finished his 2 sonatas for violin and piano, 3 piano suites and a toccata. During World War II he was sent to a concentration camp, but in 1943, with the help of a friend, he escaped and joined the Partisans on the island of Korčula. At the end of the war he lived alternately on island Vis and in the Italian city of Bari. He taught at the Academy from 1945 to 1977. In the late 1950s, he married young and perspective pianist Ljerka Pleslić (b. 1938), with whom he had two sons, Dean and Alan Bjelinski. The younger son, Alan, later became a composer and conductor. Bjelinski died on 3 September 1992 on the island Silba where he was buried.

Bjelinski's music is described as being direct and optimistic, his fresh style lending itself to both serious music and music for children. Bjelinski composed six operas, three ballets, 15 symphonies, 2 cello concertos, a cantata, piano music, songs, chamber music, and concertos for piano, violin, viola, bassoon, flute, and piano duo. He also composed music for the Croatian football film Plavi 9.

== Legacy ==
Bjelinski produced a body of work characterized by specific melodic, harmonic, and rhythmic elements. While not associated with the "national course," his work incorporates elements of folk music, Balkan rhythms, and South American dances influenced by his time in Brazil, as well as features of jazz. His musical style includes Mediterranean lyricism and dramatic sound structures. His compositions contain elements of Baroque music, such as kinetic motion and specific structures, alongside neo-Classical influences. His work often contains elements of humor or irony. Bjelinski composed in various genres of classical music.

== Awards ==
For his music, he received several awards: Mlado pokoljenje award (1965), Vladimir Nazor Award (1976) for life achievement and Josip Slavenski award (1986). In the year of 1988 he became a member of Croatian Academy of Sciences and Arts.

== Works (selection) ==
- Concerto for flute and strings, 1955
- Ljetna simfonija (Summer Symphony), Symphony No. 1, 1955
- Serenade for trumpet, piano, strings and percussion, 1957
- Pčelica Maja (Maya the Bee), fairy tale opera after Waldemar Bonsels, 1963
- Sinfonia jubilans, Symphony No. 4, 1965
- Peter Pan, ballet for children, 1966
- Sinfonietta concertante, for piano and orchestra, 1967
- Musica Tonalis for oboe, bassoon and strings, 1968
- Heraklo (Herkules) comic opera, 1971
- Močvara (The Marsh), opera, 1972
- Zvona (The Bells), opera, 1975
- Orfej XX. stoljeca (Orpheus in the Twentieth Century), opera, 1981
- Slavuj (The Nightingale), opera after Hans Christian Andersen, 1984
- Concertino for horn and strings, 19??
- Drei biblische Legenden for trombone and piano, 19??

== Bibliography ==
- Knežević, Snješka; Laslo, Aleksander (2011). Židovski Zagreb. Zagreb: AGM, Židovska općina Zagreb. ISBN 978-953-174-393-8.
- Goldstein, Ivo (2005). Židovi u Zagrebu 1918 - 1941. Zagreb: Novi Liber. ISBN 953-6045-23-0.
- Kraus, Ognjen (1998). Dva stoljeća povijesti i kulture Židova u Zagrebu i Hrvatskoj. Zagreb: Židovska općina Zagreb. ISBN 953-96836-2-9.
- Romano, Jaša (1980). Jevreji Jugoslavije 1941-1945: žrtve genocida i učesnici narodnooslobodilačkog rata. Beograd: Jevrejski Istorijski Muzej, Saveza jevrejskih opština Jugoslavije.
