= Svanuće =

Svanuće is a 1964 Croatian film directed by Nikola Tanhofer, starring Miha Baloh, Senka Veletanlić and Ilija Džuvalekovski.
