= Đurđa Ivezić =

Croatian actress (1936–2020)

- Born: 17 October 1936; Zagreb, Kingdom of Yugoslavia
- Died: 11 December 2020 (aged 84); Zagreb, Croatia
- Occupation: Actress
- Years active: 1958–2007

Đurđa Ivezić (17 October 1936 – 11 December 2020) was a Croatian film, television and stage actress.

== Biography ==
Ivezić voiced Betty Rubble in the Croatian synchronization(dubbing) of The Flintstones and Smurfette in The Smurfs.

She died from COVID-19 during the COVID-19 pandemic in Croatia.

== Filmography ==
=== Television roles ===
- "Smogovci" as Bor (voice) (1996)
- "Smogovci" as Cook (1983)
- "Vrijeme ratno i poratno" (1975)
- "Ljubav na bračni način" (1970)

=== Movie roles ===
- "Čarobnjakov šešir" as Re and Bobo (1990)
- "Čudesna šuma" as Re and mushroom picker (1986)
- "Motel mjesečina" (1976)
- "Reakcionari" (1975)
- "Teret dokaza" (1972)
- "Stanica tel" (1970)
- "Brak je uvijek riskantna stvar" (1970)
- "Meteor" (1969)
- "Sedma zapovjed božja - kradi malo manje!" (1967)
- "Nastavak slijedi" (1966)
- "Druga strana medalje" (1965)
- "Sve same varalice" (1964)
- "Poštar zvoni dva puta" (1960)
- "H-8" as Alma Novak (1958)
