= The Jubilee of Mr Ikel =

- Directed by: Vatroslav Mimica
- Written by: Vatroslav Mimica; Antun Nalis
- Starring: Antun Nalis
- Cinematography: Oktavijan Miletić
- Edited by: Blaženka Jenčik; Maja Marković
- Music by: Milo Cipra
- Production company: Jadran Film
- Release date: 18 May 1955
- Running time: 77 minutes
- Country: Yugoslavia
- Language: Serbo-Croatian

The Jubilee of Mr Ikel (Croatian: Jubilej gospodina Ikla) is a 1955 Yugoslav feature film directed by Vatroslav Mimica. While Mimica had several writing credits, this was his directorial debut.

== Cast ==
- Antun Nalis as Teodor Ikel, a man who awakes in a grave to discover those who knew him celebrating his alleged death. Nalis was also a co-writer along with Mimica for the movie.
- Borivoj Sembera as Dr. Mihajlo Miki Laufer
- Lila Anders as Estera Ikel
- Mila Mosinger as Irma Bazul
- Zvonko Strmac as Florijan Krkac
- Nela Eržišnik as Flora Krkac
- Divor Zilic as Veselko Krkac
