= Josip Schlosser =

Josip Klasancije Schlosser pl. Klekovski (1801–1882) was a Croatian medical doctor and botanist.

Together with Ljudevit Farkaš Vukotinović, he was an author of Flora croatica (1869), the main work for the knowledge of plants in Croatia. He was the most prominent 19th century botanist and explorer of Risnjak mountain, and wrote numerous publications about Risnjak's flora.

== Works ==
- Schlosser Klekovski, Josip Klasancije; Vukotinović, Ljudevit Farkaš (March 1857). Syllabus florae Croaticae. Additis descriptionibus specierum novarum [Syllabus of Croatian Flora, with Added Descriptions of New Species] (in Latin).
- Schlosser Klekovski, Josip Klasancije; Vukotinović, Ljudevit Farkaš (1854). "Naturhistorische Wanderungen durch einige Gegenden Nord-Croatiens im Jahr 1853" [Natural History Hikes Through Some Parts of North Croatia in the Year 1853]. Österreichisches Botanische Wochenblatt (in German). 4 (17): 137–141. ISSN 1029-0729. JSTOR 43793026.
- Schlosser Klekovski, Josip Klasancije; Vukotinović, Ljudevit Farkaš (March 1869). Flora Croatica, exhibens stirpes phanerogamas et vasculares cryptogamas, quae in Croatia, Slavonia et Dalmatia sponte crescunt, nec non illas quae frequentissime coluntur [Flora Croatica, showing the phanerogamous and vascular cryptogamous species which grow naturally in Croatia, Slavonia and Dalmatia, as well as those which are most frequently cultivated] (in Latin).
- Schlosser Klekovski, Josip Klasancije; Vukotinović, Ljudevit Farkaš (1876). Bilinar: uputa u sabiranju i označavanju bilinah u Hrvatskoj, Slavoniji i Dalmaciji [Plant Guide: Instructions on Collecting and Annotating Plants in Croatia, Slavonia, and Dalmatia] (in Croatian). Zagreb: L. Hartman i družba.

== Sources ==
- "Schlosser, Josip Kalasancije - Klekovski". Croatian Encyclopedia.
