= Millions on the Island =

1955 film by Branko Bauer

Millions on the Island (Milioni na otoku) is a 1955 Croatian film directed by Branko Bauer.
