= Double Circle (film) =

- Croatian: Dvostruki obruč
- Directed by: Nikola Tanhofer
- Produced by: Jadran Film
- Music by: Dragutin Savin
- Release date: 1963
- Running time: 87 minutes
- Country: Yugoslavia
- Language: Croatian

Double Circle (Dvostruki obruč) is a 1964 Yugoslav film directed by Nikola Tanhofer.

== Plot ==
Set in Yugoslavia during World War II, underground fighters fight the Third Reich and their own neighbors, who have become collaborators.
