= Bakonja fra Brne =

1951 film by Fedor Hanžeković

Bakonja fra Brne is a 1951 Croatian film directed by Fedor Hanžeković. It is based on Simo Matavulj's 1892 novel of the same name.
