= The Girl and the Oak =

- Directed by: Krešo Golik
- Written by: Mirko Božić
- Starring: Tamara Marković; Ljuba Tadić
- Cinematography: Frano Vodopivec
- Edited by: Radojka Ivančević
- Music by: Branimir Sakač
- Production company: Jadran Film
- Release date: February 12, 1955
- Running time: 82 minutes
- Country: Yugoslavia
- Language: Serbo-Croatian

The Girl and the Oak (Serbo-Croatian: Djevojka i hrast) is a 1955 Yugoslav film directed by Krešo Golik.

== Cast ==
- Tamara Miletić as Smilja (as Tamara Markovic)
- Ljuba Tadić as Josip (as Ljubivoje Tadic)
- Miodrag Popović-Deba as Bojan (as Miodrag Popovic)
- Andrej Kurent as Ivan
- Viktor Bek as Marko
- Josip Petričić as Roko
- Stojan 'Stole' Arandjelović as Petar, Ivanov brother (as Stojan Arandjelovic)
- Violeta Prosevska as Smilja kao djevojcica
- Ivka Berković as Ivanova majka
- Mia Sasso as Smiljina mati
- Luka Aparać as Ilija - Ivanov brat
- Josip Batistić as Svecenik
- Drago Mitrović as Pavle
- Mile Gatara as Seljak
