= Stanko Vraz =

Slovenian poet (1810–1851)

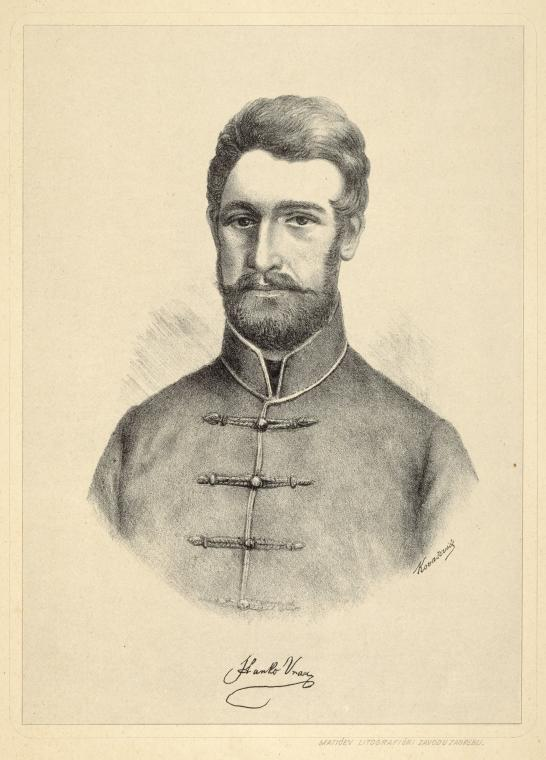
Stanko Vraz

Stanko Vraz (baptized Jakob Fraß; 30 June 1810 – 20 May 1851) was a Slovenian-Croatian poet. He Slavicized his name to Stanko Vraz in 1836.

== Biography ==
Born in the village of Cerovec in Lower Styria, Austrian Empire (today in Slovenia), Vraz was one of the most important figures of the Illyrian Movement in the Kingdom of Croatia and Slavonia. He completed elementary school in Ljutomer and gymnasium in Maribor after which he studied philosophy in Graz. During his education and career he reached fluency in German, French, Spanish and multiple Slavic languages. He was the first Croatian to earn his living as a professional writer. He wrote poems and travelogues and collected folk poems. He also translated foreign literature into Croatian.

While in Samobor, he met Julijana "Ljubica" Cantilly, the niece of his friend and colleague, Ljudevit Gaj. She served as his muse, and he wrote and dedicated many poems and works to her. In this period Vraz became a strong advocate for the Illyrian Movement.

Stanko Vraz died in Zagreb in 1851.

== Works ==
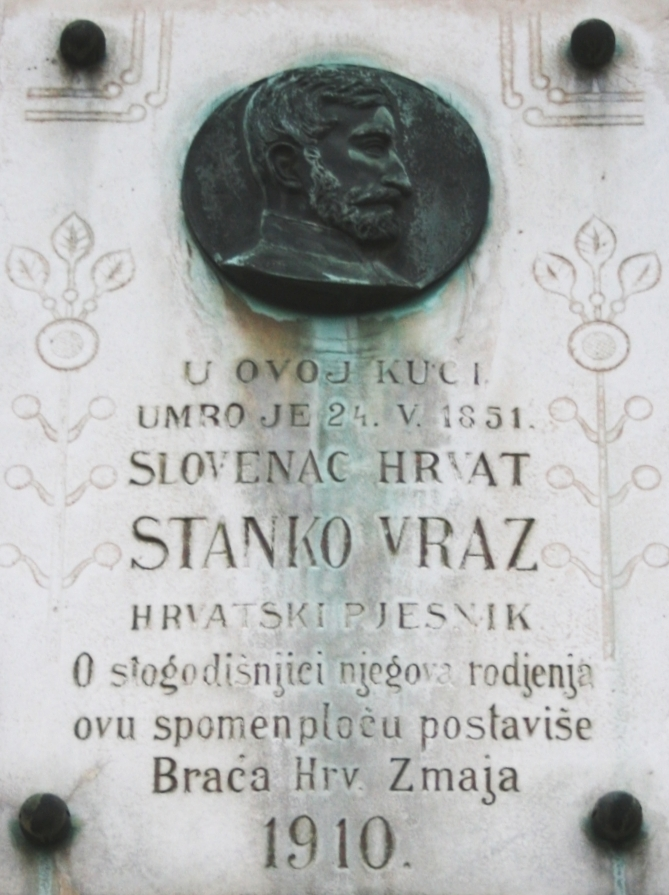
Memorial to Stanko Vraz in Zagreb

After he moved to Zagreb Vraz worked as a secretary of the Matica ilirska. In 1842, he and two of his other contributors founded Kolo, one of Croatia's first literary magazines. The magazine, as well as his works, were influenced by national romanticism.

Regarding the Slovene language, Vraz's most notable work is the work Narodne pesmi ilirske, koje se pevaju po Štajerskoj, Kranjskoj, Koruškoj i zapadnoj strani Ugarske (Illyrian Folk Songs Sung in Styria, Carniola, Carinthia and the Western Part of Hungary). It contains folk songs and art songs in Slovene, accompanied by comments in Croatian. These songs are the first Slovene texts in Gaj's Latin Alphabet. This orthography was already used at the time by Croats and spread among Slovenes a few years later. Vraz created numerous poems in Slovene but for the most part they have never been published.

He also translated works of Lord Byron and Adam Mickiewicz.

== See also ==
- Illyrian Movement
