= The Blue 9 =

- Plavi 9
- Directed by: Krešo Golik assistant directors: Ante Babaja; Vladimir Krstulović
- Written by: Krešo Golik; Hrvoje Macanović; Geno Senečić
- Starring: Antun Nalis; Irena Kolesar
- Cinematography: Nikola Tanhofer; Slavko Zalar
- Edited by: Radojka Tanhofer
- Music by: Bruno Bjelinski
- Distributed by: Jadran Film
- Release date: 1950
- Running time: 95 minutes
- Country: Yugoslavia
- Language: Croatian

The Blue 9 (Plavi 9) is a 1950 Croatian football comedy film. The film was directed by Krešo Golik.

The film mixes Soviet-style industrial epics, romantic comedy and football film. It is known for superbly directed football sequences. After release it quickly became the biggest hit of then-young Yugoslav cinema.

This film is first Croatian movie with sport as the main topic. The Blue 9 is also first Croatian comedy film from sound era.

Movie was filmed on the locations in Croatia (Split, Rijeka and Zagreb) and in Serbia (Belgrade).

== Cast ==
- Irena Kolesar as Nena
- Jugoslav Nalis as Zdravko
- Antun Nalis as Fabris
- Ljubomir Didic as Pjero 'Situacija'
- Tjesivoj Cinotti as Kibic
