= It Was Not in Vain =

1957 film

- Directed by: Nikola Tanhofer
- Written by: Nikola Tanhofer; Pero Budak
- Starring: Boris Buzančić
- Cinematography: Slavko Zalar
- Edited by: Radojka Tanhofer
- Production company: Jadran Film
- Release date: 2 February 1957 (Yugoslavia)
- Running time: 93 minutes
- Country: Yugoslavia
- Language: Serbo-Croatian

It Was Not in Vain (Croatian: Nije bilo uzalud) is a 1957 Yugoslavian drama film directed by Nikola Tanhofer. It was entered into the 7th Berlin International Film Festival.

== Cast ==
- Boris Buzančić
- Mira Nikolić
- Mia Oremović
- Zlata Perlić
- Zvonimir Rogoz
- Vjera Simić
- Ivan Šubić
- Ljuba Tadić (as Ljubo Tadić)
- Antun Vrdoljak
- Mladen Šerment
