= Ljudevit Gaj =

Croatian linguist and politician (1809–1872)

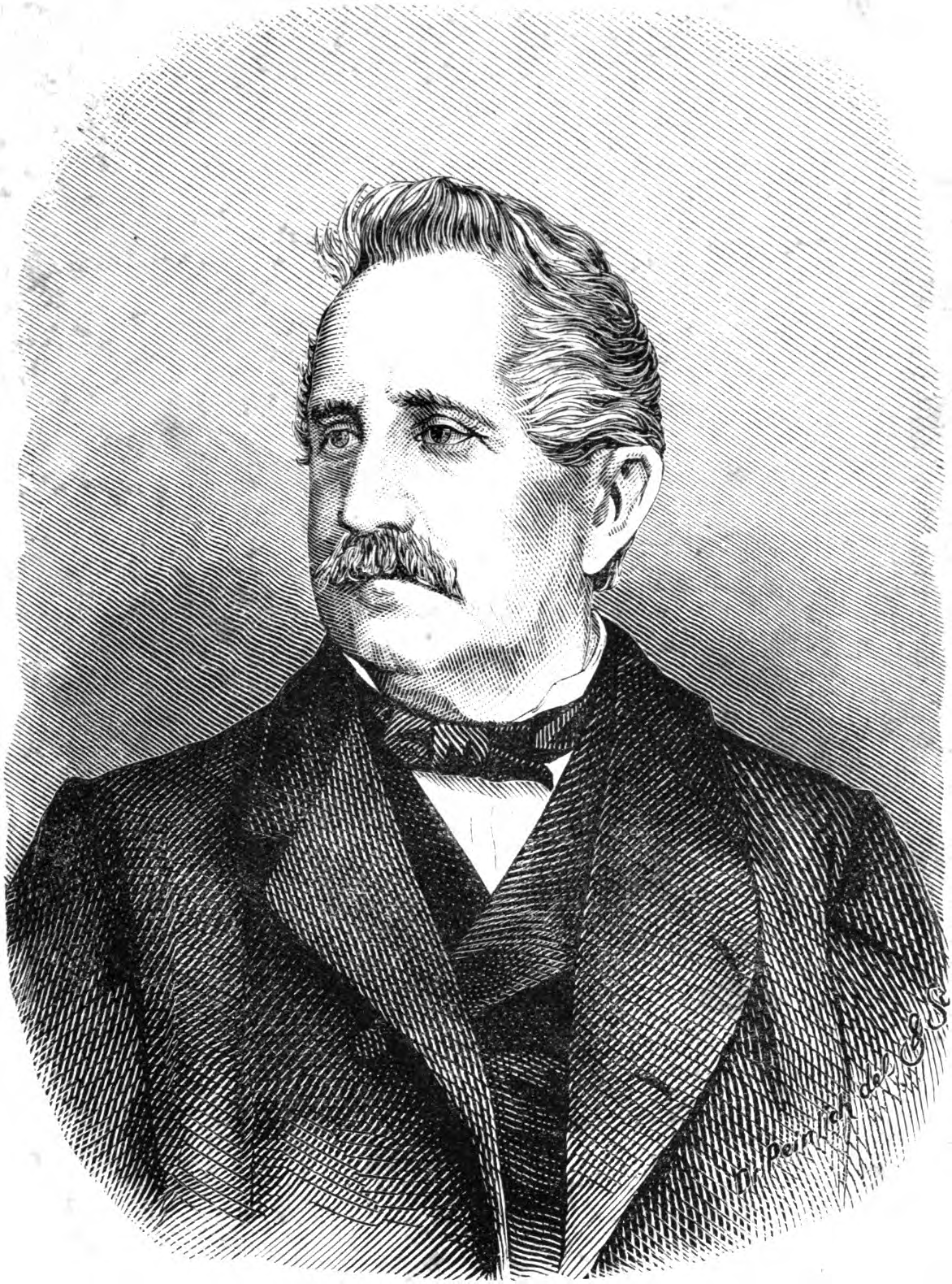
- Gaj c. 1875
- Born: Ludwig Gay; 8 August 1809; Krapina, Kingdom of Croatia, Austrian Empire
- Died: 20 April 1872 (aged 62); Zagreb, Croatia-Slavonia, Austria-Hungary
- Resting place: Mirogoj Cemetery, Zagreb, Croatia
- Occupations: Linguist; politician; journalist; writer
- Known for: Gaj's Latin alphabet
- Movement: Illyrian movement
- Spouse: Paulina Krizmanić (m. 1842)
- Children: 5

Ljudevit Gaj (/ɡaɪ/; Croatian: [ʎûdeʋit ɡâːj]; born Ludwig Gay;; 8 August 1809 – 20 April 1872) was a Croatian linguist, politician, journalist and writer. He was one of the central figures of the pan-Slavist Illyrian movement.

== Biography ==
=== Origin ===
He was born in Krapina (then in Varaždin County, Kingdom of Croatia, Austrian Empire) on August 8, 1809. His father Johann Gay was a German immigrant from the Kingdom of Hungary, and his mother was Juliana (née Schmidt), the daughter of a German immigrant arriving in the 1770s.

The Gajs were originally of Burgundian Huguenot origin. They arrived to the Kingdom of Hungary in Batizfalva (now Batizovce, Slovakia) in 16th or 17th century. Thence they became serfs of Mariassy de Markusfalva and Batizfalva families in 18th century. As there were a lot of ethnic Germans in that area, the Gajs were soon Germanised. Ljudevit's father originates from a branch that moved to the village of Markušovce.

Ljudevit completed high school in Varaždin, Zagreb and Karlovac, and he studied philosophy in Vienna and Graz (graduated in 1828) and law in Budapest (1829-1831).

=== Orthography and other work ===
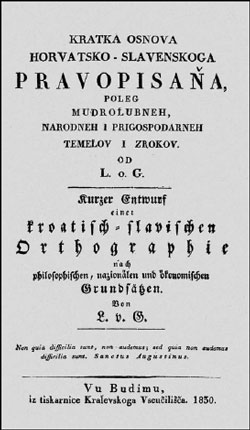
Concise Basis for a Croatian-Slavonic Orthography (1830)

Gaj started publishing very early; his 36-page booklet on stately manors in his native district, written in his native German, appeared already in 1826 as Die Schlösser bei Krapina.

In Buda in 1830 Gaj's Latin alphabet was published via "Concise Basis for a Croatian-Slavonic Orthography", which was the first common Croatian orthography book (after the works of Ignjat Đurđević and Pavao Ritter Vitezović). The book was printed bilingually, in Croatian and German. The Croatians used the Latin alphabet, but some of the specific sounds were not uniformly represented. Gaj followed the example of Pavao Ritter Vitezović and the Czech orthography, using one letter of the Latin script for each sound in the language. He used diacritics and the digraphs lj and nj.

The book helped Gaj achieve nationwide fame. In 1834, he succeeded where fifteen years before Đuro Matija Šporer had failed: he obtained an agreement from the royal government of the Habsburg monarchy to publish a Croatian daily newspaper. He was known as an intellectual leader thereafter. On 6 January 1835, Novine Horvatske ("The Croatian News") appeared, and on 10 January the literary supplement Danicza horvatzka, slavonzka y dalmatinzka ("The Croatian, Slavonian, and Dalmatian Daystar"). The "Novine Horvatske" were printed in Kajkavian dialect until the end of that year, while "Danic[z]a" was printed in Shtokavian dialect along with Kajkavian.

In early 1836, the publications' names were changed to Ilirske narodne novine ("The Illyrian People's News") and Danica ilirska ("The Illyrian Morning Star"), respectively. This was because historians at the time hypothesised Illyrians had been Slavic and were the direct forefathers of the present-day South Slavs.

In addition to his intellectual work, Gaj was also a poet. His most popular poem was "Još Hrvatska ni propala" ("Croatia is not in ruin yet"), which was written in 1833.

=== Death ===
Gaj died in Zagreb, Kingdom of Croatia-Slavonia, Austria-Hungary, in 1872 at the age of 62. He is buried at Mirogoj Cemetery.

== Personal life ==
Gaj married 26-year-old Paulina Krizmanić, niece of an abbott, in 1842 at Marija Bistrica. They had five children: daughter Ljuboslava, and sons Velimir, Svetoslav, Milivoje, and Bogdan.

== Legacy ==
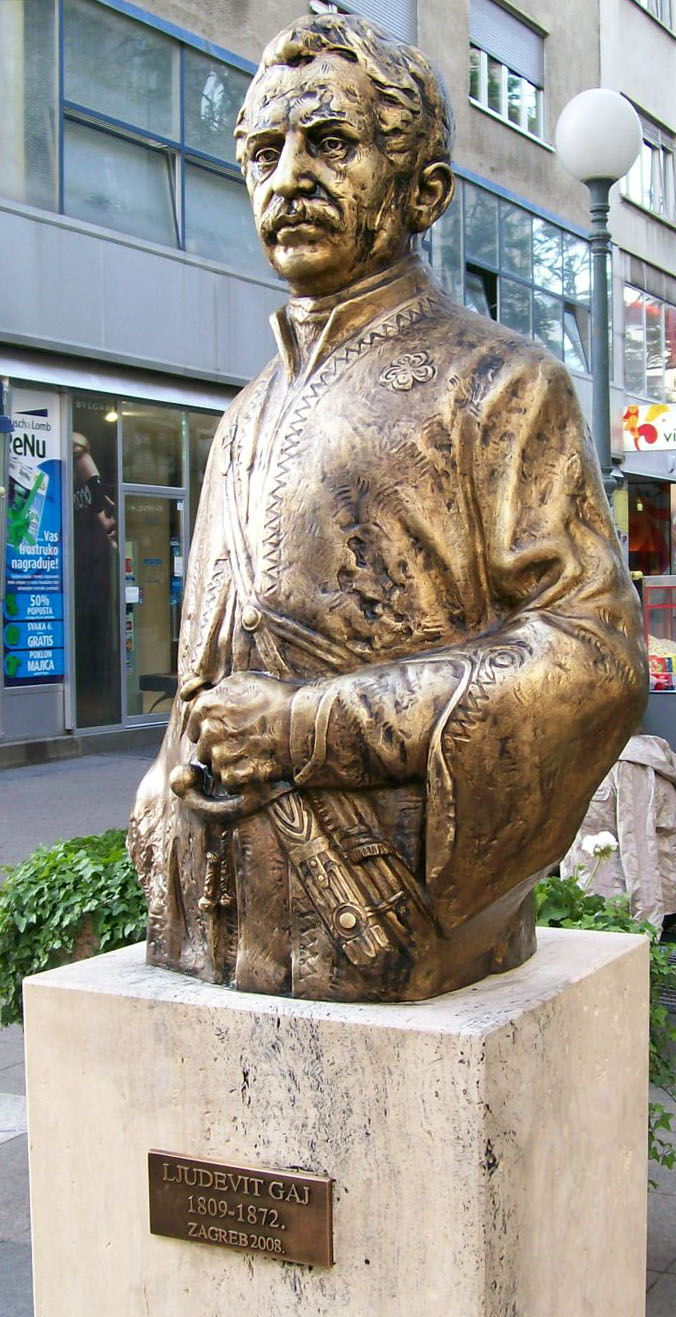
Statue in Zagreb

In 2008, a total of 211 streets in Croatia were named after Ljudevit Gaj, making him the fourth most common person eponym of streets in the country.

=== Linguistic legacy ===
The Latin alphabet used in the Serbo-Croatian language is credited to Gaj's Kratka osnova Hrvatskog pravopisa. Gaj followed the example of Pavao Ritter Vitezović and the Czech orthography, making one letter of the Latin script for each sound in the language. Following Vuk Karadžić's reform of Cyrillic in the early nineteenth century, Ljudevit Gaj in the 1830s performed the same operation on the Latin script, using the Czech system and producing a one-to-one symbol correlation between Cyrillic and Latin as applied to the Serbian or Croatian parallel system. The Slovenian alphabet, introduced in the mid-1840s, is also a variation of Gaj's Latin alphabet, from which it differs by the lack of the letters ć and đ.

== Works ==
- Die Schlösser bei Krapina sammt einem Anhange von der dortigen Gegend in botanischer Hinsicht [The Castles by Krapina with an Appendix of the Local Area of a Botanical Nature] (in German). Karlovac. 1826. Link to 2nd ed.

== See also ==
- Illyrian movement
- Romantic nationalism
- Croatian language

== Bibliography ==
- "Blaž Stulli Ludevitu Gaju 1841" [Blaž Stulli to Ljudevit Gaj in 1841]. Građa za povijest književnosti hrvatske (in Serbo-Croatian). 5: 310. 1907.
- "Gajev pravopis" [Gaj's Orthography]. Vienac: zabavi i pouci (in Serbo-Croatian). Vol. XXIII, no. 39. 1891.
