= We're Going Separate Ways =

- Croatian: Naši se putovi razilaze
- Directed by: Šime Šimatović
- Written by: Ivan Šibl
- Starring: Bata Grbić; Saša Novak; Boris Hržić; Miloš Jeknić; Joža Gregorin; Mira Nikolić
- Cinematography: Frano Vodopivec
- Edited by: Boris Tešija
- Music by: Vladimir Rajterić-Kraus
- Production company: Jadran Film
- Release date: 19 July 1957
- Running time: 94 min
- Country: Yugoslavia
- Language: Serbo-Croatian

We're Going Separate Ways (Naši se putovi razilaze) is a Croatian World War II melodrama directed by Šime Šimatović. It was released in 1957 and preserved by Croatian national archive. The film was seen as perpetuating socialist realist ideology in Yugoslavia, and fared badly with both critics and audiences. The film was exported to East Germany, Czechoslovakia, Hungary and the United States.

== Plot summary ==
The film is set during World War II in Zagreb. Partisan Vjera Dogan (Saša Novak) breaks up with fellow activist Mirko (Bata Grbić). She admits to him she has fallen in love with Vilko Klančar (Boris Hržić), impressed with the way he withstood torture at a police interrogation. However, Vilko has actually turned informant, and Vjera's poor judgment will affect the destinies of people around her.

== Cast ==
- Bata Grbić as Mirko
- Saša Novak as Vjera Dogan
- Boris Hržić as Vilko Klančar
- Miloš Jeknić as Spinach
- Joža Gregorin as Inspector Maraš
- Rudolf Kukić as Alojzije Žganjer
- Mira Nikolić as Nada
- Milan Milošević as Goran Koren
- Adam Vedernjak as Davor Vuković
- Viktor Bek as the doctor
- Krunoslava Ebrić Frlić as the landlady
- Tanja Kraus as the chemist
