= H-8 (film) =

- Argentine promotional poster
- Directed by: Nikola Tanhofer
- Written by: Zvonimir Berković; Tomislav Butorac
- Starring: Đurđa Ivezić; Boris Buzančić; Antun Vrdoljak; Vanja Drach; Marijan Lovrić
- Cinematography: Slavko Zalar
- Edited by: Radojka Tanhofer
- Music by: Dragutin Savin
- Release date: July 15, 1958
- Running time: 105 minutes
- Country: Yugoslavia
- Language: Serbo-Croatian

H-8 is a 1958 Yugoslav film directed by Nikola Tanhofer starring Đurđa Ivezić, Boris Buzančić, and Antun Vrdoljak.

== Plot ==
During a rainstorm, a reckless car driver causes the collision of a bus and a truck on a two-lane road between Zagreb and Belgrade. The film covers the events on the bus and the truck leading up to the crash, and the lives of the characters who end up in the crash.

== Cast ==
- Đurđa Ivezić as Alma Novak
- Boris Buzančić as Journalist Boris
- Antun Vrdoljak as Photographer
- Vanja Drach as Krešo
- Marijan Lovrić as Rudolf Knez
- Mira Nikolić as Young Mother
- Antun Nalis as Thief Ivica
- Mia Oremović
- Stane Sever
- Pero Kvrgić
- Marija Kohn
- Fabijan Šovagović
- Ljubica Jović
- Ivan Šubić
- Siniša Knaflec

== Background ==
The movie is based on a true story, in which the driver that caused a fatal 1957 bus-truck collision was never identified. "H-8" is the beginning of that driver's license plate, the only available information on the culprit's vehicle.

== Reception ==
In a 1999 poll among 44 Croatian film critics and film historians, H-8 placed second in the list of all-time best Croatian films, behind One Song a Day Takes Mischief Away. In a similar 2020 poll, it placed first.

== Awards ==
- H-8 won the Big Golden Arena for Best Film at the 1958 Pula Film Festival.

== See also ==
- List of Yugoslav films
