= Juraj Šporer =

Croatian physician and writer

Juraj Matija Šporer
- Born: 24 March 1795; Karlovac, Habsburg monarchy
- Died: 1 August 1884 (aged 89); Rijeka, Austria-Hungary
- Occupations: physician and writer
- Relatives: father: Josip Šporer, the first mayor of Karlovac and one of its first Freemasons
- Writing career
- Notable works: "Almanak ilirski"; "Kastriota Škenderbeg: tugokazie u pet izvedah"
- Movement: Illyrian movement

Juraj Matija Šporer or Đuro Matija Šporer or George Sporer or Đuro Matić Šporer (1795–1884) was a Croatian medical doctor and writer who was one of the forerunners of the Illyrian movement. Šporer was the first Croatian person who attempted to publish a native 'Illyrian' language newspaper. His attempts failed because of the complete lack of interest for newspaper published in his native language.

== Family, education and professional career ==
Šporer was born in Karlovac in 1795 in Habsburg monarchy. His father Josip, originally from Bribir, was the first mayor of Karlovac under French control (as part of the Illyrian Provinces), appointed directly by Napoleon and one of the first Freemasons in Karlovac.

Šporer began attending the gymnasium in Zagreb, continued in Senj and completed it in Zagreb. He graduated with a degree in medicine and philosophy at University of Vienna and received the status of physician in 1819. Šporer worked as a physician in Karlovac, Bakar, Rijeka, Split, Klagenfurt and Ljubljana. After he was retired in 1851 he moved to Rijeka where he lived until his death on 1 August 1884.

== Bibliography ==
Under the influence of his father and against the approval of Austrian emperor Francis II, in 1818 Šporer was the first Croatian person who made an attempt to publish a newspaper (Oglasnik Ilirski) in his native (Serbo-Croatian: domorodnom) language. His plans were to publish it in Vienna twice per week. In this attempt he was supported by Aleksa Praunsperger from Samobor and Aleksa Vancuš from Zagreb. He failed to realize his idea to publish this magazine because of the complete lack of interest in a newspaper published in his native language. In 1823 he published "Almanah Ilirski" in Karlovac. He signed his name as Matić.

In 1849 Šporer published his tragedy on Skanderbeg (Kastriota Škenderbeg: tugokazie u pet izvedah) and depicted Skanderbeg as Slav who united all South Slavs from Istria to Krujë.

== Bibliography ==
- Juraj Matija Šporer (1849). Kastriota Škenderbeg: tugokazie u pet izvedah.
- "Odziv iz prošlosti" - 1863, memoirs
