= Vanja Drach =

- Born: 1 February 1932; Bošnjaci, Sava Banovina, Yugoslavia
- Died: 6 September 2009 (aged 77); Zagreb, Croatia
- Occupation: Actor
- Years active: 1958–2009

Vanja Drach (1 February 1932 – 6 September 2009) was a Croatian theatre and film actor.

His film and television credits include H-8, Lud, zbunjen, normalan, Gospa, Charuga, Kapelski kresovi, Nikola Tesla, Svjedoci.

Between 1957 up to his retirement in 1998, he acted in the Croatian National Theatre in Zagreb, apart from the period 1975–81 when he was member of the troupe Teatar u gostima. In 2005 he received the Vladimir Nazor Award for lifetime achievement in theatre.

In 2005, Vanja Drach was operated for a tumor on his vocal cords, but eventually the cancer spread to his lungs. He died in the Clinical Hospital "Jordanovac", a respiratory disease clinic (today part of the University Hospital Centre).
