= Joža Horvat =

Croatian writer (1915–2012)

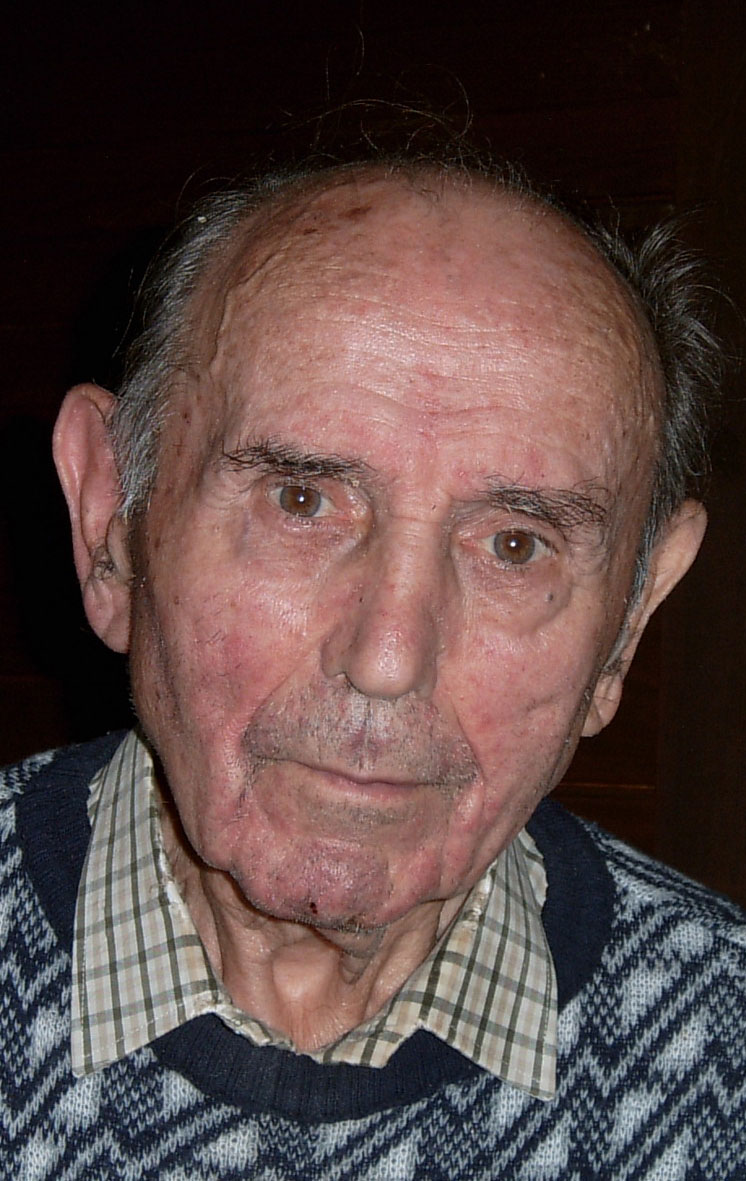
- Horvat in 1997
- Born: Josip Horvat; 10 March 1915; Kotoriba, Kingdom of Hungary, Austria-Hungary
- Died: 26 October 2012 (aged 97); Zagreb, Croatia
- Occupation: Writer
- Spouse: Renata Horvat (née Jesensky)
- Children: Radovan–Mićo (died 1973); Marko (died 1975)
- Relatives: Zlatko Horvat (brother), Helena Horvat, Diana Horvat (grandchildren)
- Writing career
- Pen name: Joža
- Period: 1935
- Genre: novele
- Notable works: Ciguli Miguli (1952); Mačak pod šljemom (1962); Besa–brodski dnevnik (1973); Operacija "Stonoga" (1982); Waitapu (1984); Svjedok prolaznosti (2005)
- Notable awards: Vladimir Nazor Award for lifetime achievement in literature; Order of Danica Hrvatska

Josip "Joža" Horvat (10 March 1915 – 26 October 2012) was a Croatian writer. He was the author of many novels, short stories, dramas, screenplays, essays and radio dramas, translated into at least nine languages, including Russian, Chinese and Esperanto.

== Life and career ==
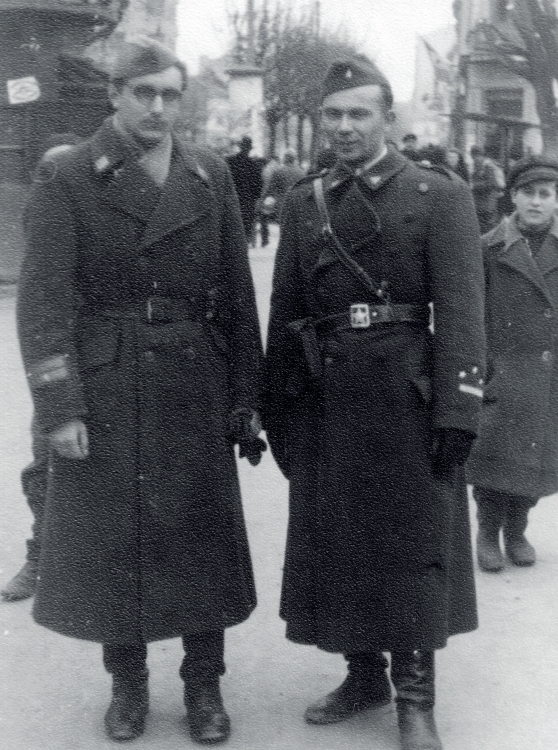
Major Franjo Tuđman and Captain Joža Horvat, 1945

Horvat was born in Kotoriba, Međimurje, northern Croatia, at the time in Zala County in Hungary. During World War II he fought in Yugoslav Partisans, which later inspired the novel Mačak pod šljemom (Tomcat under a Helmet, 1962) which had a somewhat ironical view of the partisan movement, adapted both into a feature film and a miniseries. The screenplay Ciguli Miguli (1952), critical of bureaucracy, briefly brought him into disfavour with the Communist party authorities, on which occasion he turned to sailing.

In mid-1960s Horvat and his family sailed the world in the sailing yacht Besa, and his travel journal Besa–brodski dnevnik (Besa–Ship's Log, 1973) became a best-seller. The second trip around the world was marked by tragedy: Horvat's older son, who stayed back, died in a traffic accident in 1973, and his younger son drowned in Venezuela in 1975.

After a period of deep crisis Horvat published two acclaimed novels inspired by these events, Operacija "Stonoga" (Operation "Centipede", 1982), about a search for a lost island in the Atlantic, and Waitapu (1984), about a Pacific Islander boy who decides to sail across a taboo line. His last work is a memoir titled Svjedok prolaznosti (A Witness to Impermanence, 2005).

Horvat attended the Faculty of Philosophy in Zagreb and served as a secretary of Matica hrvatska.
