= The Galoshes of Fortune =

- Short story by Hans Christian Andersen
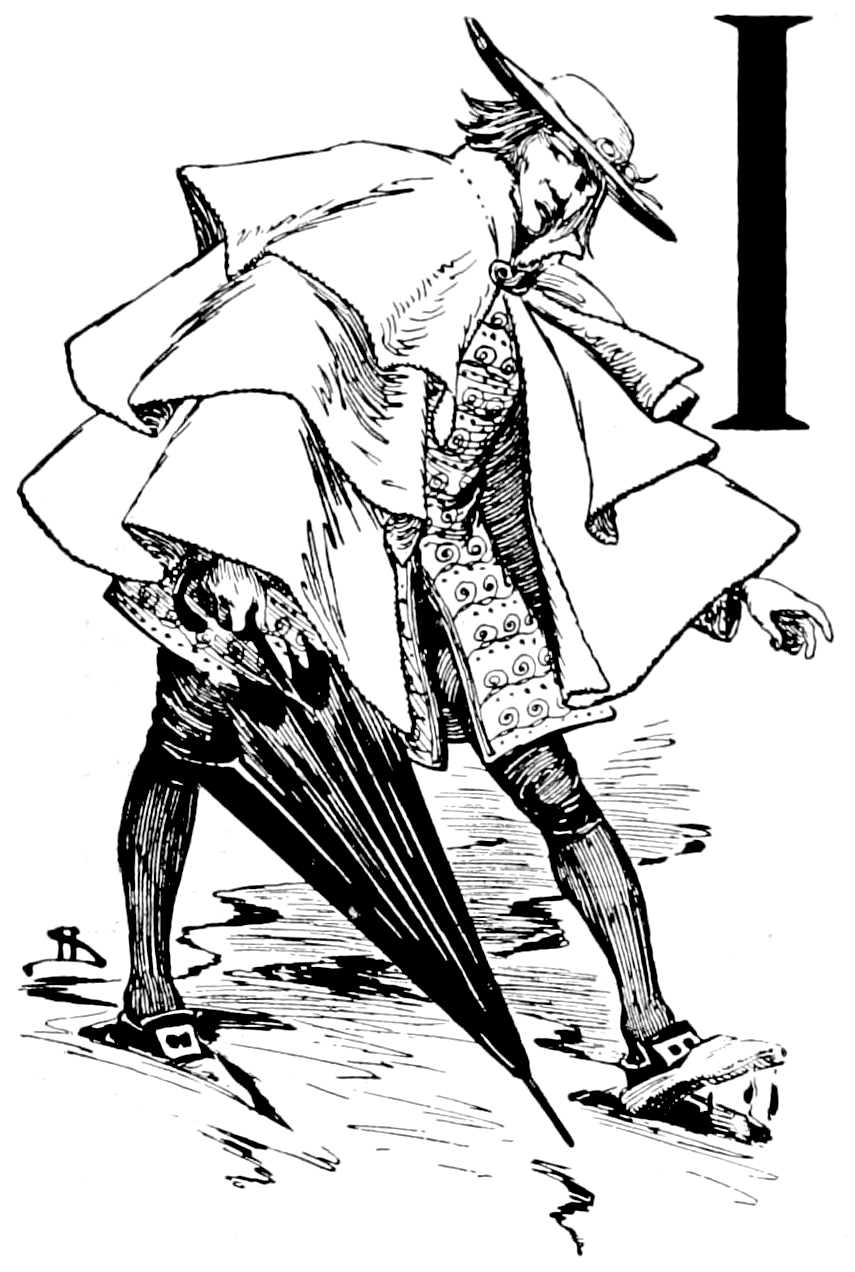
- 1889 illustration by Helen Stratton
- Original title: Lykkens Kalosker
- Country: Denmark
- Language: Danish
- Genre: Literary fairy tale

Publication
- Published in: Three Poetical Works. (Tre Digtninger.)
- Publication type: Anthology
- Publisher: C. A. Reitzel
- Media type: Print
- Publication date: 19 May 1838

Chronology
Only a Fiddler	The True Soldier

"The Galoshes of Fortune" (Danish: Lykkens Kalosker) is a literary fairy tale by Hans Christian Andersen about a set of wish-granting shoes, possibly inspired by the folktale of the "seven-league boots" (syvmilestøvler). Some English translations name the story as, "The Magic Galoshes."

The tale was first published by C. A. Reitzel in Copenhagen, Denmark on 19 May 1838 with The True Soldier (one-act verse play) and "That Was Done by the Zombie" (poem) in Three Poetical Works.

Reitzel paid Andersen 40 rixdollars for the story. In the tale, Andersen continues to perfect his colloquial style. Andersen read the tale aloud in the late 1830s with his novel Only a Fiddler. The tale irritated the young Danish philosopher Søren Kierkegaard with its satirical portrait of a bird that babbles on endlessly in a philosophical vein.

== Plot ==
The story is set in Copenhagen. A group of guests are holding a large party. During the festivity Councilor of Justice Knap argues that the Middle Ages were a time better than their own, more specifically the time of King Hans. Suddenly two fairies arrive, dressed up as house maids. One is old, Dame Care, the other is a minion of Dame Fortune. She has brought a pair of galoshes along that can grant person's every wish and transport whoever wears them to whatever time, place or condition in life that he desires. Dame Care predicts that such a gift will nevertheless only bring the person misfortune and regret.

As the party concludes Councilor Knap decides to go home. He finds the galoshes, puts them on and is sent back to the reign of King Hans. He is not immediately aware of what happened, but does notice that the unpaved streets are full with filth and mud. He notices a procession for the Bishop of Seeland and assumes it's for the bishop from his time period. As he wants to cross the bridge to Palace Square he notices it's gone and ask two men in a boat where the bridge is and that he wants to go to Christian's Harbour on Little Market Street. The men have no idea what he is talking about and Knap has trouble understanding their speech, which he assumes is an accent that belongs to people of Bornholm. As a result, he continues his walk, frustrated that not only the bridge is gone and all the lights are out, but that there are also no cabs to take. He decides to walk back to the East Street, but to his amazement the East Gate is now a meadow. Knap assumes he must be ill and desperately wants to go home, but he can't recognize any of the buildings. As he enters a tavern he tries to find his local paper, but they don't have it. When he notices a woodcut of a meteor over Cologne he wonders where the owners "got this rare old print?". As he discusses the content he gets into a conversation in Latin with a man who holds a bachelor in theology. They discuss many topics and Knap keeps misinterpreting these medieval topics for events that happened in his own lifetime. For instance, he confuses a remark about the Black Plague with a reference to a cholera epidemic in the 19th century. As the evening continues they all begin to drink more and Knap is repulsed by the vulgar behaviour of the people. He decides to sneak out, but the others pull him back from under the table by his feet, thereby pulling off the galoshes and breaking the spell. Waking up in his own age Knapp assumes it was all a dream and now fancies his own time period as the best.

Next, a watchman tries the galoshes on. He wishes to be the lieutenant, because he assumes his life is much better than his. The galoshes do their work and suddenly the watchmen becomes the lieutenant, sitting at his desk. He notices the lieutenant had written a poem called, "If Only I Were Rich", which confesses that the lieutenant actually feels he is short on money and is lonely as a result. Then he realizes he would rather be a watchman, because he at least has a wife and children who share his joy and sorrows. The galoshes then transform him back into himself. The watchman, still unaware what has happened, watches a falling star. He wishes he could travel to the Moon and suddenly the galoshes send him there at the speed of light. There he meets several Moon men who all wonder whether Earth is inhabited and decide this must be impossible. Back on Earth the lifeless body of the watchman is found and he is brought to a hospital, where they take his shoes off, breaking the spell again. He awakens and declares it to have been the most terrible night he had ever experienced.

As the galoshes remain in the hospital one of the young night interns tries them on. His task is to guard the hospital fence, but he wishes to get out for a while, wondering whether he "could get his head through the fence and escape." As soon as he thinks this his head is stuck and he's unable to pull it back. He struggles for a while, until he wishes he was free again, which is granted by the galoshes. The next day the intern attends a theatrical play called My Grandmother's Spectacles in Kannike Street. The spectacles in the play are able to let anyone who wears them read the future from people's faces. The internee wishes he had such a pair of glasses and soon enough he has them. As he witnesses into the spectators' on the front row's hearts he notices many bizarre views. He concludes he must have had too much blood rushing to his head and wishes he could take a Russian steam bath. Suddenly he is indeed there, but fully clothed and scaring off the other people in the room. He has enough sense to pull himself together and tell everybody it's part of a bet. He then returns home and the next day he has a blistered back.

Meanwhile, the watchman picks up the galoshes at the hospital and turns them in at the police station where they are accidentally given to a clerk whose galoshes happened to have been lost too. During a walk the clerk meets a friend who is a poet and desires to live his life, for it seems to be much more enjoyable than his. At first the clerk enjoys being a poet full of inspiration. Then he wishes he was a lark, but is caught by a little boy and sold off to a family, where he is put inside a cage. He talks with a canary and parrot, who both lament the days when they were still free. As it so happens the cage door is open and the clerk tries to fly away, but is attacked by a cat. He manages to fly back to his own home, where the spell is broken again.

Then the fairy tale concludes with the clerk's neighbour, a theological student, asking for the galoshes. The clerk gives them to him. As the student walks away he wishes he could travel to Switzerland and Italy, whereupon he is on top of the Mont Blanc. In the freezing weather he wishes he was on the other side of the Alps, where he ends up in Italy, near Lake Thrasymene. There he enjoys the beautiful landscapes, but he is confronted with the local people's hunger and poverty. He concludes that it would be better off if his body could rest, while the spirit flies on without it. The galoshes grant his wish and he is now peacefully dead. Andersen concludes with a quote by Solon: "Call no man happy until he rests in his grave." Dame Care then tells the other fairy that her gift had failed to bring mankind happiness just as she had predicted. She takes the galoshes off the student's feet, causing him to be brought back to life, and takes them away with her.
