= Kolo (magazine) =

Kolo is a Croatian literary magazine published by Matica hrvatska.

== History and profile ==
The magazine was founded by Stanko Vraz in 1842. Matica hrvatska became its publisher in 1847. In 1851, the publishing of Kolo temporarily ceased (replaced by Neven, which was in turn replaced by Vienac).

The popular Bosnian Serb poem, and later song, Emina by Aleksa Šantić was first published in Kolo in 1902.

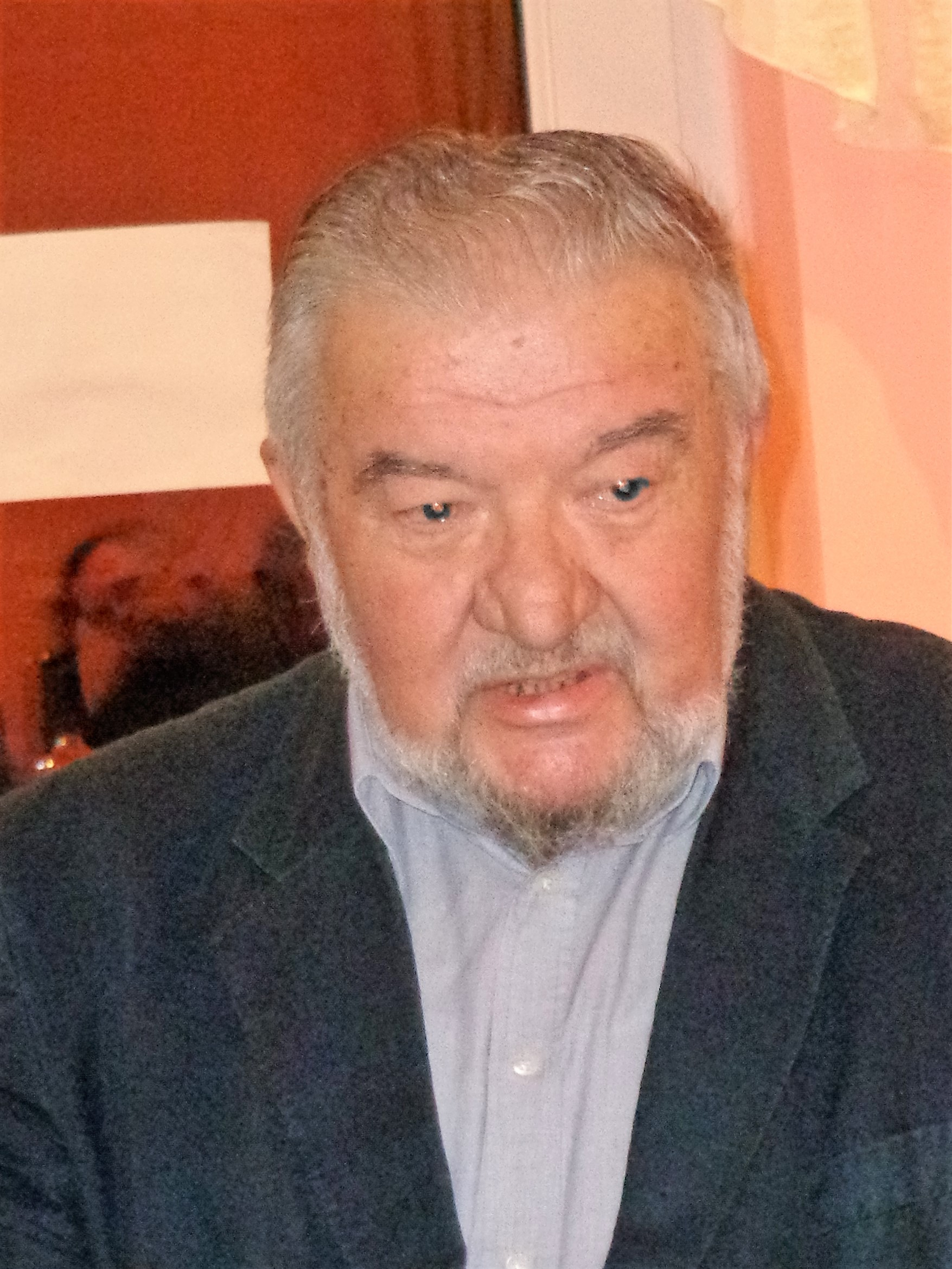
Ernest Fišer

Editors of Kolo have included Marijan Matković, Joža Horvat, Slavko Kolar, Gustav Krklec, Vjekoslav Kaleb, Vlatko Pavletić, Milivoj Slaviček, Miroslav Vaupotić, Igor Zidić.
