= Osekovo =

- Village
- Interactive map of Osekovo
- Country: Croatia
- County: Sisak-Moslavina County

Area
  - Total: 34.0 km^{2} (13.1 sq mi)

Population (2021)
  - Total: 705
  - Density: 20.7/km^{2} (53.7/sq mi)
- Time zone: UTC+1 (CET)
  - Summer (DST): UTC+2 (CEST)

Osekovo is a village in Croatia.

== Population ==
Year	Residents
2001	1,018
2011	853
2021	705

== Geographical Location ==
The village of Osekovo is located in central‑eastern Croatia, within Sisak‑Moslavina County and administratively part of the Popovača municipality. The village lies at coordinates 45°31′ N and 16°37′ E, approximately 100 kilometers southeast of the capital, Zagreb.

Osekovo is situated in a low, flat plain within the Sava River basin, adjacent to wetlands and floodplain forests of the Lonjsko Polje Nature Park, one of the largest protected wetlands in Croatia. The surrounding environment features fertile agricultural land and rich biodiversity, including migratory birds and aquatic wildlife, making it part of the network of protected natural areas in the Sava River valley.
