= Martin in the Clouds =

1961 Croatian film directed by Branko Bauer

- Directed by: Branko Bauer
- Written by: Fedor Vidas
- Starring: Boris Dvornik; Ljubica Jović; Joža Šeb; Braco Reiss; Antun Nalis; Nela Eržišnik; Ljerka Prekratić
- Cinematography: Branko Blažina
- Edited by: Blaženka Jenčik
- Music by: Aleksandar Bubanović
- Production company: Jadran film
- Release date: 7 April 1961 (Zagreb)
- Country: Yugoslavia
- Language: Serbo-Croatian

Martin in the Clouds (Serbo-Croatian: Martin u oblacima) is a 1961 Croatian film directed by Branko Bauer, starring Boris Dvornik and Ljubica Jović.

This movie established Boris Dvornik as a big star of former Yugoslav cinema, comparable to Ljubiša Samardžić, Milena Dravić, and Velimir "Bata" Živojinović (with whom he later developed a close friendship). In 1999, a poll of Croatian film critics found it to be one of the best Croatian films ever made.

== Plot ==
The central character of the film is Marin Barić (Boris Dvornik), a law student who lives as a tenant in the spacious apartment of the Solar couple on Marulić Square in Zagreb. When the Solars head to the seaside for four months, with Mr. Solar engaged in archaeological research and Mrs. Solar (Lila Andres) enjoying the beach, Martin is left alone in the apartment with the responsibility of taking care of their dog, Cezar. Martin and his girlfriend Zorica (Ljubica Jović), also a student, who lives across the courtyard in a rented room, fantasize about buying a joint apartment. Learning of their desire to acquire their own property, Martin's naive, talkative, and scatterbrained uncle Vjenceslav Barić (Joža Šeb), an inventor, comes up with the idea of renting out the empty Solar apartment to an Italian businessman named Carmine (Antun Nalis), who is coming to Zagreb with his daughter Marcella (Ljerka Prekratić), and using the money earned as a down payment for the apartment. Along the way, the uncle intends to try and sell some of his inventions to the Italian. The uncle also finds a real estate agent, Richard Eugene Mrazek (Braco Reiss), who convinces Martin, who is hesitant, to quickly decide to buy a new apartment after they view it. However, after receiving the money, Mrazek repeatedly fails to provide the apartment documents, and he becomes impossible to locate. Zorica strongly dislikes the entire plan, and the charming young Italian Marcella arouses her jealousy. Everything becomes even more complicated when the Solars announce their early return due to bad weather in Dalmatia, and Martin discovers that Mrazek has deceived them, as well as many others, by selling them an apartment on the seventh floor of a building with only six floors.

== Analysis ==
This is a light-hearted comedy told in a classic narrative style and is considered the last film of what is known as Bauer's golden period in his career. By playfully exploring the conflict between the protagonist's dreams and desires with reality, Bauer directed one of the most successful Croatian comedies of all time, leaving most of the darker and more cynical social and psychological meanings as subtle connotations. "Martin in the Clouds" particularly characterizes the thematic exploration of the emerging consumer society. Besides the widely present theme of housing, consumer culture is depicted through various motifs such as the Zagreb Fair, Zorica's discreet but noticeable interest in fashion, and the characters of the Italian father and daughter, Carmine and Marcella, representing Western manners and lifestyle.

The influence of popular culture is evident in the involvement of Ivo Robić, a major star of that era, who performed the title song, "Balada o Martinu" (Ballad of Martin). It's believed that one of the reasons Bauer embarked on making a film with a housing theme was the success of the comedy "Zajednički stan" (The Joint Apartment) directed by Marijan Vajda, which was made a year earlier in 1960 by Belgrade's Avala Film and was considered one of the "domestic blockbusters."

One of the most well-known analyses of "Martin in the Clouds" sees it as a metaphor for an unrealized sexual relationship. "In 'Martin in the Clouds,' the longing for a non-existent studio apartment is nothing more than the longing for an unfulfilled sexual relationship." Bauer was inspired by Hollywood comedies in creating "Martin in the Clouds" because he "saw in Vidas's story the possibility of structuring layered comedy, he saw a space that could be organized in a manner akin to classic Hollywood dramaturgy."

== Cast ==
- Boris Dvornik as Martin Barić
- Ljubica Jovic as Zorica
- Joža Šeb as Vjenceslav Barić
- Antun Nalis as Carmine
- Braco Reiss as Robert Eugen Mrazek (Kliker)
- Ljerka Prekratic as Marcella
- Lila Andres as Solarica (as Lila Anders)
- Nela Eržišnik as Prevarena zena
- Rikard Simonelli as Darko
- Vera Misita as Darkova Znanica
- Fahro Konjhodžić as Hrvoje
- Mato Petricic
- Jozo Petricic
- Josip Marotti as Projektant
- Sanda Fiderseg as Pazikuća
