= Master of His Own Body =

1957 film by Fedor Hanžeković

Master of His Own Body (Svoga tela gospodar) is a 1957 Croatian film by Fedor Hanžeković, based on the 1942 short story of the same name by Slavko Kolar.

== Sources ==
- Svoga tela gospodar at lzmk.hr (in Croatian)
