= Danica ilirska =

Croatian literary magazine

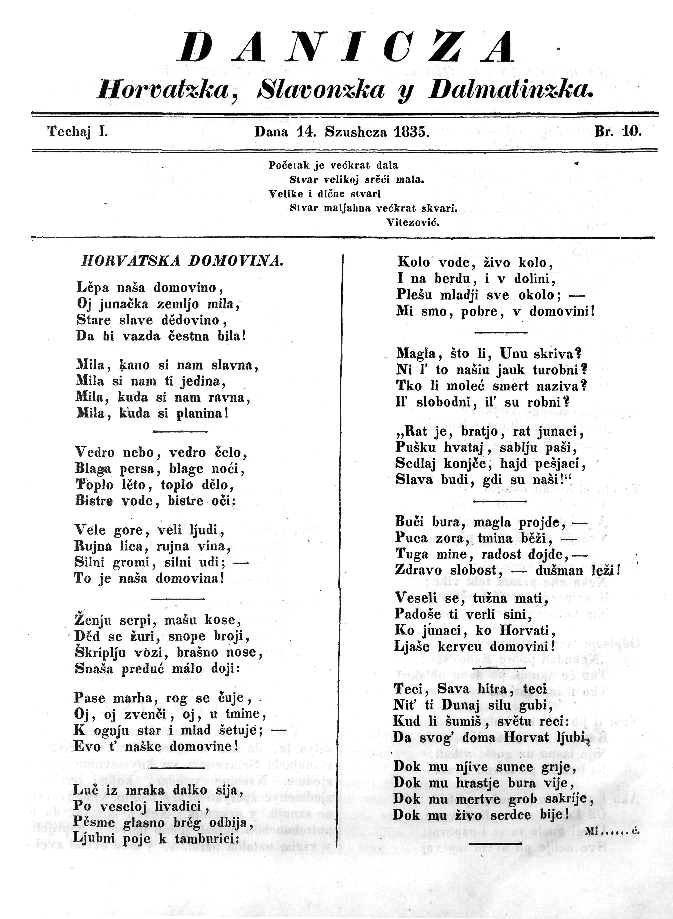
- 14 March 1835 cover
- Type: Literary magazine
- Founder: Ljudevit Gaj
- Publisher: Ljudevit Gaj
- Editor-in-chief: Ljudevit Gaj 1835–1850s
- Launched: January 10, 1835
- Ceased publication: 1867
- Language: Croatian
- City: Zagreb
- Country: Kingdom of Croatia

Danica ilirska was the first Croatian literary magazine launched on 10 January 1835 as a weekly supplement to Novine horvatske newspaper in Zagreb, the Kingdom of Croatia.

It was initially published under the title of Danicza horvatzka, slavonzka y dalmatinzka (Danica of Croatia, Slavonia and Dalmatia) and edited by a leader of the Croatian national revival Ljudevit Gaj. The name was a reference to the personification of the morning star in Slavic mythology and to the lands of the Triune Kingdom claimed by the proponents of the Croatian national revival – the kingdoms of Croatia, Slavonia, and Dalmatia. On 2 January 1836, the magazine was renamed Danica ilirska in reference to the name used by Count Janko Drašković in his Dissertation, the political programme of the Croatian national revival – which likewise became known as the Illyrian movement. Drašković used the term in reference to proposed unified Croatian lands in the Habsburg monarchy. When the Illyrian name and symbols were banned, the magazine reverted to its original name on 2 January 1843 until the end of 1848. It switched to Danica ilirska again in January 1849, but ceased publication on 30 June 1849. The issues published in 1835–1849 were reprinted in five volumes in 1970–1972 during the period of the Croatian Spring. Danica ilirska reappeared briefly in 1853, but was discontinued due to low circulation. It was printed and once again in 1863–1867, when Gaj's son Velimir took over the editor's function and then shared those responsibilities with Antun Mažuranić, Dragutin Rakovac, Vjekoslav Babukić, Bogoslav Šulek, and Dimitrija Demeter.

The Novine horvatske did not have licence to write and distribute political news until 1848, and therefore Danica ilirska was used as the central newspaper of the Illyrian movement. Its roles included popularisation of Illyrian movement ideology and patriotic poems. One such poem, Horvatska domovina by Antun Mihanović first appeared on the front page of the issue published on 14 March 1835 – before it became the Croatian national anthem. Danica ilirska made a significant contribution to popularisation of the Shtokavian dialect and reforms of orthography proposed by Gaj.
