= Branko Marjanović =

Branko Marjanović (12 May 1909 – 13 February 1996) was a Croatian and Yugoslav film director and editor.

== Biography ==
His father was the writer, literary critic and filmmaker Milan Marjanović. He was born in Zagreb. He graduated from drama school there, gained movie experience in Prague and worked on educational filming in Zagreb.

During World War II, he led the Croatian production, directed, wrote, produced and edited the film, and after the war he continued with the director and editor work even on a feature film.

Marjanovic directed the film Ciguli Miguli, a 1952 Yugoslav political satire. It was meant to be the first satirical film of the post-World War II Yugoslav cinema, but its sharp criticism of bureaucracy was politically condemned by the authorities and the film was banned as "anti-socialist".

Giving up film making, he devoted himself to documentaries about nature ("Small Miracles of nature big", "Marmot," Griffon Vulture "). He received the Vladimir Nazor Award. He died in Zagreb.

== Sources ==
- Polimac, Nenad. "Branko Marjanović – The Great Documentarist". kinotuskanac.hr. Croatian Film Association.
- Zečević, Slaven (2009). "Put do Opsade – dugometražni igrani filmovi Branka Marjanovića" [A way to Opsada – Branko Marjanović's feature films] (PDF). Hrvatski Filmski Ljetopis (in Croatian). 15 (57–58). Zagreb: Croatian Film Association, Croatian State Archives and Croatian Society of Film Critics: 124–130.
