= Mia Oremović =

Croatian actress (1918–2010)

- Born: 31 July 1918; Požega, Kingdom of Croatia-Slavonia, Austria-Hungary
- Died: 24 July 2010 (aged 91); Križevci, Croatia
- Occupation: Actress
- Years active: 1942–2006

Mia Oremović (31 July 1918 – 24 July 2010) was a Croatian theatre, film and television actress.

== Selected filmography ==
- It Was Not in Vain (1957)
- H-8 (1958)
- I Have Two Mothers and Two Fathers (1968)
- One Song a Day Takes Mischief Away (1970)
