= In the Storm (film) =

1952 film by Vatroslav Mimica

In the Storm (U oluji) is a Croatian film directed by Vatroslav Mimica. It was released in 1952.
