= Nikoletina Bursać =

Poster for the movie “Nikoletina Bursać”

Nikoletina Bursać is a 1964 Yugoslavian film directed by Branko Bauer. It is based on a famous novel by the Bosnian Serb writer Branko Ćopić. Both the novel and the film describe the adventures of a Yugoslav Partisan machine-gunner Nikola "Nikoletina" Bursać, a tough man with a noble and gentle heart.

== Plot ==
The film follows the life and wartime encounters of Nikoletina Bursać as he engages in an imaginary dialogue with a statue of his late son. We see Nikoletina joining the partisans and starting a relationship with Erna, a Jewish girl who survived the massacre of her village.
