= Sinji galeb =

1953 film by Branko Bauer

Sinji galeb is a 1953 Croatian film directed by Branko Bauer. It is based on the Cyan-Blue Seagull Brotherhood (Slovene: Bratovščina Sinjega galeba), a novel written by the Slovene writer Tone Seliškar.

== Plot summary ==
A boy named Ive (Rizvanbegović) sails out to sea with his friends in order to make money to pay off his father's debt. Ive and his friends name their boat Sinji galeb ("Cyan-Blue Seagull"). While sailing, they run into maritime criminals led by Lorenco (Nalis).
