= Nikola Tanhofer =

Croatian film director

- Born: 25 December 1926; Sesvete, Kingdom of Serbs, Croats, and Slovenes
- Died: 24 November 1998 (aged 71); Zagreb, Croatia
- Occupations: Film director Screenwriter; Cinematographer
- Years active: 1945–1976

Nikola Tanhofer (Croatian pronunciation: [nǐkola tânhoːfer]; 25 December 1926 – 24 November 1998) was a Croatian film director, screenwriter and cinematographer. His first film as director, It Was Not in Vain was entered into the 7th Berlin International Film Festival.

His most accomplished film, H-8 (1958), won him a Golden Arena award at the Pula Film Festival. After two less successful films, the psychological war drama Osma vrata (1959) and Sreća dolazi u 9 (1961), the first Yugoslavian feature film with fantastical elements, he directed two somewhat more successful ones, Dvostruki obruč (1963) and Svanuće (1964). After directing Bablje ljeto (1970), he devoted himself to teaching at the Department for Film and Television Cinematography, which he founded in 1969 at the former Academy For Theater, Film And Television in Zagreb. He wrote Filmska fotografija (Film Photography) in 1981.

== Filmography ==
- Plavi 9 (1950)
- It Was Not in Vain (1957)
- H-8 (1958)
- Klempo (1958)
- Osma vrata (1959)
- Sreća dolazi u 9 (1961)
- Dvostruki obruč (1963)
- Svanuće (1964)
- Bablje ljeto (1970)

== Notes ==
- Yugoslavian Film Encyclopedia, Yugoslavian Lexicographic Institute "Miroslav Krleža", 1986–1990
