= Stone Horizons (1953 film) =

1953 film by Šime Šimatović

- Kameni horizonti
- Directed by: Šime Šimatović
- Written by: Vjekoslav Kaleb; Šime Šimatović
- Starring: Irena Kolesar; Marko Soljacic; Boris Tesija
- Release date: 1953
- Running time: 89 minutes
- Country: Yugoslavia
- Language: Croatian

Stone Horizons (Kameni horizonti) is a 1953 Croatian film directed by Šime Šimatović.
