= Only People (film) =

1957 film by Branko Bauer

Only People (Samo ljudi) is a 1957 Yugoslav film directed by Branko Bauer, starring Tamara Miletić and Milorad Margetić.

In 1999, a poll of Croatian film critics found it to be one of the best films ever made in Croatia.
