= Koncert (1954 film) =

1954 film by Branko Belan

Koncert is a Yugoslav film directed by Branko Belan. It was released in 1954. Oktavijan Miletić was the cinematographer for the film.
