= Slavko Kolar =

Croatian writer

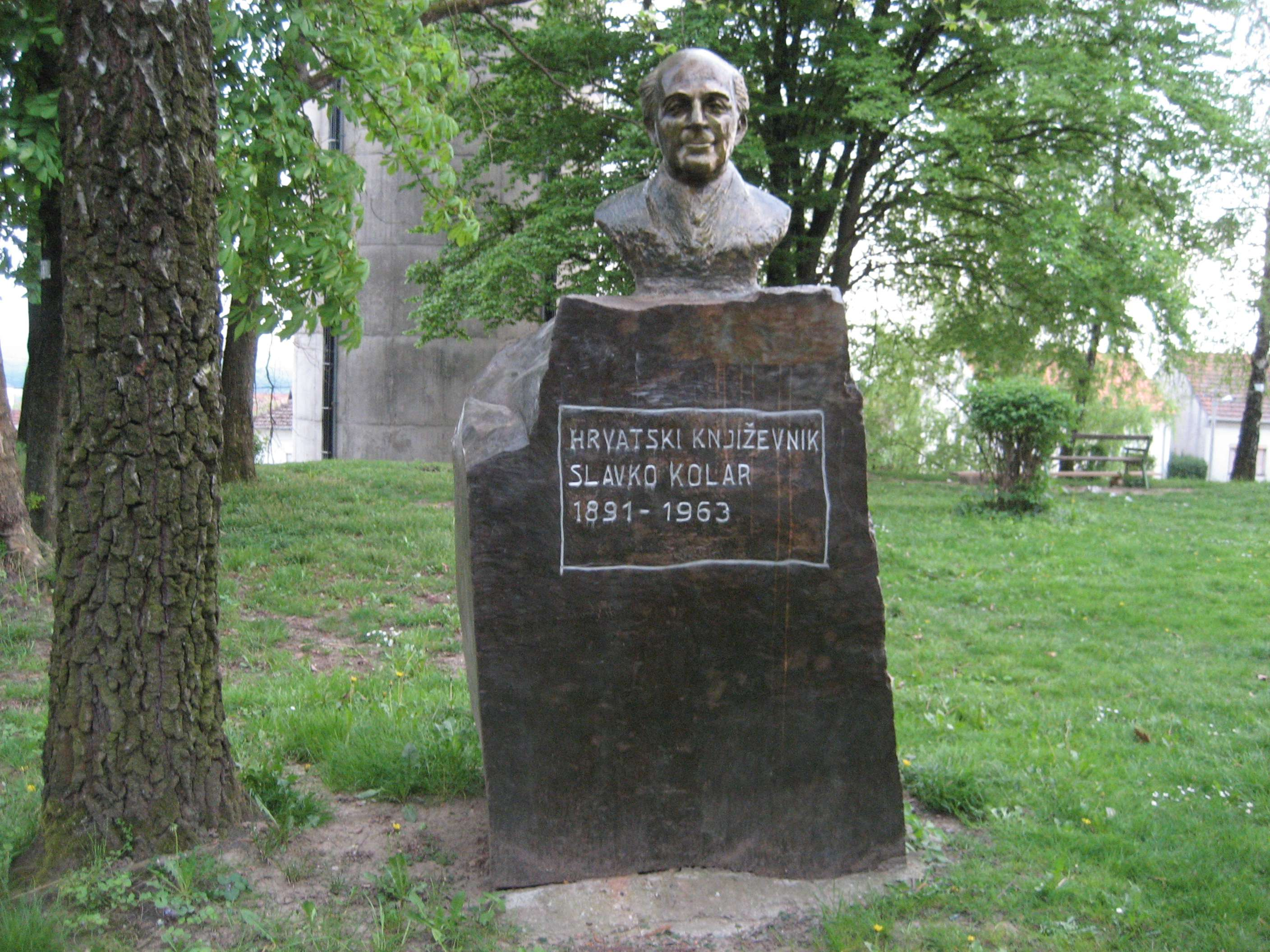
- Born: 1 December 1891; Garešnica, Kingdom of Croatia-Slavonia, Austria-Hungary (now Garešnica, Croatia)
- Died: 15 September 1963 (aged 71); Zagreb, SFR Yugoslavia (now Zagreb, Croatia)
- Occupation: writer

Slavko Kolar (Croatian pronunciation: [slǎːʋko kǒlar]; 1 December 1891 - 15 September 1963) was a Croatian writer.

Slavko Kolar is interred at Mirogoj Cemetery in Zagreb at the location 62 – II/I 18.

== Selected works ==
- Nasmijane pripovijesti (1917)
- Ili jesmo - ili nismo (1933)
- Mi smo za pravicu (1936)
- Svoga tijela gospodar (1942)
- Natrag u naftalin (1946)
- Glavno da je kapa na glavi (1956)
