= Lapitch the Little Shoemaker (TV series) =

- Also known as: Hlapićeve nove zgode
- Genre: Animated children's series
- Based on: Lapitch the Little Shoemaker by: Milan Blažeković; Pajo Kanižaj; Ivo Škrabalo; The Brave Adventures of Lapitch by Ivana Brlić-Mažuranić
- Written by: Peter Hynes; Alastair Swinnerton; Tony Barnes; Jill Brett; John Grace
- Directed by: George Roubicek (voice/English version); Sean Barrett (voice/English version)
- Voices of: Teresa Gallagher (English version); Nigel Greaves (English version); Liza Ross (English version); Peter Marinker (English version); Toni Barry (English version); George Roubicek (English version); Sean Barrett (English version); Colin Bruce (English version)
- Opening theme: Lapitch Song
- Ending theme: Lapitch Song (instrumental) sung by The Munich English Children's Choir
- Composers: Hermann Weindorf; Curtis Briggs
- Country of origin: Croatia
- Original language: Croatian
- No. of seasons: 1
- No. of episodes: 26

Production
- Running time: 30 min.
- Production company: Croatia Film

Original release
- Release: 1 September 2002 – 10 March 2003

Lapitch the Little Shoemaker (Croatian: Hlapićeve nove zgode, German: Lapitch der Kleine Schummacher) is a Croatian animated television series from Croatia Film and EM.TV/HaffaDiebold, with animation by Neptuno Films of Barcelona, Spain. It is a spin-off from the 1997 film of the same name.

Returning from the film are the title character, Lapitch the mouse, and his girlfriend Lisa, along with their pets Brewster and Pico. For the series, a character called Melchior replaces Master Scowler's role.

The show was formerly aired on Tiny Pop in the United Kingdom.

== Episodes ==
No.	Title	Original release date
1	"Brewster's Birthday"	September 1, 2002
Lapitch goes looking for Brewster, who is in the care of the Pazinskis to participate in a dangerous circus stunt.
2	"The Secret Village"	September 8, 2002
Dirty Rat (who originally perished in the 1997 film but actually survived) steals Lapitch's magic boots. However in a secret squirrel village, the boots have other plans.
3	"Very Cross Country"	September 15, 2002
Lapitch and Lisa participate in a cross country race. Dirty Rat wants Melvin Raccoon to win as his ticket to getting the prize.
4	"The Shoe Queen"	September 22, 2002
Lapitch and Lisa decide to help Lerbil take care of the tyrant Shoe Queen Buchinksi who is in league with Dirty Rat.
5	"Never Kid a Kidnapper"	September 29, 2002
Dirty Rat has the Pazinskis kidnap Melchior to make him magic boots. Melchior however has other ideas.
6	"Thanks for the Remedy"	October 6, 2002
Lapitch and Lisa gather ingredients for a magic potion to cure Melchior's illness. This potion also interests Dirty Rat and the Pazinskis.
7	"The Great Slipper Slip Up"	October 13, 2002
Cinderella II goes with Lisa to Mr. Blower to make a glass slipper, while Dirty Rat helps the evil Princess Enid to marry Prince Rupert.
8	"The Candy Man"	October 20, 2002
Dirty Rat steals Melchior's secret candy recipe and hands it to the Candy Man Schelqior, who is Melchior's cousin.
9	"What Goes Up"	October 27, 2002
Lapitch, Lisa and Melchior get stranded in a hot air balloon while Yanna, Pico and Brewster have trouble with Melchior's shoemaking machine.
10	"All That Glistens"	November 3, 2002
Dirty Rat and the Pazinskis run a ball dance to frame Lapitch of theft. Lisa helps Lapitch to clear his name.
11	"Gibbering Goldfish"	November 8, 2002
Melvin finds a goldfish named Joshua who can grant a wish. Dirty Rat sees this as a golden opportunity, but Lapitch helps protect Joshua.
12	"A Haunting We Will Go"	November 17, 2002
Dirty Rat and his cronies head off to a castle in the hopes to find treasure. Coincidentally Lapitch and his friends are heading there to deliver some mended shoes.
13	"Percival the Pest"	November 24, 2002
A pig named Percival comes to the village, but the next day the town-square is trashed. Percival blames it on the Pazinskis, but they are innocent this time, so who could the real culprit be?
14	"The Sound of Silence"	December 1, 2002
Melchior has created a key that can open virtually anything, but Dirty Rat finds out, placing the key in danger. Pico tries to hide the key, but talks too much that his voice dies, and worse, the key is taken anyway.
15	"Missing Melchior"	December 8, 2002
Melchior goes to Diamond Mountain to talk about creating magic-boots, but Melvin seems intent on getting those boots.
16	"The Sky is Falling"	December 13, 2002
While Melchior is stargazing, he hears rumors that a meteor will strike the earth, terrifying the populace. Yanna however, has a strange bowl that she believes will save the day.
17	"Post Office"	December 22, 2002
One night Otis and Elmer break into Lapitch's workshop, but he catches them red-handed. Word however spreads, and Dirty Rat and the Pazinskis wish to find out what the villagers are up to.
18	"The Great Book Caper"	December 29, 2002
One day Yanna was cleaning her house and tells Lapitch her books are "worth more than gold", unfortunately the three eavesdropping Pazinskis took this statement a little too seriously, and the next day Yanna's books disappear.
19	"Musical Interlude"	January 7, 2003
Yanna and Melchior are practising for the big music festival, as the famous musicians the Violinskys are coming. Unfortunately the Pazinskis steal their violins in exchange for magic butterbeans. Can the violins be saved?
20	"The Great Coach Robbery"	January 12, 2003
Lisa receives a golden whistle from Yanna should she ever get lost. Meanwhile Melchior has hurt his foot, forcing him to sit out the party Lisa and Lapitch are going to.
21	"Peace and Quiet"	January 19, 2003
The famous writer Grimsdale comes to the village to finish a book, and Lapitch gets to be his assistant, however Grimsdale cannot write while there's so much noise going on, complicating matters.
22	"Yanna and the Wise Woman"	January 26, 2003
Yanna receives a visit from her former school-teacher Esmeralda Rottwart, who has come to test Yanna's medical-skills.
23	"The War of the Weeds"	February 2, 2003
The War of the Weeds will make Melchior and Yanna sleep.
24	"The Most Magical Boots"	February 16, 2003
The Great Bombasto comes to the village, and claims to make literal magic boots, but is he being honest, or is this one big scam?
25	"High Noon"	March 2, 2003
Brewster gets a toothache, and is in so much pain he howls the whole night, preventing anyone from sleeping, but he refuses to see a dentist.
26	"Magical Gift"	March 10, 2003
Lapitch has to repair Melchior's favorite shoes, which are so old they disintegrate by simply being touched, so Lapitch tries to replace them with so-called magic boots.

== Voices ==
- Teresa Gallagher - Lapitch, Percival Periwinkle III (English version)
- Nigel Greaves - (English version)
- Liza Ross - Yanna, Brunhilda, Queen Rat, Auntie (English version)
- Peter Marinker - Dirty Rat (English version)
- Toni Barry - (English version)
- George Roubicek - (English version)
- Sean Barrett - Melchoir (English version)
- Colin Bruce - (English version)
