= Seán Barrett (actor) =

British actor (born 1940)

- Born: Seán Justin Barrett; 4 May 1940 (age 86); Hampstead, London, England
- Occupations: Actor; voice actor
- Years active: 1952–present

Seán Justin Barrett (born 4 May 1940) is a British actor.

== Career ==
=== Television and film appearances ===
Barrett began his career as a child actor, appearing on BBC children's television and in films such as Bang! You're Dead, Dunkirk, Sink the Bismarck!, A Cry from the Streets, War and Peace, The Genie and Four Sided Triangle.

Years later he made many appearances in television and films including ITV Television Playhouse, Z-Cars, The Wednesday Play, Cast a Giant Shadow, Emergency Ward 10, Chronicle, Armchair Theatre, Hell Boats, Moonstrike, Attack on the Iron Coast, Softly, Softly, BBC Play of the Month, Paul of Tarsus, Tales of the Unexpected, Father Ted, Holby City, Brush Strokes, Minder, Poldark, Noah's Ark and Theatre 625.

=== Voice actor and narrator ===
In 1968, Barrett was asked to join BBC Radio Drama by Ronald Mason.

In the mid-1970s Barrett was cast in the BBC Radio series of George Simenon's Inspector Maigret novels as Maigret's subordinate, Inspector Janvier. He has performed the voices of Asterix, Caius Tiddlius, Fulliautomatix, Roman Ghost, Cylindric, Mannikinpix, Gladiator Trainer and Jailer in the English version of The Twelve Tasks of Asterix, Tik-Tok in Return to Oz, a Goblin in Labyrinth, Big Mac and other characters in TUGS, Thadius Vent's soothsayer Goodtooth in Oscar's Orchestra, Melchoir in the English dubbed version of the Lapitch the Little Shoemaker TV series, Roly the Pineapple in the English version of The Fruities and UrSu the Dying Master and UrZah the Ritual-Guardian in The Dark Crystal as well as additional characters in two video games The Feeble Files and Viking: Battle for Asgard. He also provided the voice for Captain Orion in Star Fleet, the English version of the 1980s Japanese puppet series X-Bomber.

He also narrated Fair Ground!, Timewatch, People's Century and Dark Towers for BBC, dubbed voices in many anime films such as Roujin Z, Cyber City Oedo 808 and Dominion: Tank Police and has done voices for several audiobooks and radio stations.

In 1996, he was the narrator for the Channel 4 documentary series, Black Box. The series primarily concentrated on commercial aviation accidents, and the investigations related to them.

Barrett also worked as part of an ADR Loop Group on Aardman's animated film Flushed Away, a voice director on Lapitch the Little Shoemaker and a dialogue director on The Fruities. He has also narrated episodes of the BBC TV series People's Century and Dancing in the Street, as well as a number of BBC nature documentaries in the late 1990s and early 2000s.

In 2011, he voiced Andre of Astora, Petrus of Thorolund and Ingward in Dark Souls. He returned to voice Darkdiver Grandahl in Dark Souls II, and later reprised his role as Andre of Astora in Dark Souls III, as well as voicing Holy Knight Hodrick. In 2017, he voiced the Titan Azurda in Xenoblade Chronicles 2 and in 2018, reprised the role for Xenoblade Chronicles 2: Torna – The Golden Country.

He has voiced the first nine books of Mick Herron's "Slough House" series about Jackson Lamb's team.

== Record sleeve ==
In 1985, the rock band The Smiths used a still of Barrett as a teenager in the 1958 film Dunkirk for the sleeve of their hit single How Soon Is Now?

== Filmography ==
=== Film ===
- Four Sided Triangle (1953) – Young Robin
- The Genie (1953) -
- Game of Danger (1954) – Willy
- Escapade (1955) – Warren
- War and Peace (1956) – Petya Rostov
- Dunkirk (1958) – Frankie
- A Cry from the Streets (1958) – Don
- Sink the Bismarck! (1960) – Able Seaman Brown
- Sons and Lovers (1960) – Arthur Morel
- Cast a Giant Shadow (1966) – Junior British Officer
- Attack on the Iron Coast (1968) – Radio Man (uncredited)
- Great Catherine (1968) – Andrei Strelkin (uncredited)
- Hell Boats (1970) – Sub. Lt. Hendrickson, R.N.V.R.
- The Zoo Robbery (1973) – Watson
- Robin Hood Junior (1975) – Sergeant
- The Dark Crystal (1982) – UrSu the Dying Master, UrZah the Ritual-Guardian (voices)
- Return to Oz (1985) – Tik-Tok (voice)
- Labyrinth (1986) – Goblin (voice)
- Beneath Still Waters (2005) – Additional voices (English and Spanish dub)
- Renaissance (2006) – Naghib (voice)

=== Television ===
- The Twelfth Brother (1952) – Benjamin
- The Man in Armour (1952) – Ian Rowland
- Stranger in the House (1953) – Peter Benfield
- Thames Tug (1953) – Jimmy Spurgeon
- BBC Sunday-Night Theatre (1953–1956) – Richard Miller, Jimmy Sheelan
- Rheingold Theatre (1953–1956) – Tony Belfont, Timothy Mulligan, Brian
- The Coelacanth (1957) – Nicko
- Johnnie's Night Out (1954) – Johnnie O'Hanlon
- The Secret Way (1954) – John
- The Scarlet Eagle (1954) – Captain Giles
- The Adventures of the Big Man (1956) – Tom Lomas
- Flash (1956) – Joe Harvey
- Sword of Freedom (1958) – Brunetto
- The Mad O'Haras (1958) – Desmond Burke
- ITV Play of the Week (1959) – Ordinary seaman Frank Conway, Paul Legrand
- The Flying Doctor (1959) – Malcolm Parker
- Armchair Theatre (1959–1962) – Ralph, Clifford Ross
- Emergency Ward 10 (1960) – Martin Cole
- Paul of Tarsus (1960) – Timothy
- The Terrorists (1961) – 2nd Lt. Adams
- ITV Television Playhouse (1962) – Arthur
- Z-Cars (1962–1965) – Ashworth, Alan Guest, Arthur Carron
- BBC Sunday-Night Play (1963) – Michael
- Drama 61-67 (1963) – Mark
- Moonstrike (1963) – Paul de Montlucon
- The Sullavan Brothers (1964) – Tony
- Redcap (1964) – Private Kierney
- Theatre 625 (1964–1968) – Albino, Capt. Dakers
- The Flying Swan (1965) – John Grafton
- The Wednesday Play (1966) – Gus
- Softly, Softly (1967) – Jamie Gosse
- Look and Read (1967) – Will Kent
- Thirty-Minute Theatre (1967–1971) – Danny, Mike
- Mighty Jack (1968) – Father, Interrogator (voices, English)
- BBC Play of the Month (1972) – Temple
- 2nd House (1974) – Steven in Grace
- The Unbroken Arrow (1976) –
- Tales of the Unexpected (1981) – Hijack
- Look and Read: Dark Towers (1981) – Narrator
- Star Fleet (1982) – Captain Orion (voice)
- Look and Read: Through The Dragon's Eye (1989) – Gorwen the Dragon (voice)
- TUGS (1989) – Big Mac, Hercules, Captain Zero, Zebedee, Izzy Gomez, Fire Chief, Sea Rogue, and Blair (voice)
- Father Ted (1996) – Father Fitzgerald

=== Animation ===
- The Twelve Tasks of Asterix (1976) – Asterix, Caius Tiddlius, Fulliautomatix, Roman Ghost, Cylindric, Mannikinpix, Gladiator Trainer, Jailer, Verses
- Secret of Mamo (1978) – Koichi Zenigata (1996 Manga UK dub)
- Goodbye Lady Liberty (1989) – Koichi Zenigata
- Asterix and the Big Fight (1989) – Fulliautomatix, Legionnaires (British dub)
- The Fruities (1990) – Roly
- Cyber City Oedo 808 (1990) – Gogul (Gabimaru Rikiya)
- The Heroic Legend of Arslan (1991) – Silver Mask
- Roujin Z (1991) – 1st Ache
- Tokyo Babylon (1992) – Inspector Kono
- Dominion: Tank Police (1992) – Lt. Britain
- New Dominion Tank Police (1993) – Lt. Britain
- Oscar's Orchestra (1994) – Goodtooth
- Lapitch the Little Shoemaker (2000) – Melchoir
- Spheriks (2002) – Additional voices
- Azur & Asmar: The Princes' Quest (2006) – Le Sage Yadoa
- A Fox's Tale (2008) – Doc
- Mr. Baby (2009–10) – Mr. Baby, English dub

=== Video games ===
- The Feeble Files (1998) – Additional voices
- Viking: Battle for Asgard (2008) – Additional voices
- Dark Souls (2011) – Andre of Astora, Petrus of Thorolund, Ingward
- Dark Souls II (2014) – Darkdiver Grandahl
- Risen 3: Titan Lords (2014) – Additional voices
- Dark Souls III (2016) – Holy Knight Hodrik, Blacksmith Andre
- Total War: Warhammer (2016) – The Advisor
- Total War: Warhammer II (2017) – The Advisor
- Xenoblade Chronicles 2 (2017) – Azurda / Gramps
- Xenoblade Chronicles 2: Torna ~ The Golden Country (2018) – Azurda
- Super Smash Bros. Ultimate (2018) – Azurda
- Total War: Warhammer III (2022) – The Advisor

=== Audiobooks ===
- His Dark Materials – Lord Asriel/ Iorek Byrnison
- Bleak House by Charles Dickens – One of two narrators with Teresa Gallagher
- Barnaby Rudge by Charles Dickens – Narrator
- Terrorism and Communism: A Reply to Karl Kautsky by Leon Trotsky – Narrator
- The Holy Qur'an translated by Wahiduddin Khan – Narrator
- Muhammad: His Life Based on the Earliest Sources by Martin Lings – Narrator
- The Redeemer by Jo Nesbø – Narrator
- The Snowman by Jo Nesbø – Narrator
- The Leopard by Jo Nesbø – Narrator
- The Bat by Jo Nesbø – Narrator
- Police by Jo Nesbø – Narrator
- Perfume by Patrick Suskind – Narrator
- The Left Hand of God by Paul Hoffman – Narrator
- Of Human Bondage by W. Somerset Maugham -Narrator
- A Passion for Killing by Barbara Nadel – Narrator
- Molloy by Samuel Beckett – Narrator
- Malone Dies by Samuel Beckett – Narrator
- The Unnamable by Samuel Beckett – Narrator
- Lennox by Craig Russell – Narrator
- The Long Glasgow Kiss by Craig Russell – Narrator
- The Deep Dark Sleep by Craig Russell – Narrator
- Dead Men and Broken Hearts by Craig Russell – Narrator
- The Second World War by Antony Beevor – Narrator
- Berlin: The Downfall 1945 by Antony Beevor – Narrator
- Arnhem: The Battle for the Bridges, 1944 by Antony Beevor – Narrator
- Ardennes 1944: Hitler's Last Gamble by Antony Beevor – Narrator
- The Battle for Spain by Antony Beevor – Narrator
- Secret Warriors by Taylor Downing – Narrator
- Toward the Flame by Dominic Lieven – Narrator
- Young Stalin by Simon Sebag Montefiore – Narrator
- Watching you by Michael Robotham- Narrator
- The Age of Iron Trilogy by Angus Watson – Narrator
- Harlequin by Bernard Cornwell – Narrator
- Close your eyes by Michael Robotham – Narrator
- West of West Trilogy by Angus Watson- Narrator
- Slow Horses (Slough House Book 1) by Mick Herron – Narrator
- Dead Lions (Slough House Book 2) by Mick Herron – Narrator
- The List (A Slough House Novella, Book 2.5) by Mick Herron – Narrator
- Nobody Walks by Mick Herron – Narrator
- Real Tigers (Slough House Book 3) by Mick Herron – Narrator
- Spook Street (Slough House Book 4) by Mick Herron – Narrator
- London Rules (Slough House Book 5) by Mick Herron – Narrator
- The Drop (A Slough House Novella, Book 5.5) by Mick Herron – Narrator
- Joe Country (Slough House Book 6) by Mick Herron – Narrator
- The Catch (A Slough House Novella, Book 6.5) by Mick Herron – Narrator
- Slough House (Slough House Book 7) by Mick Herron – Narrator
- Bad Actors (Slough House Book 8) by Mick Herron – Narrator
- The Secret Hours by Mick Herron – Narrator
