= Lapitch the Little Shoemaker (film) =

- English edition logo
- Croatian: Čudnovate zgode šegrta Hlapića
- Directed by: Milan Blažeković
- Written by: Milan Blažeković; Pajo Kanižaj; Ivo Škrabalo; English adaptation: Alan Shearman
- Based on: The Brave Adventures of Lapitch by Ivana Brlić-Mažuranić
- Produced by: Željko Zima; International version: Steffen Diebold
- Starring: Ivan Gudeljević; Maja Rožman; Tarik Filipović; Pero Juričić; Relja Bašić
- Edited by: Mirna Supek-Janjić
- Music by: Original version: Duško Mandić; Srebrna krila Vladimir Kočiš; English version: Hermann Weindorf
- Production companies: Croatia Film; International version: HaffaDiebold; ProSieben; Neptuno Films
- Distributed by: America: Sony Wonder (VHS / DVD); Croatia: Croatia Film; Germany: ProSieben Home Entertainment (VHS)
- Release dates: 23 June 1997 (Croatia); 23 October 1997 (Germany); 8 February 2000 (America)
- Running time: 75 minutes (English version); 83 minutes (international cut); 85 minutes (Croatian version)
- Countries: Croatia; Germany
- Languages: Croatian; Dutch; English; German; Serbo-Croatian
- Budget: DM900,000

Lapitch the Little Shoemaker (Croatian: Čudnovate zgode šegrta Hlapića) is a 1997 animated feature that was originally released by Croatia Film. Produced on vintage cel equipment during the early 1990s, this was the third feature from Croatia Film's animation unit and director Milan Blažeković, after The Elm-Chanted Forest (1986) and The Magician's Hat (1990).

It is based on The Brave Adventures of Lapitch, a 1913 novel by Croatian author Ivana Brlić-Mažuranić. In this adaptation, all of the characters are animals, and the title character is a mouse, rather than the human character of the original work. As with the book, the film is about a shoemaker's apprentice who leaves the confines of his ill-tempered master, and sets off on an adventure. During his journey, he befriends a circus performer named Gita, and fights against the evil Dirty Rat.

Lapitch remains Croatia's most successful production in terms of viewership, and became the country's official selection for the 70th Academy Awards (in the Best Foreign Language Film category). Its popularity led to the production of a 26-episode television series, also called Lapitch the Little Shoemaker, at the end of the 1990s.

In February 2000, it first appeared in North America as the initial entry in Sony Wonder's short-lived "Movie Matinee" video series. The Disney Channel also premiered it on U.S. cable television later that same month.

== Plot ==
Original Croatian character names are in parentheses.

Lapitch (Šegrt Hlapić), an orphaned mouse, works in a small town as the Scowlers' apprentice, who consist of a mean shoemaker (Majstor Mrkonja) and his kind-hearted wife (Majstorica) with his dog, Brewster (Bundaš). Mr. Scowler awaits a visit from the pigs' Mayor (Gradonačelnik) and his son; Lapitch has to make sure the pigs' boots are the right size. Things do not go well when the Mayor's son tries on his boot. As a result, they leave. Lapitch tries to tell his master that it was not his fault, yet he still blames him for it. Mrs. Scowler apologises for her husband's bad behaviour. While he tidies up, she tells Lapitch that she and her husband used to be happier ages ago. Lapitch curiously wants to know why, but Mrs. Scowler vows only to tell him when he is older.

Lapitch writes a letter to the Scowlers before leaving town with the boots. Brewster eventually joins him the following morning. The two of them visit a young squirrel named Marco (Marko), who lives in a house with a blue star on one of its walls, at where they round up some geese that went astray while he was tending to the flock. At evening, Marco serves the group supper. An awkward raccoon, Melvin (Grga), eavesdrops on their conversation. Hearing of an artefact stored inside their house, he runs off to tell his cruel boss, Dirty Rat (Crni Štakor), about the goods.

Lapitch and Brewster bid farewell to the squirrels. While leaving for home, an afternoon of unusual weather culminates with an evening storm, forcing them to find shelter. They meet Dirty Rat under the bridge, who introduces himself as the "King of the Underworld". The next day, Lapitch wakes up shocked to see his boots gone. As he looks for them, he meets the orphaned Lisa (Gita) and her parrot Pico (Amadeus) who came from a circus whose ringmaster mistreated and left them behind. During their journey, the mice and their pets meet Melvin's mother and help her chop wood. Worried about her son's misbehavior, Melvin's mother gives Lapitch a lucky coin before they leave. Lapitch later gives Melvin the coin.

Soon, the group team up with other residents to extinguish a fire, but they make Melvin a suspect in the area's recent robbery string. In addition, the group encounters a poor cat-like warthog named Yana (Jana), whose magic powers give Lapitch the courage to face Dirty Rat. After the gang comes to the circus, Lisa entertains the patrons of an underused merry-go-round. By nightfall, she reunites with her horse, Blanka (Zorka). It was revealed that Dirty Rat made a deal with Lisa's ringmaster in which he vows to reach Marco's house by horse to steal the family chest. Lapitch and friends plan to stop him for good when they hear this.

Later on, they meet Mr. Scowler, whom Melvin has just rescued. Scowler tells them he was robbed and tied up to a tree for two days. They all set forth to defeat Dirty Rat; Melvin gives them a hand, but his boss ties him and puts him out of the way. Lapitch, guided by Yana, confronts Dirty Rat. Enraged, he has his horse charge straight at the little mouse, about to trample him. Suddenly, a bolt of lightning splits their harness; the rat and his cart fall from a cliff.

The clouds clear while everyone celebrates. Lisa tames Dirty Rat's horse and gives it to Melvin, who promises to live a good life after what he has gone through. The next day, Lapitch and the rest arrive at Marco's house, where his mother shows them the family's valuable treasure, along with Melvin's coin. They meet Marco's estranged father who was gone for a long time after working in a faraway land. A worried Mrs. Scowler is delighted to see everyone back again. By then, she and her husband finally recognise Lisa as their lost child Susanna. Afterwards, Mr. Scowler plays a melody on his violin as everybody dances to it. The Scowlers rekindle their relationship as the townspeople celebrate along with them. Eventually, Lapitch becomes the most respected shoemaker they've ever known.

== Cast ==
Croatian version
Actor	Role	
Actor	Croatian name	English name
Ivan Gudeljević	šegrt Hlapić	Lapitch
Maja Rožman	Gita	Lisa
Tarik Filipović	Amadeus	Pico
Tarik Filipović	Vlasnik vrtuljka	Merry-go-round owner
Pero Juričić	Bundaš	Brewster
Pero Juričić	Vlasnik cirkusa	Ringmaster
Relja Bašić	Crni Štakor	Dirty Rat / Black Rat
Vlado Kovačić	Majstor Mrkonja	Mr. Scowler
Marina Nemet	Majstorica	Mrs. Scowler
Hrvoje Zalar	Grga	Melvin
Ljiljana Gener	Jana	Yana
Zorko Sirotić	Marko	Marco
Ivana Bakarić	Markova majka	Marco's mother
Božidarka Frajt	Grgina majka	Melvin's mother
Emil Glad	Medo	Bear
Ivica Vidović	Markov otac	Marco's father
Mato Ergović	Gostioničar	Innkeeper
Mladen Crnobrnja	ptica Štef	Bird
Slavko Brankov	Jazavac	Badger
Sven Šestak	Lisac	Fox
Marinko Prga	Zec	Rabbit
Ivo Rogulja	Gradonačelnik	The mayor
Barbara Rocco	Praščić	The mayor's son
Zlatko Crnković	Pripovjedač	Narrator

English version
Actor	Role
Cathy Weseluck	Lapitch and Marco's Mother
Janyse Jaud	Yana, Marco and Melvin's mother
Jay Brazeau	Additional Voices
Andrea Libman	Lisa
Michael Dobson	Additional Voices
Terry Klassen	Dirty Rat
Ian James Corlett	Melvin
Maxine Miller	Additional voices
Gerard Plunkett	Additional voices
Robert O. Smith	Additional voices

German version
Actor	Role
Manuel Straube	Lapitch
Julia Kaufmann	Lisa
Michael Walke	Melvin

== Production ==
The Croatia Film company worked on Lapitch the Little Shoemaker from 1991 until 1997, with funding from the Ministry of Culture. The film was produced at a time when Croatia faced a slump in its animation industry, and had just begun to undergo its War of Independence. During production, the crew used cel cameras dating as far back as 1938. They also made Ivana Brlić-Mažuranić's title character a mouse, amid a roster of anthropomorphic animals.

Director Milan Blažeković had previously worked on several animated shorts and Professor Balthazar episodes for Zagreb Film, before heading on to direct 1986's The Elm-Chanted Forest and its 1990 sequel The Magician's Hat for the Croatia Film studio. For Lapitch, he also served as a screenplay writer and layout artist. The film featured a roster of well-known Croatian actors, among them Relja Bašić, Emil Glad, Tarik Filipović and Ivana Bakarić. Child actors Ivan Gudeljević and Maja Rožman played the title character and his girlfriend respectively.

Early in 1997, Croatia Film teamed up with two German entities—HaffaDiebold, a subsidiary of Constantin Medien, and the television station ProSieben—to create a new version of the film for the international market. With several altered scenes, and a reworked ending, this version was first dubbed for the German-speaking market, before being sold to over 70 territories worldwide. Sweden's TV1000 was among the first stations to air the HaffaDiebold edit on television, under the title Lapitch den lilla skomakaren.

The film's English-language dub was recorded in Vancouver, British Columbia, at Koko Productions and Airwaves Sound Design; Rainmaker Digital Pictures handled post-production. In this version, Canadian voice actress Cathy Weseluck provided the voice of Lapitch.

== Music ==
The music for the original version was composed by Duško Mandić, with songs written by crew member Pajo Kanižaj. Croatian musician Petar Grašo contributed to the production with the uncredited "Ljubav sve pozlati", part of which was heard in the end credits. Željko Zima, the film's producer, directed its music video. The song also appeared as the last track of Grašo's 1997 debut album, Mjesec iznad oblaka, published by Orfej and Tonika.

For the international version, Germany's Hermann Weindorf worked on a new set of songs and music, replacing Mandić's contributions. "Take My Hand", performed by Jane Bogart, took the place of "Ljubav sve pozlati". A German soundtrack of this version was released on CD and cassette by Ariola on 6 October 1997.

English song	Performed by	Original Croatian track
"Shoe Song"	Munich All-Stars Choir	"Pjesma cipelica"
"Dirty Rat"	Eric Brodka	"Pjesma Crnog Štakora"
"Farmers and Friends Forever"	Munich All-Stars Choir	"Pjesma žetelaca"
"Take My Hand" (Note: Not featured in the 2000 U.S. version.)	Manuel Straube; Maren Rainer	"Pjesma prognanika"
"Take My Hand (Pop Version)"	Jane Bogart	"Ljubav sve pozlati"

== Release and reception ==
In its revised form, Lapitch the Little Shoemaker was Croatia's sole competing entry in the 1997 edition of Portugal's Cinanima, a film festival focusing on animation. It was also Croatia's contender to the Academy Award for Best Foreign Language Film in 1997, and was one of two animated submissions in that category, along with Hayao Miyazaki's Princess Mononoke from Japan. Neither film, however, made it to the final list of nominations.

Lapitch went on to become the most successful theatrical release of Croatia's film industry (with over 355,000 viewers). In France, it has sold over 300,000 copies since TF1 Video released it in 1999. The German dub, from ProSieben Home Entertainment, sold up to 50,000 tapes by the end of 1999.

In North America, it was the first film to be released in Sony Wonder's "Movie Matinee" series. Originally planned for 12 October 1999, it was not available until 8 February 2000. This version runs 75 minutes, edited down from the original 83-minute European cut. Coupons for the Commodore Cruise Line were included with all copies of the tape. Arthur Taussig reviewed Lapitch in 2002. He wrote that the "conservative" animation in Croatian production is spiked with interludes of brilliance, beauty, and outstanding imagination. He concluded that despite the film not being on par with Disney, he called it charming, entertaining, and full of good ideas for young kids. The film received a seal of approval from the Dove Foundation, which gave it three stars out of five.

The German television channel ProSieben first aired Lapitch on 6 June 1998. On 27 February 2000, it received its U.S. television premiere on the Disney Channel.

The Croatian subsidiary of Egmont Publishing released a book adaptation of the film in 2001. Three years later, it saw its premiere on DVD, both in Croatia and the United States.

Lapitch the Little Shoemaker was followed by a spin-off television series of 26 episodes, entitled Hlapićeve nove zgode in its native Croatia. The 26-episode series was a co-production of Croatia Film and EM.TV/HaffaDiebold, with animation by Barcelona's Neptuno Films.

== See also ==
- List of animated feature-length films
- Cinema of Croatia
- List of submissions to the 70th Academy Awards for Best Foreign Language Film
- List of Croatian submissions for the Academy Award for Best Foreign Language Film

== Notes ==
Preceded by Nausikaya (1996)	Croatian submission to Best Foreign Language Film category, Academy Awards (U.S.); 1997	Succeeded by Transatlantic (1998)
Preceded by Pom Poko (1994) (Japan)	Animated films submission to Best Foreign Language Film category, Academy Awards (U.S.); 1997 (also Princess Mononoke) (Japan)	Succeeded by Manuelita (1999) (Argentina)
