= Brlić =

Brlić is a Croatian surname. Notable people with the surname include:

- Andrija Torkvat Brlić (1826–1868), Croatian writer, linguist, politician, and lawyer
- Vatroslav Brlić (1862–1923), Croatian politician and lawyer
- Ivana Brlić-Mažuranić (1874–1938), Croatian children's writer
