= Anita Andreis =

Croatian film composer

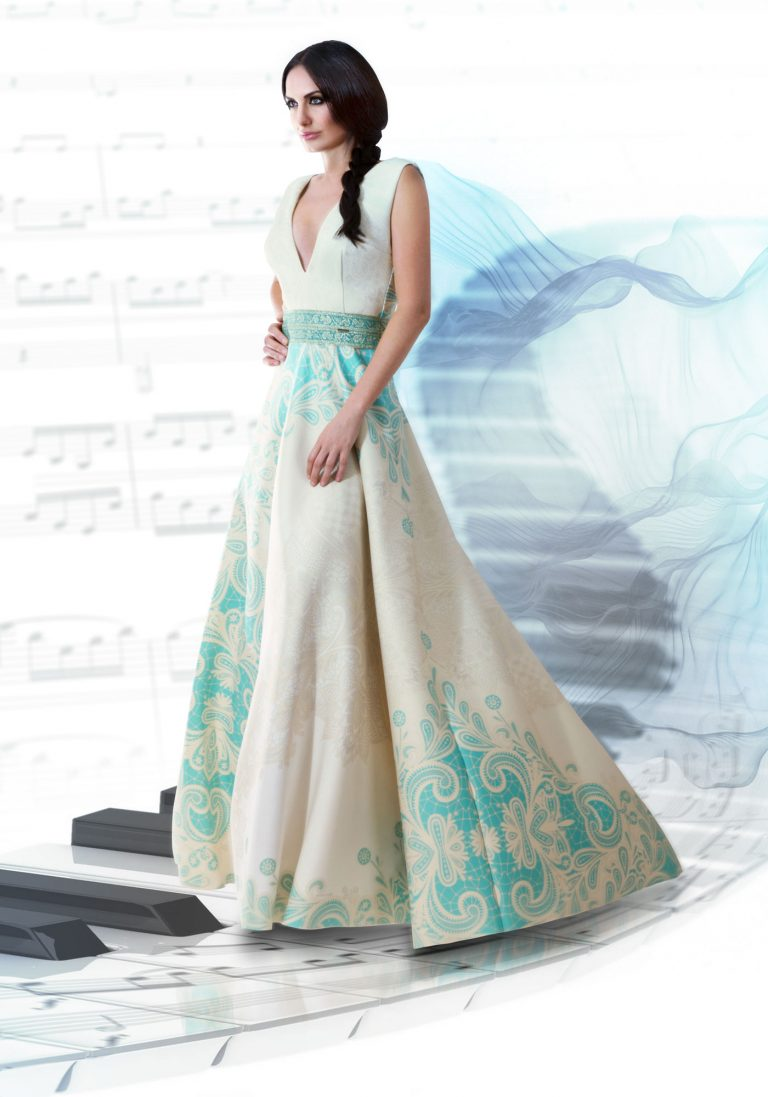
- In 2017

Background information
- Born: Anita Andreis; Zagreb, Croatia
- Genres: Film music; soundtrack; contemporary classical music; alternative pop; film score; indie rock
- Occupations: Film composer; singer; songwriter; musician; orchestrator
- Instruments: Vocals; piano; keyboards
- Years active: 2006–present
- Label: Clever Trick Music Publishing
- Website: anitaandreis.com

Anita Andreis (Zganec) is a Croatian composer, singer-songwriter, musician and producer in the field of film music. Andreis has worked on a variety of films, theatre and ballet productions, both independent and commercial. She has won three Best Film Music Awards for her musical scores to the animation films Guliver and Bobo.

== Early life ==
Andreis was born in Zagreb, Croatia, where she grew up and completed her early education. As a young child, she started learning to play the guitar and a piano. A film fan, Andreis set her sights on becoming a film composer and began composing at a young age. She started by studying classical music forms and works of composers of classical music by attending private classes. Her formal education continued at Berklee College of Music, where she first specialised in "Production of Music for Film and Games". After being awarded a celebrity Scholarship of Michel Camilo she completed her Master studies of "Orchestration for Film and TV."

== Career ==
=== Film music ===
As of 2019, she has collaborated with Croatian, Russian and American film directors, including Silvije Petranovic, on the most-watched Croatian children's film of the 21st century:The Brave Adventures of a Little Shoemaker based on a 1913 novel The Brave Adventures of Lapitch by Ivana Brlic Mazuranic, Zdenko Basic (animation movie Guliver), Paul Sampson (Last David Carradine’s thriller movie Night of the Templar), Kirk Harris (drama "The Kid: Chamaco”, starring Martin Sheen), Russian director Taya Zubova (drama "My Dear Fish"), Andrej Rehak (animated fantasy film "Bobo"), Romana Rozic ("What a beautiful day") and others, for whose films she composed and orchestrated music.

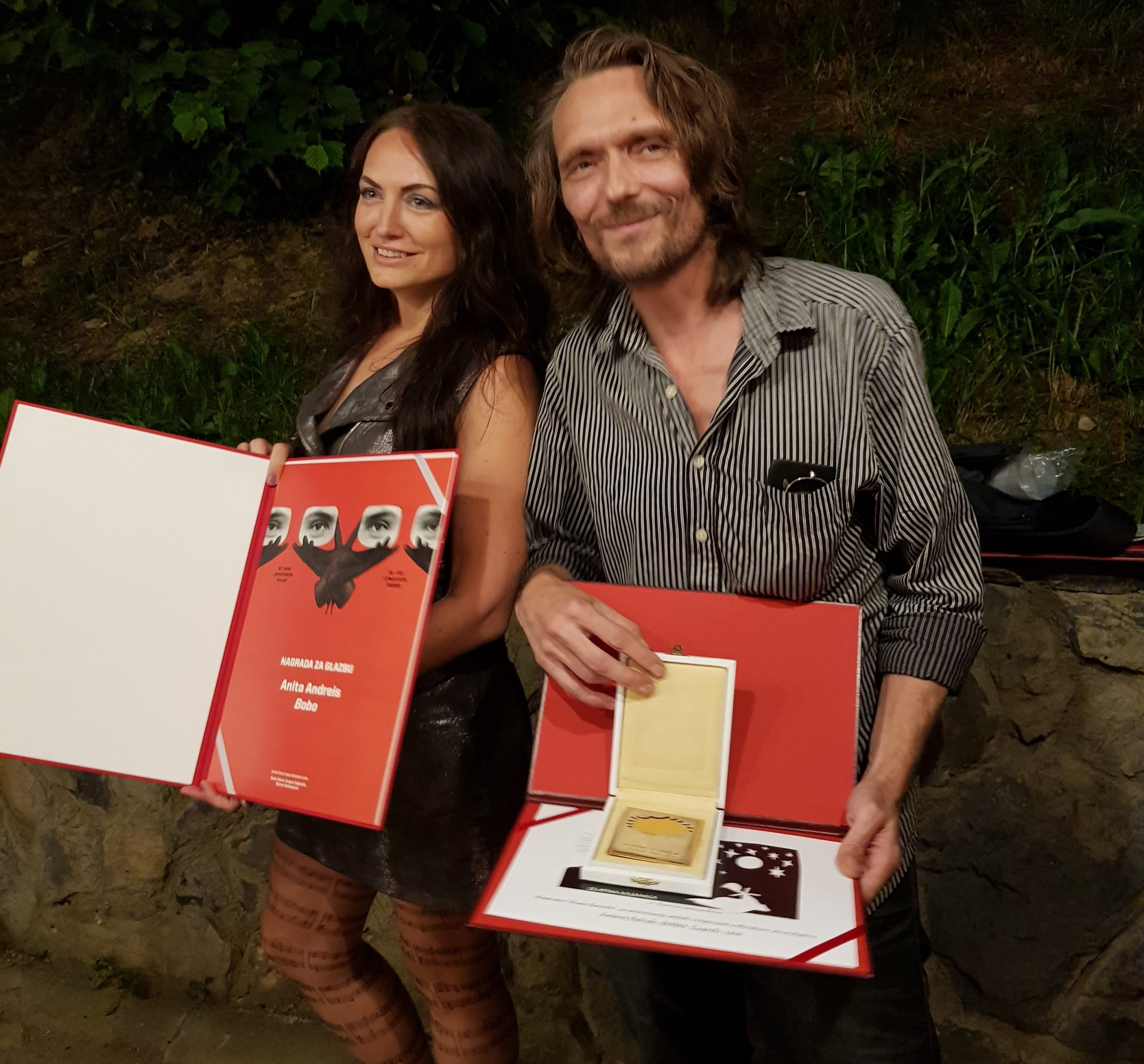
With director Andrej Rehak on 27th Days of Croatian Film Awards, June 2018

Andreis collaborated with composer Evan Evans (son of a jazz pianist Bill Evans ) as a member of Team score Composer's Collective, composed of cinematic composers dedicated to creating dramatic scores for film, television, interactive and commercial media. She is also known as a ghost composer thus much of her uncredited work remains unknown to the public.

Andreis released two soundtracks "The Brave Adventures of a Little Shoemaker (Original Motion Picture Soundtrack)" in December 2015 and "Bobo (Original Motion Picture Soundtrack)" in March 2019.

=== Ballet and theatre ===
Andreis composed music for a Croatian National Theatre in Zagreb for a ceremonial opening of its 150th season in 2010. Andreis's music was interwoven with tunes by classical composers and poetry by the Croatian poet of the 20th century Dobrisa Cesaric, for a ballet performance named "The Silence of my Murmur" by director and choreographer Leo Mujic. Croatian theatre and movie actor Dragan Despot recited poems by Dobrisa Cesaric to Andreis's music. Andreis's a cappella composition "Song of the Dead Poet" ("Pjesma Mrtvog Pjesnika" in Croatian) was performed by Australian born singer Mary Crnkovic Pilas as a lead vocal, Sandra Tribuson and Anita Andreis herself.

On a ballet show "Ghost", commissioned by the New Orleans Ballet Association and NOCA Institute, performed by Drew Jacoby, Rubinald Pronk and Prince Credell, the Anita Andreis continued her collaboration with choreographer Leo Mujic, composing music inspired by the story of an emotional metamorphosis of a Ghost. The world première of a Ghost was held in New Orleans, Louisiana and continued worldwide. The show was awarded in Belgrade, Serbia.

In Zagreb's Comedy Theatre, Andreis composed music for the show "Look Who's Back", based on a Timur Vermes’s novel: Er is wieder da. The story was adapted by director Marko Juraga and Jelena Veljaca. The comedy is a satire about a contemporary man often misled by the media. It interrogates whether a modern intellectual can break through the silence of political correctness and defeat ignorance. Croatian actor Drazen Cucek won an award of Croatian Actor Award for the main role in a show Look Who's Back. During a ceremony, while receiving an award, the actor publicly expressed his admiration of Andreis's music and her composing approach.

After Look Who's Back Andreis composed jazz noir, love, action and comic themes for the show The 39 Steps, again, in a Comedy Theatre production, directed by Marko Juraga. The 39 steps is a parody adapted from the John Buchan's 1915 novel and the 1935 film by Alfred Hitchcock. The play's concept of Patrick Barlow calls for the entirety of the 1935 adventure film The 39 Steps to be performed with a cast of only four where some of the actors perform more than 20 different roles. The script is full of references to other Alfred Hitchcock films, such as Strangers on a Train, Rear Window, Psycho and Vertigo.

=== Songwriting ===
In addition to scores and soundtracks for film, television and theatre, Andreis's musical expression interlaced into a field of alternative pop music.

Her appearance as a singer-songwriter started with her first single "Little Spring Snow Leftovers" premièred on Women of Substance podcast in 2015, and followed by singles "Clever Trick", "Your Pain is My Paint" and "Soldier", noticed both by music critics and public, claiming places at Top Lists and alternative music radio stations.

Andreis's songwriting, atypical writing style, eccentric arrangements and complex song structures has been described by reviewers as an orchestral, ambient, indie, dark pop and art rock all at the same time as well as an alternative pop-rock genre cohering with film scoring background creating her distinctive sound".

All the songs were executively written, arranged, orchestrated, recorded and produced by Anita Andreis herself. Andreis often employs and collaborates with many studio musicians, such as Tomislav Franjo Susak on bass (known as a bass player in a Croatian rock band Vatra), Nikita Nikola Jeremic on electric guitar, Ognjen Cvekic on acoustic guitar, Filip Zganec on drums and Krunoslav Maric, a member of Zagreb Soloists, on violin.

=== Nominations and awards ===
Anita Andreis won the Best Music Awards Jury Prize for her scores for animation movies Guliver in 2010. on Croatian Festival of Animation Film and two awards for score composed for the animation movie Bobo in 2018 on 27h Days of Croatian Film and Crystal Pine Award for the best original score on ISFMF (International Sound & Film Music Festival) in 2019.

She has been nominated for a Best Music Award on 61st Pula Film Festival 2014 for her score "The Brave Adventures of a little Shoemaker", where the film has got a "Golden Gate of Pula Audience Award". Andreis's composition "Monochromatic Recollections" was on a Finalist Position of Instrumental Category on UK Songwriting Contest in 2015.

== Discography ==
=== Albums ===
- 2015 – The Brave Adventures of a Little Shoemaker (Original Motion Picture Soundtrack) (music from feature movie and 4 TV miniseries), Clever Trick Music Publishing
- 2019 – Bobo (Original Motion Picture Soundtrack) (music from animation movie), Clever Trick Music Publishing
- 2019 – Chapter Three: Continuum Clever Trick Music Publishing

=== Singles ===
- 2015 – Little Spring Snow Leftovers / Anita Andreis, Clever Trick Music Publishing
- 2015 – Clever Trick / Anita Andreis, Clever Trick Music Publishing
- 2016 – Your Pain is My Paint / Anita Andreis, Clever Trick Music Publishing
- 2018 – Soldier / Anita Andreis, Clever Trick Music Publishing

== Selected works ==
=== Film and TV scores ===
- 2019 – The new audio-visual identity of the Nova TV group, new sound signature and signature theme for the most watched Croatian Television "Nova TV”
- 2019 – Dear Mrs President, documentary, director: Daniel Pavlic, Artizana
- 2018 – Bobo, animation film, director: Andrej Rehak, Zagreb Film
- 2018 – Do You Remember, animation film, director: Manuel Sumberac
- 2017 – Last War, comic book animation, director: Bruno Rodak
- 2016 – 4 TV Series: The Brave Adventures of a Little Shoemaker, feature movie, director: Silvije Petranovic, HRT
- 2015 – My Dear Fish, feature movie, director: Taya Zubova, SL Studio
- 2013 – Segrt Hlapic (The Brave Adventures of a Little Shoemaker), feature movie, director: Silvije Petranovic, Maydi Film
- 2012 – Night of The Templar, feature film, director: Paul Sampson
- 2011 – Fragments, short film, director: Matija Radeljak, Aning Film
- 2011 – Such a Beautiful Day, short film, director: Romana Rozic, Croatian Film Union
- 2009 – Life in Print, animation film, director: Bartley Taylor
- 2009 – The Kid: Chamaco, feature film, director: Miquel Necoechea, Kirk Harris
- 2009 – Zagreb Stories, feature film, directors: Nebojsa Slijepcevic, Igor Mirkovic, Propeller Film
- 2009 – Guliver, animation film, director: Zdenko Basic, Infine
- 2006 – Snow Story, animation film, director: Zdenko Basic, Infine

=== Music for ballet & theatre ===
- 2018 – The 39 Steps, comedy theatre show, director: Marko Juraga, Comedy Theater in Zagreb
- 2018 – Look Who’s Back, satirical theatre show, director: Marko Juraga, Comedy Theater in Zagreb
- 2011 – Ghost, ballet show, director: Leo Mujic, New Orleans Ballet Organisation
- 2010 – The Silence of my Murmur, ballet show, director: Leo Mujic, Croatian National Theater

=== Compositions ===
- Saviour for full orchestra (2009)
- Song of a Dead Poet a cappella (2010)
- Ghost for strings quartet (2010)
- Tale of a life long gone for piano (2012)
- The Gravity of Unwanted Thoughts for piano (2013)
- Monochromatic Recollections for piano and orchestra (2013)
- Look Who’s Back: Main Theme for strings quartet (2018)
- The 39 Steps: Decomposed Village Brass Quintet Theme for brass quintet (2018)
- The 39 Steps: Main Theme for jazz orchestra (2018)
- Bobo: Mountains for full orchestra (2018)

== Organisations ==
- Croatian Composers' Society (HDS)
- American Society of Composers, Authors and Publishers (ASCAP),
- Screen Composers Guild of New Zealand
- Women in Film and TV (WIFT).
- Mentor Collective (as a mentor for Berklee College of Music Online Students)
