= Sunčana Škrinjarić =

Croatian children's writer

- Born: 11 December 1931; Zagreb, Kingdom of Yugoslavia
- Died: 21 April 2004 (aged 72); Zagreb, Croatia
- Writing career
- Language: Croatian
- Subject: Children's literature
- Notable awards: Grigor Vitez Literary Prize (1970, 1978, 1983) "Ivana Brlić Mazuranic" award (1981)

Sunčana Škrinjarić (11 December 1931 – 21 April 2004) was a Croatian writer, poet and journalist. She became known by writing children's books, such as Kaktus bajke, Pisac i vrijeme, Slikar u šumi, Pisac i princeza, Ulica predaka and Kazališna kavana.

Skrinjarić won the Grigor Vitez Literary Prize in 1970, 1978 and 1983 and the "Ivana Brlić Mazuranic" award in 1981. She was nominated for the Hans Christian Andersen Award in 1999. Her works were adapted into two feature animated films: The Elm-Chanted Forest (1986) and The Magician's Hat (1990), directed by Milan Blažeković.
