= Dnevnik velikog Perice =

- Genre: Comedy
- Based on: One Song a Day Takes Mischief Away by; Krešo Golik; Ivo Škrabalo; Iz dnevnika maloga Perice by Vjekoslav Majer
- Country of origin: Croatia
- Original language: Croatian
- No. of seasons: 2
- No. of episodes: 12

Production
- Running time: 50 minutes

Original release
- Network: HRT 1
- Release: 8 March 2021 – present

Related
- One Song a Day Takes Mischief Away

Dnevnik velikog Perice (Croatian for 'The Diary of Big Perica') is a Croatian comedy television series that serves as a sequel to the 1970 film One Song a Day Takes Mischief Away. Taking place in 1964, about thirty years after the events of the movie, the series follows the titular character, Perica Šafranek (Živko Anočić), and his family.

The series premiered on 8 March 2021 on HRT 1, with the second season following on 2 December 2024.

== Cast ==
- Živko Anočić as Perica Šafranek
- Mirjana Bohanec Vidović as Ana Šafranek
- Csilla Barath Bastaić as Željka Šafranek Kostanjšek, Perica's wife
- Dušan Bućan as Josip Žnidaršič - Žnida, Perica's best friend
- Iva Babić as Nada Žegar-Šafranek, Music class teacher
- Nikola Kojo as Žegar
- Rade Šerbedžija as Eduard Eddy Füller (season 2)
- Branko Pjer Meničanin as Matić
- Goran Navojec as Karlo Bulić
- Lana Ujević Telenta as Mila Majher (season 2)
- Lana Meniga as Zdenka (season 2)
- Bernard Tomić as Vlado (season 2)
- Otokar Levaj as Eugen Fulir (season 2)

== Series overview ==
Season	Episodes	Originally released	
Season	Episodes	First released	Last released
1	6	8 March 2021	12 April 2021
2	6	2 December 2024	17 December 2024

== See also ==
- One Song a Day Takes Mischief Away
