= The Asia Foundation =

US-based non-profit organization

- Formation: 1954
- Type: Nonprofit organization
- Headquarters: San Francisco, California, United States
- President and CEO: Laurel Miller
- Revenue: $104,324,731 (2019)
- Expenses: $104,757,151 (2019)
- Website: asiafoundation.org

The Asia Foundation (TAF) is a nonprofit international development organization with programs across Asia. Its programs operate in various sectors, including governance, women's empowerment and gender equality, inclusive economic growth, environmental and climate action, and regional and international cooperation. One of the Foundation's initiatives is the "Let's Read" program, which provides a free digital library in local languages in over 20 countries. The Asia Foundation is headquartered in San Francisco, California, and operates as a 501(c)(3) nonprofit organization. It collaborates with public and private partners and receives funding from various sources, including agencies, foundations, corporations, and individual donors. The Foundation was established in 1954 by the Central Intelligence Agency (CIA) to conduct activities on behalf of the United States government in ways that were not available to official U.S. agencies.

== Global presence ==
The Asia Foundation operates at both country and regional levels through its offices in the Asia-Pacific region. The Foundation's staff work on development challenges specific to each location. In addition to its offices in Asia, the organization maintains offices in San Francisco, California, and Washington, D.C.

== History ==
"The Asia Foundation (TAF), a Central Intelligence Agency proprietary, was established in 1954 to undertake cultural and educational activities on behalf of the United States Government in ways not open to official U.S. agencies." The Asia Foundation is an outgrowth of the Committee for a Free Asia, which was founded by the United States National Security Council in 1951. CIA funding and support of the Committee for a Free Asia, the Asia Foundation, and Radio Free Asia (not to be confused with the current Radio Free Asia) were assigned the CIA code name "Project DTPILLAR".

In 1954, the Committee for a Free Asia was renamed the Asia Foundation (TAF) and incorporated in California as a private, nominally non-governmental covert propaganda organization devoted to promoting democracy, rule of law, and market-based development in post-war Asia. As Price (2024) puts it: "DIPILLAR’s pro-capitalism mission was not just a pro-American propaganda mission. It was part of larger CIA operations rejecting Asians' rights to choose their own political and economic systems freely."

Among the original founding officers of the board were presidents/chairmen of corporations including T.S. Peterson, CEO of Standard Oil of California (now Chevron), Brayton Wilbur, president of Wilbur-Ellis Co., and J.D. Zellerbach, chairman of the Crown Zellerbach Corporation; four university presidents including Grayson Kirk from Columbia, J.E. Wallace Sterling of Stanford, and Raymond Allen from UCLA; prominent attorneys including Turner McBaine and A. Crawford Greene; Pulitzer Prize-winning writer James Michener; Paul Hoffman, the first administrator of the Marshall Plan in Europe; and several major figures in foreign affairs.

In 1966, Ramparts revealed that the CIA was covertly funding a number of organizations, including the Asia Foundation, which were entangled in conflicts with international pro-Communist groups. A commission authorized by President Johnson and led by Secretary of State Rusk determined that the Asia Foundation should be preserved and overtly funded by the US government. Following this change, The Asia Foundation was classified as a private, nonprofit, nongovernmental organization under the section 501(c)(3) of the Internal Revenue Code. The foundation began to restructure its programming, shifting away from its earlier goals of "building democratic institutions and encouraging the development of democratic leadership" toward an emphasis on Asian development as a whole (CRS 1983).

On 1 February 2023, Laurel E. Miller took over as president of the Foundation. She previously directed the Asia program at the International Crisis Group.
