= Emil Glad =

Croatian actor (1929-2009)

- Born: Emil Glad; 25 June 1929; Nova Kapela, Croatia
- Died: 28 August 2009 (aged 80)
- Occupation: actor
- Spouse: Ružica Glad (1975–2009) - his death

Emil Glad (25 June 1929 – 28 August 2009) was a Croatian actor. Glad was a member of Gavella Drama Theatre, from its foundation in 1954 until his retirement in 1994. His film credits include Lapitch the Little Shoemaker and The Magician's Hat.

== Filmography ==
=== Film roles ===
Film
| Year | Title | Role | Notes |
|---|---|---|---|
| 1960 | Oko božje | | |
| 1960 | Ženidba | | |
| 1961 | The Emperor's New Clothes | | |
| 1963 | Arina | | |
| 1965 | Srećan slučaj | | |
| 1967 | Četvrti suputnik | | |
| 1967 | Breza | priest | |
| 1970 | Overnjonski senatori | | |
| 1974 | Nož | | |
| 1975 | Seljačka buna 1573 | | |
| 1978 | Karmine | | |
| 1978 | Tomo Bakran | | |
| 1979 | Novinar | | |
| 1979 | Čovjek koga treba ubiti | | |
| 1981 | Puška u cik zore | | |
| 1981 | Kraljevo | | |
| 1982 | Tamburaši | Mata | |
| 1984 | Evo ti ga, mister Flips | | |
| 1985 | Horvatov izbor | | |
| 1986 | The Elm-Chanted Forest | Mate | Voice |
| 1987 | Krizantema | | |
| 1988 | Kad ftičeki popevleju | | |
| 1988 | Glembajevi | | |
| 1989 | Čovjek koji je volio sprovode | | |
| 1990 | Doktorova noć | priest | |
| 1990 | The Magician's Hat | Mate | Voice |
| 1992 | Papa Siksto V. | | |
| 1993 | Zlatne godine | | |
| 1993 | Narodni mučenik | | |
| 1995 | Isprani | | |
| 1995 | Posebna vožnja | | |
| 1996 | Prepoznavanje | | |
| 1997 | Rusko meso | | |
| 1997 | Treća žena | | |
| 1997 | The Makers | | |
| 1997 | Kvartet | | |
| 1997 | Lapitch the Little Shoemaker | Bear | Voice |
| 2004 | Sorry for Kung Fu | old, sick men | |

=== Television roles ===
Film
| Year | Title | Role | Notes |
|---|---|---|---|
| 1970 | Naše malo misto | Kolumbo | |
| 1971 | Kuda idu divlje svinje | a men from caffe bar | |
| 1975 | Vrijeme ratno i poratno | | |
| 1977 | Nikola Tesla | | |
| 1979 | Anno domini 1573 | | |
| 1980 | Punom parom | translator | |
| 1982 | Nepokoreni grad | | |
| 1983 | Rade Končar | | |
| 1983 | Kiklop | | |
| 1983-1997 | Smogovci | Flek Kontrec | |
| 1986 | Putovanje u vučjak | Slavek | |
| 1989 | Ptice nebeske | | |
| 1990-1991 | Mali Leteći Medvjedići | Platon | |
| 2000-2002 | Naši i vaši | Franjo "Franc" Smolek | |
