= Vatroslav Brlić =

Croatian politician and lawyer (1862–1923)

- Born: 25 July 1862; Brod na Savi, Slavonian Military Frontier, Austrian Empire (now Croatia)
- Died: 6 August 1923 (aged 61); Brod na Savi, Kingdom of Serbs, Croats and Slovenes
- Education: University of Vienna; University of Zagreb
- Occupations: Politician and lawyer
- Political party: Party of Rights; Croat-Serb Coalition; Democratic Party

Vatroslav Brlić (25 July 1862 – 6 August 1923) was a Croatian politician and lawyer.

== Biography ==
Brlić was born in Brod na Savi to politician, lawyer and publicist Andrija Torkvat Brlić and artist Francisca Daubachy. During his high-school education in Požega and Osijek, Brlić befriended August Harambašić who introduced him to political activism of the Party of Rights. Brlić studied law at the University of Vienna and the University of Zagreb. In 1892, Brlić opened a law office in his home town and married writer Ivana Brlić-Mažuranić. The marriage linked Brlić with Mažuranićs, one of the most prominent Croatian families at the time. Subsequently, Brlić established personal contacts with leading Croatia's politicians of the period such as Ante Starčević, Fran Folnegović, Josip Juraj Strossmayer, Frano Supilo and Svetozar Pribićević.. In 1894, at a Brlić's initiative, the Posavska Hrvatska was established in Brod na Savi, as the first Party of Rights newspaper in Slavonia. In 1906 election, Brlić won a seat in the Croatian Sabor as a Croat-Serb Coalition candidate. The following year, Brlić started publication of the Materinska rieč newspaper. In 1918, in the process of dissolution of Austria-Hungary and creation of Yugoslavia, Brlić was elected the president of the National Council of Slovenes, Croats and Serbs in Brod na Savi. In that capacity, Brlić accepted surrender of generaloberst Stjepan Sarkotić, the final Austro-Hungarian governor of Bosnia and Herzegovina at the end of the First World War. In 1919, Brlić joined the Democratic Party and started the Brodske novine newspaper.

== Sources ==
- Artuković, Mato (2002). ""Posavska Hrvatska" o Brodu krajem 19. stoljeća" [Posavska Hrvatska on Brod in Late 19th Century]. Scrinia Slavonica: Annual of the Department for the History of Slavonia, Srijem and Baranja of the Croatian Institute of History (in Croatian). 2 (1). Slavonski Brod: Hrvatski institut za povijest - Podružnica za povijest Slavonije, Srijema i Baranje: 46–74. ISSN 1332-4853.
- Artuković, Mato (2006). "Arhiv obitelji Brlić u Slavonskom Brodu" [The Archive of the Brlić Family]. Muzeologija (in Croatian) (43/44). Zagreb: Muzejski dokumentacijski centar: 211–225. ISSN 0353-7552.
- Bešlić, Uršula (2024). "Darovano nasljeđe Ivane Brlić-Mažuranić Muzeju Brodskog Posavlja" [The Legacy of Ivana Brlić-Mažuranić Donated to the Museum of Brodsko Posavlje]. Informatica museologica (in Croatian) (55). Zagreb: Muzejski dokumentacijski centar: 49–56. ISSN 0350-2325.
- Stipčević-Despotović, Anđelka (1989). "Brlić, Vatroslav". Croatian Biographical Lexicon (in Croatian). Miroslav Krleža Institute of Lexicography.
