= Andrija Torkvat Brlić =

Croatian publicist, politician and grammarian

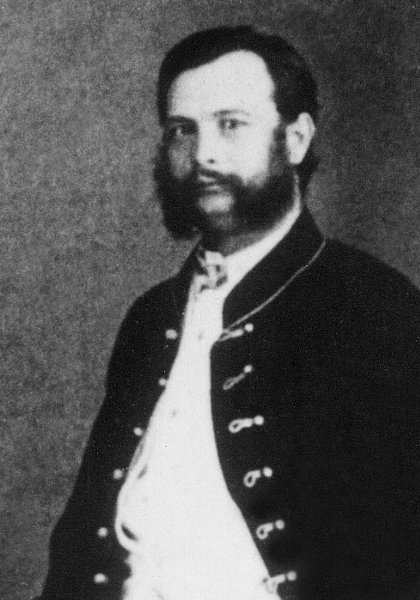
- Born: May 15, 1826; Brod na Savi, Slavonian Military Frontier, Austrian Empire
- Died: May 21, 1868 (aged 42); Brod na Savi, Slavonian Military Frontier, Austria-Hungary
- Relatives: Vatroslav Brlić (son)

Andrija Torkvat Brlić (15 May 1826 – 21 May 1868) was a Croatian writer, linguist, politician and lawyer. A follower of the Illyrian movement, Brlić was a prominent advocate of the unification of the South Slavs in the 19th century.

== Biography ==
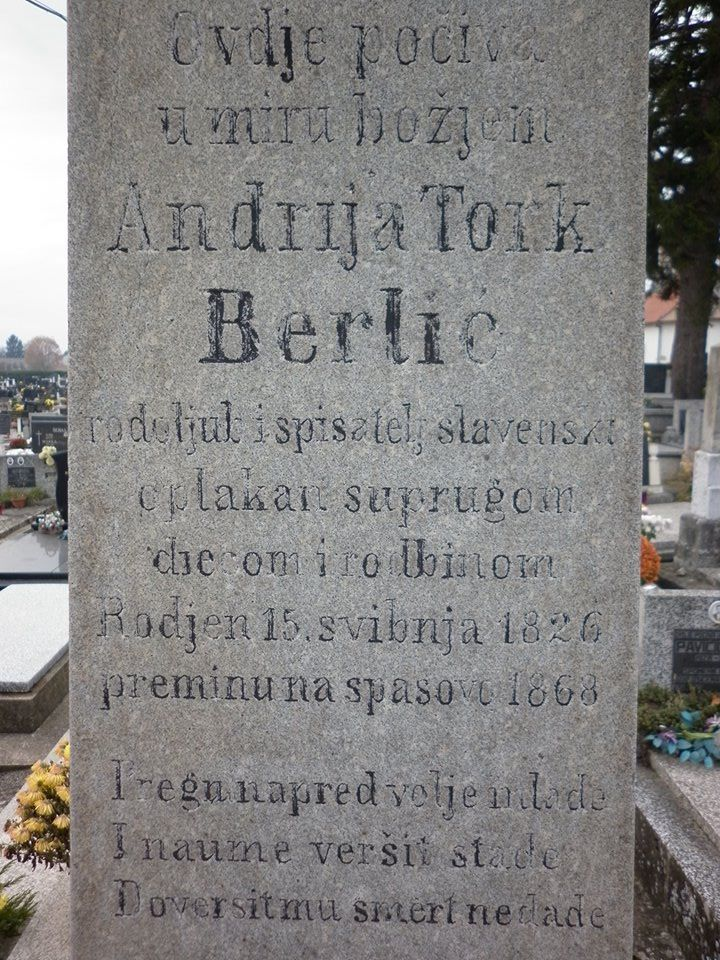
Tomb of Andrija Torkvat Brlić

Andrija Torkvat Brlić was born on 15 May 1826 in Brod na Savi, then part of the Austrian Empire. His mother, Katarina (née Benko) hailed from Vukovar while his father, Ignjat Alojzij Brlić, was a merchant, linguist, publicist, and translator. (Note: He was a descendant of the Ragusan Brlić family. There is a tradition of considering them a Herzegovina family, with a mention of a Zahumlje prince named Brlić in 1393, and it's reasonable to assume this family would be their descendants, but the historical sources for them start in the early 18th century in the village of Svinjar (today's Davor).) Ignjat Alojzije Brlić was a noted participant of the Illyrian movement himself, his 'Illyrian' grammar first published in 1833 being one of the first Croatian grammar books, even as he disagreed with the likes of Ljudevit Gaj, arguing that his ikavian dialect should be a literary language.

Andrija Torkvat Brlić attended elementary school (lower gymnasium) in Vinkovci, and his father sent him to a Zagreb seminary in 1841. He soon dropped out and moved out to a Jesuit convent in Zagreb, from where he continued to attend higher gymnasium, but continued to rebel against his father by refusing to attend Hungarian classes. In March 1842, together with nine other students, he founded a Čitaonica Narodna (lit. 'people's reading room') in Zagreb, and became its first president. In 1843, with the help of a scholarship provided by bishop Haulik, he went to study theology in Vienna at the Pázmáneum.

In 1847, he spent a summer in Glina where he befriended Josip Jelačić, and then also moved to the Vienna Augustineum where his friend Josip Juraj Strossmayer had been one of the people in charge. During his studies, he took an interest in politics and became a follower of the Illyrian movement. At the time, Brlić collaborated with Jernej Kopitar, Franc Miklošič, Fran Kurelac and Strossmayer. He also wrote poems and articles for the literary magazine Zora dalmatinska. In the 1840s, he contributed to a number of newspapers and magazines, including the Narodne novine, and Danica ilirska.

He took part in the Prague Slavic Congress of 1848 and later that year joined Josip Jelačić's campaign against Hungary. He worked as his correspondent, contacting the leaders of the Czech national movement. In the winter of 1848/49, he traveled to Paris as the envoy of Ban Jelačić, and was granted an audience by Louis Napoleon and Édouard Drouyn de Lhuys. In France, he published articles in the Journal des débats and La Tribune des Peuples informing the French public about Jelačić's campaign, advocating the idea of a broad federalist restructuring of the Habsburg monarchy. He collaborated with Polish refugees led by Adam Czartoryski, as well as a number of French Slavophiles such as Paul-Charles-Amable de Bourgoing and Adolphe Billecocq, and other people from Serbia, Romania and Czechia.

On his return home, he was made a secretary in the government of the Virovitica County in Osijek in the summer of 1849. Later that year he traveled to Vienna, Dresden and Prague. Jelačić and Brlić began to distance themselves from one another because Brlić advocated against Schwarzenberg, putting him at odds with the Imperial Court, and because Brlić was publicly accused of leaking Jelačić's memorandum to the Emperor about the legal status of Croatia and Vojvodina to the Belgrade newspaper Srpske novine. The Bishop of Đakovo Josip Juraj Strossmayer would support a second diplomatic engagement for Brlić in Paris, which also allowed him to travel to other European cities. He spent some time in London, and visited a number of other capital cities. From 1850 to 1851, he was the secretary of the Matica ilirska, and the manager of the estate of Bishop Strossmayer in Đakovo. Afterwards, he went to study Law in Vienna, completing his education 1857 before opening his own practice in Brod na Savi.

Brlić collaborated in periodicals, was editor of Kolo magazine, and translated and edited the works of older Croatian writers.

In 1861 he was an active participant in the Croatian Parliament, working as a delegate for the Military Frontier and leading its representatives to the emperor, championing for the unification of the border area with Croatia and Slavonia. That year, representing Brod in the Parliament, Brlić supported the recognition and equality of the Croatian and Serbian peoples in Slavonia, and the choice of the name "Yugoslav" for the people's language. Much unlike the Kingdom of Croatia, the population of Slavonia at the time included 38% of Serbs. Over the following few years, Brlić occasionally came in conflict with other Croatian politicians because he not only supported Yugoslavism, but also insisted on maintaining a Slavonian regional identity, and vocally advocated against referring to the Triune Kingdom under only the Croatian name.

Brlić first reached out to Serbian politician Ilija Garašanin from Paris in 1849, after the Jelačić government stopped funding him. During the 1860s, he worked closely with the entourage of Garašanin. It is believed he was part of the Serbian intelligence network because of the existence of encrypted communication between him and Antonijo Orešković, but the extent and purpose of his involvement in the intelligence network remains unclear. It is apparent that Brlić was included in the radical plans of Strossmayer and Garašanin to create a common state of South Slavs that were under Austria and Turkey at the time.

He was one of the most prominent advocates of unficiation of South Slavs in the 19th century.

Brlić was a follower of the Serbian linguist Vuk Karadžić, and his grammatical theories combined the Karadžić and Illyrian philological models, following in the steps of his father's work, Karadžić, Đuro Daničić, Franc Miklošič and Vjekoslav Babukić.

Brlić was married to painter Francisca Daubachy. They had a summer house in Brodsko Brdo. Together, they had two sons including Vatroslav.

He was a polyglot and spoke German, French, Polish, Czech, Russian, Slovak, and English. He translated from Greek, Czech and German.

He died on 21 May 1868, six days after his 42nd birthday. He left behind a number of written correspondences with politicians he had between 1840 and 1857. His diary from this period is considered his most important work, because of his insights as Jelačić's secretary and envoy.

== Works ==
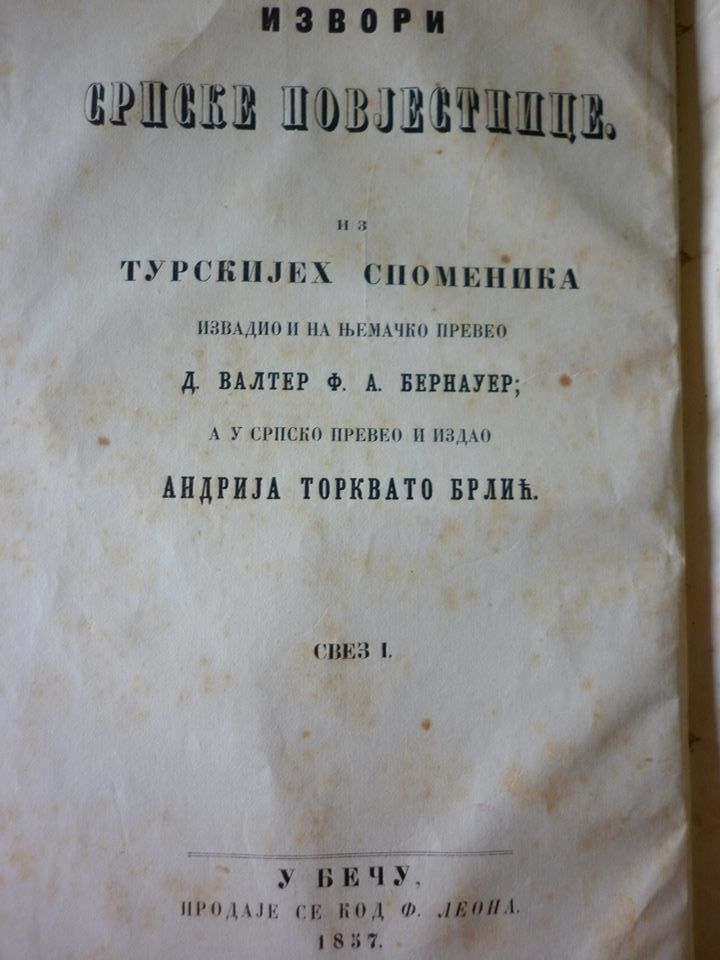
Sources of Serbian history

As a law student in Vienna, he published two historiographical books and one on the grammar of the 'Illyrian' language:

- Die freiwillige Theilnahme der Serben und Kroaten an der vier letztenösterreichisch-türkischen Kriegen [The voluntary participation of the Serbs and Croats at the last four Austro-Turkish wars] (1854)
- Grammatik der Iliyrischen Sprache [Grammar of the Illyrian language] (1854)
- Izvori srpske povjesnice iz turskijeh spomenika [Sources of Serbian history from Turkish monuments] (1857)

== Sources ==
- Šabić, Marijan (2012). "Biografija Andrije Torkvata Brlića". In Župan, Dinko (ed.). Zbornik o Andriji Torkvatu Brliću. Radovi znanstveno-stručnog skupa (in Croatian). Hrvatski institut za povijest – Podružnica za povijest Slavonije, Srijema i Baranje. pp. 237–247. ISBN 978-953-6659-72-2.
- Artuković, Mato (2012). "Dnevnik Andrije Torkvata Brlića kao povijesni izvor". Zbornik o Andriji Torkvatu Brliću. Slavonski Brod: Hrvatski institut za povijest. ISBN 978-953-6659-72-2.
- Artuković, Mato (2006). "Arhiv obitelji Brlić u Slavonskom Brodu" [The archive of the Brlić family]. Muzeologija (43/44). Zagreb: Museum Documentation Centre: 211–225. ISSN 0353-7552.
- Tomljanović, Dora (2024). "Fenomen nacionalne indiferentnosti u okviru Slavonije na Gospodarskoj izložbi 1864" [The Phenomenon of National Indifference in Slavonia at the Economic Exhibition in 1864]. Scrinia Slavonica (in Croatian). 24 (1): 49–76. doi:10.22586/ss.24.1.1.
- Švab, Mladen (1989). "BRLIĆ, Andrija Torkvat". Croatian Biographical Lexicon (in Croatian).
