= The Brave Adventures of a Little Shoemaker =

- Movie poster
- Croatian: Šegrt Hlapić
- Directed by: Silvije Petranović
- Written by: Silvije Petranović
- Based on: The Brave Adventures of Lapitch by Ivana Brlić-Mažuranić
- Produced by: Maydi Petranović
- Starring: Mile Biljanović; Goran Navojec; Hristina Popović
- Cinematography: Mirko Pivčević
- Edited by: Andrija Zafranovic
- Music by: Anita Andreis
- Distributed by: Maydi Film and Video
- Release date: 7 November 2013
- Running time: 102 minutes
- Country: Croatia
- Language: Croatian

The Brave Adventures of a Little Shoemaker (Croatian: Šegrt Hlapić) is a 2013 film directed by Silvije Petranović. It is based on the book The Brave Adventures of Lapitch by Ivana Brlić-Mažuranić. In just 18 days after the opening, it became the most-watched Croatian children's fiction film.

== Cast ==
- Mile Biljanović as Lapitch
- Ena Lulić as Gita
- Goran Navojec as Master
- Hristina Popović as Mistress
- Milan Pleština as the Black Man
- Livio Badurina as the Circus Master
- Mustafa Nadarević as the Good Basketman
- Nikola Kojo as the Rich Basketman
- Špiro Guberina as the Old Milkman

== Original music score ==
The original motion picture soundtrack, The Brave Adventures of a Little Shoemaker (Original Motion Picture Soundtrack), was composed by Croatian composer Anita Andreis and released on 31 December 2015.

== Nominations and awards ==
- Lucas - International Festival of Films for Children and Young People 2014 Nominated Lucas Best Film Silvije Petranovic
- Pula Film Festival 2015 Won Audience Award "Golden Gate Pula" Silvije Petranovic
