= The Wisdom of Crocodiles =

- Film poster
- Directed by: Po-Chih Leong
- Written by: Paul Hoffman
- Produced by: Carolyn Choa; David Lascelles
- Starring: Jude Law; Elina Löwensohn; Timothy Spall; Kerry Fox; Jack Davenport; Colin Salmon
- Cinematography: Oliver Curtis
- Edited by: Robin Sales
- Music by: Orlando Gough; John Lunn
- Production companies: Goldwyn Films International; Film Foundry Partners; Entertainment Film Distributors; Zenith Productions; Arts Council of England
- Distributed by: Entertainment Film Distributors
- Release date: November 27, 1998
- Running time: 99 minutes
- Country: United Kingdom
- Language: English
- Budget: $5 million

The Wisdom of Crocodiles (also released as Immortality) is a 1998 British romantic thriller film directed by Po-Chih Leong and starring Jude Law.

== Plot ==
Steven Grlscz, a charming, intelligent and reclusive vampire, selects single women as targets for his feedings. Steven can only feed on victims who fully feel love for him, as blood alone isn't enough; to this end he thoroughly researches each woman, and then manipulates her into falling in love before feeding on and killing her. Afterwards Steven is forced to expel slender, intricate crystals (physical forms of a person's dominant emotion) from his body if the love she felt was overshadowed by another emotion, such as despair or disappointment. The pain of doing so is akin to passing kidney stones, and thus Steven seeks a perfect lover in order to prevent this.

After Steve watches police officers remove the body of one of his former lovers from a tree, he happens upon another woman, Maria Vaughan, in the Waterloo Station of the London Underground. He prevents Maria from committing suicide and begins dating her. This results in Maria falling for Steve. He eventually proposes to her, but immediately afterwards Steve entices Maria to his bedroom, where he drains her blood.

After disposing of the body of Maria, Steven is seen by a passerby, who notices his van and later mentions this to the police. Maria's corpse is found after being netted by an illegal fishing boat, prompting Steven to call the police. Two detectives come to question him and his relationship to the victim, and while he appears innocent enough, lead Inspector Healey is immediately suspicious of Steven.

While visiting a nearby factory, Steven notices another potential target: an engineer named Anne Levels. Anne's independence and quirky charm intrigue Steven, who asks her out. The two begin a relationship, although Anne is quick to note Steven's mysterious nature.

Inspector Healey and Sergeant Roche continue to trail Steven as their prime suspect. Following Steven and Anne after a dinner date, Healey is attacked by a small gang in the Underground. The gang's leader takes Healey's crucifix, a gift from his wife, but Steven appears and manages to talk the gang into letting Healey go unharmed. Still wary of his suspect, Healey is nevertheless grateful to Steven for his help.

The relationship between Steven and Anne progresses, but Steven soon notices that his healing abilities are starting to weaken, with a small cut continuing to bleed for days. Meanwhile, Healey is able to obtain a photograph of the van's driver, but a glare prevents anyone from clearly seeing Steven's face. Still, Steven is called in for a police line-up, with a toll operator Steven had earlier encountered acting as an eyewitness. The witness cannot remember who he had seen due to seeing hundreds of people that day, to the disbelief of the police; there is an implication that Steven might have had something to do with this memory lapse, as it is revealed that he can see through the one-way glass concealing the toll operator and inspectors.

Anne and Steven are later attacked by the gang from the Underground, who demand Anne in exchange for Steven to be let go. Steven goes with the gang members, but after getting enough distance Steven overpowers them and saves Anne from being assaulted. The couple spends the night together, and Steven finds himself genuinely falling in love with Anne. The pair converse about a psychological concept: the notion that people have three minds (the human mind, the mammalian mind and the reptilian mind, with the lattermost representing primal or survival instincts). The movie's title comes from this conversation, during which Anne, sharing a childhood incident with Steve, asks him whether her actions were driven by the "horse"/mammalian mind or the "crocodile"/reptilian mind.

Steven is met at work by Healey, who informs him that he is no longer a suspect in the murder of Maria, though the inspector personally remains unconvinced of Steven's supposed innocence. Steven and Healey share their philosophies about good and evil, and before parting ways Steven returns Healey's crucifix, which he had taken back from the gang.

After this, Steven is called by Anne, who insists that she come to his apartment to see him. When she arrives, Steven attempts to drink from her as he did Maria but finds himself unable to go through with it. He finally reveals the truth to a horrified Anne, who tries to run from him. He confesses to her that he loves her and does not wish to kill her. Steven informs Anne that, due to not having fed on the blood of a lover, he is slowly dying; even a small wound would kill him within twenty minutes from blood hemorrhage. Despite the danger and knowledge that he has murdered others, Anne decides to stay and look after him.

Steven's body is ultimately driven to near-death by his hunger. He informs Anne that he has run out of bandages, and she offers to go buy some. She returns early and sees Steven preparing to finally kill her. He chases Anne to the roof, and though she claims to no longer love him, Steven states that even if there's no more love in her heart, it's still in her blood, which would suffice. Rather than be fed on by Steven, Anne leaps off the roof. Steven is able to grab her arm in time, but she uses a metal chopstick (doubling as a hair stick and Anne's "lucky charm") to stab his hand. Steven screams in agony but manages to hold on and pull Anne to safety.

She departs, shaken, as the mortally wounded Steven retreats to his apartment study, reminiscing as he finally dies, with the sketches of all the women he had targeted over the centuries surrounding him.

== Cast ==
- Jude Law as Steven Grlscz

Grlscz's women

- Elina Löwensohn as Anne Levels
- Kerry Fox as Maria Vaughan

Police

- Timothy Spall as Inspector Healey
- Jack Davenport as Sergeant Roche

Gang

- Ashley Artus as Gang Leader
- Tom Wu as Gang Member
- Hon Ping Tang as Gang Member
- Antony Cotton as Gang Member
- Richard Mylan as Gang Member
- Carlton Headley as Gang Member
- Neran Persaud as Gang Member

Supporting cast

- Julia Davies as Girl In Operating Theatre
- Carlton Jarvis as Physician (uncredited)
- Colin Salmon as Martin
- Hitler Wong as "Noodles" Chan
- Stuart Bowman as Car Crash Mechanic
- C.J. December as Car Crash Mechanic
- Anastasia Hille as Karen
- Nicholas Lamont (as Nick Lamont) as Toll Bridge Attendant
- Joseph O'Conor as Mr. Nancarrow
- Rupert Farley as Priest
- Diane Howse as Mrs. Healey
- Cliff Parisi as Labourer
- Vincent Keane as Injured Workman

== Reception ==
Rotten Tomatoes gave the film a total score of 47% based on 19 reviews. The website's critics consensus called it "stylish, but emotionally uninvolving". Metacritic gave it 58% based on reviews from 11 critics.

Richard Corliss of Time liked the film, claiming "... this cool, handsome thriller proceeds with an elliptical elegance". Others, were not as kind; Elvis Mitchell of Rolling Stone dismissed it as "bloodless", with dialogue that "sounds like the kind of florid pick-up lines better used on second-year literature students or the kind of lonely women seen only in movies", while Paul Tatara of CNN called it "stylish but anemic".

The film won the 1999 Grand Prize of European Fantasy Film in Silver at the Brussels International Festival of Fantasy Film.

== See also ==
- Vampire film
