= Mažuranić =

Mažuranić is a Croatian surname. The surname may refer to:

- Antun Mažuranić (1805–1888), Croatian writer and linguist
- Ivan Mažuranić (1814–1890), Croatian poet, linguist and politician
- Ivana Brlić-Mažuranić (1874–1938), Croatian writer for children
- Matija Mažuranić (1817–1881), Croatian writer
- Vladimir Mažuranić (1845–1928), Croatian lawyer and politician
- Vladimir Fran Mažuranić (1859–1928), Croatian writer
- Vlado Mažuranić (1915–1985), Yugoslav fencer
