= One Song a Day Takes Mischief Away =

1970 film by Krešo Golik

- Croatian: Tko pjeva zlo ne misli
- Directed by: Krešo Golik
- Screenplay by: Krešo Golik; Ivo Škrabalo
- Based on: Iz dnevnika maloga Perice by Vjekoslav Majer
- Starring: Franjo Majetić; Mirjana Bohanec; Relja Bašić; Mia Oremović; Tomislav Žganec
- Cinematography: Ivica Rajković
- Edited by: Katja Majer
- Music by: Živan Cvitković
- Release date: 1970
- Running time: 85 minutes
- Country: Yugoslavia
- Language: Croatian

One Song a Day Takes Mischief Away (Croatian: Tko pjeva zlo ne misli) is a 1970 Croatian comedy-drama film. Directed by Krešo Golik and based on a novella by Vjekoslav Majer, the film achieved considerable critical and commercial success at the time of its release. In 1999, a poll of Croatian film critics found it to be the best Croatian film ever made.

Set in 1935 in Zagreb, the story is seen through the eyes of six-year-old Perica Šafranek (played by Tomislav Žganec). A dandy from Zagreb, Mr Fulir (played by Relja Bašić), starts flirting with Perica's mother during a family picnic. At first, Perica's father does not notice anything and invites Fulir to their residence. Perica's father wants to marry off Perica's aunt to Fulir, pairing them because Fulir is a good man and she is rich. After multiple rendezvous, he becomes aware of Fulir's attempts to seduce his wife.

A television sequel series titled Dnevnik velikog Perice, which follows Perica Šafranek (portrayed by Živko Anočić) about thirty years after the events of the film, premiered on HRT 1 on 8 March 2021.

== See also ==
- Dnevnik velikog Perice
- List of Croatian films
