= The Magician's Hat (film) =

- Directed by: Milan Blažeković
- Written by: Fred Sharkey; Ivo Škrabalo; Sunčana Škrinjarić
- Produced by: Vlado Terešak
- Starring: Dragan Milivojević; Emil Glad; Ivo Rogulja; Ratko Glavina
- Production company: Croatia Film
- Release date: August 19, 1990
- Country: Yugoslavia
- Language: Croatian

The Magician's Hat (Čarobnjakov šešir) is a 1990 animated film produced by the Croatia Film company and directed by Milan Blažeković. It is the sequel to 1986's The Elm-Chanted Forest.

== Story ==
Thistle the magician teams up with his animal friends, along with some fairies and a volcano-dwelling dragon, to rescue their forest from the wrath of the Ice Emperor Frostkill (Car Mrazomor) and his army of icy ghost witches.

== Release ==
In late 2007, both this film and its predecessor, The Elm-Chanted Forest, received their DVD debut in the countries of former Yugoslavia from Happy TV. As of 2026, The Magician's Hat has seen no official release in North America.

== Cancelled US release ==
Peter Fernandez was working on an English dub for this film, but it was ultimately cancelled by American Distributors for reasons unknown, yet possibly due to the scene where Emperor Frostkill gets stabbed in the chest by the Sword of Salvation and thought it was too dark for Western viewers, namely children.

== See also ==
- Cinema of Yugoslavia
- Cinema of Croatia
- Lists of animated feature films
