= The Brave Adventures of Lapitch =

1913 novel by Ivana Brlić-Mažuranić

The Brave Adventures of Lapitc
- Title page for The Brave Adventures of Lapitch (1971)
- Author: Ivana Brlić-Mažuranić
- Original title: Čudne zgode šegrta Hlapića
- Language: Croatian
- Genre: Novel
- Publication date: 1913 (original); 1969 (reissue)
- Publication place: Croatia
- English publication date: 1972
- Media type: Print (Paperback)

The Brave Adventures of Lapitch (Croatian: Čudnovate zgode šegrta Hlapića), also known as The Marvellous Adventures of Lapich the Apprentice, is a 1913 novel by Croatian children's author Ivana Brlić-Mažuranić.

== Synopsis ==
In the story, a poor young orphan called Lapitch works as the apprentice for the Scowlers - a mean-mannered shoemaker, and his kind-hearted wife. After Master Scowler blames him for the wrong size of a customer's shoes, Lapitch leaves a note and runs away from home. Later joined by Bundaš, the Scowlers' dog, he sets off on a seven-day adventure, during which he meets Gita, a circus performer, and encounters a local thief known as the Black Man and his henchman named Grga.

== Reception ==
The novel received its first favorable review in October 1913 from Antun Gustav Matoš, the renowned Croatian writer, and has since received a number of enthusiastic assessments by literary historians, earning it the status of the "premiere Croatian children's novel".

Lapitch has been translated into all of Europe's major languages, as well as in Esperanto, Japanese, Vietnamese, Persian and Bengali among others. The Czech edition of the novel, completed during Brlić-Mažuranić's lifetime, was illustrated by Josef Lada.

== Movie adaptation(s) based on the story ==
- In 1997, the Croatia Film company released an animated feature adaptation, Lapitch the Little Shoemaker.
- In 2013, the Maydi Film & Video released a live action adaptation of this Croatian classic, The Brave Adventures of a Little Shoemaker adapted and directed by Silvije Petranović, which scored the top position on the list of the most watched children’s films since 1990.

More information about the translations of the novel into foreign languages is available online.

== Sources ==
- Zima, Dubravka (2013). "Stogodišnjica romana" (PDF). Hrvatska revija (in Croatian). XIII (3). Matica hrvatska: 20–25.
