= Antonije Orešković =

Serbian colonel (1829–1906)

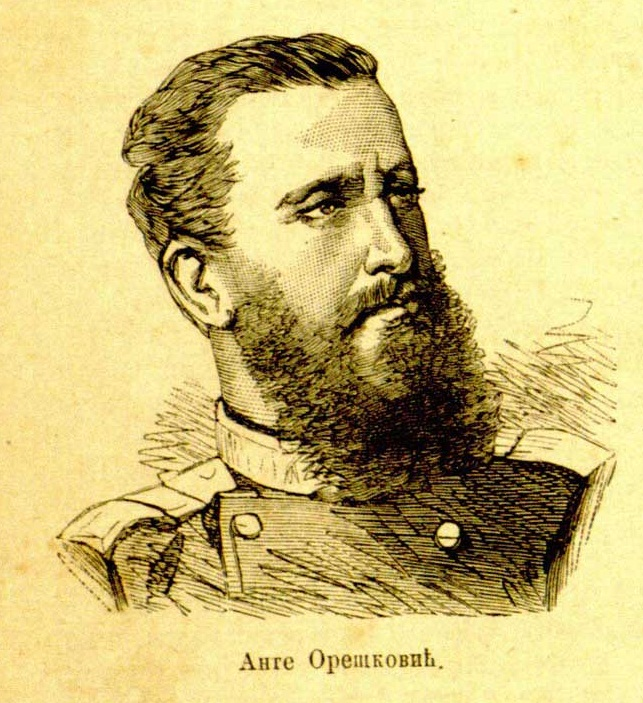
Antonije Orešković

Colonel Antonije "Ante" V. Orešković (7 January 1829 – 14 October 1906) was a Serbian colonel and a Serb of Military Frontier origin.

Antonije Orešković was a veteran of many battles, including the Franco-Austrian War, the Serbian-Turkish war and the Serbo-Bulgarian war. In addition to attaining colonel status in the Serbian army, he was also an intelligence officer, a diplomat, and a military theorist.

== Origin and family ==
Orešković was born on 7 January 1829, at the Dvor na Uni in the Banija region, in a Serbian border family in the Military Frontier (Military Militärgrenze) of the Austrian Empire. The day of St. Antonije (17 January 1829) was 10 days after his birth, therefore his parents gave him the name Antonije.

Antonije's father Vuk Orešković was a border officer, so his son followed his father with the choice of occupation.

The first recorded representative of this family is Đorđe Orešković, who, in 1498 and 1509, is mentioned along with Jovan Serbljin, as a resident in the Serbian village of Potok (on the mountain Kalnik in Croatia), and on that occasion, it is especially emphasized that Orešković family also referred to themselves as Rasciani.

== Military career ==
In the Austro-Hungarian War from 1848 to 1849, Orešković was a leading officer in the Austrian army.

From 1858, he established contact (and began cooperation) with Ilija Garašanin to realize his national program (Garašanin's Načertanije from 1844) aimed at the liberation and unification of the divided Serbian lands in the Balkans (Garašanin consciously left out the liberation from the Austrian Empire from "Načertanje" (1804-1867), because he did not want a war on two fronts).

It was Garašanin who planned for the very capable Orešković to be recruited to work for the Principality of Serbia.

From 1853 to 1862, he served in the Military Frontier, as an active officer of the Austrian Empire.

While at war with the Austrian army on the Apennine Peninsula, he came into contact with Italian revolutionaries and became acquainted with the conspiratorial work of the Carbonari (Italian secret society), which would affect his entire later life.

Orešković also took part in the Franco-Austrian War (Sardinian War). From 1853 to 1862, he served in the Military Frontier (1538–1881), as an active officer of the Austrian Empire. While at war with the Austrian army on the Apennine Peninsula, he came into contact with Italian revolutionaries and became acquainted with the conspiratorial work of the Carbonari (Italian secret society), which would decisively affect his entire later life.

== Initiator of the border guards' conspiracy against Austria ==
In July 1859, after returning from the war (which was fought in the north of today's Italy), Antonije was imbued with pan-Slavic ideas and began working on a conspiracy against the Habsburgs, not only seeking supporters among his fellow Serbs, but also among neighboring Croats. He also came into contact with Bosnian beys, working on the idea of Yugoslav military action.

After the Austrian authorities suspected him and his friends from the "Second Banija Militärgrenze Zweites Banal Infanterie Regiment, No. 11" in Petrinja, they reassigned them to various places. Orešković was transferred to Moravia, and he came to Vienna as a captain, where he met philologist Vuk Karadžić, who soon introduced him to Velimir Mihailo Teodorović, and became good friends thereafter.

== Military career in the Principality of Serbia and the Kingdom of Serbia ==
The Austrian authorities invited Ante Orešković to Zagreb in 1862, but he refused to go there because he knew that his anti-Habsburg activities among the border guards were already well-known to them.

In April 1862, at the invitation of Mihailo Obrenović, Prince of Serbia, Orešković left the military in Austria and joined the Serbian army, where he received the rank of infantry major.

Military duties in Serbia:

- From April to June 1862, he made himself available to the Minister of War and the Minister of Foreign Affairs for extraordinary missions (residing outside the Principality of Serbia)
- From June (during the conflict between Serbs and Turks) to November 1862, he was the commander of the Volunteer Corps
- From November 1862 to 15 May 1876, he was again at the disposal of the Minister of War and the Minister of Foreign Affairs.
- He was promoted to the rank of colonel on 15 May 1876
- From 15 May 1876 to 1 July 1876, he was Chief of Staff of the Drina Army and Commissioner in Vidin (Turkish Empire: 1299–1922).
- From 1 December 1876, to 1 June 1877, he was an infantry officer in the Ministry of Defense
- From 1 June 1877 to October 1877, he was a deputy commander of the Drina Army and an assistant in the headquarters of the Supreme Command.
- From October 1877 to November 1877, he was the commander of the Moravian Division
- From 15 November 1878, he was the commander of the Drina Division
- From 1880 to 1885, he was the commander of the Danube Divisional Area
- From 1885 to 1886, he was the commander of the Drina divisional area
- In the Serbo-Bulgarian war (1885), he was the commander of the Drina Division
- He retired on April 27, 1888.

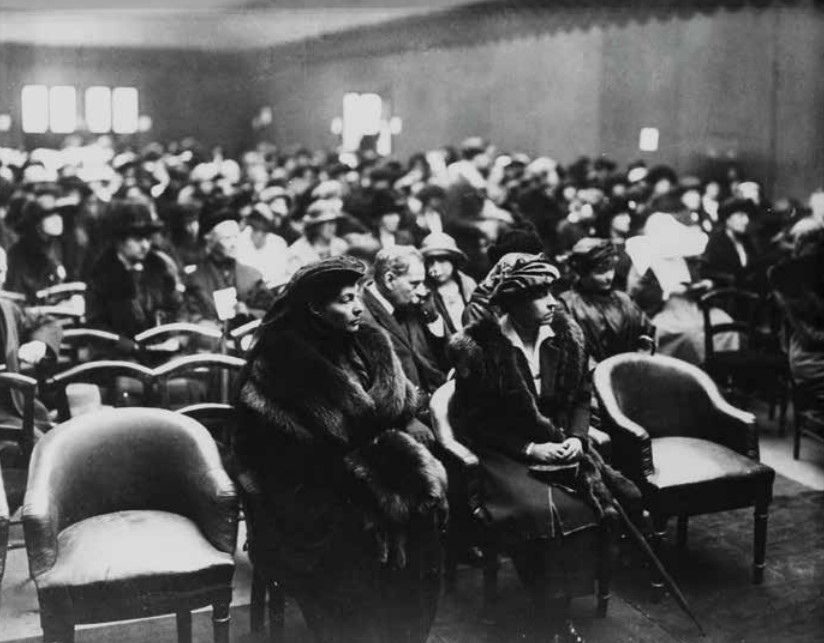
Antonije's daughter; Ružica Orešković, as lady in waiting with Queen Natalie in Paris

As a sworn opponent of Austria, Antonije Orešković openly expressed his disagreements with the Austrophile policy of Milan M. Teodorović Obrenović, King of Serbia, who even in 1883 delivered Garašanin's "Načertanije" to the Viennese court, which particularly angered Orešković, who dedicated almost his entire working life to its realization.

In the conflict between Queen Natalie and her husband, King Milan, "on the issue of divorce" (because of his infidelity), which shook the whole country at the end of the 19th century, Colonel Orešković without hesitation sided with the queen. After the 1903 May Coup, Queen Natalie bequeathed to him Villa Zlatni Breg, her former summer residence surrounded by vineyards. Both of his daughters, Ružica "Ruža" Orešković (1875-1959) and Milica "Mica" Cakić née Orešković (1876-1907), served as Queen Natalie's ladies in waiting, and followed her into an exile. After inheriting the villa, Antonije's sons, Borivoje and Milan significantly advanced the wine production. In 1909 they installed the hail cannons, among the first in Serbia.

Because of all the above (despite numerous military merits), King Milan Obrenović did not promote him to general, instead he retired him in 1888.

Immediately afterward, the king was forced to abdicate in 1889.

== Intelligence-national work ==
Formally, Orešković was Prince Mihailo Obrenović's man, but de facto, he was the main operative and implementer of military intelligence activities of Ilija Garašanin and Matija Ban, behind whom stood the Serbian prince.

Prince Mihailo brought him to the Serbian capital Belgrade, to prepare Serbia for the liberation wars against the Turkish occupier with his rich military experience.

On the unification of the Serbian ethnic corps into one state, Antonije Orešković in his book "Slavic Cooperative", published in 1872, states the following:

Having briefly observed all the existing external and internal relations of Serbia in this way, I repeat: for Serbia to be able to separate and unite and unite into one body, an independent Serbian state, it should be assumed in the first place that is in agreement with each other, then to silence the rivalry between Croats and Bulgarians, and finally to defeat Austria-Hungary and Turkey, and Germany behind Austria; for Austria will not be allowed to disintegrate before it has carried out its German Mission if they only have the strength in Berlin. Even before moving to Serbia, Captain Orešković provided a connection in 1858 to Prince Miloš Teodorović Obrenović with the naval steamship captain Francesco-Fran P. Franasović, a Dalmatian Serb (originally from Korčula and Brač), and at that time, according to his professional formation, a line inspector (branch in Orsha) of the Austrian First Danube Steamship Company from where he delivered evidence to the Serbian prince because he had his own private intelligence network in the Djerdap area.

Garašanin's military-diplomatic strategy with Austrian foes, after the armed incident near Čukur Fountain (and the later bombing of Belgrade), which in 1862 led to the partial withdrawal of the Turks from the Principality of Serbia, was Orašković's first successful engagement.

Serbia expected that this Turkish incident (in addition to Belgrade, there was also a conflict in the interior of the principality) would result in a wider war conflict in the Balkans, so it was rapidly preparing for it, and rightfully so.

Since Orešković was the only one who could get information from the Military frontier at first, the Serbian government entrusted Orešković with the task of organizing an action in that direction, and weapons were requested from the Russian Empire.

In terms of the realization of Serbian national interests, through his intelligence work, as well as the achieved results, Orešković paved the way for future Serbian intelligence officers such as Radomir D. Putnik, Dragutin T. Dimitrijević, and Žarko Todorović.

== Secret Agency Network and Volunteer Corps ==
As part of the Serbian army's preparations for future armed conflicts with the Turks, Orešković maintained secret ties between the Serbian government and prominent Serbian officers (Orthodox and Catholic) in the Military Border, that is, he was the main figure in the Serbian government's operational (secret) affairs with border guards. Orešković's task was to organize the recruitment of border guards, their transfer to Serbia, and then their inclusion in a Volunteer Corps (pus) stationed in Valjevo.

The committee in Karlovac was important, consisting of local patriots Edmund Kovačić (wholesaler from Osijek), Maša Solarž, Gustav Pfajfinger (later moved to Sisak), and Petar Uzelac (a merchant from Karlovac). This board managed to smuggle weapons and ammunition into Serbia.

In Petrovaradin, Orešković's agents were retired lieutenants Kosta Krstić and Mitar Kovačević, sergeant of the Petrovaradin Border Infantry Regiment no. 9, who, in October 1862, were preparing to forcibly break through the cordon near Klenk, in Srem, with about a thousand soldiers from Petrovaradin and to continue across Serbia.

At that time, the Volunteer Corps reached a number of 3,000 fighters.

== Retirement ==
In 1889, Orešković decided to withdraw from politics and retire.

He died in Belgrade.
