= Vladimir Mažuranić =

Croatian lawyer (1845–1928)

Vladimir Mažuranić (16 October 1845 – 17 January 1928) was a Croatian lawyer, lexicographer and academic.

== Life ==
He was born in Karlovac, as the son of Croatian Ban and writer Ivan Mažuranić, and father of writer Ivana Brlić-Mažuranić. He studied law in Vienna and received a degree at the Faculty of Law, University of Zagreb in 1866.

He worked in the civil service, in the judicial and law services in Karlovac and Ogulin, serving as a president of the Tabula Banalis (1898–1912). He became a full member of the Yugoslav Academy of Sciences and Arts in 1913, serving as its president in 1918–1921. He was an honorary member of the Czech Academy of Sciences, Polish Academy of Sciences, and Shevchenko Scientific Society in Lviv, Ukraine. He was also a member of Brethren of the Croatian Dragon.

His main work was Prinosi za hrvatski pravno-povjestni rječnik ("Contributions to the Croatian legal-historical dictionary", I–II, 1908–22), in which he collected and analyzed legal-historical Croatian lexical heritage.

He died 1928 in Zagreb.

== Works ==
- Grof Ivan, 1883.
- O rječniku pravnog nazivlja hrvatskoga, 1902.
- Prinosi za hrvatski pravno-povjestni rječnik, 1908.
- Dodatci uz prinose za hrvatski pravno-povjestni rječnik, 1923.
- Pjesme Ivana Mažuranića
- Izvori dubrovačkoga historika Jakova Lukarevića, 1924.
- Melek "Jaša Dubrovčanin" u Indiji god. 1480.-1528. i njegovi prethodnici u Islamu prije deset stoljeća, 1925.
- Pozdrav bratski sa našega Jadrana, 1925.
- Gebalim, 1927.
- Suedslaven im Dienste des Islams (vom X. bis ins XVI. Jahrhundert): ein Forschungsbericht aus Kroatisch erschienenen Studien, 1928.
- Civitatensis, 1931.
- Urbicus, 1931.

Academic offices
Preceded by Tomislav Maretić	Chairman of the Yugoslav Academy of Sciences and Arts; 1918–1921	Succeeded by Gustav Janeček
