= The Left Hand of God (novel) =

2010 novel by Paul Hoffman

- First edition
- Author: Paul Hoffman
- Language: English
- Series: The Left Hand of God
- Genre: Fantasy
- Publisher: Michael Joseph
- Publication date: 2010
- Publication place: United Kingdom
- Pages: 448
- ISBN: 978-0718155186
- Followed by: The Last Four Things

The Left Hand of God is a fantasy novel written by Paul Hoffman and first released in 2010. It is the first book in a trilogy with the same name. The second book is The Last Four Things, published in 2011, and the third is The Beating of His Wings, published in 2013.

== Setting ==
The world is in a pre-industrial state. Many nations are dispersed across the globe; most important of which are the Roman-like Materazzi, fanatical Redeemers and their eternal opponents, Antagonists.

The novel focuses the most on the conflict between Redeemers and Antagonists. The Redeemers train their new soldiers by either kidnapping or buying small children, bringing them into a half-prison, half-military training centre called the Sanctuary and through fear and pain transform them into soldiers (with a 50% death rate during the process).

== Plot ==
Thomas Cale, a 14-year-old boy is just another recruit of the great conflict between Redeemers and Antagonists – or so he thinks. Along with his two "friends" (friendship is forbidden and Cale is in general reluctant to make any closer bonds) named Kleist and Vague Henri, Cale not only finds a room full of delicious food, much different from their usual fare at the Sanctuary, but they also witness something they have been told is Devil's temptation and sinful – a room full of young girls, including two dressed in white.

Cale is later ordered to deliver a message to Lord Redeemer Picarbo, and walks in on him while he is too busy to notice. It turns out the redeemer has cut open one of the two girls dressed in white while she is still alive, and the other girl in the room is strapped and will be next. He is then attacked by Cale in an attempt to stop him from killing the other girl, which is named Riba, and ends up killing Picarbo. Realizing the consequences for both him, Riba, Kleist and Henri, he engineers and executes an escape from the Sanctuary. Amongst the things Cale has brought with him, is a sweet smelling object Picarbo had removed from the dead girl's body.

On their way to Memphis, a major city of the Matterazzi and their nearest safe haven, they encounter a slaughtered group of Matterazzi delegates with only one survivor, Chancellor Vipond. Cale and his companions are eventually captured by a Matterrazi armed group and escorted to Memphis, where they are eventually given a limited freedom and assigned to assist the local nobility.

Cale gets into a fight with several of the best local young warriors, including his temporary superior Conn Matterazzi, which he wins. This act immediately draws a great amount of attention to him and when Cale manages to rescue the Matterazzi princess Arbell Swan-Neck from the Redeemers who kidnapped her, the three former Redeemer recruits become a personal guard of the Matterazzi princess, who is both impressed and intimidated by Cale. The two soon fall in love.

The Redeemers continue in their provocative attempts to obtain Arbell and eventually, they silently declare a war against the Matterazzi – which seems like a reckless and foolish act given the fact that Matterazzi army is better trained, equipped and superior in all aspects.

The final confrontation however goes gravely ill for the favoured side. The Redeemers emerge victorious from the decisive battle and they seize Memphis; but are willing to leave the Matterazzi alone in exchange for one thing: Thomas Cale.

The Battle Lord of the Redeemers, Bosco, who was also responsible for the most of Cale's training back at the Sanctuary, claims that he had a vision of Cale being a creation of God, sent to fulfil the destiny of the Redeemers and cleanse humanity. Cale is betrayed by his lover Arbell and given to the Redeemers in exchange for peace.

== Characters ==
- Thomas Cale, a mysterious teenager gifted with deadly battle skills, but also capable of good deeds; also believed to be a legate of God. The novel's protagonist.
- Kleist, Cale's companion from the Sanctuary. He is a skilled bowman, usually grumpy and querulous, but does his tasks as he is supposed to.
- Vague Henri, probably the most peaceful of the former Redeemers' recruits, he tends to seek the least violent solution from all situations, but can handle himself in fight nevertheless.
- Riba, a teenage girl freed by the trio above as they escape the Sanctuary. She finds an occupation as a fille de chambre in Memphis.
- Bosco, The Lord Militant or The Battle Lord of the Redeemers. He is responsible for the most of Cale's training and he is also the one claiming that Cale is of special significance to the fate of the Earth.
- Lord Vipond, a chancellor of Memphis. He protects Cale with his companions, because he would rather employ them than see them on the other side of the barricade.
- Idris Pukke, the half brother to Lord Vipond. Idris Pukke used to be a famous general and skirt chaser, but has been declared as an outlaw in most of the known world. He collaborates with Cale and manages to win himself a partial pardon in the Matterazzi state.
- Arbell Swan-Neck, a daughter of the Matterazzi doge. She is extremely beautiful and eventually she and Cale become lovers, but she betrays him and literally exchanges him with Redeemers for the freedom of her country.

== Critical reception ==
The Left Hand of God received a largely negative reception from critics. The reviews in The Telegraph and The Guardian criticised a poor coherence through the novel, a mixture of too many genres and a confusing plot.
