= Angus Watson =

British writer

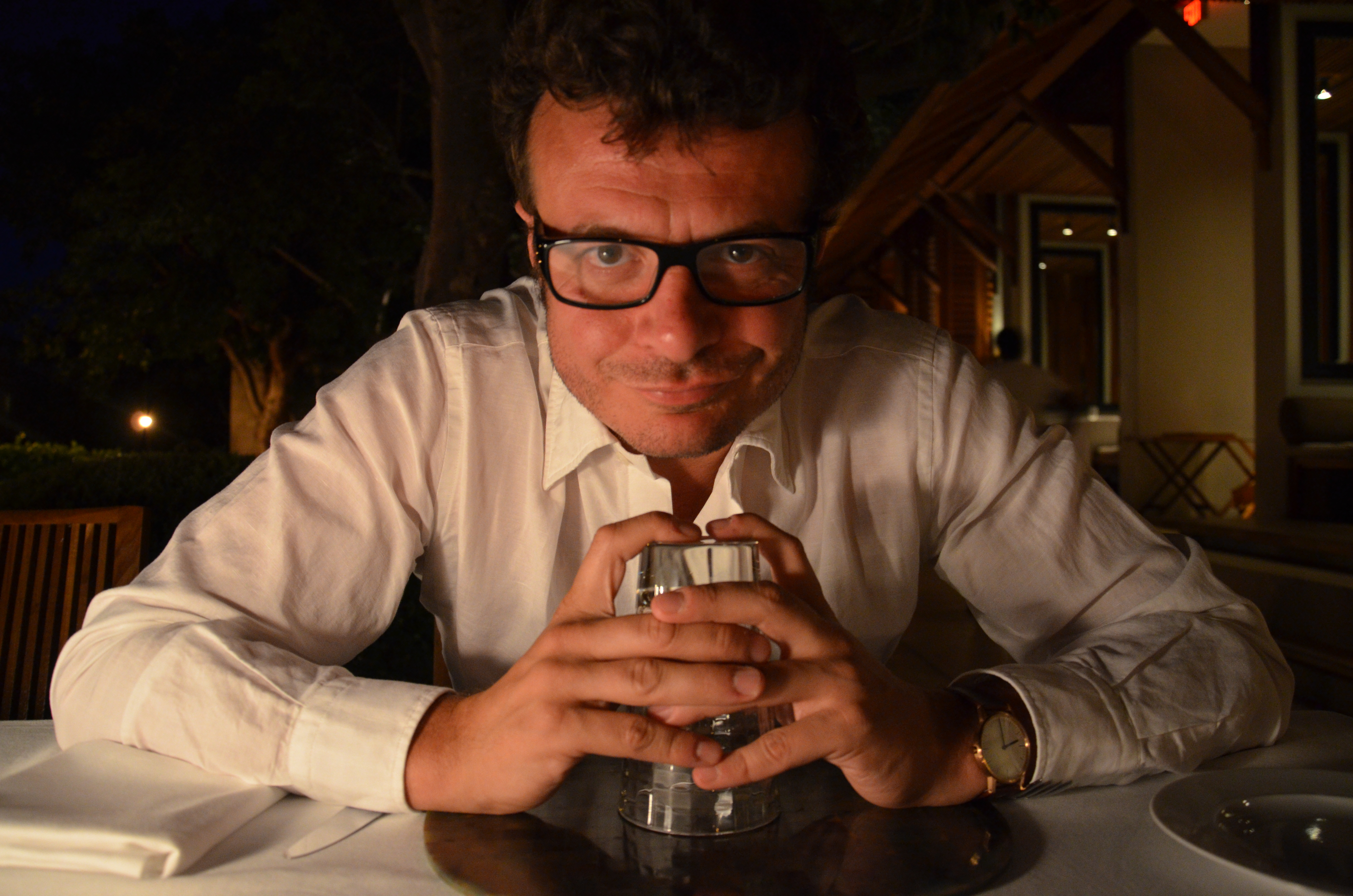
- Angus Watson, Age of Iron author
- Born: 4 September 1972 (age 53); Hexham, England
- Education: University
- Alma mater: University of Bristol
- Occupation: Novelist
- Spouse: Nicola
- Children: Charlie
- Writing career
- Genre: Fantasy
- Notable work: Age of Iron
- Website: guswatson.com

Angus Watson (born 4 September 1972) is a British novelist and journalist. His epic fantasy trilogy set in the British Iron Age began in 2014 with Age of Iron. Clash of Iron was released in March 2015 and Reign of Iron was released in September 2015. His second trilogy, West of West, is the epic tale of Vikings crossing a fantasy North America a thousand years ago. He is published by science fiction and fantasy imprint Orbit Books.

Watson lives in London with his wife Nicola and son Charlie. He came up with the idea of writing a fantasy trilogy set in the Iron Age when exploring British hillforts for the Telegraph. As a freelance journalist Watson has worked for the Telegraph, the Times and the Financial Times, writing features which included looking for Bigfoot in the USA (Telegraph), swimming with sea lions off the Galapagos Islands (Times) and diving on the scuppered German World War One fleet at Scapa Flow (FT).

== Bibliography ==
- Age of Iron (2014)
- Clash of Iron (2015)
- Reign of Iron (2015)
- You Die When You Die (2017)
- The Land You Never Leave (2018)
- Where Gods Fear to Go (2019)

== Reception ==
Age of Iron was chosen as one of Fantasy Faction's 'Best Fantasy Novels of 2014' and has been short listed for the David Gemmell Morningstar Award for Best Debut Fantasy Fiction novel. The book was widely reviewed by the genre press and book bloggers. Publishers Weekly said 'Watson's tale is gore soaked and profanity laden—full of visceral combat and earthy humor, and laced with subtle magic'. SF Crowsnest called it 'intelligent and exciting'. Crime novelist Christopher Brookmyre is also a fan.
