= Mirjana Bohanec =

Croatian opera singer and actor

- Born: October 2, 1939 (age 86); Zagreb, Yugoslavia
- Education: Academy of Music, University of Zagreb
- Occupations: Operatic soprano; actress; diplomat
- Spouses: Vladan Švab (died 2004); Ivo Vidović

Mirjana Bohanec, also known by her married name Mirjana Bohanec-Vidović, (born October 2, 1939) is a Croatian operatic soprano, film actress, and diplomat. She had an active performance career in operas and concerts from the mid 1960s into the early 1990s. She also appeared in six Croatian films from 1968 to 1986. After 1991 her career shifted into work as a diplomat, and she worked in Croatian embassies in Vienna and Hamburg prior to serving as an Assistant Minister of Foreign Affairs and European Integration from 2006 to 2008.

== Early life and education ==
Mirjana Bohanec was born in Zagreb on October 2, 1939. She received her early voice training from Nade Pirnat, and in her early life was employed in the classical music division of Radio Zagreb which broadened her knowledge. She studied singing at the Academy of Music, University of Zagreb (AMUZ) where she was a pupil of Ivo Lhotka-Kalinski. In 1967 she portrayed Susanna in AMUZ's production of Wolfgang Amadeus Mozart's The Marriage of Figaro. She graduated from AMUZ in 1968.

== Performance career ==
While a university student, Bohanec made her professional opera debut in 1966 at the Croatian National Theatre, Zagreb (CNTZ), remaining there as a resident artist for two years under conductor Milan Sachs. Her first performance with CNTZ was as the soprano soloist in a staged production of Orff's Carmina Burana on April 16, 1966 which co-starred baritone Vladimir Ruždjak who also directed the production. After winning a grant from the Austrian Cultural Institute (now known as the Austrian Cultural Forum), she pursued further studies with Emmy Loose in Vienna and Salzburg.. From 1968 to 1969 she was committed to the Vienna Volksoper.

Bohanec returned to the Croatian National Opera in 1970 where she remained for the rest of her career. She was an audience favorite in a new production of Mozart's The Magic Flute (1974) in which she portrayed Papagena, and the following year she successfully sang her first prima donna role, Adina in Gaetano Donizetti's L'elisir d'amore (1975). Her next major role was Antonia in Offenbach's The Tales of Hoffmann (1976). For her work in the 1980-1981 season Bohanec was awarded the Milka Trnina Award by Croatian Association of Music Artists (HDGU). In 1980 she portrayed Fortuna in Blagoje Bersa's Postolar od Delfta, and in 1984 she gave her first performance as Norina in Donizetti's Don Pasquale.

Bohanec's other repertoire mainly consisted of soubrette and lyric coloratura soprano roles, including Antonia in Offenbach's The Tales of Hoffmann, Blonde in Mozart's Die Entführung aus dem Serail, Countess Lydia in Baron Trenck, Jelene in Zajc's Nikola Šubić Zrinski, Musetta in Puccini's La bohème, Nedda in Ruggero Leoncavallo's Pagliacci, Oscar in Giuseppe Verdi's Un ballo in maschera, Rosina in Rossini's The Barber of Seville, Mozart's Susanna, Violetta in Verdi's La traviata, Zdneka in Strauss's Arabella, and Zerlina in Mozart's Don Giovanni.

On the concert stage Bohanec has appeared frequently as a soloist in chamber music concerts given at universities in Croatia, and has given concert tours of Italy, Spain, and the United States. She also had a leading role in the film One Song a Day Takes Mischief Away (1970) and has appeared in other Croatian movies.

== Diplomatic work and later life ==
After the Independence of Croatia in 1991, Bohanec's career shifted away from performance towards diplomatic work. She worked for the Croatian Embassy in Vienna until 1999 when she went to work for the Consul General of the Republic of Croatia in Hamburg, Germany as a cultural counselor. From 2006 to 2008 she was Assistant Minister of Foreign Affairs and European Integration in the Directorate for Croatian Minorities, Emigration, and Immigration. Her first marriage was to the director Vladan Švab who died in 2004. She is currently married to Dr. Ivo Vidović, director of home health in Runjanin street in Zagreb.

== Movies ==
- "Putovanje u Vučjak", as a Šolcova (1986)
- "Živi bili pa vidjeli", as a Mrs. Klarić (1979)
- "Skakavac", (1975)
- "Živjeti od ljubavi", as a Vanda (1973)
- "Tko pjeva zlo ne misli", as an Ana Šafranek (1970)
- "Tri sata za ljubav", (1968)
