= The Elm-Chanted Forest =

- Directed by: Milan Blažeković; Doro Vlado Hreljanovic
- Screenplay by: Fred P. Sharkey
- Story by: Sunčana Škrinjarić
- Produced by: Doro Vlado Hreljanovic; Carroll Rue; Vlado Teresak
- Starring: Josip Marotti; Ljubo Kapor; Ivo Rogulja
- Cinematography: Ernest Gregl
- Music by: Dennis Leogrande
- Production companies: Croatia Film; Fantasy Forest Films Inc.
- Distributed by: Celebrity Home Entertainment's Just for Kids (U.S.); Castle Home Video (UK)
- Release dates: June 19, 1986 (Yugoslavia); November 11, 1986 (U.S. TV); January 4, 1989 (U.S. VHS)
- Running time: 79 minutes
- Country: Yugoslavia
- Languages: Croatian; English

The Elm-Chanted Forest (Čudesna šuma) is a 1986 Yugoslavian-American animated musical film; in the U.S., it is also known as Fantasy Forest. It was the first full-length film directed by Milan Blažeković, and also the first animated feature produced in Yugoslavia.

== Plot ==
Nature-loving artist Peter Palette takes a nap under an enchanted elm tree, which grants him the ability to communicate with the animals of the forest and to cast spells with his paintbrush. As he is granted shelter at the lodge of J. Edgar Beaver, a crow reports his appearance to Emperor Spine the cactus king, whose reign is prophesied by his wind-riding soothsayer Baron Burr to be ended by a human. Spine orders his court magician Thistle to execute J. Edgar and to deliver Peter to his castle so that Spine can personally devour him. On his way to collect Palette, Thistle recruits retired athlete Bud E. Bear to assist in his errand after removing a thorn from his foot. Bud E. in turn treats Thistle to a round at Beaver's Sashay Inn and Saloon and befriends him. After Bud E. is won over by Peter's collage of his glory years, Emperor Spine orders his sentient battle axes, the Spine-Tinglers, to raid the forest for Peter. To add to this effort, Emperor Spine provokes the flame spirit Fire Bug into setting a wildfire. Peter uses his brush to create a thunderstorm that extinguishes the fire, and Fire Bug warns Peter of Emperor Spine's role in the accident.

As Peter assists in rebuilding, J. Edgar informs him of the prophecy that is the cause of Emperor Spine's antagonism. Meanwhile, the sea king Nepton is angered by the burnt debris that now litters the local lakes and rivers, but is soothed to sleep by his chorus of frogs. When Emperor Spine wakes Nepton from his rest and orders him to create a flash flood, Nepton recognizes Spine as the cause of the pollution and ejects him from his abode with a bottomless water keg, which creates Spine's desired flood. After Peter experiences difficulty in creating a heat wave that evaporates the excess water, he consults the enchanted elm about his fading powers. Baron Burr appears and tells Peter that the elm's gift is temporary, and that he must fulfill the prophecy by the coming sunrise. Under Burr's instruction, Peter seeks out Thistle, who relays the details of the prophecy. Upon hearing that Spine's "hopes will flower", Peter surmises that Spine's frustration stems from his failure to bloom. As the forest animals create a potion that will encourage flower growth, the crow reports Thistle's treason to Emperor Spine, who orders Thistle's arrest. Peter attempts to rescue Thistle, but falls down a hole. Baron Burr informs J. Edgar of Thistle's imprisonment and Peter's plummet, and J. Edgar goes to Emperor Spine's castle to rescue Thistle. Furthermore, Bud E. mistakes the finished brew for light beer and downs the whole tub, requiring another batch to be mixed. Emperor Spine sentences Thistle to execution and unveils the Spine-Roller, a gargantuan machine capable of razing the entire forest.

Peter is captured by a colony of sentient mushrooms led by Mr. Truffle, who plans on transforming Peter into a mushroom. As J. Edgar and the mole Momo rescue Thistle from Emperor Spine's dungeon, Bud E. awakes from his stupor and goes to find Peter. After Peter is treated to a musical number by Mr. Truffle's guard Michael J. Mushroom, Bud E. is led to the mushrooms' cave by a residing snail and he rescues Peter. When the new batch is finished, Peter announces his intent to return to his village after his powers disappear. Peter and the others infiltrate Emperor Spine's castle, and as Bud E. and J. Edgar fend off the Spine-Tinglers, Peter sneaks to the sleeping Spine and pours the potion into his mouth. The potion succeeds in causing Emperor Spine to bloom and transforms into a happy and benevolent ruler, which in turn transforms his domain into a fertile greenland and the Spine-Roller into a Ferris wheel. Following a joyous festival, Peter bids a bittersweet farewell to the forest residents and departs for his village.

== Cast ==
- Cactus Czar – Josip Marotti
- Painter Pallet – Vili Matula
- Beaver – Ljubo Kapor
- Mate – Emil Glad
- Wand – Ivo Rogulja

Additional voices

- Helena Buljan
- Durda Ivezic
- Sven Lasta
- Vladimir Kovacic
- Adam Vedernjak
- Nada Rocco – Lili
- Vladimir Puhalo
- Veronika Durbesic
- Mladen Vasary
- Drago Krca
- Slavica Fila
- Richard Simonelli – Guster Gondolar
- Lena Politeo

American voices

- Lauren Shanahan
- Eric Needham
- Edward Eyrich
- Carroll Rue
- Fred P. Sharkey
- Mark Surkin
- Simon Hefter
- Anna Tornhill
- Paul Powers
- David Spelvin
- David Earls
- Charles Forrest
- Chris Helmer
- Francesca Picchi

== Production ==
The Elm-Chanted Forest is a co-production between the Zagreb-based Croatia Film and the New York City–based Fantasy Forest Films, Inc.. The film was directed by Doro Vlado Hreljanovic. Milan Blažeković designed the film's characters and directed the animation. The screenplay was written by Fred P. Sharkey based on an original story by Suncana Skrinjaric. The score was composed by Dennis Leogrande and performed by the New Zagreb Symphony Orchestra. The leitmotif of the character Fifi was created by Arsen Dedić. The animation was produced in-house by Croatia Film, with the animation team consisting of Blažeković, Leo Fabiani, Turido Paus, Vjekoslav Radilovic, Elizabeth Abramovic, Zvonimir Delac and Vladimir Hrs. The English version was recorded at New York City–based studio August Films under the direction of Peter Fernandez. The English version's cast consists of David Earls, Edward Eyrich, Charles Forrest, Simon Hefter, Chris Helmer, Eric Needham, Francesca Picchi, Paul Powers, Carroll Rue, Lauren Shanahan, Fred P. Sharkey, David Spelvin, Mark Surkin and Anna Tornhill. The chorus of the closing number "Time and Again" was provided by the New Jersey–based Pro Arte Chorale.

== Release ==
In the United States, The Elm-Chanted Forest premiered on HBO on November 11, 1986, and Celebrity Home Entertainment's Just for Kids label released The Elm-Chanted Forest on VHS and Beta on January 4, 1989. There is also a 1990 sequel, The Magician's Hat (Čarobnjakov šešir), which was rejected by American distributors due to its perceived violence, as it stayed at its home country.

In 1999, Image Entertainment released only the first film on DVD. To date, this is the only time it surfaced on DVD in the US as these copies are now out-of-print, making them extremely scarce.
