= Croatia Film =

Croatia Film d.o.o. (formerly Croatia Film d.d.) is a state-owned film production and distribution company based in Zagreb, Croatia. It began operations in 1946.

The company produced the region's only animated features to date during the 1980s and 1990s, all directed by Milan Blažeković: The Elm-Chanted Forest, The Magician's Hat, and Lapitch the Little Shoemaker.

Croatia Film was also involved in two animated television series: a spin-off of Lapitch in 2000, and the satirical Laku noć, Hrvatska (Good Night, Croatia) from 2005.

In the U.S. end credits of The Elm-Chanted Forest, Croatia Film's name was spelled as one word.
