= Paul Hoffman (English writer) =

Author (born 1953)

Paul Hoffman (born 1953) is an author, who wrote the Left Hand of God trilogy.

He studied English at New College, Oxford. Paul Hoffman wrote the script for the 1998 vampire film The Wisdom of Crocodiles with Jude Law, Timothy Spall and Elina Löwensohn. A portion of his first novel was loosely based on the film of the same name. His second novel, a dark comedy entitled The Golden Age of Censorship, was based on his experience as a film censor at the British Board of Film Classification.

== Bibliography ==
- The Wisdom of Crocodiles (2000)
- The Golden Age of Censorship (2007)
- Scorn (2017)

The Left Hand of God Trilogy

- The Left Hand of God (2010)
- The Last Four Things (2011)
- The Beating of His Wings (2013)
- The White Devil (2021)
