= Milan Blažeković =

Croatian animator (1940–2019)

Milan Blažeković (6 July 1940 – 30 May 2019) was a Croatian animator.

Blažeković began his career at the Zagreb Film studio with "mini" short films such as The Fish, Ikarus, Vergl and Gorilla Dance (1968), The Man Who Had to Sing (October 1971) and Man: The Polluter (August 8, 1973), the latter for the National Film Board of Canada. In later years, he directed three children's films with the animation unit of Croatia Film: The Elm-Chanted Forest (June 19, 1986), The Magician's Hat (January 1, 1990) and Lapitch the Little Shoemaker (October 23, 1997).

By around 2000, Blažeković ended his partnership with Croatia Film, and returned to Zagreb Film to work on a fourth animated feature, Tales of Long Ago (Priče iz davnine), which was initially planned for a Christmas 2003 release.

Blažeković was involved in two 2011 projects: one of which was The Hedgehog's House (Ježeva kućica), and an adaptation of Veselin Gatalo's Bosnian book, Ja sam pas… i zovem se Salvatore.
