= Ivo Škrabalo =

Croatian film director, screenwriter, and politician (1934–2011)

Ivo Škrabalo (pronounced [ǐːʋɔ ʃkrǎːbalo]; 19 February 1934 – 18 September 2011) was a Croatian film critic, screenwriter, and member of parliament.

Škrabalo was born in Sombor, where he finished elementary and high school before moving to Zagreb in 1952. He enrolled at the University of Zagreb's Faculty of Law and earned an MSc in international law, with a doctoral thesis on the creation of Bangladesh.

He also studied at the Zagreb Academy of Dramatic Art and graduated from its film directing department. Škrabalo then worked as a dramaturge at Zagreb-based film studios Zagreb Film (1958–1962) and Jadran Film (1964–1967) and was later hired as an advisor at Croatia Film in the late 1960s. He directed a number of short films and wrote or co-wrote several screenplays for feature films including the 1970 comedy classic One Song a Day Takes Mischief Away.

Škrabalo was also a prolific film critic and he made significant contributions to film publications published by the Miroslav Krleža Institute of Lexicography. He also authored four books about the history of Croatian cinema, including his seminal work 101 Years of Film in Croatia 1896–1997 published in 1998. He also gained some fame for quirky translations of titles of imported pornographic films which entered nationwide distribution in Yugoslavia in the 1980s.

In the early 1990s Škrabalo became involved in politics. Between 1991 and 1992 he briefly a senior post in the ministry of culture in the national unity government led by Prime Minister Franjo Gregurić, and was elected to the Croatian Parliament twice – from 1992 to 1995 he served as member of the Croatian Social Liberal Party (HSLS) and from 2000 to 2003 as member of its short-lived splinter party LIBRA which later merged into the Croatian People's Party. He was one of the mayors proposed by the opposition and rejected by President Franjo Tuđman during the 1995–1997 Zagreb crisis.

Scientist and diplomat Zdenko Škrabalo was his older brother.
