= Ivana Brlić-Mažuranić =

Croatian writer (1874–1938)

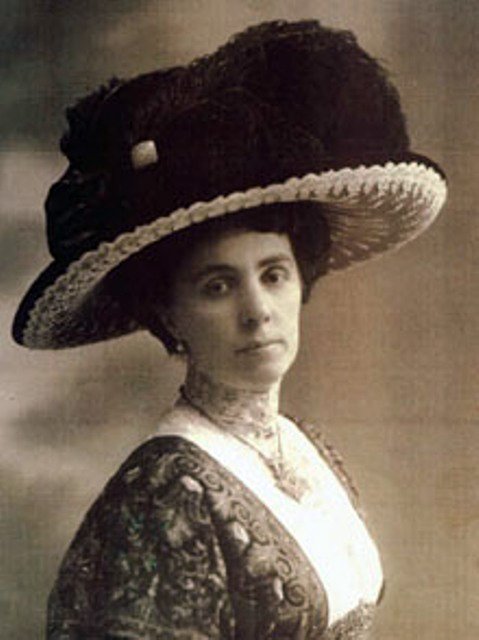
- Brlić-Mažuranić in 1898
- Born: Ivana Mažuranić; 18 April 1874; Ogulin, Croatian Military Frontier, Austria-Hungary (modern-day Ogulin, Croatia)
- Died: 21 September 1938 (aged 64); Zagreb, Sava Banovina, Kingdom of Yugoslavia (modern-day Zagreb, Croatia)
- Citizenship: Austria-Hungary, Kingdom of Yugoslavia
- Occupations: Novelist, short story writer, fairy tales writer
- Spouse: Vatroslav Brlić (m. 1892–1938)
- Relatives: Ivan Mažuranić (grandfather); Vladimir Mažuranić (father)
- Writing career
- Language: Croatian
- Period: 1902–1937
- Notable works: The Brave Adventures of Lapitch, Croatian Tales of Long Ago

Ivana Brlić-Mažuranić (pronounced [ǐʋana bř̩ːlitɕ maʒǔranitɕ]; 18 April 1874 – 21 September 1938), also spelled Ivana Berlic-Mazuranic in English, was a Croatian writer. She has been praised as the best Croatian writer for children.

== Early life ==
She was born on 18 April 1874 in Ogulin (baptized as Ivanna Cornelia Emilia Henrietta) into a well-known Croatian family of Mažuranić. Her father Vladimir Mažuranić was a writer, lawyer and historian who wrote Prinosi za hrvatski pravno-povjestni rječnik (Croatian dictionary for history and law) in 1882. Her grandfather was a politician, the Ban of Croatia and poet Ivan Mažuranić, while her grandmother Aleksandra Demeter was the sister of well-known writer and one of keypersons of Croatian national revival movement, Dimitrija Demeter. Ivana was largely home-schooled. With the family she moved first to Karlovac, then to Jastrebarsko, and ultimately to Zagreb.

Upon marriage to Vatroslav Brlić, a politician and a prominent lawyer in 1892, she moved to Brod na Savi (today Slavonski Brod) where she entered another known family and lived there for most of her life. She became the mother of seven children and devoted all her work to her family and education. Her first literary creations were initially written in French.

== Work ==
Ivana Brlić-Mažuranić started writing poetry, diaries and essays rather early, but her works were not published until the beginning of the 20th century. Her stories and articles, like the series of educational articles under the name School and Holidays, started to be published more regularly in the journals after 1903.

It was in 1913 when her book The Marvelous Adventures and Misadventures of Hlapić the Apprentice (also known as The Brave Adventures of Lapitch and Čudnovate zgode šegrta Hlapića) was published that really caught the literary public's eye. In the story, the poor apprentice Hlapić accidentally finds his master's lost daughter as his luck turns for the better.

Her book Croatian Tales of Long Ago (Priče iz davnine), published in 1916, is among the most popular today. Mažuranić created a series of new fairy-tales, but using names and motifs from the Slavic mythology of Croats. It was this that earned her comparisons to Hans Christian Andersen and Tolkien, who also wrote novel stories based in some elements of real mythology.

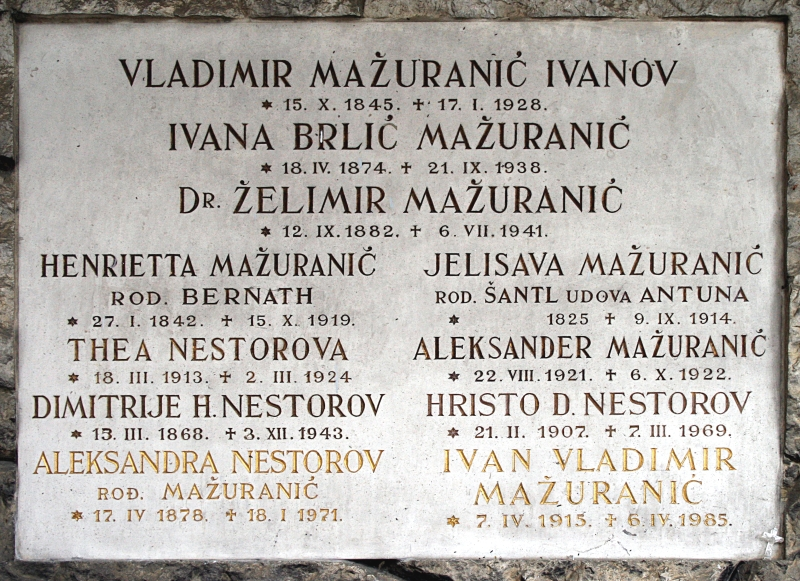
Gravestone of Ivana Brlić-Mažuranić at the Mirogoj Cemetery in Zagreb

Brlić-Mažuranić was nominated for the Nobel Prize in Literature four times – in 1931 and 1935 by the historian Gabriel Manojlović, and in 1937 and 1938 by him and the philosopher Albert Bazala, both based in Zagreb. In 1937 she also became the first woman accepted as a Corresponding Member into the Yugoslav Academy of Sciences and Arts. She was awarded Order of Saint Sava.

After a long battle with depression, she committed suicide on 21 September 1938 in Zagreb. She is buried at Mirogoj Cemetery in Zagreb.

== List of works ==
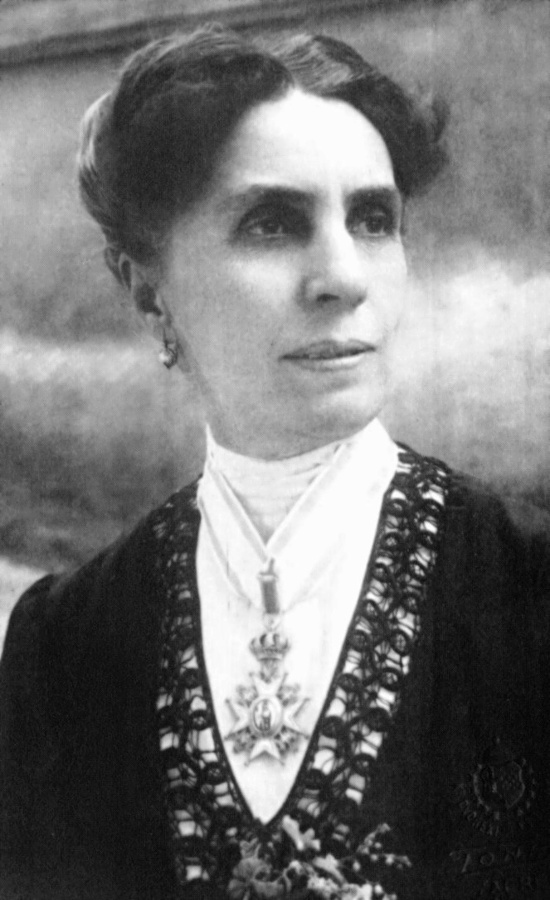
Brlić-Mažuranić in her later years

- 1902 The Good and the Mischievous (Valjani i nevaljani)
- 1905 School and Holidays (Škola i praznici)
- 1912 Pictures (poetry) (Slike)
- 1913 The Brave Adventures of Lapitch (Čudnovate zgode šegrta Hlapića)
- 1916 Croatian Tales of Long Ago (Priče iz davnine)
- 1923 A Book for Youth (Knjige o omladini)
- 1935 From the Archives of Family Brlić in Brod na Savi (Iz arhive obitelji Brlić u Brodu na Savi)
- 1937 Jaša Dalmatin Viceroy of the Gujarati (Jaša Dalmatin, potkralj Gudžarata)
- 1939 Gingerbread Heart (Srce od licitara)
- 1943 Fables and Fairy-tales (Basne i bajke)

=== Translations ===
Her books of novels and fairy tales for children, originally intended to educate her own, have been translated into nearly all European languages. Highly regarded and valued by both national and foreign literary critics, she obtained the title of Croatian Andersen.

The Marvelous Adventures and Misadventures of Hlapić the Apprentice was translated, among other languages, into Bengali (by Dr. Probal Dashgupta), Hindi, Chinese (by Shi Cheng Tai), Vietnamese (a few chapters), Turkish, Japanese (by Sekoguchi Ken) and Parsi (by Achtar Etemadi). Most of the latter translations were made indirectly, through Esperantists. The book's most recent Esperanto translation is by Maja Tišljar, with significant contributions by Spomenka Štimec.

== Film ==
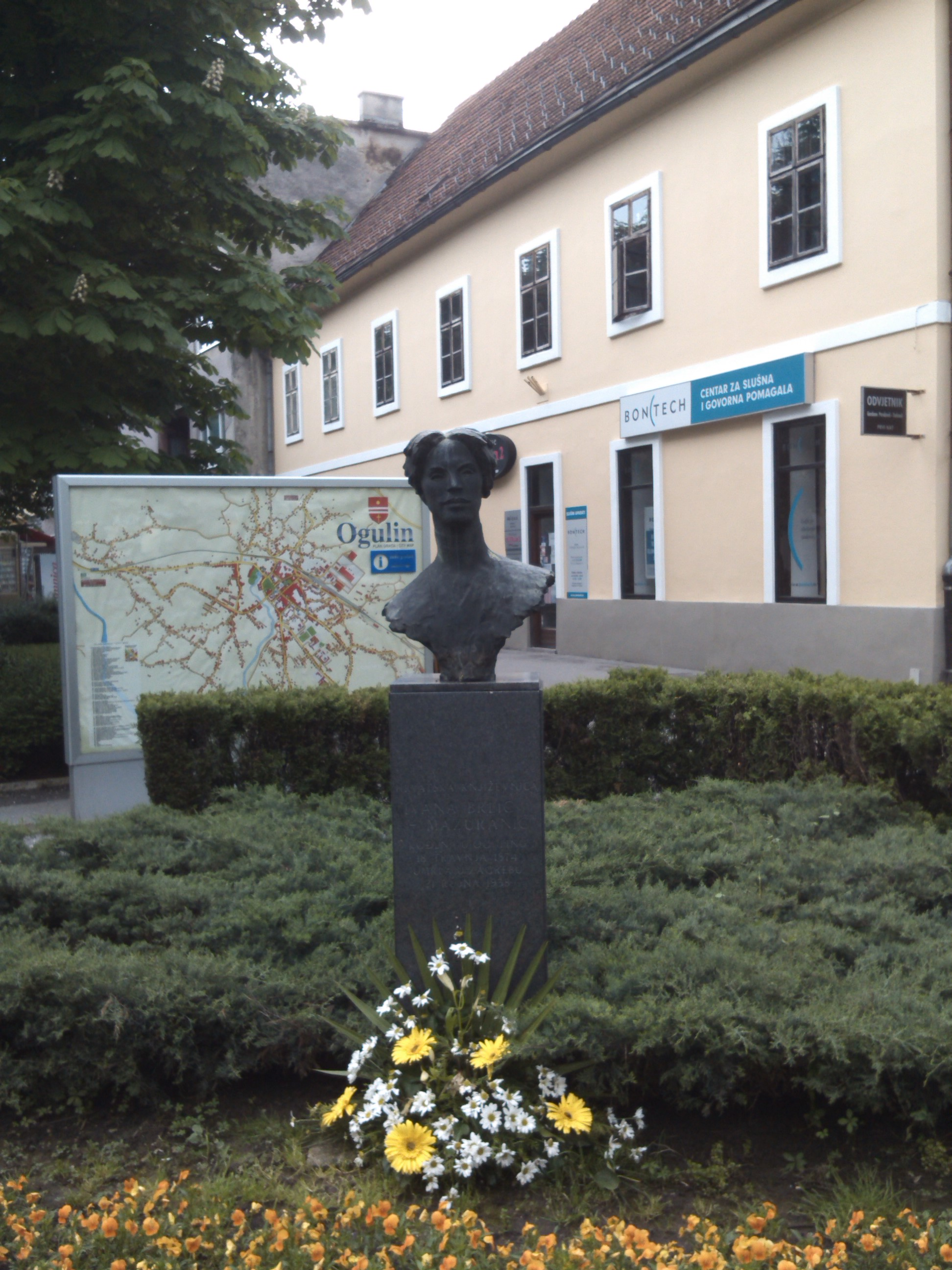
Bust in her native Ogulin

In the 1990s, the Croatia Film company adapted Brlić-Mažuranić's work The Marvellous Adventures and Misadventures of Hlapić the Apprentice as a children's animated feature, Lapitch the Little Shoemaker. Originally released in 1997, it became Croatia's most successful theatrical release, and was its official submission to the 70th Academy Awards (in the Best Foreign Language Film category).

Milan Blažeković, the director of Lapitch, has been developing another animated adaptation of her works since 2000, Tales of Long Ago (Priče iz davnine).

In 2000, Helena Bulaja started an interactive animated project based on her book Croatian Tales of Long Ago. The project, which consists of eight animated interactive stories, cartoons and games, was published as two CD-ROMs and a series of book/DVD editions. It was created in Flash by eight independent international teams of animators, illustrators, musicians, programmers, and actors. The project and the animations won several awards at Flashforward San Francisco, Lucca Comics and Games multimedia award, International Family Film Festival in Hollywood and others. A series of innovative educational iPhone and iPad games based on the project are in development.
