= Cinema of Croatia =

- No. of screens: 146 (2011)
  - Per capita: 3.7 per 100,000 (2011)
- Main distributors: Blitz Film&Video 58.0% Discovery 20.0% Continental Film 11.0%

Produced feature films (2011)
- Fictional: 6
- Animated: -
- Documentary: 3

Number of admissions (2011)
- Total: 3,536,027
  - Per capita: 0.9 (2012)
- National films: 92,855 (2.6%)

Gross box office (2011)
- Total: HRK 103 million

The cinema of Croatia has a somewhat shorter tradition than what is common for other Central European countries: the serious beginning of Croatian cinema starts with the rise of the Yugoslavian film industry in the 1940s. Three Croatian feature films were nominated for the Academy Award for Best Foreign Language Film, several of them gained awards at major festivals, and the Croatian contribution in the field of animation is particularly important.

== History ==
=== Early 20th century ===
Although motion pictures appeared in Croatia relatively early, for most of the early 20th Century film was almost exclusively the domain of a few dedicated amateur enthusiasts, most notably Josip Karaman in Split and, later, Oktavijan Miletić in Zagreb. In 1906, the first permanent movie theater was established in Zagreb.

Josip Halla produced and directed early documentaries in 1911 and 1912. The first full-length movie was Brcko u Zagrebu released in 1917, and directed by Arsen Maas. It was followed by Matija Gubec, released in the same year and directed by Aca Binički. Neither of these movies survive to this day. In 1918, Croatia Film produced additional 5 movies all directed by Josip Halla before the proprietor dissolved the company.

Croatia lacked the political and economic infrastructure to support its own cinema industry. The most serious effort in that direction before World War II was the series of educational films produced by Škola Narodnog Zdravlja.

=== World War II ===
The cinema of Croatia became an institution after the establishment of the Independent State of Croatia (NDH) in 1941. The new Ustaše regime quickly realised the need for modern propaganda tools modeled on those of Nazi Germany and Fascist Italy. After serious lobbying of these two governments for technical advice and resources, the first propaganda films were made in late 1941. Croatian filmmakers like Branko Marjanović produced in 1943 the documentary Straža na Drini, which later won the Golden Lion award at the Venice Film Festival, attended by Axis power countries.

After the collapse of NDH in 1945, Tito's victorious Communists also recognised the importance of the film industry and decided to build their own. Many technicians and co-workers of the Ustaše propaganda cinema industry during the war were in fact double agents working for the partisan side, with one main task: to keep the technical facilities untouched upon the collapse of NDH. Therefore, the new regime inherited the technical equipment, and more importantly trained personnel, including directors and top officials. The result of such a policy was the rapid development of the Croatian film industry, although initially under jurisdiction of the federal government in Belgrade.

=== Early communist period ===
In 1947 Jadran Film studios were founded in Zagreb.

=== First Golden Era: Late 1950s ===
Croatian feature films from the 1950s were not easily distinguishable from those made in the rest of Yugoslavia; this was mainly owing to the free flow of resources, information and talent among the various parts of the country. It had its first serious peak in the late 1950s, when Croatian film were possibly the most mature in the then-young Yugoslav film industry. The most important director of that era was Branko Bauer, a Dubrovnik-born director whose most famous film is the urban war thriller Ne okreći se, sine (Don't Look Back My Son, 1956). Loosely based on Carol Reed's film Odd Man Out, it depicts of a fugitive from an Ustasha camp who comes to Zagreb to find his son, only to find him brainwashed.

Among other important Bauer films are Tri Ane (Three Annas, 1959), produced in Macedonia, about a father who finds out that his daughter, whom he presumed to have been killed in the war, could be alive. Bauer's film Licem u lice (Face To Face, 1963) tells the story about a corrupt director of a construction company who confronts a rebel worker during a communist party cell meeting. It is considered the first overtly political film in Yugoslavia. Another notable 1950s' figure is Nikola Tanhofer, former cinematographer and specialist for various action genres. His most famous film is H8 (1958), a reconstruction of a real traffic accident in which several passengers on an intercity bus between Zagreb and Belgrade were killed, and in which the driver of the car who caused the accident escaped. Following in parallel three vehicles and dozens of picturesque scenes, H8 offers a mosaic-like picture of late 1950s society. In this period, two Croatian films were Academy Award nominees for foreign language film. Both of them were directed by guests from abroad: Italian Giuseppe De Santis with Cesta duga godina dana (A Road One Year Long, 1958), and Slovenian France Štiglic with Deveti krug (The Ninth Circle, 1960).

=== Modernism ===
In the 1960s, Croatian cinema saw changes of style, in part owing to directors embracing modernism. The first modernist film was Prometej s otoka Viševice (Prometheus of the Island, 1965) by former cartoonist Vatroslav Mimica. Using techniques derived from the stream-of consciousness novel, Mimica tells a story about a partisan veteran and communist executive who travels to his native island and faces ghosts of the post-war past. Among other famous modernist classics, the most significant are Rondo (1966) by Zvonimir Berković, and Breza (The Birch Tree, 1967) by Ante Babaja. The most popular director was Krešo Golik, who made comedies. Most popular of his films was Tko pjeva zlo ne misli (Who Sings Doesn't Mean Wrong, 1970), a romantic comedy set in 1930s Zagreb. Croatia also participated in the pan-Yugoslav "black wave", although the best authors and films of the black wave were Serbian. Most famous black wave classic from Croatia is Lisice (Handcuffs, 1969, by Krsto Papić), a film which is politically relevant because it is Croatia's first cultural product that dealt with repression against communists who supported Stalin in famous breakup between Tito and Stalin in 1948.

In 1969, the film Battle of Neretva directed by Veljko Bulajić was one of the most expensive foreign language films made in Yugoslavia.

In the early 1970s, following Yugoslav constitutional changes, Croatia gained more autonomy in shaping its cultural affairs., but following the collapse of the Croatian Spring, authorities pushed for tighter control over films.

=== Prague School and Genre Cinema ===
Fresh air came to Yugoslav cinema in the late 1970s and early 1980s with the so-called Prague School, a group of directors educated at the Prague Academy FAMU. Amongst the five directors usually presumed to be Prague School, two came from Croatia: Lordan Zafranović, and Rajko Grlić. Grlić's most famous film, competing at Cannes, is Samo jednom se ljubi (1981), a political melodrama that depicts the early communist establishment in the late 1940s. Zafranović's most famous films were Okupacija u 26 slika (Occupation in 26 Pictures) and Pad Italije (The Fall of Italy), both of them war films set in coastal Dalmatia, and both screened at Cannes.

In the 1980s, Croatians began creating "neo-genre" works which who used Western commercial genres such as horror, thriller, or mystery and implemented it in late-communist societal settings. The most famous director of that trend is Zoran Tadić, especially with his metaphysical, black-and-white thriller Ritam zločina (Rhythm of the Crime, 1981), and horror movie Treći kljuć (The Third Key, 1983), which examines corruption through kafkaesque metaphor.

=== 1990s: period of crisis ===
When Croatia became independent in the 1990s, Croatian film suffered a difficult crisis. Due to the wars, the market for Croatian films shrank, most of the theatres disappeared for good and no Croatian films could expect to be financially viable without even greater support from the state. In the period of the rule of Franjo Tuđman, the government avoided direct censorship, but demanded more nationalistic content, making it less accessible not only to audiences in other countries, but also to Croatians.

=== Croatian Film Today: Third Golden Era ===
After the political changes in 2000, Croatian cinema began to work in a completely free environment for the first time. As a result, critics at the beginning of this decade argued that Croatian cinema flourished in a "third golden era" (after the 1950s and 1960s). One of the most popular directors in the contemporary Croatian cinema is Vinko Brešan whose comedies Kako je počeo rat na mom otoku (How the War Started on My Island, 1997), and Maršal (Marshal Tito's Spirit, 1999) mix grotesque humor and political provocation. Brešan's war drama Svjedoci (Witnesses), based on a novel by Jurica Pavičić, was the first feature film from countries of former Yugoslavia which depicted Yugoslavian war crimes. Svjedoci was screened in competition at the Berlin Film Festival in 2003. A Wonderful Night in Split (Ta divna splitska noć, 2004) by Arsen A. Ostojić received a nomination for the European Discovery EFA award, and Tu (Here, 2003) by Zrinko Ogresta was awarded at the Karlovy Vary Film Festival. Among other distinguished contemporary directors, internationally most recognized is Ognjen Sviličić, whose two films premiered at the Berlin Film Festival - Oprosti za kung fu (Sorry about Kung Fu, 2004) and Armin (2006). Armin was also Croatia's submission for the 2008 Academy Award, and although it did not earn a nomination in the Best Foreign Language Film category, it did nevertheless receive the prestigious Best Foreign Film of 2007 Award given by the International Federation of Film Critics.

Croatian cinema produces between five and ten feature films per year. The Ministry of Culture and Media also cofinances approximately 60 minutes of animation per year, plus documentaries and experimental films which have a bigger cultural prestige in Croatia then in other countries of former Yugoslavia. National cinema attendances average at 2.7 million tickets bought by a population of around 4.5 million.

=== Animation ===
The history of animation in Croatia begins with two short animated commercials by Sergej Tagatz in 1922 as a part of Jadran Film. This was followed by animations produced by Dom narodnog zdravlja such as Ivin zub (Ivo's Tooth), Macin nos (Kitty's Nose), all of which were directed by Milan Marijanović and drawn by Petar Papp in 1928. In 1929, the first completely animated short was made, entitled Martin u nebo, martin iz neba.

==== Zagreb School ====
Zagreb has its own animation film school, Zagrebačka škola crtanog filma (Zagreb Cartoon School). It was given that name at the Cannes Film Festival in 1959, when eight Zagreb cartoons were screened, and the French film historian Georges Sadoul first time named l'école de Zagreb (Zagreb School). The school was based on the production company Zagreb Film, famous for its symbol - a little horse. The most notable member of school (which was never a school in a proper, educational sense) was Montenegro-born author Dušan Vukotić, winner of the 1963 Oscar for his animated short Surogat. He was the first non-American to win the Oscar for animated film. Other important members were Vatroslav Mimica (later a feature filmmaker), and Vlado Kristl, who left Croatia in the early 1960s after the banning of his avant-garde, experimental cartoon Don Kihot (Don Quixote). The Zagreb school was revolutionary for the animations of the 1950s, because it abandoned the Disney-like cartoon style, and introduced visual elements of avant-garde abstract painting, constructivism and cubism.

A failure of the school was that it never experimented with other animation techniques than cartoons. Also, it never reached level of proper industry, remaining more like an artistic workshop. The Zagreb school was lively and successful during the 1960s and early 1970s, but after that Croatian animation faded and today it does not have the global role it used to have.

== Croats in world cinema ==
Many Croats have participated in world cinema, including actor-director Rade Šerbedžija, actor Goran Višnjić, producer Branko Lustig, and actress Mira Furlan. Furthermore, John Malkovich and Eric Bana are of Croatian ancestry.

== Croatian film festivals ==
- Pula Film Festival
- Motovun Film Festival
- Zagreb Film Festival
- ZagrebDox
- Split Film Festival
- Star Film Fest Sisak

== See also ==
- List of Croatian films
- Croatian Film Archive
- Cinema of the world
- World cinema
