= Independent State of Croatia =

1941–1945 puppet state of Germany and Italy

Independent State of Croatia Nezavisna Država Hrvatska
- 1941–1945
- Flag Coat of arms
- Motto: "Za dom spremni" "For the home—Ready!"
- Anthem: Lijepa naša domovino "Our Beautiful Homeland"
- Territories claimed and controlled by the Independent State of Croatia in 1943 (dark green); Territories claimed by the Independent State of Croatia and controlled by the Yugoslav Partisans in 1943 (light green)
- Status: Puppet state
- Capital and largest city: Zagreb; 45°48′47″N 15°58′39″E
- Official languages: Croatian
- Writing system: Latin
- Religion: State religions: ~56.2% Roman Catholicism; 11.1% Islam; Unknown number Croatian Orthodox; Other religions: 30.6% Serbian Orthodox; 0.6% Judaism; ~1.5% other
- Demonym: Croatian
- Government: Fascist one-party dictatorship (1941–1945) under a constitutional monarchy (1941–1943) (Note: Aimone, Duke of Spoleto, accepted nomination on 18 May 1941 as "Tomislav II", abdicated 31 July 1943 and renounced all claims on 12 October 1943. Subsequently, the state was no longer a technical monarchy. Ante Pavelić became head of state, and his title as leader of the ruling Ustaše movement, Poglavnik, officially became the title of the NDH head of state.)
- King
  - 1941–1943: Tomislav II
- Poglavnik
  - 1941–1945: Ante Pavelić
- Prime Minister
  - 1941–1943: Ante Pavelić
  - 1943–1945: Nikola Mandić
- Historical era: World War II
  - State proclaimed: 10 April 1941
  - Treaties of Rome: 18 May 1941
  - Tripartite Pact: 15 June 1941
  - Dalmatia annexed: 10 September 1943
  - Lorković–Vokić plot: 30 August 1944
  - Government dissolved: 8 May 1945
  - Armed Forces surrender: 15 May 1945
  - Battle of Odžak: 25 May 1945

Area
- 1941: 115,133 km^{2} (44,453 sq mi)

Population
  - 1941: 6,500,000
- Currency: NDH Kuna
Preceded by	Succeeded by
1941: Kingdom of Yugoslavia; 1943: Governorate of Dalmatia	1941: Govenornate of Dalmatia; Democratic Federal Yugoslavia
- Today part of: Bosnia and Herzegovina; Croatia; Serbia; Slovenia

The Independent State of Croatia (Croatian: Nezavisna Država Hrvatska, NDH) (Note: German: unabhängiger Staat Kroatien Italian: Stato indipendente di Croazia) was a World War II–era quasi-state. It was a protectorate of Fascist Italy from 1941 to 1943, and a puppet state of Nazi Germany from 1941 to 1945. It was established in parts of occupied Yugoslavia on 10 April 1941, after the invasion of the country by the Axis powers. Its territory consisted mostly of modern-day Croatia and Bosnia and Herzegovina, as well as some parts of modern-day Serbia and Slovenia, but also excluded many Croat-populated areas in Dalmatia, Istria, and Međimurje.

During its entire existence, the NDH was governed as a one-party state by the fascist Ustaše organization under its Poglavnik, Ante Pavelić. (Note: "Poglavnik" was coined by the Ustaše and originally a title for the movement's leader. In 1941 it was institutionalized in the NDH as the title of first the Prime Minister (1941–1943), and then the head of state (1943–1945). It was at all times held by Ante Pavelić (1889–1959) and became synonymous with him. The translation of the term varies. The root of the word is the Croatian word "glava", meaning "head" ("Po-glav(a)-nik"). The more literal translation is "head-man", while "leader" captures more of the meaning of the term (in relation to the German "Führer" and Italian "Duce").) The regime targeted Serbs, Jews and Roma as part of a large-scale campaign of genocide, as well as anti-fascist or dissident Croats and Bosnian Muslims. The NDH was considered Germany's closest regional ally with strong ideological alignment. Out of the 22 concentration camps in NDH-controlled territory, Jasenovac was the largest while Jastrebarsko and Sisak held only children.

From the signing of the Treaties of Rome on 18 May 1941 until the Italian capitulation on 8 September 1943, the state was a territorial condominium of Germany and Italy. As Pavelić came to power alongside the Ustaše, German Führer Adolf Hitler and Italian Duce Benito Mussolini resourced and provided political power to the NDH. In its judgement in the Hostages Trial, the Nuremberg Military Tribunal concluded that NDH was not a sovereign state. According to the Tribunal, "Croatia was at all times here involved an occupied country".

== History ==
=== Influences on the rise of the Ustaše ===
In 1915 a group of political emigres from Austria-Hungary, predominantly Croats but including some Serbs and a Slovene, formed themselves into a Yugoslav Committee, with a view to creating a South Slav state in the aftermath of World War I. They saw this as a way to prevent Dalmatia being ceded to Italy under the Treaty of London (1915). In 1918, the National Council of Slovenes, Croats and Serbs sent a delegation to the Serbian monarch to offer unification of the State of Slovenes, Croats and Serbs with the Kingdom of Serbia. The leader of the Croatian Peasant Party, Stjepan Radić, warned on their departure for Belgrade that the council had no democratic legitimacy. But a new state, the Kingdom of Serbs, Croats and Slovenes, was duly proclaimed on 1 December 1918, with no heed taken of legal protocols such as the signing of a new Pacta conventa in recognition of historic Croatian state rights.

Croats were at the outset politically disadvantaged with the centralized political structure of the kingdom, which was seen as favouring the Serb majority. The political situation of the Kingdom of Serbs, Croats, and Slovenes was fractious and violent. In 1927, the Independent Democratic Party, which represented the Serbs of Croatia, turned its back on the centralist policy of King Alexander and entered into a coalition with the Croatian Peasant Party.

On 20 June 1928, Stjepan Radić and four other Croat deputies were shot while in the Belgrade parliament by a member of the Serbian People's Radical Party. Three of the deputies, including Radić, died. The outrage that resulted from the assassination of Stjepan Radić threatened to destabilise the kingdom. In January 1929, King Alexander responded by proclaiming a royal dictatorship, under which all dissenting political activity was banned and the state was renamed the "Kingdom of Yugoslavia". The Ustaša was created in principle in 1929.

One consequence of Alexander's 1929 proclamation and the repression and persecution of Croatian nationalists was a rise of support for the Croatian extreme nationalist, Ante Pavelić, who had been a Zagreb deputy in the Yugoslav parliament, He was later implicated in Alexander's assassination in 1934, went into exile in Italy and gained support for his vision of liberating Croatia from Serb control and racially "purifying" Croatia. While residing in Italy, Pavelić and other Croatian exiles planned the Ustaša insurgency.

=== Establishment of the NDH ===
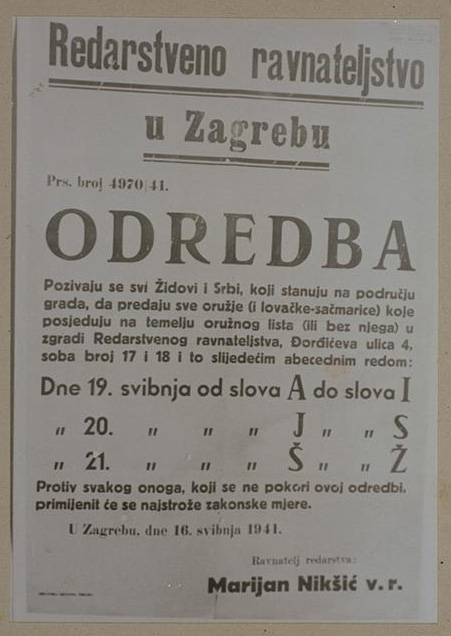
Message calling on Jews and Serbs to surrender their weapons at the risk of being severely condemned

Following the attack of the Axis powers on the Kingdom of Yugoslavia in 1941, and the quick defeat of the Royal Yugoslav Army (Jugoslavenska Vojska), the country was occupied by Axis forces. The Axis powers offered Vladko Maček the opportunity to form a government, since Maček and his party, the Croatian Peasant Party (Croatian: Hrvatska seljačka stranka – HSS) had the greatest electoral support among Yugoslavia's Croats – but Maček refused that offer.

On 10 April 1941 the German army took control in Zagreb. With their support, retired lieutenant-colonel Slavko Kvaternik, deputy leader of the Ustaše, declared the creation of the Independent State of Croatia (Nezavisna Država Hrvatska – NDH) "in the name of Croats and the header [sic] (poglavnik) Ante Pavelić". A few days later on 15 April 1941, Ante Pavelić returned to Zagreb from exile in Italy, and on 16 April 1941 he took power as the State Leader, or the "Leader" (Poglavnik), holding the office of prime minister.

Acceding to the demands of Benito Mussolini and the Fascist regime in the Kingdom of Italy, Pavelić reluctantly accepted Aimone the 4th Duke of Aosta as a figurehead King of the NDH under his new royal name, Tomislav II. Aosta was not interested in being the figurehead King of Croatia: Upon learning he had been named King of Croatia, he told close colleagues that he thought his nomination was a bad joke by his cousin King Victor Emmanuel III though he accepted the crown out of a sense of duty. He never visited the NDH and had no influence over the government, which was dominated by Pavelić.

From a strategic perspective, the establishment of the NDH was an attempt by Mussolini and Hitler to pacify the Croats, while reducing the use of Axis resources, which were more urgently needed for Operation Barbarossa. Meanwhile, Mussolini used his long-established support for Croatian independence as leverage to coerce Pavelić into signing an agreement on 18 May 1941 at 12:30, under which central Dalmatia and parts of Hrvatsko primorje and Gorski kotar were ceded to Italy.

Under the same agreement, the NDH was restricted to a minimal navy and Italian forces were granted military control of the entire Croatian coastline. After Pavelić signed the agreement, other Croatian politicians rebuked him. Pavelić publicly defended the decision and thanked Germany and Italy for supporting Croatian independence. After refusing leadership of the NDH, Maček called on all to obey and cooperate with the new government. The Roman Catholic Church was also openly supportive of the government. According to Maček, the new state was greeted with a "wave of enthusiasm" in Zagreb, often by people "blinded and intoxicated" by the fact that the Nazi Germany had "gift-wrapped their occupation under the euphemistic title of 'Independent State of Croatia'." But in the villages, Maček wrote, the peasantry believed that "their struggle over the past 30 years to become masters of their homes and their country had suffered a tremendous setback".

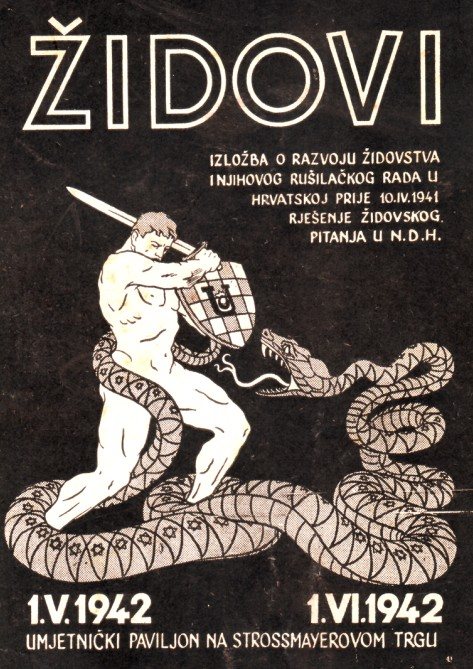
An antisemitic poster in Zagreb, advertising an exhibition about the "destructive work of the Jews in Croatia" and the "solution to the Jewish question in the NDH."

On 16 August 1941, the Ustaše Surveillance Service was established, consisting of four departments, the Ustasha Police, the Ustasha Intelligence Service, Ustasha Defense, and Personnel, for the suppression of activities against the Ustasha, the Independent State of Croatia, and the Croatian people. The Service was eliminated as a separate agency in January 1943 and functions were transferred to the Ministry of Interior under the Directorate of Public Order. Dissatisfied with the Pavelić regime in its early months, the Axis Powers in September 1941 asked Maček to take over, but Maček again refused. Perceiving Maček as a potential rival, Pavelić subsequently had him arrested and interned in the Jasenovac concentration camp. The Ustaše initially did not have an army or administration capable of controlling all the territory of the NDH. The Ustaše movement had fewer than 12,000 members when the war started. While the Ustaše's own estimates put the number of their sympathizers even in the early phase at around 40,000.

To act against Serbs and Jews with genocidal measures, the Ustase introduced widespread measures that Croats themselves were victim to. Jozo Tomasevich in his book, War and Revolution in Yugoslavia: 1941–1945, states, "never before in history had Croats been exposed to such legalized administrative, police and judicial brutality and abuse as during the Ustasha regime." Decrees enacted by the regime allowed it to get rid of all 'unwanted' employees in state and local government and in state enterprises. The 'unwanted' (being all Jews, Serbs, and Yugoslav-oriented Croats) were all thrown out except for some deemed specifically needed by the government. This left a multitude of jobs to be filled by Ustashas and pro-Ustasha adherents and led to government jobs being filled by people with no professional qualifications.

=== Italian influence ===
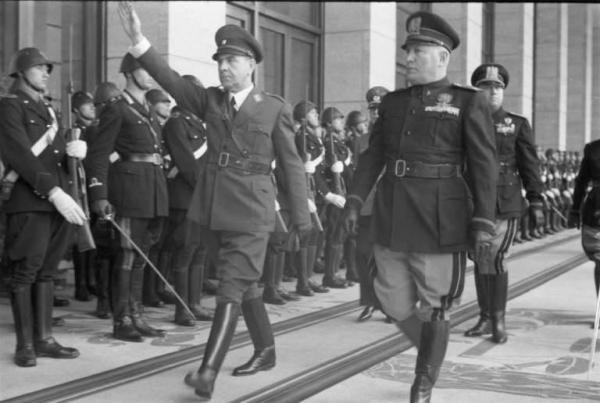
Poglavnik Ante Pavelic (left) with Italy's Duce Benito Mussolini (right) in Rome, Italy on 18 May 1941, during the ceremony of Italy's recognition of Croatia as a sovereign state under official Italian protection, and to agree upon Croatia's borders with Italy

Mussolini and Ante Pavelić had close relations prior to the war. Mussolini and Pavelić both despised the Kingdom of Yugoslavia. Italy had been promised, in the Treaty of London (1915), that it would receive Dalmatia from Austria-Hungary at the end of World War I. The peace negotiations in 1919, however, influenced by the Fourteen Points proclaimed by US President Woodrow Wilson (1856–1924), called for national self-determination and determined that the Yugoslavs rightfully deserved the territory in question. Italian nationalists were enraged. Italian nationalist Gabriele D'Annunzio raided Fiume (which held a mixed population of Croats and Italians) and proclaimed it part of the Italian Regency of Carnaro. D'Annunzio declared himself "Duce" of Carnaro and his blackshirted revolutionaries held control over the town. D'Annunzio was known for engaging in passionate speeches aimed to draw Croatian nationalists to support his actions and to oppose Yugoslavia.

Croatian nationalists, such as Pavelić, opposed the border changes that occurred after World War I. Not only was D'Annunzio's symbolism copied by Mussolini but also D'Annunzio's appeal to Croatian support for the dismantling of Yugoslavia, as a foreign policy approach to Yugoslavia by Mussolini. Pavelić had been in negotiations with Italy since 1927 that included advocating a territory-for-sovereignty swap in which he would tolerate Italy annexing its claimed territory in Dalmatia in exchange for Italy supporting the sovereignty of an independent Croatia.

In the 1930s, upon Pavelić and the Ustaše being forced into exile by the Yugoslav government, they were offered sanctuary in Italy by Mussolini, who allowed them to use training grounds to prepare for war against Yugoslavia. In exchange for this support, Mussolini demanded that Pavelić agree that Dalmatia would become part of Italy if Italy and the Ustaše successfully waged war on Yugoslavia. Although Dalmatia was a largely Croat-populated territory, it had been part of various Italian states, such as the Roman Empire and the Republic of Venice in prior centuries and was part of Italian nationalism's irredentist claims.

In exchange for this concession, Mussolini offered Pavelić the right for Croatia to annex all of Bosnia and Herzegovina, which had only a minority Croat population. Pavelić agreed. After the invasion and occupation of Yugoslavia, Italy annexed numerous Adriatic islands and a portion of Dalmatia, which all combined to become the Italian Governorship of Dalmatia including territory from the provinces of Split, Zadar, and Kotor.

Although Italy had initially larger territorial aims that extended from the Velebit mountains to the Albanian Alps, Mussolini decided against annexing further territories due to a number of factors, including that Italy held the economically valuable portion of that territory within its possession while the northern Adriatic coast had no important railways or roads and because a larger annexation would have included hundreds of thousands of Slavs who were hostile to Italy, within its national borders.

Italy intended to keep the NDH within its sphere of influence by forbidding it to build any significant navy. Italy only permitted small patrol boats to be used by NDH forces. This policy forbidding the creation of NDH warships was part of the Italian Fascists' policy of Mare Nostrum (Latin for "Our Sea") in which Italy was to dominate the Mediterranean Sea as the Roman Empire had done centuries earlier. Italian armed forces assisted the Ustaše government in persecuting Serbs. In 1941, Italian forces captured and interned the Serbian Orthodox Bishop Irinej (Đorđević) of Dalmatia.

In 1942, Germany suggested Italy take military control of all of Croatia out of a desire to redirect German troops from Croatia to the Eastern Front. Italy, however, rejected the offer as it did not believe that it could on its own handle the unstable situation in the Balkans. After the ousting of Mussolini and the Kingdom of Italy's armistice with the Allies, Tomislav II abdicated from his Croatian throne: the NDH on 10 September 1943 declared that the Treaties of Rome were null and void and annexed the portion of Dalmatia that had been ceded to Italy. The NDH attempted to annex Zara (modern-day Zadar, Croatia), which had been a recognized territory of Italy since 1920 and long an object of Croatian irredentism, but Germany did not allow it.

=== Influence of Nazi Germany ===
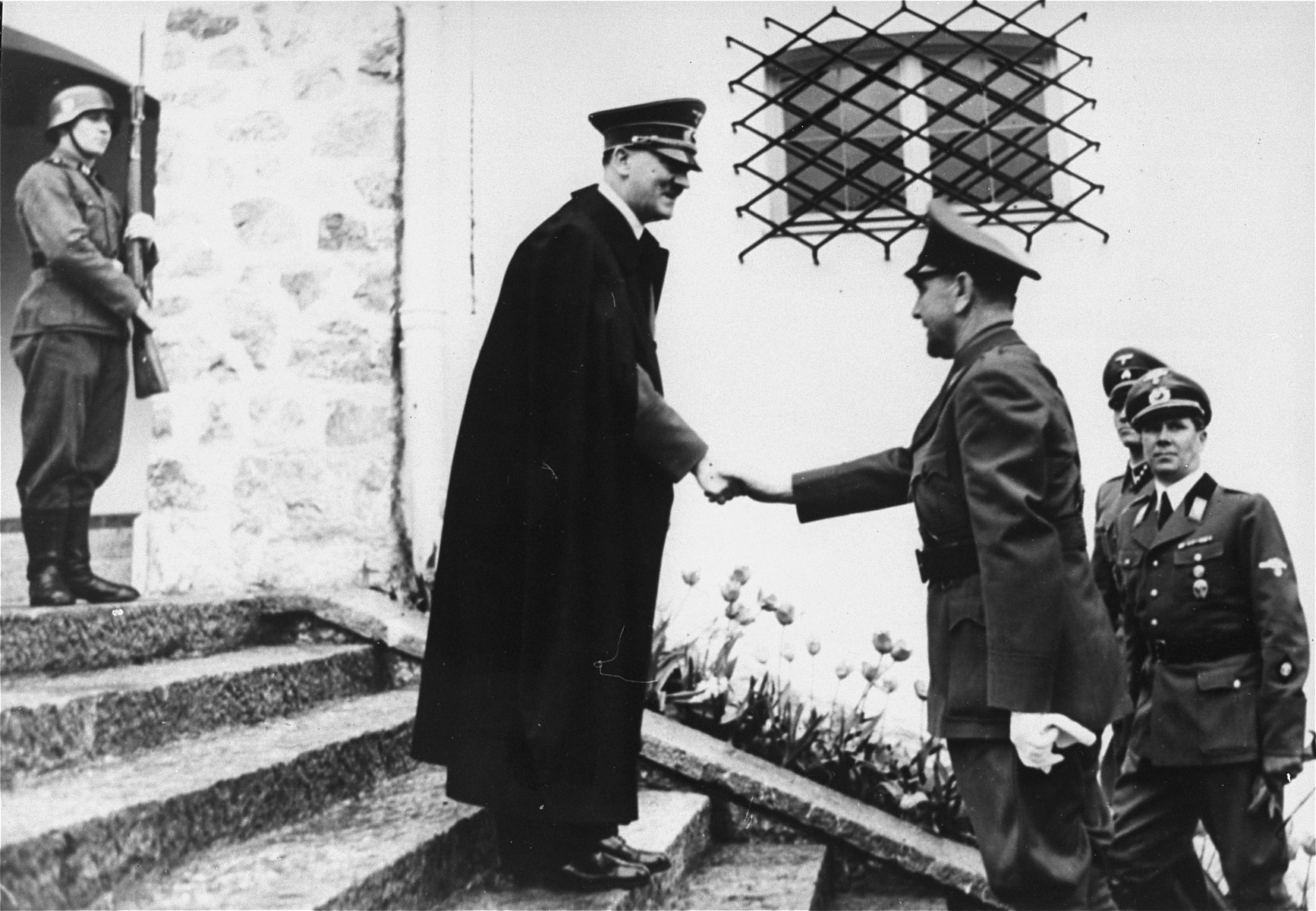
Adolf Hitler (left) with Ante Pavelić (right) at the Berghof, outside the Berchtesgaden, Germany

At the time of the invasion of Yugoslavia by Nazi Germany, Adolf Hitler was uneasy with Mussolini's agenda of creating a puppet Croatian state, and preferred that areas outside of Italian territorial aims become part of Hungary as an autonomous territory. This would appease Nazi Germany's ally Hungary and its nationalist territorial claims. Germany's position on Croatia changed after its invasion of Yugoslavia in 1941. The invasion was spearheaded by a strong German invasion force which was largely responsible for the capture of Yugoslavia. Military forces from other Axis powers, included Italy, Hungary, and Bulgaria.

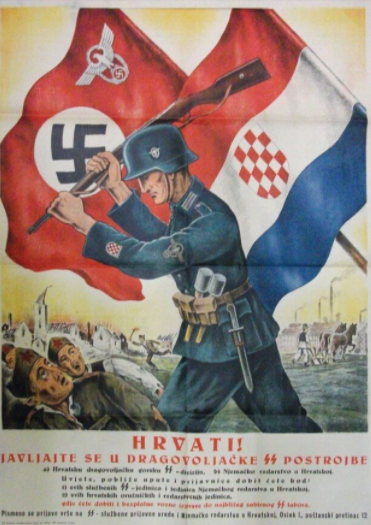
Schutzstaffel (SS) recruitment propaganda poster used in the NDH

The invasion was precipitated by the need for German forces to reach Greece to save Italian forces, which were failing on the battlefield against the Greek armed forces. Upon rescuing Italian forces in Greece and having conquered Yugoslavia and Greece almost single-handedly, Hitler became frustrated with Mussolini and Italy's military incompetence. Germany improved relations with the Ustaše and supported the NDH claims to annex the Adriatic Coast in order reduce Italy's planned territorial gains. Nevertheless, Italy annexed a significant central portion of Dalmatia and various Adriatic Islands. This was not what had been agreed with Pavelić prior to the invasion; Italy had expected to annex all of Dalmatia as part of its irredentist claims.

Hitler sparred with his army commanders over what policy should be undertaken in Croatia regarding the Serbs. German military officials thought that Serbs could be rallied to fight against the Partisans. Hitler disagreed with his commanders, but pointed out to Pavelić that the NDH could create a completely Croat state only if it followed a constant policy of persecution of the non-Croat population for at least fifty years. The NDH was never fully sovereign, but it was a puppet state that enjoyed greater autonomy than any other regime in German-occupied Europe.

As early as 10 July 1941, Wehrmacht General Edmund Glaise von Horstenau reported the following to the German High Command, the Oberkommando der Wehrmacht (OKW):

Our troops have to be mute witnesses of such events; it does not reflect well on their otherwise high reputation [...] I am frequently told that German occupation troops would finally have to intervene against Ustaše crimes. This may happen eventually. Right now, with the available forces, I could not ask for such action. Ad hoc intervention in individual cases could make the German Army look responsible for countless crimes which it could not prevent in the past.

— General Edmund Glaise von Horstenau, German military attaché in Zagreb

The Gestapo report to Reichsführer SS Heinrich Himmler, dated 17 February 1942, states:

Increased activity of the bands is chiefly due to atrocities carried out by Ustaše units in Croatia against the Orthodox population. The Ustaše committed their deeds in a bestial manner not only against males of conscript age, but especially against helpless old people, women and children. The number of the Orthodox that the Croats have massacred and sadistically tortured to death is about three hundred thousand.

— Gestapo report to Reichsführer SS Heinrich Himmler, 17 February 1942.

According to reports by General Glaise-Horstenau, Hitler was angry with Pavelić, whose policy inflamed the rebellion in Croatia, thwarting any prospect of deploying NDH forces on the Eastern Front. Moreover, Hitler was forced to engage large forces of his own to keep the rebellion in check. For that reason, Hitler summoned Pavelić to his war headquarters in Vinnytsia (Ukraine) on 23 September 1942. Consequently, Pavelić replaced his minister of the Armed Forces, Slavko Kvaternik, with the less zealous Jure Francetić. Kvaternik was sent into exile in Slovakia – along with his son Eugen, who was blamed for the persecution of the Serbs in Croatia. Before meeting Hitler, to appease the public, Pavelić published an "Important Government Announcement" (»Važna obavijest Vlade«), in which he threatened those who were spreading the news "about non-existent threats of disarmament of the Ustashe units by representatives of one foreign power, about the Croatian Army replacement by a foreign army, about the possibility that a foreign power would seize the power in Croatia [...] "

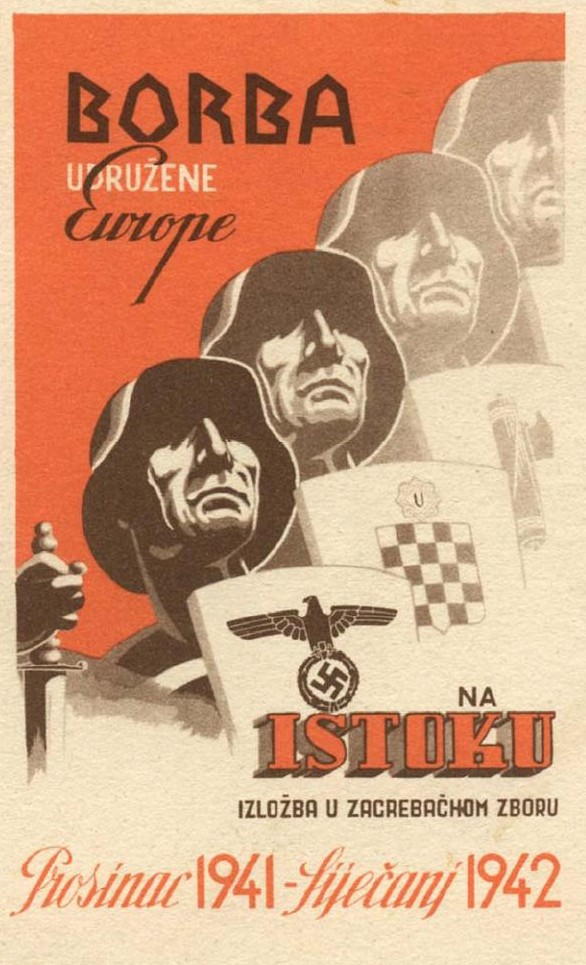
World War II propaganda poster: "The battle of the united Europe in the east"

General Glaise-Horstenau reported: "The Ustaše movement is, due to the mistakes and atrocities they have committed and the corruption, so compromised that the government executive branch (the home guard and the police) shall be separated from the government – even for the price of breaking any possible connection with the government."

Reichsführer-SS Heinrich Himmler is quoted characterizing the Independent State of Croatia as "ridiculous": "our beloved German settlements will be secured. I hope that the area south of Srem will be liberated by [...] the Bosnian division [...] so that we can at least restore partial order in this ridiculous (Croatian) state." The Ustaše gained German support for plans to eliminate the Serb population in Croatia. One plan involved an exchange in 1941 between Germany and the NDH, in which 20,000 Catholic Slovenes would be deported from German-held Slovenia and sent to the NDH where they would be assimilated as Croats. In exchange, 20,000 Serbs would be deported from the NDH and sent to the German-occupied territory of Serbia. On the meeting with Hitler on 6 June 1941 in Salzburg, Pavelić agreed to receive 175,000 deported Slovenes. The agreement provided that the number of Serbs deported from NDH to Serbia could exceed the number of Slovenes received by 30,000. During the talks, Hitler stressed the necessity and desirability of deportations of Slovenes and Serbs, and advised Pavelic that NDH, in order to become stable, should carry on ethnically intolerant policy for the next 50 years. The German occupation forces allowed the expulsion of Serbs to Serbia, but instead of sending the Slovenes to Croatia, they were also deported to Serbia. In total, about 300,000 Serbs had been deported or fled from the NDH to Serbia by the end of World War II.

The atrocities committed by the Ustaše stunned observers; Brigadier Sir Fitzroy Maclean, Chief of the British military mission to the Partisans, commented "Some Ustaše collected the eyes of Serbs they had killed, sending them, when they had enough, to the Poglavnik ['head-man'] for his inspection or proudly displaying them and other human organs in the cafés of Zagreb."

The Nazi regime demanded that the Ustaše adopt antisemitic racial policies, persecute Jews and set up several concentration camps. Pavelic and the Ustaše accepted Nazi demands, but their racial policy focused primarily on eliminating the Serb population. When the Ustaše needed more recruits to help exterminate the Serbs, the state broke away from Nazi antisemitic policy by promising honorary Aryan citizenship, and, thus, freedom from persecution, to Jews who were willing to fight for the NDH. As this was the only legal means allowing Jews to escape persecution, a number of Jews joined the NDH's armed forces. This aggravated the German SS, which claimed that the NDH let 5,000 Jews survive via service in the NDH's armed forces. German anti-Semitic objectives for Croatia were further undermined by Italy's reluctance to adhere to a strict antisemitic policy, which resulted in Jews in Italian-held parts of Croatia avoiding the same persecution facing Jews in German-held eastern Croatia. After Italy abandoned the war in 1943, German forces occupied western Croatia and the NDH annexed the territory ceded to Italy in 1941.

Within just a few days of the creation of the NDH, Croatian workers were requisitioned by the Reich for cheap forced labour and slave labour. From 1942 onward, German and Croat authorities cooperated more closely in deporting "unwanted" Croats and Serbs to concentration camps in the Reich and Norway for forced labour, such people were to be rounded up and deported by the General Plenipotentiary for Labour Deployment to the Reich (Arbeitseinsatz).

Between 1941 and 1945, some 200,000 Croatian citizens of the NDH (including ethnic Croats as well as ethnic Serbs with Croatian nationality and Slovenes) were sent to Germany to work as slave and forced labourers, mostly working in mining, agriculture and forestry. It is estimated that 153,000 of these labourers were said to have been "voluntarily" recruited, however in many instances this was not the case, as the workers that may have initially volunteered were forced to work longer hours and were paid less than their contracts had stipulated, they were also not allowed to return home after their yearly contract had ended, at which point their labour was no longer voluntary, but forced. Forced and slave labour were also conducted in Nazi concentration camps, such as in Buchenwald and Mittelbau-Dora. From 1941 to 1945, 3.8% of the population of Croatia had been sent to the Reich to work, which was higher than the European average.

=== Partisan resistance ===
On 22 June 1941, the Sisak Partisan Detachment was formed in Brezovica forest near Sisak; this was to be celebrated as the first armed resistance unit formed in occupied Yugoslavia during World War II. Croats, Serbs, Bosniaks, and citizens of all nationalities and backgrounds began joining the pan-Yugoslav Partisans led by Josip Broz Tito. The Partisan movement was soon able to control a large percentage of the NDH (and Yugoslavia) and before long the cities of occupied Bosnia and Dalmatia in particular were surrounded by these Partisan-controlled areas, with their garrisons living in a de facto state of siege and constantly trying to maintain control of the rail-links. In 1944, the third year of the war in Yugoslavia, Croats formed 61% of the Partisan operational units originating from the Federal State of Croatia.

The Federal State of Croatia also had the highest number of detachments and brigades among the federal units, and together with the forces in Bosnia and Herzegovina, Partisan resistance in the NDH made up the majority of the movement's military strength.

=== Relations with the Chetniks ===
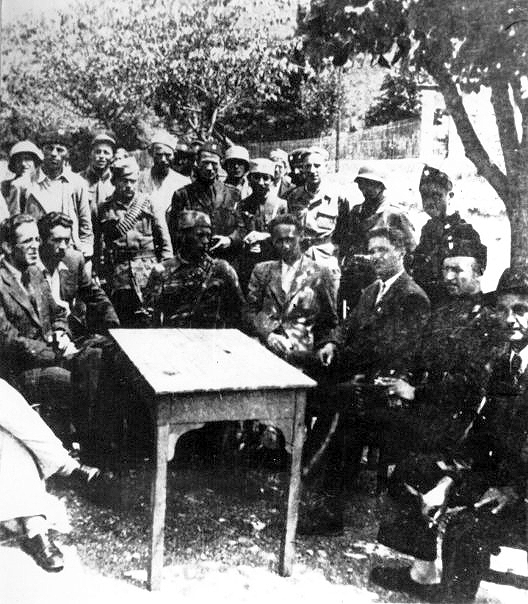
Representatives of the Chetniks, Ustaše, and Croatian Home Guard meet in occupied Bosnia.

After the 1941 split between the Partisans and the Chetniks in Serbia, the Chetnik groups in central, eastern and northwestern Bosnia found themselves caught between the German and Ustaše (NDH) forces on one side and the Partisans on the other. In early 1942 Chetnik Major Jezdimir Dangić approached the Germans in an attempt to arrive at an understanding, but was unsuccessful, and the local Chetnik leaders were forced to look for another solution. Although the Ustaše and Chetniks were rival nationalists (Croatian and Serbian, respectively), they found a common enemy in the Partisans, and thwarting Partisan advances became the overriding reason for the collaboration which ensued between the Ustaše authorities of the Independent State of Croatia and Chetnik detachments in Bosnia.

The first formal agreement between Bosnian Chetniks and the Ustaše was concluded on 28 May 1942, in which Chetnik leaders expressed their loyalty as "citizens of the Independent State of Croatia" both to the state and its Poglavnik (Ante Pavelić). During the next three weeks, three additional agreements were signed, covering a large part of the area of Bosnia (along with the Chetnik detachments within it). By the provision of these agreements, the Chetniks were to cease hostilities against the Ustaše state, and the Ustaše would establish regular administration in these areas. The main provision, Article 5 of the agreement, states as follows:

As long as there is danger from the Partisan armed bands, the Chetnik formations will cooperate voluntarily with the Croatian military in fighting and destroying the Partisans and in those operations they will be under the overall command of the Croatian armed forces. [...] Chetnik formations may engage in operations against the Partisans on their own, but this they will have to report, on time, to the Croatian military commanders.

The necessary ammunition and provisions were supplied to the Chetniks by the Ustaše military. Chetniks who were wounded in such operations would be cared for in NDH hospitals, while the orphans and widows of Chetniks killed in action would be supported by the Ustaše state. Persons specifically recommended by Chetnik commanders would be returned home from the Ustaše concentration camps. These agreements covered the majority of Chetnik forces in Bosnia east of the German-Italian demarcation line, and lasted throughout most of the war. Since Croatian forces were immediately subordinate to the German military occupation, collaboration with Croatian forces was, in fact, indirect collaboration with the Germans.

=== End of the war ===
In August 1944, there was an attempt by the NDH Foreign Minister Mladen Lorković and Minister of War Ante Vokić to execute a coup d'état against Ante Pavelić so as to separate from the Axis and align with the Allies. The Lorković-Vokić coup failed and its conspirators were executed. By early 1945, the NDH army withdrew towards Zagreb with German and Cossack troops. They were overpowered and the advance of Tito's Partisan forces, joined by the Soviet Red Army, caused a mass retreat of the Ustaše towards Austria and effectively an end to the Independent State of Croatia. Pavelić himself, too, fled, even though he had vowed to fight in Zagreb till the bitter end.

In May 1945, a large column composed of NDH Home Guard troops, Ustaša, Cossacks, Serbian State Guard, some Chetniks and the Slovene Home Guard, as well as numerous civilians, retreated from the Partisan forces heading northwest towards Italy and Austria. The German Instrument of Surrender was signed on 8 May, but the Germans put Pavelić in sole command of NDH forces, and he ordered to continue fighting as the columns tried to reach the British forces to negotiate passage into Allied-occupied Austria. The British Army, however, refused them entry and turned them over to the Partisan forces. The Bleiburg repatriations from Austria resulted in mass executions. On 25 May 1945, the final battle of the Second World War in Europe, the Battle of Odžak, ended with the fall of the Independent State of Croatia, whose territory became part of the Democratic Federal Yugoslavia, and the demise of the Independent State of Croatia.

Meanwhile, Pavelić had detached from the group and fled to Austria, Italy, Argentina and finally Spain, where he would die in 1959. Several other members of the NDH government were captured in May and June 1945, and sentenced to death or long-term imprisonment in the trial of Mile Budak. The end of the war resulted in the establishment of the Democratic Republic of Yugoslavia, which later became the Socialist Federal Republic of Yugoslavia, with the Constitution of 1946 officially making the People's Republic of Croatia and the People's Republic of Bosnia and Herzegovina two of the six constituent republics of the new state.

=== Aftermath ===
Although far right movements in Croatia inspired by the former NDH reemerged during the Croatian War of Independence, the current Constitution of Croatia does not officially recognize the Independent State of Croatia as the historical or legitimate predecessor state of the current Croatian republic. Despite this, upon declaring independence from Yugoslavia in 1991, the Republic of Croatia rehabilitated the Croatian Home Guard, whose veterans have since received state pensions. German soldiers who died on Croatian territory were not commemorated until Germany and Croatia reached an agreement on marking their grave sites in 1996. The German War Graves Commission maintains two large cemeteries, in Zagreb and Split.

== Geography ==
Geographically, the NDH encompassed most of modern-day Croatia, all of Bosnia and Herzegovina, part of modern-day Serbia, and a small portion of modern-day Slovenia in the Municipality of Brežice. It bordered Nazi Germany to the north-west, the Kingdom of Hungary to the north-east, the Serbian administration (a joint German-Serb government) to the east, Montenegro (an Italian protectorate) to the south-east and Fascist Italy along its coastal area.

=== Establishment of borders ===
The exact borders of the Independent State of Croatia were unclear when it was established. Approximately one month after its formation, significant areas of Croat-populated territory were ceded to its Axis partners, including the Kingdoms of Hungary and Italy.

- On 13 May 1941, the NDH government signed an agreement with Nazi Germany which demarcated their borders.
- On 18 May, the Treaties of Rome were signed by diplomats of the NDH and Italy. Large parts of Croatian lands were occupied (annexed) by Italy, including most of Dalmatia (including Split and Šibenik), nearly all Croatian Adriatic islands, including Rab, Krk, Vis, Korčula, Mljet, and some smaller areas such as the Bay of Kotor, parts of the Croatian Littoral and parts of Gorski Kotar.
- On 7 June, the NDH government issued a decree that demarcated its eastern border with Serbia.
- On 27 October, the NDH and Italy reached an agreement on the Independent State of Croatia's border with Montenegro.
- On 8 September 1943, Italy capitulated and the NDH officially considered the Treaties of Rome to be void, along with the Treaty of Rapallo of 1920 which had given Italy Istria, Fiume (now Rijeka) and Zara (Zadar).

German foreign minister Joachim von Ribbentrop approved the NDH acquisition of the Dalmatian territories gained by Italy at the time of the Treaties of Rome. By now, most such territory was actually controlled by the Yugoslav Partisans, since the ceding of those areas had made them strongly anti-NDH, with more than one third of the total population of Split being documented to have joined the Partisans. By 11 September 1943, NDH foreign minister Mladen Lorković received word from German consul Siegfried Kasche that the NDH should wait before moving on Istria. Germany's central government had already annexed Istria and Fiume (Rijeka) into the Operational Zone of the Adriatic Littoral a day earlier. Međimurje and southern Baranja were annexed by the Kingdom of Hungary. NDH disputed this and continued to lay claim to both, naming the administrative province centred in Osijek as Great Parish Baranja. This border was never legislated, although Hungary may have considered the pacta conventa to be in effect, which delineated the two nation's borders along the Drava river.

When compared to the republic borders established in the SFR Yugoslavia after the war, the NDH encompassed the whole of Bosnia and Herzegovina, with its non-Croat (Serb and Bosniak) majority, as well as some 20 km^{2} of Slovenia (the villages of Slovenska Vas, Nova Vas pri Mokricah, Jesenice, Obrežje, and Čedem) and the whole of Syrmia (part of which was previously in the Danube Banovina).

=== Zones of influence ===
From 1941 to 1943, territory of the Independent State of Croatia was divided into German and Italian zones, sometimes described as zones of influence and sometimes as occupation zones:

- The German zone, which included the northeastern part of NDH, bordering Hungary in the north, German-occupied Serbia in the east, the Italian zone in the south, and Nazi Germany in the north-west. There, the German armed forces (Wehrmacht) exercised de facto control.
- The Italian zone, which included the southwestern part of the NDH, bordering the German zone in the north-east, Italian-occupied Montenegro in the east, and Yugoslav territories annexed by Italy in the south-west.

After the capitulation of Italy in 1943, the Italian zone of influence was abolished and the German zone of influence was expanded to the whole Independent State of Croatia. At the same time, the NDH acquired control of northern Dalmatia (Split and Šibenik).

== Government and politics ==
Under the Independent State of Croatia all parties but the Ustaše party were banned. The absolute leader of the NDH was Ante Pavelić, who was known by his Ustaše title, Poglavnik, throughout the war, regardless of his official government post. From 1941 to 1943, while the country was a de jure monarchy, Pavelić was its powerful Prime Minister (or "President of the Government"). After the capitulation of Italy, Pavelić became the head of state in the place of Aimone, Duke of Aosta (also known as Tomislav II) and retained the position of Prime Minister until September 1943, when he appointed Nikola Mandić to replace him.

=== Monarchy ===
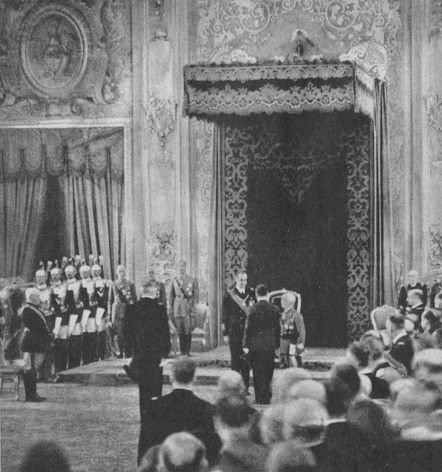
Designation of Aimone Tomislav II as king of Croatia on 18 May 1941. In front of him, Poglavnik Pavelić stands with the Croatian delegation.

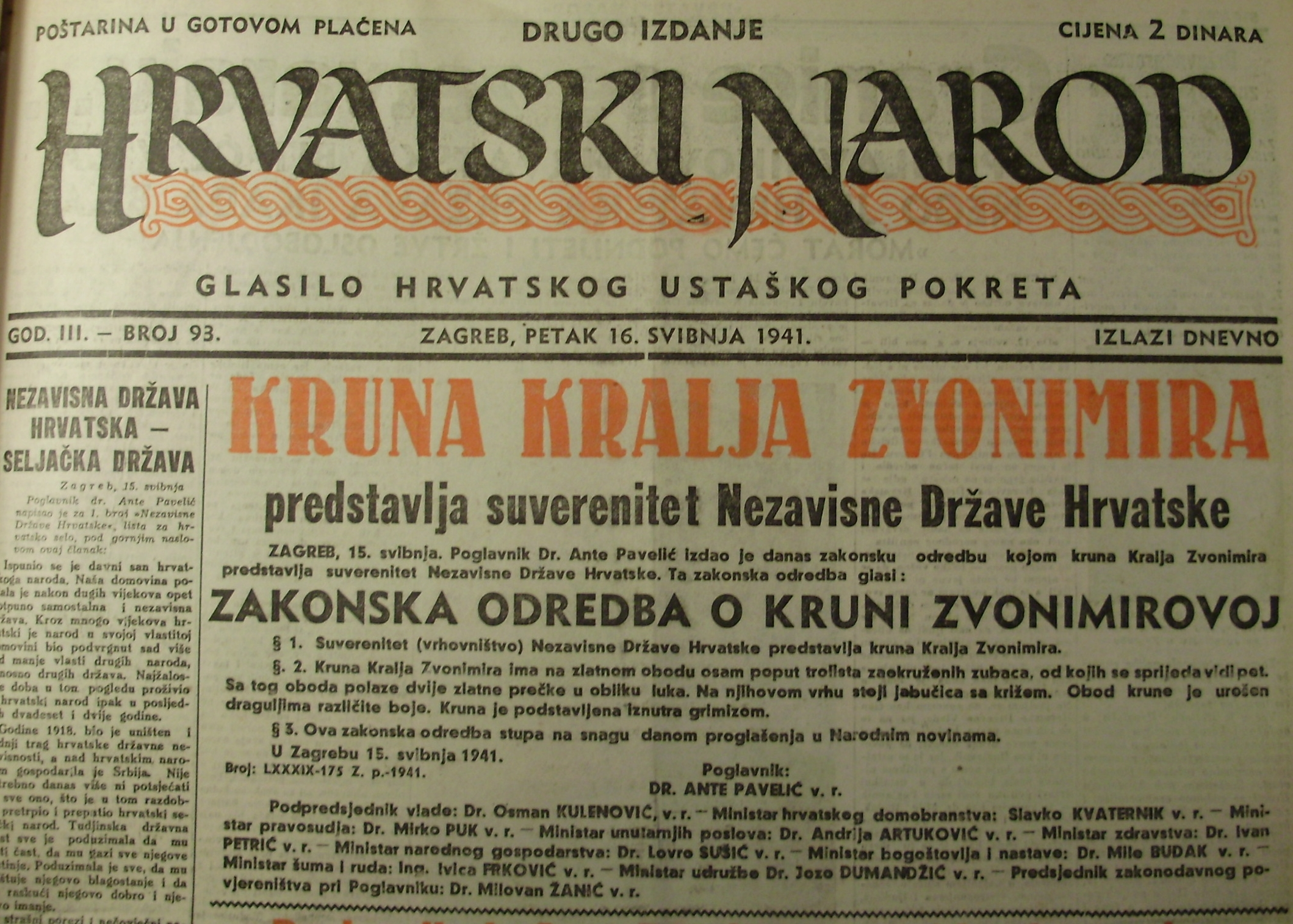
Public declaration of the laws on the crown of Zvonimir, which made the state a kingdom, 15 May 1941

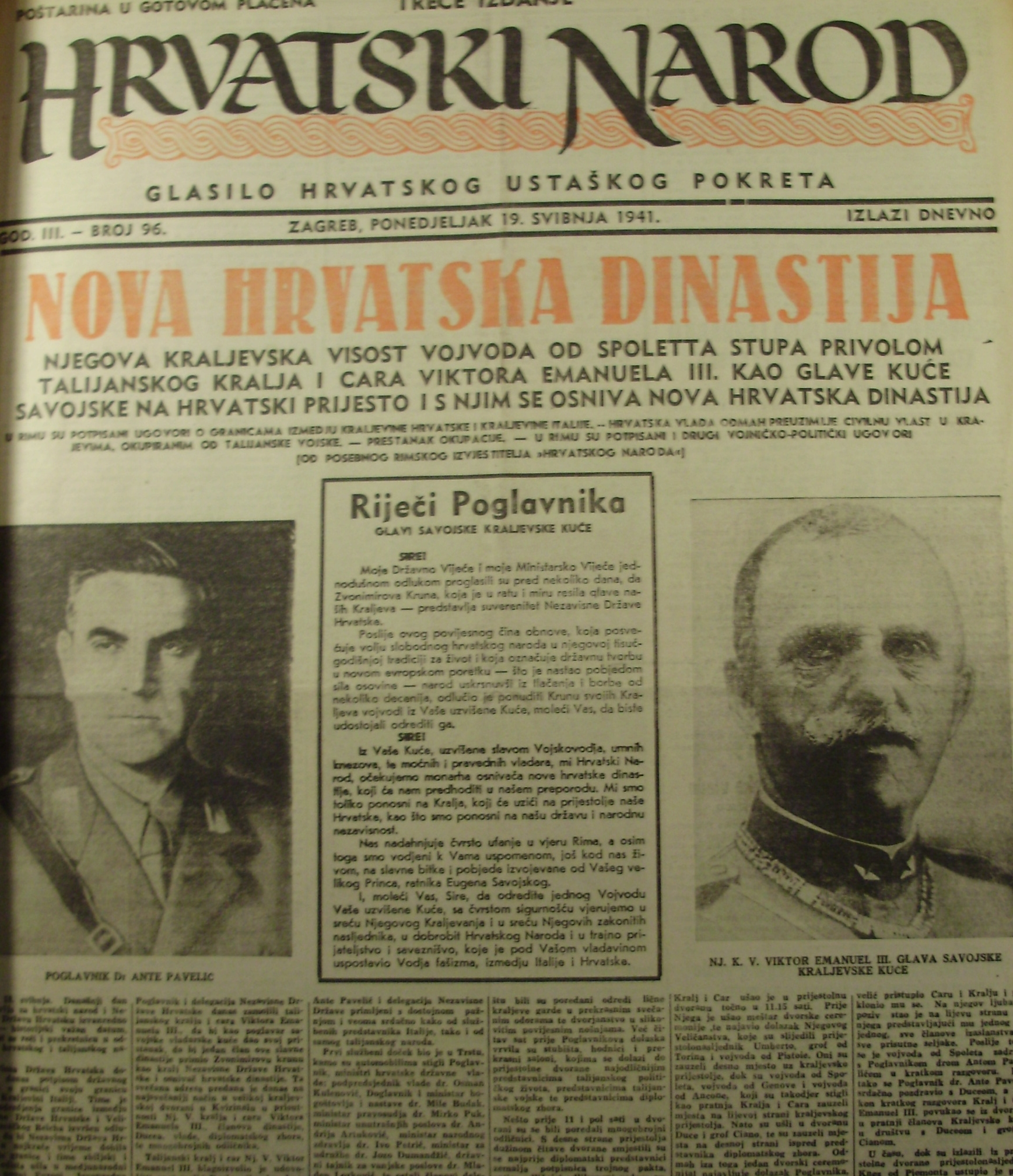
Public proclamation of the new Croatian dynasty (Hrvatski Narod, no. 96, 19 May 1941)

The state was officially a monarchy after the signing of the Laws of the Crown of Zvonimir on 15 May 1941. Prince Aimone, Duke of Aosta, who had been appointed by King Victor Emmanuel III of Italy, initially refused to assume the crown in opposition to the Italian annexation of the Croat-majority populated region of Dalmatia, annexed as part of the Italian irredentist agenda of creating a Mare Nostrum ("Our Sea"). The Duke later briefly accepted the throne due to pressure from Victor Emmanuel III and was titled Tomislav II of Croatia, but never moved from Italy to reside in Croatia.

Upon the formation of the NDH, Pavelić conceded to the accession of Aimone, the 4th Duke of Aosta, as a figurehead King of Croatia under his new royal name, Tomislav II. Tomislav II was not interested in being the figurehead King of Croatia, never actually visited the country and had no influence over the government. In the summer of 1941, Tomislav II declared that he would accept his position as King, only if certain demands were met:

1. that he should be informed about all Italian activities on NDH territory;
2. that his reign should be confirmed by the NDH Croatian State Parliament; and
3. that politics should play no part in the Croatian armed forces.

The demands for German and Italian military departures were obviously impossible to be met by the Italian and German governments, and Tomislav II thus avoided taking up his position in Croatia. Aimone initially refused to assume the crown in opposition to the Italian annexation of the Croat-majority populated region of Dalmatia, however he later accepted the throne upon being pressured to do so by Victor Emmanuel III; however he never moved from Italy to reside in Croatia.

Following the dismissal of Mussolini on 25 July 1943, Tomislav II abdicated on 31 July on the orders of Victor Emmanuel III. Shortly after the armistice with Italy in September 1943, Ante Pavelić declared that Tomislav II was no longer King of Croatia. Tomislav II formally renounced his title, "King of Croatia, Prince of Bosnia and Herzegovina, Voivode of Dalmatia, Tuzla and Knin, Duke of Aosta (from 1942), Prince of Cisterna and of Belriguardo, Marquess of Voghera, and Count of Ponderano", in October 1943 after the birth of his son, Amedeo.

=== Parliament ===
The NDH Parliament was established by the Legal Decree on the Croatian State Parliament on 24 January 1942. The parliamentarians were not elected and meetings were convened just over a dozen times after the initial session in 1942. Its president was Marko Došen. This decree established five categories of individuals who would receive an invitation to be a member of parliament from the Ustaše-appointed government: (1) living Croatian representatives from the Croatian Parliament of 1918, (2) living Croatian representatives elected in the 1938 Yugoslavian election, (3) members of the Party of Rights prior to 1919, (4) certain officials of the Supreme Ustaše Headquarters and (5) two members of the German national assembly. The responsibility for assembling all eligible members of parliament was given to the head of the Supreme Court, Nikola Vukelić, who found 204 people to be eligible. In accordance with the decree, Vukelić ruled that those who had received the position of senator in 1939, had been part of Dušan Simović's government, or had been part of the Yugoslav government-in-exile forfeited their eligibility. Two hundred and four people were declared eligible for the parliament, with 141 actually attending parliamentary meetings. Of the 204 eligible parliament members, 93 were members of the Croatian Peasant Party, 56 of whom attended meetings.

The Parliament was only a deliberatory body and was not empowered to enact legislation. However, during the eighth session of the parliament in February 1942, the Ustaše regime was put on the defensive when a joint Croatian Peasant Party-Croatian Party of Rights motion, supported by 39 members of parliament, questioned about the whereabouts of the Peasant Party's leader Vladko Maček. The following session, Ante Pavelić responded that Maček was being kept in isolation to prevent him from coming into contact with Yugoslav government officials. In less than a month, Maček was moved from the Jasenovac concentration camp and put on house arrest at his property in Kupinec. Maček was later called upon by foreigners to take a stand and counteract the Pavelić government, but he refused. Maček fled the country in 1945, with the help of Ustaše General Ante Moškov. After its February 1942 session, the Parliament met only a few more times, and the decree was not renewed in 1943.

=== Court system ===
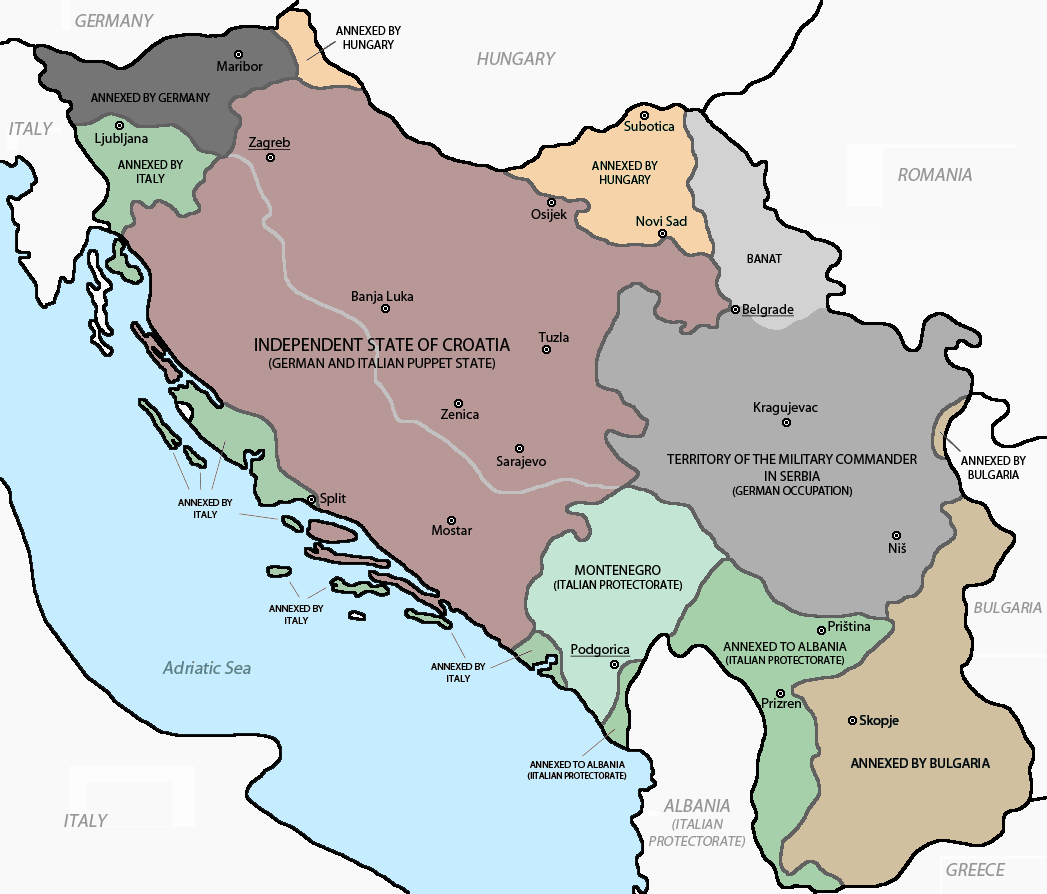
Occupation and partition of Yugoslavia, 1941–1943

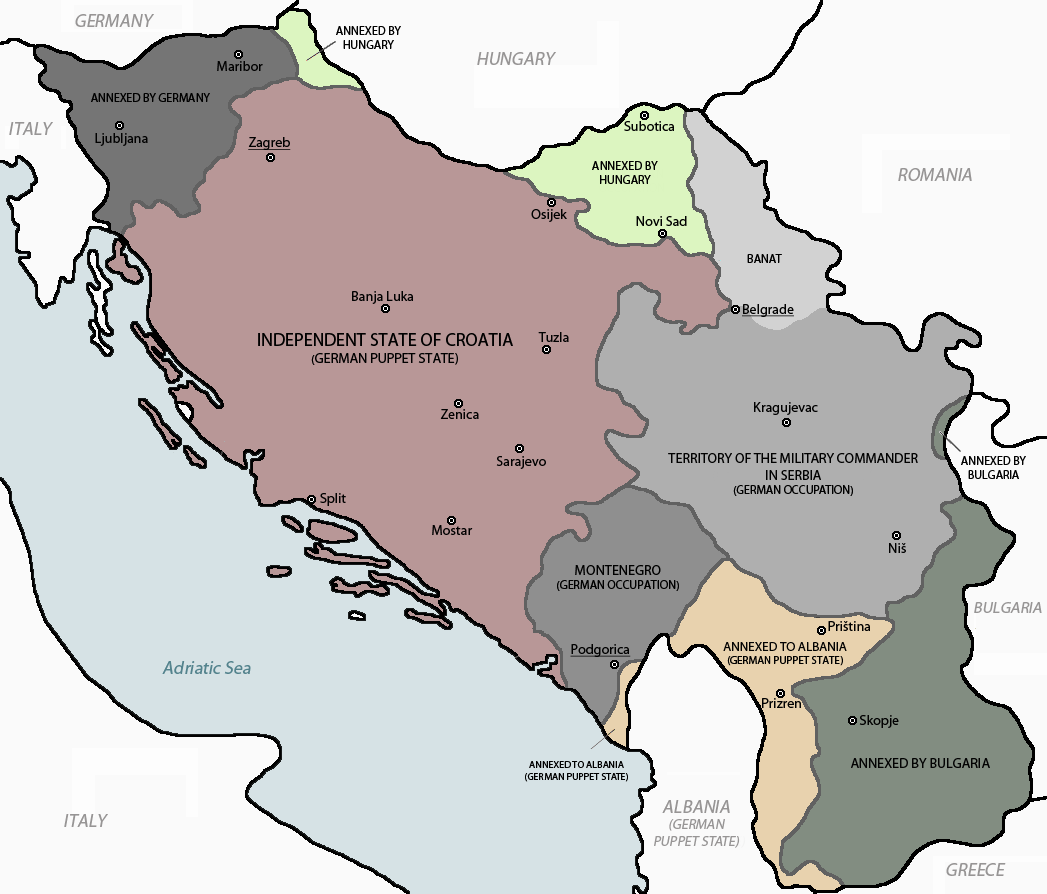
Occupation and partition of Yugoslavia, 1943–1944

The NDH retained the court system of the Kingdom of Yugoslavia, but restored the courts' names to their original forms. The state had 172 local courts (kotar), 19 district courts (judicial tables), an administrative court and an appellate court (Ban's Table) in both Zagreb and Sarajevo, as well as a supreme court (Table of Seven) in Zagreb and a supreme court in Sarajevo. The state maintained men's penitentiaries in Lepoglava, Hrvatska Mitrovica, Stara Gradiška and Zenica, and a women's penitentiary in Zagreb.

=== Foreign relations ===
The NDH was granted full recognition by the Axis Powers and by countries under Axis occupation, it was also recognized by Spain. The state maintained diplomatic missions in several countries, all in Europe. The countries that maintained embassies in Zagreb were Nazi Germany, Italy, Tiso's Slovakia, Hungary, Romania, Bulgaria, Finland, Spain, and Japan. There were also consulates of Italy, Sweden, Switzerland, Denmark, Portugal, Argentina and Vichy France. Despite fears by the Yugoslav government-in-exile that the Soviet Union would establish diplomatic relations with the NDH after it broke diplomatic ties with Yugoslavia, full recognition by the Soviet Union never came to fruition.

In 1941, the country was admitted to the Universal Postal Union. On 10 August 1942 an agreement was signed at Brijuni which re-established the Society of Railways Danube-Sava-Adriatic between the Independent State of Croatia, Germany, Hungary and Italy. After the 11 December 1941 German declaration of war against the United States, the Independent State of Croatia declared war on the United States and the United Kingdom on 14 December. The Croatian Red Cross was established in 1941, with Kurt Hühn serving as its president. The NDH signed the Geneva Conventions on 20 January 1943, after which the International Committee of the Red Cross named Julius Schmidlin as its representative to the country.

=== Administrative divisions ===
The Independent State of Croatia had four levels of administrative divisions: great parishes (velike župe), districts (kotari), cities (gradovi) and municipalities (opcine). At the time of its foundation, the state had 22 great parishes, 142 districts, 31 cities and 1006 municipalities.

The highest level of administration were the great parishes (Velike župe), each of which was headed by a Grand Župan. After the capitulation of Italy, NDH were permitted by the Germans to annex parts of the areas of Yugoslavia previously occupied by Italy. To accommodate this, parish boundaries were changed and the new parish of Sidraga-Ravni Kotari was created. In addition, on 29 October 1943, the Kommissariat of Sušak-Krk (Croatian: Građanska Sušak-Rijeka) was created separately by the Germans to act as a buffer zone between the NDH and RSI in the Fiume area to "perceive the special interests of the local population against the [I]talians"

1	Baranja
2	Bilogora
3a	Bribir-Sidraga
3b	Bribir
4	Cetina
5	Dubrava
6a	Gora
6b	Gora-Zagorje
7	Hum

8	Krbava-Psat
9a	Lašva-Glaž
9b	Lašva-Pliva
10	Lika-Gacka
11	Livac-Zapolje
12	Modruš
13	Pliva-Rama
14	Pokupje
15	Posavje

16	Prigorje
17	Sana-Luka
18	Usora-Soli
19	Vinodol-Podgorje
20	Vrhbosna
21	Vuka
22	Zagorje
23	Sidraga-Ravni Kotari

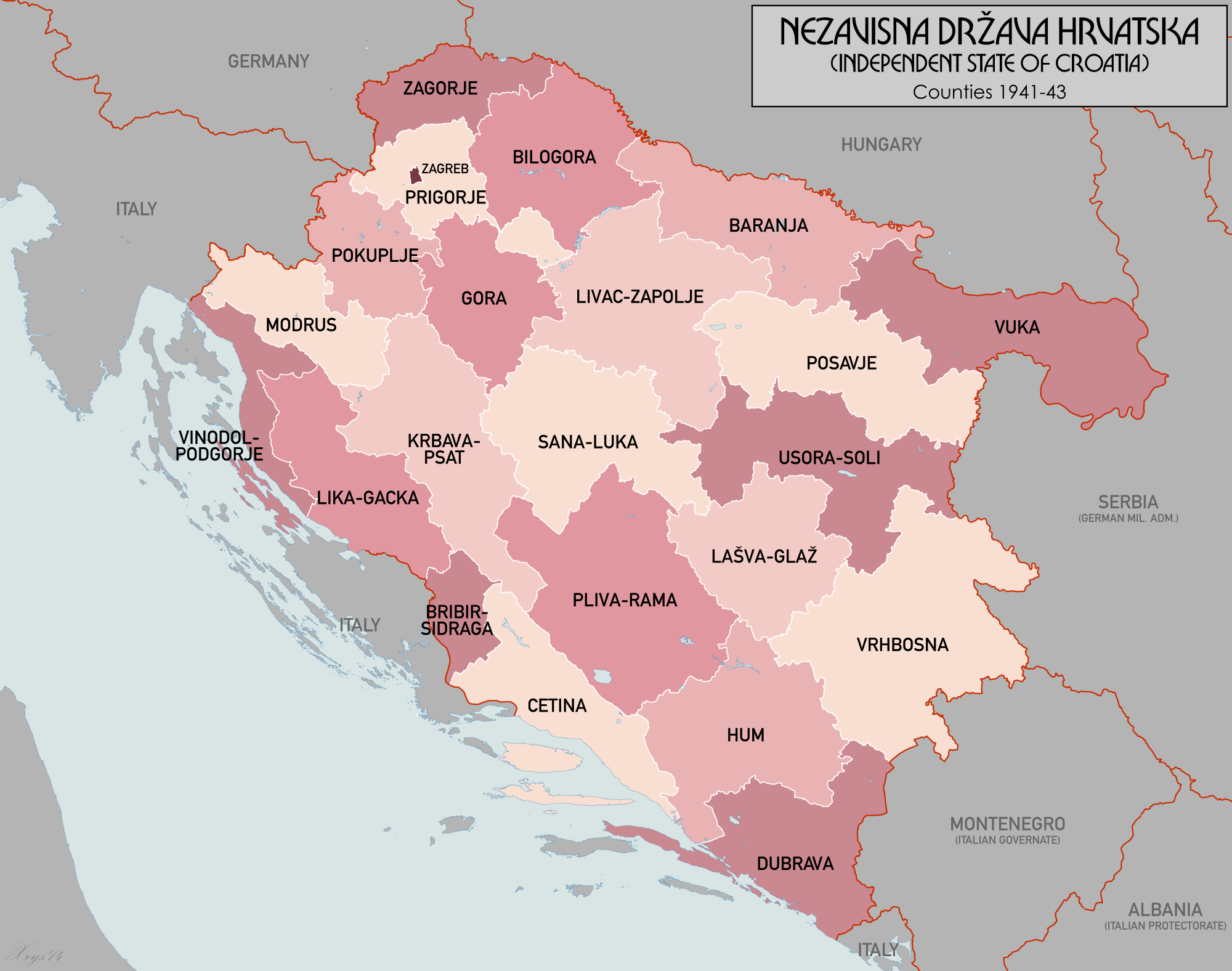
Administrative Divisions (1941–1943)

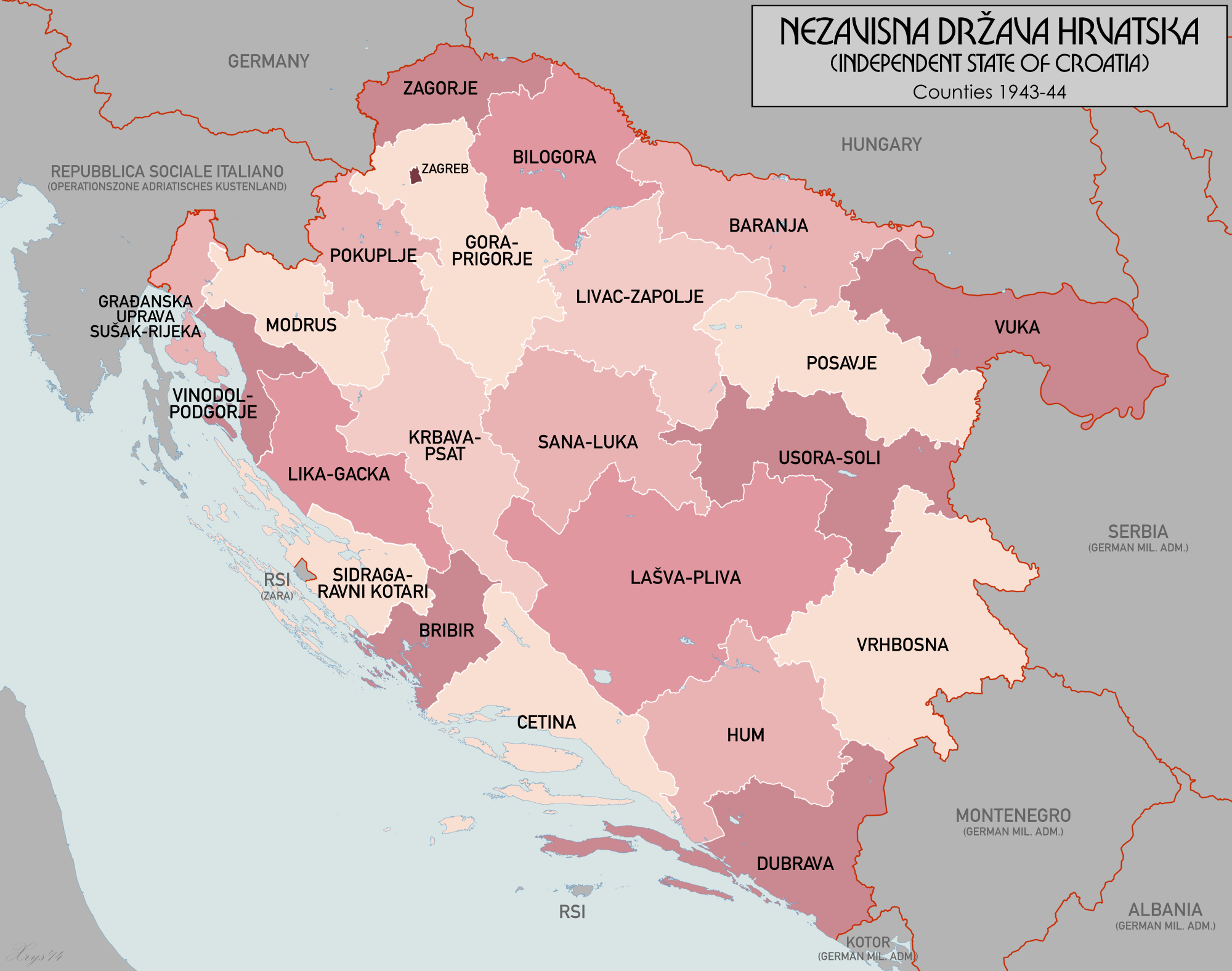
Administrative Divisions (1943–1945)

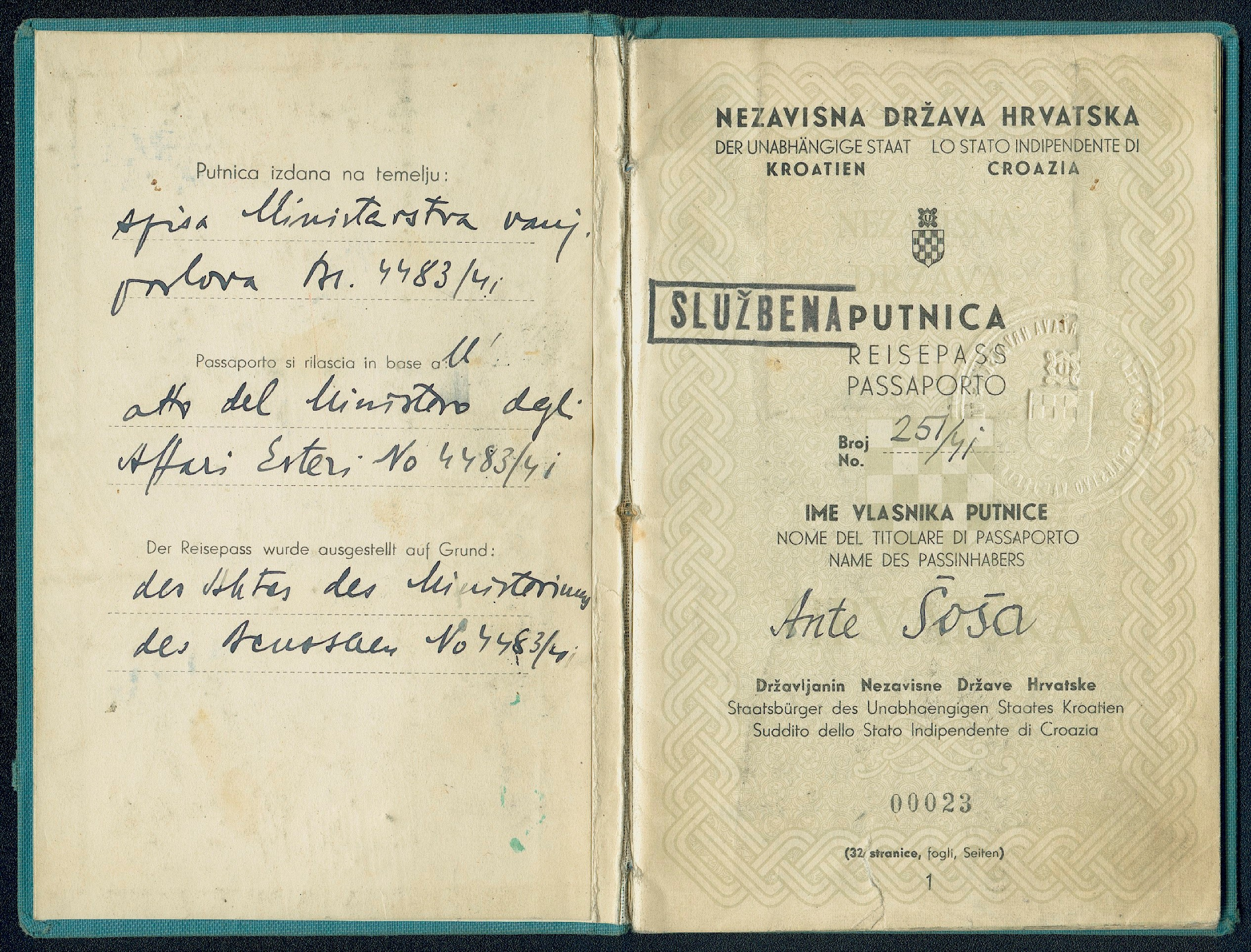
Diplomatic passport issued in 1941 to Ante Šoša, employee of NDH's consulte in Vienna

=== Military ===
The NDH founded the Army of the Independent State of Croatia (Serbo-Croatian: Hrvatsko domobranstvo) and Navy of the Independent State of Croatia in April 1941 with the consent of the German armed forces (Wehrmacht). The task of the armed forces was to defend the state against both foreign and domestic enemies. The Army included an air force. The NDH also created the Ustaška Vojnica (Ustaše Militia) which was conceived as a party militia, and a gendarmerie. The Army was originally limited to 16 infantry battalions and 2 cavalry squadrons – 16,000 men in total. The original 16 battalions were soon enlarged to 15 infantry regiments of two battalions each between May and June 1941, organised into five divisional commands, some 55,000 men. Support units included 35 light tanks supplied by Italy, 10 artillery battalions (equipped with captured Royal Yugoslav Army weapons of Czech origin), a cavalry regiment in Zagreb and an independent cavalry battalion at Sarajevo. Two independent motorised infantry battalions were based at Zagreb and Sarajevo respectively. Under the terms of the Treaties of Rome with Italy, the NDH navy was restricted to a few coastal and patrol craft, which mostly patrolled inland waterways.

When established in 1941, the Air Force of the Independent State of Croatia (Serbo-Croatian: Zrakoplovstvo Nezavisne Države Hrvatske) (ZNDH), consisted of captured Royal Yugoslav aircraft (seven operational fighters, 20 bombers and about 180 auxiliary and training aircraft) as well as paratroop, training and anti-aircraft artillery commands. During the course of World War II in Yugoslavia, it was supplemented with several hundred new or overhauled German, Italian and French fighters and bombers, until receiving the final deliveries of new aircraft from Germany in April 1945. The Croatian Air Force Legion (Serbo-Croatian: Hrvatska Zrakoplovna Legija), or HZL, was a military unit of the Air Force of the Independent State of Croatia which fought alongside the Luftwaffe on the Eastern Front from 1941 to 1943 and then back on Croatian soil. The unit was sent to Germany for training on 15 July 1941 before heading to the Eastern Front. Many of the pilots and crews had previously served in the Royal Yugoslav Air Force during the Invasion of Yugoslavia in April 1941. Some of them also had experience in the two main types that they would operate, the Messerschmitt Bf 109 and Dornier Do 17, with two fighter pilots having actually shot down Luftwaffe aircraft.

During operations over the Eastern Front, the unit's fighters scored a total of 283 kills while its bombers participated in some 1,500 combat missions. Upon return to Croatia from December 1942, the unit's aircraft proved a strong addition to the strike power of the Axis forces fighting the Partisans right up to the end of 1944. Because of low morale among army conscripts and their increasing disaffection with the Ustaša regime as the war progressed, the Partisans came to regard them as a key element in their supply line. According to William Deakin, who led one of the British missions to the Partisan commander-in-chief Josip Broz Tito, in some areas, Partisans would release army soldiers after disarming them, so they could come back into the field with replacement weapons, which would again be seized. Other army soldiers either defected or actively channelled supplies to the Partisans – particularly after the NDH ceded Dalmatia to Italy. Army troop numbers dwindled from 130,000 in early 1943 to 70,000 by late 1944, at which point the NDH government amalgamated the army with the Ustaše army and was organised into eighteen divisions, including artillery and armoured units. Despite these difficulties, the army, along with the German-commanded XV SS Cossack Cavalry Corps, was able to assist the Wehrmacht to hold its lines in Syrmia, Slavonia and Bosnia against the combined Soviet, Bulgarian and Partisan offensives from late 1944 to shortly before the NDH collapse in May 1945.

The Air Force of the Independent State of Croatia provided some level of air support (attack, fighter and transport) right up until May 1945, encountering and sometimes defeating opposing aircraft from the British Royal Air Force, United States Air Force and the Soviet Air Force. The final deliveries of up-to-date German Messerschmitt Bf 109G and K fighter aircraft were still taking place in April 1945. By the end of March 1945, it was obvious to the Croatian Army Command that, although the front remained intact, they would eventually be defeated by sheer lack of ammunition. For this reason, the decision was made to retreat into Austria, in order to surrender to the British forces advancing north from Italy. The German Army was in the process of disintegration and the supply system lay in ruins. However, the British, not having resources to accommodate non-German POWs, forced them to surrender to the Yugoslav Partisans. About 120,000 NDH troops surrendered that way, and about half of these were killed shortly afterward amid the broader Bleiburg repatriations.

== Genocide policies ==
An Ustase guard stands among the bodies of prisoners murdered in the Jasenovac concentration camp, 1942

Historian Irina Ognyanova stated that the similarities between the NDH and the Third Reich included the assumption that terror and genocide were necessary for the preservation of the state. Michael Phayer explained that the genocide in Croatia began before the Nazis decided to kill Europe's Jews, while Jonathan Steinberg stated that the crimes against Serbs in the NDH were the "earliest total genocide to be attempted during the World War II". On the first day of his arrival in Zagreb, Ante Pavelić proclaimed a law that remained in effect during the entire period of the Independent State of Croatia. The law, which was enacted on 17 April 1941, declared that all people who offended, or tried to offend, the Croatian nation were guilty of treason – a crime punishable by death. One day later, on 18 April, the first Croatian antisemitic racial law was published. This law did not create panic among the Jewish population, because they believed it was merely a continuation of the antisemitic laws of the Kingdom of Yugoslavia, which were proclaimed in 1939. However, the situation quickly changed on 30 April, with the publication of the Aryan race laws. A notable part of the racial legislation was the religious conversion laws, the implications of which were not understood by the majority of the population when they were published on 3 May 1941. The implications became clear following the July speech of the minister of education, Mile Budak, in which he declared: "We will kill one third of all Serbs. We will deport another third, and the rest of them will be forced to convert to Catholicism". Racial laws were enforced until 3 May 1945.

The NDH government cooperated with Nazi Germany in the Holocaust and exercised their own version of the genocide against ethnic Serbs living within their borders. State policy regarding Serbs was first declared in the words of Milovan Žanić, the minister of the NDH Legislative council on 2 May 1941: "This country can only be a Croatian country, and there is no method we would hesitate to use in order to make it truly Croatian and cleanse it of Serbs, who have for centuries endangered us and who will endanger us again if they are given the opportunity." An estimated 320,000–340,000 Serbs, 30,000 Croatian Jews and 30,000 Roma were killed during the NDH, including between 77,000 and 99,000 Serbs, Bosniaks, Croats, Jews and Roma killed in the Jasenovac concentration camp while approximately 300,000 Serbs were forced out of the NDH.

Although the Ustase's main target for persecution were Serbs, it also participated in the destruction of the Jewish and Roma populations. The NDH deviated from Nazi anti-Semitic policy by promising honorary Aryan citizenship to some Jews, if they were willing to enlist and fight for the NDH. Croatian historian Ivo Goldstein estimates that 135,000 Croats were also killed in the NDH, 70,000 as actual or suspected collaborators (killed by the Partisans) with 19,000 perishing in prisons or camps, as opponents of the Ustashe regime, and 46,000 killed as Partisans.

According to the 1931 and 1948 census, the Serb population declined in Croatia and increased in Bosnia:

Serbs	Croatia	Bosnia and Herzegovina	Srem, Serbia	Total
1931 Census	633,000	1,028,139	210,000	1,871,000
1948 Census	543,795	1,136,116	unknown (Note: Settlement of 300,000 Serb refugees from Croatia, Bosnia and Montenegro altered the demographic balance in Vojvodina and Srem by 1948)	1,672,000+

Serbs in the NDH suffered among the highest casualty rates in Europe during the World War II. The political scientist Rudolph Rummel placed the NDH as one of the most lethal regimes in the 20th century in his book on "democide". However, the historian Tomislav Dulić, in a critical analysis of Rummel's estimates for Yugoslavia, said that they are in contrast with Yugoslav demographic research and are too high. Historian Stanley G. Payne claimed that direct and indirect executions by NDH regime were an "extraordinary mass crime", which in proportionate terms exceeded any other European regime beside Hitler's Third Reich. He added the crimes in the NDH were proportionately surpassed only by the Khmer Rouge in Cambodia and several of the extremely genocidal African regimes.

== Economy ==
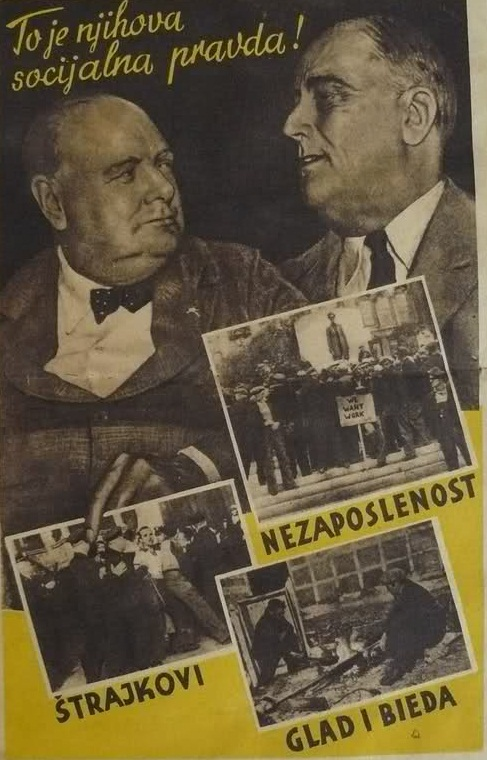
Propaganda poster showing Winston Churchill and Franklin D. Roosevelt with the words: "This is their social justice!; Strikes; Unemployment; Hunger and misery"

The economy of the Independent State of Croatia was largely subordinated to the economic interests of Nazi Germany and Fascist Italy, and had to meet significant obligations to them. The dominant power was Nazi Germany, which demanded supplies of raw materials from the NDH in order to support the German economy and its war effort. The Croatian workforce was also seen as a potential replacement for some of the German workers who had been recruited into the military and were sent off to war. An economic agreement signed in May 1941 provided Germany with unrestricted access to industrial raw materials in the NDH, and obligated the NDH to bear the costs of German military units stationed on its territory; this was a very large burden given the small size of the Croatian economy. Similar agreements were also concluded with Italy on a more short-term basis (they had to be renewed every three months), which obligated the NDH to support and resupply Italian army units within its borders, to make monthly payments to Italy, and to allow the Italian military to freely cut down trees for lumber.

The German and Italian authorities did not coordinate their respective policies towards Croatia, resulting in overlapping and conflicting demands which further burdened the Croatian economy. In particular, both Germany and Italy demanded large quantities of bauxite, iron ore, wood and grain. Edmund Glaise-Horstenau, the German Plenipotentiary General, blamed Italy for demanding too much from the NDH, while Galeazzo Ciano wrote in his diary that the Germans had such control over the NDH that the Croatian economy had become an Italian-German problem. Officially, the economy of the NDH was supposed to be reorganized into a new economic order inspired by the German model, which was to be a managed economy with strong involvement of the state in economic life. However, the new economic order remained only a theoretical goal, unrealized in practice.

Upon coming to power, the Ustaša had promised significant social and economic changes, in line with their ideology which held that the Croatian nation had been oppressed by Jews and Serbs, economically as well as politically. In 1942, economist Ante Frlić published a report on property ownership in the NDH, which argued that the country found itself in a difficult economic situation because most of the businesses were "in the hands of the Jews, and many were in Serb hands too," while Croats only had small businesses. The "foreign businesses" – those owned by Jews or Serbs – were placed under the authority of state-appointed commissars, while Frlić called for a "new morally based economic system" that would meet the needs of the Croatian people and the army. The new economic system promised by the Ustaša was heavily inspired by Italian Fascist corporatism and went by several different names; Ustaše theoretician Aleksandar Seitz called it "Croatian socialism". This idea was opposed to both communism and capitalism and "attempted to create a psychic unity among the peasant in the village, the worker in the town, intellectuals in garrets, white-collar workers in offices, and warriors on the battlefield". Seitz declared that the aim was to bring together all classes and estates to work for the national community; this national community was held to be a concept opposed to both Marxists and capitalists, because "the former knew only of classes, while the latter recognized only free markets." The desire to build a Croatian national community was seen as a part of a broader European national revolution that was opposed to the ideologies of the United States and the Soviet Union, two forces accused of seeking the "levelling of all human cultures".

At the beginning of 1942 the government introduced compulsory work service for all citizens between the age of 18 and 25. Economic branches of which NDH had most revenue (collected through direct and indirect taxes) included industry, trade and crafts. Around 20% of state's industrial enterprises accounted for wood industry. However, as the war progressed, industrial production in the territory of NDH was constantly decreasing, while inflation continued growing.

In 1942, 80% of NDH exports went to Germany (including Austria, Protectorate of Bohemia and Moravia and the Polish General Government) and 12% to Italy. Germany covered 70% of imports, while Italy covered 25%. Other trade partners included Hungary, Romania, Finland, Serbia and Switzerland. Exports from NDH mainly consisted of lumber and wood products, agricultural products (including tobacco), livestock, ore, and strategically important bauxite. NDH mostly imported machinery, tools and other metal products, textiles and fuel.

=== Currency ===
The NDH currency was the Independent State of Croatia kuna. The Croatian State Bank was the central bank, responsible for issuing currency. The kuna adhered to the gold standard at approximately 17.91 milligrams of fine gold per kuna. The State Bank authorized the exchange of defunct Yugoslav Dinar banknotes at par to kuna banknotes. Only Croat nationals could have held bank accounts in the NDH. On 10 December 1941, postal bank accounts belonging to Serbs, Jews and Gypsies were confiscated. From April 1941 to May 1945, there was a thirty-two-fold increase in the currency circulation across the NDH. Up until 1942, 7.55 billion Yugoslav dinars were replaced by the NDH kuna at an exchange rate of 1 dinar for 1 kuna. Afterwards, the government kept printing money and its amount in circulation increased rapidly, resulting in high inflation rates. By the end of 1943 there were 43.6 billion kunas in circulation and in August 1944, 76.8 billion kuna. Constant printing of money was a way of financing huge government spending, especially on the upkeep of German and Italian troops in the NDH, which could not be covered by increased taxation and long-term borrowing. The NDH inherited 42% or 32.5 million reichsmarks of the total debt which Yugoslavia owed to Germany. According to official data, the total debt of NDH on clearing accounts at the end of 1944 amounted to 969.8 million kunas.

On 6 May 1945, days prior to the dissolution of the NDH government, the Ustaše regime cleared out the vaults of the National Bank of Croatia, including the NDH gold reserve. In total, approximately 200 kilograms of gold bars, 12 thousand Napoléon gold coins, Turkish lira gold coins, two thousand gold plates, foreign banknotes worth several million kunas and diamonds of various sizes was taken.

=== Railways ===
The NDH formed the Croatian State Railways after the Yugoslav Railways was dissolved, and Serbian State Railways in Serbia was devolved. In May 1943, German authorities began deporting Croatian Jews from the NDH by cattle car to Auschwitz, where nearly all victims were gassed upon arrival.

=== German role ===
In the Independent State of Croatia, which Nazi Germany formally treated as a sovereign state, most, if not all, industrial and economic activity was either monopolized, or given a high priority for exploitation, by Germany. Agreements between the two governments in mid-1941 regulated foreign trade and payments and the export of Croatian labour to Germany. Germany already controlled a large number of industrial and mining enterprises in Croatia that were owned in part or in full by German citizens or citizens of German-occupied countries. Many other enterprises in Croatia, especially in the bauxite mining and timber industries, were leased to the Germans for the duration of the war. The Germans also held large interests in Croatian commercial banks, exercised either directly by banks in Berlin and Vienna, or indirectly, by German banks that had large interests in Prague and Budapest banks.

From the beginning, the Germans showed great interest in the high-quality iron ore mines of Ljubija in northwest Bosnia, in the industrial complex (steel, coal and heavy chemicals) in the Sarajevo–Tuzla–Zenica triangle in northeast Bosnia, and in bauxite. As the war advanced and German military involvement in Croatia expanded, more and more Croatian industry was put to work for the Germans. The bauxite mines in Hercegovina, Dalmatia and western Bosnia, were in the Italian zone of occupation, but their total production was earmarked for German needs for the duration of the war under the German-Italian agreement of 1941. Other Croatian industrial assets utilized by the Germans included the production of brown coal and lignite, cement (major plants in Zagreb and Split), oil and salt. Crude oil production, from fields to the east of Zagreb developed by the American Vacuum Oil Company, only started in November 1941 and never reached a high level, averaging 24,000 barrels (3,800 m^{3}) a month in mid-1944. The most important commodities manufactured in Croatia for German use were prefabricated barracks (utilizing the large Croatian timber industry), clothing, dry-cell batteries, bridge construction parts and ammunition (grenades). The Vareš iron ore mine supplied the steel mill at Zenica, which had a capacity of 120,000 tons of steel annually. The Zenica mill, in turn, supplied the state arsenal in Sarajevo and the machinery and railroad car factory in Slavonski Brod, both of which produced various items for the Wehrmacht during the war, including grenades and shell casings. Some Vareš iron ore was also exported to Italy, Hungary and Romania.

=== Italian role ===
In the region of the NDH controlled by Italy there were some important timber stands, several cement plants, an aluminium plant at Lozovac, a carbide and chemical fertilizer plant at Dugi Rat, and a ferromanganese and cast iron plant near Šibenik, ship building operations in Split, a few brown coal mines supplying fuel to railways, shipping and industry, and rich bauxite fields.

== Demographics ==
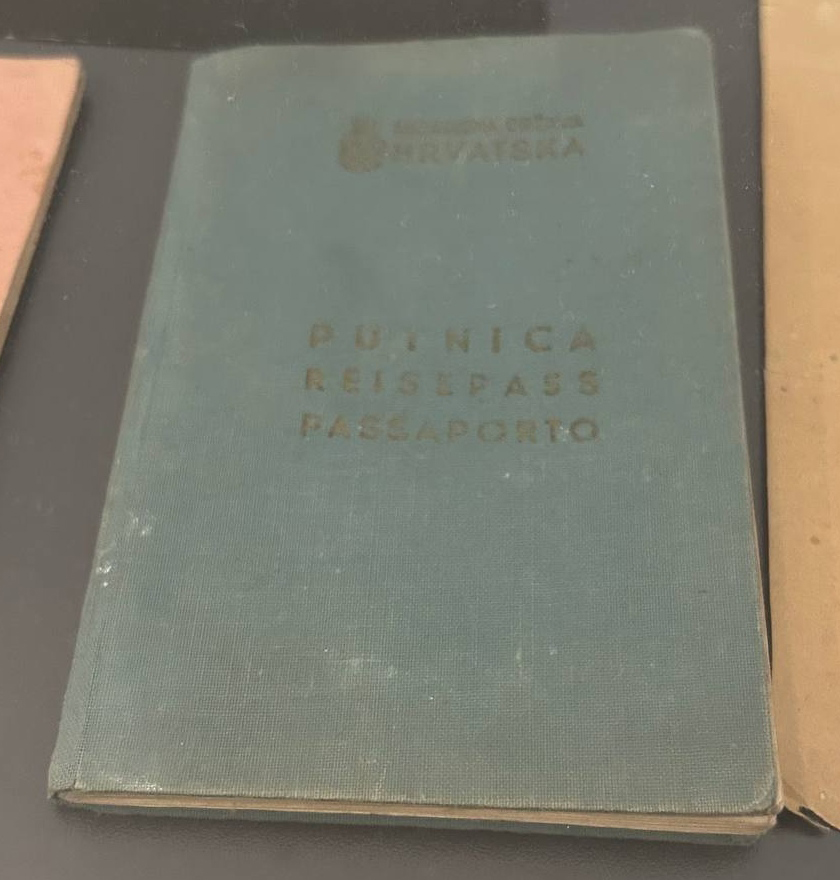
NDH travel document (putnica)

=== Population ===
According to data calculated by the German Ministry of Foreign Affairs during the creation of the state, the population was approximately 6,285,000 of which 3,300,000 (52.5%) were Croats, 1,925,000 (30.6%) were Serbs, 700,000 (11.1%) were Muslims, 150,000 (2.3%) Germans, 65,000 (1.0%) Czechs and Slovaks, 40,000 (0.6%) Jews, and 30,000 (0.4%) Slovenes. Croats comprised slightly over half of the population of the Independent State of Croatia. With Muslims treated as Croats, the Croat share of the total population was still less than two-thirds.

=== Displacement of people ===
A large number of people were displaced due to the internal fighting within Yugoslavia. The NDH had to accept more than 200,000 Slovenian refugees who were forcefully evicted from their homes as part of the German plan of annexing parts of the Slovenian territories. As part of this deal, the Ustaše were to deport 200,000 Serbs from Croatia military regions; however, only 182,000 had been deported when German high commander Bader stopped this mass transport of people because of the uprising of Chetniks and partisans in Serbia. An estimated 120,000 Serbs were deported from NDH to German-occupied Serbia, and 300,000 fled by 1943.

Internal colonization to the region of Slavonia was encouraged during this period from Dalmatia, Lika, Hrvatsko Zagorje and Bosnia and Herzegovina. The state maintained an Office of Colonization in Mostar, Osijek, Petrinja, Sarajevo, Sremska Mitrovica, and Zagreb.

== Culture ==
Soon after the establishment of the NDH, the Yugoslav Academy of Science and Arts in Zagreb was renamed the Croatian Academy of Sciences and Arts. The country had four state theatres: in Zagreb, Osijek, Dubrovnik and Sarajevo. The Croatian State Theatre in Zagreb played host to the Berlin Philharmonic and the Teatro dell'Opera di Roma in the 1941–42 season. Volumes two to five of Mate Ujević's Croatian Encyclopedia were published during this period. The Velebit Publishing House (Nakladna knjižara "Velebit"), named for the Velebit uprising, published pro-Axis works, including Japanac o Japanu [A Japanese on Japan] by the Japanese chargé d'affaires, Kazuichi Miura. The NDH was represented at the 1942 Venice Biennale, where the works of Joza Kljaković, Ivan Meštrović, Ante Motika, Ivo Režek, Bruno Bulić, Josip Crnobori, Antun Medić, Slavko Kopač and Slavko Šohaj were presented by Vladimir Kirin.

The existing University of Zagreb was renamed the Croatian University (Serbo-Croatian: Hrvatsko sveučilište), and was the only university in the NDH. The university established a pharmaceutical faculty in 1942, and a medical faculty in Sarajevo in 1944. It also opened the University Hospital Zagreb, which later became one of the largest hospitals in Croatia.

The state had two secular holidays; the anniversary of its establishment was commemorated on 10 April and the assassination of Stjepan Radić was commemorated on 20 June. In addition, the state granted holidays to several religious communities:

- The Catholic community celebrated New Year's Day, Epiphany, the feast of the Presentation of the Lord, the feast of Saint Joseph, Easter, the feast of the Ascension of Jesus, Pentecost, the feast of Corpus Christi, the Assumption of Mary, the feast of All Saints, the feast of the Immaculate Conception, and Christmas.
- The Eastern Orthodox community celebrated New Year's Day, the Epiphany, the feast of the Annunciation, Easter, the feast of the Ascension of Jesus, Pentecost, the Assumption of Mary, and Christmas, all according to the Roman calendar.
- The Evangelical community celebrated New Year's Day, Holy Friday, Easter, the feast of the Ascension of Jesus, Pentecost, Reformation Day, Christmas Eve, and Christmas.
- The Muslim community celebrated Islamic New Year, Mevlud (Mawlid), Ramadan, and Kurban-Bajram (Eid al-Adha).

The state film institute, Hrvatski slikopis, produced many films, including Straža na Drini and Lisinski. The Croatian cinema pioneer Oktavijan Miletić, was active during this period. In 1943, Zagreb hosted the I. International Congress for Narrow Film.

On 29 April 1941 the Decree on building Croatian workers' family homes was issued which resulted in the development of so-called Pavelić neighbourhoods in the state's larger northern cities: Karlovac, Osijek, Sisak, Varaždin, and Zagreb. The neighbourhoods were largely based on similar workers housing in Germany. They are characterized by their wide avenues and lots, and for largely being made up of semi-detached homes.

=== Media ===
The official publication of the government was the Narodne novine (Official Gazette). Dailies included Zagreb's Hrvatski narod (Croatian Nation), Osijek's Hrvatski list (Croatian Paper) and Sarajevo's Novi list (New Paper). The state's news agency was called the Croatian News Office "Croatia" (Hrvatski dojavni ured "Croatia"), which took on the role formerly performed by the Avala news agency in Yugoslavia. After the war's end, out of 330 registered journalists in the state, 38 were executed, 131 emigrated, and 100 were banned from working as journalists in the Federal People's Republic of Yugoslavia.

The state's main radio station was Hrvatski Krugoval, known before the war as Radio Zagreb. The NDH increased the transmitter's power to 10 kW. The radio station was based in Zagreb, but had branches in Banja Luka, Dubrovnik, Osijek and Sarajevo. It maintained cooperation with the International Broadcasting Union.

=== Sport ===
The most popular sport in the NDH was football, which had its own league system, with the highest level known as the Zvonimir Group, with eight teams in 1942–1943 and 1943–1944. Top clubs included Građanski Zagreb, Concordia Zagreb and HAŠK. The Croatian Football Federation was accepted into FIFA on 17 July 1941.

The NDH national football team played 14 friendly matches against other Axis nations and puppet states between June 1941 and April 1944, winning five.

The NDH had other national teams. The Croatian Handball Federation organized a national handball league, and a national team. Its boxing team was led by African-American Jimmy Lyggett.

The Croatian Table-Tennis Association organized a national competition as well as a national team which participated in a few international matches. The Croatian Olympic Committee was recognized as a special member of the International Olympic Committee, with Franjo Bučar acting as its representative.

The Croatian Skiing Association organized a national championship, held on Zagreb's Sljeme mountain. A national bowling competition was held in 1942 in Zagreb, which was won by Dušan Balatinac.

== See also ==
- Concentration camps in the Independent State of Croatia
- Glina massacre
- History of the Jews in Croatia: The Holocaust
- List of Croatian Righteous Among the Nations
- Orders, decorations, and medals of the Independent State of Croatia
- The Holocaust in the Independent State of Croatia
- Timeline of Croatian history
- Croatian–Romanian–Slovak friendship proclamation

== Sources ==
- Ambrose, S. The Victors – The Men of World War II, Simon & Schuster, London, 1998. ISBN 978-0-7434-9242-3
- Bulajić, Milan (1994). The Role of the Vatican in the break-up of the Yugoslav State: The Mission of the Vatican in the Independent State of Croatia. Ustashi Crimes of Genocide. Belgrade: Stručna knjiga.
- Baumann, Robert F.; Gawrych, George W.; Kretchik, Walter E. (2004). Armed Peacekeepers in Bosnia. DIANE Publishing. ISBN 1-4289-1020-4.
- Cohen, Philip J. (1996). Serbia's Secret War: Propaganda and the Deceit of History. Texas A&M University Press. ISBN 978-0-89096-760-7.
- Deutschland Military Tribunal (1950). Trials of war criminals before the Nuernberg Military Tribunals under Control Council Law no. 10 : Nuernberg Oct. 1946 – April 1949 Vol. 11 The High Command case. The Hostage case. Case 12. US v. von Leeb. Case 7. US v. List. Washington, D.C.: United States Government Printing Office. OCLC 247746272.
- Encyclopædia Britannica, 1943 – Book of the year, page 215, Entry: Croatia.
- Encyclopædia Britannica, Edition 1991 Macropædia, Vol. 29, page 1111.
- Fein, Helen: Accounting for Genocide – Victims and Survivors of the Holocaust, The Free Press, New York, Edition 1979, pages 102, 103.
- Hoare, Marko Attila (2006). Genocide and Resistance in Hitler's Bosnia: The Partisans and the Chetniks 1941–1943. New York: Oxford University Press. ISBN 0-19-726380-1.
- Hory, Ladislaus and Broszat, Martin: Der Kroatische Ustascha-Staat, 1941–1945, Stuttgart, 1964.
- Krizman, Bogdan (1980). Pavelić između Hitlera i Mussolinija [Pavelić between Hitler and Mussolini]. Zagreb: Globus. OCLC 7833178.
- Likso, T. and Čanak, D., Hrvatsko Ratno Zrakoplovstvo u Drugome Svjetskom Ratu (The Croatian Air Force in the Second World War), Zagreb, 1998. ISBN 953-97698-0-9.
- Encyclopedia of the Holocaust, Vol. 2, Independent State of Croatia entry.
- Maček, Vlado: In the Struggle for Freedom Robert Speller & Sons, New York, 1957.
- Matković, Hrvoje (2002). Povijest Nezavisne Države Hrvatske (PDF) (in Croatian) (2nd ed.). Zagreb: Naklada Pavičić. ISBN 953-6308-39-8.
- Munoz, A.J., For Croatia and Christ: The Croatian Army in World War II 1941–1945, Axis Europa Books, Bayside NY, 1996. ISBN 1-891227-33-5.
- Neubacher, Hermann: Sonderauftrag Suedost 1940–1945, Bericht eines fliegendes Diplomaten, 2. durchgesehene Auflage, Goettingen 1956.
- Novak, Viktor (2011). Magnum Crimen: Half a Century of Clericalism in Croatia. Vol. 1. Jagodina: Gambit. ISBN 9788676240494.
- Novak, Viktor (2011). Magnum Crimen: Half a Century of Clericalism in Croatia. Vol. 2. Jagodina: Gambit. ISBN 9788676240494.
- Ognyanova, Irina (2000). "Nationalism and National Policy in Independent State of Croatia (1941–1945)". In Rogers, Dorothy; Joshua, Wheeler; Zavacká, Marína; Casebier, Shawna (eds.). Topics in Feminism, History and Philosophy, IWM Junior Visiting Fellows Conferences, Vol. 6. Vienna, Austria: Otto Harrassowitz Verlag.
- Pavlowitch, Stevan K. (2008). Hitler's new disorder: the Second World War in Yugoslavia. Columbia University Press. ISBN 978-0-231-70050-4.
- Ramet, Sabrina P. (2006). The Three Yugoslavias: State-Building and Legitimation, 1918–2005. New York: Indiana University Press. ISBN 978-0-25334-656-8.
- Rivelli, Marco Aurelio (1998). Le génocide occulté: État Indépendant de Croatie 1941–1945 [Hidden Genocide: The Independent State of Croatia 1941–1945] (in French). Lausanne: L'age d'Homme. ISBN 9782825111529.
- Rivelli, Marco Aurelio (1999). L'arcivescovo del genocidio: Monsignor Stepinac, il Vaticano e la dittatura ustascia in Croazia, 1941-1945 [The Archbishop of Genocide: Monsignor Stepinac, the Vatican and the Ustaše dictatorship in Croatia, 1941-1945] (in Italian). Milano: Kaos. ISBN 9788879530798.
- Rivelli, Marco Aurelio (2002). "Dio è con noi!": La Chiesa di Pio XII complice del nazifascismo ["God is with us!": The Church of Pius XII accomplice to Nazi Fascism] (in Italian). Milano: Kaos. ISBN 9788879531047.
- Russo, Alfio: Revoluzione in Jugoslavia, Roma 1944.
- Savic, D. and Ciglic, B. Croatian Aces of World War II, Osprey Aircraft of the Aces −49, Oxford, 2002. ISBN 1-84176-435-3.
- Shaw, L., Trial by Slander: A Background to the Independent State of Croatia, Harp Books, Canberra, 1973. ISBN 0-909432-00-7
- Stojanović, Aleksandar (2017). "A Beleaguered Church: The Serbian Orthodox Church in the Independent State of Croatia (NDH) 1941-1945". Balcanica (48): 269–287. doi:10.2298/BALC1748269S.
- Tanner, Marcus. Croatia: A Nation Forged in War. New Haven: Yale University Press. 1997.
- Thomas, N., Mikulan, K. and Pavelic, D. Axis Forces in Yugoslavia 1941–45 Osprey, London, 1995. ISBN 1-85532-473-3
- Tomasevich, Jozo (1975). War and Revolution in Yugoslavia 1941–1945: The Chetniks, Volume 1. Stanford University Press. ISBN 978-0-8047-0857-9.
- Tomasevich, Jozo (2001). War and Revolution in Yugoslavia 1941-1945: Occupation and Collaboration. Stanford University Press. ISBN 0-8047-3615-4.
- Worldmark Encyclopedia of the Nations, Europe, edition 1995, page 91, entry: Croatia.
- Yeomans, Rory (2012). Visions of Annihilation: The Ustasha Regime and the Cultural Politics of Fascism, 1941–1945. Pittsburgh: University of Pittsburgh Press. ISBN 978-0-82297-793-3.
- Charny, Israel (1999). Encyclopedia of Genocide: A-H. ABC-CLIO. ISBN 9780874369281.
- Phayer, Michael (2000). The Catholic Church and the Holocaust, 1930–1965. Bloomington and Indianapolis: Indiana University Press. ISBN 9780253337252.
- Payne, Stanley G. (2006). "The NDH State in Comparative Perspective". Totalitarian Movements and Political Religions. 7 (4): 409–415. doi:10.1080/14690760600963198. S2CID 144782263.
- Dulić, Tomislav (2006). "Mass killing in the Independent State of Croatia, 1941–1945: a case for comparative research". Journal of Genocide Research. 8: 255–281. doi:10.1111/nana.12433. S2CID 242057219.

Region	until 1918	1918– 1929	1929– 1945	1941– 1945	1945– 1946	1946– 1963	1963– 1992	1992– 2003	2003– 2006	2006– 2008	since 2008
Slovenia	Part of Austria-Hungary including the Bay of Kotor See also: Kingdom of Croatia-Slavonia (1868–1918) Kingdom of Dalmatia (1815–1918) Condominium of Bosnia and Herzegovina (1878–1918)	State of Slovenes, Croats and Serbs (1918) Kingdom of Serbs, Croats and Slovenes (1918–1929) Kingdom of Yugoslavia (1929–1943) See also: Republic of Prekmurje (1919) Banat, Bačka and Baranja (1918–1919) Free State of Fiume (1920–1924) (1924–1945) Italian province of Zadar (1920–1947)		Annexed by Italy, Germany, and Hungary^{a}	Democratic Federal Yugoslavia (1943–1945) Federal People's Republic of Yugoslavia (1945–1963) Socialist Federal Republic of Yugoslavia (1963–1992) Consisted of the Socialist Republics of: Slovenia (1945–1991); Croatia (1945–1991); Bosnia and Herzegovina (1945–1992) Serbia (1945–1992) (included the autonomous provinces of Vojvodina and Kosovo) Montenegro (1945–1992); Macedonia (1945–1991) See also: Free Territory of Trieste (1947–1954)^{h}			Republic of Slovenia; Ten-Day War			
Dalmatia	Part of Austria-Hungary including the Bay of Kotor See also: Kingdom of Croatia-Slavonia (1868–1918) Kingdom of Dalmatia (1815–1918) Condominium of Bosnia and Herzegovina (1878–1918)	State of Slovenes, Croats and Serbs (1918) Kingdom of Serbs, Croats and Slovenes (1918–1929) Kingdom of Yugoslavia (1929–1943) See also: Republic of Prekmurje (1919) Banat, Bačka and Baranja (1918–1919) Free State of Fiume (1920–1924) (1924–1945) Italian province of Zadar (1920–1947)		Independent State of Croatia (1941–1945) Puppet state of Germany. Parts annexed by Italy. Međimurje and Baranja annexed by Hungary.	Democratic Federal Yugoslavia (1943–1945) Federal People's Republic of Yugoslavia (1945–1963) Socialist Federal Republic of Yugoslavia (1963–1992) Consisted of the Socialist Republics of: Slovenia (1945–1991); Croatia (1945–1991); Bosnia and Herzegovina (1945–1992) Serbia (1945–1992) (included the autonomous provinces of Vojvodina and Kosovo) Montenegro (1945–1992); Macedonia (1945–1991) See also: Free Territory of Trieste (1947–1954)^{h}			Republic of Croatia^{b} Croatian War of Independence			
Slavonia	Part of Austria-Hungary including the Bay of Kotor See also: Kingdom of Croatia-Slavonia (1868–1918) Kingdom of Dalmatia (1815–1918) Condominium of Bosnia and Herzegovina (1878–1918)	State of Slovenes, Croats and Serbs (1918) Kingdom of Serbs, Croats and Slovenes (1918–1929) Kingdom of Yugoslavia (1929–1943) See also: Republic of Prekmurje (1919) Banat, Bačka and Baranja (1918–1919) Free State of Fiume (1920–1924) (1924–1945) Italian province of Zadar (1920–1947)		Independent State of Croatia (1941–1945) Puppet state of Germany. Parts annexed by Italy. Međimurje and Baranja annexed by Hungary.	Democratic Federal Yugoslavia (1943–1945) Federal People's Republic of Yugoslavia (1945–1963) Socialist Federal Republic of Yugoslavia (1963–1992) Consisted of the Socialist Republics of: Slovenia (1945–1991); Croatia (1945–1991); Bosnia and Herzegovina (1945–1992) Serbia (1945–1992) (included the autonomous provinces of Vojvodina and Kosovo) Montenegro (1945–1992); Macedonia (1945–1991) See also: Free Territory of Trieste (1947–1954)^{h}			Republic of Croatia^{b} Croatian War of Independence			
Croatia	Part of Austria-Hungary including the Bay of Kotor See also: Kingdom of Croatia-Slavonia (1868–1918) Kingdom of Dalmatia (1815–1918) Condominium of Bosnia and Herzegovina (1878–1918)	State of Slovenes, Croats and Serbs (1918) Kingdom of Serbs, Croats and Slovenes (1918–1929) Kingdom of Yugoslavia (1929–1943) See also: Republic of Prekmurje (1919) Banat, Bačka and Baranja (1918–1919) Free State of Fiume (1920–1924) (1924–1945) Italian province of Zadar (1920–1947)		Independent State of Croatia (1941–1945) Puppet state of Germany. Parts annexed by Italy. Međimurje and Baranja annexed by Hungary.	Democratic Federal Yugoslavia (1943–1945) Federal People's Republic of Yugoslavia (1945–1963) Socialist Federal Republic of Yugoslavia (1963–1992) Consisted of the Socialist Republics of: Slovenia (1945–1991); Croatia (1945–1991); Bosnia and Herzegovina (1945–1992) Serbia (1945–1992) (included the autonomous provinces of Vojvodina and Kosovo) Montenegro (1945–1992); Macedonia (1945–1991) See also: Free Territory of Trieste (1947–1954)^{h}			Republic of Croatia^{b} Croatian War of Independence			
Bosnia	Part of Austria-Hungary including the Bay of Kotor See also: Kingdom of Croatia-Slavonia (1868–1918) Kingdom of Dalmatia (1815–1918) Condominium of Bosnia and Herzegovina (1878–1918)	State of Slovenes, Croats and Serbs (1918) Kingdom of Serbs, Croats and Slovenes (1918–1929) Kingdom of Yugoslavia (1929–1943) See also: Republic of Prekmurje (1919) Banat, Bačka and Baranja (1918–1919) Free State of Fiume (1920–1924) (1924–1945) Italian province of Zadar (1920–1947)		Independent State of Croatia (1941–1945) Puppet state of Germany. Parts annexed by Italy. Međimurje and Baranja annexed by Hungary.	Democratic Federal Yugoslavia (1943–1945) Federal People's Republic of Yugoslavia (1945–1963) Socialist Federal Republic of Yugoslavia (1963–1992) Consisted of the Socialist Republics of: Slovenia (1945–1991); Croatia (1945–1991); Bosnia and Herzegovina (1945–1992) Serbia (1945–1992) (included the autonomous provinces of Vojvodina and Kosovo) Montenegro (1945–1992); Macedonia (1945–1991) See also: Free Territory of Trieste (1947–1954)^{h}			Bosnia and Herzegovina^{c} Bosnian War Consists of the Federation of Bosnia and Herzegovina (since 1995), Republika Srpska (since 1995), and Brčko District (since 2000).			
Herzegovina	Part of Austria-Hungary including the Bay of Kotor See also: Kingdom of Croatia-Slavonia (1868–1918) Kingdom of Dalmatia (1815–1918) Condominium of Bosnia and Herzegovina (1878–1918)	State of Slovenes, Croats and Serbs (1918) Kingdom of Serbs, Croats and Slovenes (1918–1929) Kingdom of Yugoslavia (1929–1943) See also: Republic of Prekmurje (1919) Banat, Bačka and Baranja (1918–1919) Free State of Fiume (1920–1924) (1924–1945) Italian province of Zadar (1920–1947)		Independent State of Croatia (1941–1945) Puppet state of Germany. Parts annexed by Italy. Međimurje and Baranja annexed by Hungary.	Democratic Federal Yugoslavia (1943–1945) Federal People's Republic of Yugoslavia (1945–1963) Socialist Federal Republic of Yugoslavia (1963–1992) Consisted of the Socialist Republics of: Slovenia (1945–1991); Croatia (1945–1991); Bosnia and Herzegovina (1945–1992) Serbia (1945–1992) (included the autonomous provinces of Vojvodina and Kosovo) Montenegro (1945–1992); Macedonia (1945–1991) See also: Free Territory of Trieste (1947–1954)^{h}			Bosnia and Herzegovina^{c} Bosnian War Consists of the Federation of Bosnia and Herzegovina (since 1995), Republika Srpska (since 1995), and Brčko District (since 2000).			
Vojvodina	Part of the Délvidék region of Hungary	State of Slovenes, Croats and Serbs (1918) Kingdom of Serbs, Croats and Slovenes (1918–1929) Kingdom of Yugoslavia (1929–1943) See also: Republic of Prekmurje (1919) Banat, Bačka and Baranja (1918–1919) Free State of Fiume (1920–1924) (1924–1945) Italian province of Zadar (1920–1947)		Autonomous Banat^{d} (part of the German; Territory of the Military Commander in Serbia)	Democratic Federal Yugoslavia (1943–1945) Federal People's Republic of Yugoslavia (1945–1963) Socialist Federal Republic of Yugoslavia (1963–1992) Consisted of the Socialist Republics of: Slovenia (1945–1991); Croatia (1945–1991); Bosnia and Herzegovina (1945–1992) Serbia (1945–1992) (included the autonomous provinces of Vojvodina and Kosovo) Montenegro (1945–1992); Macedonia (1945–1991) See also: Free Territory of Trieste (1947–1954)^{h}			Federal Republic of Yugoslavia Consisted of the Republic of Serbia (1992–2006) and Republic of Montenegro (1992–2006) Included Kosovo and Metohija, under UN administration, without control since 1999	State Union of Serbia and Montenegro Included Kosovo, under UN administration	Republic of Serbia Included the autonomous provinces of Vojvodina and Kosovo and Metohija under UN administration	Republic of Serbia Includes the autonomous province of Vojvodina; Kosovo claim
Central Serbia	Kingdom of Serbia (1882–1918)	State of Slovenes, Croats and Serbs (1918) Kingdom of Serbs, Croats and Slovenes (1918–1929) Kingdom of Yugoslavia (1929–1943) See also: Republic of Prekmurje (1919) Banat, Bačka and Baranja (1918–1919) Free State of Fiume (1920–1924) (1924–1945) Italian province of Zadar (1920–1947)		Territory of the Military Commander in Serbia (1941–1944) ^{e}	Democratic Federal Yugoslavia (1943–1945) Federal People's Republic of Yugoslavia (1945–1963) Socialist Federal Republic of Yugoslavia (1963–1992) Consisted of the Socialist Republics of: Slovenia (1945–1991); Croatia (1945–1991); Bosnia and Herzegovina (1945–1992) Serbia (1945–1992) (included the autonomous provinces of Vojvodina and Kosovo) Montenegro (1945–1992); Macedonia (1945–1991) See also: Free Territory of Trieste (1947–1954)^{h}			Federal Republic of Yugoslavia Consisted of the Republic of Serbia (1992–2006) and Republic of Montenegro (1992–2006) Included Kosovo and Metohija, under UN administration, without control since 1999	State Union of Serbia and Montenegro Included Kosovo, under UN administration	Republic of Serbia Included the autonomous provinces of Vojvodina and Kosovo and Metohija under UN administration	Republic of Serbia Includes the autonomous province of Vojvodina; Kosovo claim
Kosovo	Part of the Kingdom of Serbia (1912–1918)	State of Slovenes, Croats and Serbs (1918) Kingdom of Serbs, Croats and Slovenes (1918–1929) Kingdom of Yugoslavia (1929–1943) See also: Republic of Prekmurje (1919) Banat, Bačka and Baranja (1918–1919) Free State of Fiume (1920–1924) (1924–1945) Italian province of Zadar (1920–1947)		Mostly annexed by Italian Albania (1941–1944) along with western Macedonia and south-eastern Montenegro	Democratic Federal Yugoslavia (1943–1945) Federal People's Republic of Yugoslavia (1945–1963) Socialist Federal Republic of Yugoslavia (1963–1992) Consisted of the Socialist Republics of: Slovenia (1945–1991); Croatia (1945–1991); Bosnia and Herzegovina (1945–1992) Serbia (1945–1992) (included the autonomous provinces of Vojvodina and Kosovo) Montenegro (1945–1992); Macedonia (1945–1991) See also: Free Territory of Trieste (1947–1954)^{h}			Federal Republic of Yugoslavia Consisted of the Republic of Serbia (1992–2006) and Republic of Montenegro (1992–2006) Included Kosovo and Metohija, under UN administration, without control since 1999	State Union of Serbia and Montenegro Included Kosovo, under UN administration	Republic of Serbia Included the autonomous provinces of Vojvodina and Kosovo and Metohija under UN administration	Republic of Kosovo
Metohija	Kingdom of Montenegro (1910–1918) Metohija controlled by Austria-Hungary 1915–1918	State of Slovenes, Croats and Serbs (1918) Kingdom of Serbs, Croats and Slovenes (1918–1929) Kingdom of Yugoslavia (1929–1943) See also: Republic of Prekmurje (1919) Banat, Bačka and Baranja (1918–1919) Free State of Fiume (1920–1924) (1924–1945) Italian province of Zadar (1920–1947)		Mostly annexed by Italian Albania (1941–1944) along with western Macedonia and south-eastern Montenegro	Democratic Federal Yugoslavia (1943–1945) Federal People's Republic of Yugoslavia (1945–1963) Socialist Federal Republic of Yugoslavia (1963–1992) Consisted of the Socialist Republics of: Slovenia (1945–1991); Croatia (1945–1991); Bosnia and Herzegovina (1945–1992) Serbia (1945–1992) (included the autonomous provinces of Vojvodina and Kosovo) Montenegro (1945–1992); Macedonia (1945–1991) See also: Free Territory of Trieste (1947–1954)^{h}			Federal Republic of Yugoslavia Consisted of the Republic of Serbia (1992–2006) and Republic of Montenegro (1992–2006) Included Kosovo and Metohija, under UN administration, without control since 1999	State Union of Serbia and Montenegro Included Kosovo, under UN administration	Republic of Serbia Included the autonomous provinces of Vojvodina and Kosovo and Metohija under UN administration	Republic of Kosovo
Montenegro and Brda	Kingdom of Montenegro (1910–1918) Metohija controlled by Austria-Hungary 1915–1918	State of Slovenes, Croats and Serbs (1918) Kingdom of Serbs, Croats and Slovenes (1918–1929) Kingdom of Yugoslavia (1929–1943) See also: Republic of Prekmurje (1919) Banat, Bačka and Baranja (1918–1919) Free State of Fiume (1920–1924) (1924–1945) Italian province of Zadar (1920–1947)		Protectorate of Montenegro^{f} (1941–1944)	Democratic Federal Yugoslavia (1943–1945) Federal People's Republic of Yugoslavia (1945–1963) Socialist Federal Republic of Yugoslavia (1963–1992) Consisted of the Socialist Republics of: Slovenia (1945–1991); Croatia (1945–1991); Bosnia and Herzegovina (1945–1992) Serbia (1945–1992) (included the autonomous provinces of Vojvodina and Kosovo) Montenegro (1945–1992); Macedonia (1945–1991) See also: Free Territory of Trieste (1947–1954)^{h}			Federal Republic of Yugoslavia Consisted of the Republic of Serbia (1992–2006) and Republic of Montenegro (1992–2006) Included Kosovo and Metohija, under UN administration, without control since 1999	State Union of Serbia and Montenegro Included Kosovo, under UN administration	Montenegro	
Vardar Macedonia	Part of the Kingdom of Serbia (1912–1918)	State of Slovenes, Croats and Serbs (1918) Kingdom of Serbs, Croats and Slovenes (1918–1929) Kingdom of Yugoslavia (1929–1943) See also: Republic of Prekmurje (1919) Banat, Bačka and Baranja (1918–1919) Free State of Fiume (1920–1924) (1924–1945) Italian province of Zadar (1920–1947)		Annexed by the Kingdom of Bulgaria (1941–1944)	Democratic Federal Yugoslavia (1943–1945) Federal People's Republic of Yugoslavia (1945–1963) Socialist Federal Republic of Yugoslavia (1963–1992) Consisted of the Socialist Republics of: Slovenia (1945–1991); Croatia (1945–1991); Bosnia and Herzegovina (1945–1992) Serbia (1945–1992) (included the autonomous provinces of Vojvodina and Kosovo) Montenegro (1945–1992); Macedonia (1945–1991) See also: Free Territory of Trieste (1947–1954)^{h}			Republic of North Macedonia^{g}			
^{a} Prekmurje annexed by Hungary.; ^{b} See also: SAO Kninska Krajina (1990) → SAO Krajina (1990–1991); and SAO Eastern Slavonia, Baranja and Western Syrmia (1990–1991), SAO Western Slavonia (1990–1991) and the Republic of Serbian Krajina (1990–1995), all replaced by the UN Transitional Administration for Eastern Slavonia, Baranja and Western Sirmium (1996–1998).; ^{c} See also: Republic of Bosnia and Herzegovina; Croatian Republic of Herzeg-Bosnia; and the Serbian Autonomous Oblasts (SAOs) of Bosanska Krajina, North-East Bosnia, Romanija and Herzegovina (1991–1992), which all combined to form the Serbian Republic of Bosnia and Herzegovina (1992–1995).; ^{d} Bačka was reannexed by Hungary (1941–1944), while Syrmia was annexed by the Independent State of Croatia (1941–1944).; ^{e} Including North Kosovo. See also: Republic of Užice.; ^{f} Annexed by Italy (1941–1943) and Germany (1943–1944). Smaller part annexed by the Independent State of Croatia (1941–1944).; ^{g} North Macedonia's official and constitutional name was the Republic of Macedonia until 2019. It was known in the United Nations as the former Yugoslav Republic of Macedonia because of a naming dispute with Greece.; ^{h} Free Territory was established in 1947. Its administration was divided into two areas (Zone A) and (Zone B). Free Territory was de facto taken over by Italy and SFRY in 1954.
