= Josip Karaman =

Josip Karaman (September 18, 1864 – July 11, 1921) was a Croatian film director and photographer. In 1907, he opened and led the first permanent theater in Split (Grand Electric Cinema, nowadays "Kino Karaman"). In 1910 he purchased his own camera and took several valuable historical documentaries, which are among the first domestic films in Croatia.
