= Straža na Drini =

- Directed by: Branko Marjanović
- Written by: Branko Marjanović
- Distributed by: Hrvatski Slikopis
- Release date: 1942
- Language: Croatian

Straža na Drini (Watch on the Drina) is a 1942 documentary and fascist propaganda war film directed by Branko Marjanović. The film was edited from the episodes of the weekly Ustasha newsreel. Along with the number of other films, it received a bronze diploma at the 1942 Venice Film Festival, attended only by the Axis countries (and later mostly not taken into consideration, because it even did not take place in Venice).

Watch on the Drina at commons.wikimedia.org
