= List of Ivorian films =

This is a chronological list of films produced in the Ivory Coast.

== 1960s ==
- Korogo (1964)
- Concerto pour un exil (1969), directed by Desiré Ecaré
- Mouna ou le rêve d'un artiste (1969)
- The Woman with the Knife (La Femme au Couteau; 1969), directed by Timité Bassori

== 1970s ==
- It's Up to Us, France (À nous deux, France; 1970), directed by Desiré Ecaré
- Abusuan (1972)
- Amanie (1972)
- Chapeau, Le (1975)
- Noirs et blancs en couleur (1976)
- Herbe sauvage, L' (1977)

== 1980s ==
- Adja Tio: À cause de l'héritage (1981)
- Djeli, conte d'aujourd'hui (1981)
- Dalokan (1983)
- Petanqui (1983)
- Comédie exotique (1984)
- Ablakon (1985)
- Faces of Women (Visages de femmes; 1985), directed by Desiré Ecaré
- J'ai choisi de vivre (1987)
- Regard de fous (1987)
- Vie platinée, La (1987)
- Ada dans la jungle (1988)
- Bal poussière (1988)
- Bouka (1988)
- Dancing in the Dust (1988)
- Guérisseurs, Les (1988)

== 1990s ==
- Sixième doigt, Le (1990)
- Au nom du Christ (1993)
- Rue princesse (1994)
- Wariko, le gros lot (1994)
- Noirs dans les camps nazis (1995)
- Bouzie (1997)
- Lunettes noires (1998)
- Nadro (1998)
- Woubi Cheri (1998)
- Jumelle, La (1999)
- Ngolo di papa (1999)
- Trois fables à l'usage des blancs en Afrique (1999)

== 2000s ==
- Adanggaman (2000)
- Djaatala (2002)
- Roues libres (2002)
- Pari de l'amour, Le (2003)
- Caramel (2004)
- Invités surprises (2008)

== 2010s ==
- Run (2014)

== 2020s ==
- Night of the Kings (La Nuit des rois) - 2020
