= Sidiki Bakaba =

Ivorian actor and film director

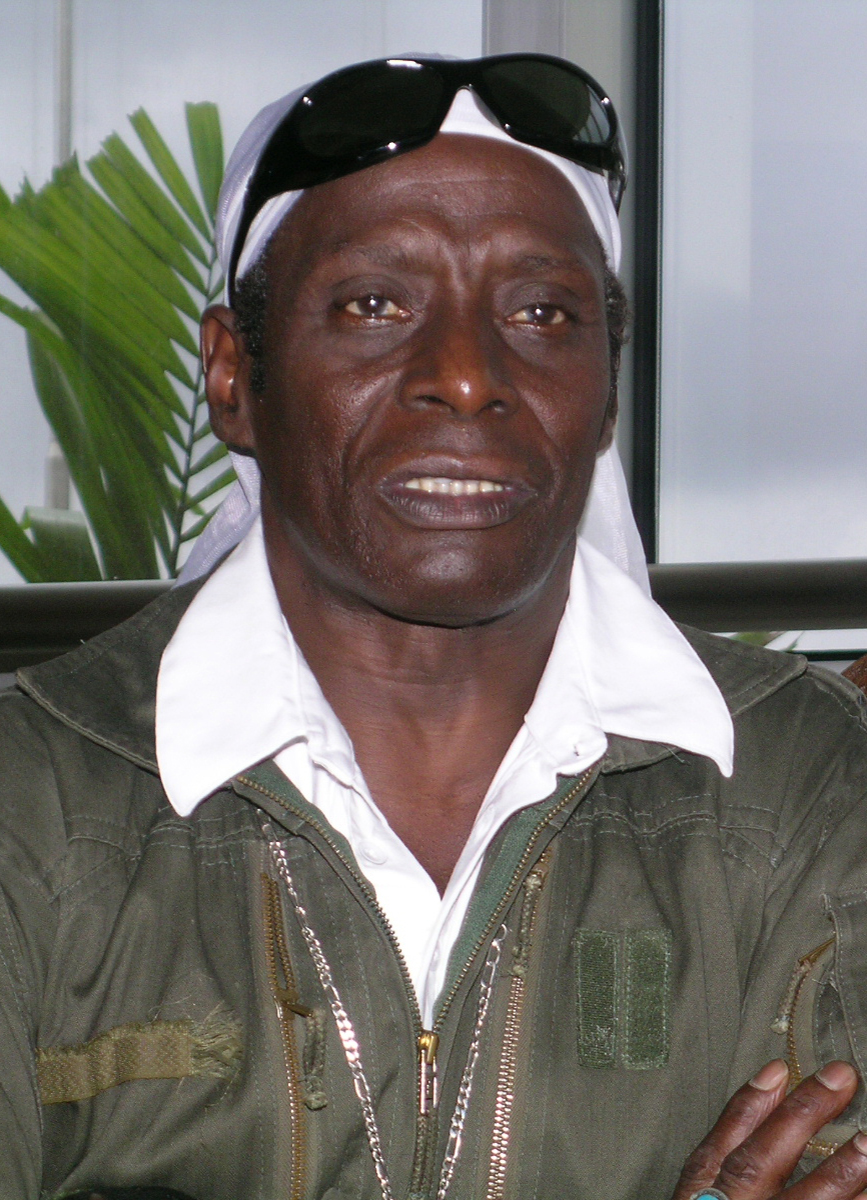
- Bakaba in 2008
- Born: 1949 (age 76–77); Abengourou, Ivory Coast
- Education: National School of Drama, National Institute for the Arts, International University of Theatre, Paris
- Occupations: actor, director

Sidiki Bakaba (born in Abengourou, 1949) is an actor, scenario writer and director from Côte d'Ivoire.

He lives and works in Abidjan. After studying at the National School of Drama of Abidjan, he conducted training at the Living Theatre and with Grotowski.

In 2000, he became the director of the Palace of Culture of Abidjan (Palais de la Culture d'Abidjan) located at Treichville. He also founded the Actor's Studio (an actor training school in the Palace of Culture)

Along with a significant acting career, he produced fiction films, documentaries such as Les Guérisseurs (1988) which won the award for best music at the Francophone Film Festival, as well as the Voice of Hope at FESPACO Ouagadougou in 1989. He directed short films such as Le Nord est tombé sur la tête (1985–1998) for TV5, Le Parole (1992), L'Anniversaire de Daymios (November 1992) and documentaries such as Cinq siècles de solitude and La victoire aux mains nues in 2002.

A close supporter of ex-president Laurent Gbagbo, Bakaba April 2011 he was in Gbagbo's residence in Abidjan during the siege which resulted in Gbagbo's capture and is reported to have been wounded during it.

== Education and training ==
- 1962–1966 in National School of Drama, in Abidjan. His focus was: stage production and actor management
- 1966–1970 in National Institute for the Arts, in Abidjan
- 1970–1972 in International University of Theatre, Paris. His focus was: Living Theatre, Grotowski

== Teaching career ==
- 1970 1972 Teacher/intern at the National Institute of Arts, Abidjan
- 1972 – 1975 Teacher of body language at the National Institute of Arts, Abidjan
- 1985 Teacher of Drama, the Lavilliers Bernard School, Paris
- 1985 – 1986 Teacher of Drama, School of Arts and Josephine Baker, Paris
- 1990 Body language/expression training, Paris I, Panthéon Sorbonne University
- 1991 Body language/expression training, Image d'Ailleurs Paris
- 01-02.1992 Training as an actor, staging a play at the Franco-Nigerian Cultural Centre, Niamey
- Sept. 1992 GTRO Actor training, Abidjan
- 2001–2008 Director of the Actors Studio at the Palace of Culture in Abidjan

== Awards ==
List of awards
Year	Film	Awarded for	Organization
1979	Bako, l'autre rive'	Best Actor	Festival de la Francophonie, Nice
1985	Petanqui,|Le Médecin de Gafire,|Suicides	Grand prix d'interprétation	Festival International of Carthage
1987	Le Médecin de Gafire	Best Actor	Culture Festival in Algiers
1988	Healers	Best Film Music Award	Festival de la Francophonie, Martinique
1989	Les Guérisseurs	Voice of Hope Award	FESPACO
1992		Honorary citizen of Louisville, Kentucky, USA	
1997	Roues libres	Best Screenplay Award for Ayala Bakaba and Sidiki Bakaba	Amiens International Film Festival
1999	Les Déconnards	UNESCO Award	MASA Festival in Abidjan
2001	Los Palenqueros,|Cinq Siècles de Solitude	UEMOA Award	
2003		Prix Culturel Africain du Mérite	Rifad (International Network of African Women and the Diaspora)
2005		Ikeda Culture and Education Award	SGI-Côte d'Ivoire
2005	Roues Libres	Best director	l’Association des Professionnels du cinéma de Côte d'Ivoire
2006		Best Cultural Promoter	Cultural Union of Journalists of Côte d'Ivoire
2006		Prix d’Excellence Diplôme d’Honneur	General Council of Abengourou, his hometown
2008		Best Actor for West Africa	la Fondation des artistes de Côte d'Ivoire (FONDACI)
2009		Awarded for his entire career	2nd Pan-African Cultural Festival in Algiers

== Filmography ==
=== Films ===
- 1977 Bako, l'autre rive , directed by: Jacques Champreux, starring: Sidiki Bakaba, Cheik Doukouré and Doura Mané, won the "Prize of the Ecumenical Jury – Special Mention – Jacques Champreux" in 1978 Locarno International Film Festival and "Prix Jean Vigo – Jacques Champreux" in 1978
- 1978 The Savage State, directed by: Francis Girod, starring: Michel Piccoli, Marie-Christine Barrault and Claude Brasseur, won the "Best Sound Award – William Robert Sivel" and nominated for the "Best Editing Award – Geneviève Winding" in 1979 César Awards, France
- 1979 L'Appât du gain, directed by: Jules Takam, starring: Gérard Essomba, Howard Vernon and André Daguenet
- 1981 Le Professionnel, directed by: Georges Lautner, starring: Jean-Paul Belmondo, Jean Desailly, Robert Hossein, won "Best Music Written for a Film – Ennio Morricone" in 1982 Cèsar Awards
- 1982 Le médecin de Gafire, directed by: Mustapha Diop, starring: Sidiki Bakaba, Merlin N'Diagne and Fifi-Dalla Kouyate
- 1983 Suicides, directed by: Jean-Claude Tchuilen, starring: Sidiki Bakaba, Christian Bebebey and Pierre Didy Tchakounte
- 1983 Petanqui, directed by: Kozoloa Yeo, starring: Sidiki Bakaba and Douta Seck
- 1986 Descente aux enfers , directed by: Francis Girod, starring: Claude Brasseur, Sophie Marceau and Betsy Blair
- 1986 Desebagato, directed by: Emmanuel Sanon-Doba, starring: Sidiki Bakaba and Miriam Yago, produced by: Instituto Cubano del Arte e Industrias Cinematográficos (ICAIC), Marie Dubois is nominated as the Best Supporting Actress in 1987 César Awards, France
- 1986 Descente aux enfers, directed by: Francis Girod, starring: Michel Piccoli, Marie-Christine Barrault and Claude Brasseur
- 1987 Campo Thiaroye, directed by: Ousmane Sembene, Thierno Faty Sow, starring: Sidiki Bakaba, Hamed Camara and Philippe Chamelat, in 1988 won the "Children and Cinema Award", "Grand Special Jury Prize", "New Cinema Award", "Sergio Trasatti Award – Special Mention", "Special Golden Ciak" and "UNICEF Award" in 1988 Venice Film Festival
- 1987 Visages de femmes, directed by: Désiré Ecaré, starring: Sidiki Bakaba, Kouadou Brou and Albertine N'Guessan, won the FIPRESCI Prize – Désiré Ecaré in 1985 Cannes Film Festival
- 1988 Les guérisseurs, directed by: Sidiki Bakaba, starring: Georges Benson, Pierre-Loup Rajot and Nayanka Bell, produced by: Afriki Projection, Ministère de la Culture (participation)
- 1990 Mamy Wata, directed by: Moustapha Diop, starring: Philippe Ambrosini, Sidiki Bakaba, Gérard Essomba, Fifi-Dalla Kouyate, Sotigui Kouyaté, Sandra Novik, Umban U'kset, France Zobda
- 1998 Mes quatre dernières volontés, directed by: Angelo Cianci, starring: Carole Martinez, Sidiki Bakaba and Pierre Porquet, duration: 5 min, nominated for the "Best European Short Film/Angelo Cianci" in 1999 Brussels International Film Festival
- 2000 Daresalam, directed by: Issa Coello, starring: Haikal Zakaria, Abdoulaye Ahmat and Gérard Essomba
- 2002 Roues libres, directed by: Sidiki Bakaba, starring: Sidiki Bakaba, Adama Dahico, Placide Bayoro and Daouda Traoré
- 2010 Héritage Perdu, directed by: Christian Lara, starring: Sidiki Bakaba, Philippe Mory and Luc Saint-Eloy

=== TV films ===
- 1981 Un dessert pour Constance, by: Sarah Maldoror, starring: Sidiki Bakaba, Cheik Doukouré and Elias Sherif
- 1982 En votre aimable règlement, by: Jean-Claude Charnay, starring: Christian Parisy, Micky Sébastian and Anne Fontaine
- 1983 L'Aventure ambiguë, directed by: Jacques Champreux for TF1
- 1985 Néo Polar, TV series, starring: Vincent Lindon, Jean-Pierre Léaud and Claude Nougaro
- 1985 L'épi d'or, TV series, directed by: Fabrice Cazeneuve, starring: Jean-Noël Brouté, Sophie Caffarel and Christine Murillo
- 1986 La méthode rose, directed by: Claude de Givray, starring: Jean-Pierre Cassel, Marie-Noëlle Eusèbe and Gérard Caillaud, TF1 Films Production
- 1986 Azizah, la fille du fleuve, directed by: Patrick Jamain, starring: Michel Auclair, Sidiki Bakaba and Kouadou Brou, produced by: Antenne
- 1989 Le triplé gagnant , TV series, starring: Raymond Pellegrin, Thierry Rode and Jean-Michel Martial
- 1992 La Parle, directed by: Sidiki Bakaba
- 1992 L'Anniversaire de Daymio, Afriki Projection production
- 1992 Zoo Story, directed by: Edward Albee, Afriki Projection production
- 1992 Maître Harold, directed by: Athol Furgarth, Afriki Projection production
- 1995 – 1996 L'Empereur Jones, directed by:Eugene O'Neill
- 1995 – 1998 Le Nord est tombé sur la tête
- 1999 Les Déconnards, directed by Koffi Kwahulé
- 2002 C’est ça là même, directed by Sidiki Bakaba
- 2002 Papa Bon Dieu, directed by: Louis Sapin
- 2002 L’homme sur le parapet du pont, directed by: Guy Foissy
- 2002 Fiers Ivoiriens
- 2003 l’Exil d’Albouri, directed by: Cheick Aliou N’dao
- 2004 Monoko-Zohi, Diegou Bailly, Director: Sidiki Bakada
- 2006 Il nous faut l’Amérique, directed by: Koffi Kwahule
- 2007 Îles de Tempête, directed by: Bernard B. Dadié
- 2008 Hêrêmankono, directed by: Diégou Bailly
- 2010 La Malice des hommes, directed by: Jean-Pierre Guingane

=== Documentaries ===
- 1999 Fête de génération d'Abobote, director: Sidiki Bakaba, duration: 26’
- 2000 Los Palenqueros Cimarrons de Colombie
- 2000 Cinq siècles de solitude, directors: Sidiki Bakaba et Blaise Ndjehoya, duration: 52’, producer: Afriki Projection and Absynthe Production, diffusion: CFI, TV5 Afrique, Awards: Prix de l’UMOA au Fespaco 2001 Amiens 2000, Média Nord-Sud 2001, Pan African Film Festival 2001, Images d’ailleurs 2001
- 2002 Côte d'Ivoire, terre d'espérance, a documentary about Afro-Colombia by Blaise N'Dehoya and Sidiki Bakaba Video on YouTube
- 2002 Caravane de la paix
- 2005 La Victoire aux mains nues

=== Filmed theater ===
- 1992 Zoo Story of Edward Albee, director: Abdul Karim, Afriki Projection production
- 1992 Maitre Harold by Athol Furgarth, producer TV 1, production, Afriki Projection production
- 1995 – 1996 L' Emperor Jones by Eugene O'Neill
- 1999 The Déconnards by Koffi Kwahulé
- 2002 Papa Bon Dieu, director: Sidiki Bakaba
- 2003 L’Exil d’Albour, director: Sidiki Bakada
- 2004 Monoko-Zohi, director: Sidiki Bakada
- 2007 Îles de Tempête, director: Sidiki Bakada
- 2008 Hèrèmankono, director: Sidiki Bakaba
- 2010 La Malice des Hommes, director: Sidiki Bakaba

== See also ==
- List of Ivorian films
- Cinema of Africa
- List of directors and producers of documentaries
