= Akissi Delta =

Ivorian actress and filmmaker

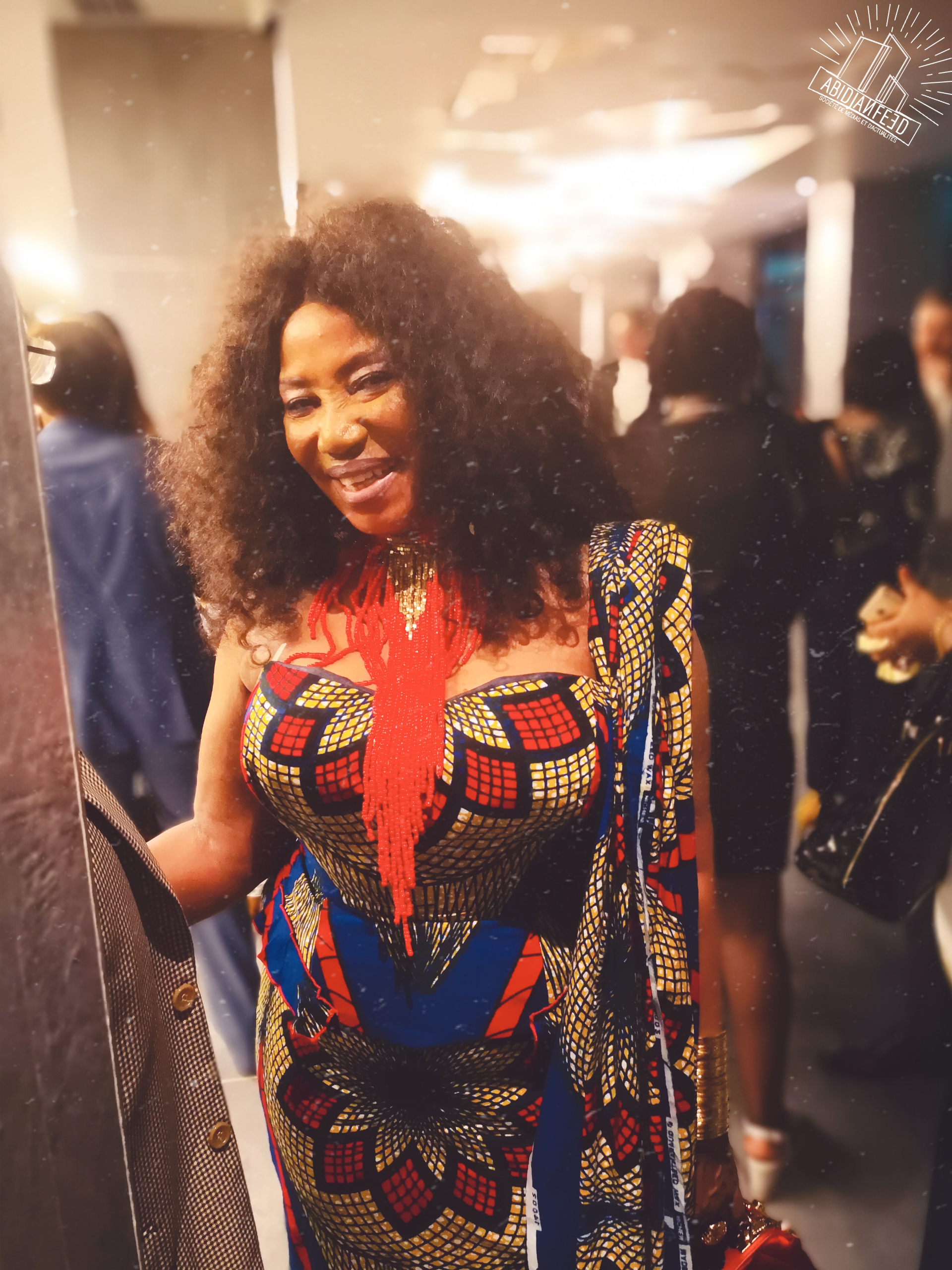
- Born: Loukou Akisse Delphine; 5th of March, 1960; Dimbokro
- Citizenship: Ivorian
- Occupations: Liberian; Actress; filmmaker
- Known for: Comment ça va [How are you], Bouka, Joli cœur [Sweet heart]Au nom du Christ [In the name of Christ], Rue Princesse, Afrique, mon Afrique [Africa, My Africa], Bienvenue au Gondwana [Welcome to Gondwana]

Akissi Delta also known as Loukou Akisse Delphine (born 1960) is an Ivorian actress and filmmaker.

== Life ==
Born in Dimbokro on 5 March 1960, Akissi Delta never attended school. Starting as a dancer and model, she acted in Léonard Groguhet's Comment ça va and in several of Henri Duparc's films. In 2002 she created the television series Ma Famille.

== Filmography ==
=== As actor ===
- Comment ça va [How are you], dir. Léonard Groguhet, 1987
- Bouka, dir. Roger Gnoan M'Bala, 1988
- Joli cœur [Sweet heart], dir. Henri Duparc, 1992
- Au nom du Christ [In the name of Christ], dir. Roger Gnoan M'Bala, 1993
- Rue Princesse, dir. Henri Duparc, 1993
- Afrique, mon Afrique [Africa, My Africa], dir. Idrissa Ouédraogo, 1994
- Bienvenue au Gondwana [Welcome to Gondwana], dir. Mamane, 2016

=== As director ===
- Les secrets d'Akissi
- Ma famille, 2002–07
