= Amélie Wabehi =

Ivorian actress and comedian

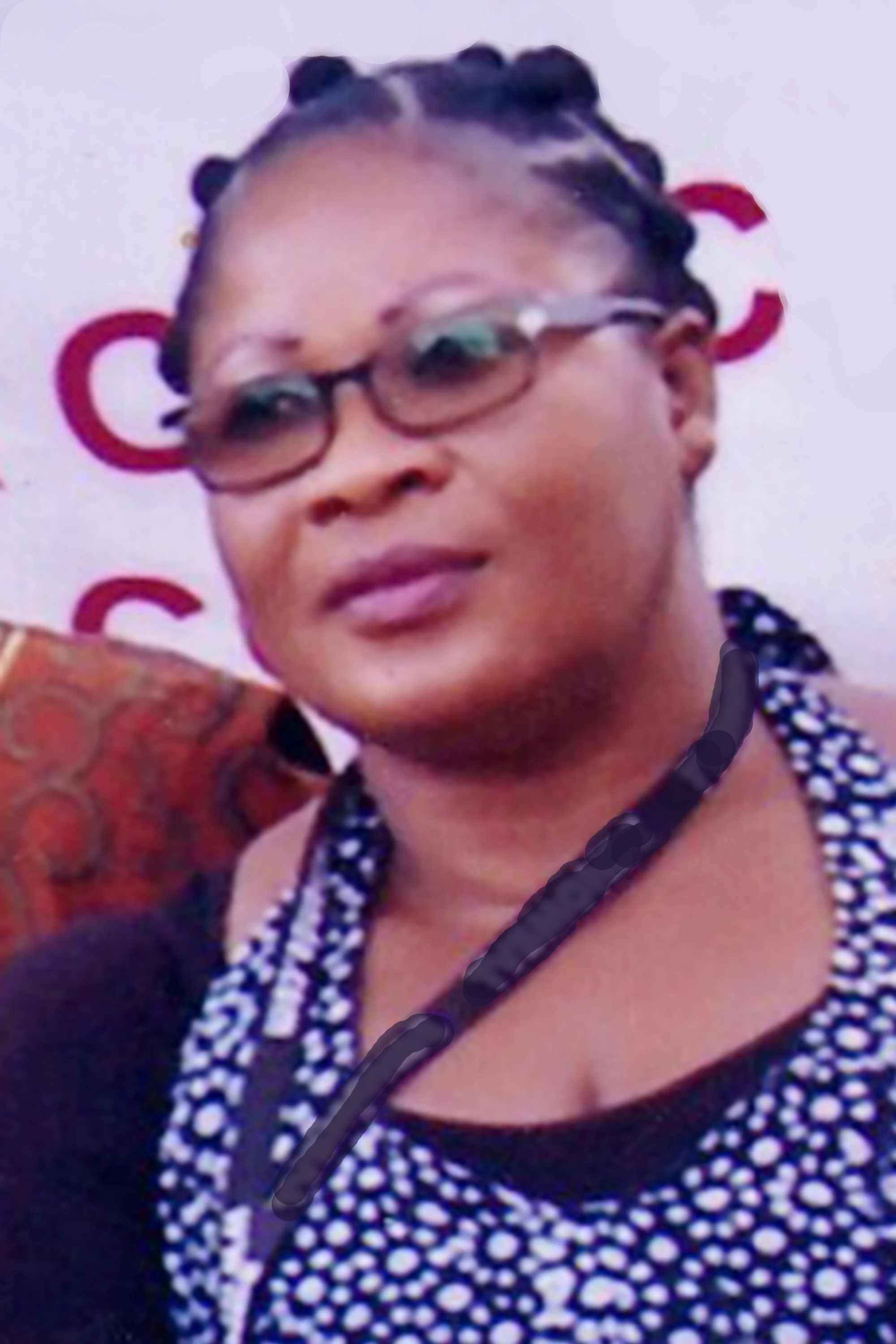
- Born: Amélie Wabehi Zadjé
- Occupations: Actress, comedian
- Years active: 1994-present
- Television: Ma Famille

Amélie Wabehi Zadjé is an Ivorian actress and comedian.

== Biography ==
Wabehi began acting in theatrical productions in primary school, playing Sarah, the wife of Abraham in a biblical play. She made her professional acting debut in 1992 with the Guignols d'Abidjan troupe. In 1994, Wabehi performed in her first film, Coupable tradition. She starred in the TV series Ma Famille in 2002. Her role as Amélie brought her fame in the Ivory Coast. In 2007, Wabehi starred in the play Dragonnier.

Wabehi has worked closely with Akissi Delta. In 2018, Wabehi criticized the Ivorian Minister of Culture Maurice Bandaman of failing to keep his promise of disbursing 100 million CFA francs promised to Akissi Delta for film production. According to Wabehi, the indifference from the authorities was marked by a lack of openness, mentoring, and visibility for actors in the film industry. Due to the government's incompetence, the TV film Ma grande Famille was not completed. In 2020, Wabehi participated in the second edition of the "Drôles de Femmes" show in Abidjan.

Wabehi has one son. She is a Christian and frequently reads Bible passages to meditate. Wabehi has criticized the Ivory Coast's law against adultery, stating that if her husband cheated on her, she would question herself rather than seek prison time for him.

== Partial filmography ==
- 1994: Coupable tradition
- 2002: Ma Famille (TV series)
- 2008: Super flics (TV series)
