= Angéline Nadié =

Ivorian actress (1968–2021)

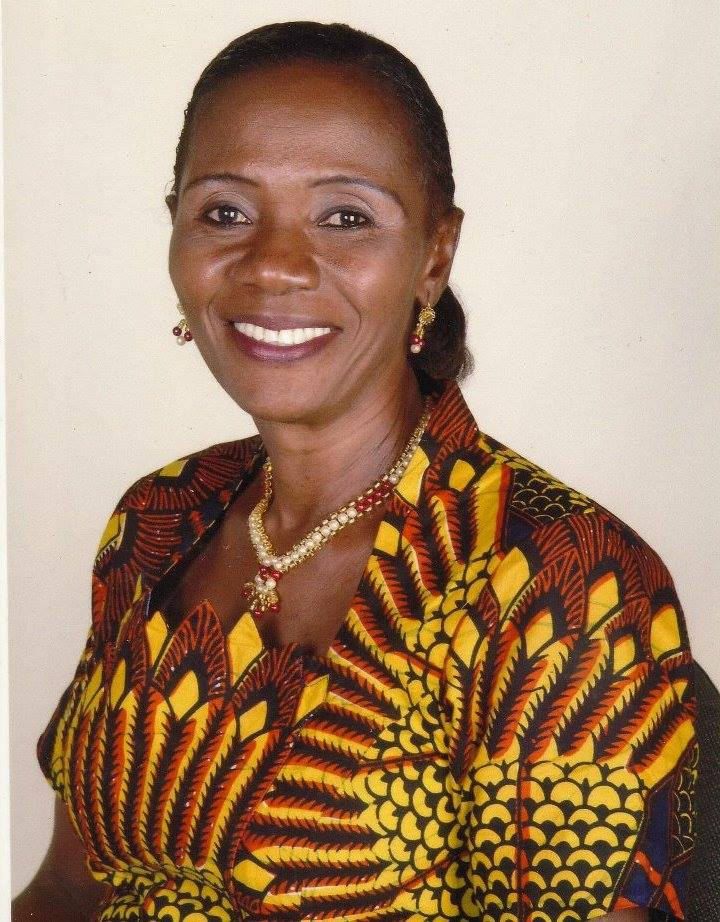
- Born: 1 January 1968
- Died: 17 July 2021 (aged 53)
- Occupation: Actress

Angéline Nadié (1 January 1968 – 17 July 2021) was an Ivorian actress. She was best known for her role as the evil mother of Michel Bohiri's character in Ma Famille.

Nadié had been suffering from cancer for three years prior to her death. In 2018, assistance in the form of a government pension had been publicly requested from Ivorian Minister of Culture Maurice Bandama.

== Filmography ==
- Ma Famille (2002–2007)
- Marié du net 1 (2005)
- Marié du net 2 (2005)
- Les Oiseaux du ciel (2006)
