= Albertine N'Guessan =

Ivorian actress

- Born: Albertine N'Guessan Zebou Lou
- Died: April 22, 2016; Oumé
- Education: National Institute of Arts
- Occupation: Actress
- Years active: 1981-2016
- Notable work: Ablakon

Albertine N'Guessan Zebou Lou (died 22 April 2016) was an Ivorian actress.

== Biography ==
N'Guessan trained at the National Institute of Arts (INA) in Abidjan. In 1972, she performed alongside Bitty Moro, Aboubakar Cyprien Touré and Noël Guié in the play Les gens des marais, written by Wolé Soyinka and directed by Jean Favarel. In 1977, N'Guessan starred in The Tragedy of King Christophe by Aimé Césaire, directed by Bitty Moro. Between 1986 and 1987, she acted in the scenic production by Kodjo Ébouclé of Une femme à rent, a play by François Campeaux.

In 1984, N'Guessan starred in Ablakon, directed by Désiré Ecaré. The following year, she performed in Visages de femmes by the same director.

In 2000, N'Guessan played the mother of Ossei in Adanggaman, directed by Roger Gnoan Mbala. She appeared in the TV series Sah Sandra in 2009, playing the great-grandmother of Sassi. N'Guessan taught at the National Institute of Arts and Cultural Action in Abidjan before deciding to retire. She was considered to be one of the foremost actresses in Côte d'Ivoire. In June 2015, N'Guessan was awarded the order of merit of culture and the arts in Côte d'Ivoire.

N'Guessan died on 22 April 2016 in Oumé, after a prolonged illness.

== Filmography ==
- 1981 : Adja Tio : À cause de l'héritage
- 1984 : Ablakon
- 1985 : Visages de femmes
- 2000 : Adanggaman
- 2007 : Nafi (TV series)
- 2009 : Sah Sandra (TV series)

== See also ==
- Aimé Césaire
- Visages de femmes
- Roger Gnoan Mbala.
