= 1985 Cannes Film Festival =

- Official poster of the 38th Cannes Film Festival, a tribute to English photographer Eadweard Muybridge.
- Opening film: Witness
- Closing film: The Emerald Forest
- Location: Cannes, France
- Founded: 1946
- Awards: Palme d'Or: When Father Was Away on Business
- No. of films: 20 (In Competition)
- Festival date: 8 May 1985 – 20 May 1985
- Website: festival-cannes.com/en

Cannes Film Festival
- 1986 1984

The 38th Cannes Film Festival took place from 8 to 20 May 1985. Czechoslovak filmmaker Miloš Forman served as jury president for the main competition. Yugoslavian filmmaker Emir Kusturica won the Palme d'Or, the festival's top prize, for the drama film When Father Was Away on Business.

The festival paid a tribute to American actor James Stewart and screened a restored version of his 1954 film The Glenn Miller Story, directed by Anthony Mann.

The festival opened with Witness by Peter Weir, and closed with The Emerald Forest by John Boorman.

== Juries ==
=== Main competition ===
- Miloš Forman, Czechoslovak filmmaker – Jury President
- Néstor Almendros, Spanish cinematographer
- Jorge Amado, Brazilian author
- Mauro Bolognini, Italian director
- Claude Imbert, French journalist
- Sarah Miles, British actress
- Michel Perez, French
- Mo Rothman, American producer
- Francis Veber, French filmmaker and producer
- Edwin Zbonek, Austrian filmmaker

=== Camera d'Or ===
- Bernard Jubard - Jury President
- Lorenzo Codelli, journalist
- Peter Cowie, British film historian and author
- Joël Magny, film critic
- Bertrand Van Effenterre, French filmmaker
- Jose Vieira Marques, cinephile

== Official selection ==
=== In Competition ===
The following feature films competed for the Palme d'Or:

English title	Original title	Director(s)	Production country
Adieu Bonaparte	وداعا بونابرت	Youssef Chahine	Egypt, France
Birdy		Alan Parker	United States
Bliss		Ray Lawrence	Australia
The Coca-Cola Kid		Dušan Makavejev	Australia
Cop au Vin	Poulet au vinaigre	Claude Chabrol	France
Colonel Redl	Oberst Redl	István Szabó	Hungary, West Germany, Austria
Derborence		Francis Reusser	Switzerland, France
Détective		Jean-Luc Godard	France
Farewell to the Ark	さらば箱舟	Shūji Terayama	Japan
Insignificance		Nicolas Roeg	United Kingdom
Joshua Then and Now		Ted Kotcheff	Canada
Kiss of the Spider Woman	O Beijo da Mulher Aranha	Héctor Babenco	Brazil, United States
The Official Story	La historia oficial	Luis Puenzo	Argentina
Madman at War	Scemo di guerra	Dino Risi	Italy, France
Mask		Peter Bogdanovich	United States
Mishima: A Life in Four Chapters		Paul Schrader	United States, Japan
Pale Rider		Clint Eastwood	United States
Rendez-vous		André Téchiné	France
The Two Lives of Mattia Pascal	Le due vite di Mattia Pascal	Mario Monicelli	Italy
When Father Was Away on Business	Отац на службеном путу	Emir Kusturica	Yugoslavia

=== Un Certain Regard ===
The following films were selected for the Un Certain Regard section:

English title	Original title	Director(s)	Production country
A.K.		Chris Marker	France
Dear, Dearest, Beloved, Unique...	Милый, дорогой, любимый, единственный	Dinara Asanova	Soviet Union
Il diavolo sulle colline		Vittorio Cottafavi	Italy
Empty Quarter: A Woman in Africa	Une femme en Afrique	Raymond Depardon	France
Fire Festival	火まつり	Mitsuo Yanagimachi	Japan
Heritage	Dediščina	Matjaž Klopčič	Yugoslavia
Latino		Haskell Wexler	United States
The Malady of Death	Das Mal des Todes	Peter Handke	Austria
Monsieur de Pourceaugnac		Michel Mitrani	France
The Mystery of Alexina	Le Mystère Alexina	René Féret	France
Oriana		Fina Torres	Venezuela
Padre nuestro		Francisco Regueiro	Spain
A Private Function		Malcolm Mowbray	United Kingdom
Tea in the Harem	Le Thé au harem d'Archimède	Mehdi Charef	France
Tokyo-Ga		Wim Wenders	United States, West Germany
When Night Falls	עד סוף הלילה	Eitan Green	Israel

=== Out of Competition ===
The following films were selected to be screened out of competition:

English title	Original title	Director(s)	Production country
The Emerald Forest (closing film)		John Boorman	United Kingdom
The Glenn Miller Story (1954)		Anthony Mann	United States
Jumping	Springen	Jean-Pierre De Decker	Belgium
Die Nacht		Hans-Jürgen Syberberg	West Germany
Night Magic		Lewis Furey	Canada, France
The Purple Rose of Cairo		Woody Allen	United States
The Satin Slipper	Le soulier de Satin	Manoel de Oliveira	Portugal
Steaming		Joseph Losey	United Kingdom
Witness (opening film)		Peter Weir	United States

=== Short Films Competition ===
The following short films competed for the Short Film Palme d'Or:

- L'anniversaire de Georges by Patrick Traon
- Mariage (Jenitba) by Slav Bakalov and Rumen Petkov
- Stop by Krzysztof Kiwerski
- Tusagi by Bondo Shoshitaishvili

== Parallel sections ==
=== International Critics' Week ===
The following feature films were screened for the 24th International Critics' Week (24e Semaine de la Critique):

- Le Temps détruit by Pierre Beuchot (France)
- Faces of Women (Visages de femmes) by Desiré Ecaré (Ivory Coast)
- Kolp by Roland Suso Richter (West Germany)
- Vertiges by Christine Laurent (France)
- The Color of Blood by Bill Duke (United States)
- Fucha by Michał Dudziewicz (Poland)
- A Canary Cage by Pavel Chukhray (Soviet Union)
- A Marvada Carne by André Klotzel (Brazil)

=== Directors' Fortnight ===
The following films were screened for the 1985 Directors' Fortnight (Quinzaine des Réalizateurs):

- A Flash of Green by Victor Nuñez
- Crossover Dreams by Leon Ichaso
- Da Capo by Pekka Lehto, Pirjo Honkasalo
- Dance with a Stranger by Mike Newell
- Desperately Seeking Susan by Susan Seidelman
- Dim Sum: A Little Bit of Heart by Wayne Wang
- Love on the Pyramids Plateau (Al Hob Fawk Habadet al Haram) by Atef El Tayeb
- A Suspended Life (Ghazal el-Banat) by Jocelyne Saab
- Blue Mountains by Eldar Shengelaia
- Impiegati by Pupi Avati
- The City and the Dogs (La ciudad y los perros) by Francisco J. Lombardi
- La noche más hermosa by Manuel Gutiérrez Aragón
- Les anges by Ridha Behi
- Lieber Karl by Maria Knilli
- Megfelelo Ember Kenyes Feladatra by János Kovácsi
- O Erotas tou Odyssea by Vassilis Vafeas
- The Funeral (Osōshiki) by Juzo Itami
- The Innocent by John Mackenzie

== Official Awards ==
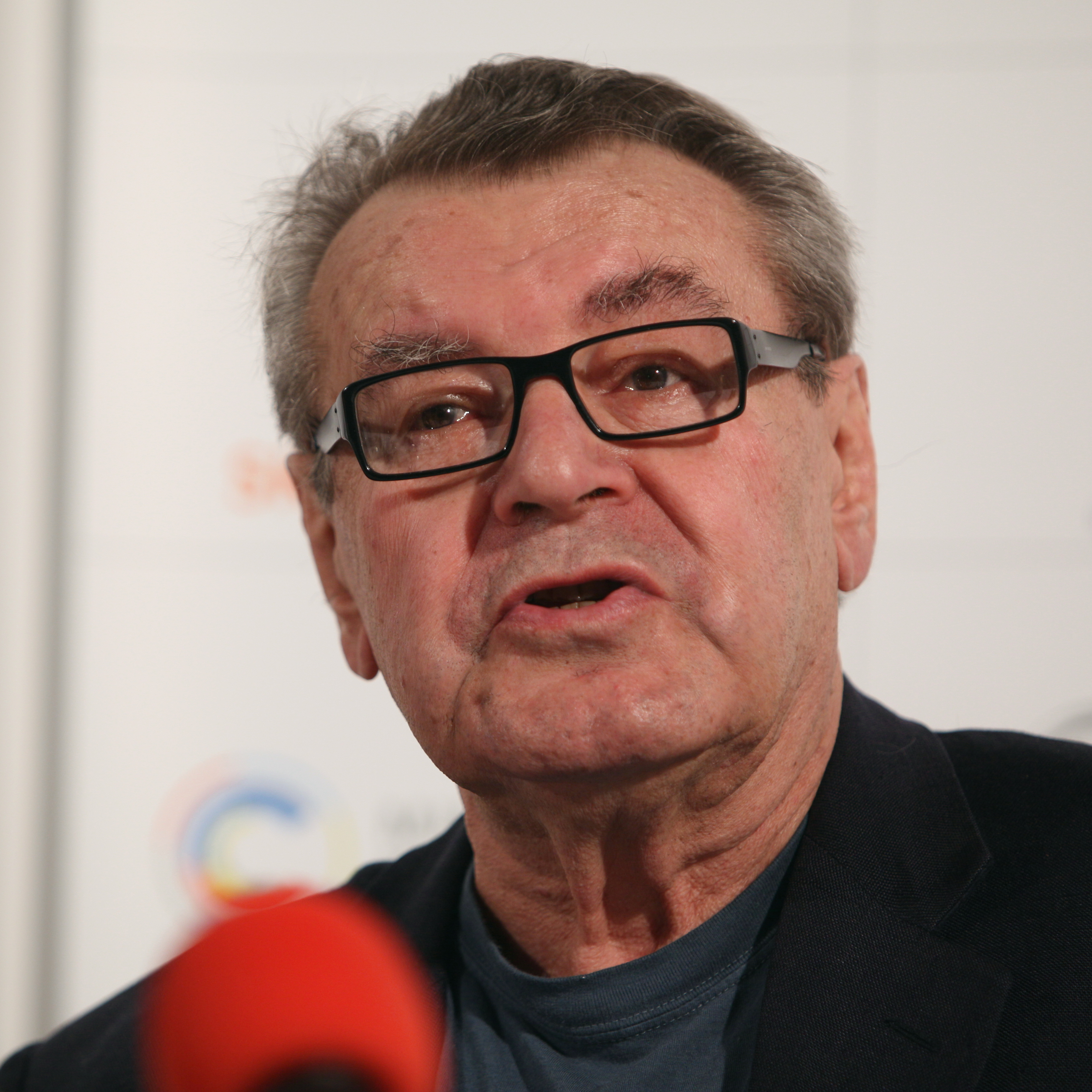
Miloš Forman, Jury President

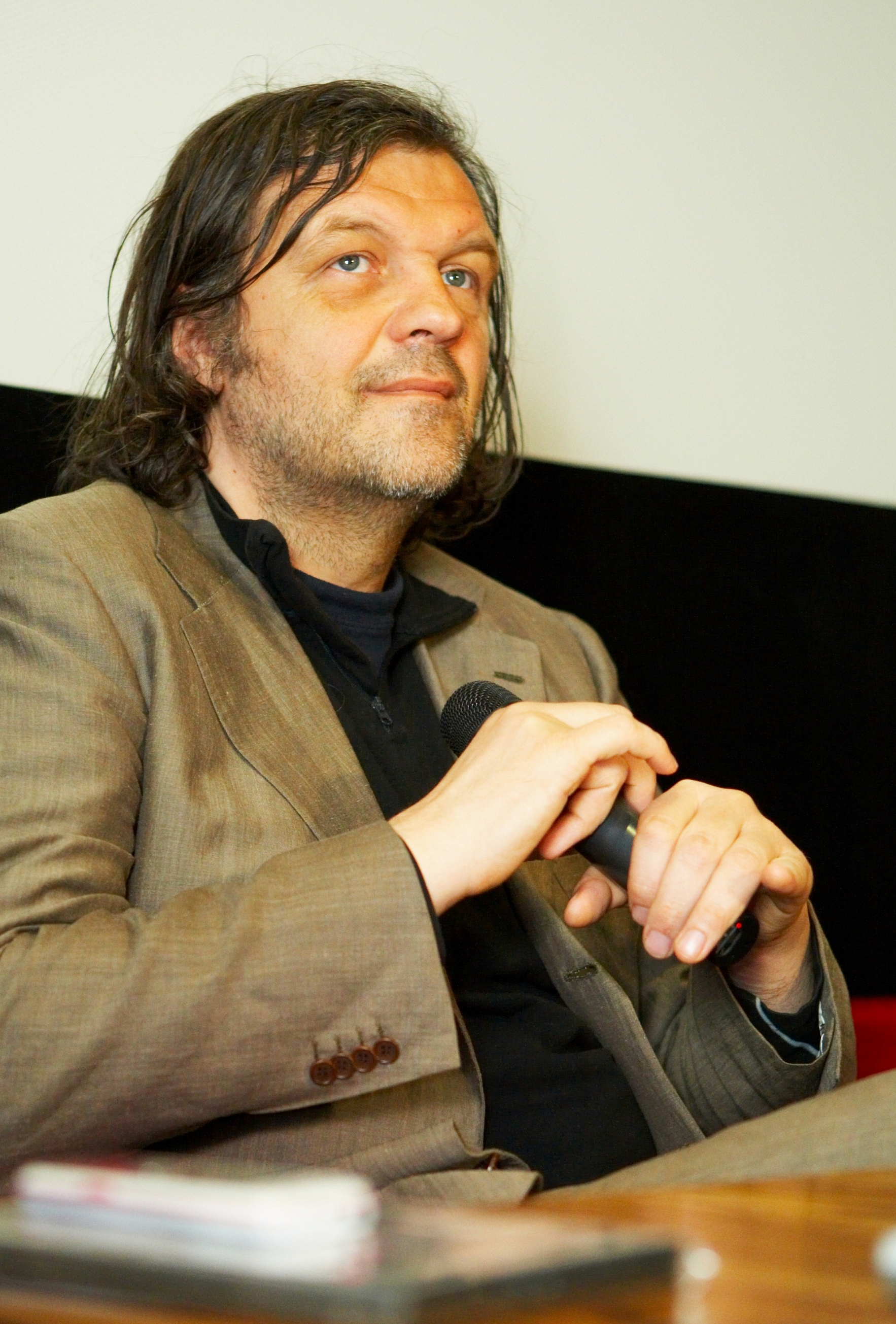
Emir Kusturica, Palme d'Or winner

=== In Competition ===
- Palme d'Or: When Father Was Away on Business by Emir Kusturica
- Grand Prix: Birdy by Alan Parker
- Best Director: André Téchiné for Rendez-vous
- Best Actress:
  - Norma Aleandro for The Official Story
  - Cher for Mask
- Best Actor: William Hurt for Kiss of the Spider Woman
- Best Artistic Contribution: Paul Schrader for Mishima: A Life in Four Chapters
- Jury Prize: Colonel Redl by István Szabó

=== Caméra d'Or ===
- Oriana by Fina Torres

=== Short Film Palme d'Or ===
- Mariage by Slav Bakalov and Rumen Petkov

== Independent Awards ==
=== FIPRESCI Prizes ===
- When Father Was Away on Business by Emir Kusturica (In competition)
- The Purple Rose of Cairo by Woody Allen (Out of competition)
- Faces of Women by Desiré Ecaré (International Critics' Week)

=== Commission Supérieure Technique ===
- Technical Grand Prize: Insignificance by Nicolas Roeg

=== Prize of the Ecumenical Jury ===
- The Official Story by Norma Aleandro

=== Award of the Youth ===
- Foreign Film: Dance with a Stranger by Mike Newell
- French Film: Tea in the Harem by Mehdi Charef

== Media ==
- INA: Opening of the 1985 Festival (commentary in French)
- INA: List of winners of the 1985 festival (commentary in French)
