= Matjaž Klopčič =

Slovenian film director

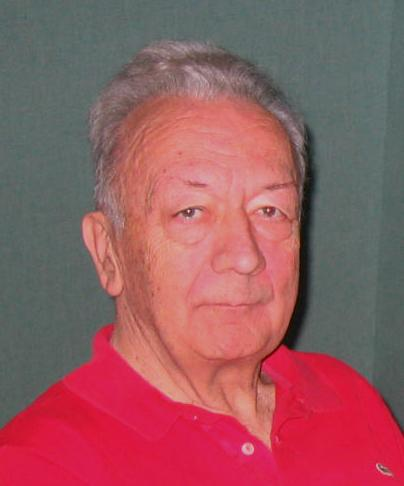
- Klopčič in 2005
- Born: 4 December 1934; Ljubljana, Slovenia
- Died: 15 December 2007 (aged 73); Ljubljana, Slovenia
- Occupations: Film director Screenwriter
- Years active: 1963–1996

Matjaž Klopčič (4 December 1934 – 15 December 2007) was a Slovenian film director and screenwriter. He directed 28 films between 1959 and 2005. His film Heritage (Slovene: Dediščina) was screened in the Un Certain Regard section at the 1985 Cannes Film Festival. Many of his films starred Polde Bibič.

He was the son of the poet Mile Klopčič, and the nephew of the Communist activist and historian France Klopčič.

== Selected filmography ==
- On the Sunny Side of the Street (1959), (short)
- The Widowhood of Karolina Zasler (1976)
- Heritage (1984)
- My Dad, the Socialist Kulak (1987)
