= Canton of Saint-Avold =

Coordinates: 49.11°N 6.71°E

The canton of Saint-Avold is an administrative division of the Moselle department, northeastern France. It was created at the French canton reorganisation which came into effect in March 2015. Its seat is in Saint-Avold.

It consists of the following communes:

- Altviller
- Carling
- Diesen
- Folschviller
- L'Hôpital
- Lachambre
- Macheren
- Porcelette
- Saint-Avold
- Valmont
