= Lachambre =

- Commune
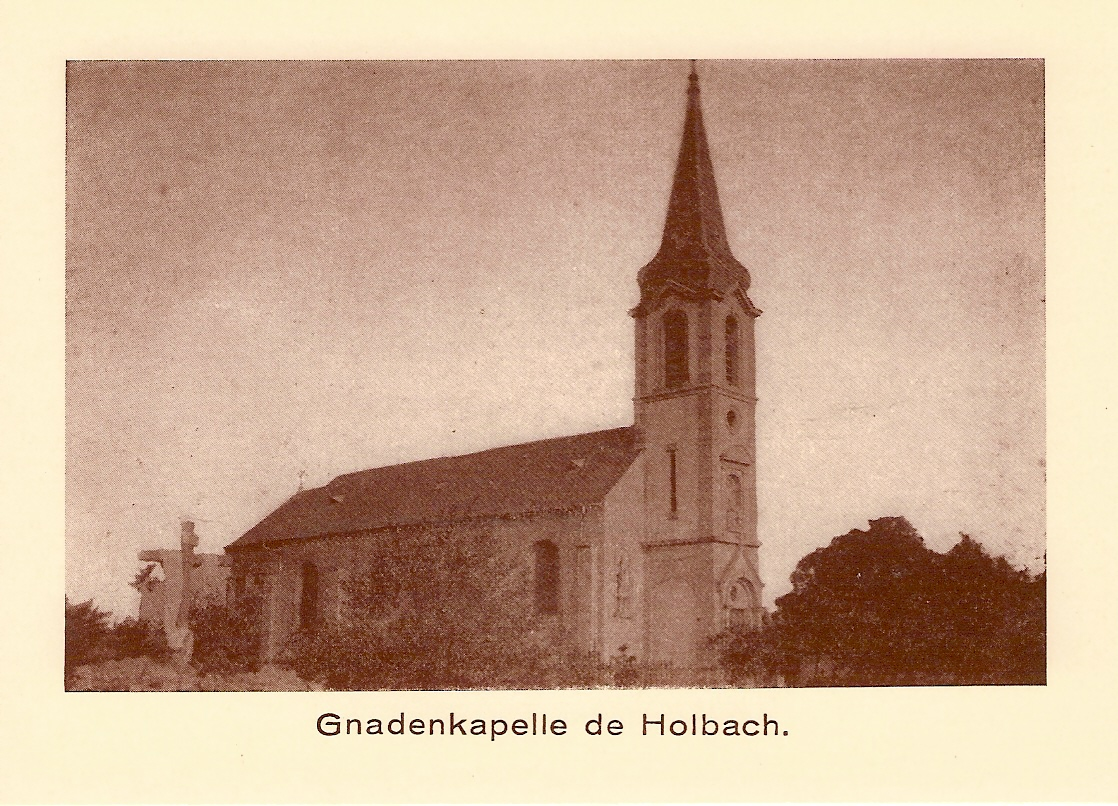
- The old chapel of Holbach, destroyed in 1940

- Coat of arms
- Location of Lachambre
- Location within France Location within Grand Est
- Coordinates: 49°04′56″N 6°44′43″E
- Country: France
- Region: Grand Est
- Department: Moselle
- Arrondissement: Forbach-Boulay-Moselle
- Canton: Saint-Avold
- Intercommunality: CA Saint-Avold Synergie

Government
  - Mayor (2021–2026): Sébastien Clamme
- Area^{1}: 7.86 km^{2} (3.03 sq mi)
- Elevation: 230 m (750 ft)
- Highest elevation: 340 m (1,120 ft)
- Lowest elevation: 250 m (820 ft)
- Population (2023): 906
  - Density: 115/km^{2} (299/sq mi)
- Time zone: UTC+01:00 (CET)
  - Summer (DST): UTC+02:00 (CEST)
- INSEE/Postal code: 57373 /57730
- ^{1} French Land Register data, which excludes lakes, ponds, glaciers > 1 km^{2} (0.386 sq mi or 247 acres) and river estuaries.

Lachambre (French pronunciation: [laʃɑ̃bʁ]; German: Kammern) is a commune in the Moselle department in Grand Est in north-eastern France.

== See also ==
- Communes of the Moselle department
