= Mile Klopčič =

Slovenian poet and translator

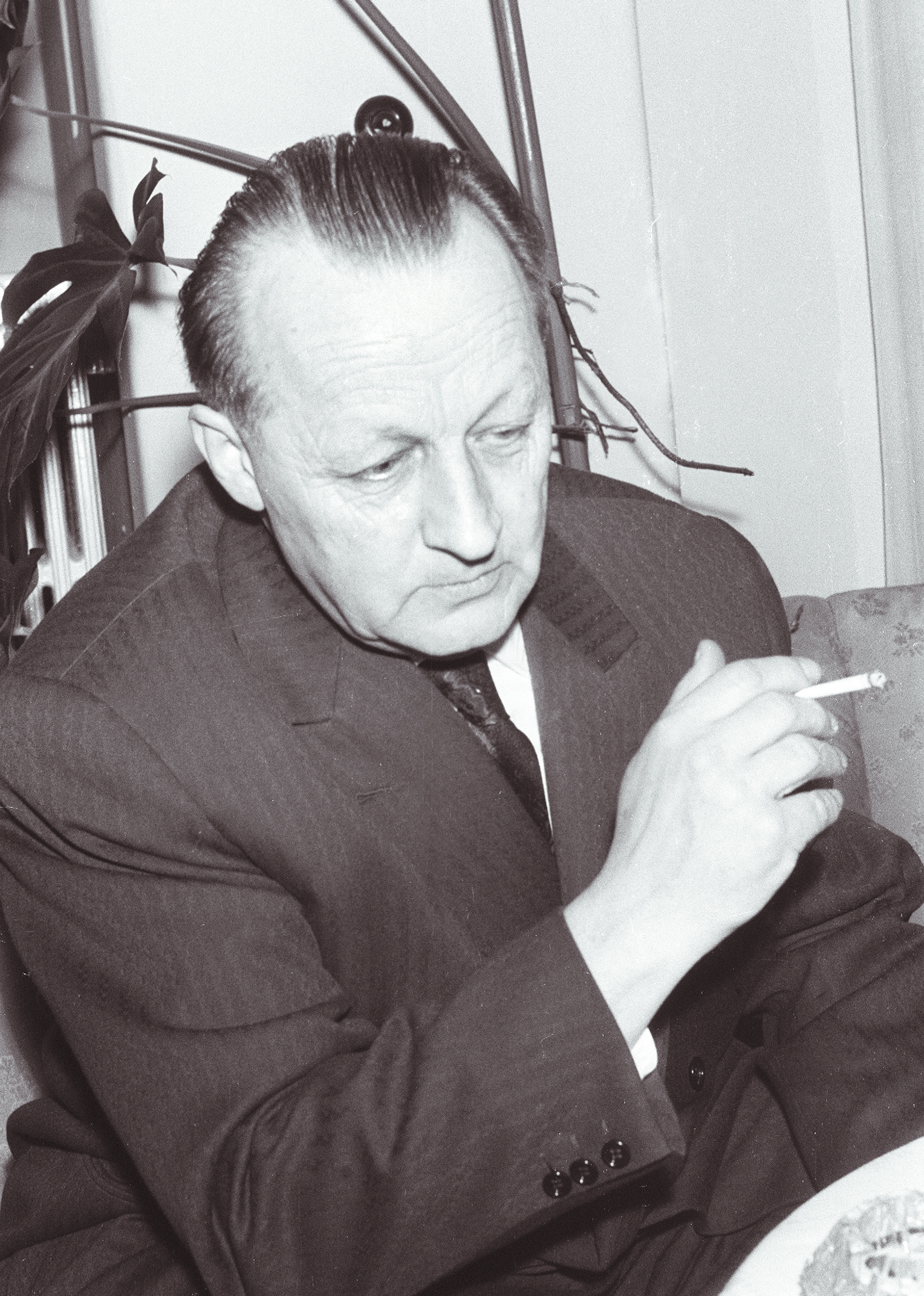
Mile Klopčič in 1961

Mile Klopčič (16 November 1905 - 19 March 1984) was a Slovenian poet and translator. Together with Tone Seliškar, he is considered as the foremost representative of Slovene social realist poetry of the 1930s and 1940s.

He was born in the town of L'Hôpital (German: Spittel), France, then part of the German province of Alsace-Lorraine, where his father worked as industrial workers. At the outbreak of World War I, the family moved to the industrial town of Zagorje ob Savi. He attended high school in Ljubljana. In 1920, he joined the Communist Party of Yugoslavia. During the reign of King Alexander I of Yugoslavia, he was imprisoned as a political opponent of the regime. During World War II, he joined the partisan resistance, and became the chairman of the Commission for Culture in the Slovenian National Liberation Council (SNOS). After the war, he worked mostly as a translator. Among other, he translated works of Heinrich Heine, Pushkin, Lermontov and Korney Chukovsky into Slovene.

Klopčič is most renowned for his pre-World War II poetry, consisting of dry yet highly descriptions of the daily life of miners and industrial workers.

He was the brother of the Communist activist and historian France Klopčič, and father of the film director Matjaž Klopčič and the violinist Rok Klopčič.
