= France Klopčič =

Slovenian historian, writer, translator and Communist political activist

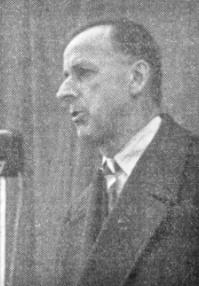
France Klopčič was addressing people at the conference

France Klopčič (25 October 1903 – 25 April 1986) was a Slovenian historian, writer, translator and Communist political activist.

He was born in the town of L'Hôpital (German: Spittel), France, then part of the German province of Alsace-Lorraine, where his father worked as an industrial worker. In 1909, the family moved to the industrial town of Zagorje ob Savi. He attended high school in Ljubljana. Already as a teenager, he became a member of the Communist Party of Yugoslavia, and became one of the leaders of the Communist Youth in Slovenia. During the 1920s, he worked as a journalist for left wing newspapers. He strongly opposed Yugoslav centralism, and advocated the establishment of a socialist and federal Yugoslavia. In 1924, he took part in the armed clash between the Communist-organized workers' units and members of the Yugoslav nationalist militiamen of the ORJUNA organization that took place in the industrial town of Trbovlje. Between 1926 and 1929, he was in the leadership of the Slovenian section of the Yugoslav Communist Party. During this period, he was arrested and imprisoned by the Yugoslav authorities on two occasions.

In 1930, he emigrated to the Soviet Union. In the mid-1930s, he was accused of counter-revolutionary activity, and imprisoned. He was released in 1945, but had to remain in the Soviet Union because of his disapproval of the Informbiro declaration. In 1956, he was released at the request of the Yugoslav authorities.

After his return to Yugoslavia, he settled in Ljubljana, Slovenia, and became a professional historian, focusing on the history of the worker movement in Slovenia, and on the history of the Communist Party. Together with Dušan Kermavner, he was one of the foremost Communist historians of the Socialist movement in Slovenia. He was also vocal in the defence of the federalist system in Yugoslavia and of the autonomy of the single Yugoslav republics against centralist pressures.

He was also a prolific translator from Russian into Slovene. Among other, he translated several works of Lenin and Mayakovsky. In 1964, he translated Solzhenitsyn's novel One Day in the Life of Ivan Denisovich.

He died in Ljubljana.

He was the brother of the social realist poet Mile Klopčič, and the uncle of the film director Matjaž Klopčič.
