= Bouka (film) =

- Directed by: Roger Gnoan M'Bala
- Written by: Roger Gnoan M'Bala
- Produced by: Abyssa Films
- Starring: Akissi Delta; Félix Gazekagnon; Drissa Kone
- Cinematography: Paul Kodjo
- Edited by: Ahoussy Djangoye
- Music by: Martial Anney
- Distributed by: Marfilmes
- Release date: 1988
- Running time: 90 minutes
- Country: Ivory Coast
- Language: French

Bouka is a 1988 Ivorian drama film directed by Roger Gnoan M'Bala.

== Synopsis ==
Bouka is a gifted young teenager. He lives with his parents in a village and forms with them a solid family. His father gives him a traditional education close to nature. Unfortunately this happiness will be troubled by the brutal death of the father… Remained widow Bouka's mother will suffer the consequences of a relentless traditional principle. She becomes the new wife of Amontchi, her late husband's nephew, Bouka doesn't accepts this new condition of her mother. He suspects his stepfather to be involved in his father's death. He stops to go to school and organizes a gang in the forest. In this tormented atmosphere, he develops a mortal hate towards his stepfather, whom he ends up killing using the teachings of his late father.

The film is based on the short story "Jeux dangereux", from the 1974 book Les Bannis du village, by Ivorian filmmaker and writer Timité Bassori.

According to M'Bissine Diop, Bouka is the first film where Roger Gnoan M'Bala deals with the issue of the Western influence on local culture.

== Awards ==
- 1st Prize at Vues d'Afrique, Canada (1989)
- 1st Prize at Festival de Belfort, France (1989)
- Sankofa Prize at FESPACO - Panafrican Film and Television Festival of Ouagadougou, Burkina Faso (1989)
- Prize ID des Arts et Lettres, Ivory Coast (1989)
- Public Prize at Festival d'Angers, France (1989)
