= L'Hôpital, Moselle =

L'Hôpital
- Commune
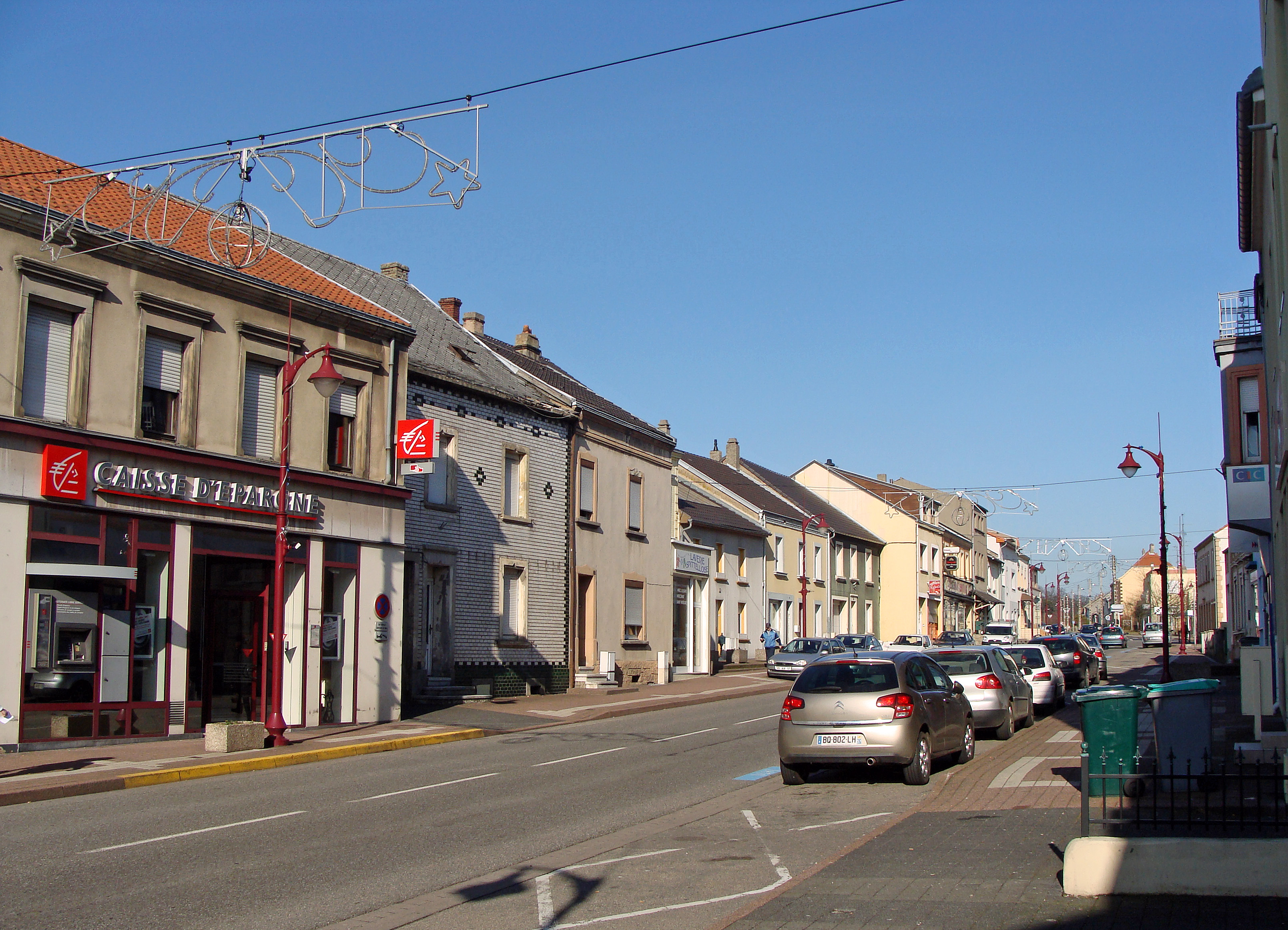
- The town centre of L'Hôpital

- Coat of arms
- Location of L'Hôpital
- Location within France Location within Grand Est
- Coordinates: 49°10′00″N 6°44′00″E
- Country: France
- Region: Grand Est
- Department: Moselle
- Arrondissement: Forbach-Boulay-Moselle
- Canton: Saint-Avold
- Intercommunality: CA Saint-Avold Synergie

Government
  - Mayor (2020–2026): Emmanuel Schuler
- Area^{1}: 3.99 km^{2} (1.54 sq mi)
- Elevation: 260 m (850 ft)
- Highest elevation: 300 m (980 ft)
- Lowest elevation: 220 m (720 ft)
- Population (2023): 5,183
  - Density: 1,300/km^{2} (3,360/sq mi)
- Time zone: UTC+01:00 (CET)
  - Summer (DST): UTC+02:00 (CEST)
- INSEE/Postal code: 57336 /57490
- Website: http://www.ville-lhopital.fr/
- ^{1} French Land Register data, which excludes lakes, ponds, glaciers > 1 km^{2} (0.386 sq mi or 247 acres) and river estuaries.

L'Hôpital (French pronunciation: [lopital]; German: Spittel) is a commune in the Moselle department in Grand Est in north-eastern France.

It is the birthplace of the Slovenian author Mile Klopčič and historian France Klopčič.

== Population ==
Historical population
Year	Pop.	±% p.a.
1968	7,181	—
1975	6,395	−1.64%
1982	6,567	+0.38%
1990	6,385	−0.35%
1999	5,990	−0.71%
2007	5,518	−1.02%
2012	5,423	−0.35%
2017	5,350	−0.27%
2023	5,183	−0.53%
Source: INSEE

== See also ==
- Communes of the Moselle department
