= Carling, Moselle =

Carling
- Commune
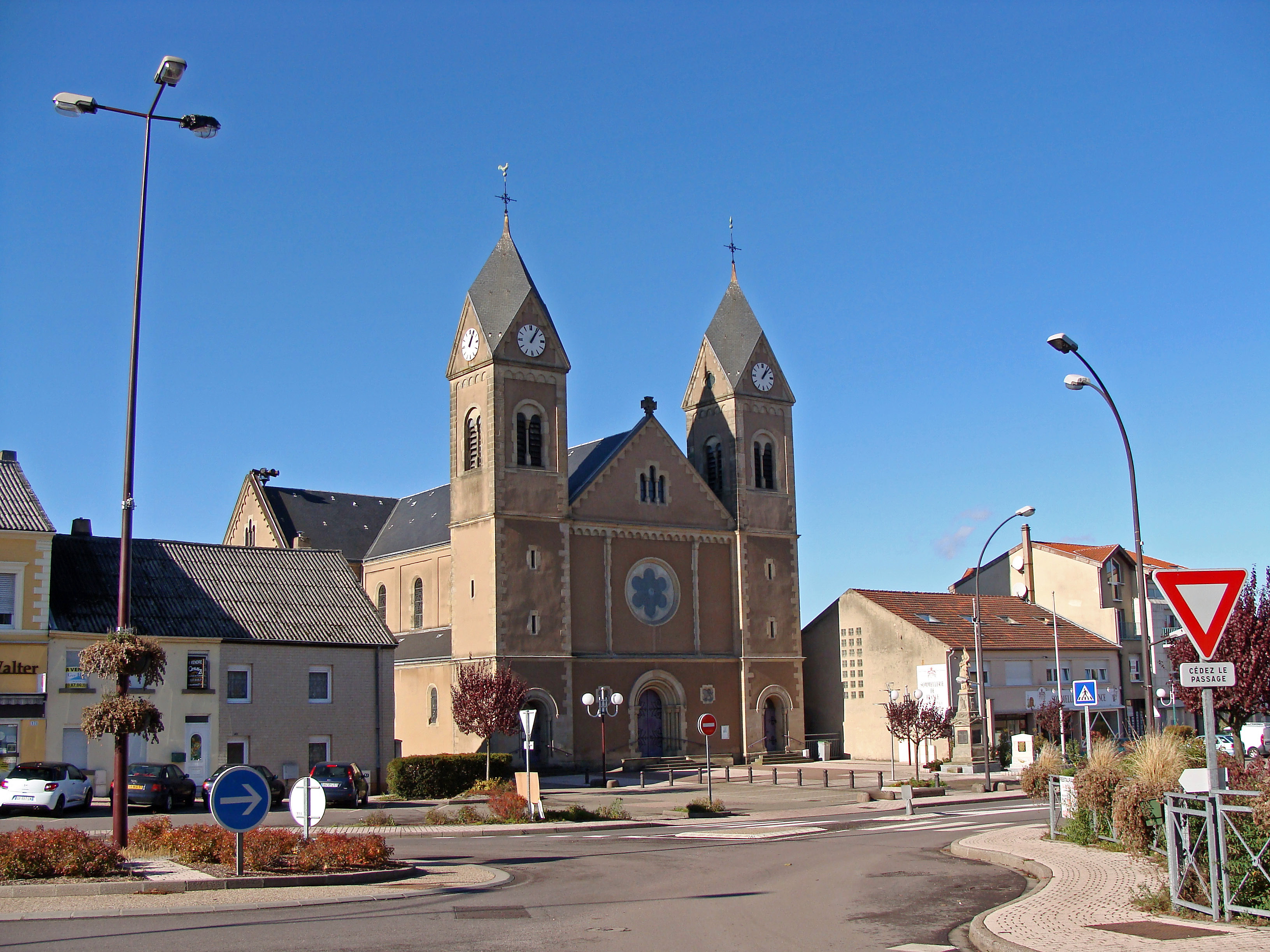
- The church in Carling

- Coat of arms
- Location of Carling
- Location within France Location within Grand Est
- Coordinates: 49°10′02″N 6°43′00″E
- Country: France
- Region: Grand Est
- Department: Moselle
- Arrondissement: Forbach-Boulay-Moselle
- Canton: Saint-Avold
- Intercommunality: CA Saint-Avold Synergie

Government
  - Mayor (2020–2026): Gaston Adier
- Area^{1}: 2.67 km^{2} (1.03 sq mi)
- Elevation: 240 m (790 ft)
- Highest elevation: 267 m (876 ft)
- Lowest elevation: 228 m (748 ft)
- Population (2023): 3,291
  - Density: 1,230/km^{2} (3,190/sq mi)
- Time zone: UTC+01:00 (CET)
  - Summer (DST): UTC+02:00 (CEST)
- INSEE/Postal code: 57123 /57490
- ^{1} French Land Register data, which excludes lakes, ponds, glaciers > 1 km^{2} (0.386 sq mi or 247 acres) and river estuaries.

Carling (French pronunciation: [kaʁlɛ̃]; German: Karlingen) is a commune in the Moselle department in Grand Est in north-eastern France.

== Population ==
Historical population
Year	Pop.	±% p.a.
1968	2,783	—
1975	2,593	−1.01%
1982	3,422	+4.04%
1990	3,709	+1.01%
1999	3,736	+0.08%
2007	3,724	−0.04%
2012	3,508	−1.19%
2017	3,445	−0.36%
2023	3,291	−0.76%
Source: INSEE

== See also ==
- Communes of the Moselle department
