= Folschviller Seat =

Coal mine in France

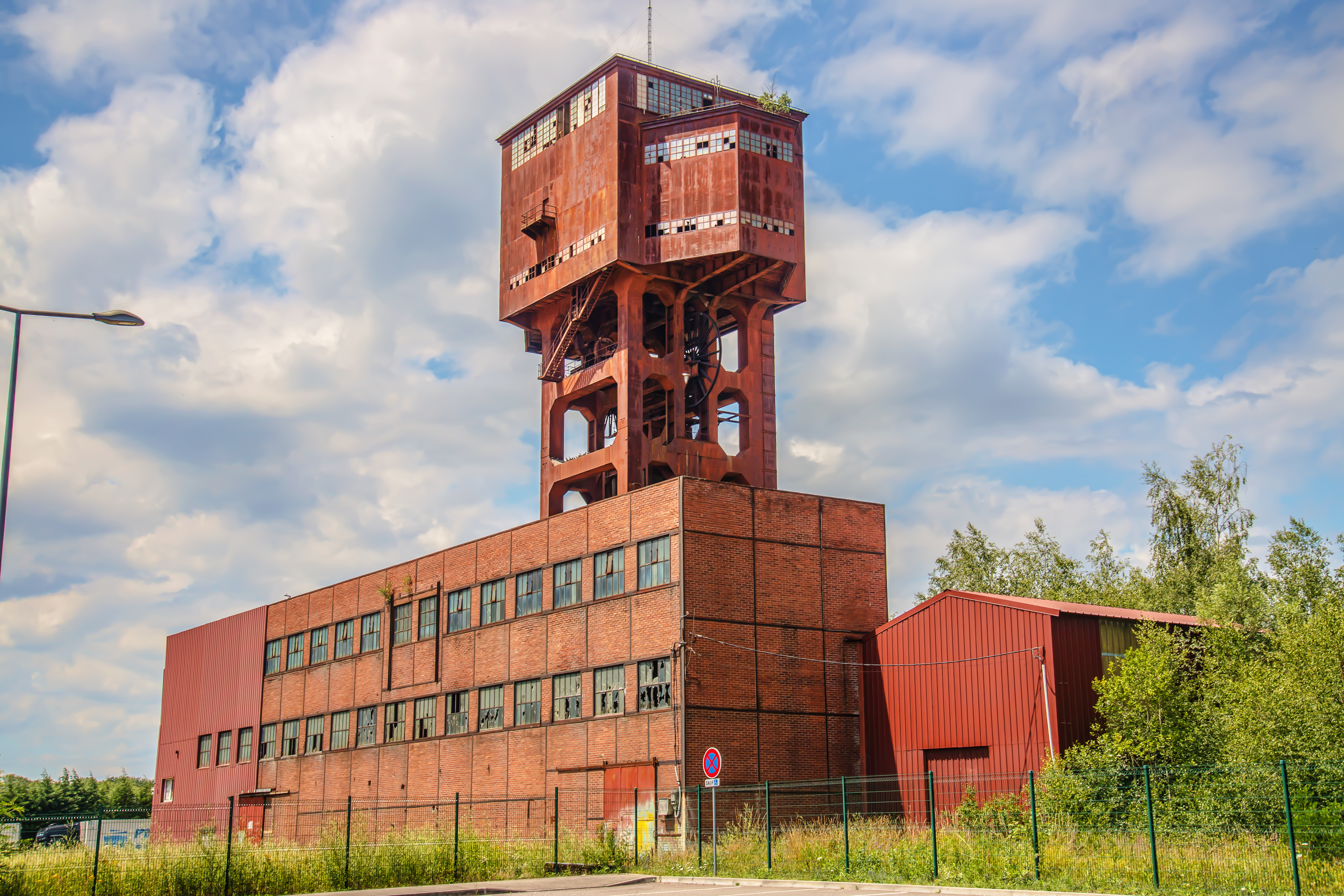
- Remnants of the coal mine in 2022.
- Interactive map of Folschviller Seat
- Location: Folschviller, Grand Est, France; 49.0841°N 6.6744°E
- Products: black coal
- Production: 900,000 tons (1960)
- Opened: 1949
- Closed: 1979
- Company: Compagnie des Mines de Saint-Avold; Charbonnages de France

The Folschviller Seat of the Coal Mines of Lorraine (French: Siège de Folschviller) is a liquidated coal mine in Folschviller, France.

The coal mine was opened in 1949 under the state-owned Coal Mines of Lorraine (French: Houillères du Bassin de Lorraine), producing a total of 20,041,979 tonnes of coal over its 30 years of operation until its ultimate closure on 2 March 1979.

== History ==
=== Prospecting and early German ventures ===
In the beginning of the 20th century, while the territory lay within Germany, several geological surveys were conducted southwest of Kleinrosseln to delineate the Saar-Lorraine Coal Basin. With the Sankt Avold region showing promise, the International Coal Mining Joint-Stock Company (German: Internationale Kohlenbergwerks AG) was founded in 1906. The company acquired 25 hectares of land near the historic centre of Folschweiler in 1908, and sunk two shafts by 1909, each 5 metres in diameter: Alexandre Dreux 1 and 2 (named after an administrator of the company). Failures in the shaft lining led to the flooding of the shafts. Subsequently, installations at the site were dismantled and abandoned in 1911. The outbreak of World War I in 1914 halted all work at the site.

=== Establishment efforts during the interwar period ===
With World War I coming to an end, the Treaty of Versailles signed in 1919 enabled the return of Alsace–Lorraine to France, although French troops had already been present in the region since late 1918. Interest in the site reignited in 1928, when the International Coal Mines Joint-Stock Company (French: Société Anonyme Internationale des Houillères) acquired the Fürst and Vieux Berfang estates in Folschviller. The following year, the company was restructured into the Saint-Avold Mining Company (French: Compagnie des Mines de Saint-Avold). In the early 1930s the company undertook a series of surveys in the area, before sinking two shafts by cementing in 1931: Shaft 1 and 2. Situated on the heights by the Fürst Château (which served as the company's headquarter) they benefited from a better geological yield. As a part of postwar reparations, the Aachen-based Karl Alexander company was charged with construction at the site. In 1933, a massive influx of water at a depth of 310 metres impeded construction, further compounded by the economic crisis in France at the time. Ultimately, by 1939 surface installations at the site were completed, including the headframe, workshops and the power plant.

=== Folschviller mine under nationalization ===
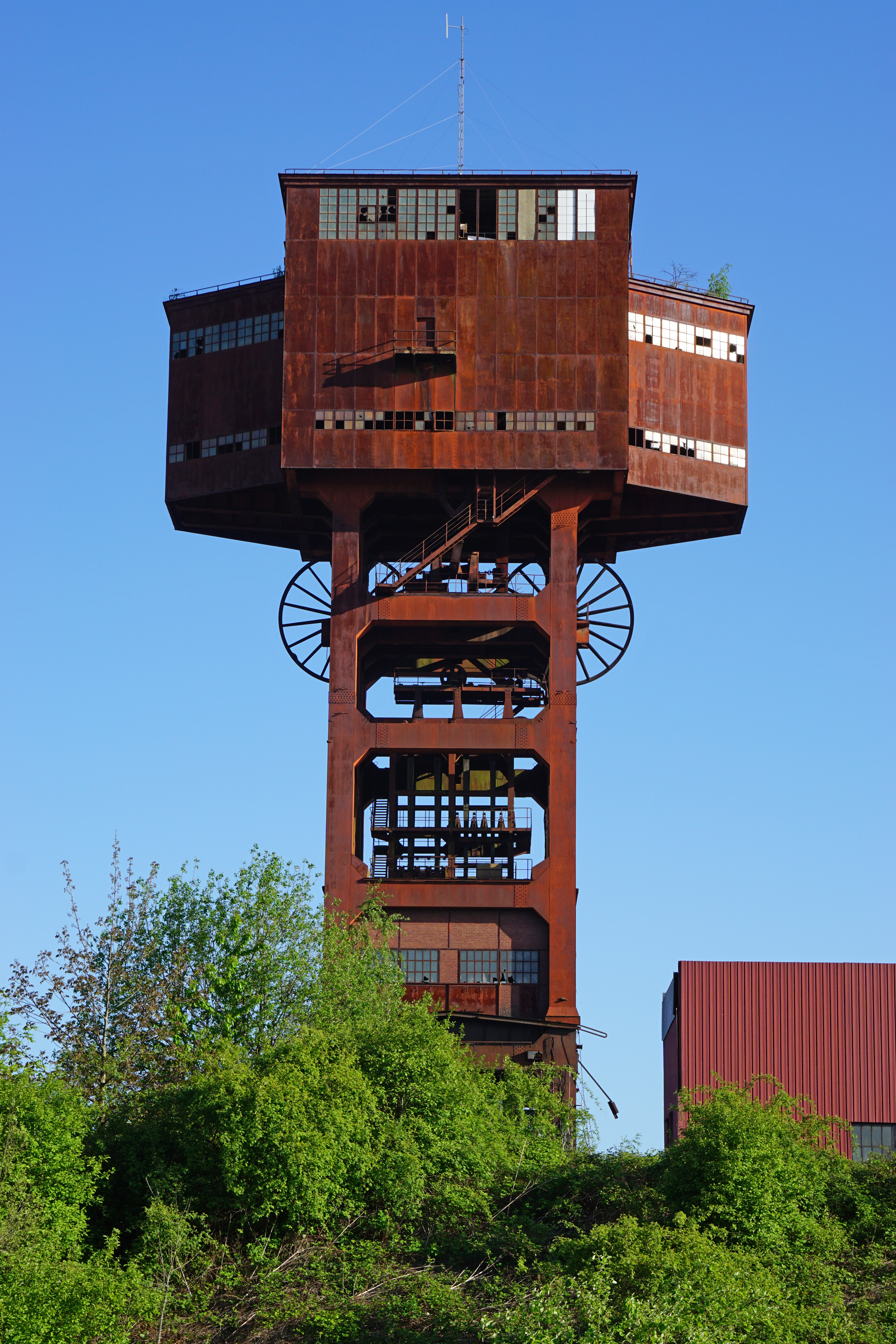
The headframe of Shaft 1.

In the aftermath of Second World War, the coal mining industry in France was nationalized, with the establishment of the state-owned company Charbonnages de France in 1946. This followed a general postwar European trend of government involvement in economic planning. Consequently, the Folschviller mine came under the apparatus of the Coal Mines of Lorraine (French: Houillères du Bassin de Lorraine) as the Folschviller Seat (French: Siège de Folschviller), under which shaft sinking was completed by 1948. That same year, the construction of the 58-metre steel headframe of Shaft 1 was completed, built by the Barbier, Bernard, and Turenne Company from Quiévrechain.

The coal mine finally began production in 1949, following the preparation of underground levels at 609 and 760 metres. Initial extraction was faced with difficulty, with significant methane emissions (up to 135 m³/t) hindering the mine's operation. In its first year, the mine produced 52,000 tonnes of coal, rising to 190,000 tonnes in the following year. On 25 January 1951, a methane fire broke out at the mine, halting production for 5 months. In response, the Nied River was diverted to flood its underground levels and extinguish the fire. Four years later, on 16 April 1955, a flood occurred at a depth of 690 metres, halting production for a month.

By 1960 production reached 900,000 tonnes; by 1968 production reached just short of a million tonnes, with an average miner's output of 4 tonnes of coal per shift. Despite this, coal extraction at the site became decreasingly profitable. The Yom Kippur War and oil crisis in 1973 temporarily restored domestic coal prices. On 2 March 1979, the Folschviller Seat ultimately terminated its activities, and the liquidation of the coal mine began. At the behest of locals, the headframe of Shaft 1 was spared during liquidation, sold by the Coal Mines of Lorraine to the commune of Folschviller in 1982 for a symbolic price of 30 francs.

== Production ==
Coal production at the Folschviller Seat
Year	Production (in tonnes)
1949	52,000
1950	190,000
1960	900,000
