= Roues libres =

2002 Franco–Ivorian crime drama film

- Directed by: Sidiki Bakaba
- Written by: Sidiki Bakaba; Ayala Bakaba
- Produced by: Ayala Bakaba; Berti Dichi
- Cinematography: Alain Levent
- Edited by: Vera Memmi
- Music by: Meiway
- Production companies: Arte France Cinéma; Afriki Projection; Centre National du Cinéma et de l'Image Animée
- Release date: 18 May 2002 (France)
- Running time: 89 min.
- Country: Ivory Coast
- Language: French

Roues libres (Germany: Nachtfahrt), is a 2002 Ivorian crime drama film directed by Sidiki Bakaba and co-produced by Ayala Bakaba and Berti Dichi. The film stars Adama Dahico, Placide Bayoro, Daouda Traoré and Michel Gohou in main roles.

It was filmed entirety in Abidjan, Côte D'Ivoire. The film received critical acclaim and won several awards at international film festivals including Best director at l’Association des Professionnels du cinéma de Côte d'Ivoire.

== Cast ==
- Adama Dahico as Fofana
- Placide Bayoro as Guélé
- Daouda Traoré as Patcheco
- Sidiki Bakaba as Commissaire Blazo
- Michel Gohou as Amara
- Alomo Ignace Konan as Sergent Kra
- Corinne Haccandy as Ema Amara
- Maho Monké as Pablo
