= Visages de femmes =

1985 Ivorian comedy drama film

- Directed by: Desiré Ecaré
- Written by: Desiré Ecaré
- Produced by: Desiré Ecaré
- Starring: Albertine N'Guessan; Sidiki Bakaba; Kouadou Brou; Eugénie Cissé-Roland; Véronique Mahilé
- Cinematography: Dominique Gentil; François Migeat
- Edited by: Nicolas Barachin; Madame Djé-Djé; Gisèle Miski
- Production company: Films de la Lagune
- Distributed by: Gérick Films; New Yorker Films
- Release date: 26 June 1985; (France)
- Running time: 95 minutes
- Countries: Côte d'Ivoire; France
- Languages: French; Aidoukrou

Visages de femmes (Faces of Women), is a 1985 Ivorian comedy drama film directed and produced by Desiré Ecaré for Films de la Lagune. The film stars Albertine N'Guessan in the lead role whereas Sidiki Bakaba, Kouadou Brou, Eugénie Cissé-Roland and Véronique Mahilé made supportive roles.

The film made its premier on 26 June 1985 in France. The film received mixed reviews from critics and screened in many film festivals. The film was screened for the 24th International Critics' Week (24e Semaine de la Critique). Later, the film won the International Federation of Film Critics (FIPRESCI) Prize at the 1985 Cannes Film Festival. In the same year, the film was also nominated for the Golden Charybdis Award at the Taormina International Film Festival.

== Plot ==
The film revolves around Mrs. Congas, who runs a fish-drying business in a coastal city and her struggle to survive with her two daughter amidst males of the city.

== Cast ==
- Albertine N'Guessan as Mrs. Congas
- Sidiki Bakaba as Koiassi
- Kouadou Brou as Brou
- Eugénie Cissé-Roland as Fish Seller
- Véronique Mahilé
- Carmen Levry
- Anny Brigitte
- Alexis Leache
- Victor Couzyn
- Fatou Fall
- Traore Siriki
- Désiré Bamba
