= Léonard Groguhet =

Ivorian actor and humorist (1939–2021)

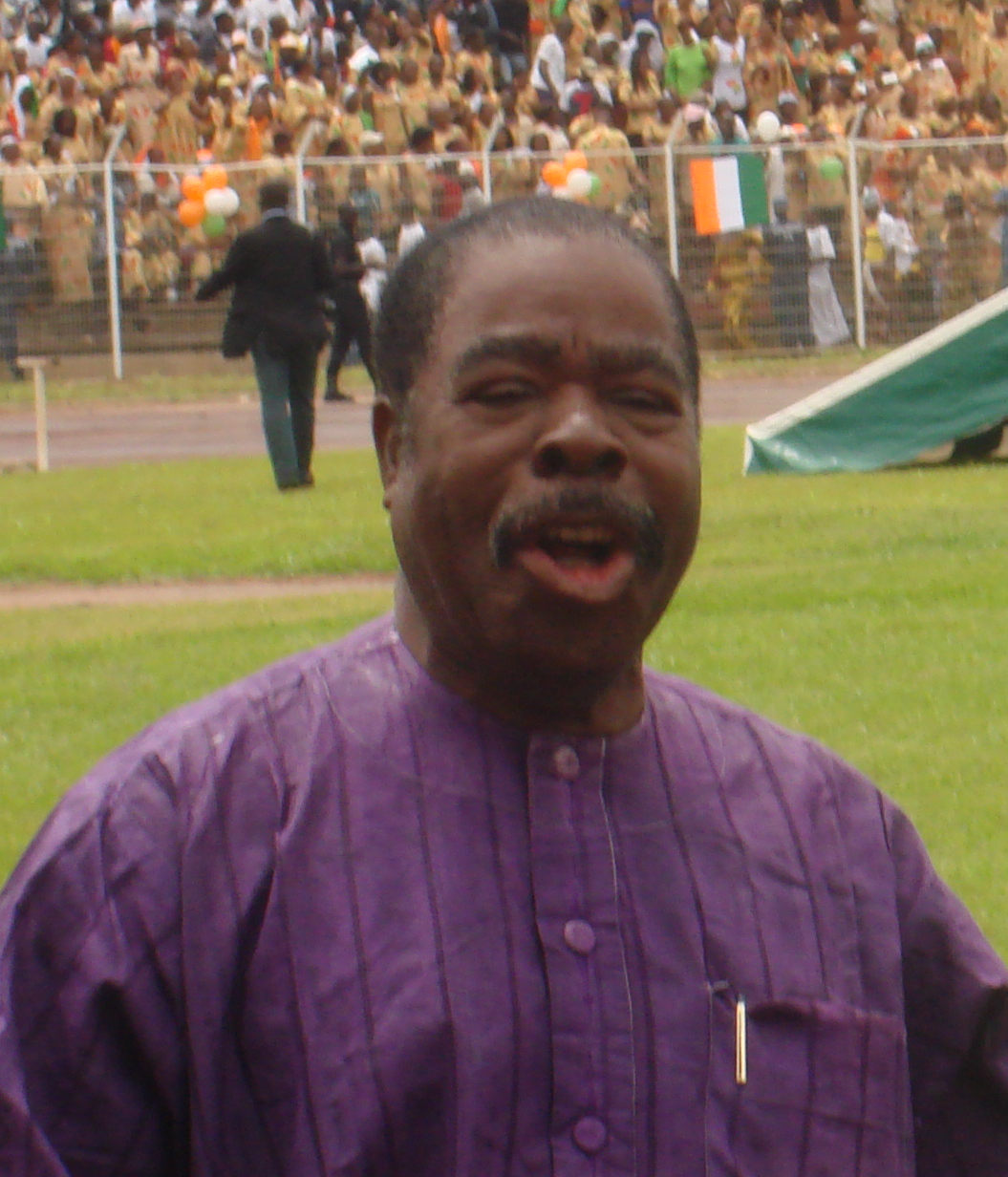
- Groguhet in 2007
- Born: 1939; Daloa, French West Africa, France
- Died: 4 September 2021 (aged 81–82)
- Education: Université Internationale du Théâtre
- Occupation: Actor
- Television: Ma Famille

Léonard Groguhet (1939 – 4 September 2021) was an Ivorian actor and humorist.

== Biography ==
Born in 1939 in Daloa, Léonard was the son of Gbaily Groguhet. He worked as an administrative clerk before completing his military service from 1954 to 1958. In 1959, he moved to Saint-Louis and began studying at the Centre National d'Art Dramatique, where he performed in plays such as Le Médecin malgré lui. In 1961, he joined the École nationale supérieure des arts et techniques du théâtre in Paris, where he studied for three years. In 1965, he enrolled at the Institut d'Études Théâtrales de la Sorbonne, where he studied under Jacques Scherer. He finished his studies at the Université Internationale du Théâtre from 1966 to 1968.

Upon his return to Côte d'Ivoire (Ivory Coast), Groguhet became a professor of theatre at the Institut national supérieur des arts et de l'action culturelle. In 1969, he began working for Radiodiffusion Television Ivoirienne and directed programs such as Le Stop dans le vent, Télé-week-end, and Comment ça va ?. In 2007, an Ivorian street was named in his honor, linking Boulevard Latrille to the Lycée Technique in Abidjan. He and Alpha Blondy were two of the few Ivorian artists to be honored this way.

Léonard Groguhet died on 4 September 2021.

== Filmography ==
- Mamie Watta (1998)
- Un mariage pas comme les autres (2000)
- Ma Famille (2002–2007)
- Bienvenue au Gondwana (2016)

== Theatre ==
- Pantagleize (Théâtre Gramont, 1965)
- La Tribu (Nouveau Théâtre Libre, 1967)
