= Valmont, Moselle =

Valmont
- Commune
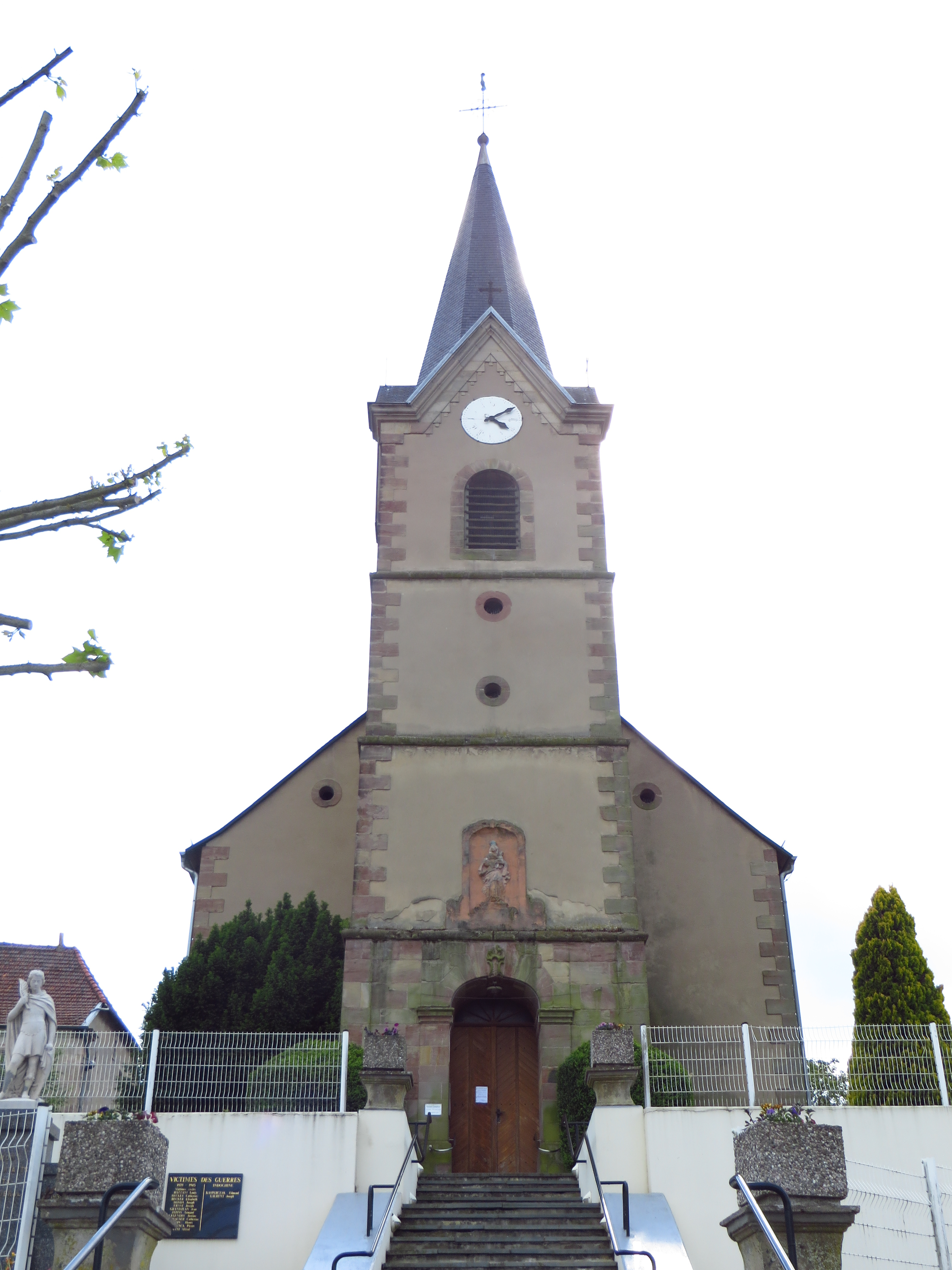
- The church in Valmont

- Coat of arms
- Location of Valmont
- Location within France Location within Grand Est
- Coordinates: 49°05′09″N 6°41′59″E
- Country: France
- Region: Grand Est
- Department: Moselle
- Arrondissement: Forbach-Boulay-Moselle
- Canton: Saint-Avold
- Intercommunality: CA Saint-Avold Synergie

Government
  - Mayor (2020–2026): Salvatore Coscarella
- Area^{1}: 9.24 km^{2} (3.57 sq mi)
- Elevation: 321 m (1,053 ft)
- Highest elevation: 387 m (1,270 ft)
- Lowest elevation: 246 m (807 ft)
- Population (2023): 3,041
  - Density: 329/km^{2} (852/sq mi)
- Time zone: UTC+01:00 (CET)
  - Summer (DST): UTC+02:00 (CEST)
- INSEE/Postal code: 57690 /57730
- ^{1} French Land Register data, which excludes lakes, ponds, glaciers > 1 km^{2} (0.386 sq mi or 247 acres) and river estuaries.

Valmont (French pronunciation: [valmɔ̃]; German: Walmen) is a commune in the Moselle department in Grand Est in north-eastern France.

== Population ==
Historical population
Year	Pop.	±% p.a.
1968	1,937	—
1975	1,713	−1.74%
1982	1,927	+1.70%
1990	2,012	+0.54%
1999	1,986	−0.14%
2007	1,955	−0.20%
2012	1,983	+0.28%
2017	2,132	+1.46%
2023	3,041	+6.10%
Source: INSEE

== See also ==
- Communes of the Moselle department
