= Timité Bassori =

Ivorian filmmaker, actor and writer

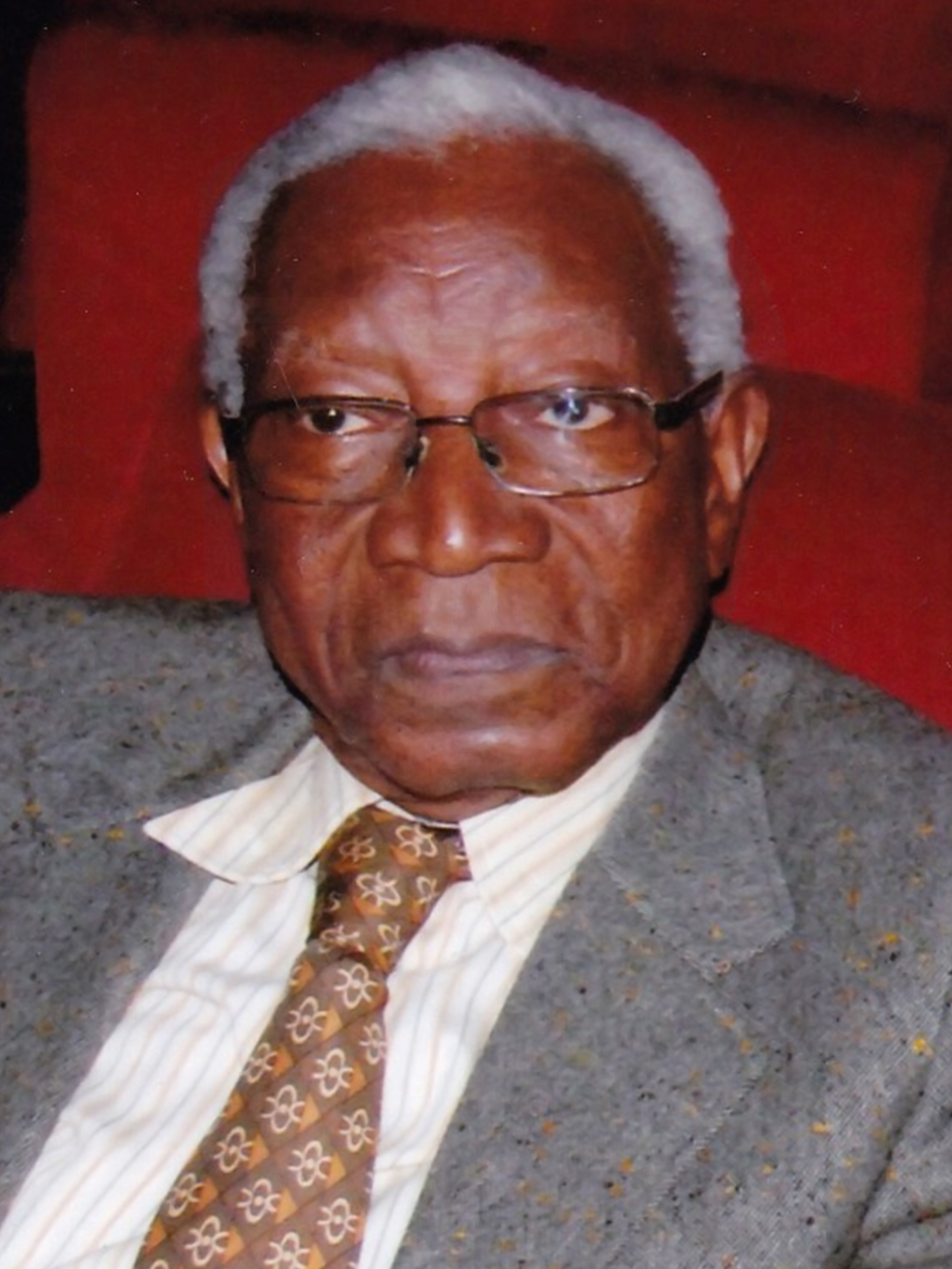
- Bassori in 2020
- Born: 30 December 1933 (age 92); Aboisso, Ivory Coast, French West Africa
- Education: College Technique d'Abidjan; Cours Simon; Institut des hautes études cinématographiques
- Occupations: Filmmaker, actor, writer
- Notable work: The Woman with the Knife

Timité Bassori (born 30 December 1933) is an Ivorian filmmaker, actor, and writer. His only feature-length film, The Woman with the Knife (1969), is considered a classic of African cinema.

== Early life and education ==
Of Mandé-Dioula origin, Timité Bassori was born on 30 December 1933, in Aboisso in the extreme south-east of Côte d'Ivoire.

After attending elementary school there in 1949, he entered the Technical College of Abidjan. He completed his studies in 1952 and worked in various commercial establishments.

Wanting to do theatre, he left for Paris, France; first at Cours Simon from 1956 to 1957 then at the Center d'Art Dramatique on rue Blanche from 1957 to 1958.

== Career ==
Bassori was president of the Compagnie d'Art Dramatique des Griots, which he founded in 1957 with student friends.

His only feature-length film, The Woman with the Knife (1969), is considered a classic of African cinema. It was restored as part of the African Film Heritage Project, an initiative to preserve 50 African films through the collaboration of the groups FEPACI, UNESCO, Cineteca di Bologna, and Martin Scorsese's The Film Foundation. The film was shown along with 4 other restored films at the 2019 film festival FESPACO.

The film Bouka (Roger Gnoan M'Bala, 1988) is based upon his short story "Jeux dangereux" (1974).

== Filmography ==
=== As director ===
- The Foresters (documentary; 1963)
- Abidjan-Niger (documentary; 1963)
- Amédée Pierre (documentary; 1963)
- On the Dune of Solitude (1964)
- The Sixth Furrow (1966)
- Bush Fires (1967)
- The Woman with the Knife (1969)
- Abidjan, the Lagoon Pearl (1971)
- Bondoukou, Year 11 (1971)
- Odienné, Year 12 (1972)
- Kossou 1 (1972)
- Kossou 2 (1974)
- The Akati Fellows (1974)

=== As producer ===
- The Woman with the Knife (1969)
- Black and White in Color (1976)
- Weeds (1978)

=== As assistant director ===
- Man from Cocody (1965)

== Literature ==
- 1974: Les Bannis du village
- 1983: Grelots d'or
- 1986: Les eaux claires de ma source
