= Altviller =

- Commune
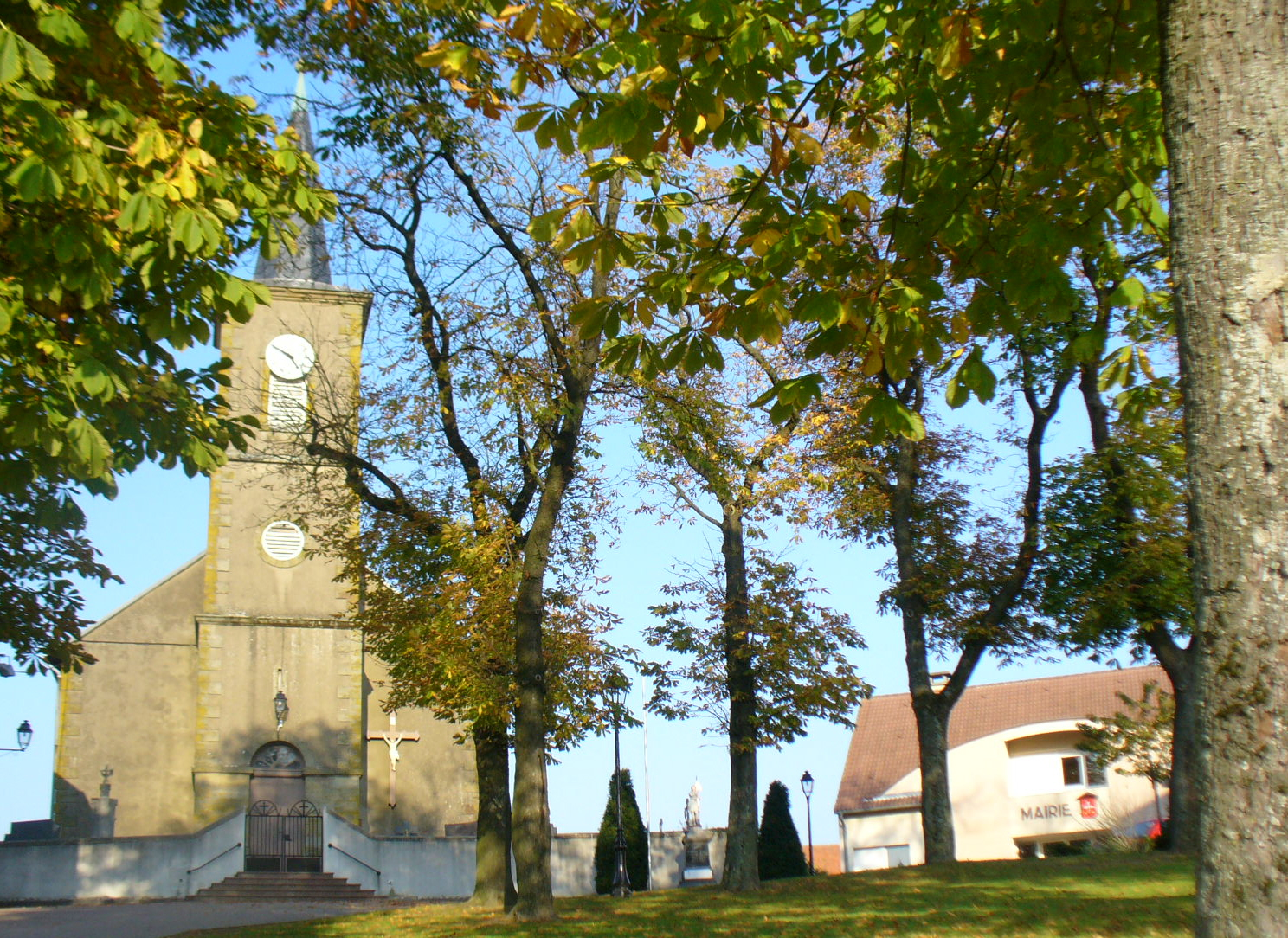
- The town hall square in Altviller

- Coat of arms
- Location of Altviller
- Location within France Location within Grand Est
- Coordinates: 49°04′24″N 6°44′00″E
- Country: France
- Region: Grand Est
- Department: Moselle
- Arrondissement: Forbach-Boulay-Moselle
- Canton: Saint-Avold
- Intercommunality: CA Saint-Avold Synergie

Government
  - Mayor (2020–2026): Jean-Jacques Ballèvre
- Area^{1}: 4.85 km^{2} (1.87 sq mi)
- Elevation: 305 m (1,001 ft)
- Highest elevation: 296 m (971 ft)
- Lowest elevation: 251 m (823 ft)
- Population (2023): 524
  - Density: 108/km^{2} (280/sq mi)
- Time zone: UTC+01:00 (CET)
  - Summer (DST): UTC+02:00 (CEST)
- INSEE/Postal code: 57015 /57730
- ^{1} French Land Register data, which excludes lakes, ponds, glaciers > 1 km^{2} (0.386 sq mi or 247 acres) and river estuaries.

Altviller (French pronunciation: [altvilɛʁ]; German: Altweiler) is a commune in the Moselle department in Grand Est in northeastern France.

== Population ==
Historical population
Year	Pop.	±% p.a.
1968	346	—
1975	311	−1.51%
1982	464	+5.88%
1990	506	+1.09%
1999	534	+0.60%
2007	571	+0.84%
2012	564	−0.25%
2017	586	+0.77%
2023	524	−1.85%
Source: INSEE

== See also ==
- Communes of the Moselle department
