= Folschviller =

- Commune
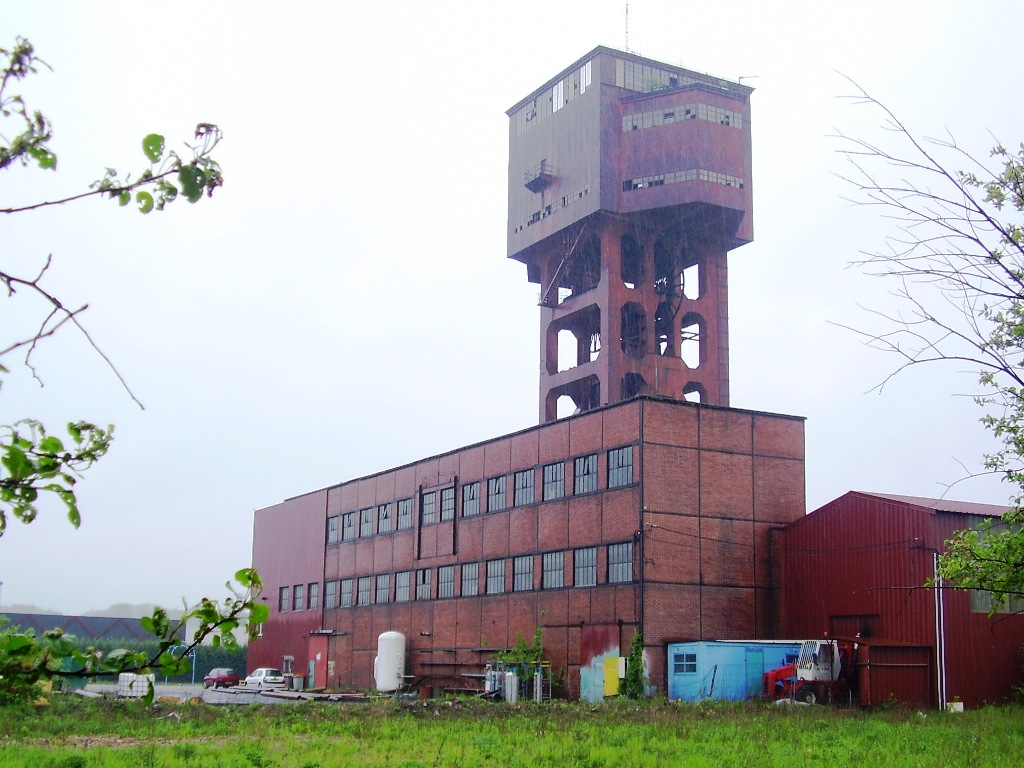
- A pithead of the former mine in Folschviller

- Coat of arms
- Location of Folschviller
- Location within France Location within Grand Est
- Coordinates: 49°04′13″N 6°41′09″E
- Country: France
- Region: Grand Est
- Department: Moselle
- Arrondissement: Forbach-Boulay-Moselle
- Canton: Saint-Avold
- Intercommunality: CA Saint-Avold Synergie

Government
  - Mayor (2020–2026): Didier Zimny
- Area^{1}: 9.46 km^{2} (3.65 sq mi)
- Elevation: 276 m (906 ft)
- Highest elevation: 387 m (1,270 ft)
- Lowest elevation: 246 m (807 ft)
- Population (2023): 3,916
  - Density: 414/km^{2} (1,070/sq mi)
- Time zone: UTC+01:00 (CET)
  - Summer (DST): UTC+02:00 (CEST)
- INSEE/Postal code: 57224 /57730
- ^{1} French Land Register data, which excludes lakes, ponds, glaciers > 1 km^{2} (0.386 sq mi or 247 acres) and river estuaries.

Folschviller (French pronunciation: [fɔlʃvilɛʁ]; German: Folschweiler) is a commune in the Moselle department in Grand Est in north-eastern France.

In March 2025 it was announced that a massive reserve of hydrogen had been discovered under Folschviller, estimated to be 46 million tons, worth 92 billion dollars. It is the largest discovery of naturally occurring hydrogen to date. Localities of the commune: Aling, Berfang Neuf, Vieux Berfang.

== Population ==
Historical population
Year	Pop.	±% p.a.
1968	4,825	—
1975	4,712	−0.34%
1982	4,957	+0.73%
1990	4,581	−0.98%
1999	4,635	+0.13%
2007	4,308	−0.91%
2012	4,168	−0.66%
2017	3,993	−0.85%
2023	3,916	−0.32%
Source: INSEE

== See also ==
- Communes of the Moselle department
