= The Woman with the Knife =

1969 film by Timité Bassori

- Poster
- Directed by: Timité Bassori
- Written by: Timité Bassori
- Starring: Timité Bassori; Mary Vieyra; Danielle Alloh
- Release date: 1969
- Running time: 80 minutes
- Country: Ivory Coast
- Language: French

The Woman with the Knife (Original title: La femme au couteau) is a 1969 Ivorian French-language drama / thriller film directed by Timité Bassori. It is the director's only feature-length film, and one of the first feature-length films from Ivory Coast. It is considered a classic of African cinema, and was restored as part of the African Film Heritage Project, an initiative to preserve 50 African films through the collaboration of the groups FEPACI, UNESCO, Cineteca di Bologna, and Martin Scorsese's The Film Foundation.

== Plot ==
The film is about a young intellectual from the Ivory Coast who returns home to Abidjan. He strives to reconcile European and African schools of thought, as well as conflicts between modernity and tradition, when he begins seeing strange visions of a woman with a knife.

== Reception ==
The movie was an official selection at the 1969 Locarno Film Festival, and at the 2nd FESPACO in 1970. The film was a 2019 selection at Il Cinema Ritrovato festival in Bologna, Italy. Following its restoration, the film was screened at the 2019 edition of FESPACO.

According to Françoise Pfaff, writing in Twenty-Five Black African Filmmakers, “La Femme au Couteau stands unquestionably as Timité Bassori’s most accomplished work. It focuses on the story of a young Westernized Ivorian who seeks appeasement for his existential anguish and hallucinatory sexual fears through traditional African healing and modern Western psychoanalysis. According to Bassori, the film is ‘a personal experience and the result of multifarious observations of life.'”

== Cast ==
- Timité Bassori as The Man
- Mary Vieyra as The Woman with the Knife (as Marie Vieyra)
- Danielle Alloh as The Girlfriend
- Tim Sory
- Emmanuel Diaman
- Bertin Kouakou

== See also ==
- African cinema
