= Diesen =

- Commune
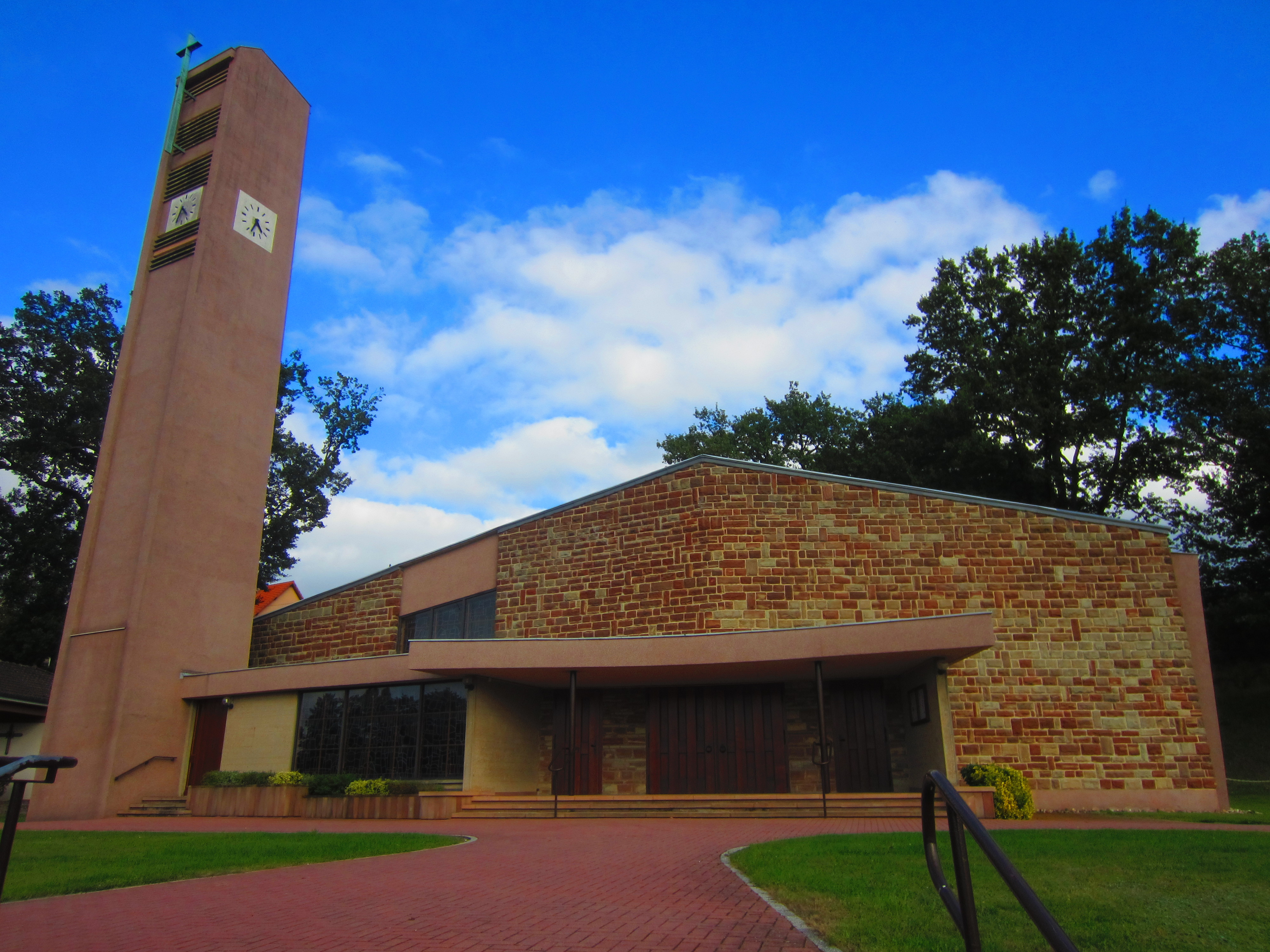
- The Church of Diesen

- Coat of arms
- Location of Diesen
- Location within France Location within Grand Est
- Coordinates: 49°10′43″N 6°40′44″E
- Country: France
- Region: Grand Est
- Department: Moselle
- Arrondissement: Forbach-Boulay-Moselle
- Canton: Saint-Avold
- Intercommunality: CA Saint-Avold Synergie

Government
  - Mayor (2020–2026): Gabriel Walkowiak
- Area^{1}: 5.47 km^{2} (2.11 sq mi)
- Highest elevation: 270 m (890 ft)
- Lowest elevation: 213 m (699 ft)
- Population (2023): 1,015
  - Density: 186/km^{2} (481/sq mi)
- Time zone: UTC+01:00 (CET)
  - Summer (DST): UTC+02:00 (CEST)
- INSEE/Postal code: 57765 /57890
- ^{1} French Land Register data, which excludes lakes, ponds, glaciers > 1 km^{2} (0.386 sq mi or 247 acres) and river estuaries.

Diesen (French pronunciation: [dizən]; German: Diesen) is a commune in the Moselle department in Grand Est in north-eastern France.

== See also ==
- Communes of the Moselle department
