= Grotowski =

Grotowski (Polish pronunciation: [ɡrɔˈtɔf.ski]; feminine: Grotowska; plural: Grotowscy) is a Polish-language surname.

== People ==
- Alfons Grotowski (1833–1922), Polish sanitary engineer
- Henryk Grotowski (1949–2019), Polish field hockey player
- Jerzy Grotowski (1933–1999), Polish theatre director and dramatic theorist
- Rafał Grotowski (born 1973), Polish field hockey player
- Steve Grotowski (born 1982), British beach volleyball player

== See also ==
- Grotowski Institute in Wrocław
