= Michel Bohiri =

Ivorian actor

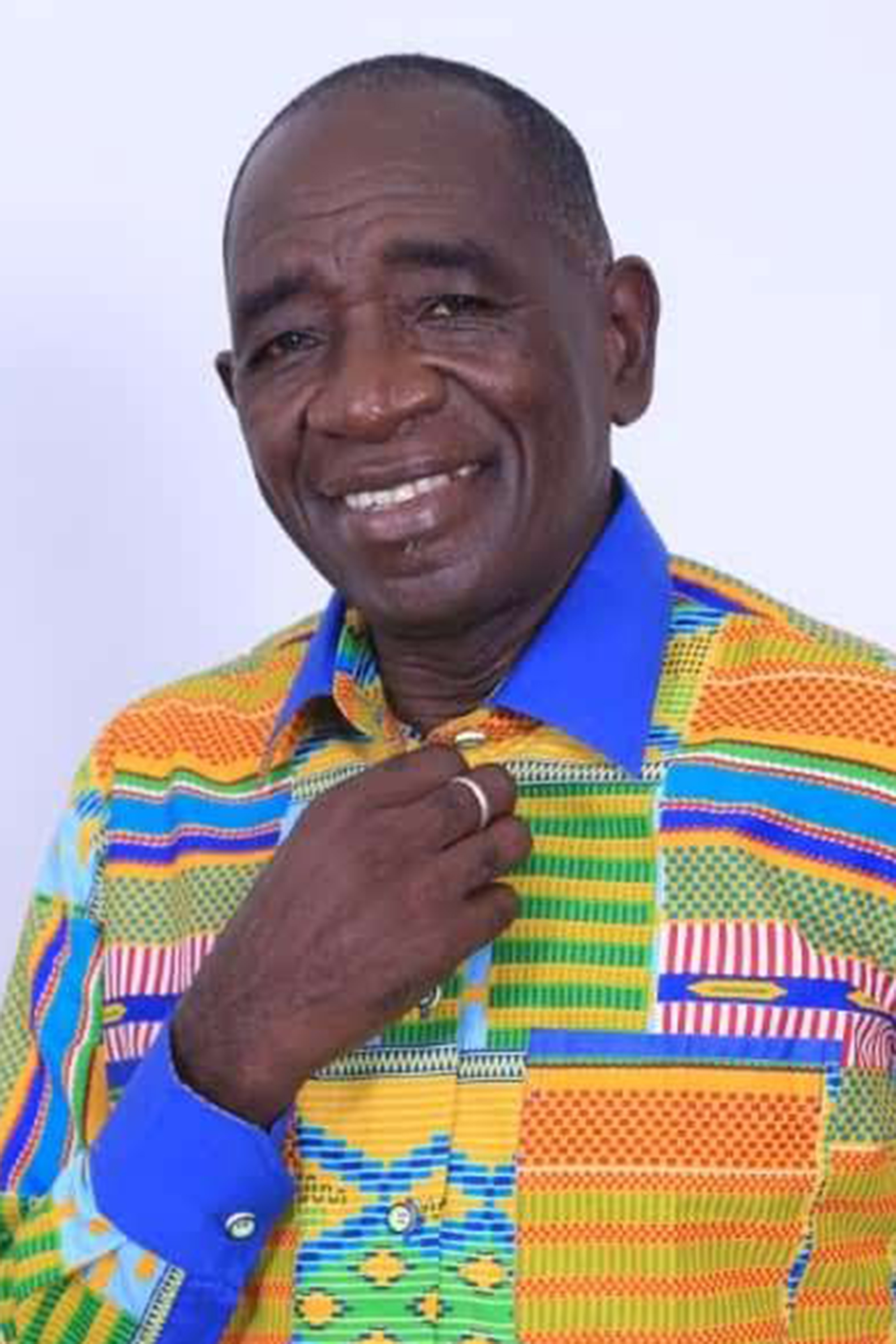
- Portrait of Michel Bohiri
- Occupation: Actor
- Notable work: Ma Famille

Michel Bohiri is an Ivorian actor. He was one of the main actors in the long-running television series Ma Famille (My Family). He became known throughout Africa for his work on the series. He left the show in 2007 to work with 225 Studios.

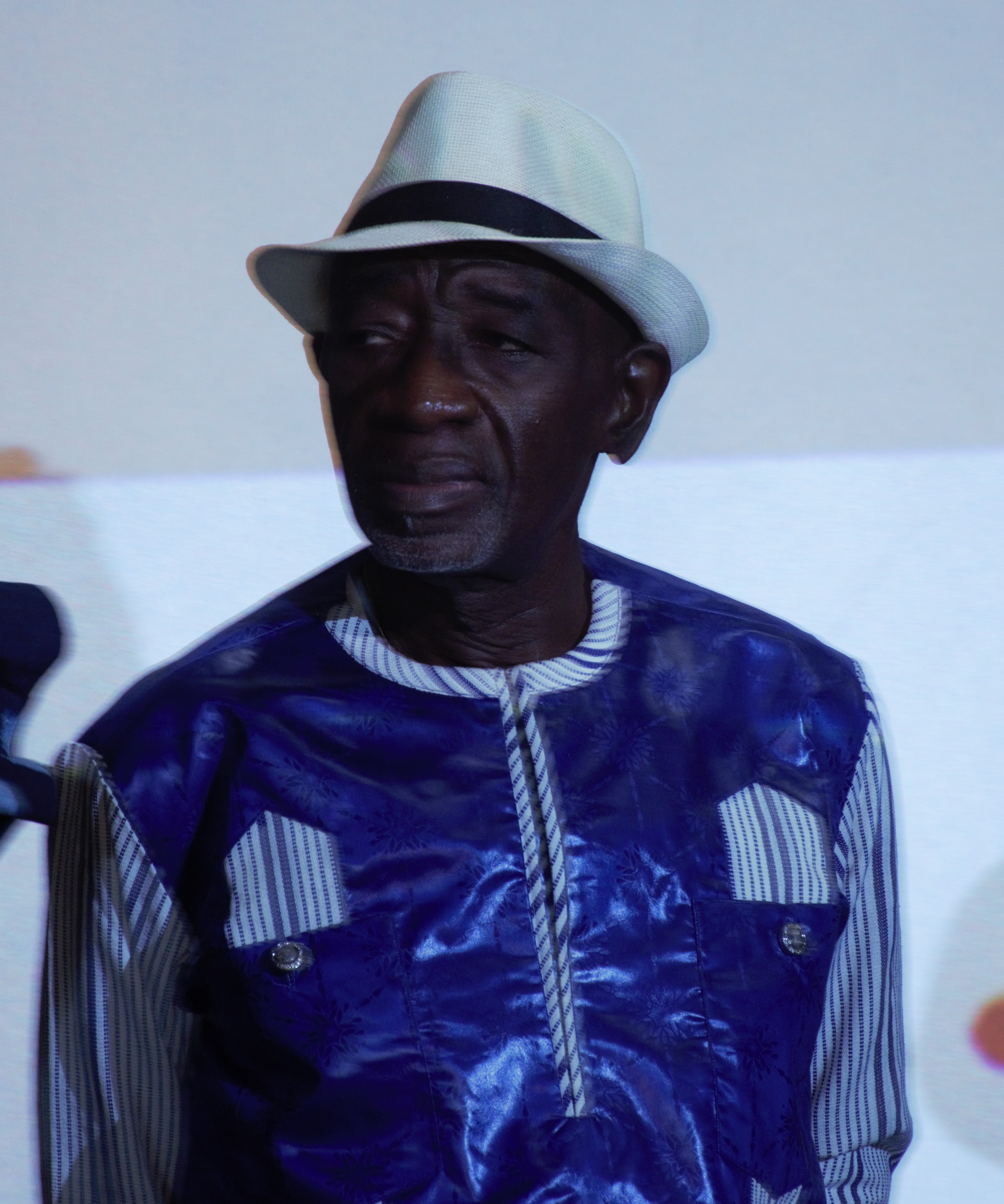
Michel Bohiri au FIFF 2024 de Cotonou au Bénin

== Filmography ==
- Guests surprised (2008)
- Article 15 Bis
- Ma famille
- Les Oiseaux du ciel (2006)
- Danger Permanent
- Le Choix de Marianne
- Marco et Clara
- Mon père a pris ma femme
- Pardon ! je t'aime
- Amour & Trahison
- Une famille sans scrupules
- L'Escroc
- Les Dragueurs
