= Ma Famille =

Ivorian television series

- Genre: Comedy drama
- Created by: Akissi Delta
- Country of origin: Côte d'Ivoire
- Original language: French
- No. of seasons: 5
- No. of episodes: 600

Production
- Running time: approx. 1 hour
- Production company: LAD Production

Original release
- Network: La Première
- Release: 2002 – 2007

Ma famille (French: My Family) is an Ivorian television series. The series "became one of the greatest success stories in the history of Ivorian television production, reaching most Francophone African countries."

== Cast ==
- Amélie Wabehi
- Akissi Delta
- Clémentine Papouet
- Michel Gohou
- Nastou Traoré
- Oupoh Dahier
- Josiane Yapo
- Méaka Hortense
- Patricia Ballet (Patty)
- Bassande Innocent
- Decothey
- Kramo Kouadio Paul
- Amoin Koffi
- Gueï Thérèse (Gbazé)
- Marie-Laure (Rogine Zouzou)
- Maï La Bombe
- Angéline Nadié
- Thérèse Taba
- Kouamé Eleonore
- Digbeu Cravatte
- Ange Keffa
- Michel Bohiri
- Marie-Louise Asseu
- Mican Koné
- Dohoun Kevin
