= Adanggaman =

- Directed by: Roger Gnoan M'Bala
- Written by: Jean-Marie Adiaffi, Bertin Akaffou
- Produced by: Tiziana Soudani
- Cinematography: Mohammed Soudani
- Edited by: Monica Goux
- Music by: Lokua Kanza
- Distributed by: New Yorker Films (United States)
- Release dates: August 31, 2000 (Venice); September 21, 2001 (Italy)
- Countries: Ivory Coast; Burkina Faso; Switzerland; Italy; France
- Languages: Bambara, Baoulé, French

Adanggaman is a 2000 historical drama film directed by Roger Gnoan M'Bala. It was an international co-production between the Ivory Coast, Burkina Faso, Switzerland, Italy and France. The film premiered at the 57th Venice International Film Festival on 31 August 2000.

== Plot ==
At Adanggaman's court, Ossei makes friends with a healer/seer, who was captured as a boy from his village/people by Adanggaman's empire in the 17th century. He heals some wounds that Ossei gained when travelling to Adanggaman, and reveals through his fortune-telling abilities that the future of all in the empire would be bleak for a long time, subject to slavery and oppression. The healer sees his daughter at the court (Naka), who doesn't acknowledge him initially, but recalls her childhood with him guiding her as his only daughter. The seer protests to King Adanngaman, who in turn for his perceived insolence, orders him and Ossei to be sold as slaves. The healer dies whilst in captivity, overcome by disbelief, grief and abandonment.

In the end, Ossei leaves Naka, after the two escape, become close friends, and form a household. He goes travelling, to forge a new life, but is captured by soldiers of Adangamaan's court and thus prepped for sale into slavery. He is sold to Europeans, who transport him to the Americas via the Middle Passage, and is renamed John Stanford by a wealthy plantation owner. He dies at age 70, having five children with a slave woman. King Adangaaman is captured by his aides whilst drunk from rum, and in turn sold to Europeans. He becomes a slave in St. Louis, and is a cook to Europeans there, being given the name Walter Brown. He dies in 1698 from tuberculosis.

== Cast ==
- Rasmane Ouedraogo ... Adanggaman
- Albertine N'Guessan ... Mo Akassi
- Ziable Honoré Goore Bi ... Ossei
- Bintou Bakayoko ... Ehua
- Nicole Suzis Menyeng ... Adjo
- Mireille Andrée Boti ... Mawa
- Tie Dijian Patrick ... Kanga
- Lou Nadège Blagone ... Safo Aboua
- Didier Grandidier ... Bangalajan
- Mylène-Perside Boti Kouame ... Naka
- Étienne Goheti Bi Gore ... Poro
- Zie Soro ... Sory
- Sie Lou Chantal ... Amazon
- Sokpo Germaine ... Amazon
- Bi Cécile ... Amazon

== Awards ==
In 2000, Andanggaman won the Best Actor and Special Jury Award at the Amiens International Film Festival. The following year it won the Special Jury Award at the Marrakech International Film Festival and the awards for Best Actress and Best Cinematography at the Ouagadougou Panafrican Film and Television Festival.

== Bibliography ==
- Africans Making Slaves of Africans, Elvis Mitchell, The New York Times, 2001 July 11
- Adanggaman (2000), Allmovie, Todd Kristel, Access date: 2002 May 6
- Olivier Barlet, “A Reflection on Power: Interview of Olivier Barlet with Roger Gnoan M’Bala.” Africiné, 1 Sept. 1999
