= Ablakon =

1984 film

- Directed by: Roger Gnoan M'Bala
- Written by: Roger Gnoan M'Bala
- Produced by: Films du Koundoun
- Starring: Kodjo Eboucle; Issa Sanogo; Mathieu Attawa; Joel Okou; Bitty Moro; Adjei Zoubly
- Cinematography: Paul Kodjo
- Edited by: Ahoussy Djangoye
- Music by: Les Mystics
- Distributed by: Marfilmes
- Release date: 1984
- Running time: 81 minutes
- Country: Ivory Coast
- Language: French

Ablakon is a 1984 drama film that was directed by Roger Gnoan M'Bala.

== Festivals ==
- Milan Film Festival (1997)
- Venice Film Festival (1985)

== Awards ==
- Prize for Best Actor FESPACO - Panafrican Film and Television Festival of Ouagadougou, Burkina Faso (1985)

== See also ==
- Roger Gnoan M'Bala
