= Porcelette =

- Commune
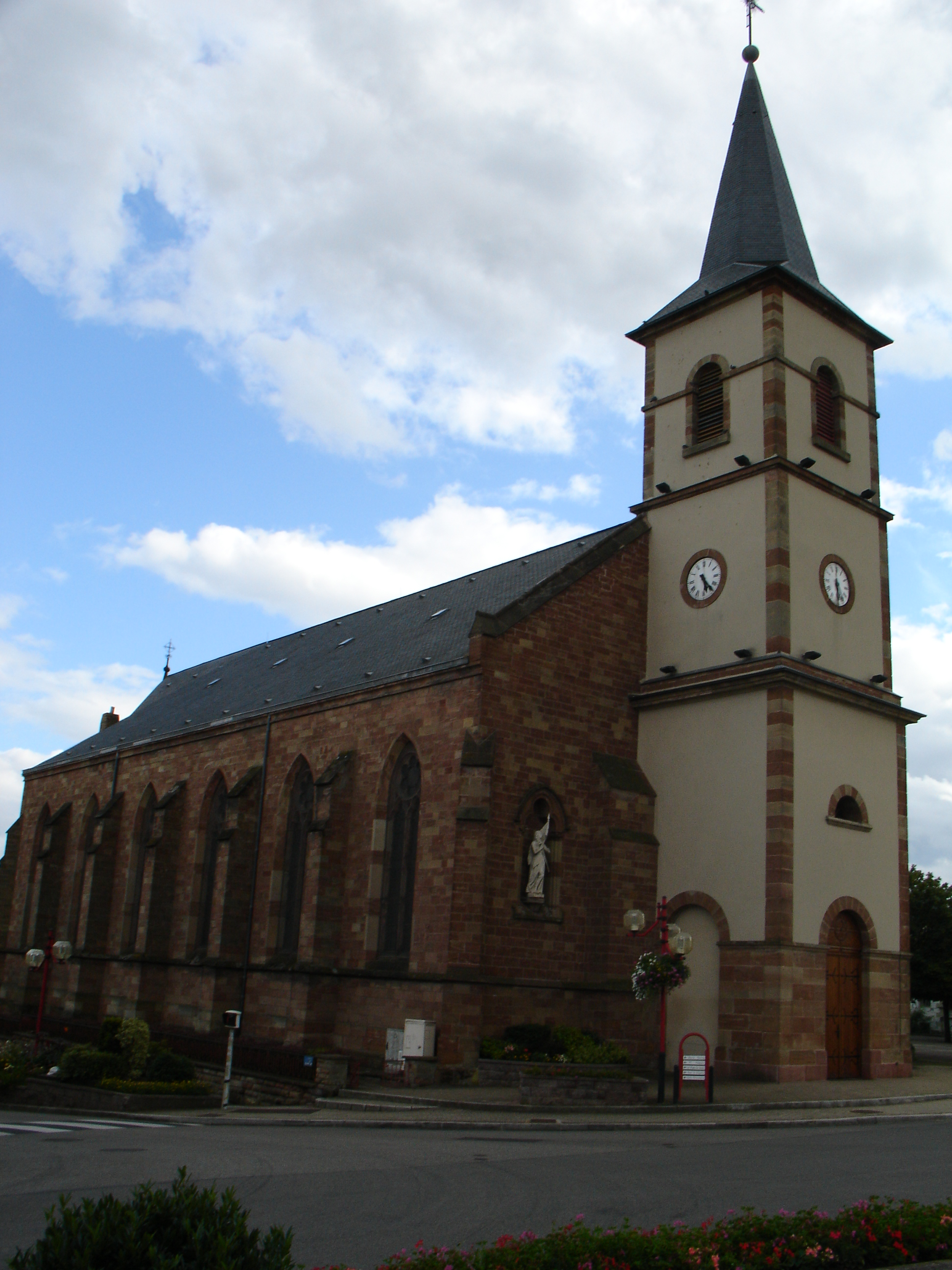
- Façade of Sainte-Croix church

- Coat of arms
- Location of Porcelette
- Location within France Location within Grand Est
- Coordinates: 49°09′26″N 6°39′23″E
- Country: France
- Region: Grand Est
- Department: Moselle
- Arrondissement: Forbach-Boulay-Moselle
- Canton: Saint-Avold
- Intercommunality: CA Saint-Avold Synergie

Government
  - Mayor (2020–2026): Alain Risch
- Area^{1}: 13.44 km^{2} (5.19 sq mi)
- Elevation: 250 m (820 ft)
- Highest elevation: 342 m (1,122 ft)
- Lowest elevation: 213 m (699 ft)
- Population (2023): 2,397
  - Density: 178.3/km^{2} (461.9/sq mi)
- Time zone: UTC+01:00 (CET)
  - Summer (DST): UTC+02:00 (CEST)
- INSEE/Postal code: 57550 /57890
- ^{1} French Land Register data, which excludes lakes, ponds, glaciers > 1 km^{2} (0.386 sq mi or 247 acres) and river estuaries.

Porcelette (French pronunciation: [pɔʁsəlɛt]; German: Porzelet) is a commune in the Moselle department in Grand Est in north-eastern France.

== Population ==
Historical population
Year	Pop.	±% p.a.
1968	1,659	—
1975	1,918	+2.09%
1982	2,097	+1.28%
1990	2,322	+1.28%
1999	2,458	+0.63%
2007	2,467	+0.05%
2012	2,542	+0.60%
2017	2,485	−0.45%
2023	2,397	−0.60%
Source: INSEE

== See also ==
- Communes of the Moselle department
