= Desiré Ecaré =

Ivorian film director (1939–2009)

Désiré Écaré
- Born: April 15, 1939; Treichville
- Died: February 16, 2009 (aged 69); Abidjan
- Citizenship: Ivorian
- Occupation: Film director
- Known for: Faces of Women

Désiré Écaré (April 15, 1939 in Treichville, Côte d'Ivoire – February 16, 2009 in Abidjan, Côte d'Ivoire) was an Ivorian film director. His directorial debut was the film Concerto pour un exil (Concerto for an Exile) in 1968, followed by À nous deux, France (1970). He directed the seminal film Faces of Women in 1985, which went on to win the FIPRESCI Prize at Cannes Film Festival.

== See also ==
- Faces of Women
- Cannes Film Festival
