= Roger Gnoan M'Bala =

Ivorian film director (1943–2023)

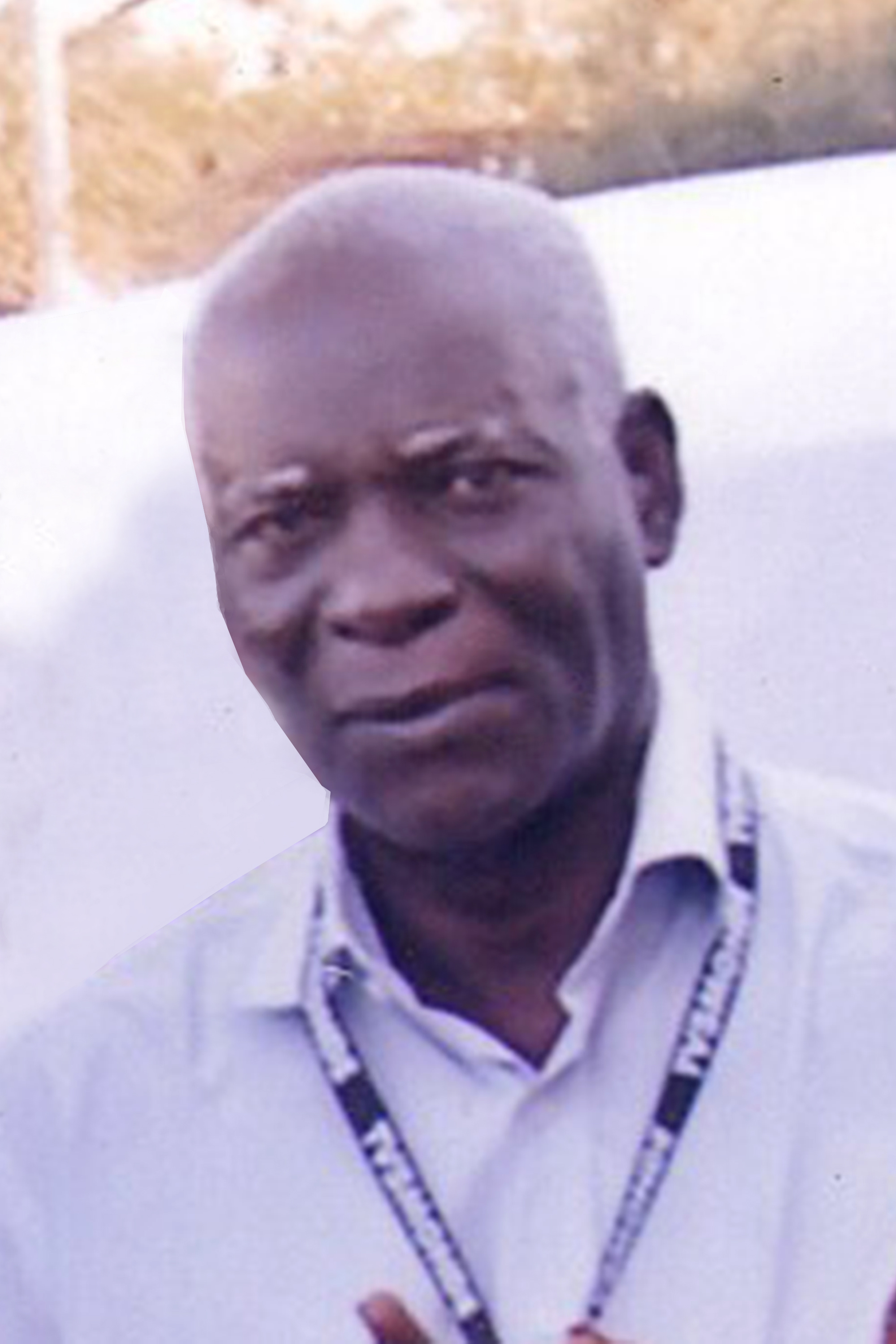
- Born: 1943; Grand-Bassam, French West Africa
- Died: 10 July 2023 (aged 80); Abidjan, Ivory Coast
- Education: Conservatoire libre du cinéma français
- Occupations: Film director, director of photography

Roger Gnoan M'Bala (1943 – 10 July 2023) was an Ivorian film director and screenwriter. His films are characterized by a blend of social critique and storytelling grounded in both traditional and contemporary African realities.

== Life and career ==
Born in Grand-Bassam, Ivory Coast in 1943, he studied history in Paris and film at the Conservatoire libre du cinéma français (CLCF) and later on in Sweden. From 1968 to 1978, he worked for the Radiodiffusion Télévision ivoirienne (RTI). before creating the 1970 black and white documentary on the traditional dance Koundoum. In 1972 he won the Silver Tanit at the Carthage Film Festival with the short Amanie and several other awards including a FIFEF. Thereafter he produced independently a short, Valisy and a medium-length satirical film, Le Chapeau. In 1984 he directed his first feature film, Ablakon. He became known thanks to his film Au nom du Christ, winning in 1993 a premio giovani at the Locarno International Film Festival and an Étalon de Yennenga at the FESPACO.

M'Bala died on 10 July 2023, at the age of 80.

== Filmography ==
=== Shorts ===
- Koundoum (1970)
- La Biche (1971)
- Amanie (1972)
- Gboundo (1974)
- Le Chapeau (1975)

=== Feature film ===
- Ablakon (1984)
- Bouka (1988)
- Au nom du Christ (1993)
- Adanggaman (2000)
- Le Peuple Niambwa (2009)
- Le Dipri (2009)

== See also ==
- Radiodiffusion Télévision ivoirienne
- Locarno International Film Festival
- Carthage Film Festival
