= Anna Stainer-Knittel =

Austrian painter (1841–1915)

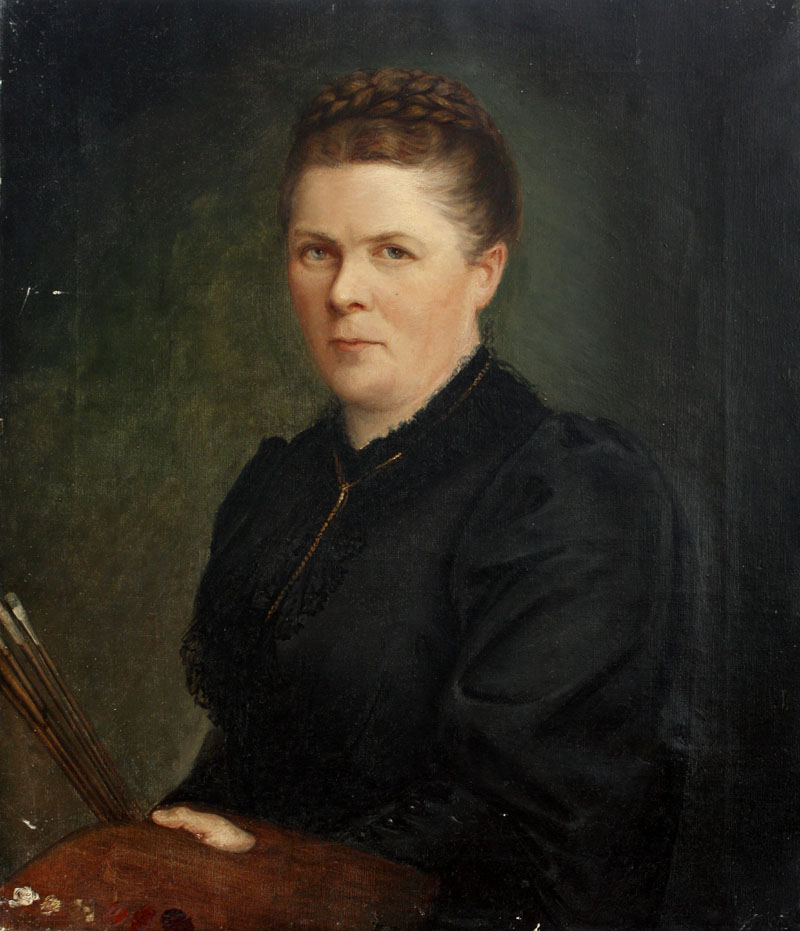
Self-portrait (before 1900)

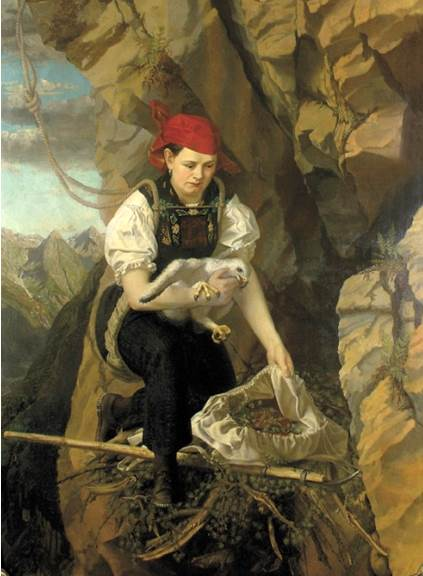
Self-portrait as the "Geier-Wally"

Anna Stainer-Knittel (28 July 1841, Elbigenalp - 28 February 1915, Wattens) was an Austrian portrait and flower painter. An incident from her life served as the basis for the novel The Vulture Maiden by Wilhelmine von Hillern.

== Biography ==
Her father was a gunsmith who had a quick temper but who encouraged his daughter's talents and ambitions. The sculptor, Josef Alois Knittel, was her uncle and the painter, Joseph Anton Koch, was her great-uncle.

She began her studies in 1859 at the Academy of Fine Arts, Munich, but she was not allowed to attend the main school because she was a woman. She had to return home in 1864 due to lack of funds. During this period, she painted numerous portraits of her family and landscape views. She later moved to Innsbruck and was able to support herself as a portrait painter. In 1867, against her parents' wishes, she married a ceramicist named Engelbert Stainer. During their time together, she created many floral designs for his cups, plates and saucers.

From 1868 to 1871, they had three children; two sons and a daughter. In 1873, she opened a painting school for women, which she operated almost until her death. Among her students were Maria Tilipaul-Kistler (1884-1963) and Wilhelmine Redlich (1869-1954).

== Fame as "Geier-Wally" ==
At the age of seventeen, Anna volunteered to rappel down a rock wall to remove an eagle's nest. In the 19th century, this was a common practice to prevent eagles from attacking the local sheep herds. The previous year, a similar attempt almost ended in tragedy for the climbers, so no other volunteers could be found. She was able to grab the eaglet, stuff him in her rucksack, and ascend without incident although, later, it was said that she was attacked by an adult eagle during the climb.

In 1863, this event was described by Ludwig Steub in his story, Das Annele im Adlerhorst Later, it was recounted in Wolfs Illustrirter Rundschau.

Finally, in 1875, it was depicted in a novel by Wilhelmine von Hillern called Die Geier-Wally (The Vulture Maiden in English; eagles were often derisively referred to as "vultures"). The author had become acquainted with Anna and her husband in Innsbruck and decided to render her story in a dramatic, Shakespearean style, naming her heroine "Walburga" (Wally) and dramatizing her conflicts with her father.

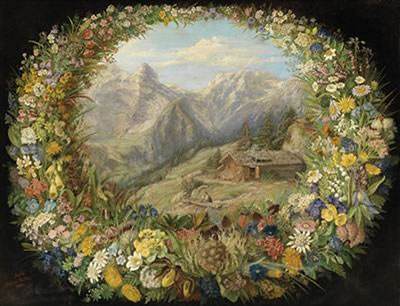
Alpine Landscape with Floral Wreath; one of her most popular paintings.

In 1892, the story was adapted for an opera: La Wally, by Alfredo Catalani. It has been filmed multiple times, notably:

- The Vulture Wally (1921), directed by E. A. Dupont, starring Henny Porten.
- The Vulture Wally (1940), directed by Hans Steinhoff, starring Heidemarie Hatheyer.
- The Vulture Wally (1956), directed by František Čáp, starring Barbara Rütting.
