= La Wally (film) =

1932 film

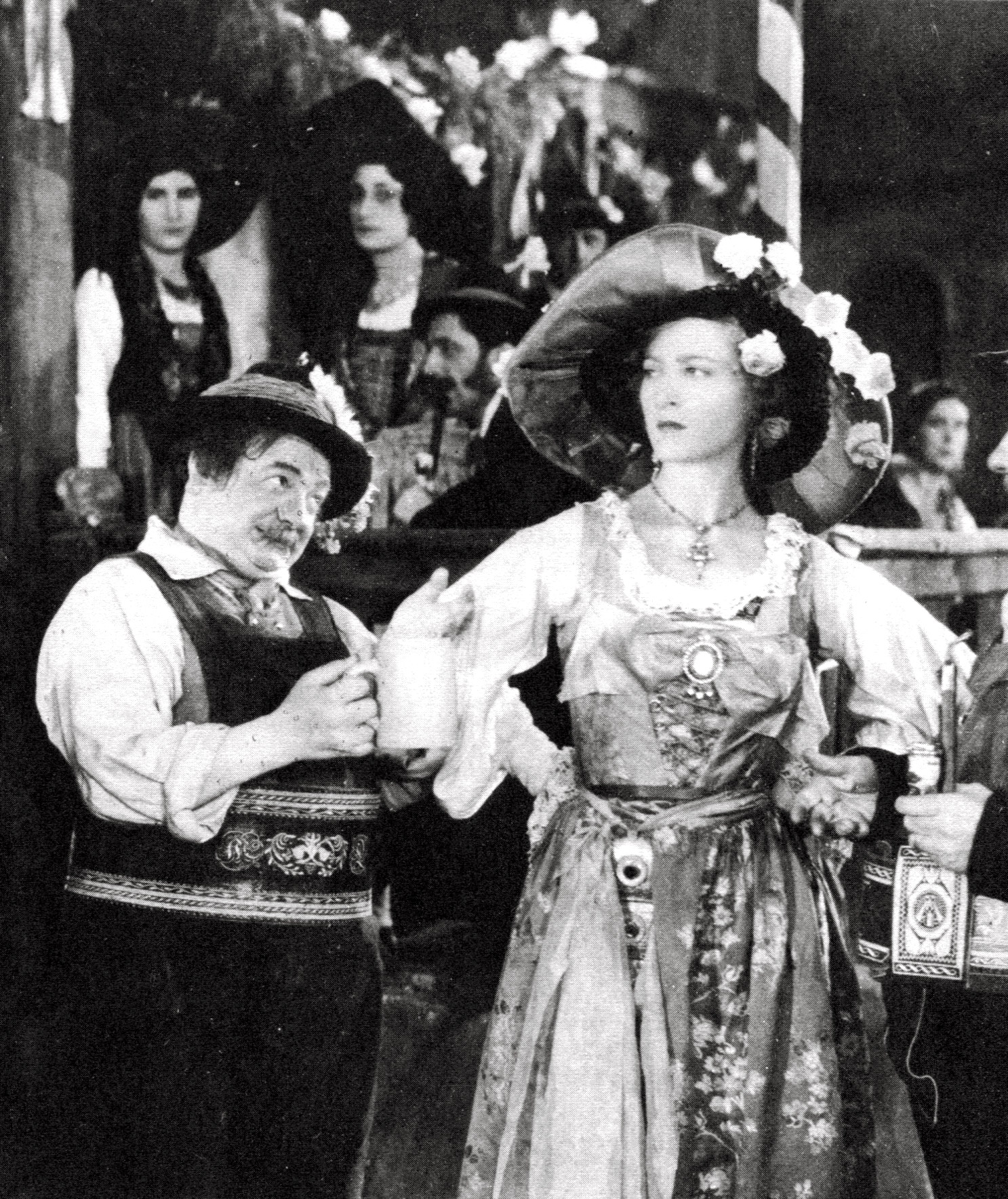
- Pierozzi and Paolieri in a film scene
- Directed by: Guido Brignone
- Written by: Wilhelmine von Hillern (novel); Luigi Illica (libretto); Gian Bistolfi
- Starring: Germana Paolieri; Isa Pola; Carlo Ninchi
- Cinematography: Ubaldo Arata
- Edited by: Giorgio Simonelli
- Production company: Società Italiana Cines
- Distributed by: Società Italiana Cines
- Release date: 10 October 1932
- Running time: 84 minutes
- Country: Italy
- Language: Italian

La Wally is a 1932 Italian musical drama film directed by Guido Brignone and starring Germana Paolieri, Isa Pola and Carlo Ninchi. It is an adaptation of the 1892 opera La Wally by Alfredo Catalani, which in turn is based on the novel The Vulture Maiden by Wilhelmine von Hillern. It was shot at the Cines Studios in Rome. The film's sets were designed by the art directors Gastone Medin and Ivo Perilli.

== Cast ==
- Germana Paolieri as Wally
- Isa Pola as Afra
- Carlo Ninchi as Hagenbach
- Achille Majeroni as Strominger
- Renzo Ricci as Vincenzo Gellner
- Gino Sabbatini as Walter
- Giuseppe Pierozzi as a farmer
- Amedeo Trilli

== See also ==
- The Vulture Wally (1921)
- La Leggenda di Wally (1930)
- The Vulture Wally (1940)
- The Vulture Wally (1956)

== Bibliography ==
- Poppi, Roberto. I registi: dal 1930 ai giorni nostri. Gremese Editore, 2002.
