= Diemer =

Diemer is a surname. Notable people with the surname include:

== Arts and entertainment ==
- Emma Lou Diemer (1927–2024), American composer
- Louis Diémer (1843–1919), French classical pianist and composer
- Michael Zeno Diemer (1867–1939), German painter

== Sports and pastimes ==
- Brian Diemer (born 1961), American middle distance runner
- Emil Josef Diemer (1908–1990), German chess player
- Kurt Diemer (1893–1953), German footballer

== Other ==
- Franz-Zeno Diemer (1889–1954), German aviator
- Helen Diemer, American architectural lighting designer
- Hugo Diemer (1870–1937), American engineer, consultant, professor, and management author
- Johann Heinrich Diemer (1904–1945), Dutch biologist
- Marv Diemer (1924–2013), American politician and businessman
- Walter Diemer (1904–1998), American inventor
