= The Vulture Wally =

The Vulture Wally may refer to:

- The Vulture Wally (1921 film), German silent film
- The Vulture Wally (1940 film), German film
- The Vulture Wally (1956 film), German film
