= The Vulture Maiden =

1875 novel by Wilhelmine von Hillern

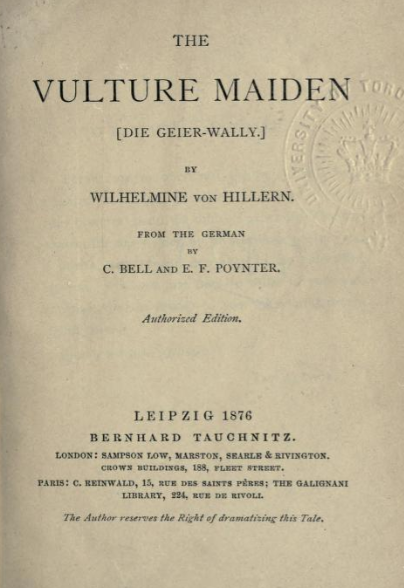
- Title page for The Vulture Maiden (1876 edition)
- Author: Wilhelmine von Hillern
- Original title: Die Geier-Wally
- Language: German
- Publisher: Deutsche Rundschau
- Publication date: January–February 1875
- Publication place: Germany
- Pages: 338

The Vulture Maiden (German: Die Geier-Wally. Eine Geschichte aus den Tiroler Alpen) is an 1875 novel by the German writer Wilhelmine von Hillern. It is about Walburga "Wally" Stromminger, a young woman in the Tyrolean Alps, who has a pet bearded vulture and goes through hardships and amorous intrigues. It was inspired by an episode in the life of Anna Stainer-Knittel.

The novel was serialised in Deutsche Rundschau in January and February 1875 and published as a book in two volumes by Paetel in Berlin the same year. It became highly popular in the German-speaking world. It influenced the popular view of the Alps and has been adapted multiple times for stage and screen, beginning with Hillern's own theatre adaptation in 1880.

== Adaptations ==
- Die Geier-Wally, 1880 play by Wilhelmine von Hillern
- La Wally, 1892 opera composed by Alfredo Catalani
- The Vulture Wally, 1921 German film directed by E. A. Dupont
- La Leggenda di Wally, 1930 Italian film directed by Gian Orlando Vassallo
- La Wally, 1932 Italian film directed by Guido Brignone, based on the opera
- The Vulture Wally, 1940 German film directed by Hans Steinhoff
- The Vulture Wally, 1956 West German film directed by František Čáp
- Die Geierwally, 1984 play, parody of the story
- Die Geierwally, 1987 film directed by Walter Bockmayer, based on the parody play
- Die Geierwally, 2005 Austrian-German television film directed by Peter Sämann
