= The Vulture Wally (1956 film) =

1956 film

- Directed by: Franz Cap
- Written by: Wolf Neumeister; Peter Ostermayr; Wilhelmine von Hillern (novel)
- Produced by: Ottmar Ostermayr
- Starring: Barbara Rütting; Carl Möhner; Heinrich Hauser
- Cinematography: Franz Koch
- Edited by: Claus von Boro
- Music by: Bernhard Eichhorn
- Production company: Peter Ostermayr Produktion
- Distributed by: Unitas-Film
- Release date: 30 August 1956
- Running time: 90 minutes
- Country: West Germany
- Language: German

The Vulture Wally (German: Die Geierwally) is a 1956 West German drama film directed by Franz Cap and starring Barbara Rütting, Carl Möhner and Heinrich Hauser. Based on The Vulture Maiden by Wilhelmine von Hillern, a popular novel which has had several film adaptations, it is part of the tradition of Heimatfilm.

The film's sets were designed by the art director Carl Ludwig Kirmse.

== Cast ==
- Barbara Rütting as Geierwally
- Carl Möhner as Bärenjosef
- Heinrich Hauser as Lorenz
- Til Kiwe as Vinzenz
- Maria Hofen as Luckard
- Franz Pfaudler as Höchstbauer
- Helga Neuner as Afra
- Walter Janssen as Curat
- Beppo Schwaiger as Benedikt
- Siegfried Rauch as Leander
- Gusti Kreissl as Retta
- Elinor von Wallerstein as Lammwirtin
- Ernst Reinhold as Bartl
- Anton Färber as Draxl
- Alfons Sailer as Anton
- Veronika Fitz as Rosa
- Fred Hennings as Pfarrer
- Franz Loskarn as Gendarm
- Alwin Emmert as Halbweger
- Viktor Afritsch as Jagdherr

== See also ==
- The Vulture Wally (1921)
- La Leggenda di Wally (1930)
- La Wally (1932, based on the opera)
- The Vulture Wally (1940)

== Bibliography ==
- Goble, Alan. The Complete Index to Literary Sources in Film. Walter de Gruyter, 1999.
