= Loreley (opera) =

1890 opera by Alfredo Catalani

- Opera by Alfredo Catalani
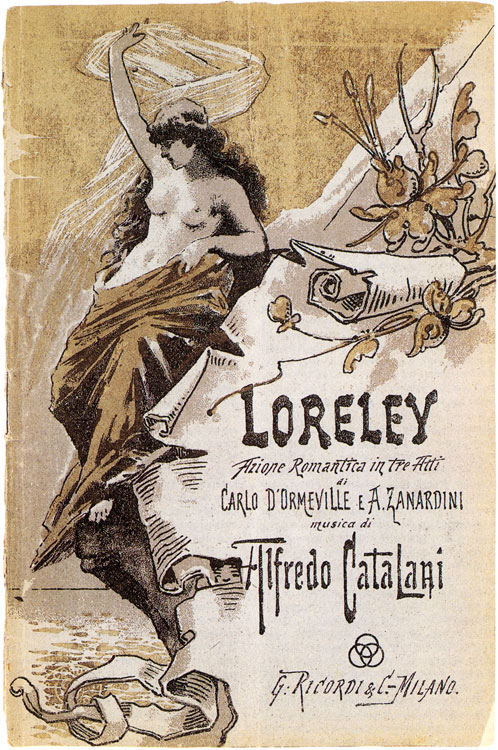
- Cover of the libretto published by Ricordi for the world premiere
- Librettist: Angelo Zanardini; Carlo D'Ormeville
- Premiere: 16 February 1890; Teatro Regio, Turin

Loreley is an opera (azione romantica) in three acts composed by Alfredo Catalani to a libretto by Angelo Zanardini, Carlo D'Ormeville and others. It premiered on 16 February 1890 at the Teatro Regio in Turin. Based on the German legend of the Lorelei, the opera is an extensive reworking of Catalani's four-act opera Elda which had premiered in Turin ten years earlier.

== Background and performance history ==
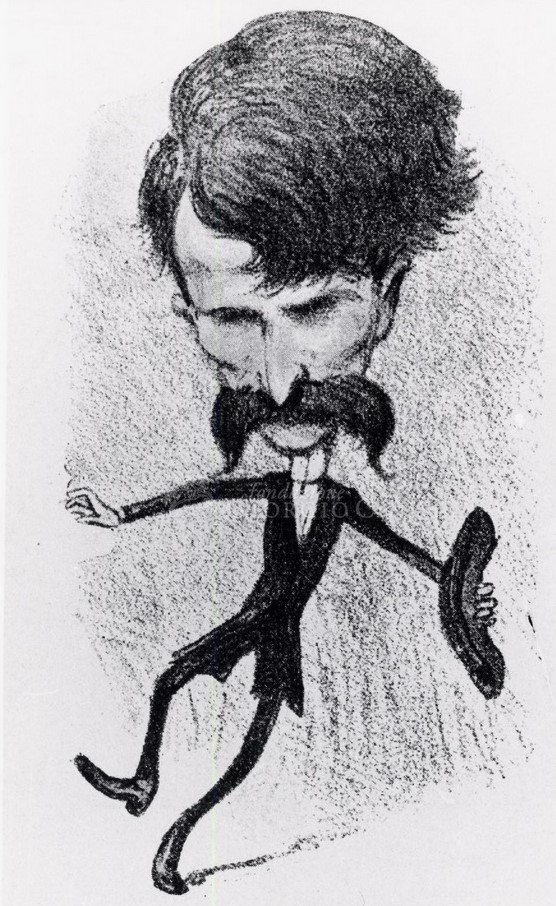
Caricature of Catalani after the success of Loreley in 1890

The praise received by Catalani's La falce, a one-act opera written while he was a student at the Milan Conservatory, led to Giovannina Lucca offering him a contract for more operas. Lucca ran the music publishing house Casa Musicale Lucca that had acquired the rights to publish Wagner's works in Italy. Elda, his first opera for Lucca premiered to critical success in 1880, followed by Dejanice in 1883 and Edmea in 1886. Neither of them had the critical success of Elda, but Edmea went on to be performed both in Italy and internationally. This prompted Lucca to commission a fourth opera from Catalani. Instead of finding a new libretto, he decided on a complete reworking of Elda which had based on the Lorelei myth. Carlo D'Ormeville's original libretto for Elda was primarily re-worked by Angelo Zanardini who had written the libretto for Dejanice, but the new Loreley libretto also had input Giuseppe Giacosa, Luigi Illica, and the music critic and impresario Giuseppe Depanis. Loreley kept the essential story of Elda but moved the setting back from the Baltic Sea to the Rhine River of the original myth.

Catalani completed the score of Loreley by November 1887. However, in early 1888, Casa Lucca was acquired by Ricordi. Catalani, by this time seriously ill with tuberculosis, fretted that Ricordi was ignoring his work and primarily concentrating on Puccini. Ricordi had published Puccini's Le Villi in 1884 and commissioned his Edgar for a La Scala production in 1889. The world premiere of Loreley finally took place on 16 February 1890 at the Teatro Regio in Turin conducted by Edoardo Mascheroni. The production, with Virginia Ferni Germano in the title role, had sets by Ugo Gheduzzi and costumes designed by Adolfo Hohenstein. It proved to be Catalani's most enduring work, surpassed only by his last opera La Wally. In the years following the Turin premiere, Loreley was performed in multiple Italian cities, including Milan where it was first performed at La Scala in 1905. It subsequently premiered at London's Royal Opera House on 12 July 1907. The first American performance was presented by the Chicago Opera Association at the Auditorium Building in Chicago on 17 January 1919 with Anna Fitziu in the title role.

Performances both in Italy and internationally continued well into the 20th century but became increasingly sporadic. It was revived in 1955 for performances at the Baths of Caracalla in Rome, the Teatro Comunale in Reggio Emilia, and the Teatro Grande in Brescia; in 1968 at La Scala; and in 1983 at the Teatro del Giglio in Lucca, Catalani's native city. By the 21st century, Loreley had been largely forgotten, although its arias are still sung in recitals, and excerpts from the opera were performed at the 2016 Bard Music Festival. In 2017, the entire opera was performed again in an open air production at the St. Galler Festspiele in Switzerland.

== Roles ==
Roles, voice types, premiere cast
Role	Voice type	Premiere cast, 16 February 1890 Conductor: Edoardo Mascheroni
Loreley, an orphan	soprano	Virginia Ferni Germano
Walter, lord of Oberwesel	tenor	Eugenio (Eugène) Durot
Anna di Rehberg, niece of the margrave	soprano	Eleonora (Leonora) Dexter
Hermann, baron	baritone	Enrico Stinco-Palermini
Rodolfo, margrave of Biberich	bass	Natale Pozzi

== Synopsis ==
Setting: the banks of the Rhine in 1500

Act 1

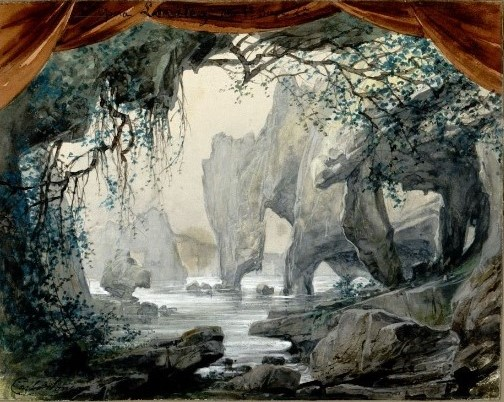
Set for act, 1, scene 2, from the 1906 production at La Scala

Walter is betrothed to Anna of Rehberg, niece of the Margrave of Biberich. One May evening while wandering on the banks of the Rhine, Walter encounters the beautiful orphan Loreley and seduces her. He summons his friend Hermann and tells him that he is torn between "lawful and unlawful love". Although Hermann is himself in love with Anna, he counsels Walter to be true to his fiancée. When Walter next encounters Loreley, he tells her that although he loves her, he will marry Anna. He leaves Loreley who has fallen to the ground in a faint. Herman, lamenting that he has yielded his beloved Anna to such a man, appeals to the God of the Rhine and dedicates himself to avenging the wrong done to Anna.

The Nymphs of the Rhine and the Spirits of the Air appear and sing in praise of the River God and the God Thor, the lord of the tempest. Loreley comes to them lamenting her lost honour and asking how she can avenge her wrongs. The nymphs and spirits tell her that she must make herself irresistible which will then torture the faithless Walter. When she asks how she can do this, they reply that she must call upon Alberich, the King of the Rhine, and swear to him the fidelity of a bride. She swears the oath, flings herself into the Rhine, and rises transfigured with the golden hair and the golden comb of the legendary Loreley. The curtain falls as she exclaims: "Walter, I have risen to avenge myself."

Act 2

In the midst of preparations for Walter and Anna's wedding, Hermann warns Anna that she is about to give herself to a faithless man. Nevertheless, the wedding procession to the church begins. At this point the sky begins to glow with a mysterious light. Loreley appears and sings a love song to Walter. He casts Anna aside and rushes into the arms of Loreley crying "I am yours, be mine." Instead, Loreley flings herself into the river leaving Walter on his knees. As Anna falls lifeless to the ground, Loreley reappears on a rock in the river.

Act 3

As the funeral of Anna takes place, the grief-stricken Walter falls into a faint on the shores of the river. When he awakes, he sees Loreley sitting on her rocky throne and hears her singing a love song to him. She is about to embrace him when menacing voices from the depths of the river remind her of her oath to Alberich. She tears herself away from Walter and returns to the rock. In a frenzy, Walter throws himself into the river and drowns as Loreley continues her song.

== Recordings ==
Individual arias from Loreley have been recorded by various singers, including Claudia Muzio, Celestina Boninsegna, Magda Olivero, Beniamino Gigli, and Mario Del Monaco. There are three complete recordings of the opera, originally released on LP and later reissued on CD: (Note: The labels listed are for the most recent CD releases)

- 1954: Anna de Cavalieri (Loreley), Ken Neate (Walter), Piero Guelfi (Hermann), Rina Gigli (Anna di Rehberg); Orchestra e Coro della RAI conducted by Alfredo Simonetto. Recorded for broadcast 15 December 1954. Label: Gala
- 1963: Gigliola Frazzoni (Lorley), Luigi Infantino (Walter), Piero Guelfi (Hermann), Dora Carral (Anna di Rehberg), Leonardo Monreale, Rodolfo, Armando la Rosa Parodi conducting the Orchestra e Coro della RAI di Roma, 27 Marzo 1963. Label: Gigliola Frazzoli Records
- 1968: Elena Suliotis (Loreley), Gianfranco Cecchele (Walter), Piero Cappuccilli (Hermann), Rita Talarico (Anna di Rehberg); La Scala Orchestra and Chorus conducted by Gianandrea Gavazzeni. Recorded live in Milan 13 February 1968. Label: Opera d'Oro
- 1982: Martha Colalillo (Loreley), Piero Visconti (Walter), Alessandro Cassis (Herrmann), Maria Luisa Garbato (Anna di Rehberg); Orchestra and Chorus of the Teatro del Giglio conducted by Napoleone Annovazzi. Recorded live in Lucca 19 September 1982. Label: Bongiovanni
