= Virginia Ferni Germano =

Italian musician (1849–1934)

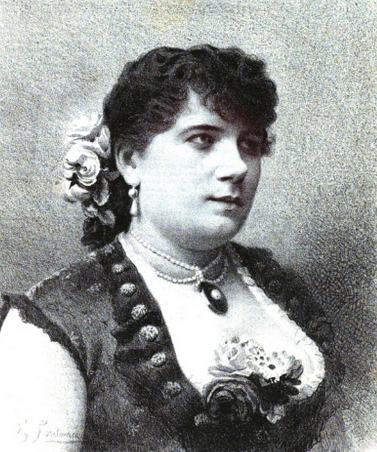
Virginia Ferni Germano, from an 1885 publication.

Virginia Ferni Germano (16 December 1849 – 4 February 1934) was an Italian lyric soprano opera singer.

== Early life ==
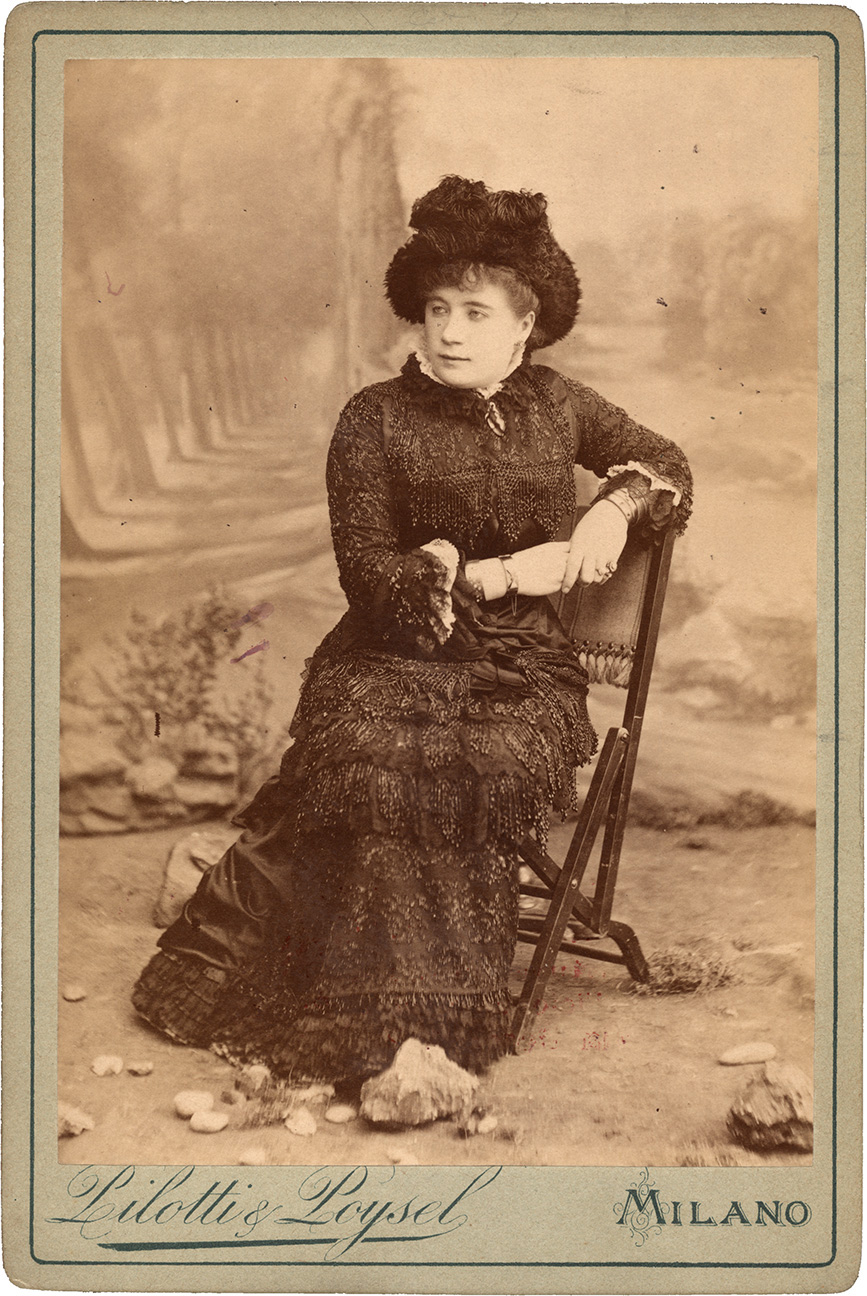
Virginia Ferni Germano

Ferni was born in Turin to actress Francesca and cellist Antonio Ferni. Her siblings Angelo and Teresa were musicians, too. She studied violin and voice as a girl.

== Career ==
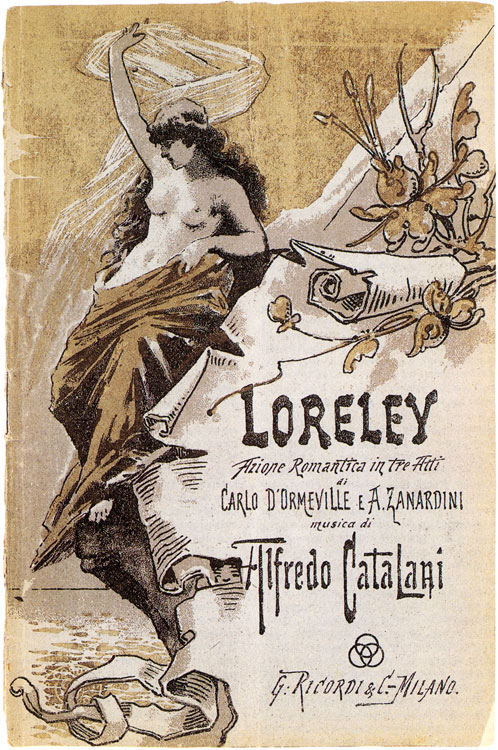
Loreley libretto cover, 1890

Ferni debuted on the opera stage in 1876, in Charles Gounod's Faust, at Madrid's Teatro Reale. She was the first to play Bizet's Carmen in Italian, at Milan's La Scala in 1885. She created the title role of Alfredo Catalani's Edmea when it premiered in 1896, and of Catalani's Loreley, when it was first performed in 1890.

Arturo Toscanini made his professional conducting debut in Italy for an 1886 performance of Edmea starring Ferni. Her 1886 appearance as Mignon in Milan prompted a London newspaper correspondent to comment that "her appearance is, to say the least, hardly suited for portraying a very youthful gipsy girl" and concede that "her matured artistic abilities and fine voice sustain the part in a manner highly acceptable to her auditors".

After retiring from the stage, Ferni taught voice in Turin. Among her students were Alba Anzelotti, Bianca Lenzi and Marisa Morel.

== Personal life ==
Ferni married Carlo Germano, a violinist. Their son Carlo (1880–1916) was also a violinist. She died in 1934 in Turin, aged 84.

== Legacy ==
Ferni Germano's autographed photos of other performers are archived in the Fondazione Giorgio Cini art collections.
