= Virginia Guerrini =

Italian opera singer (1871–1948)

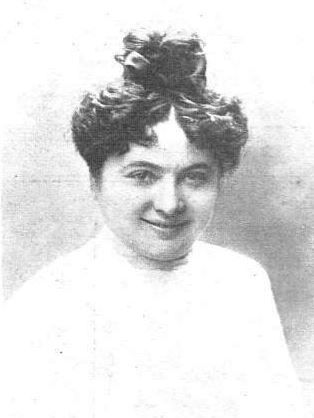
Virginia Guerrini.jpg

Virginia Guerrini (20 February 1871, Brescia – 26 February 1948, Brescia) was an Italian operatic mezzo-soprano. She made her professional opera debut at the Garibaldi Theatre in Treviso as Elsa in Richard Wagner's Lohengrin in 1889. The following year, she made her debuts at the Teatro Lirico Giuseppe Verdi as Laura in La Gioconda, the Teatro Dal Verme in Milan as Adalgisa in Vincenzo Bellini's Norma, the Liceu in Ortrud in Lohengrin, and at the Teatro Regio in Turin as Loretta in Alberto Franchetti's Asrael.

In 1892, Guerrini made her debut at La Scala as Adalagisa. During her time at La Scala, she performed in several world premieres, including the role of Afra in Alfredo Catalani's La Wally (1892) and Meg Page in Falstaff (1893). Other roles she sang at La Scala included both Anacoana and Iguamota in Alberto Franchetti's Cristoforo Colombo, Emilia in Otello, Nefte in Ponchielli's Il figliuol prodigo. She also appeared in major opera houses in South America, Russia, Germany, Spain, and Portugal during her career.

After retiring from the stage in 1925, Guerrini taught singing in her native city of Brescia. She died there in 1948.
