= Silvano Carroli =

Italian singer (1939–2020)

Silvano Carroli (22 February 1939 – 4 April 2020) was an Italian baritone.

== Biography ==
Carroli was born in Venice. Orphaned as a result of his father's death at only six years of age, he began to attend the oratory of the Basilica of San Marco, but family needs prevented him from continuing the study of music. After getting engaged to his future wife, he decided to pursue a career as an opera singer.

He studied with the teacher Marcello Del Monaco and perfected later with Mario Del Monaco. Later he was admitted to the training school of the La Fenice Theater in Venice, under the guidance of the masters Mario Labroca, Francesco Siciliani and Floris Ammannati, making his debut in 1963 as Marcello in Giacomo Puccini's La bohème, alongside Mirella Freni and Giacomo Aragall, the opera was directed by Franco Zeffirelli.

Already in 1966 he began to face the most demanding roles in the repertoire. From Verdi he played Ezio in Attila, Jago in Othello, Renato in Un ballo in maschera, Don Carlo in La Forza del Destino, Monforte in I vespri siciliani, Giorgio Germont in La traviata, Simon Boccanegra, Macbeth, Nebuchadnezzar in Nabucco, Roger in Jérusalem and Pagano in I Lombardi at the first crusade, Amonasro in Aida.

Also by other composers, he played Jack Rance in La fanciulla del West, Michele in Il tabarro, Scarpia in Tosca, Alfio in Cavalleria rusticana, Barnaba in La Gioconda, Tonio in Pagliacci, Gianciotto in Francesca da Rimini, Enrico in Lucia di Lammermoor, Il Duca D 'Alba and the High Priest of Samson et Dalila.

He sang with other opera stars, including Boris Christoff, Mario Del Monaco, Magda Olivero, Carlo Bergonzi, Cesare Siepi, Raina Kabaivanska, Ghena Dimitrova, Montserrat Caballé, Maria Dragoni, Plácido Domingo, Luciano Pavarotti, José Carreras, Nicolai Ghiaurov, and was under the guidance of famous directors, such as James Levine, Carlos Kleiber, Zubin Mehta, Peter Maag, Wolfgang Sawallisch, Franco Capuana, Francesco Molinari Pradelli, Giuseppe Sinopoli, Bruno Bartoletti and Claudio Abbado.

in August 2007 at the Arena di Verona he successfully added to the baritone interpretations to that as the bass in the role of Verdi of Zaccaria (there are some live recordings where he sings also in the tenor register).

in 2008 he was a protagonist in two productions of La fanciulla del West: in Rome and at the Covent Garden (with Josè Cura and the direction of Antonio Pappano). In 2009 he was Scarpia in Tel Aviv, under Daniel Oren's wand. In the same year he was then Amonasro in Verona.

While continuing his artistic activity, Carroli also dedicated himself for years to teaching and held the chair of singing at the school for tenors of the Del Monaco Foundation. He died in Lucca, aged 81.

== Repertoire ==
- Georges Bizet
  - Carmen (Escamillo)
- Alfredo Catalani
  - La Wally (Gellner)
- Gaetano Donizetti
  - Lucia di Lammermoor (Lord Enrico Asthon)
  - Il Duca d'Alba (Duca d'Alba)
- Umberto Giordano
  - Andrea Chénier (Carlo Gérard)
- Charles Gounod
  - Faust (Mephistopheles)
- Ruggero Leoncavallo
  - Pagliacci (Prologo, Tonio)
- Pietro Mascagni
  - Cavalleria rusticana (Compar Alfio)
  - Isabeau (Re Raimondo)
- Giacomo Meyerbeer
  - L'Africana (Nelusko)
- Wolfgang Amadeus Mozart
  - Don Giovanni (Don Giovanni)
- Amilcare Ponchielli
  - La Gioconda (Barnaba)
- Giacomo Puccini
  - La bohème (Marcello)
  - Tosca (Il barone Scarpia)
  - Madama Butterfly (Sharpless)
  - La fanciulla del West (Jack Rance)
  - Il tabarro (Michele)
  - Gianni Schicchi (Gianni Schicchi)
- Gioachino Rossini
  - Moïse et Pharaon (Faraone)
- Camille Saint-Saëns
  - Samson et Dalila (Il sommo sacerdote di Dagone)
- Giuseppe Verdi
  - Nabucco (Nabucodonosor, Zaccaria)
  - I Lombardi alla prima crociata (Pagano)
  - Attila (Ezio)
  - Macbeth (Macbeth)
  - Jérusalem (Roger)
  - Il corsaro (Seid)
  - Rigoletto (Rigoletto)
  - Il trovatore (Il Conte di Luna)
  - La traviata (Giorgio Germont)
  - I vespri siciliani (Guido di Monforte)
  - Simon Boccanegra (Simon Boccanegra)
  - Un ballo in maschera (Renato)
  - La forza del destino (Don Carlo di Vargas)
  - Aida (Amonasro)
  - Otello (Jago)
- Richard Wagner
  - Lohengrin (Federico di Telramondo)
- Riccardo Zandonai
  - Francesca da Rimini (Gianciotto)

== Disks ==
Audio

- Catalani - La Wally - Olivero, Carroli, Zambon - Live 1972
- Donizetti - Lucia di Lammermoor - Mazzola, Morino, Carroli - Live Napoli 1989
- Mascagni - Cavalleria Rusticana - Domingo, Carroli - Arena di Verona - Live 1977
- Mascagni - Cavalleria Rusticana - Lamberti, Jones, Carroli - Live 1987 Munich
- Mascagni - Cossotto, Martinucci, Carroli Santi Verona 1987
- Mascagni - Carroli, Berini, Vanzo Suzan Marseille 1976
- Mascagni - Casolla, Johansson, Carroli Gavazzeni Firenze 1991
- Puccini - La Fanciulla del West - Dimitrova, Bonisolli, Carroli Sinopoli Berlin 1982
- Puccini - La Fanciulla del West - Dessì, Armiliato, Carroli - Live Roma 2008
- Puccini - La Fanciulla del West - Carroli Westbroek Cura Pappano London 2009
- Puccini - La Fanciulla del West - Carroli MJ Johnson Frusoni Latham Koenig Caracalla 1988
- Puccini - La Fanciulla del West - Carroli S Larson, Popov Arena Verona 1986
- Puccini - Tosca - Caballé, Todisco, Carroli - Live 1983
- Puccini - Tosca - Miricioiu, G. Lamberti, Carroli - Alexander Rahbari - Live Studio Naxos
- Puccini - Tosca - Carroli, Casolla Todisco Oren Verona 1989
- Puccini - Tosca - Carroli, He, A. Richards Oren Verona 2006
- Puccini - Tosca - Carroli, Cedolins, Martinucci Lynn-Wilson Verona
- Verdi - Aida - Giacomini, Carroli - Live Caracalla Roma
- Verdi - Aida - Giuliacci, Carroli - Oren - Live Roma 2009
- Verdi - Aida - Borin, Hui He, Carroli - Oren - Live Arena di Verona 2009
- Verdi - Aida - Nizza, Cornetti, Giuliacci, Spotti Oren Verona 2006
- Verdi - La forza del Destino - Caballé, Carroli - Live 1982
- Verdi - Macbeth - Carroli, Martinucci - Live
- Verdi - Otello - Domingo, Tomowa-Sintow, Carroli - Kleiber - Live Tokio 1981
- Verdi - Un ballo in maschera - Pavarotti, Caballé, Carroli - live 1982 San Francisco
- Verdi - Un ballo in maschera - Chiara, Carroli, Gilmore, Ferrarini, Lima Kuhn Verona 1984
- Verdi - Attila - Chiara, Giaiotti, Carroli, Malagnini Santi Verona 1986
- Verdi - Attila - Zampieri, Carroli, Ghiuselev, Beccaria Masini Napoli 1987
- Verdi - Attila - Cruz-Romo, Carroli, Ghiaurov, Luchetti Bartoletti Chicago 1981
- Meyerbeer - L'Africaine - Carroli, Bumbry Domingo Atherton London 1981
- Meyerbeer - L'Africaine - Carroli, Bumbry Bonisolli Atherton London 1981
- Giordano - Andrea Chenier - Carroli, Ligabue Vickers Rescigno Dallas 1973
- Donizetti - Il Duca D'Alba - Carroli, Krilovici Garaventa De Fabritiis Bruxelles 1979
- Ponchielli - Gioconda - Carroli Casolla Cossotto Pecile Beccaria Verducci Renzetti Verona 1988
- Ponchielli - Gioconda - Carroli Casolla V.Cortez Beccaria Gioaiotti Renzetti Verona 1988
- Verdi - Il Trovatore - Carroli S.Dunn Zajick Bonisolli Skinner Meltzer San Francisco 1986
- Verdi - Nabucco - Carroli Dimitrova Nesterenko Ysas Ruiz Gandolfi Barcelona 1984
- Verdi - Nabucco - Carroli Roark-Strummer, Nesterenko Jjori Todisco Oren Verona 1988
- Verdi - Nabucco - Carroli Roark Strummer Nesterenko Schiatti Tieppo Oren Verona 1988
- Verdi - Nabucco - Carroli Vejzovic Jankovic Storojev Todisco Gandolfi Caracalla 1985
- Verdi - Nabucco - Carroli Gulegina Surguladse Nucci (Carroli canta il ruolo di Zaccaria) Borin Oren Verona 2008
- Verdi - Nabucco - Carroli Roark-Strummer Nesterenko Patti Tieppo Tolomelli Verona 1988
- Rossini - Mosè - Carroli Casapietra Casoni Limarilli Siepi Gavazzeni Firenze 1974
- Saint-Saëns - Sansone e Dalila - Carroli Cossotto Vinco Maag Verona 1974(in Italiano)
- Saint-Saëns - Sansone e Dalila - Carroli Baltsa Domingo C.Davis London 1995
- Mascagni - Isabeau - Carroli Pobbe Zannini Ferraro Mazzini Rapallo Napoli 1972
- Verdi - Rigoletto - Carroli Ferrarini Meneghelli Sempere Luperi Santi Verona 1988
- Verdi - Rigoletto - Carroli Ferrarini Schiatti Sempere Luperi Santi Verona 1988
- Verdi - Jerusalem - Carroli Gasdia Luchetti Renzetti Paris 1984
- Wagner - Lohengrin - Carroli Ricciarelli Berini Cava Zecchillo Bartoletti Venezia 1973 (In Italiano)
- Leoncavallo - Pagliacci - Carroli Kabaivanska Vickers L.Carlson Rescigno Dallas 1972
- Verdi - Forza del Destino - Carroli Ross, Vighi, Limarilli, Vinco, M.Basiola jr Rossi Venezia 1966
- Verdi - Otello - Carroli Domingo M.Price C.Kleiber London 1981
- Verdi - Otello - Carroli Ricciarelli, Cossutta Guadagno Cyprus 1996
- Verdi - Otello - Carroli Tomowa-Sintow, Domingo C.Kleiber La Scala a Tokio 1980
- Album - The very best of Puccini - Gauci, Carroli, Orgonasova, G.Lamberti, Miricioiu - CD Naxos

DVD

- Bizet - Carmen - Obraztsova, Ferrarini, Carreras Delacote Barcelona 1983
- Verdi - Attila - Chiara, Giaiotti, Luchetti Santi Verona 1986
- Verdi - Attila - Chiara, Ghiuselev, Luchetti Santi Torino 1983
- Puccini - Gianni Schicchi - Carroli - Teatro Filarmonico Verona
- Puccini - Il Tabarro - Domingo, Carroli - Madrid Live 1982
- Puccini - La Fanciulla del West - Dimitrova, Domingo - Live
- Puccini - La Fanciulla del West - Neblett, Domingo, Carroli - Santi - Royal Opera House di Londra
- Verdi - Aida - Giacomini, Carroli - Arena di Verona
- Verdi - Aida - Sweet, Zajick, Scuderi, Giaiotti Steinberg Verona 1990
- Verdi - Aida - Chiara, Baglioni, Cecchele, Vinco Renzetti Luxor 1987
- Verdi - Attila - Nesterenko, Chiara, Carroli, Luchetti - Santi - Arena di Verona 1985
- Verdi - I Lombardi alla Prima Crociata - Carreras, Dimitrova, Carroli - Gavazzeni - Teatro la Scala
- Verdi - Otello - Carroli Lorengar Domingo Navarro Madrid 1985
- Verdi - Rigoletto - Carroli - Arena di Verona 1991
- Gounod - Faust - Carroli, Aragall, Dessì, Sardinero - Lombard - Teatro Comunale Bologna 1985
- Zandonai - Francesca da Rimini - Cura, Carroli, Kabaivanska - Teatro Massimo di Palermo 1995
- Zandonai - Francesca da Rimini - Nizza, Michailov, Carroli - Teatro dell'Opera di Roma 2003
- Verdi - Nabucco - Carroli Roark-Strummer Nesterenko Patti Tieppo Tolomelli Verona 1988
- Verdi - Jerusalem - Carroli Gasdia Luchetti Renzetti Paris 1984
- Verdi - Forza del Destino - Carroli Caballe, Mattiucci, Mauro, Plishka, Bacquier Gomez-Martinez Orange 1982
- Verdi - Otello - Carroli Tomowa-Sintow, Domingo C.Kleiber La Scala a Tokio 1980
