= Berthold Schwarz =

Legendary inventor of gunpowder

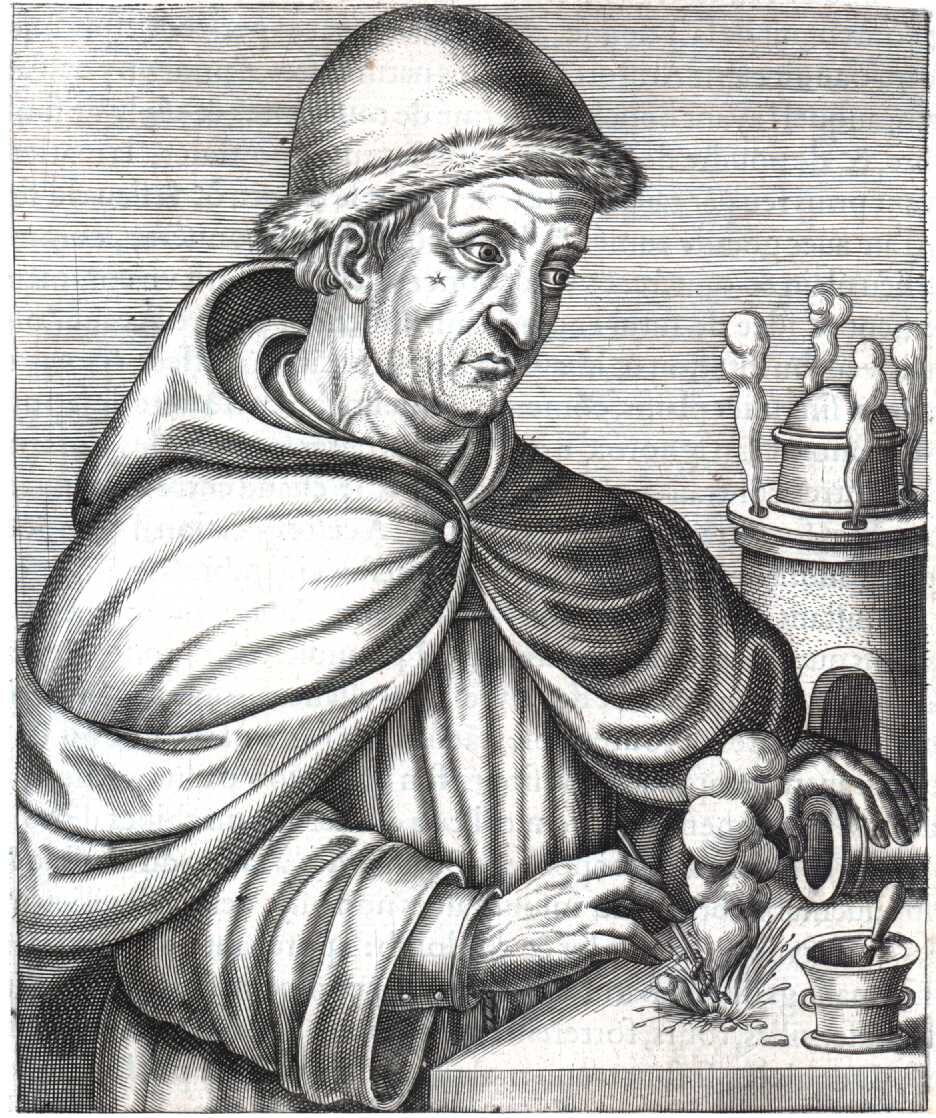
Portrait identifying Schwarz as the "inventor of artillery"

Berthold Schwarz O.F.M. (sometimes spelled Schwartz), also known as Berthold the Black and der Schwartzer, was a legendary German (or in some accounts Danish or Greek) alchemist of the late 14th century, credited with the invention of gunpowder by 15th- through 19th-century European literature.

The purported period of Schwarz's activity (in the late 14th century) thus falls between the first reports of gunpowder in Europe in the late 13th century and the development of effective applications in artillery in the mid-15th century.

It is unclear whether Schwarz is a historical person. It has been suggested that he was indeed a historical alchemist who developed gunpowder in Germany, but other scholars consider him purely legendary.

== Identity ==
Schwarz is possibly identical with Bertold von Lützelstetten, a scholar who is recorded as "magister artium Bertoldus" at the University of Paris from 1329 to 1336. Other sources identify him with one Konstantin Angeleisen (or Anklitzen), who was persecuted for being an alchemist and had to flee to Prague, where he was executed in 1388.

It is also possible that Schwarz is not a historical person at all, but rather a symbolic inventor figure taking his name from that of Schwarzpulver, "black powder", the German term for gunpowder.

== Accounts ==
The first reference to Schwarz is found in an anonymous manual of pyrotechnics that dates to c. 1410, preserved in various 15th-century copies. The relevant passage credits an alchemist and Master of Arts, "Master Berthold" (maister perchtold), with the accidental discovery of gunpowder, without giving any further details as to time or place.

Such details are first reported by Franz Helm, an author active in Landshut during the 1520s to 1530s, who was also the first to introduce the epithet "the Black" (in Latinized form, as niger). According to Helm,

Item hir ist zu wissen wer dz puluer vnd dz geschitz erdacht vnd erfunden hat, der ist gewessen ain Bernhardinerminch mit namen Bartoldus nigersten [...] Da man zelt 1380 Jar. [...] Der bartoldus niger ist vonn wegen der kunst die er erfunden vnd erdacht hat gerichtet worden vom leben zum todt Im 1388. Jar.
"Here is told who first invented powder and guns, this was a Bernhardian monk called Bartoldus nigersten ... in the year 1380 ... bartoldus niger was executed for the art he had invented in the year 1388."

Feldhaus (1910) thinks that reports of a "Master Berthold" in the early 15th century, barely 25 years after this master's death, should be taken seriously as historical testimony of an alchemist Berthold, called "the Black", member of the Order of St. Bernard, who developed a recipe for effective gunpowder in c. 1380, and who was possibly executed as a magician some years later. The recipes given in the 15th-century German manuals for pyrotechnics would then be directly derived from the recipe as developed by Berthold.

This historical Master Berthold, who would not have invented gunpowder ex nihilo but would rather have developed an effective recipe which opened technological possibilities and initiated the development of gunpowder warfare during the 15th century, is likened by Feldhaus to James Watt, who did not so much "invent" the steam engine as improve the invention of Denis Papin to a point where its application became worthwhile.

== Legacy ==
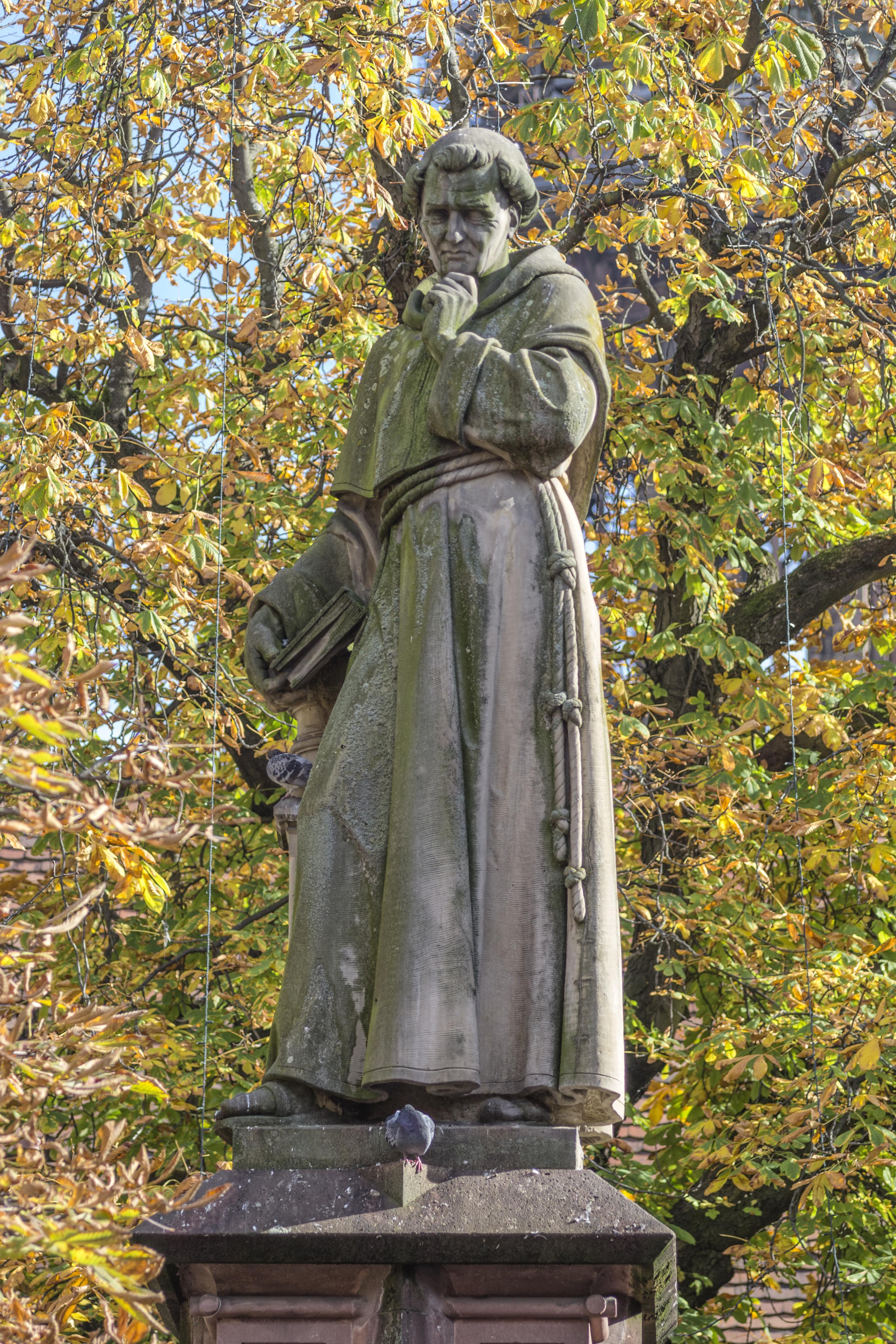
Berthold Schwarz, by Josef Alois Knittel

In 1853, a monument to Berthold Schwarz was erected in Freiburg im Breisgau, Germany. It was designed by Josef Alois Knittel.

Johann Anzengruber – the less successful father of Austrian playwright Ludwig Anzengruber – wrote a play about Berthold Schwarz, which was produced in 19th-century Vienna and was notable for the spectacular explosion at the end.

== See also ==
- History of gunpowder
