= Franz-Zeno Diemer =

German flight pioneer

Franz Zeno Diemer
- Born: July 3, 1889; Oberammergau, Bavaria, German Empire
- Died: April 17, 1954 (aged 64); Friedrichshafen, Baden-Württemberg, West Germany
- Known for: BMW test pilot, setting numerous world records 1917-1920
- Aviation career
- Flight license: 1912; Bavaria
- Air force: Bavarian Lifeguard Regiment; flight regiment Bogohl 8
- Rank: Flight Officer

Franz Zeno Diemer (3 July 1889, in Oberammergau – 17 April 1954, in Friedrichshafen) was a flight pioneer in Bavaria, setting a number of world records, and Flight Officer for Bavarian Lifeguard Regiment.

== Early life ==
He was born in Oberammergau, Bavaria, the son of the painter, Michael Zeno Diemer and his wife, Hermine (née Von Hillern), eldest daughter of the writer, Wilhelmine von Hillern. Trained as an engineer, in 1912 he joined the Bavarian Lifeguard Regiment, at that time a flying squadron. He was a member of "Bogohl 8" (the bomber squadron operated by the Senior Military Command) with the rank of Flying Officer.

In July 1921 he joined Dornier in Friedrichshafen as a test pilot and for trial flying of new aircraft. In 1922, after Dornier's move to Marina di Pisa Italy, he worked as a test pilot, head of the aerodynamics department and manager of the advertising department. From 1935 on he worked exclusively as manager of the advertising department and was editor in chief of the company newspaper "Dornier-Post" which appeared from the autumn of 1935 until July 1938.

From August 1939 to the end 1944, he was in the German Air Force, but post World War II he rejoined Dornier and assumed charge of the suggestions scheme, retiring in March 1946.

== Functions at BMW ==
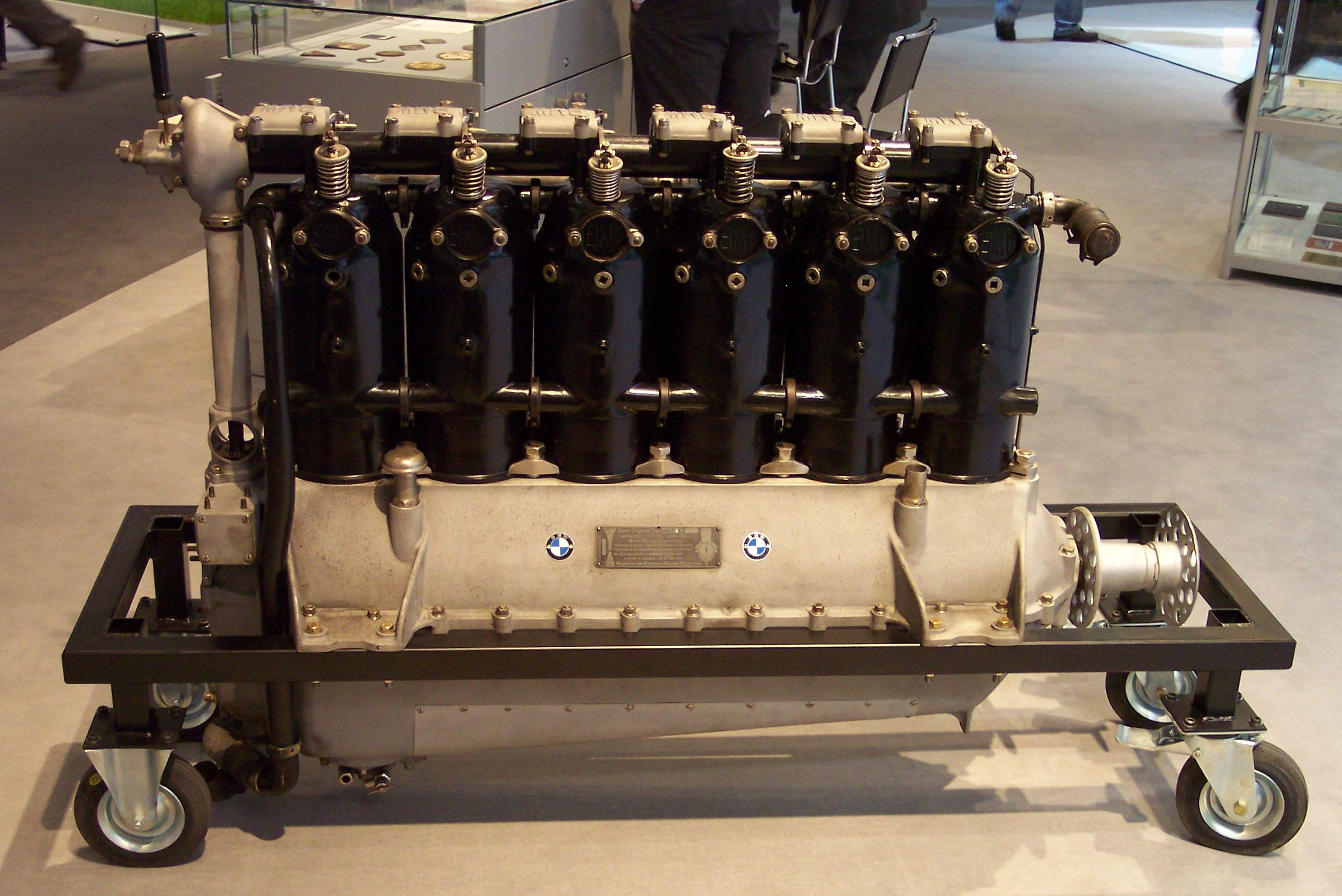
BMW IVa- This engine set the World Altitude record in 1919 by Franz Zeno Diemer

Test pilot for BMW.

On 17 June 1919 he flew a DFW F37 (Note: Lewin identifies the aircraft only as "the DFW airframe", while Norbye claims it was "a wartime Fokker biplane".) powered by a BMW IV engine to an unofficial world record height of 9,760 m (32,021 ft) from Oberwiesenfeld, reaching that altitude in 89 min.

On 13 September 1919 he set a world altitude record for a passenger aircraft (8 people on board, 6,750 m (22,146 ft)) in a Junkers F.13 powered by a BMW IIIa aircraft engine (the pilot, however, may have been Moes).

== Later in Life ==
Died in Friedrichshafen.

== See also ==
- History of BMW
- Rapp Motorenwerke
