= Edmea =

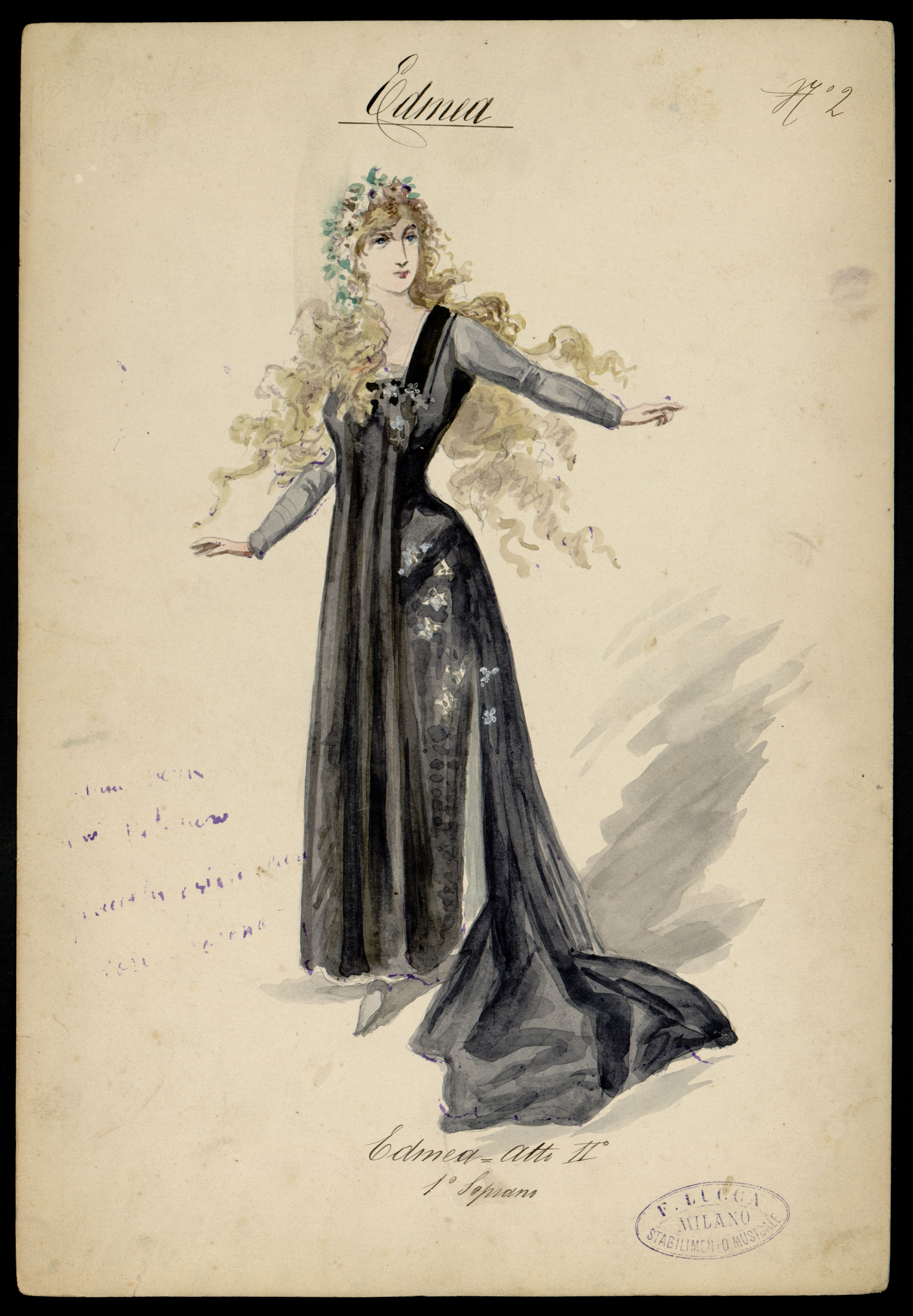
Costume design by Alfredo Edel for Virginia Ferni-Germano as the titular heroine in the original production, Act 2

Edmea is an 1886 opera in three acts by Alfredo Catalani to a libretto by Antonio Ghislanzoni.

== Cast of the première ==
The opera was first performed on 27 February 1886 at the Teatro alla Scala in Milan. The cast of that first performance was:

- Conductor: Franco Faccio
- Edmea: Virginia Ferni-Germano
- Oberto: Gaetano Ortisi
- Fritz: Giovanni Paroli
- Ulmo: Francesco Pozzi
- Conte Leitmeritz: Napoleone Limonta
- Barone Waldeck: Raffaele Terzi
- Oste: Giuseppe Tonali

== Plot ==
XVII century: the action takes place in Bohemia, in a castle on the banks of the Elbe river and in its vicinity.

=== Act I ===
Edmea is saddened by Oberto's imminent departure on a long journey. Oberto and Edmea meet again one last time and swear by the picture of his deceased mother to love each other forever. Ulmo too is in love with Edmea even though he knows of her feelings for Oberto. He hopes that Oberto's absence will make it possible to win Edmea's heart.

The Count knows and disapproves of the love between his son, Oberto, and Edmea. He decides, by virtue of his authority, that Edmea will marry Ulmo. Ulmo asks Edmea to marry him and live as brother and sister if she cannot love him, but Edmea does not agree. Obliged to sign the wedding deed, and in despair, Edmea throws herself into the River Elbe in which, following her, Ulmo also disappears.

=== Act II ===
Edmea and Ulmo have escaped the river, but Edmea, having lost her reason, believes she is the Elbe fairy in search of a king who once loved her. The two arrive at a tavern, where Ulmo introduces himself as Edmea's brother. As the host refuses to house them, they are invited by Fritz and other jesters to set out with them. They are on their way to the home of Baron Waldeck who is celebrating the birth of his first child.

Waldeck's guests also include the Count and Oberto, who is still desperate for the loss of Edmea. Oberto wanders gloomily around the palace without participating in the general joy. When the jesters arrive at the palace, Oberto immediately recognizes among them the voice of Edmea, who, upon seeing him, to the amazement of all, finds reason again. Oberto, casting a defiant glance at his father, escapes with Edmea. Ulmo is left in despair for having saved the young woman just to return her to his rival.

=== Act III ===
Oberto has brought Edmea back to his home, but he is unaware of the marriage to Ulmo. Edmea reveals to him that she is married to Ulmo, near the tomb of Oberto's mother. The two plan to flee when Ulmo, very pale, arrives.

Oberto threatens him with a dagger, but Ulmo reveals that he has decided to kill himself to eliminate any obstacle to the union between Oberto and Edmea. Reassuring Oberto that Edmea is still a virgin, Ulmo asks, as his only reward, to receive a kiss on the forehead from Edmea when he is dead. He is certain that he will feel it in his heart. Oberto calms down and agrees. Ulmo dies.

The Count arrives, bringing to Oberto the news that he has obtained the dissolution of the marriage. Oberto shows his father the corpse of Ulmo, and while Edmea fulfills the last wish of the deceased, he asks everyone to prostrate themselves, as if at the altar of a saint.

== Recording ==
María Sokolinska, Graziano del Vivo, Maurizio Frusoni, Angelo Nosotti, Marco Chingari, Pierre Lefebvre, Orchestra Lirico-Sinfonica del Teatro del Giglio di Lucca, Massimo de Bernart
