= Michael Zeno Diemer =

German painter (1867–1939)

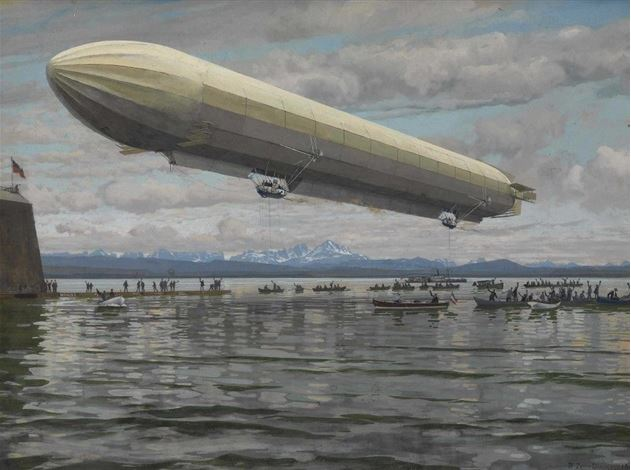
Zeppelin Taking Off Over Lake Constance, 1909

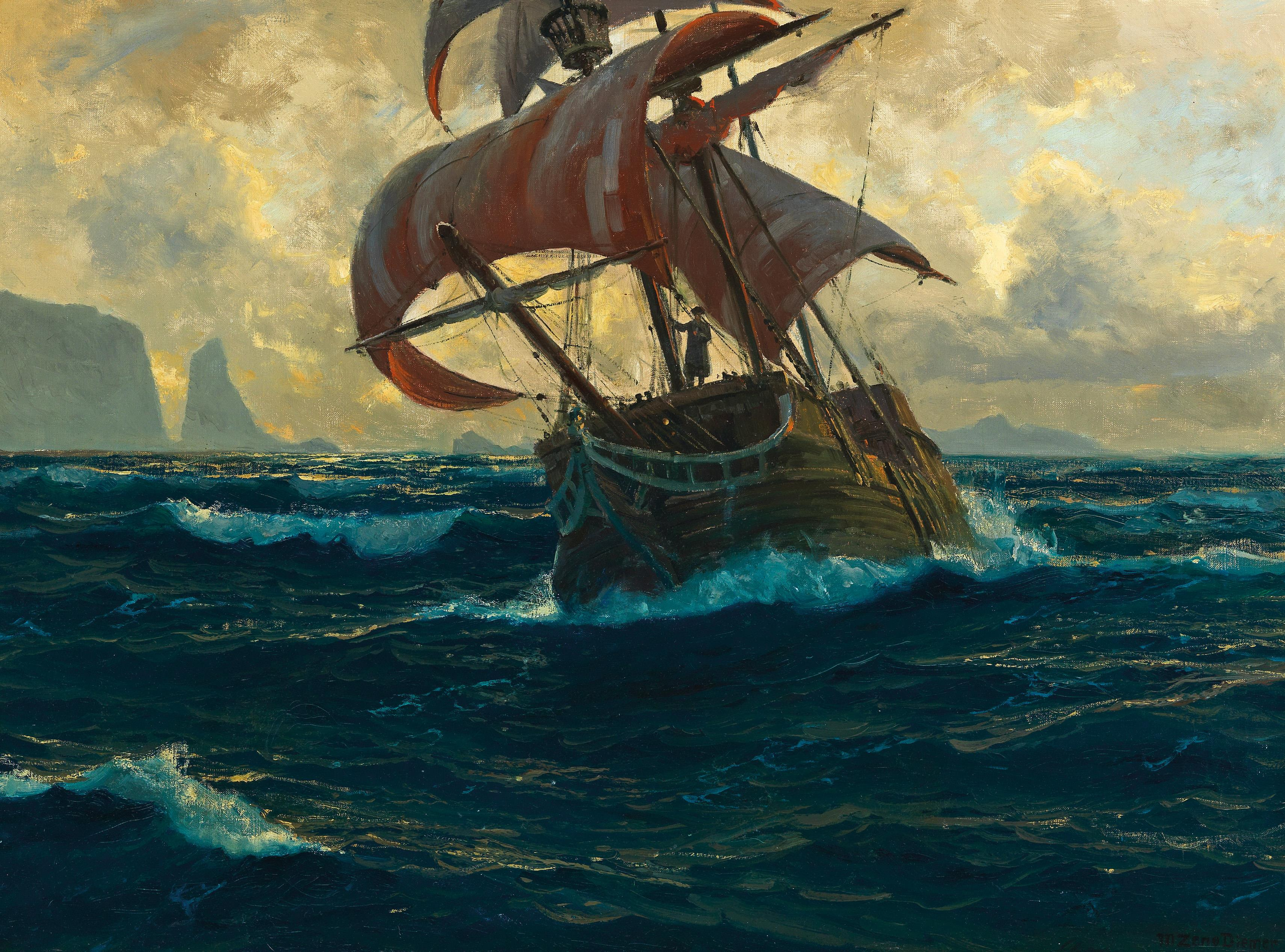
The Flying Dutchman

Michael Zeno Diemer (1867–1939) was a German painter. Now known primarily for his marine paintings and postcard designs, he was initially famous for his panoramic paintings of battles.

== Life and work ==
Diemer was born on 8 February 1867 in Munich which was then part of the Kingdom of Bavaria.

In 1884, he enrolled at the Academy of Fine Arts, Munich, where he studied with Gabriel Hackl and Alexander von Liezen-Mayer.

His fame initially derived from his impressive battle paintings. In 1894, over the course of six months, he worked in Innsbruck, where he created a 1000 square meter (10,800 square feet) panoramic painting depicting the Battles of Bergisel (1809), in which forces led by Andreas Hofer defeated the armies of Napoleon and the Kingdom of Bavaria. It is currently on display at the Innsbrucker Riesenrundgemälde; one of only thirty surviving panoramas from that period.

Another panorama from 1896 depicted the Battle of Bazeilles from the Franco-Prussian War. It was displayed at a specially constructed building in Mannheim and is now lost. He created several works for the Deutsches Museum in Munich; including a Roman aqueduct for the hydraulic engineering display, a Medieval herb garden and the flight of a zeppelin (1909). In Stuttgart, for the "Ketterer", a restaurant at a brewery, he produced a series of fourteen large paintings on the history of Swabian emigration.

As a watercolorist, he produced numerous landscape paintings and maritime scenes, poster designs, and postcard motifs. He also worked as a musician and a composer.

His wife, Hermine, was the eldest daughter of the actress and writer, Wilhelmine von Hillern. Their son, Franz-Zeno Diemer, was a pioneering test pilot and flight engineer.

He died on 28 February 1939 in Oberammergau.
