= Josef Alois Knittel =

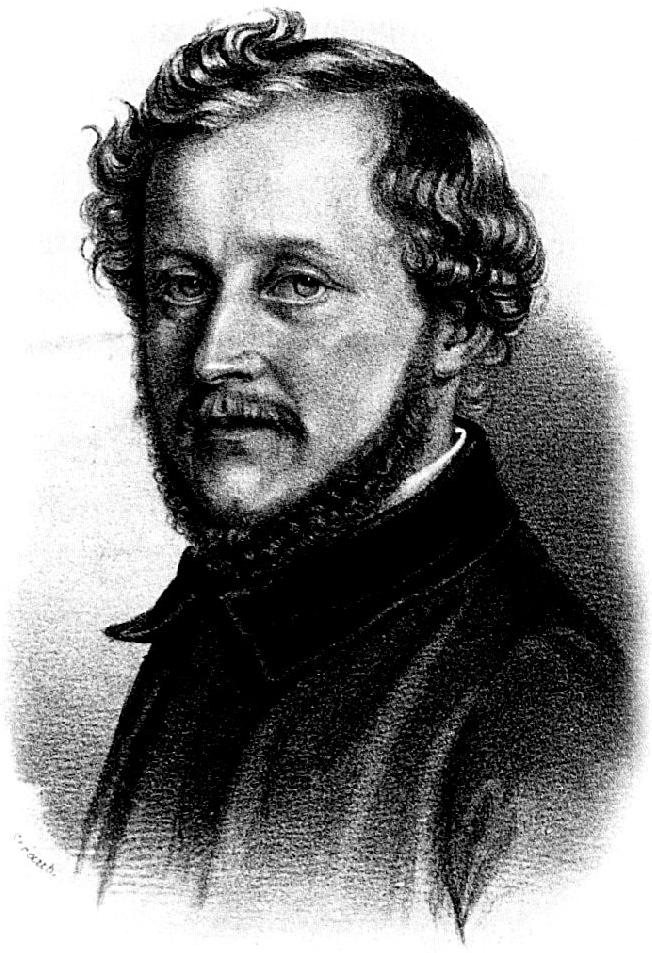
- Lithograph by Andreas Straub (c.1859)
- Born: 20 April 1814; Oberbach
- Died: 23 December 1875; Freiburg im Breisgau
- Occupation: Sculptor

Josef Alois Knittel (20 April 1814, Oberbach – 23 December 1875, Freiburg im Breisgau) was an Austrian-born German sculptor. On his mother's side, he was a nephew of the painter, Joseph Anton Koch; on his father's side, an uncle of Anna Stainer-Knittel. His sons, Gustav Adolf and Berthold Knittel also became sculptors.

== Biography ==
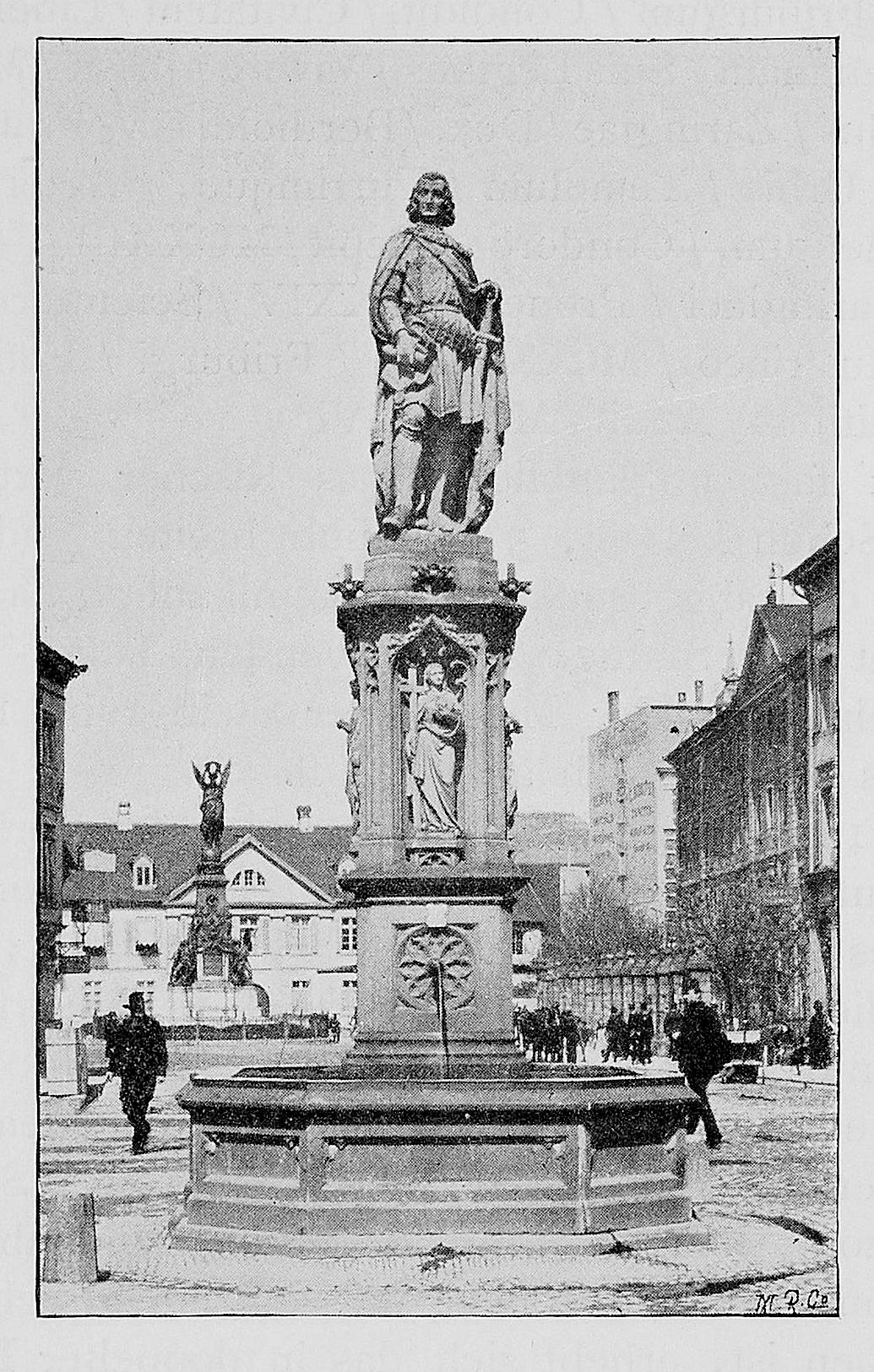
Grand Duke Albert VI

His father was a master tailor. He displayed an early talent for art, which prompted his drawing teacher, Anton Falger, to suggest that he be sent to Munich for further studies. In 1835, he enrolled at the Academy of Fine Arts there; becoming a student of Ludwig Schwanthaler and Peter von Cornelius.

He completed his studies in 1838, and settled in Munich. In 1847, he moved to Freiburg, where he would live for the rest of his life. The following year, he married Thekla Geiges (1836-1898); daughter of the District Auditor, Anton Geiges, and sister of the city's Master Builder, Sigmund Geiges. He was godfather to his nephew, Fritz Geiges, who would become a glass painter.

In 1850, the sculptor Joseph von Kopf, studied with him and Wilhelm Dürr, before setting off on foot to Rome in 1852. Kopf would later create works from Knittel's original models. His niece, Anna, came to him in 1867, seeking his support for her proposed marriage, which her father was trying to prevent.

He was awarded a major commission by Mayor Carl Röttinger to create four statues, depicting the seasons, for the grounds of the Freiburg railway station. He had barely completed the preliminary sketches when he died of heart failure. His widow and two sons continued to operate his studio for many years.

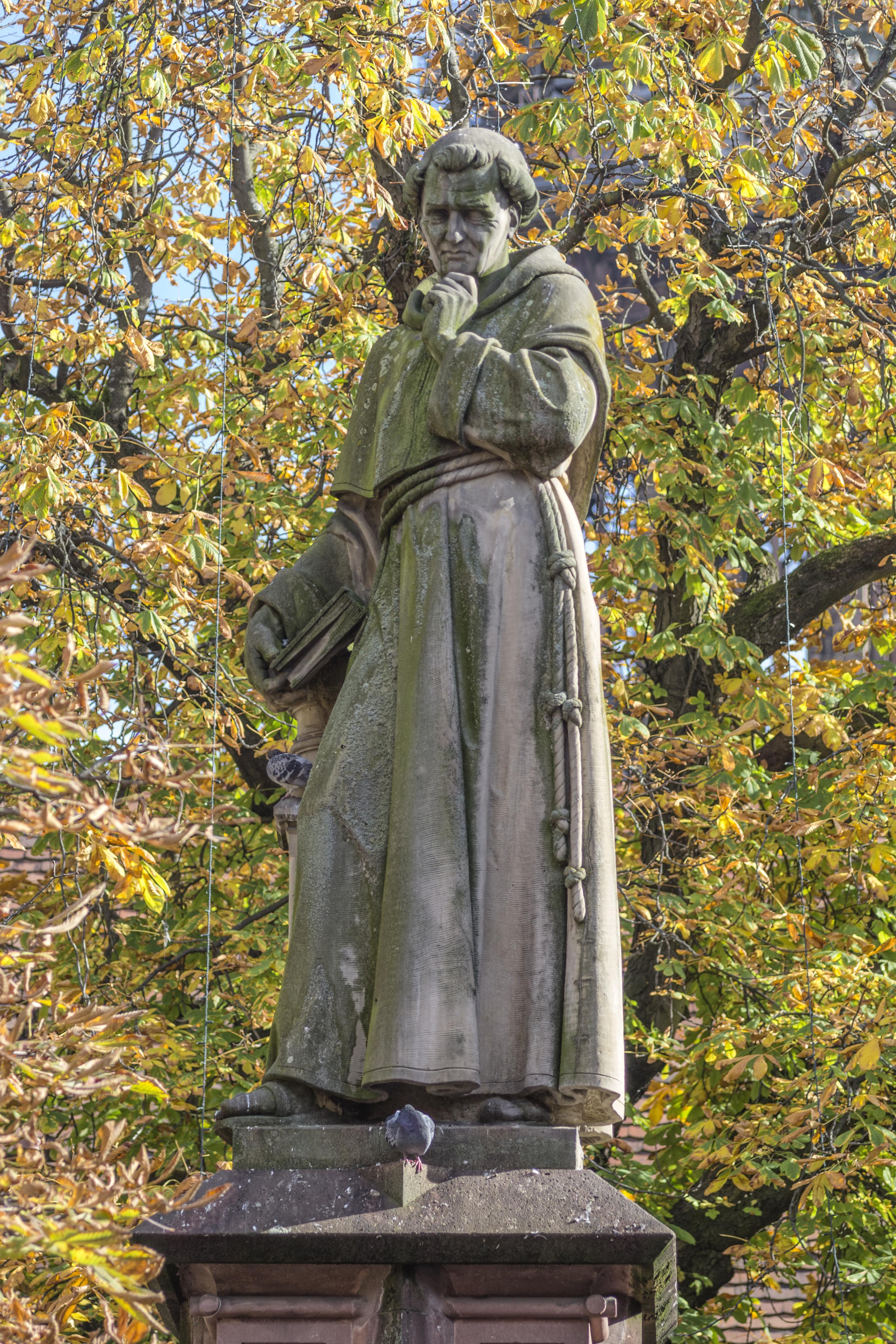
Berthold Schwarz

Most of his work was done in sandstone. His best known work is the monument to Berthold Schwarz, the alchemist credited with inventing gunpowder, on the Freiburg town square. Several works, including a large statue of Albert VI, Archduke of Austria, were destroyed during World War II. Statues representing Theory and Technology, on the old Realschule, were demolished during construction of the University Library in 1978, as they had been damaged during the war.
