= Charlotte Birch-Pfeiffer =

German actress and writer (1800–1868)

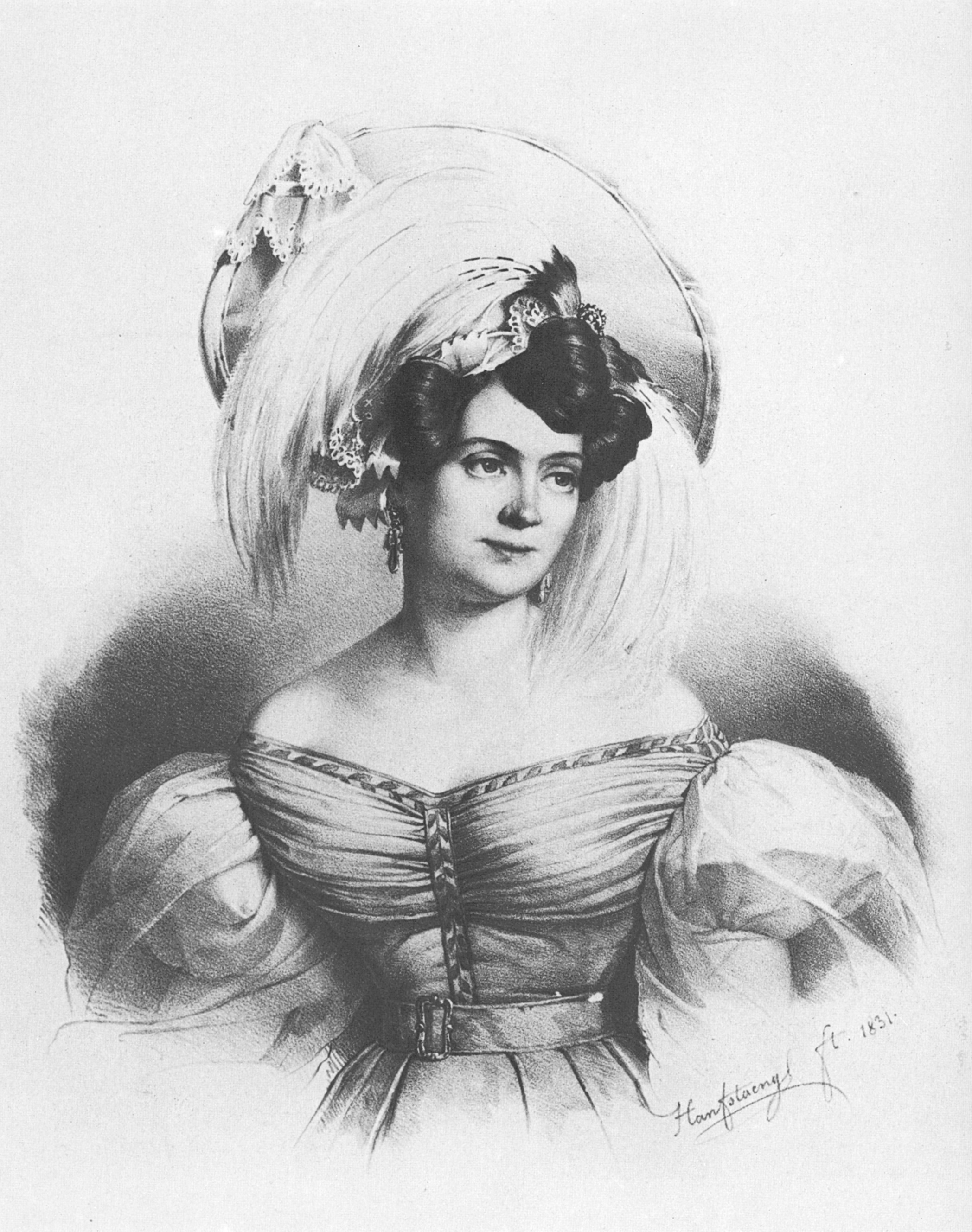
- lithograph by Franz Hanfstängl
- Born: Charlotte Karoline Pfeiffer; 23 June 1800; Stuttgart, Duchy of Württemberg, Holy Roman Empire
- Died: 25 August 1868 (aged 68); Berlin, Kingdom of Prussia
- Occupations: Actress, writer
- Writing career
- Language: German
- Genre: Theatre

Charlotte Johanna Birch-Pfeiffer (23 June 1800 in Stuttgart – 25 August 1868 in Berlin) was a German actress, writer, director of the Stadttheater in Zürich for six years, and author of over 100 plays and librettos.

== Biography ==
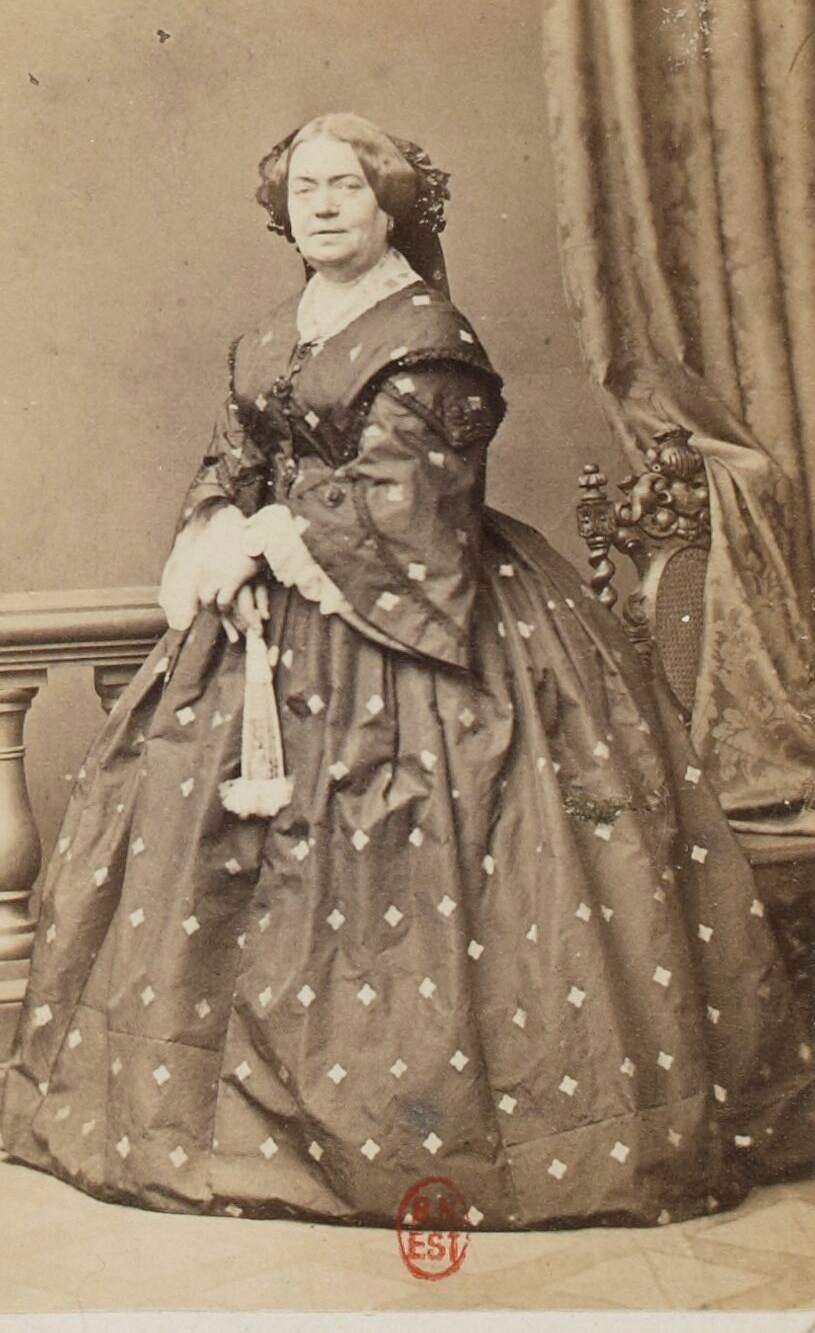
Carte-de-visite

Charlotte Johanna's father diplomat, Bavarian Councillor of War, Ferdinand Friedrich Pfeiffer (1759–1833) was a schoolmate of Schiller at Karlschule, supposedly her father was responsible for saving the manuscript Die Räuber by hiding it in his mattress. When he went blind in 1809, Birch-Pfeiffer read him the classics and by doing so gained a strong literary education. Both father and daughter loved the theater.

In 1813 Birch-Pfeiffer's stage debut, trained by Hofschauspieler F. A. Zuccarini, at the Munich Court Theater, Isarthortheater was supported by the Bavarian King, Max Joseph. From 1818 to 1826 she appeared in Prague, Stuttgart, Kassel, Hannover, Berlin, Dresden, and Hamburg as a member of the München Hoftheater playing the lead in tragic roles. In 1825 she married Danish writer and historian, Christian Andreas Birch (1795–1868), the couple begat six children.

From 1827 to 1839 Charlotte acted at the Theater an der Wien. From 1837–1842 she worked as the director of the Stadttheater in Zürich. After professionally visiting most of the cities in Germany, in 1844 she accepted an engagement at the royal Berlin Hoftheater, to which she remained attached until her death. Her only surviving child, daughter Wilhelmine von Hillern, also became an actress and writer.

=== Lasting influence ===
On 29 May 2012 Birch-Pfeiffer was honored as the first director of the Zürich theater, where an honorary board was placed for her. On 24 February 2013 at the Theater Stok in Zürich Charlotte Birch-Pfeiffer the play was performed about Birch-Pfeiffer's life.

== Works ==
=== Publications ===
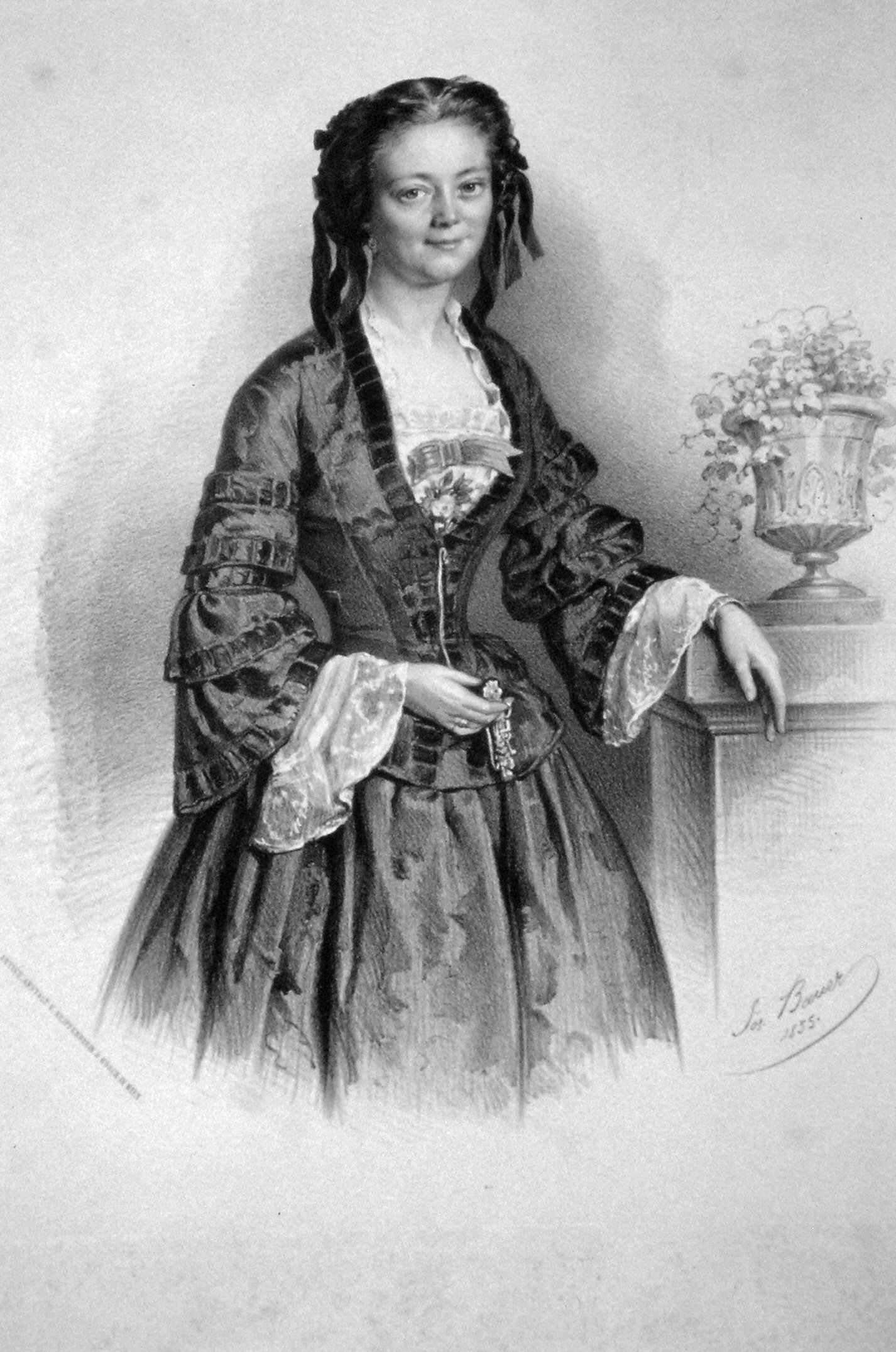
Charlotte Birch Pfeiffer, Joseph Anton Bauer, 1855

Charlotte Johanna Birch-Pfeiffer's publications as cited by An Encyclopedia of Continental Women Writers.

- Gesammelte Dramatische Werke, 23 Volumes (1863–1880), or the 74 plays collected in these volumes, only two have been translated to English. Twixt Axe & Crown [Elizabeth, Prinzessin von England] (1870) and Jane Eyre, or the Orphan of Lowood (1870)
- Gesammelte Novellen und Erzäwungen, 3 volumes (1863–1865)
- Charlotte von Birch-Pfeiffer und Heinrich Laube Im Briefwechsel (1917)
- Alexander von Weilen (1917)

=== Her plays ===
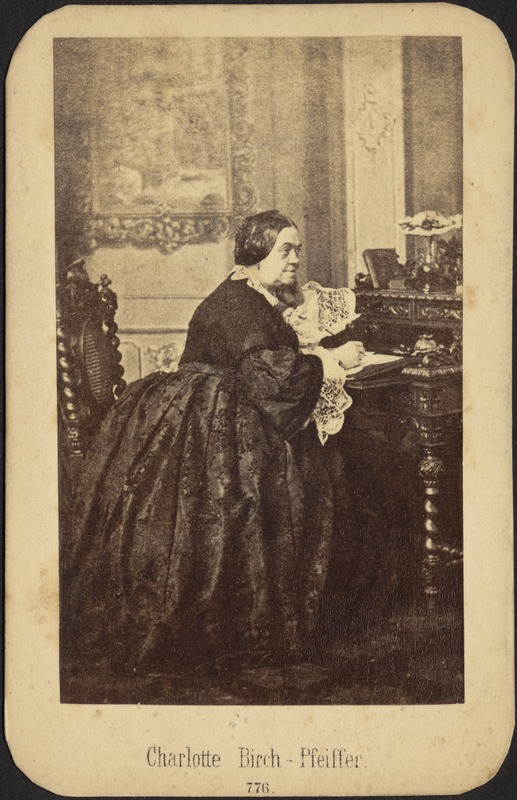
Charlotte Birch-Pfeiffer, [ca. 1859–1870]. Carte de Visite Collection, Boston Public Library

Dramatization of popular novels was her specialty, for which her intimate knowledge of the technical necessities of the stage fitted her. Her plays, adapted and original, fill 23 volumes (Gesammelte dramatische Werke; Leipzig, 1863–1880). Many continued to retain the public favor. Her novels and tales were collected in three volumes (Gesammelte Novellen und Erzählungen; Leipzig, 1863–1865). Among her plays are:

- Dorf und Stadt (after Berthold Auerbach)
- Die Frau in Weiss (after Wilkie Collins)
- Der Glöckner von Notre Dame (after Victor Hugo)
- Der Goldbauer
- Die Grille (after George Sand)
- Die Günstlinge
- Der Herr Studiosus
- Hinko
- Kind des Glücks
- Steffen Langer aus Glogau oder Der holländische Kamin
- Der Leiermann und sein Pflegekind
- Mutter und Sohn
- Nacht und Morgen (after Edward Bulwer-Lytton)
- Pfefferrösel
- Die Waise aus Lowood (after Charlotte Brontë's Jane Eyre)

== Notes ==
Attribution

- Gilman, D. C.; Peck, H. T.; Colby, F. M., eds. (1905). "Birch-Pfeiffer, Charlotte" . New International Encyclopedia (1st ed.). New York: Dodd, Mead.
