= Feldhaus =

Feldhaus is a surname. Although the exact origins of the Feldhaus name are not known for certain, there are several theories about its possible history. One theory suggests that the name might be derived from a German word meaning "field house" or "farmhouse". Alternatively, it could be named after a place called Feldhausen in Germany. Another possibility is that it comes from a Jewish surname meaning "field" or "farm".

Whatever its specific origins may be, the Feldhaus name has been associated with some notable individuals throughout history. For example, Field Marshal August Neidhardt von Gneisenau was a prominent Prussian military leader who served during the Napoleonic Wars and later helped lead the fight against Napoleon's invasion of Russia.

Other notable people with the surname include:

- Anne Feldhaus (born 1949), American professor of Religious Studies
- Deron Feldhaus (born 1968), American basketball player
- Franz Maria Feldhaus (1874–1957), German engineer, historian of science, and scientific writer
