= La Leggenda di Wally =

1930 film

- Directed by: Gian Orlando Vassallo
- Written by: Wilhelmine von Hillern (novel)
- Release date: 1930
- Country: Italy
- Language: Italian

La Leggenda di Wally is a 1930 Italian film, directed by Gian Orlando Vassallo and starring Piero Pastore. It is based on the novel The Vulture Maiden by Wilhelmine von Hillern.

== Cast ==
- Linda Pini as La Wally
- Piero Pastore as Hagenbach
- Laura Nucci
