= La Wally =

1892 opera by Alfredo Catalani

- Opera by Alfredo Catalani
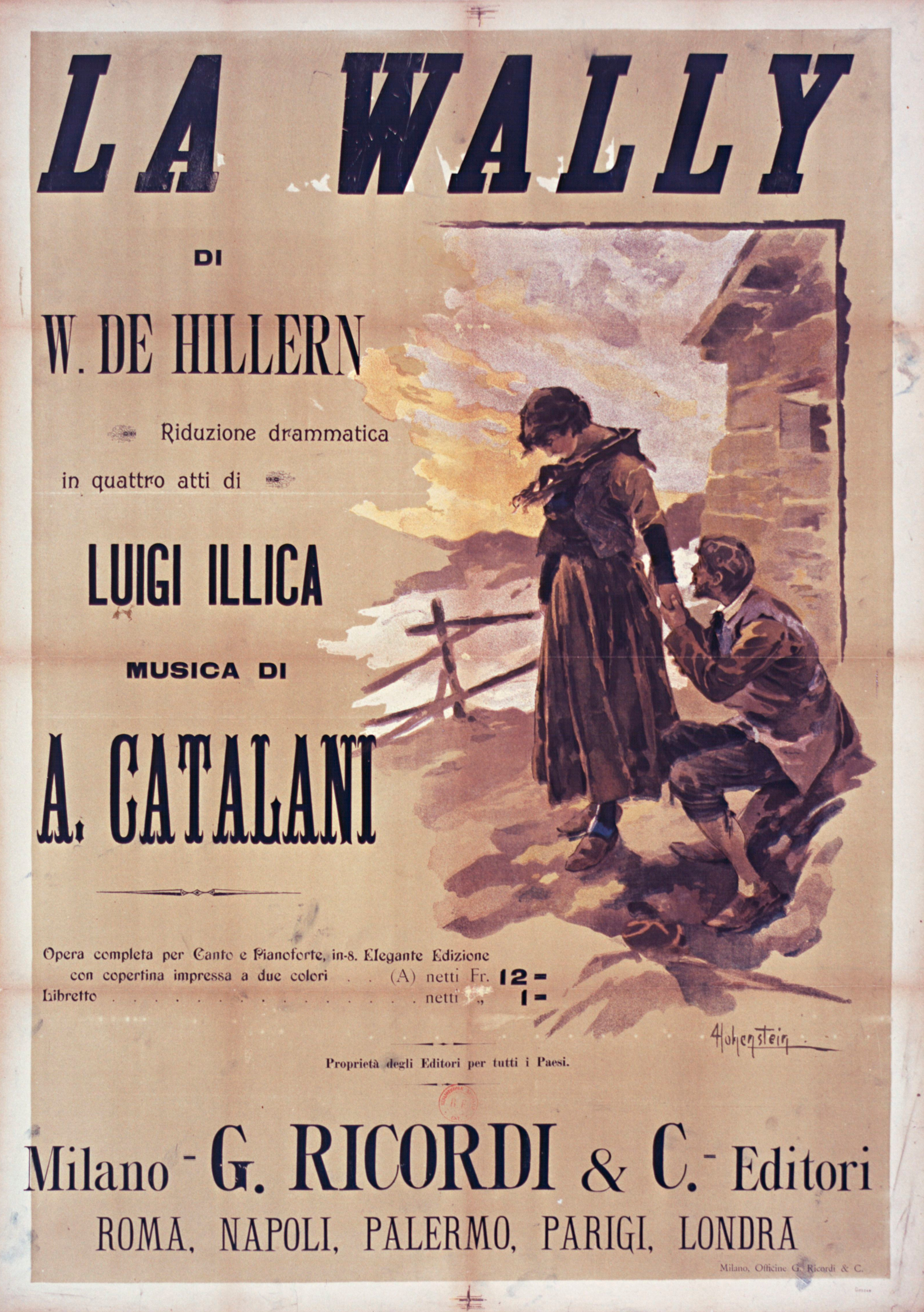
- Cover of the vocal score published by Ricordi
- Librettist: Luigi Illica
- Premiere: 20 January 1892; La Scala, Milan

La Wally is an opera in four acts by composer Alfredo Catalani, to a libretto by Luigi Illica, first performed at La Scala, Milan, on 20 January 1892. It was Catalani's last opera.

The libretto is based on a hugely successful Heimatroman by Wilhelmine von Hillern (1836–1916), The Vulture Maiden (Die Geier-Wally). Wally, short for Walburga, is a girl with some heroic attributes. The story is based on an episode in the life of Tyrolean painter Anna Stainer-Knittel, whom von Hillern met. She got her epithet "Geier" (vulture) from having gutted a bearded vulture's nest going down a rope; this dangerous task, aimed at protecting the sheep in the Alpine village, was typically performed by a man.

Hillern's piece was originally serialized in Deutsche Rundschau and was reproduced in English as "A German Peasant Romance" in the Cornhill Magazine in 1875.

The opera is best known for its aria "Ebben? Ne andrò lontana" ("Well, then? I'll go far away," act 1, sung when Wally decides to leave her home forever). American soprano Wilhelmenia Fernandez sang this aria in Jean-Jacques Beineix's 1981 movie Diva – a performance at the heart of the thriller. Catalani had composed this aria independently as "Chanson Groënlandaise" in 1878 and later incorporated it into his opera.

The opera features a memorable operatic death in which the heroine throws herself into an avalanche. It is seldom performed, partly because of the difficulty of staging this scene, but Wally's principal aria is still sung frequently.

== Roles ==
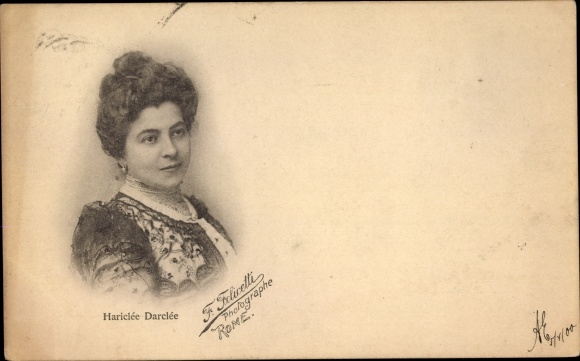
Hariclea Darclée, who created the role of Wally

Roles, voice types, premiere cast
Role	Voice type	Premiere cast, 20 January 1892 Conductor: Edoardo Mascheroni
Wally	soprano	Hariclea Darclée
Stromminger, Wally's father	bass	Ettore Brancoleoni
Afra, innkeeper	mezzo-soprano	Virginia Guerrini
Walter	soprano	Adelina Stehle
Giuseppe Hagenbach, a hunter	tenor	Manuel Suanges
Vincenzo Gellner, Stromminger's estate manager	baritone	Arturo Pessina
Chorus: Tyroleans, shepherds, peasants, hunters, old women, village children.

== Synopsis ==
The story is set in the Austrian Tyrol, where the free-spirited but vulnerable Wally is in love with the handsome Giuseppe Hagenbach. However, her father, Stromminger, wants her to marry Vincenzo Gellner. The opera concludes with Hagenbach and Wally pledging their love for each other but being killed by an avalanche.

=== Act 1 ===
The village of Hochstoff

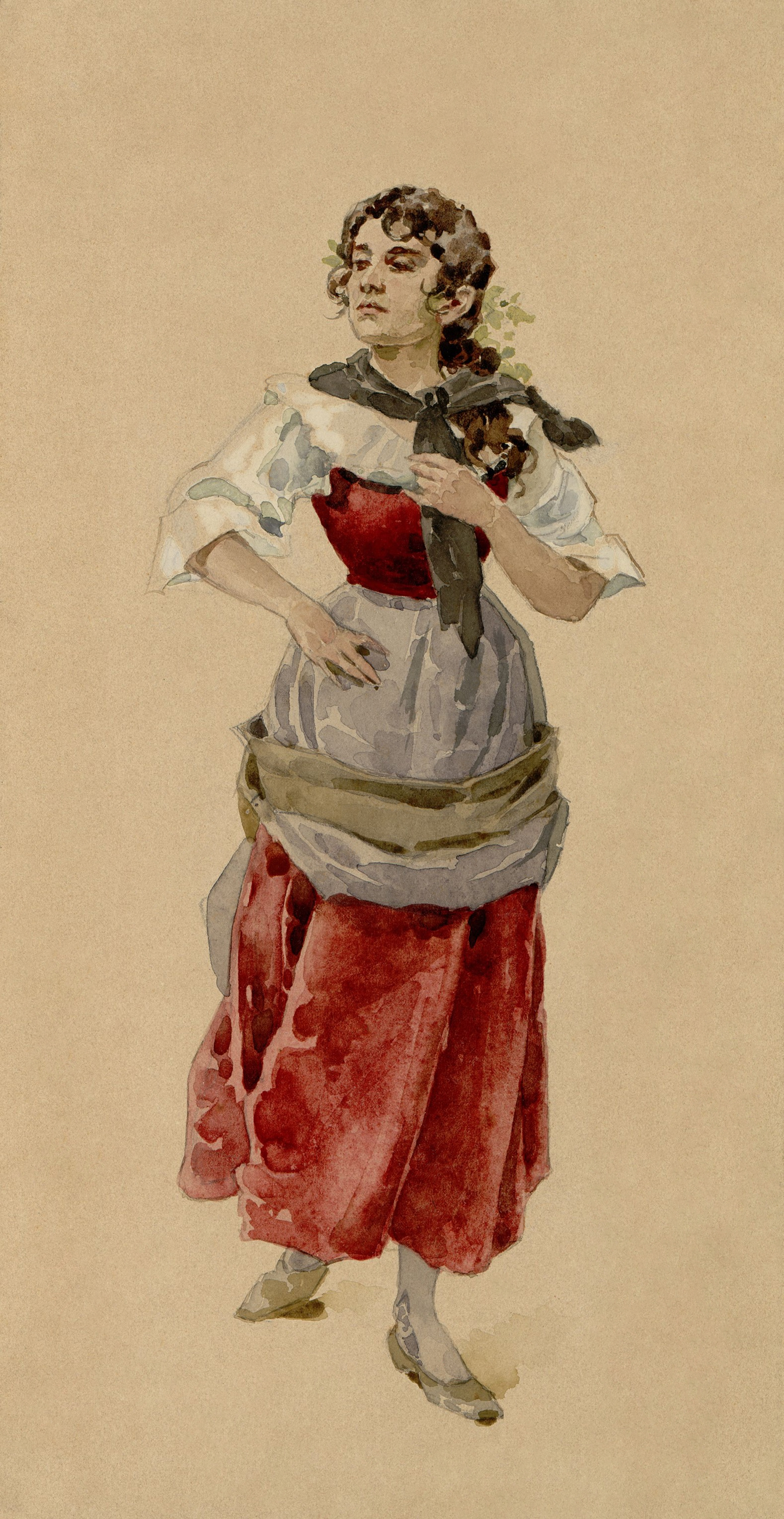
Act 1 costume for Wally by Adolf Hohenstein

A shooting contest is being held to celebrate the 70th birthday of Wally's father, Stromminger. A hunting party arrives from the nearby village of Sölden led by Hagenbach. Old enmities quickly surface, and a quarrel develops between Stromminger and Hagenbach, who trade threats and insults before Hagenbach is drawn away by his companions.

Vincenzo Gellner has his own heart set on Wally and quickly notices that she is clearly infatuated with her father's enemy during the quarrel. When left alone with Stromminger, he tells the older man of his suspicions. Recognising that Gellner is in love with his daughter, he insists that Wally agree to marry him within a month or leave his house forever. Wally retorts that she would rather take her chances in the Alpine snows than marry Gellner.

=== Act 2 ===
The Eagle Tavern at Sölden

A year has passed; Stromminger has died, and Wally has inherited his fortune. However, Hagenbach has become engaged to Afra, the landlady of the Eagle Tavern, and is apparently not interested in Wally.

A festival is taking place in Sölden, and Wally is drawn to the tavern knowing Hagenbach will be there. Hagenbach is persuaded to accept a challenge to try to win a kiss from Wally. What begins as a game quickly develops into something more serious, and Hagenbach easily wins his wager. When Wally realises she has been the victim of a cynical bet, her jealousy and fury boil over. She turns to Gellner, who is also at the festival, and insists that if he loves her, he must kill Hagenbach.

=== Act 3 ===
A ravine

La Wally returns to her home. Her anger has now subsided, and she wishes she could take back her words. At that moment, there is a knock at her door. It is Gellner, who describes how, under cover of darkness, he was able to set upon Hagenbach and hurl him into a deep ravine.

Wally is horrified and hurries to the ravine in the hope of saving Hagenbach, even though she believes he loves Afra. She herself goes down a rope to rescue him and successfully raises his unconscious body back to the surface.

=== Act 4 ===
High in the Alps

Lonely and depressed, Wally has climbed into the mountains above the village. Her only friend, Walter, has followed and urges her to come down for the Christmas festivities, reminding her of the dangers of avalanches. She sends him away and contemplates her imminent death.

Wally hears another voice. It is Hagenbach, who has recovered from his injuries and come to confess his love. The lovers are reconciled, and Hagenbach goes to find a safe path back down the mountain. He shouts up to Wally, but the noise of his call sets off an avalanche that carries him away. Wally stands momentarily on the edge of the precipice before hurling herself down to her death.

== Recordings ==
- 1960: Renata Tebaldi, Giacinto Prandelli, Silvio Majonica, Pinuccia Perotti, conducted by Arturo Basile (CD, Hommage GmbH Musikproduktion und Verlag)
- 1968: Renata Tebaldi, Mario Del Monaco, Piero Cappuccilli, Justino Díaz, conducted by Fausto Cleva (CD, Decca)
- 1972: Magda Olivero, Nicola Zaccaria, Laura Zanini, Ida Farina, Amadeo Zambon, Silvano Carroli, Giovanni Foiani, conducted by Ferruccio Scaglia Orchestra and Chorus Teatro Donizetti, Bergamo, Italy, 1972 (CD, Opera D'Oro, 2006)
- 1989: Éva Marton, Francisco Araiza, Alan Titus, Francesco Ellero d'Artegna, conducted by Pinchas Steinberg (CD, Eurodisc)
- 2014: Susanna von der Burg, Paulo Ferreira, Marc Kugel, Bernd Valentin, Susanne Langbein, Chor des Tiroler Landestheater Innsbruck, Tiroler Symphonieorchester Innsbruck, conducted by Alexander Rumpf (DVD Video, Capriccio, C95000)

== Film ==
- La Wally (dir. Guido Brignone, 1932)
- Diva (dir. Jean-Jacques Beineix, 1981) prominently features the aria "Ebben? Ne andrò lontana", performed by Wilhelmenia Wiggins Fernandez.
- A Single Man (dir. Tom Ford, 2009) features "Ebben? Ne andrò lontana", performed by soprano Miriam Gauci.
