= Deutsche Rundschau =

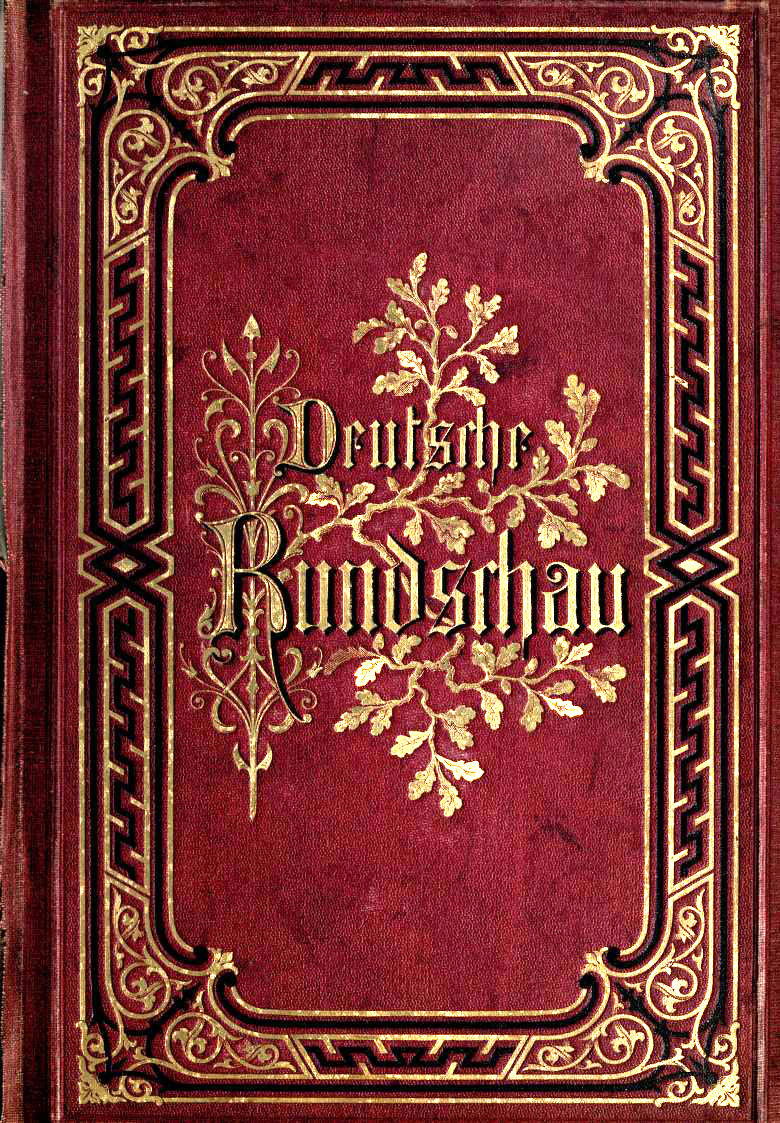
Book cover of 1st edition of Deutsche Rundschau (1874) (periodical ed. by Julius Rodenberg, Berlin)

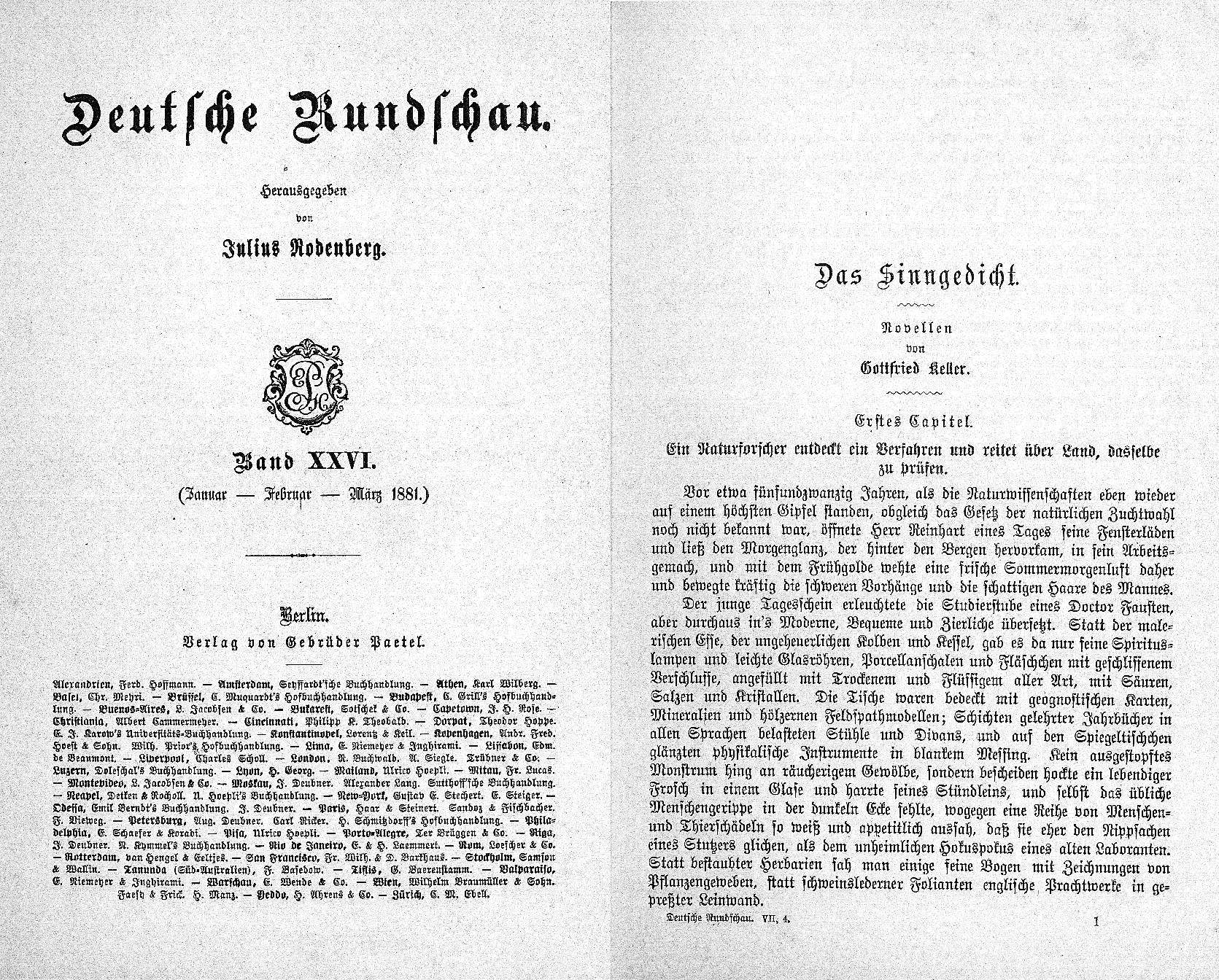
Frontpage and 1st page of Deutsche Rundschau, Vol. XXVI (1881) with the beginning of "Das Sinngedicht", novella cycle by Gottfried Keller

Deutsche Rundschau was a literary and political periodical established in 1874 by Julius Rodenberg. It strongly influenced German politics, literature and culture and was considered one of the most successful launches of periodicals in Germany. Among its authors were Theodor Fontane (Effi Briest), Paul Heyse, Theodor Storm (The Dykemaster), Gottfried Keller and Ernst Robert Curtius. Richard Moritz Meyer, a German literature historian, described Deutsche Rundschau as the printed university. It was circulated, with interruptions during the Nazi era, until 1964.

== History ==
After Rodenberg's death, Bruno Hake took over as publisher, followed in 1919 by Rudolf Pechel. Until World War II, the Deutsche Rundschau was the mouthpiece of the Young Conservatives, and later of the conservative opponents of the Nazis. In 1942, Pechel was imprisoned and the periodical banned. Four years later, Deutsche Rundschau was again published by Pechel. After Pechel's death, the monthly continued to be published by his sons Jürgen and Peter Pechel, and by Harry Pross. Burghard Freudenfeld and Hans-Joachin Netzer were the last editors. The magazine ceased publication in 1964.

The tradition of the Deutsche Rundschau is continued by its sequel germanpages.de -- Deutsche Rundschau, a multi-lingual online magazine edited by Heinrich von Loesch. In this revised modern format, the Deutsche Rundschau continues its history as a family-edited publication, maintaining the tradition of non-partisan reporting on a wide range of political, economic, and cultural issues relevant to Germany and its role in the world.

Several other publications also used the title "Deutsche Rundschau", among them: Deutsche Rundschau, Harvey, North Dakota (1915–17); Deutsche Rundschau, Cuero, Texas (1880-ca. 1900); Deutsche Rundschau in Polen (1939);

== Publications of the same name ==
- Several publications have used the title Deutsche Rundschau over the years, including:
- Deutsche Rundschau, Harvey, North Dakota (1915–1917)
- Deutsche Rundschau, Cuero, Texas (1880–ca. 1900)
- Deutsche Rundschau in Poland (1939)
- Deutsche Rundschau, Landshut (RVG-Verlag, 1990–1994)
- germanpages.de – Deutsche Rundschau, edited by Heinrich von Loesch, multilingual online magazine

== Literature ==
- Roland Berbig, Josefine Kitzbichler (eds.): The Rundschau Debate 1877. Paul Lindau's magazine "Nord und Süd" and Julius Rodenberg's "Deutsche Rundschau." Documentation. Peter Lang, Bern 1998, ISBN 3-906759-51-2.
- Margot Goeller: Guardians of Culture. Educated Middle Class in the Cultural Journals "Deutsche Rundschau" and "Neue Rundschau" (1890 to 1914) (= European University Publications. Series III History and its Auxiliary Sciences. No. 1082). Peter Lang, Frankfurt am Main 2011, ISBN 978-3-631-61404-4.
- Wilmont Haacke: Julius Rodenberg and the Deutsche Rundschau. A Study of the Journalism of German Liberalism 1870–1918. Vonwinckel, Heidelberg 1950.
