= The Vulture Wally (1921 film) =

1921 film directed by Ewald André Dupont

- Scene from a film
- German: Die Geierwally
- Directed by: Ewald André Dupont
- Written by: Wilhelmine von Hillern (novel); Ewald André Dupont
- Produced by: Hanns Lippmann; Henny Porten
- Starring: Albert Steinrück; Henny Porten; William Dieterle; Eugen Klöpfer
- Cinematography: Karl Hasselmann; Arpad Viragh
- Music by: Giuseppe Becce; Bruno Schulz
- Production company: Gloria-Film
- Distributed by: UFA
- Release date: 12 September 1921
- Country: Germany
- Languages: Silent; German intertitles

The Vulture Wally (German: Die Geierwally) is a 1921 German silent drama film directed by Ewald André Dupont and starring Albert Steinrück, Henny Porten and William Dieterle. The film is a bergfilm based on the novel The Vulture Maiden by Wilhelmine von Hillern. It is a melodrama set in the Alps, and was one of Dupont's most successful films of the early 1920s.

== Cast ==
- Albert Steinrück as Stromminger
- Henny Porten as Wally
- William Dieterle as Der Bären-Joseph
- Eugen Klöpfer as Der Gellner-Vincenz
- Elise Zachow-Vallentin as Luckard
- Marie Grimm-Einödshofer as Die Obermagd
- Julius Brandt as Klettenmeyer
- Wilhelm Diegelmann as Roferbauer sen.
- Gerd Fricke as Roferbauer jun.
- Grete Diercks as Afra
