= Wilhelmine von Hillern =

German actress and novelist

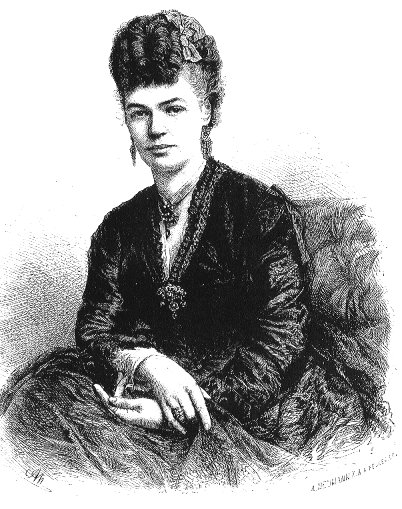

Signature
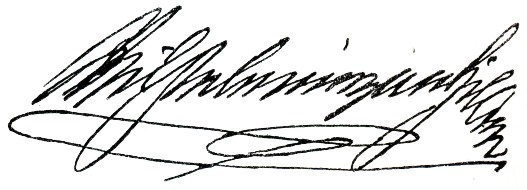

Wilhelmine von Hillern (11 March 1836 Munich – 15 December 1916 Hohenaschau) was a German actress and novelist.

== Biography ==
She was the daughter of the novelist Charlotte Birch-Pfeiffer. She was brought up in Berlin, became an actress at Gotha (1854), and married the prominent jurist von Hillern at Freiburg im Breisgau in 1857. Her husband died 8 December 1882. After that, she lived chiefly at Oberammergau and Tutzing.

Her principal novels and short stories were produced during the 1860s and 1870s. One of them, Höher als die Kirche (Higher Than the Church; a tale of Freiburg im Breisgau in Reformation days, 1877) was quite well known in America by reason of the fact that it was frequently read as a text by students of elementary German. It is a comparatively insignificant work, however, by no means so important as the novels, Ein Arzt der Seele (A Doctor for the Soul; a satire of bluestockings, Berlin 1869), Die Geier-Wally (The Vulture Maiden, Berlin 1875), Und sie kommt doch (The Hour Will Come, Berlin 1879), and Ein Blick ins Weite (Black Forest sketches, 1897). One of her novels, Only a Girl, was translated into English by Annis Lee Wister in 1870.

Von Hillern's Die Geyer-Wally became the subject for the Italian composer Alfredo Catalani's last and most successful opera.

The memoirs and biographies of Sabine Baring-Gould contain firsthand descriptions of von Hillern.
