= Milčinski =

Milčinski is a surname. Notable people with the surname include:

- Fran Milčinski (1867–1932), Slovenian lawyer, writer and playwright
- Frane Milčinski (1914–1988), Slovenian poet, satirist, humorist, comedian, actor, writer and director
- Jana Milčinski (1920–2007), Slovenian writer, journalist and translator
- Juš Milčinski, Slovenian actor
