= Kekec =

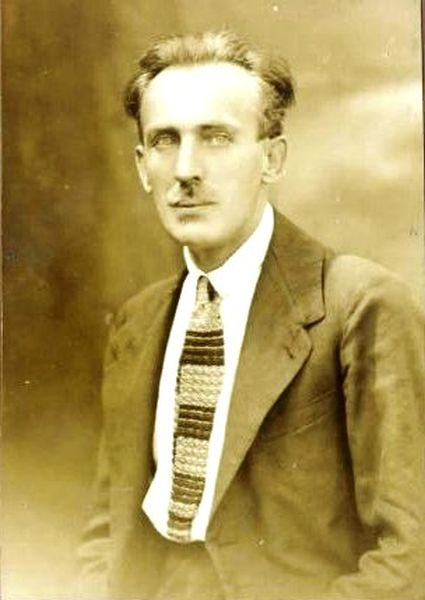
- Josip Vandot (creator of Kekec)
- First appearance: Zvonček (y.19#1/2); 1 January 1918; Kekec na hudi poti (Kekec on the Hard Path)
- Created by: Josip Vandot
- Portrayed by: Matija Barl (1951); Velimir Gjurin (1963); Zlatko Krasnič (1968)

In-universe information
- Alias: Mežnarčev Gregec
- Gender: male
- Occupation: fearless boy and a mountain shepherd fighting Bedanec and Pehta
- Family: Mežnar
- Nationality: Slovenian

Kekec is a fictional children's literature character created by Slovenian author Josip Vandot in 1918. He was first introduced in the serial "Kekec on the Hard Path" (Slovene: Kekec na hudi poti) in Zvonček magazine (volume 19, issue 1/2). He is a young shepherd boy living in the Julian Alps, revered in Slovenia, and the subject of several films.

== List of characters featured in the Kekec novels ==
- Kekec (Mežnarčev Gregec) is widely recognized as a Slovenian superhero and cultural icon. Kekec is a brave boy, a fearless shepherd from the highlands of his home region, Kranjska Gora and Julian Alps. He is good guy who is fighting an evil wild hunter from the mountains (Bedanec) and evil herbalist woman from mountains who is stealing children (Pehta).
- Bedanec (or. Bedanc) - evil poacher with long beard from the mountains.
- Mojca - sister of Rožle, captured by Bedanec and Pehta.
- Pehta - wild woman from the mountains.
- Rožle - scared boy, a friend of Kekec.
- Kosobrin - tiny old herbalist.
- Tinkara
- Brincelj
- Vitranc
- Tinka

== Vandot's original novels ==
The original trilogy of short novels with Kekec as the main character were published as annexes in the monthly Zvonček youth magazine. Each novel was serialised across 12 editions of Zvonček :

#	Title	Issue date in twelve parts	Author	Publisher	Pages	Note
1	"Kekec on the Hard Path" (Kekec na hudi poti)	1 January – 1 December 1918	Josip Vandot	Zvonček (youth publication)	86	in January and July two parts were published, none in February and June
2	"Kekec on the Wolf Trail" (Kekec na volčji sledi)	1 January – 1 December 1922	Josip Vandot	Zvonček (youth publication)	117	in July two parts were published; none in August
3	"Kekec Above the Lonely Abyss" (Kekec nad samotnim breznom)	1 January – 1 December 1924	Josip Vandot	Zvonček (youth publication)	123	novel was published on every first in the month

=== Kekec on the Hard Path ===
Part	Issue date	Pages
I II	1 January 1918	7; 8
III	1 March 1918	8
IV	1 April 1918	8
V	1 May 1918	6
VI; VII	1 July 1918	7; 7
VIII	1 August 1918	6
IX	1 September 1918	6
X	1 October 1918	9
XI	1 November 1918	7
XII	1 December 1918	7

=== Kekec on the Wolf Trail ===
Part	Issue date	Pages
I	1 January 1922	10
II	1 February 1922	10
III	1 March 1922	10
IV	1 April 1922	10
V	1 May 1922	10
VI	1 June 1922	10
VII; VIII	1 July 1922	10; 11
IX	1 September 1922	10
X	1 October 1922	6
XI	1 November 1922	10
XII	1 December 1922	10

=== Kekec Above the Lonely Abyss ===
Part	Issue date	Pages
I	1 January 1924	12
II	1 February 1924	11
III	1 March 1924	9
IV	1 April 1924	10
V	1 May 1924	10
VI	1 June 1924	10
VII	1 July 1924	9
VIII	1 August 1924	10
IX	1 September 1924	10
X	1 October 1924	9
XI	1 November 1924	10
XII	1 December 1924	13

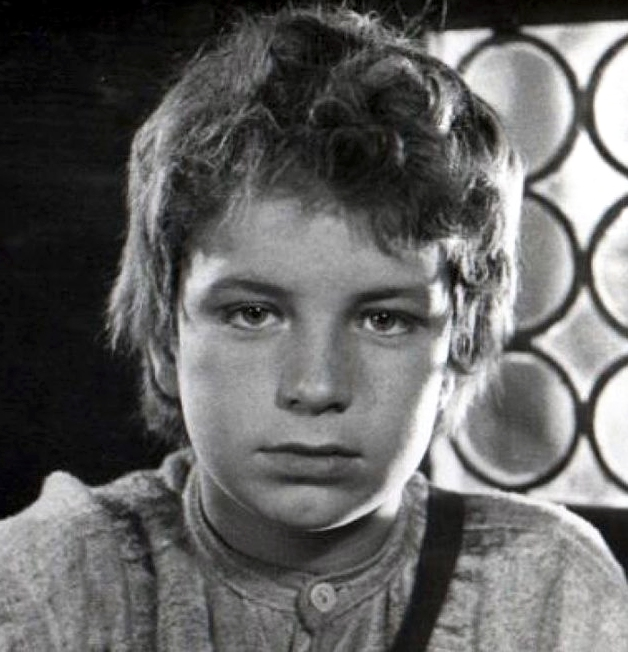
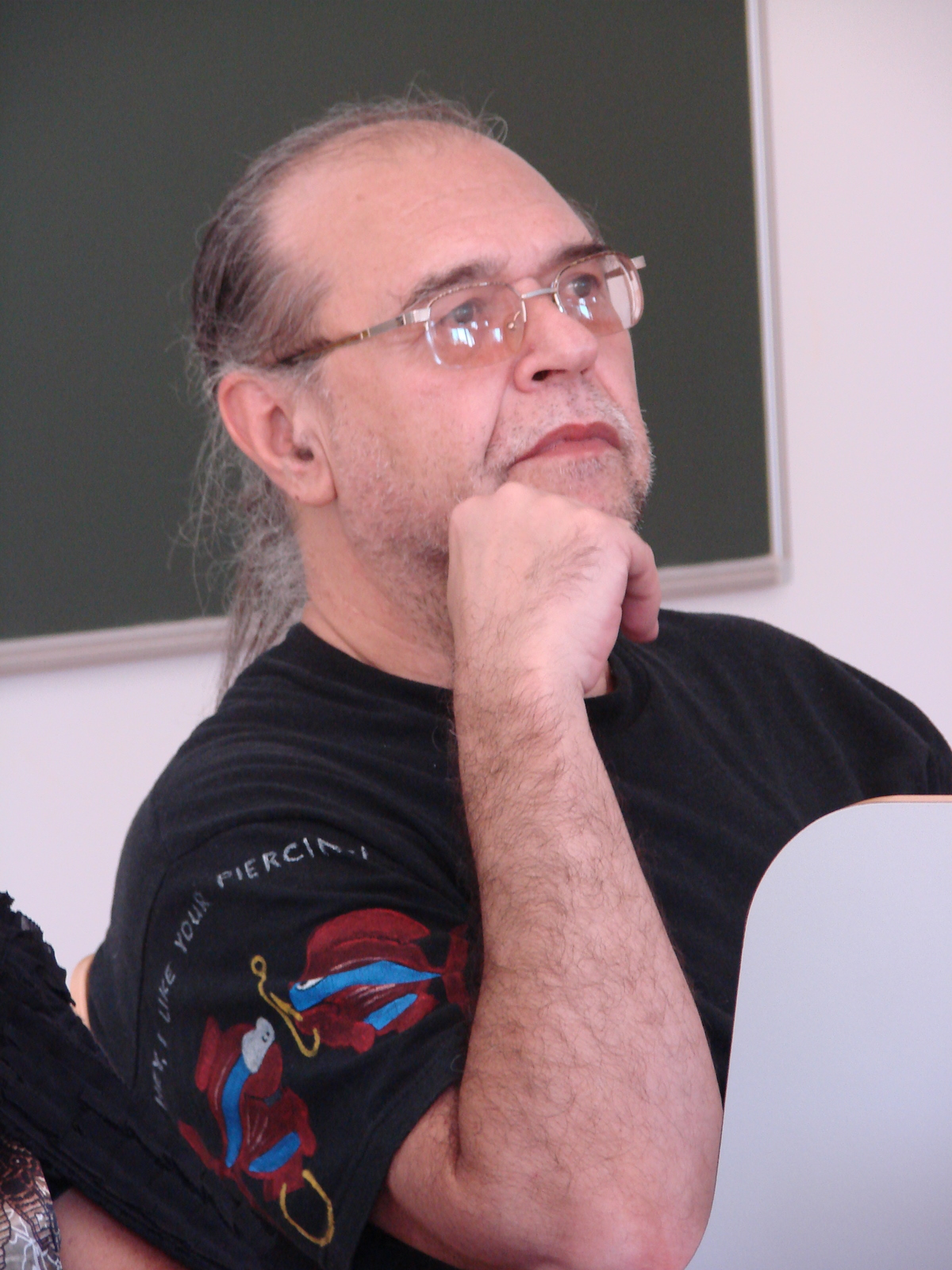
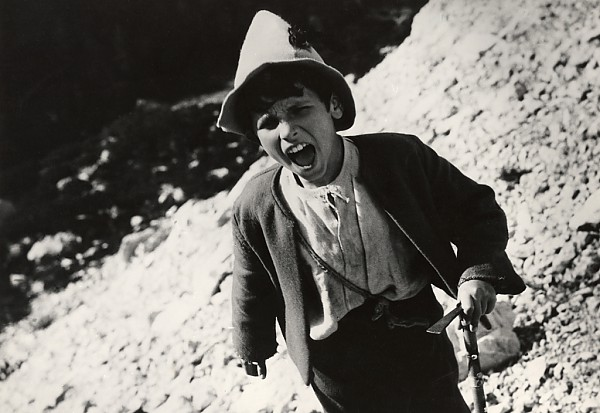
Matija Barl (Kekec I) — Gjurin (Kekec II) — Zlatko Krasnič (Kekec III)
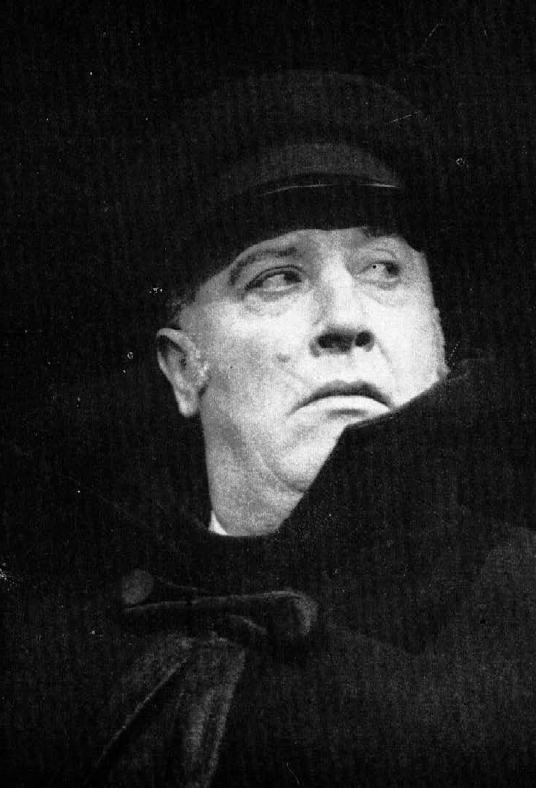
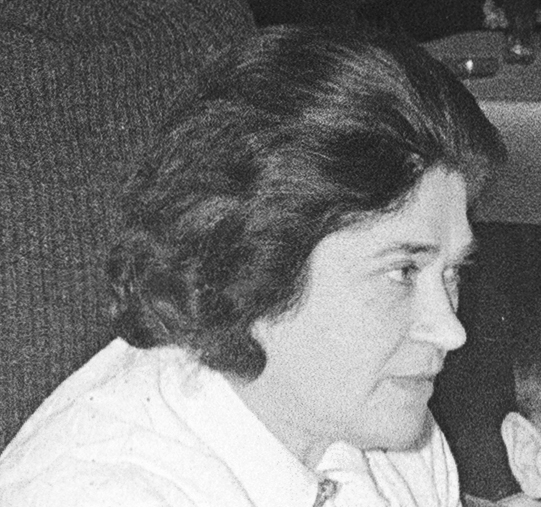
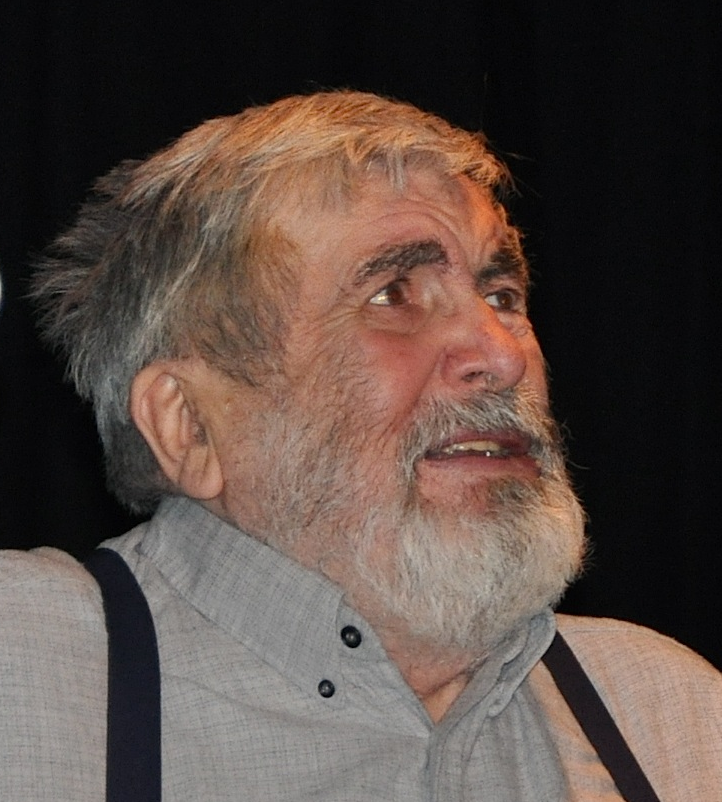
Presetnik (Bedanec I) — Ruša Bojc (Pehta) — Bibič (Bedanec II)

== Gale's film trilogy ==
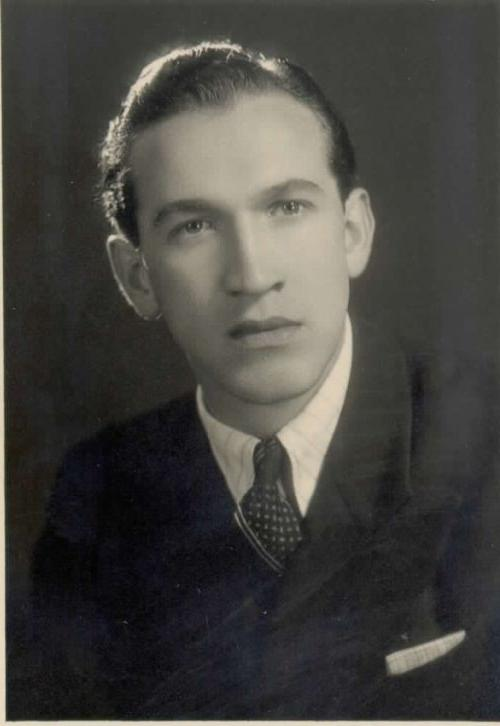
Jože Gale (trilogy director)

Jože Gale directed Slovene/Yugoslav film trilogy about Kekec, based on novels by Josip Vandot, but only the first and second film were a direct adaptation of the second and third book:

#	Title	Premiere	Director	Producer	Composer	Prod. company	Distribution	Based on	Character (actor)	Note
1	"Kekec"	18 December 1951	Jože Gale	Dušan Povh	Marjan Kozina	Triglav Film	Vesna film (prvotno); Viba film (trenutno)	"Kekec nad samotnim breznom" (1924)	Kekec (Matija Barl); Kosobrin (Frane Milčinski); Bedanec (France Presetnik); Mojca (Zdenka Logar); Tinka (Alenka Lobnikar); Rožle (Jože Mlakar); Mišnjek (Modest Sancin)	first ever Slovenian feature film with international award
2	"Good Luck, Kekec" (Srečno, Kekec!)	15 December 1963	Jože Gale	Dušan Povh	Marjan Vodopivec	Viba film	Viba film	"Kekec na volčji sledi" (1922)	Kekec (Velimir Gjurin); Mojca (Blanka Florjanc); Rožle (Martin Mele); Pehta (Ruša Bojc) oče (Bert Sotlar) mati (Marija Goršič) berač (Stane Sever)	first ever Slovenian feature film in colors
3	"Kekec's Tricks" (Kekčeve ukane)	23 December 1968	Jože Gale	Ljubo Struna	Bojan Adamič	Viba film	Vesna film (prvotno); Viba film (trenutno)	"po motivih Vandotovih pripovedk o Kekcu"	Kekec (Zlatko Krasnič); Bedanec (Polde Bibič); Rožle (Boris Ivanovski); Mojca (Jasna Krofak); Tinkara (Fanika Podobnikar); Brincelj (Milorad Radovič); Vitranc (Jože Zupan)	the last and the worst film about Kekec bad critics and low cinema visit
