= Sand, Love and Salt =

1957 film

- Film poster
- Directed by: František Čáp
- Written by: František Čáp; Vjekoslav Dobrincic; Johannes Kai
- Produced by: Heinrich Schier
- Starring: Marcello Mastroianni
- Cinematography: Václav Vích
- Edited by: Friedel Buckow
- Distributed by: Cineriz
- Release date: 27 February 1957
- Running time: 94 minutes
- Country: Italy
- Language: Italian

Sand, Love and Salt (Italian: La ragazza della salina) is a 1957 Italian-German-Yugoslavian comedy film directed by František Čáp.

== Plot ==
Marina is a young orphan from the coast who struggles to support her and her two younger brothers, her only support is Nicola, in love with her but not reciprocated by her. One day she goes out to sea, but a storm arrives that wrecks her little boat. She is saved by Pietro, a young fisherman who welcomes her into her house and starts courting her.

Not being able to fish anymore Marina she decides to go to work in the salt pan accompanied by her brothers, asking for the same place that her father had. Pietro too, with all her men, gets hired at the salt pan in order not to stay away from her. Alberto, the dishonest supervisor of the salt pan tries several times to approach Marina who always manages to escape. All this gives rise to the jealousy of Vida, another worker in the salt pan, and Alberto's clandestine lover.

One evening the events precipitate, Vida desperate after another quarrel with Marina, she confesses to Alberto that she is expecting a child, but the man rejects her badly, the girl falls and dies. The man who had been accused by the workers of withholding part of the wages decides to flee the island but is stopped by Nicola and Piero managing to exonerate Marina, accused of the girl's death.

The following morning Marina thanking Nicola for the help received accepts his proposal to leave with him but when she realizes that Pietro is also leaving for the island she runs to the pier and followed by her brothers throws herself into the sea and then gets on board his boat and stay with him.

== Cast ==
- Marcello Mastroianni as Piero
- Isabelle Corey as Marina
- Jester Naefe as Vida
- Trude Hesterberg as Mother of Vida
- Edith Schultze-Westrum as Mother of Piero
- Kai Fischer as Lola
- Peter Carsten as Alberto
- Hans Reiser as Nico
- Mario Adorf as Coco
- Stane Sever as Father of Vida
- Relja Bašić as Innkeeper
