= Eduard Linkers =

Austrian actor (1912–2004)

- Born: 11 October 1912; Czernowitz, Bukovina, Austria-Hungary (now Chernivtsi, Ukraine)
- Died: 3 April 2004 (aged 91); Wartenberg, Bavaria, Germany
- Occupation: Actor
- Years active: 1936–1988

Eduard Linkers (11 October 1912 – 3 April 2004) was an Austrian actor. He appeared in more than 70 films between 1936 and 1988.

== Life ==
He was born as Eduard Linker to a family of Jewish descent in Czernowitz, Austria-Hungary. He studied acting in Vienna, where he also started his acting career. After Anschluss he escaped to Czechoslovakia. He made his living by teaching English. That's how he met a Czech director František Čáp, who cast him in his movie Men Without Wings (1946). In 1952 he moved to Germany, where he acted in American productions. He spoke Romanian, German, English, Czech, French and Italian.

== Selected filmography ==
- Catherine the Last (1936) - Steinschneider, Braun's secretary
- Peter im Schnee (1937) - Theobald Flambach
- Men Without Wings (1946) - Ullmann
- Nadlidé (1946)
- Uloupená hranice (1947) - Czapan
- Nobody Knows Anything (1947) - SS-man Fritz Heinecke
- Krakatit (1948) - Carson
- Getting on in the World (1948) - Banker Antonín Klika
- Zelená knížka (1949) - Salesman Karel Bocan
- Pětistovka (1949)
- Soudný den (1949)
- Křížová trojka (1948) - Dr. Hadrbolec
- Cuba Cabana (1952) - Honneg
- Dutch Girl (1953) - Polizeiwachtmeister
- Das Licht der Liebe (1954) - Gläubiger Walter Zellers
- They Were So Young (1954) - M. Albert
- Jackboot Mutiny (1955) - SS-Mann
- The Double Husband (1955) - Bachwitz
- Mr. Arkadin (1955) - Second Policeman - Munich
- Die Wirtin zur Goldenen Krone (1955) - Finanzminister Bollemann
- Kitty and the Great Big World (1956) - Gastjaiswort
- Das Mädchen Marion (1956) - Sawatzki, Pferdehändler
- Der Etappenhase (1957) - Zahlmeister Kranz
- A Farewell to Arms (1957) - Lieutenant Zimmerman
- Escape from Sahara (1958)
- Nackt wie Gott sie schuf (1958)
- Mein Schatz ist aus Tirol (1958)
- The Domestic Tyrant (1959) - Prosecutor
- Heiße Ware (1959) - Ludwig Klein
- Labyrinth (1959) - Jacques
- Orientalische Nächte (1960) - Tomaides
- Himmel, Amor und Zwirn (1960)
- I Aim at the Stars (1960) - Minor Role (uncredited)
- The Last Pedestrian (1960) - Herr im Mercedes (uncredited)
- Question 7 (1961) - Otto Zingler - Werkmeister
- The Festival Girls (1961) - Jerome
- A Matter of WHO (1961) - Linkers
- I Must Go to the City (1962) - Bankdirektor Sieper
- Freud: The Secret Passion (1962) - Dr. Torsch (uncredited)
- Als ich noch der Waldbauernbub war... (1963) - Narrator (voice)
- Aus meiner Waldheimat (1963) - Narrator (voice)
- Als ich beim Käthele im Wald war (1963) - Narrator (voice)
- Encounter in Salzburg (1964)
- The Defector (1966) - Fluchthelfer Franz Ritter (uncredited)
- Jack of Diamonds (1967) - Geisling
- Before Winter Comes (1969) - Businessman
- Deep End (1970) - Cinema Owner
- Hurra, ein toller Onkel wird Papa (1970)
- Bloody Friday (1972) - Dr. Gutwein (uncredited)
- The Salzburg Connection (1972) - Tour Guide
- All People Will Be Brothers (1973) - Mann mit Bart
- Steppenwolf (1974) - Mr. Hefte
- The Marquise of O (1976) - Der Arzt
- Derrick (1976-1994) - Kellner / Älteres Ehepaar / Hotelportier / Herr Renz (Last appearance)
- Die Jugendstreiche des Knaben Karl (1977)
- Son of Hitler (1978) - Postmaster
- Fantômas - Season 1, Episode 2: "Le Tramway Fantôme" (1980) - Mme. Kirsh
- Malevil (1981) - Fabrelatre
- Lovec senzací (1989) - Kishuv otec
