= Matija Barl =

Slovenian actor, producer, and translator (1940–2018)

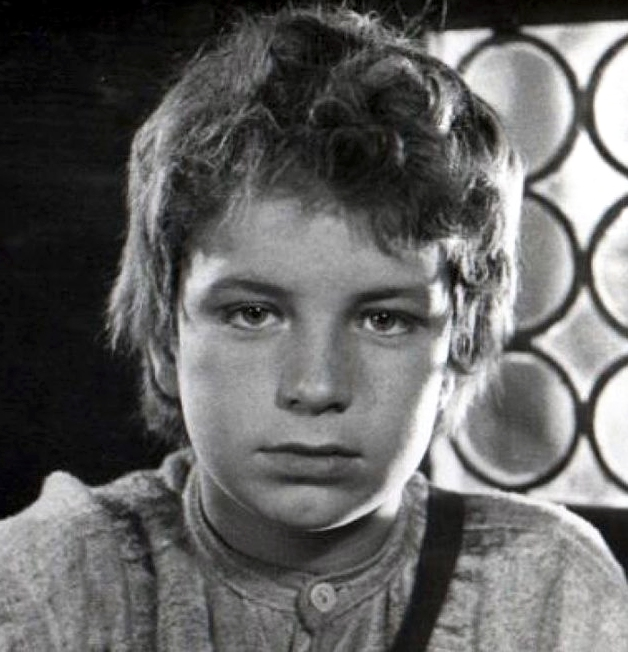
- Barl as Kekec in 1951
- Born: 17 February 1940; Ljubljana, Yugoslavia
- Died: 3 August 2018 (aged 78); Marezige, Slovenia
- Occupations: actor, translator, producer
- Writing career
- Years active: 1951-2003

Matija Barl (17 February 1940 – 3 August 2018) was a Slovenian actor, producer and translator. In 1962 he founded and organized the first, oldest and most important Slovenian music festival called Slovenska popevka.

== Biography ==
Barl was born in Ljubljana and lived around where he loved to play. When he was 11 years he went to the audition for the movie Kekec where he was chosen out of more than a thousand kids. He got the role of main character Kekec, a strong and fearless child superhero, for which he is best known today. Everyone identified him with this role so strongly that all the kids in real life wanted to fight with him. So he had to take classes for martial arts such as wrestling and judo.

Later he attended the Academy for Theatre, Radio, Film and Television in Ljubljana where he studied dramaturgy. In 1962 he moved to Germany where he worked as independent producer, translator and occasional actor. He lived in Marezige, Slovenia.

== Work ==
Barl is best known for playing role of the Kekec character. He also wrote lyrics for songs of important Slovenian music artists, work as producer, performing in documentary. His works are:

- Kekec (1951) - actor
- Schwarz und weiß wie Tage und Nächte (TV movie, 1978) - actor
- Pozabljeni zaklad (2006) - actor
- Madame Pompadour (TV movie, 1974) - unit manager
- Schwarz und weiß wie Tage und Nächte (TV movie, 1978) - production leader
- Zgodba gospoda P.F. (documentary, 2002) - composer
- God Does Not Believe in Us Anymore (TV movie, 1982) - producer
- Der verliebte Teufel (TV movie, 1971) - assistant director
- Monty Python's Fliegender Zirkus (TV movie, 1971) - location manager
