= Andrej Rozman =

Slovene poet, writer, actor and street theatre producer

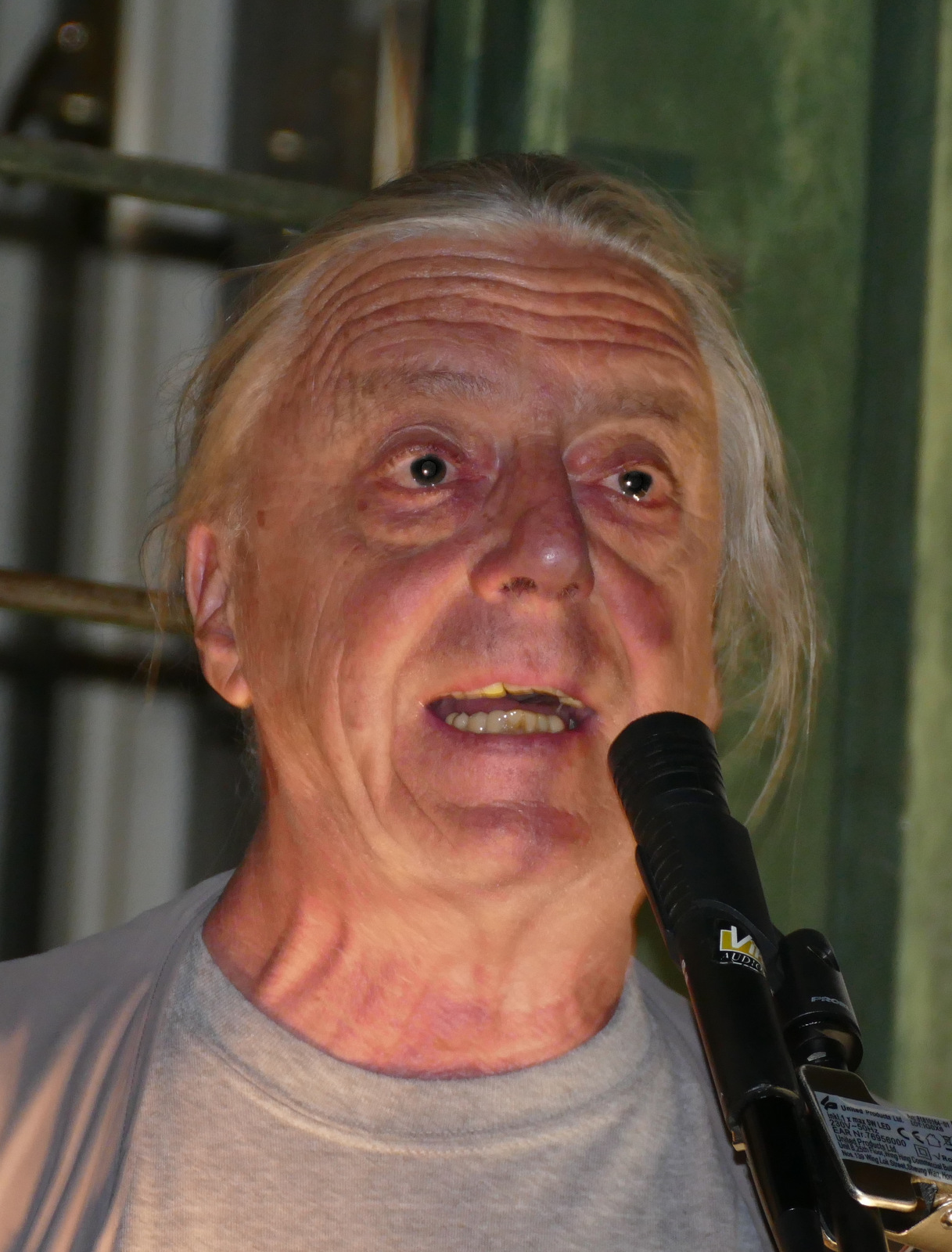
- Rozman in 2020
- Born: 25 May 1955 (age 71); Ljubljana, Socialist Federal Republic of Yugoslavia (now in Slovenia)
- Occupations: writer, poet, actor and translator
- Writing career
- Notable work: Uganke 100+1, Črvive pesmi
- Notable awards: Prešeren Foundation Award; 2010 for his theatre and literary work Levstik Award; 1999 for Črvive pesmi Levstik Award; 2009 for 100 + 1 uganka

Andrej Rozman (a.k.a. Roza, born 25 May 1955) is a Slovene poet, writer, actor, and street theatre producer. He writes poems and creates plays for children and also writes satirical poetry for adults.

== Life and work ==
Rozman was born in Ljubljana in 1955. He abandoned his study of Slovene language and literature at the University of Ljubljana to set up a small theatre group in 1978. In the 1980s he co-founded a street theatre group, Ana Monró Theatre and was its director between 1982 and 1995. He was co-writer of the low-budget TV comedy Vrtičkarji (2000), but left after the first thirteen episodes, disappointed by the production. Since 2003 he has run his own theatre company Rozinteater.

== Awards ==
Rozman won the Levstik Award in 1999 for Črvive pesmi (Worm-Ridden Poems) and again in 2009 for 100 + 1 uganka (100 + 1 Riddles).

In 2010 he won the Prešeren Foundation Award for his theatre and literary work.

== Published works ==
- S smetano nad jagode (Taking the Cream into the Strawberries), poems and short stories, 1989
- Od talija do torija, theatre scripts, 1991
- Rimanice za predgospodiče (Rhymes for Pre-misses), poems for children, 1993
- Mihec, duh in uganka (Little Miha, the Ghost and the Riddle), poem for children, 1996
- Je že vredu mama (It's Alright Mum), poems, 1997
- Črvive pesmi (Worm-ridden Poems), poetry for children, 1998
- Krava, ki jo je pasel Mihec (The Cow Little Miha Looked After), poetry for children, 1999
- Josip Vandot: Kekec in Pehta, adaptation of Josip Vandot's story, 2000
- Mali rimski cirkus (The Little Roman Circus), poetry for children, 2001
- Balon velikan (The Giant Balloon), fairytale, 2001
- Rdeča žaba, zlat labod (Red Frog, Golden Swan), children's book, 2001
- Josip Vandot: Kekec in Bedanec, adaptation of Josip Vandot's story, 2001
- Najbolj dolgočasna knjiga na svetu (The Most Boring Book in the World), children's book, 2002
- Uganke (Riddles), poetry for children, 2002
- Josip Vandot: Kekec in Prisank, adaptation of Josip Vandot's story, 2002
- Razmigajmo se v križu (Let's Exercise), poems, 2003
- Marela (Umbrella), poetry for children, 2005
- Tih bot dedi (Shut Up Grandpa), poetry for children, 2005
- SMS poezija (SMS Poetry), poetry, 2006
- Mihec gre prvič okrog sveta (Michael's First Trip Around the World), children's book, 2006
- Kako je Oskar postal detektiv/How Oscar Became a Detective, short stories for children (bilingual), 2007
