= Vesna (film) =

- Directed by: František Čap
- Written by: Matej Bor; František Čap
- Starring: Metka Gabrijelčič; Franek Trefalt; Janez Čuk; Jure Furlan; Stane Sever; Elvira Kralj; Frane Milčinski - Ježek
- Music by: Bojan Adamič
- Release date: 16 December 1953
- Running time: 96 minutes
- Country: Yugoslavia
- Language: Slovene

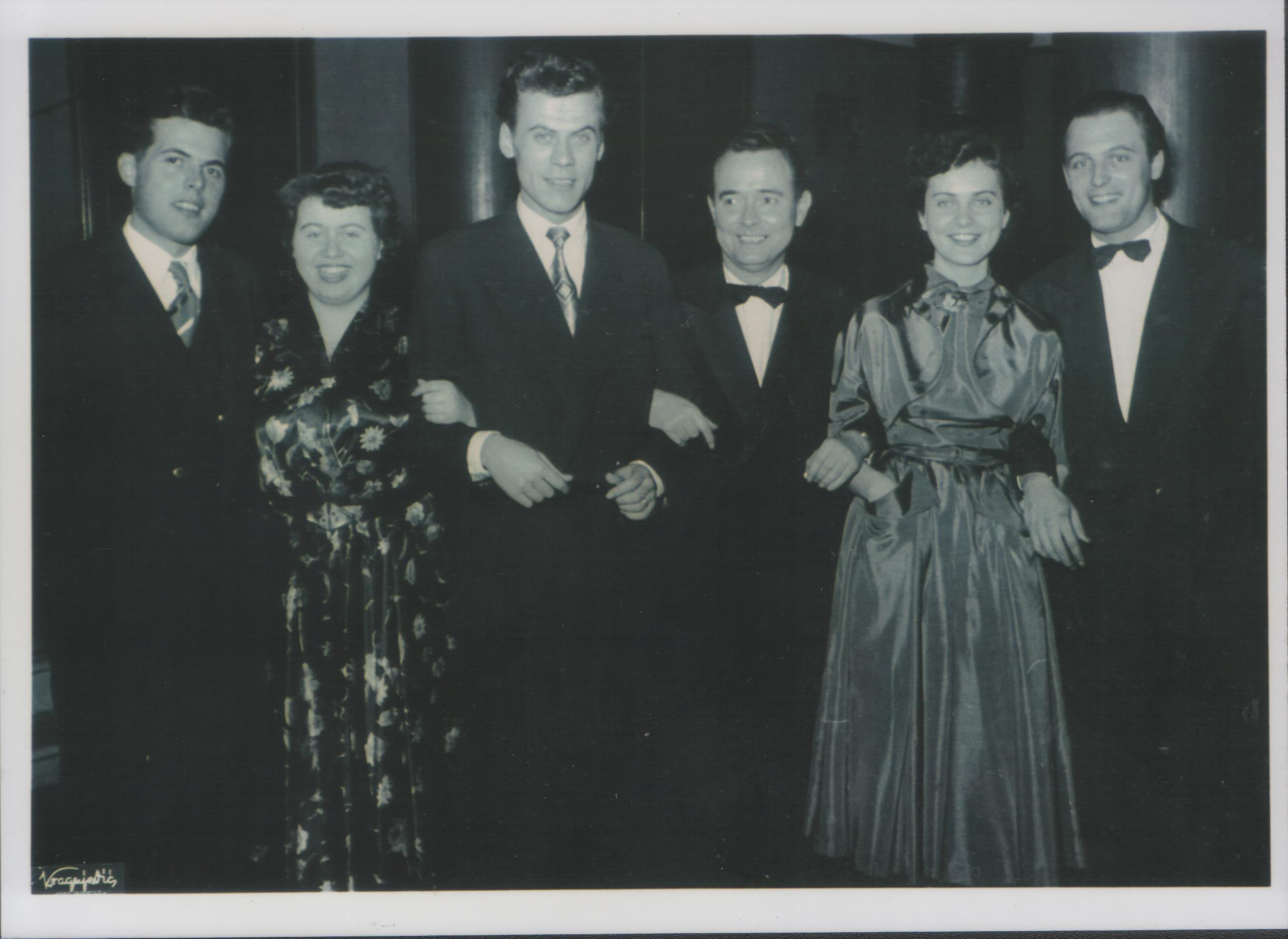
The cast and director at the film's premiere in Belgrade in 1953.

Vesna is a 1953 Yugoslav romantic comedy directed by František Čap and shot in Slovene language. It is considered among the most watched Slovene films. It has a 1957 sequel Ne čakaj na maj ("Do not Wait for May").

== Plot ==
Three brothers, Samo, Sandi and Krištof think up a plot to get hold of maths finals test papers from their professor at secondary school through courting a girl they assume is his daughter. Not knowing her true name, they call her Vesna, after the Slavic goddess of Spring. The professor's real daughter, the attractive Janja turns up for a date with Samo and they fall in love. When Vesna / Janja finds out the original reason for Samo's interest in her, she does not want to see him again, but eventually changes her mind.
