= Polde Bibič =

Slovenian actor (1933–2012)

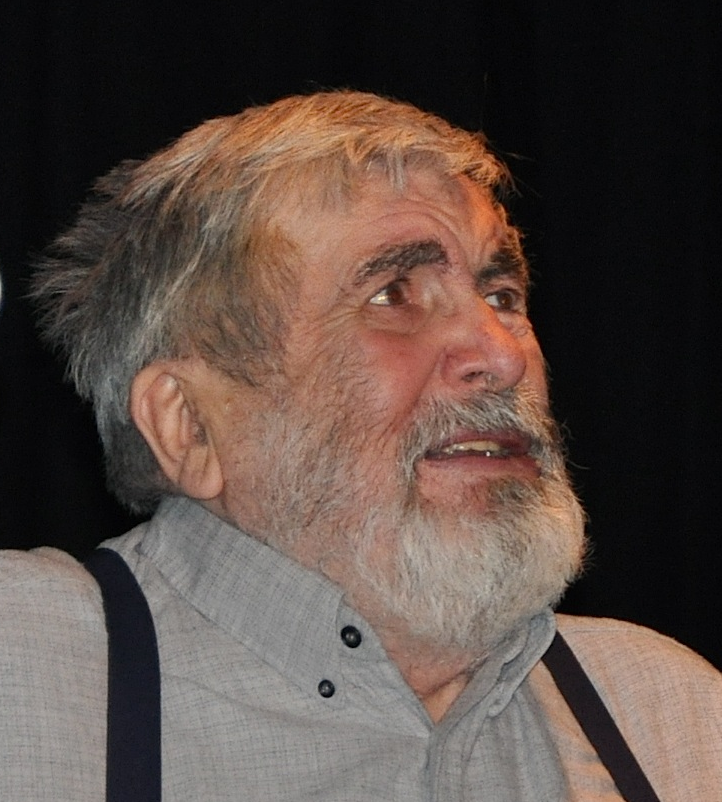
- Polde Bibič (2012)
- Born: 3 February 1933; Maribor, Drava Banovina, Kingdom of Yugoslavia
- Died: 13 July 2012 (aged 79); Ljubljana, Slovenia
- Education: Ljubljana Academy of Theater, Radio, Film and Television
- Occupations: Actor, professor, writer
- Years active: 1955–2010

Polde Bibič (3 February 1933 – 13 July 2012) was a Slovenian stage and film actor, a writer, and an academic professor, best known for his role in the film Flowers in Autumn and his work in theater, Bibič was a recipient of several top awards in the field of arts in Slovenia.

== Life ==
Bibič was born in Maribor. He attended the secondary school in the town and then studied stage plays in Ljubljana under Vida Juvan. He finished his studies in 1961. He first appeared in the film Moments of Decision (Trenutki odločitve; 1955), directed by František Čap. Later, he worked in the Ljubljana Drama Theatre, where he was also the director from 1977 until 1981. He was a professor of theatre at the Ljubljana Academy of Theatre, Radio, Film and Television. He died aged 79 in Ljubljana.

== Work ==
Bibič played a number of roles in many films that were well received in Slovenia: Don't Cry, Peter (1964), On Wings of Paper (1968), Kekec's Tricks (1968), Flowers in Autumn (1973), The Widowhood of Karolina Žašler (1976), Heritage (1986), Primož Trubar (1985), and My Dad, The Socialist Kulak (1987). Many of these were directed by Matjaž Klopčič. He also performed in television and radio drama.

Altogether, he played over 150 theatre and over 30 film roles. He wrote seven autobiographical books. Bibič was a member of the ensemble of the Ljubljana National Drama Theatre, where he remained active after his retirement in 1995 as well. He often played in Ljubljana City Theatre, Slovene theatre in Trieste, and experimental theatres.

Aside from acting, Bibič was also active in politics. After the Slovenian declaration of independence, he served two terms as a member of the National Council. However, as he later stated, he regretted his involvement with politics, as "he was not able to change anything".

== Awards and recognitions ==
For his work, he was awarded the Župančič Award (1974), the award for cultural achievements in the city of Ljubljana, the Prešeren Award (1977 and 1985), the highest Slovenian award in the field of culture, the Borštnik Ring (1984), the highest Slovenian award for actors, the Silver Order of Freedom of Republic of Slovenia (1996), and the Sterija Prize in Novi Sad in 1984.

At his death, Bibič was described by other Slovenian actors and writers as a giant, the prince of the theatre, and a legendary acting folk character. A deep admiration of him and appreciation of his work was also expressed by the President of Slovenia Danilo Türk and the Prime Minister Janez Janša.

== Filmography ==
=== Film ===
Year	Title
1955	Trenutki odločitve
1958	Dobro morje
1959	Dobri stari pianino
1961	Balada o trobenti in oblaku
1963	Samorastniki
1964	Zarota
1964	Ne joči, Peter
1967	Zgodba, ki je ni
1967	Grajski biki
1967	Na papirnatih avionih
1968	Kekčeve ukane
1971	Poslednja postaja
1971	Mrtva ladja
1973	Cvetje v jeseni
1973	Begunec
1973	Let mrtve ptice
1974	Pomladni veter
1974	Strah
1976	Bele trave
1976	Vdovstvo Karoline Žašler
1979	Iskanja
1982	Boj na požiralniku
1982	Razseljena oseba
1983	Dih
1983	Trije prispevki k slovenski blaznosti
1984	Veselo gostivanje
1984	Dediščina
1986	Heretik
1987	Moj ata, socialistični kulak
1988	Remington
1990	Ječarji
2005	Ruševine

=== Television ===
Year	Title
1965	Počitnice v Lipici
1969	Polikarp
1975	Obisk
1983	Strici so mi povedali
1985	Primož Trubar
1990	Waitapu
1990	Dirigenti i muzikaši
1996	Triptih Agate Schwarzkobler
1996	Peter in Petra
2001	Pavle
2001	Sorodne duše
2005	Ljubljana je ljubljena
2010	Darilo
