= Juvan =

Juvan is a Slovene surname. Notable people with this surname include:

- Kaja Juvan (born 2000), Slovene tennis player
- Vida Juvan (1905–1998), Slovene actress
