= Don't Whisper =

Ne čakaj na maj
- Directed by: František Čap
- Written by: František Čap
- Starring: Metka Gabrijelčič; Franek Trefalt; Janez Čuk; Jure Furlan; Stane Sever; Elvira Kralj; Frane Milčinski - Ježek
- Music by: Borut Lesjak
- Release date: 1 August 1957
- Running time: 107 minutes
- Country: Yugoslavia
- Language: Slovene

Ne čakaj na maj (lit. Do Not Wait for May, with the English title Don't Whisper) is a 1957 Slovene romantic comedy directed by František Čap. It is a sequel to the 1953 film Vesna.

== Synopsis ==
We meet the characters from Vesna again in this film. Vesna is on half-term holidays in the mountains, being looked after by her aunt. A meeting with Vesna's boyfriend upsets her family, and they decide that she should marry because they think she is pregnant. The confusion suits the young couple, who wanted to get married in the first place.
