= Zelená knížka =

1948 film directed

- Directed by: Josef Mach
- Written by: Josef Mach; Václav Rezác
- Starring: Eduard Linkers; Svetla Svozilova; Stanislav Neumann
- Release date: 1948
- Country: Czechoslovakia
- Language: Czech

Zelená knížka is a 1948 Czechoslovak film. The film starred Josef Kemr.

== Cast ==
- Eduard Linkers
- Svetla Svozilová
- Stanislav Neumann
- Otto Krcka
