= Good Luck, Kekec =

Good Luck, Kekec (Srečno, Kekec!)
- Directed by: Jože Gale
- Screenplay by: Ivan Ribič
- Based on: Kekec on the Wolf Trail by Josip Vandot
- Produced by: Dušan Povh
- Starring: Velimir Gjurin; Blanka Florjanc; Martin Mele; Ruša Bojc
- Cinematography: Ivan Marinček
- Edited by: Ivan Marinček
- Music by: Marjan Vodopivec
- Production company: Viba film
- Distributed by: Viba film
- Release date: 15 December 1963 (Slovenia)
- Running time: 77 minutes
- Countries: Slovenia; Yugoslavia
- Language: Slovenian

Good Luck, Kekec (Slovene: Srečno, Kekec!) is a 1963 Yugoslav/Slovenian adventure film directed by Jože Gale. Film was based on the Kekec on the Wolf Trail (Kekec na volčji sledi), a mountain narrative by Josip Vandot, second of three stories about Kekec, which was published in Slovenian youth magazine Zvonček in 1922. Film was produced and distributed at Viba film.

This is the second in the Jože Gale film series about Kekec and the others are: Kekec from 1951 and Kekec's Tricks (Kekčeve Ukane) from 1968.

== Plot summary ==
Kekec (Velimir Gjurin) and Rožle (Martin Mele) are shepherds for a farmer, who has a blind daughter Mojca (Blanka Florjanc), about their age. When it gets dark outside, they start a conversation about Aunt Pehta (Ruša Bojc), an evil woman from the mountains who supposedly steals children. Kekec, Mojca and Rožle go to an alpine hut in the morning. Kind Kekec promises Mojca that he will find a cure for her eyes.

Mojca goes to pick flowers. Aunt Pehta from the mountains appears, kidnaps her, and takes her to her alpine hut. Pehta wants to keep Mojca, because she sings so beautiful. Pehta is also a very good herbalist and finds a rare flower, which can cure Mojca's blind eyes.

Kekec and Rožle are searching for Mojca and come to Pehta's alpine hut, where Kekec heroically climbs on the hut's roof and saves Mojca. Mean Pehta sends her dangerous dog (Wolf) behind them, but they manage to escape. They run away across a wooden footbridge over the stream. Shy and frightened Rožle comes home scared and says that Pehta's dog Wolf probably ate Kekec and Mojca.

All the people from the village and Mojca's father search with torches for Kekec and Mojca, who spend the night at some mountain cave. Pehta notices the people and burns the hut. When Kekec brings Mojca home, she tells her mother that Pehta knows the cure for her eyes and immediately runs out of the house. Pehta captures Kekec and drags him to her secret mountain cave. Kekec challenges and provokes Pehta, that between all her cures she doesn't have one for eyes.

Pehta brags that she has it and if he hadn't taken Mojca with him, she would have been cured. Kekec tries to become friends with her, with Wolf and secretly searches for the magic cure. Pehta caught him and cruelly beats her dog. She told Kekec that cure is hiding in mini bottle on the necklace that she is wearing. At the end Pehta becomes sentimental and gives the necklace bottle to Kekec. He goes home to Mojca, put a few drops in her eyes and she can see again.

== Cast ==
| Actor | Character | Description |
|---|---|---|
| Velimir Gjurin | Kekec | The main character who's fighting Bedanec. Kekec had enormous impact in Slovenian pop culture. |
| Blanka Florjanc | Mojca | Sister of Rožle, blind girl captured by Pehta. |
| Martin Mele | Rožle | Frightened boy, a friend of Kekec and brother of Mojca. |
| Ruša Bojc | Pehta | Evil woman from the mountains, searching for herbs. |
| Bert Sotlar | father | |
| Marija Goršič | mother | |
| Stane Sever | beggar | |

== Photo gallery ==
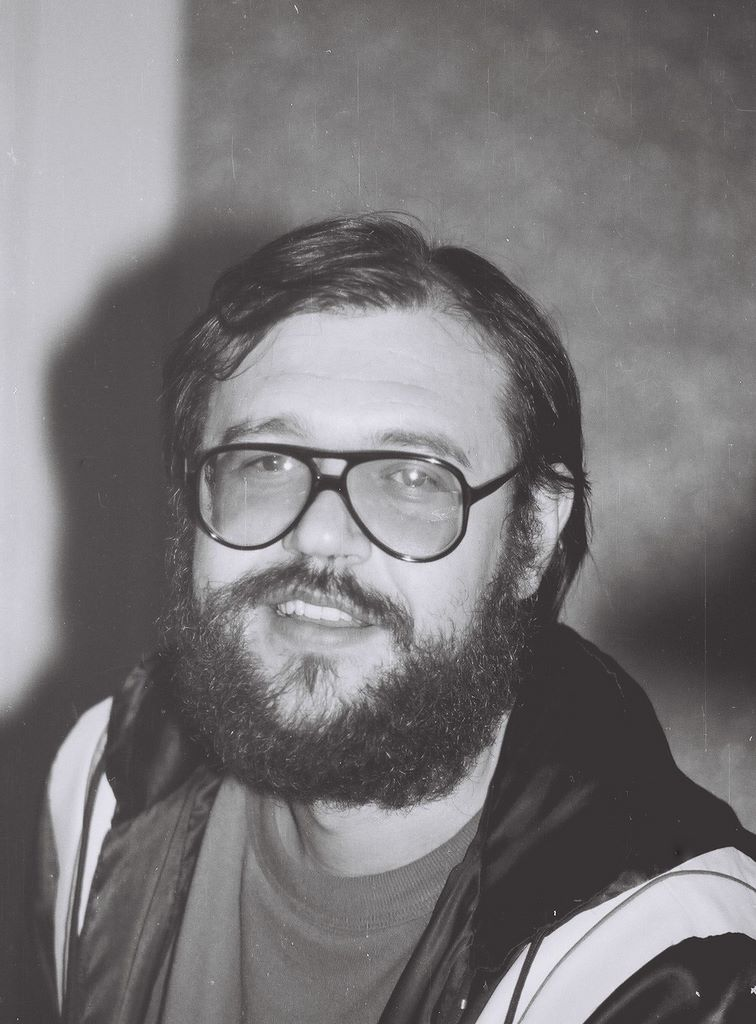
Velimir Gjurin (1980s)

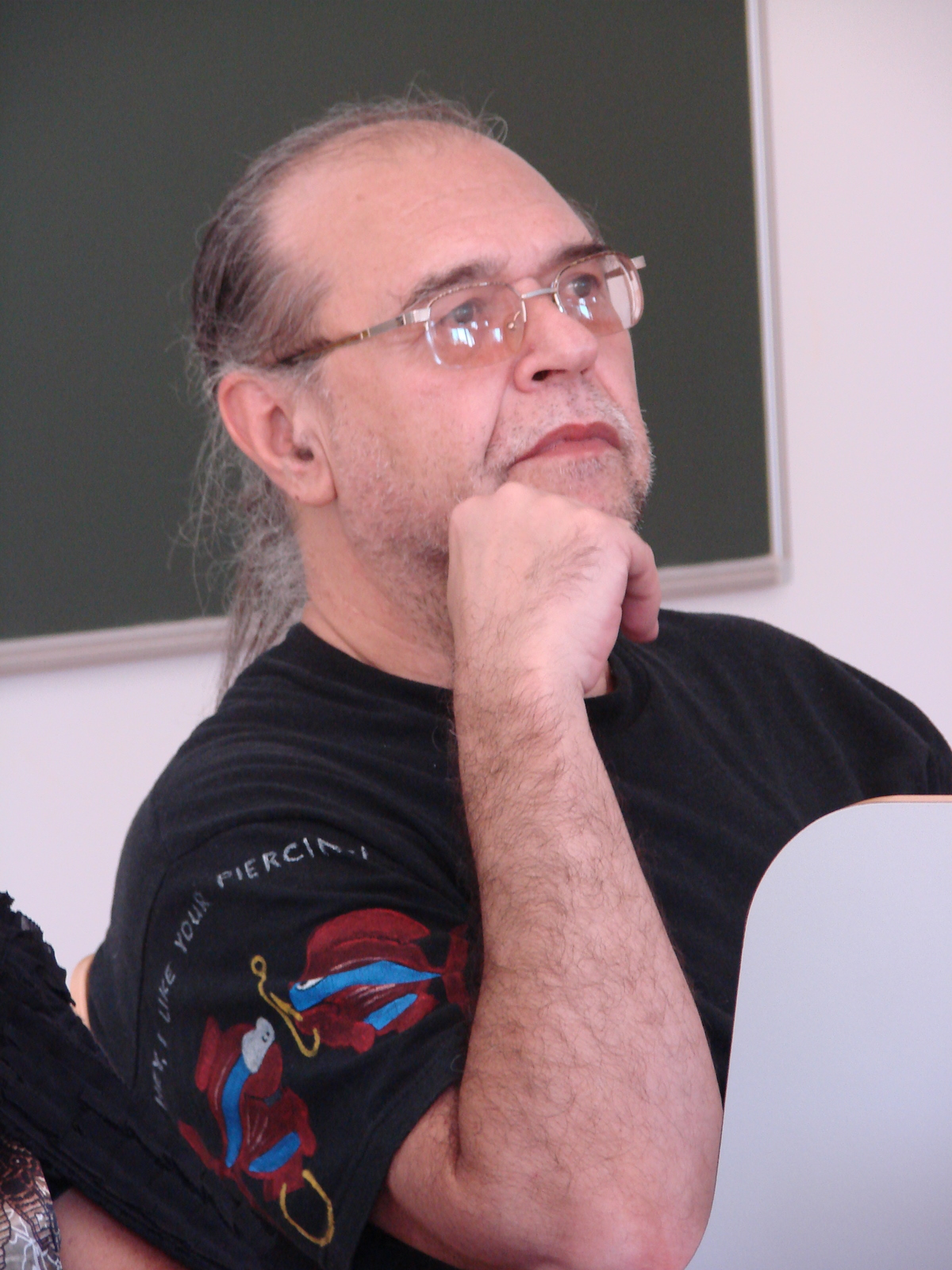
Velimir Gjurin (2011)

=== Shooting locations ===
| Photo | Location | Municipality | Note |
|---|---|---|---|
| | Trenta | Bovec | Kekčeva domačija |
| | under Mangart | Bovec | Most of the film was shot. |

=== After the film premiere ===
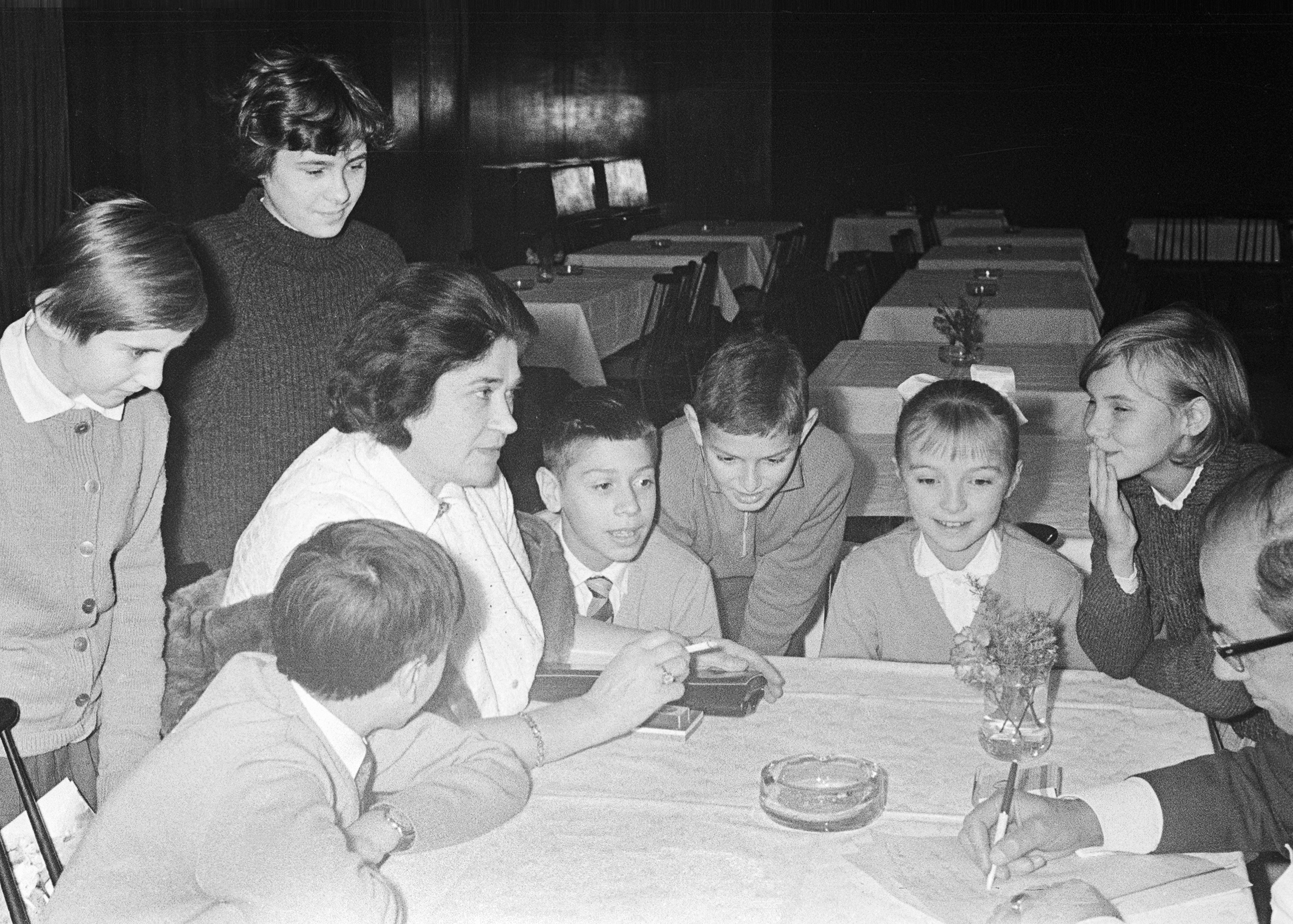
form left to the right:
Velimir Gjurin (Kekec)
Ruša Bojc (Pehta)
Martin Mele (Rožle)
Blanka Florjanc (Mojca)
after the premiere

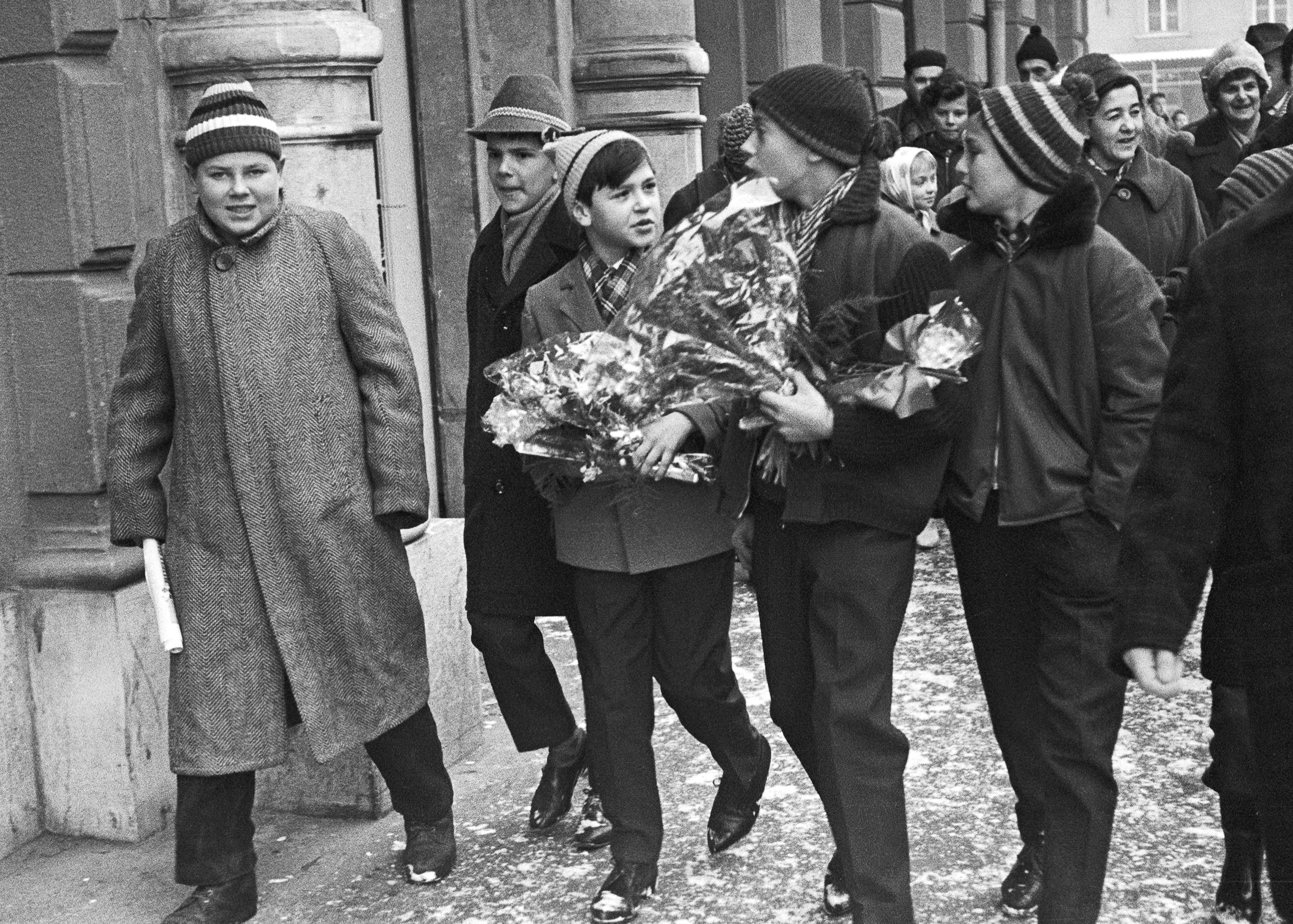
3rd by left:Gjurin (Kekec)
4th by left: Mele (Rožle)
after the premiere

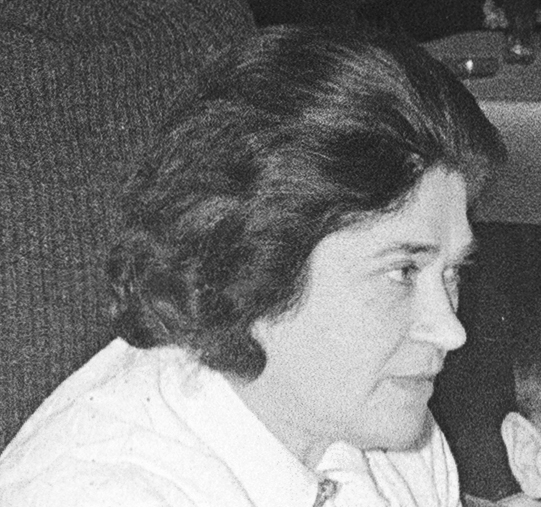
Ruša Bojc (Pehta)
after the premiere

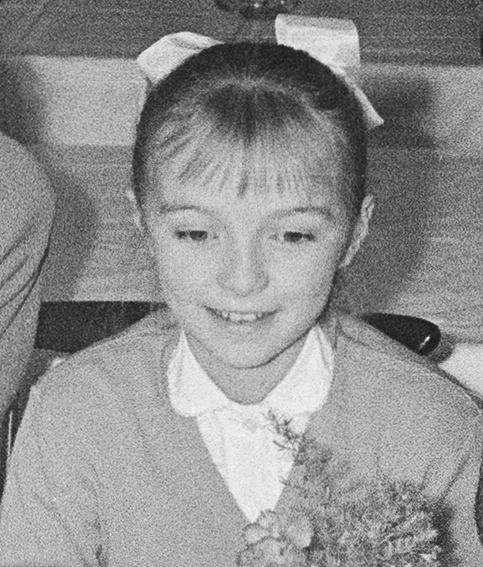
Blanka Florjanc (Mojca)
after the premiere

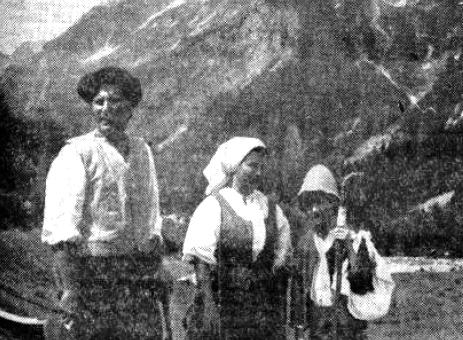
scene from film

== Awards ==
This is the second Gale's film about Kekec with international award. At 25th Venice International Film Festival in 1964, this film took third place, a bronze Osella, for most educational film in youth category.

== Music ==
The whole music including theme was composed by Marjan Vodopivec, a Slovenian composer. Lyrics for theme song called "Kekčeva pesem" was written by Kajetan Kovič and performed by Martin Lumbar together with Slovenian Philharmonic Orchestra.
