= Nocturnal Butterfly =

- Theatrical release poster
- Directed by: František Čáp
- Written by: František Čáp; Václav Krška
- Based on: Noční motýl by Karel Novák
- Produced by: Vilém Brož
- Starring: Hana Vítová; Svatopluk Beneš
- Cinematography: Ferdinand Pečenka
- Edited by: Antonín Zelenka
- Music by: Roman Blahník
- Production company: Lucernafilm
- Distributed by: Lucernafilm
- Release date: 10 October 1941
- Running time: 89 minutes
- Countries: Protectorate of Bohemia and Moravia
- Language: Czech

Nocturnal Butterfly (Czech: Noční motýl) is a 1941 Czech drama film directed by František Čáp based on a novel by Karel Novák. It was shown in 9th Venice Film Festival where it won a prize Targa di segnalazione.

The film was dubbed into German and released under the name Der Nachtfalter in 1943.

== Cast ==
- Hana Vítová as Marta Dekasová
- Svatopluk Beneš as Lieutenant of King's Guard Rudolf Kala
- Gustav Nezval as Senior lieutenant of King's Guard Varga
- Marie Glázrová as Varga's wife Helena
- Adina Mandlová as Prostitute Anča nicknamed Kiki
- Rudolf Hrušínský as Student Michal Lary
- Jaroslav Marvan as Marta's employer
- Elena Hálková as Marta's employer
- Renée Lavecká as Mášenka, their daughter
- Marie Blažková as Housekeeper Katynka
- Eduard Kohout as Mr. Leopold
- Anna Steimarová as Madame from bar

== Release ==
The movie was released online on YouTube by Czech Film Archive on 16 February 2019.
