= Čachovice =

- Municipality
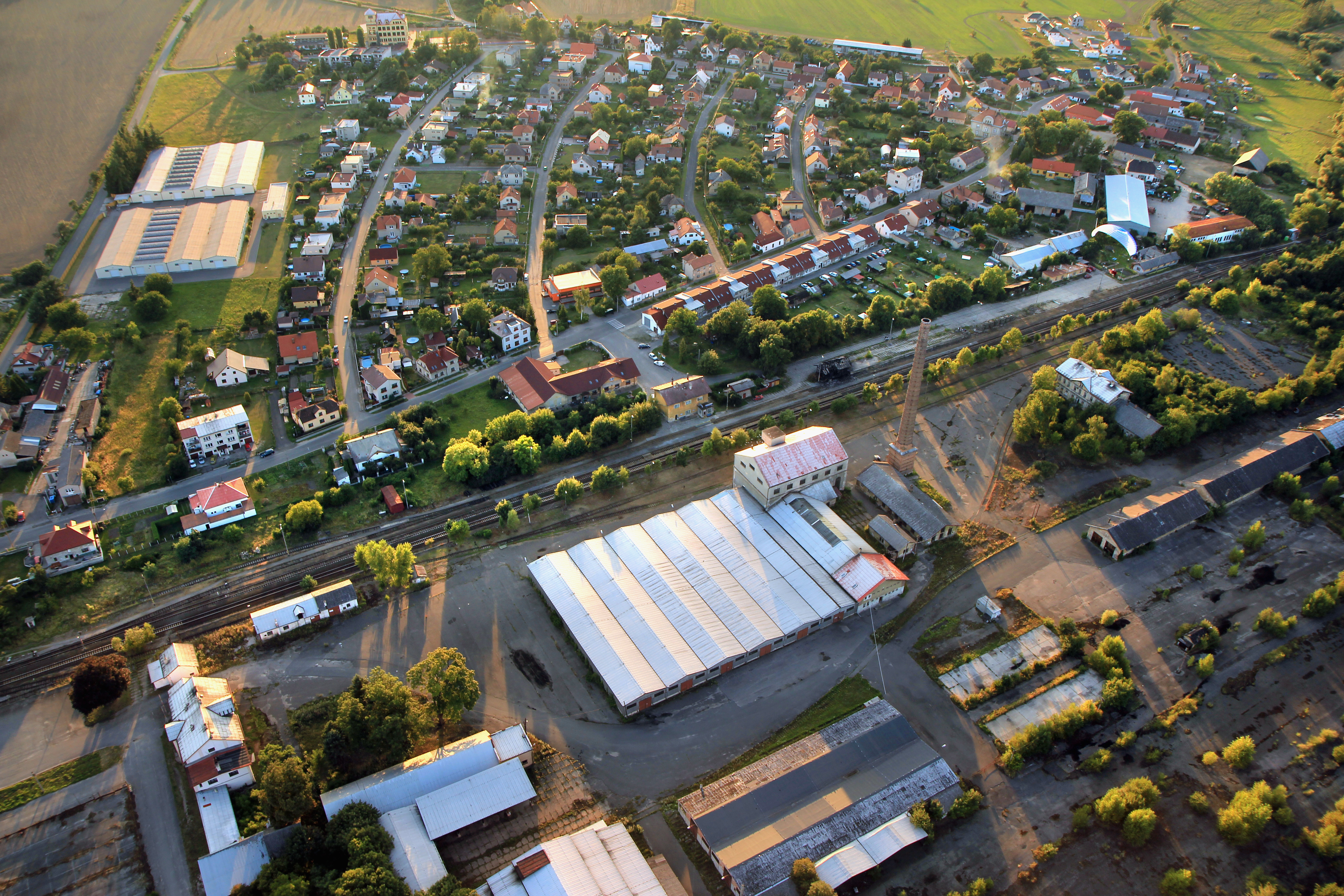
- Aerial view

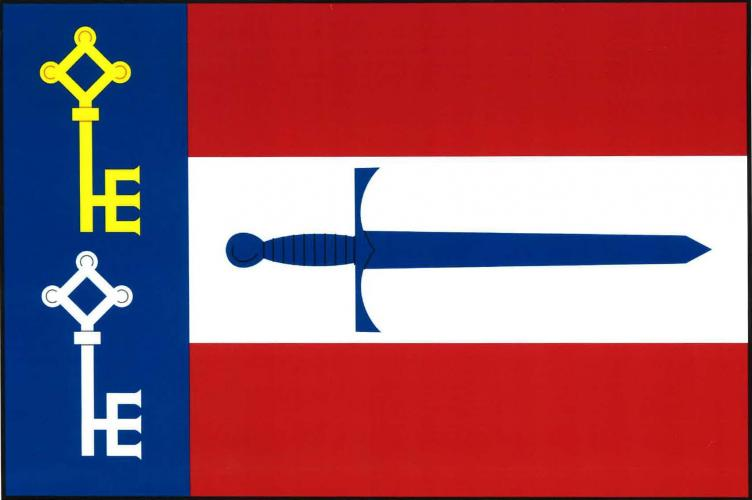
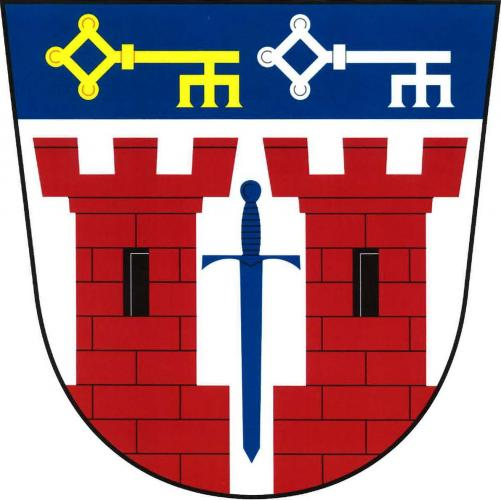
- Flag Coat of arms

- Location in the Czech Republic
- Coordinates: 50°16′32″N 14°56′46″E
- Country: Czech Republic
- Region: Central Bohemian
- District: Mladá Boleslav
- First mentioned: 1088

Area
  - Total: 9.90 km^{2} (3.82 sq mi)
- Elevation: 207 m (679 ft)

Population (2026-01-01)
  - Total: 880
  - Density: 89/km^{2} (230/sq mi)
- Time zone: UTC+1 (CET)
  - Summer (DST): UTC+2 (CEST)
- Postal code: 294 43
- Website: www.cachovice.cz

Čachovice is a municipality and village in Mladá Boleslav District in the Central Bohemian Region of the Czech Republic. It has about 900 inhabitants.

== Administrative division ==
Čachovice consists of two municipal parts (in brackets population according to the 2021 census):

- Čachovice (552)
- Struhy (329)

== Etymology ==
The village was named after a lord named Čach, who had a fortress in the area.

== Geography ==
Čachovice is located about 16 kilometres (10 mi) south of Mladá Boleslav and 34 km (21 mi) northeast of Prague. It lies in a flat agricultural land of the Jizera Table. The municipality is situated on the right bank of the Vlkava River.

== History ==
The first written mention of Čachovice is from 1088, when it was donated to the Vyšehrad Chapter. From the early 15th century, for several generations, it was property of the Chlumský family. Around 1600, it was shortly owned by the royal chamber, then it often changed owners. From 1789 until the establishment of an independent municipality in 1850, Čachovice and Struhy was part of the Loučeň estate. Among its owners were the Thurn und Taxis family and during their rule Čachovice significantly developed. Struhy used to be more populated village than Čachovice until 1870, when a sugar factory was founded there, which meant building development and an influx of residents.

== Demographics ==
Historical population

Year	Pop.	±%
1869	570	—
1880	941	+65.1%
1890	1,049	+11.5%
1900	967	−7.8%
1910	1,032	+6.7%

Year	Pop.	±%
1921	1,099	+6.5%
1930	1,060	−3.5%
1950	923	−12.9%
1961	1,016	+10.1%
1970	910	−10.4%

Year	Pop.	±%
1980	849	−6.7%
1991	757	−10.8%
2001	742	−2.0%
2011	849	+14.4%
2021	881	+3.8%

Source: Censuses

== Transport ==
Čachovice is located on the railway line Mladá Boleslav–Nymburk.

== Sights ==
The main landmark is the Church of Saints Peter and Paul in Struhy. It is an early Baroque church from the 17th century.

== Notable people ==
- František Čáp (1913–1972), film director
