= Twinkle Sleepyhead =

1952 Slovenian radio play

Twinkle Sleepyhead (Slovene: Zvezdica Zaspanka), also The Sleepy Twinkle Star or The Sleepy Little Star, was the first Slovene radio play. It was written by Frane Milčinski in 1952. Since 1955, it has been performed with some interruptions as a puppet theatre play. In 1959, after it was published as a book story, Ježek won the Levstik Award for it. It remains one of the most popular children's stories in Slovenia.

== Plot ==
Twinkle Sleepyhead is the youngest star in the sky. Because she constantly comes late to her work, the Moon sends her to Earth to punish her. She may return to the sky when she proves that she has learnt her lesson. Among the people she meets on Earth there is also a bandit Ceferin, who wants to steal her golden hair. Due to the Twinkle Sleepyhead's innocent goodness his heart starts to beat instead of the stone he had before. Twinkle Sleepyhead returns to the sky.
