= Nezval =

Nezval (feminine: Nezvalová) is a Czech surname. Notable people with the surname include:

- Gustav Nezval (1907–1998), Czech actor
- Jiří Nezval (born 1941), Czech politician (cs)
- Martin Nezval (born 1960), Czech writer (cs)
- Vítězslav Nezval (1900–1958), Czech writer
