= All Clues Lead to Berlin =

1952 film

- Scene shot amongst the remains of the ruined Reichstag
- Directed by: František Čáp
- Written by: Artur Brauner; Hans Rameau
- Produced by: Artur Brauner
- Starring: Gordon Howard; Irina Garden; Kurt Meisel
- Cinematography: Helmut Ashley
- Edited by: Johanna Meisel
- Music by: Herbert Trantow
- Production company: CCC Film
- Distributed by: Prisma-Filmverleih; Associated British-Pathé (UK)
- Release date: 28 November 1952
- Running time: 89 minutes
- Country: West Germany
- Language: German

All Clues Lead to Berlin (German: Die Spur führt nach Berlin) is a 1952 West German thriller film directed by František Čáp and starring Gordon Howard, Irina Garden and Kurt Meisel. It is also known by the alternative titles Adventure in Berlin and International Counterfeiters.

It portrays a gang of counterfeiters with links to the former Nazi regime. It was shot at the Spandau Studios and on location across Berlin including at the ruins of the Reichstag building. The film's sets were designed by the art directors Emil Hasler and Walter Kutz. It was given a British release in 1953.

== Plot ==
Berlin in the early 1950s. Two men take the elevator up the Berlin radio tower. A heated argument ensues between the two. One man asks the other one not to resist and to come with him. "She informed us," he says ambiguously. When the other one refuses, the first one pulls out a revolver. A scuffle ensues, then a shot is fired, which is drowned out by a plane flying over the top of the radio tower. The gunman flees back down in the elevator. Meanwhile, on the restaurant level below, a young, elegant woman is waiting, drinking a coffee and reading 'Stern' magazine. The man who was shot also had a copy of 'Stern' on him, obviously an agreed sign to ensure the two would recognize one another. The woman sees the shooter for a brief moment in front of the elevator, then rushes up to the viewing platform and sees the fatally wounded man dying, blood trickling from his chest. Another man with his wife and two young children have also arrived on the platform. With his dying breath, the man tells the father of the family the first syllable of a name, Dorn. Down at street level, the killer can be seen rushing across the street and speeding off in a black limousine that was waiting for him. The limousine driven by a crook called Martin races eastwards with police cars in hot pursuit. When the gangsters are about to be caught, Martin dashes through police blockade and escapes through the Brandenburg Gate to the east of the city.

Local detectives Wengen and Lüdecke are working a case involving large amounts of US dollar bills flooding West Berlin. When they hear of the shooting, they have a hunch that the two cases are related. Meanwhile, American lawyer Ronald Roberts arrives in Berlin, looking for a Karl Dornbrink. He looks up his daughter Vera Dornbrink, who works as a ballet teacher. She is the woman who was waiting for the murder victim in the restaurant. Roberts explains to Vera that her father inherited a farm in Ohio and $150,000 (approximately $1,700,000 in today's money) from his stepbrother. Vera explains to Roberts that her father died in a labor camp in Austria shortly before the end of the war. Roberts quickly takes a liking to Vera and the two start dating. However, Vera knows a lot more than she lets on. In fact, her father, who used to work as a graphic artist at the government printing office, is still alive.

Gregor Pratt, head of a counterfeiting ring, has been pressuring Vera to cooperate with him for some time. Pratt is holding Vera's 65-year-old father captive, forcing him to help make the fake dollar bills. The gang also includes Browski. He is the man who shot Groß, a gang member who wanted out, on the radio tower. Roberts quickly realizes that Vera has not told him the whole truth and confronts her with his findings. Things soon come to a head. A trail leads Roberts to the Humboldthafen port, where the American is attacked and knocked out by Martin and Browski. Eventually he ends up in the water, wakes up in a convalescent home apparently in East Berlin and is questioned by a Soviet interpreter named Tamara on behalf of her superior, Soviet Major Sirotkin. Berlin police have now determined that the dollar bills that have appeared in large numbers are counterfeits. As a result, the American occupation forces in Berlin pricked up their ears, and Kriminalrat Wengen has joined forces with his US and British colleagues, Harris and Lonergan, respectively.

Law enforcement is closing in on the criminal gang, with high-speed chases occurring all over West Berlin. Roberts and Vera are now caught between the fronts, and Pratt, now claiming to be in love with Vera, has made her his prisoner. The gangsters have set up their workshop in an inconspicuous location below the ruined Reichstag building right on the front line between the western and eastern sectors. Roberts, with a head injury, shows up to rescue Vera and her father, Karl Dornbrink. Pratt drags Vera away, pursued by Roberts. Berlin police arrive to raid the gangsters' workshop, leading to a gunfight and culminating in Pratt's death.

== Cast ==
- Gordon Howard as Ronald Roberts / Claude Norbert in the French version
- Irina Garden as Vera Dornbrink
- Kurt Meisel as Gregor Pratt
- Hans Nielsen as Kriminalrat Dr. Wangen
- Wolfgang Neuss as Martin
- Ernst Konstantin as Major Sirotkin
- Barbara Rütting as Tamara, Dolmetscherin
- Paul Bildt as Karl Dornbrink
- Heinz Engelmann as Kommissar Max Lüdecke
- Heinz Giese as Richard Browski
- Herbert Kiper as Kommissar Kretschmer
- Klaus Miedel as Vernon, Interpol-Delegierter
- Werner Schöne
- Rudi Stöhr
- Walter Bechmann
- Walter Tarrach as Werner, Zeuge
- Heinz Oskar Wuttig as Kriminaldezernent Lonergan
- Willi Braunsdorf as Groß, Fälscher
- Ruth Nimbach
- Harro ten Brook as Kriminaldzernent Harris
- Eric Schildkraut
- Joe Furtner
- Rolf Heydel as Kriminalkommissar Bludau
- Josef Kamper as Kröger, Fälscher
- Peter Lehmbrock as Wittels, Fälscher
- Horst Buchholz as Junger Mann am Funkturm
- Günter Pfitzmann as Polizist in Funkzentrale

== Bibliography ==
- Baer, Hester. Dismantling the Dream Factory: Gender, German Cinema, and the Postwar Quest for a New Film Language. Berghahn Books, 2012.
