= Kekec (film) =

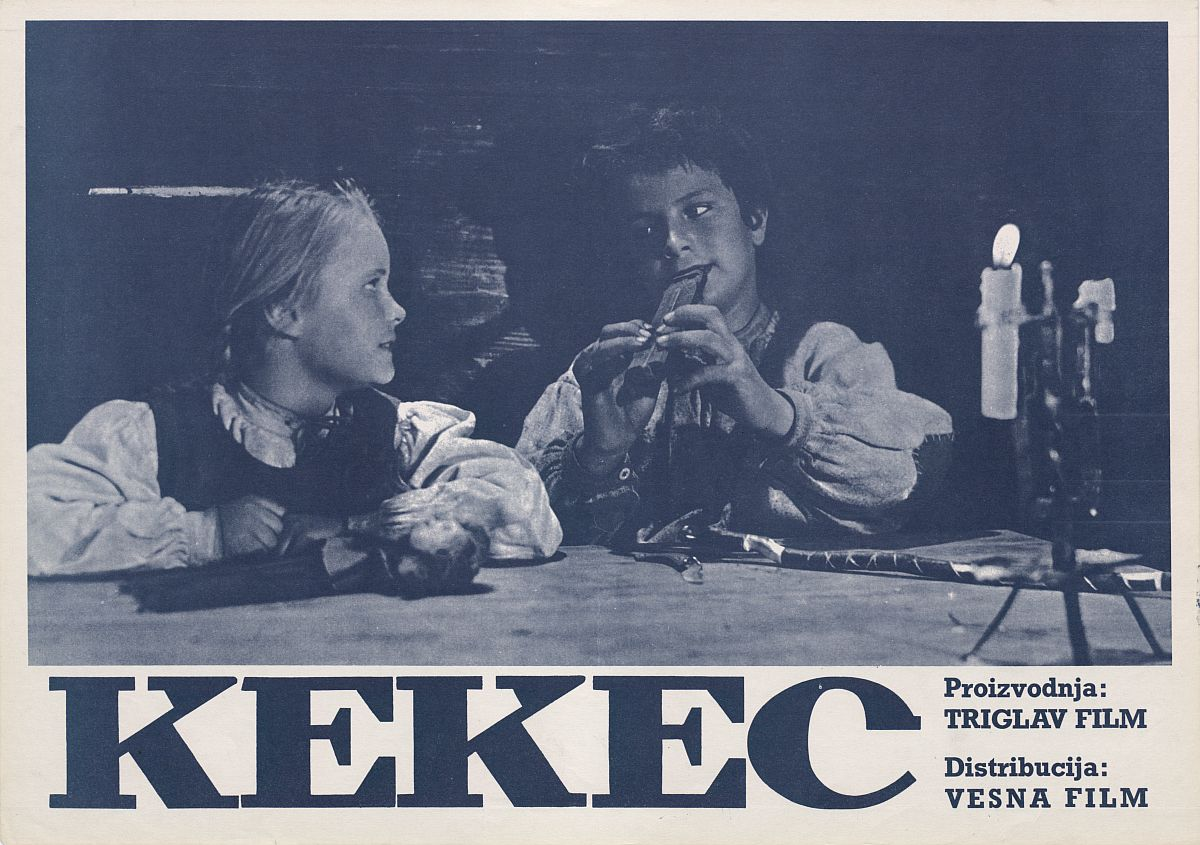
- Directed by: Jože Gale
- Screenplay by: Jože Gale; Frane Milčinski
- Based on: Kekec Above the Lonely Abyss by Josip Vandot
- Produced by: Dušan Povh
- Starring: Matija Barl; Frane Milčinski; France Presetnik; Zdenka Logar; Jože Mlakar
- Cinematography: Ivan Marinček
- Edited by: Ivan Marinček
- Music by: Marjan Kozina
- Production company: Triglav Film
- Distributed by: Vesna film (original); Viba film (current)
- Release date: 18 December 1951 (Yugoslavia)
- Running time: 97 minutes
- Countries: Slovenia; Yugoslavia
- Language: Yugoslavian

Kekec is a 1951 Slovene/Yugoslavian adventure-youth film directed by Jože Gale. It is based on mountain narrative Kekec Above the Lonely Abyss (Kekec nad samotnim breznom), by Josip Vandot, the last of three stories about Kekec, published in Slovenian youth magazine Zvonček in 1924. The film was produced by Triglav Film and originally distributed by Vesna film, now Viba film. It is set in the northwest part of the Slovenian mountains, mainly in the author's birthplace, Kranjska Gora, and the Julian Alps.

This is the first in the Jože Gale film series about Kekec and has two sequels: Good Luck, Kekec (Srečno, Kekec!) from 1963 and Kekec's Tricks (Kekčeve ukane) from 1968.

More than a thousand children auditioned for casting director Ernest Adamič.

== Plot summary ==
Based on the popular story "Kekec nad samotnim breznom" ("Kekec Above the Lonely Abyss", 1924) by Josip Vandot, the story is close to the original, with added songs and background music. It is set in an idyllic village of the Slovenian mountains where Kekec (Matija Barl), where a young boy lives.

High in the mountains, Bedanec (France Presetnik) leads his solitary life as a widely feared and wicked man. The brave boy Kekec is not afraid of him. When he learns Bedanec victimizes Mojca (Zdenka Logar) and Kosobrin (Frane Milčinski) in his house, Kekec sets out to find them. With his courage and cunning, he sets them free and forces Bedanec to leave for good.

== Reception ==
This is the most popular and successful film in Kekec's film trilogy. It was the first Slovenian film to win an international award, at the 13th Venice International Film Festival in 1952, a Golden Lion recognizing it as the best film for kids aged 11 to 14. It possibly screened at festivals and cinemas in over 60 countries, such as China, where it was part of 1957's Yugoslavian film week.

== Cast ==
Actor	Character	Description
Matija Barl	Kekec	A fearless boy and the story's main character. The character had enormous impact in Slovenian pop culture.
Frane Milčinski	Kosobrin	A tiny and modest old man with long white beard and hat who is gathering herbs.
France Presetnik	Bedanec	Scary and evil wild poacher with long black beard from the mountains.
Zdenka Logar	Mojca	Sister of Rožle, and captured by Bedanec.
Modest Sancin	Mišnjek	
Lojze Potokar	oče	Father of Kekec
Vida Levstik	mati	Mother of Kekec
Alenka Lobnikar	Tinka	
Jože Mlakar	Rožle	Frightened boy, a friend of Kekec and brother of Mojca.
Drago Zupan	night watchman	
Fran Lipah	music spelman	A man who plays a simple instrument.

== Photo gallery ==
=== Shooting locations ===
Slika	Lokacija	Občina	Opis
	Gozd	Tržič	Small village in municipality of Tržič.
	Bedančev konec	Kranjska Gora	The most of the film was shot.
	Savica Fall	Bohinj	Shooting just under Savica Fall.
	Mojstrana	Kranjska Gora	They built a small village set.
	Slemenova špica	Kranjska Gora	Scene with theme song: "Dobra volja je najbolja"
	Saint Josef Church	Ljubljana	Scene of Gorge with stream.

=== Film outtakes ===
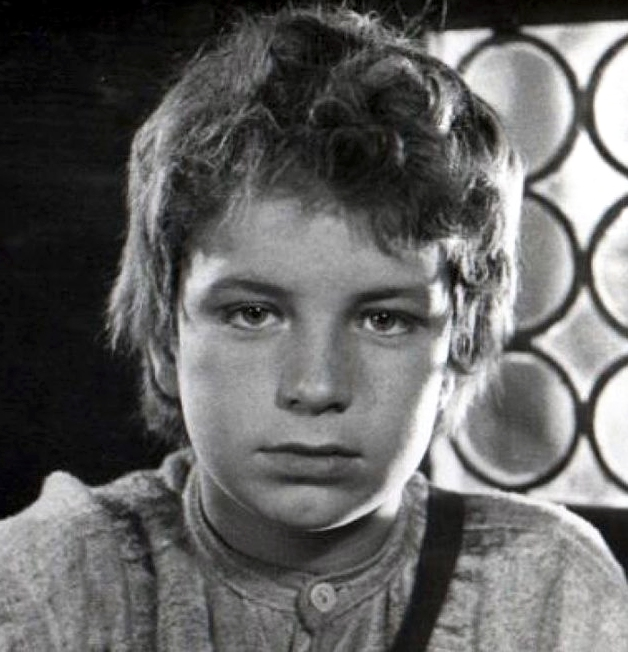
Matija Barl (Kekec)

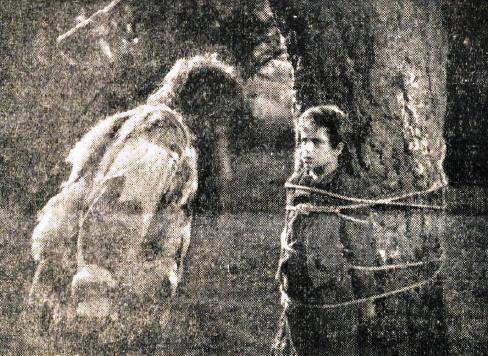
Bedanec and Kekec

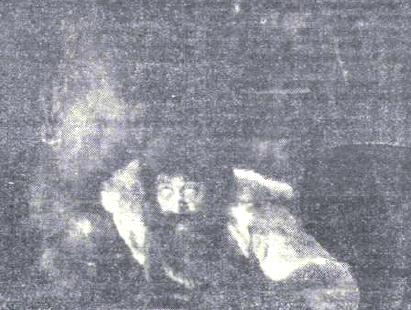
Bedanec

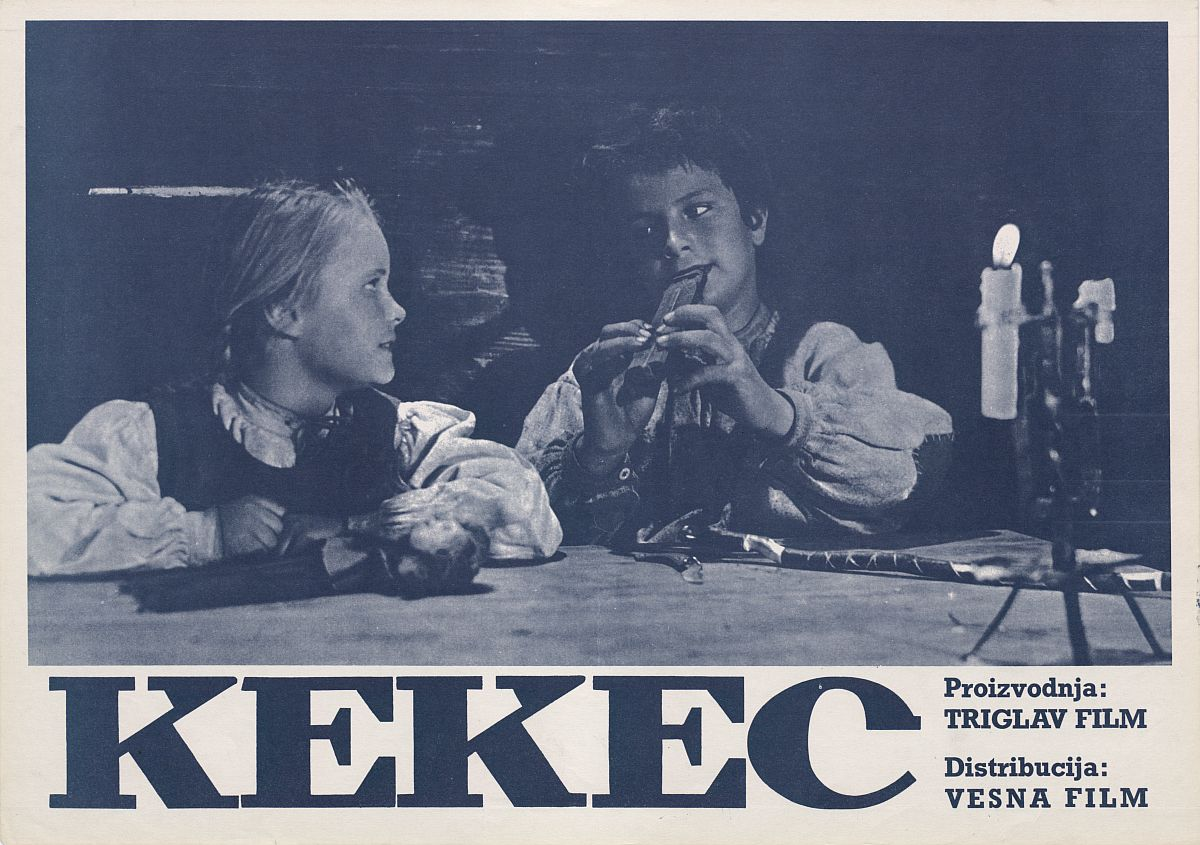
film poster

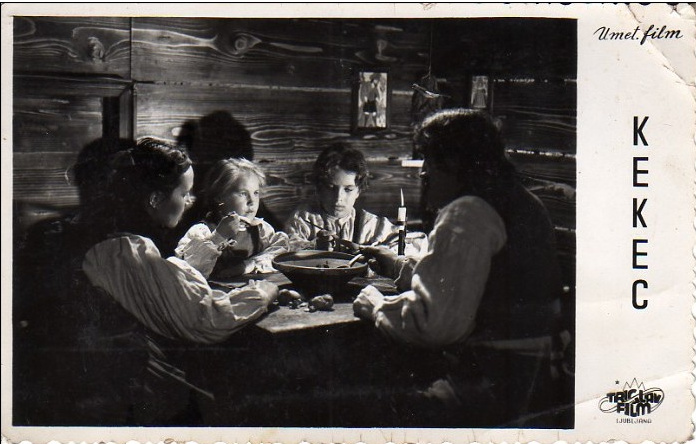
film postcard

== Music ==
The background music and theme tune were written by Slovenian composer Marjan Kozina. Lyrics for the theme song, Kaj mi poje ptičica (Dobra volja je najbolja), were written by Frane Milčinski and performed by Tomaž Tozon with the Slovenian Philharmonic Orchestra.
