= Men Without Wings =

1946 film

- Film poster
- Czech: Muži bez křídel
- Directed by: František Čáp
- Written by: Bohumil Štěpánek
- Starring: Gustav Nezval; Ladislav H. Struna; Jaroslav Zrotal
- Cinematography: Jan Stallich
- Edited by: Jan Kohout
- Music by: Julius Kalaš
- Production company: Československá filmová společnost
- Distributed by: Státní půjčovna filmů
- Release date: 25 October 1946
- Running time: 79 minutes
- Country: Czechoslovakia
- Language: Czech

Men Without Wings (Czech: Muži bez křídel) is a 1946 Czech drama film directed by František Čáp. It was entered into the 1946 Cannes Film Festival, where it was one of the winners of the Grand Prix du Festival International du Film, later known as the Palme d'Or.

== Plot ==
The film takes place in the occupied Republic of Czechoslovakia after the assassination of Schutzstaffel-Obergruppenführer and General der Polizei Reinhard Heydrich, head of the Reich Security Main Office, the combined security services of Nazi Germany, and acting Reichsprotektor of the Protectorate of Bohemia and Moravia. In Prague on 27 May 1942.

Jirka is a boy whose family was murdered in the village of Lidice as repercussions for the assassination of Heydrich. He stays with his uncle, engineer Petr Lom and Marta, a young girl living next door, who works at the post office to help take care of the boy. Lom has just started working on the military airport, governed by Sudeten-Nazi Ullman. Resistance is quite active in the airport, collecting arms and grenades and communicating with allies. They have a lot of great intel thanks to secretary Jana Tomešová, who is Ullman's trustee and has access to a lot of restricted information. Jirka also starts working at the airport, but he is filled with sorrow and in need of revenge. He gets caught stealing a grenade and is arrested by the Gestapo, and later shot. When Jana sees him she faints and Ullman finds a secret message she had with her. He tells his Gestapo friends and goes to the warehouse to investigate where he gets killed by being pushed onto a transformer. The Gestapo start arresting and searching houses of airport workers, revealing that Marta is an informer for the Germans. Lom is not aware of this as he is still struck by Jirka's death. He picks the gun from his hideout and walks back to the airport. After the neighbours tell him the truth about Marta, Lom kills her and helps Jana escape.

Germans gather airport workers and threaten to kill them if no one says who killed Ullman. Then Lom appears saying he did it and kills some Gestapo officers, he is killed by the soldiers.

In the last scene of the film, a dying Lom has a vision of the future. He sees a woman with gun going forward with war atrocities around her. However she does not stop until the war is over and the Czechoslovak flag appears on a mast.

== Cast ==
- Gustav Nezval as Engineer Petr Lom
- Ladislav H. Struna as Chief Engineer Bureš
- Jaroslav Zrotal as Engineer Pavlík
- Vladimír Hlavatý as Engineer Karas
- Jan W. Speerger as Engineer Vondra
- Jaroslav Seník as Zeman
- Ladislav Hájek as Jirka
- Karel Peyr as Director of the airport
- Eduard Linkers as Ullmann
- Jiřina Petrovická as Secretary Jana Tomešová
- Pavla Vrbenská as Post office worker Marta Pohlová
