= Jan Cimbura =

- Directed by: František Čáp
- Written by: Jindřich Šimon Baar (story); František Čáp
- Produced by: Karel Šilhánek
- Starring: Gustav Nezval; Jiřina Štěpničková; Jaroslav Průcha
- Cinematography: Karl Degl
- Edited by: Antonín Zelenka
- Music by: Jiří Fiala
- Production company: Lucernafilm
- Distributed by: Lucernafilm
- Release date: 1941
- Running time: 82 minutes
- Countries: Protectorate of Bohemia and Moravia
- Language: Czech

Jan Cimbura is a 1941 Czech drama film directed by František Čáp and starring Gustav Nezval, Jiřina Štěpničková and Jaroslav Průcha.

== Main cast ==
- Gustav Nezval as Jan Cimbura
- Jiřina Štěpničková as Marjánka
- Jaroslav Průcha as Farmer Kovanda
- Marie Brožová as Rozárka Kovandová
- Vilém Pfeiffer as Josef Piska
- Vladimír Šmeral as Bartík, the troublemaker
- František Roland
- Otýlie Benísková
- Eva Svobodová as Anýzka, the mad woman
- Stanislava Strobachová as Barča, bar girl
- Rudolf Deyl as Jíra
- Theodor Pištěk as Lawyer Miltner
- Bolek Prchal as Bartík's Father
- Ema Kreutzerová as Miltnerová

== Bibliography ==
- Hana Kubátová & Jan Láníček. The Jew in Czech and Slovak Imagination, 1938-89: Antisemitism, the Holocaust, and Zionism. BRILL, 2018.
