= Vrtičkarji =

2000 Slovenian comedy television series

- Genre: Light comedy
- Written by: Andrej Rozman; Jure Pervanje
- Directed by: Jure Pervanje
- Country of origin: Slovenia
- Original language: Slovenian

Vrtičkarji (Allotment holders) was a 2000 Slovenian comedy television series.

The series was written by Andrej Rozman and Jure Pervanje. It was produced by Radiotelevizija Slovenija. It starred Brane Grubar, Miha Arh, Barbara Lapajne, Jernej Šugman, Maša Derganc, Gojmir Lešnjak, Jette Vejrup Ostan and Boris Ostan. Jernej Šugman won the Viktor Award for best TV role in Vrtičkarji (2000). Vrtickarji was intended to be not so much a sitcom as a light comedy that portrayed what it is to be Slovenian. Co-writer Andrej Rozman was disappointed by the low-budget production. Rozman wrote the scripts for the first thirteen episodes, then left the project.
