= Kekec's Tricks =

Kekec's Tricks (Kekčeve ukane)
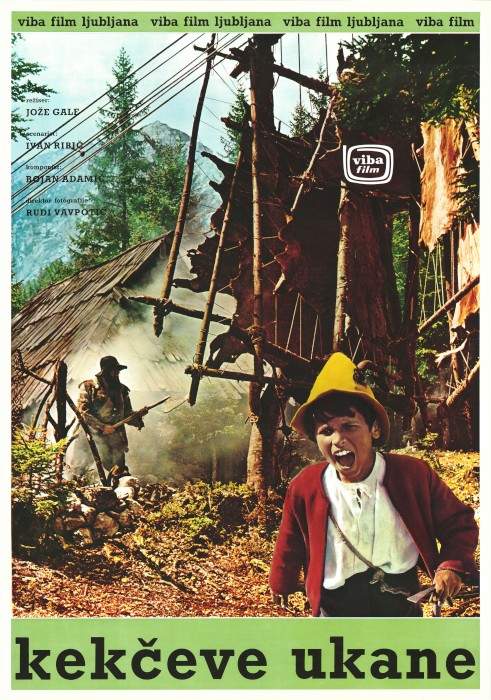
- Directed by: Jože Gale
- Screenplay by: Ivan Ribič; Jože Gale (adaptation)
- Based on: Kekec mountain narratives by Josip Vandot
- Produced by: Ljubo Struna
- Starring: Zlatko Krasnič; Polde Bibič; Boris Ivanovski; Jasna Krofak; Fanika Podobnikar
- Cinematography: Rudi Vaupotič
- Edited by: Darinka Peršin
- Music by: Bojan Adamič
- Production company: Viba film
- Distributed by: Vesna film (original); Viba film (current)
- Release date: 23 December 1968
- Running time: 78 minutes
- Countries: Slovenia; Yugoslavia
- Language: Slovene

Kekec's Tricks (Slovene: Kekčeve ukane) is a 1968 Yugoslav Slovene-language adventure film directed by Jože Gale. The film is based on the Kekec mountain narratives by Josip Vandot, originally published in Slovenian youth magazine Zvonček. It was produced by Viba film and distributed originally by Vesna film and later Viba film.

This is the last of three in the Jože Gale film series about Kekec and has two previous parts: Kekec from 1951 and Good Luck, Kekec (Srečno, Kekec!) from 1963.

== Plot ==
The evil poacher Bedanec, a character from the previous instalments, appears again. Kekec and his friends chase and hunt Bedanec again and drive him away. Nevertheless, Bedanec catches Brincelj and Rožle. The brave Kekec saves both of them with the help of his wisdom and tricks Bedanec, who gets caught in one of his own traps he set.

Kekec saves Bedanec out of the trap because he politely asks him, but Bedanec doesn't learn anything out of this. A wise man, Vitranc, wants to bring peace to these places.

== Cast ==
Actor	Character
Zlatko Krasnič	Kekec
Polde Bibič	Bedanec
Boris Ivanovski	Rožle
Jasna Krofak	Mojca
Fanika Podobnikar	Tinkara
Milorad Radovič	Brincelj
Jože Zupan	Vitranc

== Music ==
The whole music including theme was composed by the Slovenian composer Bojan Adamič. Lyrics for theme song called "Kekčeva pesem" were written by Kajetan Kovič and performed by Slovenian Philharmonic Orchestra.

== Reception ==
The importance of the bucolic setting of the Julian Alps was noted.

== Awards ==
The film received the Golden Arena for the Best Production Design at the Pula Film Festival in 1969.

== Legacy ==
The film was screened in Šenčur in 2025. A grade-IX climbing route in the Kamnik-Savinja Alps was named after the film. The film was restored in 2016 by the Slovenian Archives.
