= Josip Vandot =

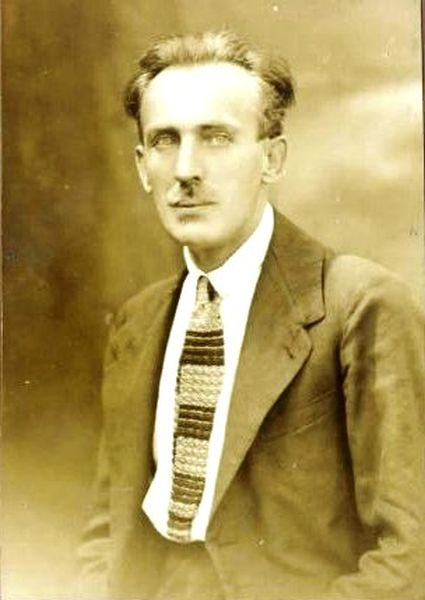
- Born: 15 January 1884; Kranjska Gora, Carniola, Austria-Hungary
- Died: 11 July 1944 (aged 60); Trnjanski Kuti, Independent State of Croatia
- Occupations: Writer, poet

Josip Vandot (15 January 1884 – 11 July 1944) was a Slovene writer and poet who wrote mainly for young readers.

== Biography ==
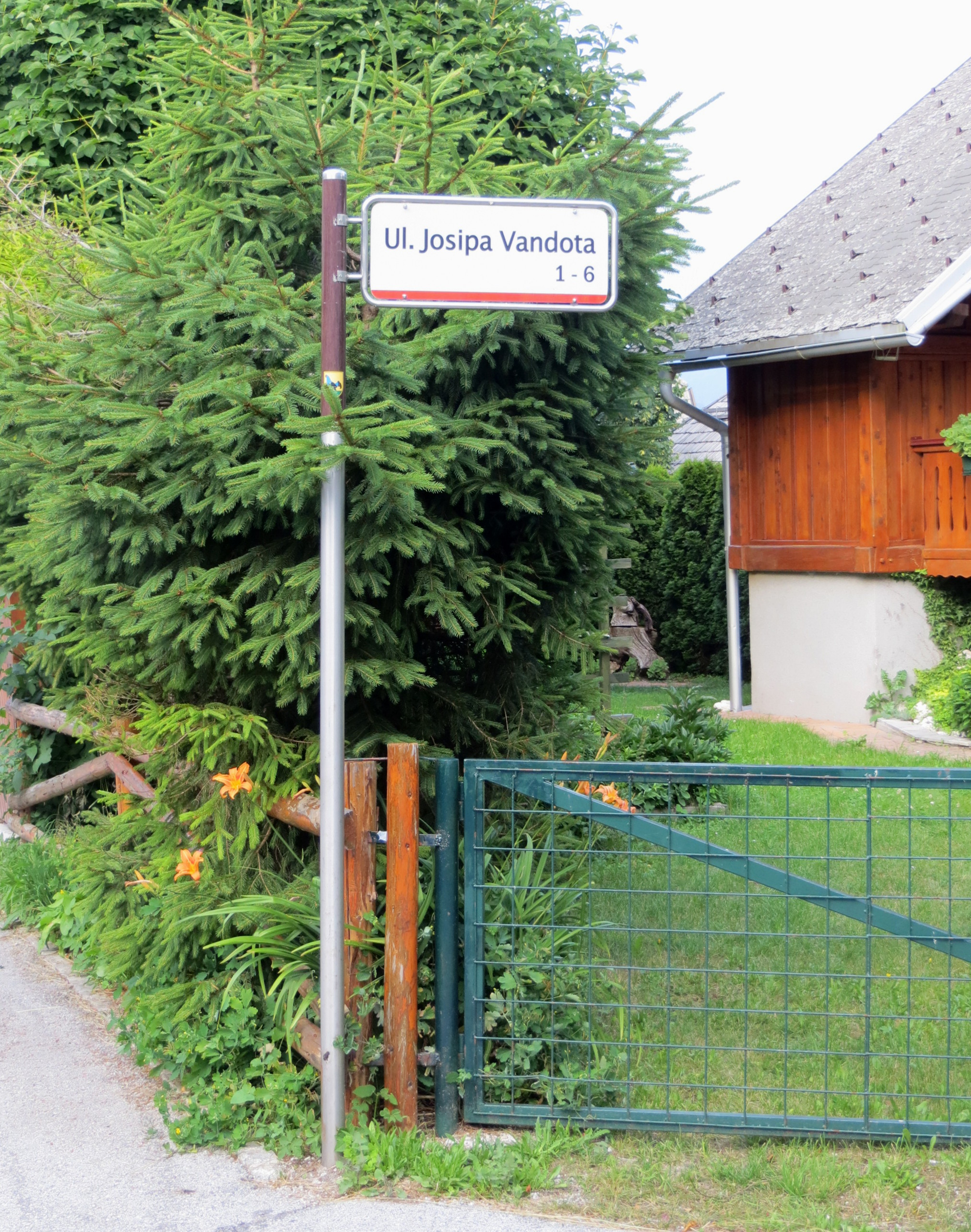
Josip Vandot Street, Kranjska Gora

Vandot was born in Kranjska Gora in Upper Carniola, then part of Austria-Hungary, now in Slovenia. Under the interwar Kingdom of Yugoslavia, he was employed as a railway official in Maribor. In 1941, after the area was annexed by Germany, Vandot was deported to Croatia. He was killed in the Allied bombing of Slavonski Brod in 1944. A street is now named for him in Kranjska Gora.

== Work ==
Vandot is best known for the creation of the character Kekec, a brave and clever shepherd boy from the highlands of his home region, the Karawanks and Julian Alps. He wrote three books with Kekec as the main character:

- Kekec na hudi poti (Kekec on the Hard Path, 1918)
- Kekec na volčji sledi (Kekec on the Wolf Trail, 1922)
- Kekec nad samotnim breznom (Kekec Above the Lonely Abyss, 1924)

The Kekec books were adapted into three films about the character, although only the first was a direct adaptation of the first book:

- Kekec (1951)
- Srečno, Kekec (1963) (Good Luck, Kekec) – the first Slovene colour film
- Kekčeve ukane (1968) (Kekec's Wiles)
