= Schwarz und weiß wie Tage und Nächte =

- Written by: Karl Heinz Willschrei; Jochen Wedegärtner; Wolfgang Petersen
- Directed by: Wolfgang Petersen
- Starring: Bruno Ganz; René Deltgen; Gila von Weitershausen; Ljuba Tadić
- Music by: Klaus Doldinger
- Country of origin: Germany
- Original language: German

Production
- Producer: Georg Althammer
- Cinematography: Jörg-Michael Baldenius
- Editor: Johannes Nikel
- Running time: 103 minutes
- Production companies: Westdeutscher Rundfunk; Österreichischer Rundfunk; Monaco Film; Radiant Film

Original release
- Release: 13 September 1978

Schwarz und weiß wie Tage und Nächte (Black and White Like Day and Night) is a West German film from 1978 directed by Wolfgang Petersen and starring Bruno Ganz.

== Plot ==
Thomas Rosemund, a scientist who swore off playing chess after a nervous breakdown as a young wunderkind, creates an undefeated chess program. However, the Russian world champ beats the program in a televised match. The West German mathematician becomes a top chess pro himself, which the West German media boast will prove the superiority of Germany and democracy. Rosemund believes that the entire Red Communist bloc is out to stop him from vanquishing their own Stefan Koruga, to become the next Bobby Fischer and a symbol that capitalism is preferable to socialism.

== Critical reception ==
John Simon called Black and White Like Day and Night "the best film ever about chess".
