= Jana Milčinski =

Slovenian writer and translator

- Born: 5 December 1920; Ljubljana, Slovenia
- Died: 13 April 2007 (aged 86); Ljubljana, Slovenia
- Occupations: Writer, journalist and translator
- Writing career
- Notable awards: Levstik Award; 1986 for Lukec dobi sestrico

Jana Milčinski (born Jana Podkrajšek; 5 December 1920 – 13 April 2007) was a Slovene writer, journalist and translator.

She won the Levstik Award in 1986 for her popular science book Lukec dobi sestrico (Lukec Gets a Sister). She wrote a number of other stories and children's books, many with themes from the Second World War in Yugoslavia.

She was married to the poet and satirist Frane Milčinski Ježek.

== Selected works ==
- Pravljice za danes in jutri (Stories for today and Tomorrow), 1992
- To si ti, Nina (That Is You, Nina), 1988
- Danes, ko postajam pionir, pionirka (Today As I Become a Pioneer), 1988
- Matiček in Maja včeraj, danes, jutri in vsak dan (Matiček and Maja Yesterday, Today, Tomorrow and Every Day), 1986
- Lukec dobi sestrico (Lukec Gets a Sister), 1986
- Pisane zgodbe (Diverse Tales), 1976
- Zakaj sta Matiček in Maja zamudila pouk (Why Matiček and Maja Missed Class), 1972
