= Fran Milčinski =

Slovene lawyer & writer (1867–1932)

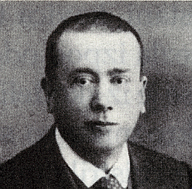
- Born: 3 December 1867 Lož, Duchy of Carniola, Austria-Hungary
- Died: 24 October 1932 (aged 64) Ljubljana, Drava Banovina, Kingdom of Yugoslavia
- Occupation: Lawyer, writer, playwright

Fran Milčinski (3 December 1867 – 24 October 1932), also known by the pen name Fridolin Žolna, was a Slovene lawyer, writer and playwright.

== Life ==
Fran Milčinski was born in Lož, a town in Inner Carniola, which was then part of Austria-Hungary. At four years of age, he and his family moved to Ljubljana, where he attended primary and secondary school. After secondary school, in 1885, he enrolled at the Faculty of Law in Vienna. In 1890 he became a judge. He worked in Ljubljana and acted as a substitute judge in Škofja Loka, Radovljica, Litija, and Brdo. In 1895 he was transferred to Idrija for two years, and returned to Ljubljana afterwards. In 1900 he became the manager of the Provincial Theatre (now the Slovenian National Opera and Ballet Theatre) in Ljubljana, and later worked as a judge and social worker in the juvenile justice system from 1902 onward. He married Marija Krejči in 1910, with whom he had four children; Breda Milčinski Slodnjak (1911–2001), Janez Milčinski (1913–1993), Frane Milčinski (pen name: Ježek, 1914–1988), and Lev Milčinski (1916–2001). He assumed the position of councillor in the Provincial High Court in Ljubljana. Two years later he was nominated for councillor for the Table of the Seven in Zagreb, Croatia. He worked as a lawyer even after retiring in 1925. He made an occasional appearance on Ljubljana's radio as a story teller in 1928. He died in Ljubljana.

== Works ==
Milčinski was a humorist, satirist, young adult fiction writer and playwright. He started writing as a student. He was published by Rogač, Slovenski Narod, and Slovenec. His first humorous sketch stories were published in collections Igračke (1909) and Muhoborci (1912). In these works he ridicules the Slovene petty bourgeoisie and makes fun of bureaucracy, along with the political and cultural situations in which he himself grew up. His books Tolovaj Mataj and Ptički brez gnezda were published in 1917, and Gospodična Mici in 1930 in which he remarks upon the misconducts in family education, and warns about child neglect. Between wars he published humorous and satirical stories under the alias Fridolin Žolna. In these satirical sketch stories he describes actual events. His most famous collection of humorous stories is Butalci (1949); the stories were published posthumously in the monthly magazine Žika, the youth paper Naš rod and in the storybook Tolovaj Mataj. Many of his works were published posthumously (Zgodbe skavta Petra, Humoreske in groteske).

He wrote numerous fantasy short stories, in which he took on the ancient story motive of the Slovene folk song (Pravljice (1911), Tolovaj Mataj in druge slovenske pravljice (1917)). Besides those, he also wrote plays (Brat sokol, Cigani, Kjer ljubezen, tam Bog, Krapn mlajši). The plays Volkašin (1913) and Mogočni prstan's (1923) target audience was primarily the youth. In Življenjepis mojega peresa ("Biography of My Quill") Milčinski wrote that he drew inspiration from his favorite writers such as Dostoyevsky, Dickens and Twain. Although Milčinski was born in a time of naturalism and realism, he was active during the early 20th century Slovenian contemporary period as well. Either way, he cannot be marked as an archetypical representative of either literary genre. The genre title that suits him best is a humorist writer.

== Bibliography ==
- Milčinski, Fran; Vahen, Gorazd (2004). Twinkle Sleepyhead. Sanje. ISBN 961-6387-48-0.
- Milčinski, Fran; Leban Ksenija (2009). Little Sleepy Star. Sanje. ISBN 978-961-6767-42-2.
- Multiple authors (2002). Slovenian Folk Tales. Ljubljana, Mladniska knjiga. ISBN 861116248X.

== Sources ==
- France Koblar: Milčinski, Fran (1867–1932). Slovenska biografija, s. v.
