= Frane Milčinski =

Slovene poet & satirist (1914–1988)

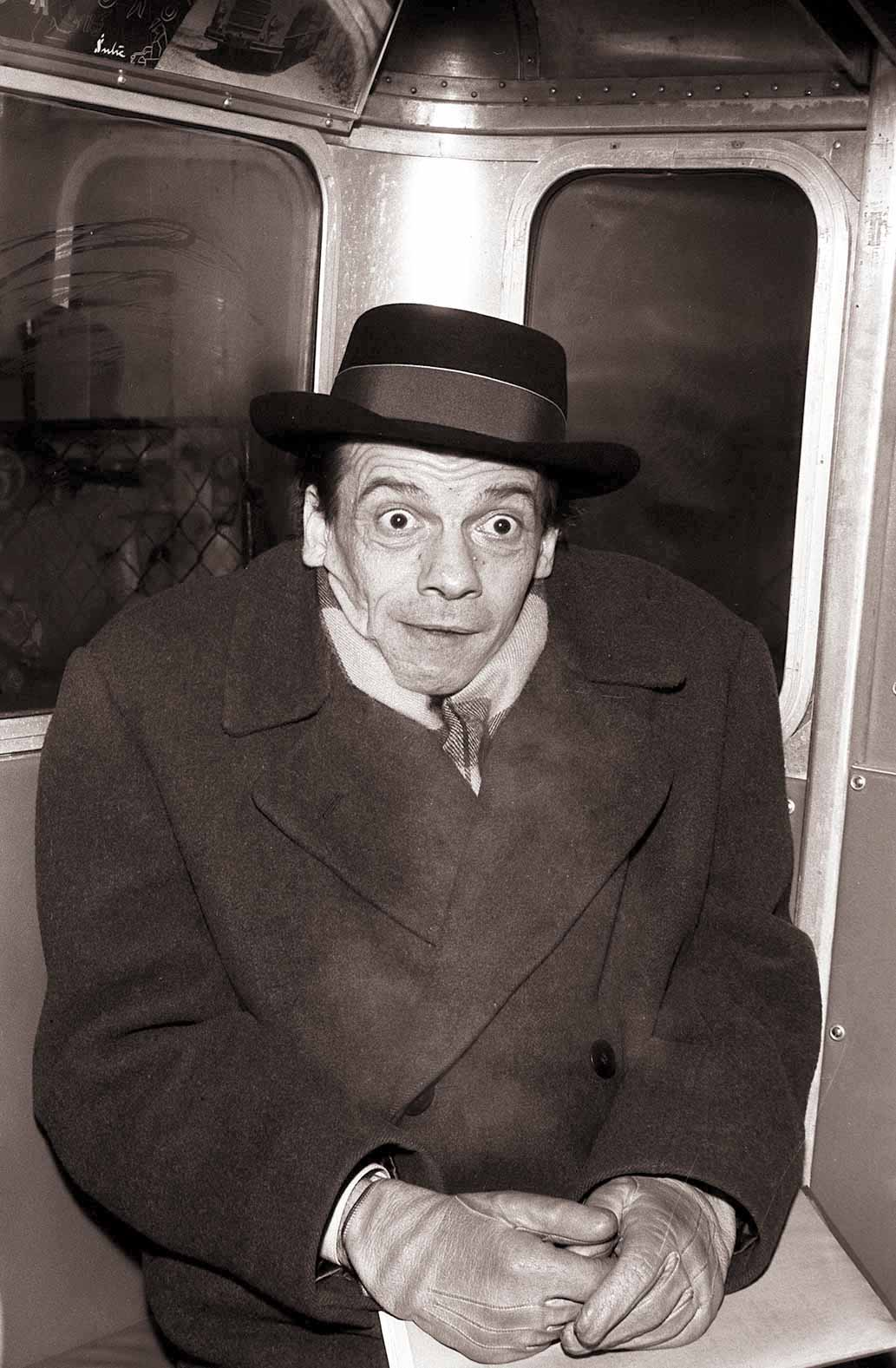
- Born: 14 December 1914; Ljubljana, Austria-Hungary (now in Slovenia)
- Died: 26 February 1988 (aged 73); Ljubljana, Socialist Federal Republic of Yugoslavia (now in Slovenia)
- Occupations: poet, satirist, humorist, actor, children's writer and director
- Writing career
- Notable awards: Levstik Award; 1959 for Zvezdica Zaspanka; Prešeren Award; 1975 for lifetime achievement in radio, television, film and literature

Frane Milčinski (pen name Ježek; 14 December 1914 – 26 February 1988) was a Slovene poet, satirist, humorist and comedian, actor, children's writer, and director. He is considered one of Slovenia's foremost 20th-century satirists and entertainers.

== Life ==
Milčinski was born in Ljubljana in 1914 as the third child of the writer and judge Fran Milčinski. During World War II he was interned at the Gonars concentration camp. He was married to the writer and journalist Jana Milčinski.

== Work ==
He worked in the theatre and radio from an early age.

== Awards ==
Throughout his career, Milčinski won numerous awards. The 1951 film Kekec, for which he co-wrote the screenplay and theme song "Dobra volja je najbolja," won the first international award for a Slovene feature film when it won a Golden Lion in the children's film category at the Venice Film Festival in 1952.

Milčinski also won the Levstik Award in 1959 for his story Zvezdica Zaspanka (The Sleepy Little Star). In 1975 he won the Grand Prešeren Award for lifetime achievement in radio, television, film, and literature.

== Legacy ==
The Ježek Award for creative achievement in radio and television is named after him; it has been bestowed annually since 1989 by Slovenia's national public broadcasting organization, Radiotelevizija Slovenija.

== Selected prose ==
- 13 in ena: humoreske Franeta Milčinskega – Ježka (13 and One: Humorous Stories by Frane Milčinski, a.k.a. Ježek, 1951)
- Zvezdica Zaspanka (The Sleepy Little Star, 1959)
- Legenda o birokratu (A Legend about a Bureaucrat, 1961)
- Desetnica in druge pravljice (The Tenth Daughter and Other Tales, 1964)
- Govoreči bankovec: antologija slovenske humoristične proze (The Talking Banknote: An Anthology of Slovene Humorous Prose, 1976)
- Preprosta ljubezen (Simple Love, 1987)
- Ta svet je pesmi vreden (This World Is Worthy of a Song, 1988)
- Humoreske (Humorous Stories, 1998)
- 13 + 8 humoresk (13 + 8 Humorous Stories, 2003)

== Screenplays ==
- Kekec (1951)
- Svet na Kajžarju (1952)
- Vesna (1953)
- The Beginning Was Sin (1954)
- Ne čakaj na maj (1957)
- Dobri stari pianino (1959)
- Zvezdica Zaspanka (1965)
