= Vida Juvan =

Slovenian actress

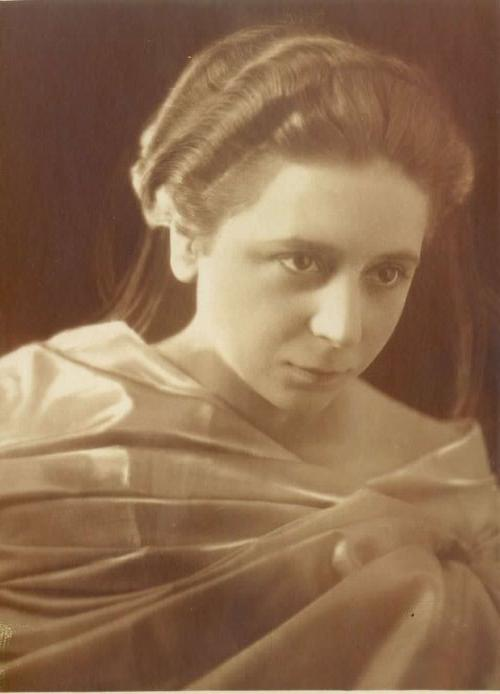
Vida Juvan

Vida Juvan (17 June 1905 – 4 October 1998) was a Slovenian actress who won the Prešeren Award in 1971. In the United States she might be best known for a role in the horror film Cave of the Living Dead.
