= František Čáp =

Czech film director (1913–1972)

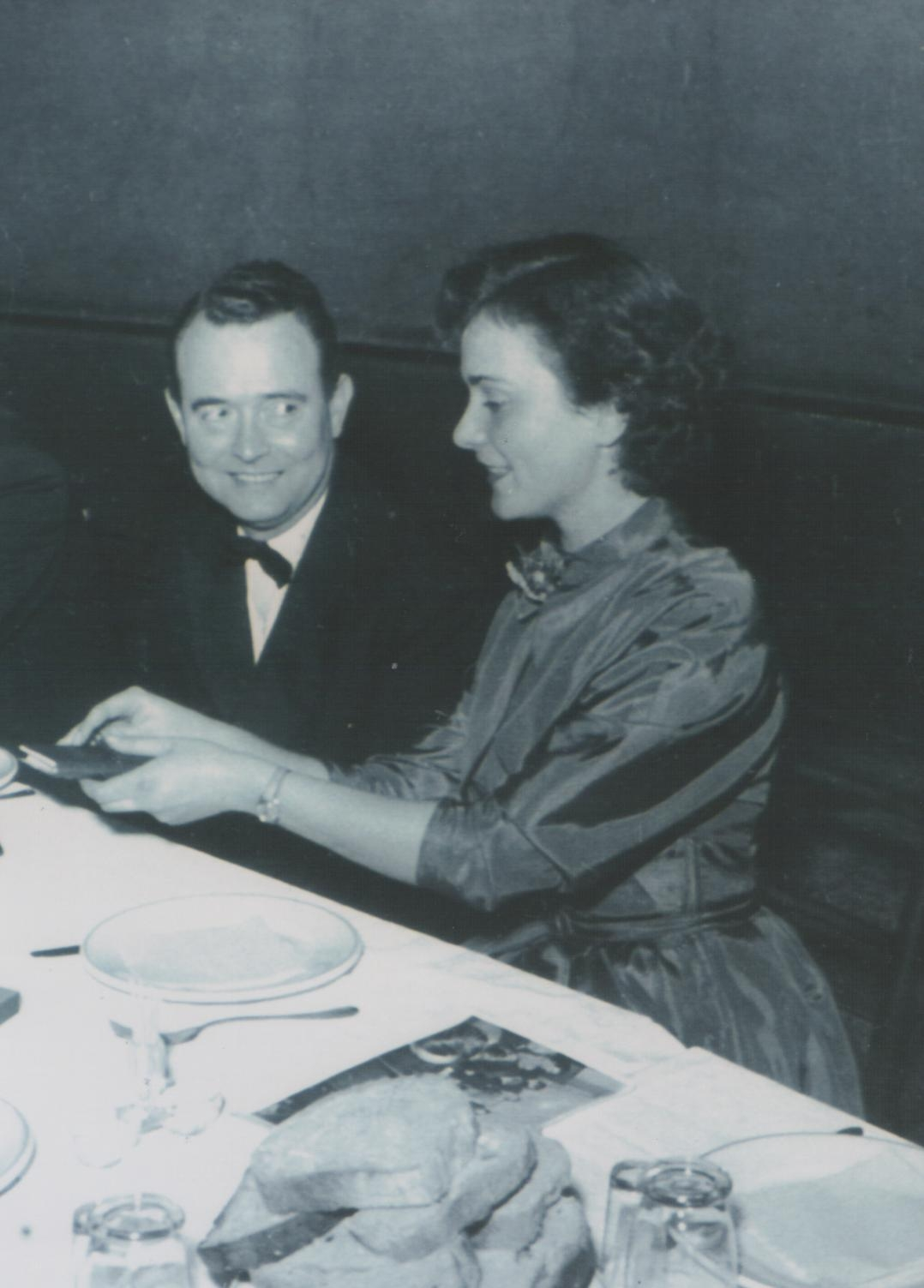
- Čáp with Metka Gabrijelčič in 1953 at the premiere of Vesna in Belgrade
- Born: 7 December 1913; Čachovice, Bohemia, Austria-Hungary
- Died: 12 January 1972 (aged 58); Ankaran, SR Slovenia, SFR Yugoslavia
- Occupations: Film director Screenwriter
- Years active: 1937–1948 (Czechoslovakia); 1950–1970 (West Germany); 1953–1965 (Yugoslavia)

František Čáp (7 December 1913 – 12 January 1972), also known as Franz Cap in Germany, was a Czech film director and screenwriter, who was also active in Germany and Yugoslavia. He directed 32 films between 1939 and 1970. Having created Slovene film classics such as Vesna, Ne čakaj na maj, and Naš avto, he was also one of the most popular directors of early Slovene cinema in the 1950s and 1960s.

== Life ==
Čáp was born in Čachovice (now in the central Czech Republic). As an already established professional, he moved to Ljubljana in 1952, following an invitation by Branimir Tuma, the director of Triglav Film. In 1957, he moved to Portorož, a coastal town in southwestern Slovenia, where he lived until his death.

== Work ==
Prior to his arrival in Yugoslavia, Čáp was praised as the young star of Czech cinema. During World War II he directed a dozen light romantic dramas and melodramas, among them the internationally acclaimed Nocturnal Butterfly, which won a prize at the Venice film festival, and Men Without Wings, which won a prize for best director in Cannes. His last Czechoslovak film, The White Darkness, his personal favorite, put him in conflict with the communist authorities. After the criticism his film received by a workers' jury at the Zlín film festival, Čáp called the jury "morons who don't understand [his] films". This did not go well in communist Czechoslovakia, and he was banned from directing movies. He fled to West Germany, where he directed three films, including All Clues Lead to Berlin, which was distributed in many countries. He arrived in Yugoslavia by invitation of Branimir Tuma, the director of a Slovene film production company, to help develop the Slovene film industry in the 1950s.

In the 1950s and 1960s, Čap directed five films for Triglav film and another six coproductions and non-Slovene productions. Čáp's first Yugoslav film, the romantic comedy Vesna (1953), had elements of Heimatfilm and pre–World War II Czech and Austrian melodrama, and it proved highly successful both artistically and commercially, as did its sequel Ne čakaj na maj (1957). Vesna remains one of the most popular Slovene classics. It took the place of the first commercial film—and the first comedy—in Slovene cinema, and was precisely the urban, modern, and technically exquisite film that Triglav film had hoped for when it employed Čap.

Čap's second Slovene film was the war drama Trenutki odločitve (Moments of Decision, 1955) about the urgency of reconciliation between the Partisans and Anti-Communist Volunteer Militia, a topic with which he produced the first censored film in Slovenia.

During his "Yugoslav era", Čap engaged not only in Slovene productions, but also in various other acclaimed productions and coproductions. He directed Am Anfang war es Sünde (Sin / Greh, 1954, Saphir Film) and the romantic drama La ragazza della salina (Sand, Love and Salt / Kruh in sol, 1957), which featured Marcello Mastroianni. For Bosna film, he directed a drama about juvenile delinquency, Vrata ostaju otvorena (The Door Remains Open, 1959), introducing Milena Dravić, one of the leading film stars in Yugoslavia, in her very first film role, and another comedy, Srešćemo se večeras (Meet You Tonight, 1962).

In 1956, Čáp shot Die Geierwally (The Vulture Wally), based on the novel by Wilhelmine von Hillern, in Germany, while X-25 javlja ("X-25 Reports", 1960), a World War II spy thriller set in Zagreb, saw extensive international theatrical release as well. However, after his poorly received comedy Naš avto (Our Car, 1962), Čáp was unable to find work in Yugoslavia and he turned to direct for television. He was engaged in directing a TV series and two TV films for German and Austrian televisions. In Slovenia where he lived, though, he was only able to participate in one more production, directing a short film Piran (1965).

== Criticism and reception ==
Contemporary Slovene film criticism widely accepts that the five films that František Čáp directed in Slovene—Vesna, Trenutki odločitve, Ne čakaj na maj, X 25 Reports, and Our Car—introduced a Hollywood type of narrative and cosmopolitan appearance to 1950s Slovene cinema. Though struggling with negative criticism in his own time, today Čáp is praised as a craftsman that helped the undeveloped Slovene and Yugoslav cinema—at the time infected with dilettante technical standards, problematic focus on local issues and stiff literary adaptations—to rise to the level of an exquisite craft with universal intelligibility.

Some critics viewed it as "genre cinema"—because Čáp mostly directed comedies, thrillers, and melodramas—although these do not correspond strictly to genre rules. "Mainstream cinema" is a term that more accurately describes its aim to attract the audience by means of a classical, easily intelligible narrative, and by emphasizing the story and dramatic structure, not so much qualities of cinema as an art form.

The negative reviews of Čáp's work occurred mostly during Yugoslav film criticism of the 1960s, 1970s, and 1980s. Orthodox communist reviewers saw in it a bourgeois threat to socialist values and a conservative return to the middle-class phantom concepts (e.g., the idea of innocent romantic love). They also minded Čáp's comedies' prevailing themes of spoiled youth and their sexual awakening in Vesna and Ne čakaj na maj.

The name object of early criticism, however, was the misrepresentation (or lack of representation) of Slovene culture in Čáp's cinema, especially in the hugely popular comedies. A number of reviewers saw Čáp as a foreigner that had never assimilated to Slovene culture. They resented that the films were not specific enough and could be set anywhere in central Europe. These reviews seem traditionalist and xenophobic from contemporary point of view. Contemporary Slovene film theorists have largely praised Čáp's "foreignness" or "otherness", reasoning that his ignorance for regional values and conflicts has actually helped him to maintain the necessary objective distance and his particular sense of film direction and storytelling.

=== Čáp and Slovene ===
Contrary to complaints regarding the generic nature of the films, it is well recognized that Čáp contributed drastically to the adaptation of Slovene for cinematic use. The dialogues were fluent and had substance, there was plenty of wordplays, verbal comedy, urban slang and authentic regional accents. The dialogues from Čap's comedies came into general usage and became items of universal joking across generations and nation. Whereas Slovene in pre-Čap cinema had not functioned well, Čáp invented a slang liberated from constraints of purism and theatricality. Thus the director, while being attacked for directing un-Slovene films by many reviewers, in fact enriched Slovene language and culture.

== Selected filmography ==
- A Step into the Darkness (Czech: Krok do tmy) (1937) - screenwriter only
- Virginity (Czech: Panenství) (1937) - screenwriter only
- Fiery Summer (Czech: Ohnivé léto) (1939)
- Grandmother (Czech: Babička) (1940)
- Jan Cimbura (1941)
- Nocturnal Butterfly (Czech: Noční motýl) (1941)
- The Dancer (1943)
- Mist on the Moors (Czech: Mlhy na Blatech) (1944)
- The Girl from Beskydy Mountains (Czech: Děvčica z Beskyd) (1944)
- Men Without Wings (Czech: Muži bez křídel) (1946)
- Sign of the Anchor (Czech: Znamení kotvy) (1947)
- Muzikant (1948)
- White Darkness (1948)
- Crown Jewels (German: Kronjuwelen) (1950)
- All Clues Lead to Berlin (German: Die Spur führt nach Berlin) (1952)
- Vesna (1953)
- The Beginning Was Sin (German: Am Anfang war es Sünde) (1954)
- Moments of Decision (Slovene: Trenutki odločitve) (1955)
- The Vulture Wally (German: Die Geierwally) (1956)
- Don't Whisper (Slovene: Ne čakaj na maj) (1957)
- Sand, Love and Salt (Italian: La ragazza della salina) (1957)
- The Door Remains Open (Serbo-Croatian: Vrata ostaju otvorena) (1957)
- X 25 Reports (Slovene: X 25 javlja) (1960)
- Meet You Tonight (Serbo-Croatian: Srešćemo se večeras) (1962)
- Our Car (Slovene: Naš avto) (1962)
- Mafia – Die ehrenwerte Gesellschaft (1966, TV miniseries)
- Rinaldo Rinaldini (1968–1969, TV series)

== Awards ==
- Nocturnal Butterfly - Targa di segnalazione at 1941 Venice Film Festival
- Men Without Wings - Grand Prix at 1946 Cannes Film Festival
- Vesna - The Critics' Choice Award at the 1954 Pula Film Festival
- Moments of Decision - Big Golden Arena for Best Film at the 1955 Pula Film Festival
