= Stane Sever =

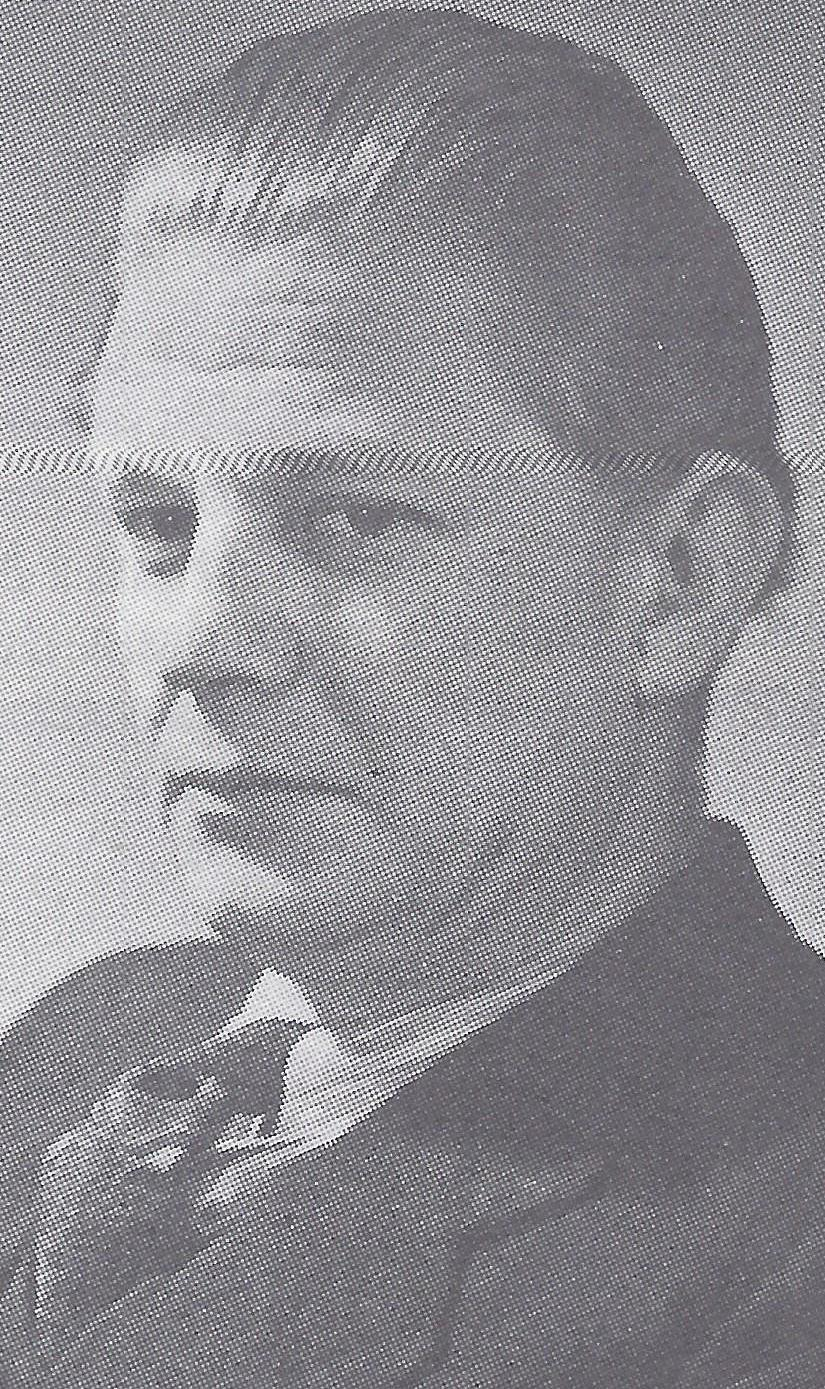
- Born: 20 November 1914; Ljubljana, Austria-Hungary
- Died: 18 December 1970 (aged 56); Ribnica na Pohorju, SFR Yugoslavia
- Occupation: Actor
- Years active: 1947–1969

Stane Sever (20 November 1914 – 18 December 1970) was a Slovenian actor. He appeared in more than twenty films from 1947 to 1969.

== Selected filmography ==
Year	Title	Role	Notes
1967	The Birch Tree		
1963	Mountain of Fear		
1958	H-8		
1957	Ne čakaj na maj		
1955	Let the Sun Shine Again		
1948	On Our Own Land		
