= Memory of the World: National Cinematic Heritage =

UNESCO' audiovisual heritage program

UNESCO's concern for audiovisual heritage within the Memory of the World (MoW) Programme originated the Recommendation for the Safeguarding and Preservation of Moving Images, adopted by the General Conference in October 1980. The recommendation acknowledged the rapid disappearance of film materials, with early cinema particularly affected: by the mid-1990s, more than three-quarters of the earliest film production had been lost. Films from as recently as 1990 required restoration. The document identified three periods of large-scale film loss linked to changes in taste or commercial interest: the destruction of early cinema, the transition from silent to sound film, and the replacement of nitrate stock with acetate base.

To mark the centenary of cinema (1895-1995), UNESCO's General Information Programme and UNISIST compiled Memory of the World: National Cinematic Heritage (CII.95/WS/7, Paris, September 1995). This was the first list published as part of the MoW Programme.

UNESCO contacted national film archives and similar institutions, requesting each to identify approximately fifteen films considered representative of their national cinematic heritage. Responses were received from fifty countries and territories: Angola, Australia, Austria, Bolivia, Brazil, Burkina Faso, Canada, Chile, China, Colombia, Côte d'Ivoire, the Czech Republic, Denmark, Ecuador, Egypt, Ethiopia, Finland, Germany, Greece, the Holy See, Hungary, India, Indonesia, Ireland, Israel, Italy, Kazakhstan, Laos, Lebanon, Mexico, New Zealand, Norway, Pakistan, Papua New Guinea, Peru, Poland, Portugal, Puerto Rico, South Korea, Slovakia, Slovenia, Spain, Sweden, Switzerland, the Former Yugoslav Republic of Macedonia, Ukraine, the United States, Venezuela, and Yugoslavia.

== List of films ==
=== Angola ===
- Quem Faz Correr Quim (1991, Mariano Bartolomeu)
- O Golpe (1977, Francisco Henriques)
- Kimbanda (1978, Rui Duarte)
- Carnaval da Vitória (1978, António Olé)
- Ondylewa / A Festa do Boi Sagrado (1978, Rui Duarte)
- O Ritmo do Ngola Ritmos (1978, António Olé)
- Adeus à Hora da Partida (1979, Francisco Henriques)
- No Caminho das Estrelas (1980, António Olé)
- Conceição Tchiambula (1982, António Olé)
- Nelisita (1982, Rui Duarte)
- Balanço do Tempo na Cena de Angola (1983, Rui Duarte)
- Memória de um Dia (1984, Orlando Fortunato)
- Marabu (1985, Denise Salazar)
- Levanta Voa e Vamos (1986, Asdrubal Rebelo)
- Meus Irmãos Cokwes (1991, Manuel Mariano)

=== Australia ===
- The Story of the Kelly Gang (1906, Charles Tait)
- Home of the Blizzard (1913, Frank Hurley)
- The Sentimental Bloke (1919, Raymond Longford)
- For the Term of His Natural Life (1927, Norman Dawn)
- Dad and Dave Come to Town (1938, Ken G. Hall)
- Forty Thousand Horsemen (1940, Charles Chauvel)
- Kokoda Front Line (1944, Damien Parer)
- The Back of Beyond (1954, John Heyer)
- Jedda (1955, Charles Chauvel)
- Two Thousand Weeks (1969, Tim Burstall)
- Picnic at Hanging Rock (1975, Peter Weir)
- News Front (1978, Phillip Noyce)
- Breaker Morant (1980, Bruce Beresford)
- Mad Max II (1981, George Miller)
- Gallipoli (1981, Peter Weir)
- Strictly Ballroom (1992, Baz Luhrmann)

=== Austria ===
- Sodom und Gomorrha (1922, Michael Kertész)
- Die Stadt ohne Juden (1924, Hans Karl Breslauer)
- Maskerade (1934, Willi Forst)
- Vorstadtvarieté (1934, Werner Hochbaum)
- Der Prozess (1947, G.W. Pabst)
- Der Rabe (1951, Kurt Steinwendner)
- Die letzte Brücke (1953, Helmut Käutner)
- Kassbach (1978, Peter Patzak)
- Geschichten aus dem Wienerwald (1979, Maximilian Schell)
- Der Schüler Gerber (1980, Wolfgang Glück)
- Ein wenig Sterben (1981, Mansur Madavi)
- Raffl (1983, Christian Berger)
- Schmutz (1986, Paulus Manker)
- T4 – Hartheim 1: Sterben und Leben im Schloss (1988, Egon Humer, Andreas Gruber and Johannes Neuhauser)
- Die toten Fische (1989, Michael Synek)
- Weininger's Nacht (1990, Paulus Manker)

=== Bolivia ===
- La Profecía del Lago (1925, José María Velasco Maidana)
- Inauguración del Estadio Hernando Siles (1928, José María Velasco Maidana)
- Wara-Wara (1929, José María Velasco Maidana)
- Hacia la Gloria (1932/33, José Jiménez and Mario Camacho)
- Infierno Verde o la Guerra del Chaco (1933/36, Luis Bazoberry)
- La Campaña del Chaco (1933, José María Velasco Maidana)
- Al Pie del Illimani (1948, EMELCO)
- Vuelve Sebastiana (1953, Jorge Ruiz)
- La Vertiente (1958, Jorge Ruiz)
- Aysa (1965, Jorge Sanjinés)
- Ukumau (1966, Jorge Sanjinés)
- El Coraje del Pueblo (1967, Jorge Sanjinés)
- Yawar Mallku (1969, Jorge Sanjinés)
- Pueblo Chico (1974, Antonio Eguino)
- Chuquiago (1977, Antonio Eguino)

=== Brazil ===
- Limite (1931, Mário Peixoto)
- Ganga Bruta (1933, Humberto Mauro)
- O Cangaceiro (1952, Lima Barreto)
- O Grande Momento (1958, Roberto Santos)
- Porto das Caixas (1962, Paulo César Saraceni)
- O Pagador de Promessas (1962, Anselmo Duarte)
- Vidas Secas (1963, Nelson Pereira dos Santos)
- Noite Vazia (1964, Walter Hugo Khouri)
- Deus e o Diabo na Terra do Sol (1964, Glauber Rocha)
- São Paulo SA (1965, Luís Sérgio Person)
- A Grande Cidade (1966, Carlos Diegues)
- O Bandido da Luz Vermelha (1968, Rogério Sganzerla)
- Macunaíma (1969, Joaquim Pedro de Andrade)
- Eles Não Usam Black-Tie (1980, Leon Hirszman)
- Gaijin – Caminhos da Liberdade (1980, Tizuka Yamasaki)
- Pra Frente Brasil (1982, Roberto Farias)
- Cabra Marcado para Morrer (1984, Eduardo Coutinho)

=== Burkina Faso ===
- Le Sang des Parias (1971, Mamadou Djim Kola)
- Wend Kuuni (1982, Gaston Kaboré)
- Pawéogo (1982, Kollo Sanou)
- Jours de Tourmentes (1982, Paul Zoumbara)
- Yam Dabo (1986, Idrissa Ouédraogo)
- Desebagato (1987, Emmanuel Sanou)
- Histoire d'Orokia (1987, Jacob Sou)
- Zan Boko (1988, Gaston Kaboré)
- Yaaba (1988, Idrissa Ouédraogo)
- Laafi (1990, Pierre Yaméogo)
- Tilaï (1990, Idrissa Ouédraogo)
- Yelbeedo (1990, Abdoulaye D. Sow)
- Laada (1990, Drissa Touré)
- Sababu (1992, Joahny N. Traoré)
- Rabi (1992, Gaston Kaboré)

=== Canada ===
- The Song That Reached His Heart / An Unselfish Love / The Life of a Salmon (1910, J. Searle Dawley)
- Back to God's Country (1919, David M. Hartford)
- Carry On Sergeant! (1928, Bruce Bairnsfather)
- In the Shadow of the Pole (1928, Richard S. Finnie)
- The Arctic Patrol (1929, Richard S. Finnie)
- The Igloo Dwellers (1931, Richard S. Finnie)
- Canadian Cameo Series (1932/54, Gordon Sparling)
- Lest We Forget (1934, Frank C. Badgley)
- Films by Maurice Proulx (1937/59, Maurice Proulx)
- Animated Films of the National Film Board (1941/44, Norman McLaren)
- City of Gold (1957, Wolf Koenig and Colin Low)
- Mon Oncle Antoine (1970, Claude Jutra)
- Wedding in White (1972, William Fruet)
- Les Dernières Fiançailles (1973, Jean Pierre Lefebvre)

=== Chile ===
- Un Día de Trabajo en la Escuela de Caballería (1910/20, Anónimo)
- Parada Militar (1911, Anónimo)
- El Húsar de la Muerte (1925, Pedro Sienna)
- El Hechizo del Trigal (1939, Eugenio de Liguoro)
- La Casa está Vacía (1945, Carlos Schlepper)
- Cita con el Destino (1945, Miguel Frank)
- Música en Tu Corazón (1946, Miguel Frank)
- El Último Guapo (1947, Mario Lugones)
- Las Callampas (1957, Rafael Sánchez)
- Chile Paralelo 56 (1964, Rafael Sánchez)
- La Dama de las Camelias (1992, José Bohr)

=== China ===
- The Goddess (1934, Wu Yonggang)
- Street Angel (1937, Yuan Muzhi)
- Yijang Chunshui Dong Liu / A Spring River Flows East (1947, Cai Chusheng and Zheng Junli)
- Myriads of Light (1948, Shen Fu)
- Springtime in a Little Town (1948, Fei Mu)
- Life of a Beijing Policeman (1950, Shi Shui)
- New Year Sacrifice (1956, Sang Hu)
- The Lin Family Shop (1959, Shui Hua)
- Lin Zexu (1959, Zhen Junli and Cen Fan)
- Early Spring February (1963, Xie Tieli)
- My Memories of Old Beijing (1982, Wu Yigong)
- The Yellow Earth (1984, Chen Kaige)
- Hibiscus Town (1986, Xie Jin)
- Hong Gaoliang / Red Sorghum (1987, Zhang Yimou)
- Woman Demon Human (1987, Huang Shuqin)

=== Colombia ===
- El Drama del 15 de Octubre (1915, Francesco di Domenico)
- María (1921, Alfredo del Diestro y Máximo Calvo)
- Alma Provinciana (1925, Félix Joaquín Rodríguez)
- Garras de Oro (1928, P.P. Jambrina)
- Colombia Victoriosa (1933, Álvaro Acevedo and Gonzalo Acevedo)
- Allá en el Trapiche (1943, Roberto Saa Silva)
- 9 de Abril (1948, Camilo Correa)
- La Langosta Azul (1955, Álvaro Cepeda Samudio, Gabriel García Márquez, Luis Vicens and Enrique Grau)
- El Río de las Tumbas (1965, Julio Luzardo)
- Pasado Meridiano (1965, José María Arzuaga)
- Chircales (1968/72, Marta Rodríguez and Jorge Silva)
- Agarrando Pueblo (1977, Luis Ospina and Carlos Mayolo)
- Tiempo de Morir (1985, Jorge Alí Triana)
- Rodrigo D, No Futuro (1988, Víctor Manuel Gaviria)
- La Estrategia del Caracol (1993, Sergio Cabrera)
- La Gente de la Universal (1994, Felipe Aljure)

=== Côte d'Ivoire ===
- Dune de la Solitude (1964, Timité Bassori)
- La Femme au Couteau (1968, Timité Bassori)
- Concerto pour un Exil (1967, Désiré Ecaré)
- Amanie (1972, Roger Gnoan M'Bala)
- A Nous Deux France (1970, Désiré Ecaré)
- Adja-Tio (1980, Jean-Louis Koula)
- Abusuan (1972, Henri Duparc)
- Djeli (1981, Kramo Lancine Fadika)
- L'Herbe Sauvage (1977, Henri Duparc)
- Visage de Femme (1985, Désiré Ecaré)
- Bal Poussière (1988, Henri Duparc)
- Au Nom du Christ (1992, Roger Gnoan M'Bala)
- Rue Princesse (1993, Henri Duparc)
- Wariko (1993, Kramo Lancine Fadika)

=== Czech Republic ===
- Batalion (1927, Přemysl Pražský)
- Erotikon (1929, Gustav Machatý)
- Panen ství (1937, Otakar Vávra)
- Svět patří nám (1937, Martin Frič)
- Daleká cesta (1948, Alfréd Radok)
- Vynález zkázy (1958, Karel Zeman)
- Trápení (1961, Karel Kachyňa)
- Černý Petr (1963, Miloš Forman)
- Démanty noci (1963, Jan Němec)
- Obchod na Korze (1964, Ján Kadár and Elmar Klos)
- Intimní osvětlení (1965, Ivan Passer)
- Marketa Lazarová (1965, František Vláčil)
- Sedmikrásky (1965, Věra Chytilová)
- Ostře sledované vlaky (1966, Jiří Menzel)
- Všichni dobří rodáci (1968, Vojtěch Jasný)

=== Denmark ===
- Afgrunden (1910, Urban Gad)
- Ved Fængslets Port (1910, August Blom)
- Det Hemmelighedsfulde X (1913, Benjamin Christensen)
- Du skal ære din Hustru (1925, Carl Th. Dreyer)
- Præsten i Vejlby (1930, George Schnéevoigt)
- Danmarksfilmen (1935, Poul Henningsen)
- Vredens Dag (1943, Carl Th. Dreyer)
- De Røde Enge (1945, Bodil Ipsen and Lau Lauritzen Jr.)
- Ditte Menneskebarn (1946, Bjarne Henning-Jensen)
- Ordet (1955, Carl Th. Dreyer)
- Sult (1966, Henning Carlsen)
- Der var engang en Krig (1966, Palle Kjærulff-Schmidt)
- Johnny Larsen (1979, Morten Arnfred)
- The Element of Crime (1983, Lars von Trier)
- Pelle Erobreren (1987, Bille August)

=== Ecuador ===
- Los Invencibles Shuaras del Alto Amazonas (1926, Carlos Crespi)
- Obra Fílmica Documental Miguel A. Álvarez (1927/35, M.A. Álvarez)
- El Terror de la Frontera (1929, Luis Martínez, Teresa Quirola and Mery Holguín)
- Se Conocieron en Guayaquil (1949, Paco Villar)
- Cadena Infinita (1949, Demetrio Aguilera Malta)
- Amanecer en el Pichincha (1950, Alberto Santana)
- Mariana de Jesús, Azucena de Quito (1959, Paco Villar)
- Los Guambras (1961, Gabriel Tramontana and Manuel Cirilo San Miguel)
- Obra Fílmica Documental Karl Gartelman (1970, Karl Gartelman)
- Expedición a los Llanganates (s.f., Torgny Andemberger and Rolf Blomberg)

=== Egypt ===
- Lasheen (1939, Ferites Cramb)
- El Azimah (1940, Kamal Selem)
- Elsouk Elsoda (1946, Kamal Eltelmesany)
- Hayah aw Maut (1955, Kamal Elsheikh)
- El Fetewa (1957, Salah Abou Seif)
- Bab Elhadid (1958, Youssef Chahine)
- Emraa fi Eltareik (1959, Ezz Eldien Zolfakar)
- Bedaya wa Nehaya (1960, Salah Abou Seif)
- Seraa fi Elnile (1960, Ataf Saleem)
- Elzowga No 13 (1962, Fatin Abdel Wahab)
- Elharam (1965, Henry Barakat)
- Elbostagy (1968, Hussein Kamal)
- Seraa el Abtal (1968, Tawfiq Saleh)
- Elmoumia (1969, Shadi Abdel Salam)
- Elard (1970, Youssef Chahine)

=== Ethiopia ===
- "3002" (1976, Teferi Bizuayehu)
- Struggle Victory, Victory Struggle (1978, Michel Papatakis)
- Father of Goats (1983, Ivo Shtreiker)
- The Hamer Herdsman and His Song (1983, Ivo Shtreiker)
- Dawn of Hope (1985, Mohammed Idris)
- Addis Ababa (1985, Tesfaye Sinke)
- Struggle Against Drought (1986, Solomon Bekele)
- Quench (1986, Solomon Bekele)
- Ethiopian Reconstruction (1986, Desta Worku)
- Lalibela (1988, Desta Worku)
- Gondar (1990, Desta Worku)
- Nutrition (1990, Desta Worku)
- Aster (1991, Solomon Bekele)

=== Finland ===
- Nummisuutarit (1923, Erkki Karu)
- Juha (1937, Nyrki Tapiovaara)
- Kulkurin Valssi (1941, Toivo Särkka)
- Valkoiset Ruusut (1943, Hannu Leminen)
- Sellaisena kuin Sinä Minut Halusit (1944, Teuvo Tulio)
- Ihmiset Suviyössä (1948, Valentin Vaala)
- Valkoinen Peura (1952, Erik Blomberg)
- Tuntematon Sotilas (1955, Edvin Laine)
- Elokuu (1956, Matti Kassila)
- Työmiehen Päiväkirja (1967, Risto Jarva)
- Kahdeksan Surmanluotia (1972, Mikko Niskanen)
- Maa on Syntinen Laulu (1973, Rauni Mollberg)
- Arvottomat (1982, Mika Kaurismäki)
- Varjoja Paratiisissa (1986, Aki Kaurismäki)
- Tuhlaajapoika (1992, Veikko Aaltonen)

=== Germany ===
- Der Student von Prag (1913, Stellan Rye)
- Das Cabinet des Dr. Caligari (1919/20, Robert Wiene)
- Nosferatu – Eine Symphonie des Grauens (1921/22, F.W. Murnau)
- Die Freudlose Gasse (1925, G.W. Pabst)
- Metropolis (1925/27, Fritz Lang)
- Berlin – Die Sinfonie der Großstadt (1927, Walther Ruttmann)
- Mutter Krausens Fahrt ins Glück (1929, Piel Jutzi)
- Menschen am Sonntag (1929/30, Robert Siodmak y Edgar G. Ulmer)
- Der blaue Engel (1929/30, Josef von Sternberg)
- M (1931, Fritz Lang)
- Kuhle Wampe oder Wem gehört die Welt? (1932, Slatan Dudow)
- Die Mörder sind unter uns (1946, Wolfgang Staudte)
- Der Untertan (1951, Wolfgang Staudte)
- Die Brücke (1959, Bernhard Wicki)
- Abschied von Gestern (1965/66, Alexander Kluge)

=== Greece ===
- Daphnis ke Chloe (1931, Orestis Laskos)
- I Kalpiki Lira (1955, Giorgos Tzavellas)
- Stella (1955, Michalis Cacoyannis)
- O Drakos (1956, Nikos Koundouros)
- Pote tin Kyriaki (1960, Jules Dassin)
- Tragodia tou Aegeou (1961, Vassilis Maros)
- Electra (1962, Michael Cacoyannis)
- Prossopo me Prossopo (1966, Roviros Manthoulis)
- Mechri to Plio (1966, Alexis Damianos)
- I Ekdromi (1966, Takis Kanellopoulos)
- Anaparastassi (1970, Theo Angelopoulos)
- Proxenio tis Annas (1972, Dinos Katsouridis)
- Ti Ekanes ston Polemo Thanassi? (1971, Dinos Katsouridis)
- O Thiassos (1975, Theo Angelopoulos)
- I Fotografía (1986, Nikos Papatakis)

=== The Holy See ===
- Leone XIII (1896, n/d)
- Conclave ed Elezione di Pio XII (1939, n/d)
- Pastor Angelicus (1942, Romolo Marcellini)
- Pio XI e Marconi (s.f., n/d)

=== Hungary ===
- Az Aranyember (1918, Alexander Korda)
- Hyppolit, a Lakáj (1931, István Székely)
- Emberek a Havason (1941, István Szöts)
- Valahol Európában (1947, Géza Radványi)
- Körhinta (1955, Zoltán Fábri)
- Szegénylegények (1965, Miklós Jancsó)
- Apa (1966, István Szabó)
- Hideg Napok (1966, András Kovács)
- Szerelem (1970, Károly Makk)
- Szindbád (1971, Zoltán Huszárik)
- Amerikai Anzix (1975, Gábor Bódý)
- A kis Valentino (1979, András Jeles)
- Mephisto (1981, István Szabó)
- Megáll az Idő (1981, Péter Gothár)
- Az én XX. Századom (1989, Ildikó Enyedi)

=== India ===
- Kaliya Mardan (1919, D.G. Phalke)
- Prem Sayas / The Light of Asia (1925, Franz Osten and Himansu Rai)
- Devdas (1935, P.C. Barua)
- Achut Kanya (1936, Franz Osten)
- Sant Tukaram (1936, Vishnupant Govind Damle and Sheikh Fattelal)
- Pukar (1939, Sohrab Modi)
- Thyagabhumi (1939, K. Subramanyam)
- Kalpana (1948, Uday Shankar)
- Chandralekha (1948, S.S. Vasan)
- Awara (1951, Raj Kapoor)
- Pather Panchali (1955, Satyajit Ray)
- Pyaasa (1957, Guru Dutt)
- Mother India (1957, Mehboob Khan)
- Mughal-e-Azam (1960, K. Asif)
- Subarnarekha (1962, Ritwik Ghatak)

=== Indonesia ===
- Daran dan Doa (1950, Usmar Ismail)
- Harimau Tjampa (1953, D. Djajakusuma)
- Pejuang (1960, Usmar Ismail)
- Pagar Kawat Berduri (1961, Asrul Sani)
- Matjan Kemajoran (1965, Wim Umboh)
- Si Mamad (1973, Sjuman Djaya)
- Perawan Desa (1978, Frank Rorimpandey)
- Rembulan dan Matahari (1979, Slamet Rahardjo)
- Roro Mendut (1982, Ami Priyono)
- Titian Serambut di Belah Tujuh (1982, Chairul Umam)
- Doea Tanda Mata (1984, Teguh Karya)
- Nagabonar (1986, M.T. Risyaf)
- Tjut Nja' Dhien (1986, Eros Djarot)
- Ayahku (1987, Agus Elyas)
- Surat untuk Bidadari (1992, Garin Nugroho)

=== Ireland ===
- A Lad from Old Ireland (1910/12, Sidney Olcott)
- Willy Reilly and His Colleen Bawn (1920, John McDonagh)
- Man of Aran (1934, Robert Flaherty)
- Guests of the Nation (1936, Denis Johnston)
- The Dawn (1936, Tom Cooper)
- The Early Bird (1936, Donovan Pedelty)
- West of Kerry – The Islandman (1939, Donal O'Cahill)
- W.B. Yeats: A Tribute (1950, George Fleischmann and J.D. Sheridan)
- The Quiet Man (1952, John Ford)
- Amharc Éireann Newsreel (1957/63, Jim Mulkerns and Colm O'Laoghaire)
- Mise Éire (1959, George Morrison)
- Exposure (1978, Kieran Hickey)
- Pigs (1984, Cathal Black)
- Anne Devlin (1984, Pat Murphy)
- Reefer and the Model (1988, Joe Comerford)
- My Left Foot (1989, Jim Sheridan)
- The Crying Game (1992, Neil Jordan)
- The Bishop's Story (1994, Bob Quinn)

=== Israel ===
- Avodah (1934, Helmar Lerski)
- Description of a Struggle (1961, Chris Marker)
- Sallah Shabbati (1964, Ephraim Kishon)
- Hole in the Moon (1965, Uri Zohar)
- Kazablan (1973, Menahem Golan)
- The 81st Blow (1974, Haim Gouri, Jacques Ehrlich and David Bergman)
- My Michael (1975, Dan Wolman)
- Hide and Seek (1980, Dan Wolman)
- Transit (1980, Daniel Wachsmann)
- Hamsin (1982, Daniel Wachsmann)
- Beyond the Walls (1984, Uri Barbash)
- Avanti Popolo (1986, Rafi Bukaee)
- Smile of the Lamb (1986, Shimon Dotan)
- Summer of Aviya (1988, Eli Cohen)
- Life According to Agfa (1992, Assi Dayan)

=== Italy ===
- Cabiria (1914, Giovanni Pastrone)
- Assunta Spina (1915, Gustavo Serena)
- La Corona di Ferro (1941, Alessandro Blasetti)
- Ossessione (1943, Luchino Visconti)
- Roma Città Aperta (1945, Roberto Rossellini)
- Paisà (1946, Roberto Rossellini)
- La Terra Trema (1948, Luchino Visconti)
- Ladri di Biciclette (1948, Vittorio De Sica)
- Senso (1954, Luchino Visconti)
- L'Avventura (1959, Michelangelo Antonioni)
- La Dolce Vita (1960, Federico Fellini)
- Otto e Mezzo (1963, Federico Fellini)
- L'Albero degli Zoccoli (1978, Ermanno Olmi)
- Nuovo Cinema Paradiso (1988, Giuseppe Tornatore)
- Il Ladro di Bambini (1992, Gianni Amelio)

=== Kazakhstan ===
- Abai's Songs (1945, G. Roshal y E. Aron)
- His Time Will Come (1957, Mazhit Begalin)
- My Name is Kozha (1963, Abdulla Karsakbaev)
- Traces are Going till Horizon (1964, Mazhit Begalin)
- Aldar-Kose (1964, Shaken Aimanov)
- The Land of the Fathers (1966, Shaken Aimanov)
- The Touch of Eternity (1966, Ararat Mashanov)
- The Secrecy of an Open Palm (1968, Oraz Abishev)
- Kyz-Dzhibek (1970, Sultan Hodzhikov)
- Shok and Sher (1971, Kanybek Kasymbekov)
- Toro (1986, Talgat Temenov)
- The Needle (1987, Rashid Nougmanov)
- The Last Stop (1989, Serik Aprymov)
- Fish in Love (1989, Abai Karpykov)
- The Touch (1989, Amanzhol Aituarov)
- Fall of Otrar (1990, Ardak Amirkoulov)
- Surzhekey (1991, Damir Manabaev)
- Kairat (1991, Darezhan Omirbaev)
- Woman Between Two Brothers (1991, Amir Karakoulov)
- The Place on Gray Three Corn (1993, Ermek Shinarbaev)

=== Laos ===
- La Conférence à Genève (1956, n/d)
- Deux Provinces Unifiées: Samneva et Phonsaly (1956, n/d)
- 20 Ans de la Révolution (1965, Sopha Khotphouthone)
- La Victoire en Été (1970, M. Bounphanh)
- La Terre de la Liberté (1970, Phonephet Inphom)
- La Conférence de Vientiane (1974, Vannakhone)
- La Conférence des Représentants de Tout Pays (1975, Somtheu Phetmany)
- La Ville Ancienne Raconte la Vie Nouvelle (1980, Kaseme Taothong)
- Troisième Congrès du Parti (1983, Kaseme Taothong)
- La Tonnerre sur la Plaine des Jarres (1983, Somchit Phonseora)
- Dix Ans sur la Route Progressée (1985, Kaseme Taothong)
- Le Lotus Rouge (1988, Som-ok Southiphone)

=== Lebanon ===
- Ila Eyne (1957, Georges Nasser)
- Chouchou wal Million (1963, Antoine Rémy)
- Al Ajniha el Moutakassira (1964, Youssef Maalouf)
- Biyyaa al Khawatem (1965, Youssef Chahine)
- Chabab Taht al Chams (1966, Samir Nasri)
- Mi'at Wajeh li Yawm Wahed (1972, Christian Ghazi)
- Kafr Kassem (1973, Borhane Alaouie)
- Beyrouth ya Beyrouth (1975, Maroun Bagdadi)
- El Janoub bi Khayr (serie documental) (1979/83, Maroun Bagdadi)
- Houroub Saghira (1982, Maroun Bagdadi)
- Beyrouth al Lika' (1981, Borhane Alaouie)
- Beyrouth plus jamais / Beyrouth ma ville (serie) (1975/83, Jocelyne Saab)
- Ma'araka (1986, Roger Assaf)

=== Mexico ===
- El Automóvil Gris (1919, Enrique Rosas, Joaquín Coss and Juan Canals)
- Santa (1931, Antonio Moreno)
- La Mujer del Puerto (1933, Arcady Boytler)
- Redes (1934, Emilio Gómez Muriel and Fred Zinnemann)
- Allá en el Rancho Grande (1936, Fernando de Fuentes)
- María Candelaria (Xochimilco) (1943, Emilio Fernández)
- Campeón sin Corona (1945, Alejandro Galindo)
- Nosotros los Pobres (1947, Ismael Rodríguez)
- Los Olvidados (1950, Luis Buñuel)
- Raíces (1953, Benito Alazraki)
- Reed, México Insurgente (1970, Paul Leduc)
- Canoa (1975, Felipe Cazals)
- El Lugar sin Límites (1977, Arturo Ripstein)
- Como Agua para Chocolate (1991, Alfonso Arau)
- El Héroe (1993, Luis Carlos Carrera)

=== New Zealand ===
- Royal Visit of the Duke and Duchess of Cornwall and York to New Zealand (1901, New Zealand Government)
- He Pito Whakaatu a Ngā Iwi Māori (1919/23, James McDonald)
- Rewi's Last Stand (1940, Rudall Hayward)
- Broken Barrier (1952, Roger Mirams and John O'Shea)
- Free Radicals (1958, Len Lye)
- The Spirits and the Times Will Teach (1974, Barry Barclay)
- Patu! (1983, Merata Mita)
- Utu (1983, Geoff Murphy)
- Kitchen Sink (1989, Alison Maclean)
- An Angel at My Table (1989, Jane Campion)
- Mana Waka (1990, Merata Mita)
- Once Were Warriors (1994, Lee Tamahori)

=== Norway ===
- Fante-Anne (1920, Rasmus Breistein)
- Markens Grøde (1921, Gunnar Sommerfeldt)
- Troll-Elgen (1927, Walter Fürst)
- Fant (1937, Tancred Ibsen)
- Gjest Baardsen (1939, Tancred Ibsen)
- Døden er et Kjærtegn (1949, Edith Carlmar)
- Gategutter (1949, Arne Skouen and Ulf Greber)
- Det Brenner i Natt! (1955, Arne Skouen)
- Ni Liv (1957, Arne Skouen)
- De Dødes Tjern (1958, Kåre Bergstrøm)
- Jakten (1959, Erik Løchen)
- Flåklypa Grand Prix (1975, Ivo Caprino)
- Hustruer (1975, Anja Breien)
- Løperjenten (1981, Vibeke Løkkeberg)
- Ofelas / Veiviseren (1987, Nils Gaup)

=== Pakistan ===
- Saat Lakh (1957, Jaffar Malik)
- Wadah (1957, W.Z. Ahmed)
- Anarkali (1958, Anwar Kamal)
- Kartar Singh (1959, Saif-ud-Din Saif)
- Shaheed (1962, Khalil Qaiser)
- Ghunghat (1962, Khurshid Anwar)
- Baji (1963, Suleman)
- Badnam (1964, Iqbal Shehzad and Hassan Tariq)
- Lakhoon Main Aik (1967, Raza Mir)
- Saiqa (1968, Laeeq Akhtar)
- Ek Gunah Aur Sahi (1975, Hassan Tariq)
- Muthi Bhar Chaval (1978, Sangeeta)
- Bandish (1980, Nazarul Islam)

=== Papua New Guinea ===
- Trobriand Cricket (1974, Garry Kilden y Jerry Leach)
- The Red Bowmen (1976, Chris Owen)
- Ileksen (1976, Dennis O'Rourke)
- Yumi Yet (1975, Dennis O'Rourke)
- Malagan Labadama (1980, Chris Owen)
- Tukana – Husat i Asua? (1982, Chris Owen y Albert Toro)
- Man Without Pigs (1990, Chris Owen)
- Workabaut Bilong Tontew (1971, Oliver Howes)
- Towards Baruya Manhood (1972, Ian Dunlap y Maurice Godelier)
- Angels of War (1978, Andrew Pike y Hank Nelson)
- Pearls and Savages (1922, Frank Hurley)
- Sinmia (1988, Kumain Nungya)
- Tinpis Run (1991, Pengan Nengo y Severan Blanchet)

=== Peru ===
- Luis Pardo (1927, Enrique Cornejo Villanueva)
- Los Palomillas del Rímac (1938, Sigifredo Salas)
- La Lunareja (1946, Bernardo Roca Rey)
- Kukuli (1961, Eulogio Nishiyama, Luis Figueroa and César Villanueva)
- La Muralla Verde (1969, Armando Robles Godoy)
- Espejismo (1972, Armando Robles Godoy)
- Kuntur Wachana (1977, Federico García)
- Tupac Amaru (1984, Federico García)
- La Ciudad y los Perros (1985, Francisco Lombardi)
- Gregorio (1985, Fernando Espinoza, Stefan Kaspar and Alejandro Legaspi)
- La Boca del Lobo (1988, Francisco Lombardi)
- Juliana (1988, Fernando Espinoza and Alejandro Legaspi)
- Caídos del Cielo (1990, Francisco Lombardi)
- Alias la Gringa (1991, Alberto Durant)
- La Vida es Una Sola (1992, Marianne Eyde)

=== Poland ===
- Kanał (1956, Andrzej Wajda)
- Eroica (1957, Andrzej Munk)
- Popiół i Diament (1958, Andrzej Wajda)
- Zezowate Szczęście (1959, Andrzej Munk)
- Matka Joanna od Aniołów (1960, Jerzy Kawalerowicz)
- Świadectwo Urodzenia (1961, Stanisław Różewicz)
- Rękopis Znaleziony w Saragossie (1964, Wojciech Jerzy Has)
- Wesele (1972, Andrzej Wajda)
- Sanatorium pod Klepsydrą (1973, Wojciech Jerzy Has)
- Ziemia Obiecana (1974, Andrzej Wajda)
- Barwy Ochronne (1976, Krzysztof Zanussi)
- Człowiek z Marmuru (1976, Andrzej Wajda)
- Dreszcze (1981, Wojciech Marczewski)
- Austeria (1982, Jerzy Kawalerowicz)
- Krótki Film o Zabijaniu (1987, Krzysztof Kieślowski)

=== Portugal ===
- Lisboa, Crónica Anedótica (1930, José Leitão de Barros)
- Maria do Mar (1930, José Leitão de Barros)
- Douro, Faina Fluvial (1931, Manoel de Oliveira)
- A Canção de Lisboa (1933, Cottinelli Telmo)
- A Canção da Terra (1938, Jorge Brum do Canto)
- O Pai Tirano (1941, António Lopes Ribeiro)
- Aniki-Bobó (1942, Manoel de Oliveira)
- Acto da Primavera (1962, Manoel de Oliveira)
- Os Verdes Anos (1963, Paulo Rocha)
- Uma Abelha na Chuva (1971, Fernando Lopes)
- Trás-os-Montes (1976, António Reis and Margarida Martins Cordeiro)
- Amor de Perdição (1978, Manoel de Oliveira)
- Um Adeus Português (1985, João Botelho)
- Recordações da Casa Amarela (1989, João César Monteiro)
- Non ou a Vã Glória de Mandar (1990, Manoel de Oliveira)

=== Puerto Rico ===
- Los Peloteros (1951, Jack Delano)
- El Puente (1954, Amílcar Tirado)
- Modesta (1955, Benjamin Doniger)
- Maruja (1959, Óscar Orzabal Quintana)
- El Salvador: El Pueblo Vencerá (1980, Diego de la Texera)
- Dios los Cría (1980, Jacobo Morales)
- A Step Away (1980, Roberto Ponce)
- La Operación (1982, Ana María García)
- Boleto de Ida (1983, Luis Molina)
- La Gran Fiesta (1986, Marcos Zurinaga)
- Las Plumas del Múcaro (1989, Francisco López)
- Lo que le Pasó a Santiago (1990, Jacobo Morales)
- Los Cuentos de Abelardo (1990, Luis Molina)
- Cocolos y Roqueros (1992, Ana María García)
- Linda Sare (1994, Jacobo Morales)

=== Republic of Korea ===
- Arirang (1926, Na Un-kyu)
- Im Ja-ubun Narusbae (1932, Lee Kyu-hwan)
- Chayu Manse (1946, Chun Chang-gun)
- Chayu Buin (1956, Han Hyong-mo)
- Obaltan (1961, Yoo Hyun-mok)
- Seoung Choon-Hyang (1961, Shin Sang-ok)
- Pyol-Durui Kohyang (1974, Lee Chang-ho)
- Sampo Kanun Gil (1975, Lee Man-hee)
- Mandala (1981, Im Kwon-taek)
- Kkobangdongne Saram-Dul (1982, Bae Yong-kyun)
- Gilsottum (1985, Im Kwon-taek)
- Ssibaji (1986, Im Kwon-taek)
- Chilsu-wa Mansu (1988, Park Kwang-soo)
- Dharma-ga Tongjoguro Kan Kkadalgun? (1989, Bae Yong-kyun)
- Sopyonje (1993, Im Kwon-taek)

=== Slovakia ===
- Zem Spieva (1933, Karol Plicka)
- Vlčie Diery (1948, Paľo Bielik)
- Pieseň o Sivom Holubovi (1961, Stanislav Barabáš)
- Slnko v Sieti (1962, Štefan Uher)
- Boxer a Smrť (1962, Peter Solan)
- Organ (1964, Štefan Uher)
- Krotká (1967, Stanislav Barabáš)
- Kristove Roky (1967, Juraj Jakubisko)
- Balada o Siedmich Obesených (1968, Martin Hollý)
- Fotografovanie Obyvateľov Domu (1968, Dušan Trančík)
- Odchádzá Človek (1968, Martin Slivka)
- Slávnosť v Botanickej Záhrade (1969, Elo Havetta)
- 322 (1969, Dušan Hanák)
- Vtáčkovia, Siroty a Blázni (1969, Juraj Jakubisko)
- Obrazy Starého Sveta (1972, Dušan Hanák)

=== Slovenia ===
- Odhod od Maše v Ljutomeru (1905, Karol Grossmann)
- Bloški Smučarji (1932, Metod in Milka Badjura)
- Triglavske Strmine (1932, Ferdo Delak)
- Na Svoji Zemlji (1948, France Štiglic)
- Kekec (1951, Jože Gale)
- Vesna (1953, František Čap)
- Mojster Plečnik (1953, Mirko Grobler)
- Dolina Miru (1956, France Štiglic)
- Tistega Lepega Dne (1962, France Štiglic)
- Rdeče Klasje (1970, Živojin Pavlović)
- Cvetje v Jeseni (1973, Matjaž Klopčič)
- Učna Leta Izumitelja Polža (1982, Jane Kavčič)
- Rdeči Boogie ali Kaj ti je Deklica (1982, Karpo Godina)
- Ljubezen (1984, Rajko Ranfl)
- Umetni Raj (1990, Karpo Godina)

=== Spain ===
- El Negro que Tenía el Alma Blanca (1926, Benito Perojo)
- El Sexto Sentido (1928, Nemesio Sobrevila)
- Carmen, la de Triana (1936, Florián Rey)
- La Torre de los Siete Jorobados (1944, Edgar Neville)
- Cielo Negro (1951, Manuel Mur Oti)
- Calle Mayor (1956, Juan Antonio Bardem)
- El Pisito (1958, Marco Ferreri)
- Viridiana (1961, Luis Buñuel)
- El Verdugo (1963, Luis García Berlanga)
- El Extraño Viaje (1964, Fernando Fernán-Gómez)
- Bilbao (1978, José Juan Bigas Luna)
- Bodas de Sangre (1981, Carlos Saura)
- El Sur (1983, Víctor Erice)
- ¿Qué He Hecho Yo para Merecer Esto? (1984, Pedro Almodóvar)
- Amantes (1991, Vicente Aranda)

=== Sweden ===
- Ingeborg Holm (1913, Victor Sjöström)
- Herr Arnes Pengar (1919, Mauritz Stiller)
- Körkarlen (1921, Victor Sjöström)
- Hets (1944, Alf Sjöberg)
- Flicka och Hyacinter (1950, Hasse Ekman)
- Fröken Julie (1951, Alf Sjöberg)
- Gycklarnas Afton (1953, Ingmar Bergman)
- Sommarnattens Leende (1955, Ingmar Bergman)
- Det Sjunde Inseglet (1957, Ingmar Bergman)
- Smultronstället (1957, Ingmar Bergman)
- Kvarteret Korpen (1963, Bo Widerberg)
- Här har du ditt Liv (1966, Jan Troell)
- Fanny och Alexander (1982, Ingmar Bergman)
- Den Enfaldige Mördaren (1982, Hans Alfredson)
- Mitt Liv som Hund (1986, Lasse Hallström)

=== Switzerland ===
- Visages d'Enfants (1923, Jacques Feyder)
- La Vocation d'André Carrel (1925, Jean Choux)
- Rapt (1933, Dimitri Kirsanoff)
- Romeo und Juliet auf dem Dorfe (1941, Hans Trommer and Valerien Schmidely)
- Die letzte Chance (1945, Leopold Lindtberg)
- Uli der Knecht (1954, Franz Schnyder)
- Bäckerei Zürrer (1957, Kurt Früh)
- Siamo Italiani (1964, Alexander J. Seiler, June Kovach and Robert Gnant)
- Charles mort ou vif (1969, Alain Tanner)
- Les Arpenteurs (1972, Michel Soutter)
- L'Invitation (1973, Claude Goretta)
- La Paloma (1974, Daniel Schmid)
- Die Erschiessung des Landesverräters Ernst S. (1976, Richard Dindo)
- Les Petites Fugues (1978, Yves Yersin)
- Höhenfeuer (1985, Fredi M. Murer)

=== Former Yugoslav Republic of Macedonia ===
- Film heritage of the Manaki Brothers (1905/23, Yanaki and Milton Manaki)
- Macedonia 1923 (1923, Arsenij Jovkov)
- Frosina (1952, Voislav Nanović)
- Rhythm and Sound (1955, Trajče Popov)
- The Old Bazaar (1955, Ace Petrovski)
- Galichnick Wedding (1955, Ace Petrovski)
- Medieval Frescos in Macedonia (1957, Kočo Nedkov)
- Ohrid Lake (1958, Oto Denesh)
- Miss Stone (1958, Žika Mitrović)
- Dojran Lake (1961, Trajče Popov)
- A Quiet Summer (1961, Dimitrie Osmanli)
- Skopje 26 July 1963 (1963, Kočo Nedkov)
- Time Without War (1969, Branko Gapo)
- Black Seed (1971, Kiril Čenevski)
- Happy New '49 (1986, Stole Popov)

=== Ukraine ===
- Two Days (1927, Georgy Stabovy)
- The Ringing Mountain (1927, Aleksandr Dovzhenko)
- A Man with a Camera (1929, Dziga Vertov)
- The Symphony of Donbass (1930, Dziga Vertov)
- The Earth (1930, Aleksandr Dovzhenko)
- The Assault Nights (1931, Ivan Kavaleridze)
- Bohdan Khmelnytsky (1941, Igor Savtchenko)
- The Rainbow (1943, Mark Donskoi)
- The Green Van (1959, Leonid Gabai)
- Don't Try to Kill Two Hares with One Stone (1961, Viktor Ivanov)
- The Shades of the Forgotten Ancestors (1964, Sergiy Paradjanov)
- On the Eve of St. John's Day (1968, Yuri Illienko)
- The Stony Cross (1968, Leonid Osyka)
- The Long Send-Off (1971, Kira Mouratova)
- How the Cossacks Liberated Their Fiancées (1989, Volodymyr Dakhno and Edouard Kirich)

=== United States of America ===
- Intolerance (1916, D.W. Griffith)
- Nanook of the North (1922, Robert Flaherty)
- The Gold Rush (1925, Charles Chaplin)
- Snow White and the Seven Dwarfs (1937, David Hand)
- Stagecoach (1939, John Ford)
- Mr. Smith Goes to Washington (1939, Frank Capra)
- Gone with the Wind (1939, Victor Fleming)
- Citizen Kane (1941, Orson Welles)
- The Best Years of Our Lives (1946, William Wyler)
- Singin' in the Rain (1952, Gene Kelly y Stanley Donen)
- Vertigo (1958, Alfred Hitchcock)
- Some Like It Hot (1959, Billy Wilder)
- 2001: A Space Odyssey (1968, Stanley Kubrick)
- The Godfather Parts I and II (1972/74, Francis Ford Coppola)
- Raging Bull (1980, Martin Scorsese)

=== Venezuela ===
- The Yacht Isabel Arrived This Afternoon (1949, Carlos Hugo Christensen)
- La escalinata (1950, César Enríquez)
- Araya (1959, Margot Benacerraf)
- Los muertos sí salen (1976, Alfredo Lugo)
- Soy un delincuente (1976, Clemente de la Cerda)
- The Smoking Fish (1977, Román Chalbaud)
- El domador (1978, Joaquín Cortés)
- País portátil (1979, Iván Feo and Antonio Llerandi)
- Iniciación de un Shamán (1979, Manuel de Pedro)
- Caño Manamo (1983, Carlos Azpúrua)
- The House of Water (1984, Jacobo Penzo)
- Little Revenge (1985, Olegario Barrera)
- De cómo Anita Camacho quiso levantarse a Marino Méndez (1986, Alfredo Anzola)
- Macu, The Policeman's Woman (1987, Solveig Hoogesteijn)
- Jericó (1990, Luis Alberto Lamata)

=== Yugoslavia ===
- Krunisanje Kralja Petra I Karadjordjevića (1904, Arnold Muir Wilson)
- Proglašenje Crne Gore za Kraljevinu (1910, n/d)
- Povratak Srpskih Pobednika (1913, Slavko Jovanović)
- Rudareva Sreća (1926, Josip Novak)
- Grešnica bez Greha (1929, Kosta Novaković)
- Beograd, Prestonica Kraljevine Jugoslavije (1930, Vojin Đorđević)
- Sa Verom u Boga (1932, Mihajlo Al. Popović)
- Golgota Srbije (PGM I) (1932, Stanislav Krakov)
- Slom Jugoslavije (1941, German Military Film Service)
- Priča Jednog Dana (1941, Maks Kalmic)
- Nevinost bez Zaštite (1943, Dragoljub Aleksić)
- Beograd (1945, Nikola Popović)
- Jasenovac (1945, Gustav Gavrin and Kosta Hlavaty)
- Slavica (1947, Vjekoslav Afrić)
- Skupljači Perja (1967, Aleksandar Petrović)
