= U.S. sterilization policies in Puerto Rico =

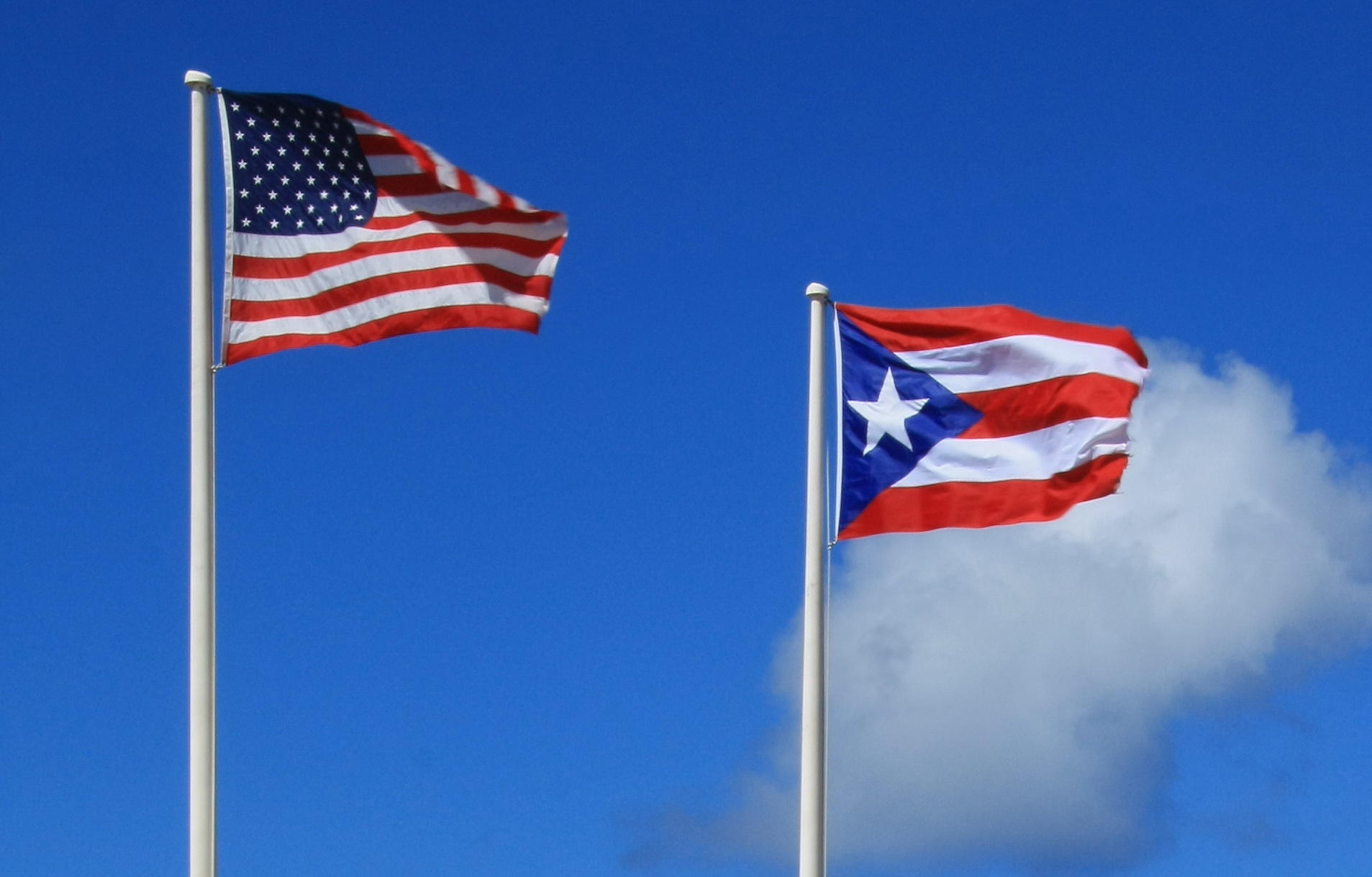
Flag of Puerto Rico alongside Flag of the United States

Influenced by neo-Malthusian principles, the United States and local Puerto Ricans first attempted to address the perceived problem of overpopulation in Puerto Rico, believed to be the source of many of the island's problems, through birth control (Note: Susan G. Enberg, based on the work of pediatrician Helen Rodríguez Trías, defines "birth control" as a voluntary and reversible procedure, "negative eugenics" as a policy that aims to purify society based on class or race, and "population control" as a set of policies, often coercive, aimed at hindering or completely preventing people from having children.) programs in the 1920s. In the 1930s, the local government passed legislation promoting sterilization. (Note: Obstetrician and gynecologist Herbert B. Peterson, uses "sterilization" to refer to a form of birth control that is intended to leave a person permanently unable to have children.) With the start of Operation Bootstrap in 1945, hundreds of clinics were established on the island to perform sterilizations, and by the 1950s, sterilization had become the primary means of birth control.

In the late 1960s, the Puerto Rican government began offering tubal ligations to women at free or reduced cost. Many of these procedures were performed under duress and without informed consent, and poor women were often pressured to undergo the procedure. These coercive practices continued into at least the early 1970s, though reports on its prevalence afterward vary.

During this time, opposition to sterilization arose in the mainland United States from organizations – including the Young Lords, the Committee to End Sterilization Abuse (CESA), and the Committee for Abortion Rights and Against Sterilization Abuse (CARASA) – as well as from American conservatives. Sterilization rates continued to rise, reaching 39% among Puerto Rican women of childbearing age by 1982. However, these rates eventually fell in the 1990s as United States foreign policy shifted from a population control paradigm towards one of reproductive rights and Puerto Rican women began to prefer other birth control methods.

Historical sterilization policies are under-discussed in Puerto Rico, but knowledge of them has increased in recent years. The topic is discussed at length in books and journal articles published from the 1970s to the 2020s and covered in the documentary La Operación. Some consider coerced sterilization to be part of a genocidal (Note: According to the Genocide Convention, "imposing measures intended to prevent births" of a "national, ethnical, racial or religious group" is a form of genocide.) population control campaign waged against Puerto Ricans. Others argue that coercion was more limited in scope and not systematic in nature.

== Background ==
=== Malthusianism and eugenics ===
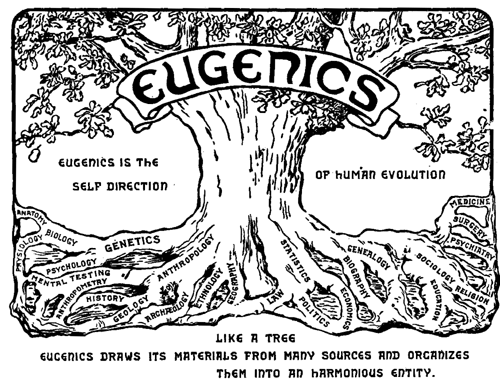
The logo of the Eugenics Conference

In 1798, British political economist Thomas Malthus published An Essay on the Principle of Population, in which he discusses his belief that population grows exponentially while food supply grows linearly. Malthus theorized that food supply provides a check on human overpopulation by limiting births and causing disease, starvation, and "vice". (Note: Malthus cites several examples of "vice", including brothels, drinking, gambling, "unwholesome trades", inattentiveness to children, and urbanization.) Malthus's writings were controversial in his time and continued to be after his death. However, they were also influential, with the Malthusian League being founded in the United Kingdom in 1877 to promote awareness of Malthus's theory. While Malthus, a clergyman, argued for abstinence and postponed marriages as a means of population control, these "neo-Malthusians" advocated for the use of birth control.

Around the same time, the idea of eugenics was becoming popular. While ideas of hereditary transmission and "prudent" reproduction predate it, behavioral geneticist Francis Galton's article "Hereditary Talent and Character" is generally considered the origin of modern eugenics—a term coined by Galton. According to Galton, eugenics involved the control and planning of human breeding based on the principle of selection. Early eugenicists opposed neo-Malthusians' emphasis on contraception, advocating instead for "positive eugenics" based on education, persuasion, and social policy reform. However, by the 1910s, eugenicists were advocating for the use of some forms of Malthusian "negative eugenics", including contraception, on members of the population they viewed as undesirable. By the 1930s, several forms of negative eugenics had become institutionalized in the United States, with laws against miscegenation in 24 states and laws calling for the sterilization of criminals and the mentally ill in 30.

=== Population discourse in Puerto Rico ===
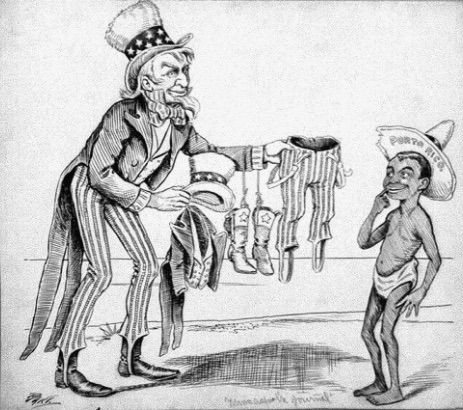
A political cartoon featuring Uncle Sam offering a suit of "stars and stripes" to a Puerto Rican boy

The United States gained control of Puerto Rico in 1898 after winning the Spanish–American War. In assessing their new territory, United States officials concluded that overpopulation was a significant issue, though Puerto Rico's population was less than one million in 1899. Anxieties about overpopulation, influenced by Malthusian thought, were common at this time. In 1901, after several years of military rule, the Foraker Act created a civilian administration on the island and established it as an unincorporated territory of the United States. By 1917, United States economic and political interventions on the island had led to increases in inequality and unemployment. While some trade unionists argued that labor exploitation was the cause of these problems, many United States policymakers continued to believe they were caused by overpopulation. (Note: Many modern scholars reject or qualify the idea that overpopulation caused Puerto Rico's economic problems during this period. Researcher Patience A. Schell argues that claims of overpopulation were "not based on empirical data" and that economic and political policies were actually to blame. Researcher Bonnie Mass argues that arguments pointing to the high birth rate on the island did not take into account "the economic situation of a colonized economy based on resource extraction" that "turned Puerto Rico’s working population into a marginal and surplus labor force". Another researcher, Susan G. Enberg, supports this assessment. Anthropologist Iris López argues that overpopulation was a problem but that overpopulation "does not exist in a vacuum", that it "occurs in relationship to economic production and to the kind and number of jobs available", and that therefore the island's overpopulation problem was itself caused by economic problems emerging from its colonial relationship with the United States.)

During the 1920s, a debate about birth control methods began in Puerto Rico. On the one hand, local feminists, socialists, and other activists founded The League for the Control of Natality and the Birth Control League of Puerto Rico to support birth control programs. These programs, they believed, would help reduce overpopulation and improve the lives of working class people. On the other hand, the Nationalist Party of Puerto Rico, led by Pedro Albizu Campos, argued that birth control aimed to impose Anglo-Saxon gender values on Puerto Rico by allowing women to inappropriately take control of families.

Throughout the early twentieth century, United States sugar producers displaced citrus, coffee, and tobacco (Note: Tobacco remained an influential crop, receiving tariff protections from the United States government, but sugar dominated.) growers to establish a monoculture system. When the international sugar market collapsed in the mid-1920s, the Puerto Rican economy was devastated. This was followed by the 1928 Okeechobee hurricane and the Great Depression, which exacerbated issues of unemployment and hunger. While Puerto Rico continued to produce export crops for the United States, its food system deteriorated. This caused American and Puerto Rican fears about overpopulation to grow even more. Many Puerto Ricans migrated to the mainland United States—about 58,000 between 1920 and 1940.

== History ==
=== 1930s ===
To provide relief for the devastated Puerto Rican economy, the Roosevelt administration established the Puerto Rican Emergency Relief Administration (PRERA) in 1933. The PRERA was succeeded by the Puerto Rico Reconstruction Administration (PRRA) in 1935. Analysts employed by the PRRA argued that population growth impeded its efforts to decrease unemployment. In 1936, the PRRA established a national health program that endorsed fertility control.

In 1937, due to concerns about health issues and overpopulation, the Legislative Assembly of Puerto Rico passed legislation promoting sterilization with support from local feminist activists. Numerous clinics offering sterilization and other birth control services were opened during the late 1930s. Many were operated by the Maternal and Child Health Association, which was founded by philanthropist Clarence Gamble, the heir to the Procter & Gamble soap fortune.

=== 1940s ===
After learning about Nazi human experimentation during World War II, the public began to view the term "negative eugenics" more unfavorably. However, concerns about overpopulation, as expressed by conservationists such as Henry Fairfield Osborn and William Vogt, grew during the postwar period. These authors blamed the war on overpopulation and the overexploitation of nature, condemned consumerism and the idea of unchecked economic growth, and warned that new Cold War foreign assistance programs like the Marshall Plan would lead to environmental devastation. In the United States, neo-Malthusian population control programs came to be seen as essential for addressing Third World poverty and, by extension, containing communism.

Amidst this new overpopulation discourse, the United States began Operation Bootstrap in Puerto Rico in 1945. The program's primary purpose was to industrialize the Puerto Rican economy by offering companies from the mainland United States incentives to establish manufacturing plants on the island. Another key aspect of the program was promoting population control measures. During this period, with support from United States, the Puerto Rican government opened 160 clinics and hospitals—all primarily for the purpose of providing sterilizations. By 1946, about 6.5% of all Puerto Rican women of childbearing age had been sterilized.

The Catholic Church opposed sterilization, with the bishop of San Juan arguing in 1947 that "the ostensible defenders of public health... have transgressed the limits of their competence and professional authority, pretending to resolve the economic problem of Puerto Rico [by] making it so there are fewer Puerto Ricans". While he worried about overpopulation, Luis Muñoz Marín of the Popular Democratic Party, who became Governor of Puerto Rico in 1949, also opposed sterilization, though he supported some private sterilization programs.

=== 1950s ===
By the 1950s, United States support for population control measures had grown even stronger. A number of birth clinics were established by The Puerto Rican Family Welfare Association (also known as Pro Familia). Founded by feminist activists Carmen Rivera de Alvarado and Celestina Zalduondo, Pro Familia was partially sponsored by Planned Parenthood and the Sunnen Foundation, a philanthropic vehicle run by American businessman Joseph Sunnen. Thousands of men and women were sterilized in Association clinics.

In general, population control efforts focused on sterilization over other means of birth control, with many practitioners arguing that non-permanent methods placed too much responsibility on Puerto Rican women. Some believed that Puerto Rican women lacked the capacity for effective bodily autonomy and self-determination. Others supported sterilization to support women's health and to alleviate poverty. Meanwhile, some women saw other birth control methods as dirty or immoral. Demographers argued that women sought out sterilization so they could seek employment in the newly industrialized economy without having to worry about raising children. By 1953, about 17% of Puerto Rican women of childbearing age had been sterilized.

=== 1960s ===
Under the Kennedy administration, the United States announced its support for family planning initiatives worldwide. After Kennedy's assassination, President Lyndon B. Johnson continued and expanded these initiatives. This expansion, which took place alongside Johnson's Great Society campaign, was influenced by the idea of a "culture of poverty", which was popularized by activist Michael Harrington and sociologist Oscar Lewis. Lewis argued that impoverished people shared certain traits that are passed from parents to their children. In his 1966 book La Vida; A Puerto Rican Family in the Culture of Poverty, Lewis uses Puerto Rico as a case study to support this idea, arguing that the experiences of Puerto Rican women show that impoverished people are culturally unable to save money or delay gratification.

Meanwhile, Operation Bootstrap transformed Puerto Rico's economy from one primarily based on agriculture to one primarily based on export-oriented manufacturing and industry. Jobs in agriculture were lost, and the industrial sector did not produce enough new jobs to make up for the shortfall. During the 1960s, many Puerto Ricans returned from the mainland United States to Puerto Rico due to adverse economic conditions. Puerto Rico also experienced a wave of immigration from Cuba and the Dominican Republic, and the social movements of the 1960s increased anxieties about youth radicalization. Amidst these changes, officials continued to argue that overpopulation was the root of Puerto Rico's problems. While the Catholic Church and its associated Christian Action Party continued to oppose sterilization, as did the Puerto Rican Independence and Puerto Rican Socialist Parties, 34% of Puerto Rican women of childbearing age had been sterilized by 1965, the majority in their early twenties.

During the late 1960s, the government made tubal ligations available to Puerto Rican women at free or reduced costs. Many of these tubal ligations were performed under duress and without informed consent. Social and economic factors, such as poverty, pressured Puerto Ricans to seek sterilizations. While most wealthy and middle-class Puerto Ricans preferred non-permanent birth control methods, others were unable to afford them. Tubal ligations were their only viable option. Many were also incorrectly told that future pregnancies would endanger their lives. In some cases, practitioners lied to women about the procedures they would undergo. They said they would tie the fallopian tubes, a reversible procedure by itself, but actually cut them as well, an irreversible procedure. Hospitals often had policies mandating that doctors pressure women into receiving tubal ligations. In addition, because men were sometimes incorrectly told that vasectomies were irreversible and would cause sexual dysfunction, they often pressured their wives to be sterilized instead.

=== 1970s ===
A number of studies and reports discussing the sterilization in Puerto Rico were released in the 1970s. One such study, commissioned by the United States Department of Defense in 1971, argued that, because preventing births increased per capita output, sterilizations could result in a US$12.5 million windfall for the Puerto Rican economy. A report outlining Puerto Rico's population control strategy was released in 1973. This report, endorsed by Governor Rafael Hernández Colón, called for birth control programs targeting "the groups with the least income and smallest amount of education". According to historian Laura Briggs, sterilizations were sharply curtailed during the early 1970s due to increased scrutiny from the federal government. However, a 1975 report by a group of visiting American doctors indicated that the sterilization rate was actually increasing at this time, particularly in private hospitals.

At the same time, opposition to coerced sterilizations was beginning to rise on the mainland. The Young Lords, a left-wing Puerto Rican political organization active in the United States, argued that the sterilizations were a form of genocide. Members of the Committee to End Sterilization Abuse (CESA) and Committee for Abortion Rights and Against Sterilization Abuse (CARASA) also opposed the practice, with the CESA calling the perceived Puerto Rican sterilization campaigns "one of the most insidious U.S. population control programs in the Third World". General opposition to United States-backed family planning programs also rose among American conservatives in the emerging anti-abortion movement.

=== 1980s ===
By 1982, about 39% of Puerto Rican women of childbearing age were sterilized, with sterilization accounting for 58% of birth control methods used. The sterilization rate in Puerto Rico was much higher than in the mainland United States, with a 1985 report from Population Today stating that Puerto Rico had "the highest rate of sterilization acceptance in the world". However, opposition to family planning accelerated under the Reagan administration. Many members of Reagan's New Right coalition supported curtailing abortion, sterilization, reproductive health services, and coercive practices employed by family planning programs. As part of the Mexico City policy, the Reagan administration cut funding to several major population planning and reproductive health organizations in the mid-1980s. This policy remained in place throughout the Reagan and Bush administrations. Despite this, private sector support for family planning programs increased substantially during this period.

=== 1990s and decline ===
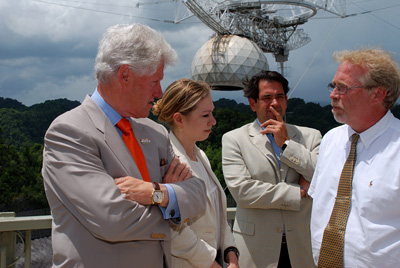
Bill Clinton in Arecibo, Puerto Rico

After Bill Clinton became president in 1993, his administration rescinded the Mexico City policy; worked to bring together environmentalists, population control advocates, and reproductive rights advocates; and played a significant role in the 1994 International Conference on Population and Development in Cairo. The program for this conference, released in February of that year, condemned coercive measures in family planning as a human rights violation and argued that coercion, demographic targets, and incentive systems were inappropriate for family planning. According to researcher Paige Whaley Eager, this represented a shift in the mainstream family planning movement towards a paradigm of reproductive rights and health. In Puerto Rico, opposition to sterilization rose as many young women began to favor other methods of contraception such as condoms, oral contraceptives, and calendar-based contraceptive methods. Sterilization rates began to decline, dropping to 48% of birth control methods used by 1996.

== Legacy and historiography ==
Many in Puerto Rico are aware that sterilizations were common on the island, but specific knowledge is inconsistent. In a 2020 study performed by researcher Maria E. Sotomayor, several interviewees discussed their understanding of the practice. Several noted that the topic is under-discussed in Puerto Rican society, particularly at the university level, though one noted that it was more commonly addressed on social media websites like Facebook. Meanwhile, one Puerto Rican health scientist argued that in "our current political and economic situation, people are more aware of these things", comparing the growing knowledge about the sterilizations to the growing knowledge about the Ponce massacre. One woman referred to the sterilizations as a form of "conquest", arguing that health officials saw Puerto Ricans as "just an experiment".

Per Sotomayor, modern attitudes towards sterilization on the island are mixed. Despite coming from different political and religious backgrounds, most respondents argued that the government should not be involved in family planning decisions at all. Sotomayor also notes a generational gap, arguing that women from younger generations are generally more assertive in making decisions about their reproductive health.

=== Historiography ===
Many works have been produced about United States sterilization policies in Puerto Rico. Studies discussing the number of sterilizations on the island began to appear during the late 1940s and 1950s. Many articles from this period (Note: See Stycos and Kihss.) emphasize the stigma experienced by women who underwent sterilization or used other forms of birth control. During the 1970s, the focus began to shift to the high incidence of sterilization on the island, with demographer Harriet Presser reporting on sterilization rates in her 1971 manuscript Sterilization and Fertility Decline in Puerto Rico and arguing that a "demographic transition" was taking place. This continued into the 1980s and 1990s.

Works critical of the sterilizations also began to emerge during the 1970s, continuing to the 2020s. These include the Young Lords's "Position Paper on Women"; Bonnie Mass's Population Target and "Puerto Rico: A Case Study of Population Control"; Angela Davis's Women, Race and Class; Ana María García's documentary La Operación; and Annette B. Ramírez de Arellano and Conrad Seipp's Colonialism, Catholicism, and Contraception. Laura Briggs's Reproducing Empire and Iris López's Matters of Choice also discuss the practice.

Some debate whether there was an intentional campaign to coerce Puerto Rican women to become sterilized. Mass argues that there was a "genocidal campaign" of mass sterilization. Briggs contests this, arguing that most of Puerto Rico's population was rural while most of its medical infrastructure was urban. Because of this, Briggs argues, Puerto Rico was unable to wage a serious campaign to coerce women into limiting their reproduction against their will. She also notes that statistical data indicate that most Puerto Rican women who underwent sterilization were satisfied with the procedure. However, she acknowledges some sterilizations were likely coerced during the late 1960s and early 1970s. Briggs's argument is itself contested by Sotomayor, who argues that the Maternal and Child Health Association opened several rural healthcare clinics in the 1930s and that industrialization under Operation Bootstrap coincided with an increase in sterilizations. Researcher Susan G. Enberg argues that the existence of eugenics campaigns in the mainland United States supports the claim that a similar campaign might have occurred in Puerto Rico but that evidence is insufficient to support the existence of a systematic, genocidal negative eugenics campaign.

There is also debate about the relationship of sterilization policy to United States colonialism and imperialism in Puerto Rico. Mass characterizes the sterilizations as a form of "imperialist social control". Sotomayor argues that, in pursuing sterilization as a policy, the United States attempted to exploit the Puerto Rican people by imposing "an imperialist, Protestant system" of population control measures on them. Meanwhile, Briggs argues that the mainland feminist emphasis on "forced" sterilization is itself a form of colonial dominance. She argues that when mainland feminists attempt to speak on behalf of Puerto Ricans, they fail to take into account Puerto Rican women's agency and their motives for pursuing sterilization.

== Sources ==
- Ayala, César J.; Bernabe, Rafael (2007). Puerto Rico in the American Century. Chapel Hill: University of North Carolina Press. doi:10.5149/9780807895535_ayala. ISBN 978-0-8078-3113-7. JSTOR 10.5149/9780807895535_ayala.
- Bashford, Alison; Levine, Philippa, eds. (2010). The Oxford Handbook of the History of Eugenics. Oxford: Oxford University Press. doi:10.1093/oxfordhb/9780195373141.001.0001. ISBN 978-0-19-970653-2.
  - Levine, Philippa; Bashford, Alison. "Introduction: Eugenics and the Modern World". In Bashford & Levine (2010), pp. 3-24.
  - Klausen, Susanne; Bashford, Alison. "Fertility Control: Eugenics, Neo-Malthusianism, and Feminism". In Bashford & Levine (2010), pp. 98-115.
  - Schell, Patience A. "Eugenics Policy and Practice in Cuba, Puerto Rico, and Mexico". In Bashford & Levine (2010), pp. 477-492.
- Bourgois, Phillippe (2015). "Culture of Poverty" (PDF). In Wright, James D. (ed.). International Encyclopedia of the Social & Behavioral Sciences. Vol. 18. Amsterdam: Elsevier. pp. 719–721. doi:10.1016/B978-0-08-097086-8.12048-3. ISBN 978-0-08-097087-5.
- Briggs, Laura (2002). Reproducing Empire: Race, Sex, Science, and U.S. Imperialism in Puerto Rico. Berkeley: University of California Press. ISBN 0-520-22255-5. JSTOR 10.1525/j.ctt1pncqs.
- Briggs, Laura (2024). "Becoming 'Welfare Island': Reproductive Labor and Racial Capitalism in Twentieth-Century Puerto Rico". History of the Present. 14 (1): 50–80. doi:10.1215/21599785-10898352. ISSN 2159-9785.
- Cabán, Pedro (2005). "Colonialism in Puerto Rico". In Oboler, Suzanne; González, Deena J. (eds.). The Oxford Encyclopedia of Latinos and Latinas in the United States. Oxford University Press.
- Cabán, Pedro (2021). "Puerto Rico in Crisis and the Shifting Dictates of Empire". Centro Journal. 33 (1): 7–40.
- Convention on the Prevention and Punishment of the Crime of Genocide (Treaty). United Nations General Assembly. 1948. Paris.
- Critchlow, Donald T. (1995). "Birth Control, Population Control, and Family Planning: An Overview". Journal of Policy History. 7 (1): 1–21. doi:10.1017/S0898030600004127. ISSN 0898-0306.
- Enberg, Susan G. (2015). "Puerto Rico: Sterile Breeding Grounds for Coercion and Uniformed Consent". Caribbean Quilt. 3: 75. doi:10.33137/caribbeanquilt.v3i1.22596. ISSN 1929-235X.
- Jaffe, Frederick S.; Polgar, Steven (1968). "Family Planning and Public Policy: Is the 'Culture of Poverty' the New Cop-Out?". Journal of Marriage and the Family. 30 (2): 228. doi:10.2307/349248.
- Kihss, Peter (1958). "PUERTO RICO FINDS DIP IN BIRTH RATE; Family Plan Aide Calls Drop a Result of Migration and Increase in Sterilization". New York Times.
- Lopez, Iris (2008). Matters of Choice: Puerto Rican Women's Struggle for Reproductive Freedom. New Brunswick: Rutgers University Press. ISBN 978-0-8135-4624-7. JSTOR j.ctt5hj277.
- Mass, Bonnie (1977). "Puerto Rico: a Case Study of Population Control". Latin American Perspectives. 4 (4): 66–82. doi:10.1177/0094582X7700400405. ISSN 0094-582X.
- Enck-Wanzer, Darrel, ed. (2010) [1970]. "Young Lords Position Paper on Women". The Young Lords: A Reader (PDF). New York; London: NYU Press. pp. 169–174. ISBN 978-0-8147-2241-1.
- Nelson, Jennifer (2001). "'Abortions under Community Control': Feminism, Nationalism, and the Politics of Reproduction among New York City's Young Lords". Journal of Women's History. 13 (1): 157–180. doi:10.1353/jowh.2001.0031. ISSN 1527-2036.
- Peterson, Herbert B. (2008). "Sterilization". Obstetrics & Gynecology. 111 (1): 189–203. doi:10.1097/01.AOG.0000298621.98372.62. ISSN 0029-7844.
- Ramírez de Arellano, Annette B.; Seipp, Conrad (2011). Colonialism, Catholicism, and Contraception: A History of Birth Control in Puerto Rico. ISBN 978-0-8078-9757-7. OCLC 1100844577.
- Robertson, Thomas (2012). The Malthusian Moment: Global Population Growth and the Birth of American Environmentalism. New Brunswick: Rutgers University Press. ISBN 978-0-8135-5335-1.
- Ross, Andrew (2011). "'Nothing Gained by Overcrowding': The History and Politics of Urban Population Control". In Bridge, Gary; Watson, Sophie (eds.). The New Blackwell Companion to the City. Malden: Wiley-Blackwell. pp. 169–178. ISBN 978-1-4051-8981-1.
- Sotomayor, Maria E. (2020). Reproductive Rights in Puerto Rico: Sterilization, Contraception, and Reproductive Violence (PhD thesis). Milwaukee: University of Wisconsin–Milwaukee.
- Stone, Glenn Davis (2021). "Malthusian thought". Oxford Research Encyclopedia of Anthropology. Oxford University Press. doi:10.1093/acrefore/9780190854584.013.312.
- Stycos, J. Mayone (1954). "Female sterilization in Puerto Rico". Eugenics Quarterly. 1 (3): 176–181. doi:10.1080/19485565.1954.9987171. ISSN 0097-2762.
- Waller, John C. (2001). "Ideas of heredity, reproduction and eugenics in Britain, 1800–1875". Studies in History and Philosophy of Science Part C: Studies in History and Philosophy of Biological and Biomedical Sciences. 32 (3): 457–489. doi:10.1016/S1369-8486(00)00028-5.
- Whalen, Carmen Teresa (2005). "Colonialism, Citizenship, and the Making of the Puerto Rican Diaspora: An Introduction". In Whalen, Carmen Teresa; Vázquez-Hernández, Víctor (eds.). The Puerto Rican Diaspora: Historical Perpsectives. Philadelphia: Temple University Press. pp. 1–42. ISBN 1-59213-412-2. JSTOR j.ctt14bt09b.
- Whaley Eager, Paige (2004). Global Population Policy: From Population Control to Reproductive Rights. Aldershot; Burlington: Ashgate. doi:10.4324/9781315254180. ISBN 0-7546-4162-7.
