= George Lipsitz =

American scholar

George Lipsitz is a Black Studies scholar and professor emeritus at the University of California, Santa Barbara. He is the author of several books, including The Possessive Investment in Whiteness, and has studied social movements, urban culture, inequality, the politics of popular culture, and whiteness studies. In addition to The Possessive Investment in Whiteness, he has written Midnight at the Barrelhouse, Footsteps in the Dark, A Life in the Struggle, Time Passages, Dangerous Crossroads, American Studies in a Moment of Danger, Rainbow at Midnight, Sidewalks of St. Louis, Class & Culture in Cold War America and How Racism Takes Place.

Lipsitz served as chair of the board of directors of the African American Policy Forum and was on the board of the National Fair Housing Alliance. He edits the Critical American Studies series for University of Minnesota Press, and co-edits the American Crossroads series for University of California Press with Earl Lewis, George J. Sánchez, Laura Briggs, and Nikhil Pal Singh. Lipsitz is Jewish.

== See also ==
- Whiteness studies
