= Kramo =

Kramo is a surname. Notable people with the surname include:

- Fadika Kramo-Lanciné (born 1948), Ivorian film director
- Marie-Ange Kramo (born 1979), French footballer
