= What Did You Do in the War, Thanasis? =

What did you do in the war, Thanasis? Τι έκανες στον πόλεμο, Θανάση;
- Directed by: Dinos Katsouridis
- Written by: Dinos Katsouridis
- Produced by: Dinos Katsouridis
- Starring: Thanasis Veggos; Antonis Papadopoulos; Katerina Gogou; Nikitas Platis
- Music by: Mimis Plessas
- Release date: December 24, 1971
- Running time: 85 minutes
- Country: Greece
- Language: Greek

What did you do in the war, Thanasis? (Greek: Τι έκανες στον πόλεμο, Θανάση;, romanized: Ti ekanes ston polemo, Thanasi?) is a 1971 Greek satirical drama film. It starred Thanasis Veggos as Thanasis, a poor labourer trying to survive during the Axis occupation of Greece. With references to the Great Famine (Greece) and the Greek resistance, the film was also a political allegory for the Greek military junta of 1967–1974. It won the Best Film Award at the Thessaloniki International Film Festival.

== Plot ==
The film begins in the factory where Thanasis works, which is owned by the Germans. On his way home, he passes by the tavern where he gets his food. There he smells meat. The tavern owner refuses and Thanasis runs away. On the way, the Nazis were chasing a Greek patriot. Thanasis, terrified, starts running too, until at one point the food he got from the tavern starts falling all over the place. Some children eat it and a man takes the saucepan from him. Thanasis goes to the tavern again to get food. This time, however, he sees meat on the toothpick of the tavern customer. Furious, Thanasis enters the tavern and starts licking the plates. At that moment, a lady bursts in with a policeman and accuses the tavern owner of cooking her cat. Then, Thanasis' sister convinces him to go to court to testify falsely, as they need the tavern keeper.

After being convicted of false testimony, Thanasis is mistakenly taken to the prison for political prisoners. There, he meets Greek resistance fighters, who tell him about the notorious Ivan, a hero of the resistance. In a short time, the Italians bring Ivan too. He helps the patriots escape, with Thanasis staying behind. The Italians, who were waiting for a Nazi officer to interrogate Ivan, finally give him Thanasis, saying that he is Ivan. Thanasis is tortured severely. Then, he manages to escape with the help of some prostitutes, who dress him up as a woman, and he follows them to the Syngrou hospital. There the doctor lets him go, after the intervention of Danae, one of the prostitutes. Thanasis begins to have feelings for this girl.

However, Thanasis' sister, who participated in the resistance without her brother knowing, puts the resistance newspaper Eleftherotis in his pot and they arrange with a resistance member to go and pick them up from where Thanasis leaves them. One day this worker is arrested and Eleftherotis stays in Thanasis' pot. Danae, who had helped him escape, helps him again, warning him about the contents of the pot. Thanasis loses them, and by all means, tries to get rid of the newspapers. In his attempt, he throws them into a cage and then, the German officer Hans distributes sardines with the paper of this newspaper. The German officer chases them both.

They are finally caught. Thanasis is arrested again as Ivan. In prison, the Germans kill Hans and Thanasis, who is trying to escape, finds a German uniform and puts it on. Then, without realizing it, they all go to Thanasis' house together to catch Ivan again. Thanasis runs to be the first to notify his sister, who was listening to the radio. Then he takes it, wraps it in a blanket and leaves. On the stairs, however, he falls and the radio turns on. The film ends with Thanasis passing between the German soldiers, while the Greek national anthem is heard from the radio speakers.

== Cast ==
- Thanasis Veggos as Thanasis Karathanasis
- Katerina Gogou as Froso Karathanasi
- Antonis Papadopoulos as Hans
- Efi Roditi as Danae
- Nikitas Platis as Thodoros
- Mihalis Giannatos as Italian officer
- Stelios Lionakis as Ivan
- Kaiti Lambropoulou as Cleopatra
- Giannis Firios as judge
- Dinos Doulgerakis as lawyer
- Kostas Stavrinoudakis as electric company worker

== Production ==
The film's sound engineer was Takis Kontos, while the assistant director was Sasha Venieri. Part of the film was shot at the Neo Faliro Steam Power Station.

== Reception ==
The film was honored with 3 awards at the 1971 Thessaloniki Film Festival (artistic film, screenplay and leading male role), and is considered one of the best films of Thanasis Vengos and Dinos Katsouridis, while it is also considered important for Greek cinema, as it marked the change in Thanasis Vengos' film roles, his films and his roles since then acquired a different content. After the screening at the Thessaloniki festival, the audience lifted Vengos in their arms, carrying him around and cheering.
