= Woman of the Port =

Woman of the Port (originally La mujer del puerto in Spanish) can refer to:

- The Woman of the Port (1934 film), a 1934 Mexican film by Arcady Boytler and Raphael J. Sevilla
- The Woman of the Port (1949 film), a 1949 Mexican film by Emilio Gómez Muriel
- Woman of the Port (1991 film), a 1991 Mexican film by Arturo Ripstein
