= Gregorio (film) =

1980s Peruvian film

- Original film poster
- Directed by: Fernando Espinoza; Stefan Kaspar; Alejandro Legaspi
- Screenplay by: María Barea; Fernando Espinoza; Stefan Kaspar; Alejandro Legaspi; Susana Pastor
- Produced by: María Barea
- Starring: Marino León de la Torre; Vetzi Pérez Palma; Augusto Varillas; Manuel Acosta Ojeda; Rafael Hernández
- Cinematography: Fernando Espinoza
- Music by: Arturo Ruiz del Pozo
- Production company: Grupo Chaski
- Release date: March 7, 1985
- Running time: 85 minutes
- Country: Peru
- Language: Spanish

Gregorio is a 1985 Peruvian drama film produced by Grupo Chaski, which was founded in 1982 by Alejandro Legaspi, Stefan Kaspar, Fernando Espinoza, Fernando Barreto and María Barea.

Marino León de la Torre stars as Gregorio, a Quechua boy who migrates with his family from a small village in the Andes to the capital of Lima, where he experiences the cultural clash between the Andean world and the chaotic and violent urban world.

In 2019, the restoration of the films Gregorio and Juliana by Guarango was announced, and their subsequent re-release at the Lima Film Festival.

== Plot ==
Gregorio's father decides to leave his village to look for a better life in the city. After getting a job, he calls the rest of the family (Gregorio and his wife) but, soon after, he loses his job and falls ill. Homeless, the three are forced to take part in an invasion of Villa El Salvador where they settle. Soon after, their father dies, forcing Gregorio to work on the streets as a shoeshine boy. At first, he remains close to his mother; however, when she starts a new relationship with a neighbour, Gregorio feels betrayed and distances himself from her. He then joins a group of street children who live together in an abandoned tram: Chollo, Tachuela, Retacito and Gitano, who work as street performers while committing thefts. In their company, Gregorio ventures into the criminal side of street life.

== Awards ==
- FICC Award; Jury Mention and OCIC Mention at the VI Havana Film Festival, Cuba 1984.
- Best Director and Best Acting Award at the II Bogota Film Festival, Colombia 1985.
- 'Medio Exterior' Award at the XI International Ibero-American Film Festival, Madrid, Spain 1985.
- Best film reflecting the socio-cultural reality of a country Award, at the XI International Ibero-American Film Festival, Madrid 1985.
- 'Chasqui' Award at the VIII Film Festival, Quito, Ecuador 1986.
- Jury Prize at the Third World Film Festival, Switzerland 1986.

== Sequel ==
The 1995 film Anda, corre, vuela brought together Gregorio and Juliana, titular characters from previous Grupo Chasqui films, as young adults navigating the tumultuous social landscape of Lima during the Shining Path insurgency. Their meeting and subsequent romance provided a poignant backdrop to the tense political climate of the era.
