= Daniel Wachsmann =

Israeli film director (born 1946)

- דניאל וקסמן
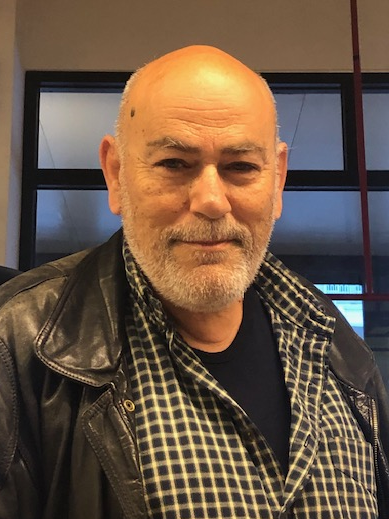
- Born: 1946 (age 79–80); Shanghai, Republic of China
- Occupations: Film director, Television director, Actor, Film producer, Screenwriter
- Years active: 1974–present

Daniel Wachsmann (Hebrew: דניאל וקסמן; born 1946) is an Israeli filmmaker, writer, producer and director, best known for his critically acclaimed film "Khamsin".

== Biography ==
Daniel Wachsmann was born in 1946 in Shanghai, Republic of China, to Jewish parents who had fled Nazi persecution during World War II. In 1948, his family immigrated to Israel with him and he grew up in Tel Aviv.

After serving in the Israeli Defense Forces Wachsmann studied theater at the Beit Zvi School of Performing Arts and later pursued film studies in London.

Wachsmann began his career in filmmaking in the 1970s, initially directing two short films. In 1974, his short film "My Father" won the first prize at the International Film Festival in Mannheim, Germany. Three years later, his short film "Eliora" received a citation at the International Short Film Festival in Oberhausen.

In 1979, Wachsmann made his feature film debut with "Transit", which was selected for the official competition at the 30th Berlin International Film Festival.

In 1980 he directed the film "Silver Rose" and in 1981 he directed the film "David's Violin".

His breakthrough came in 1982 with "Khamsin", a drama addressing the complexities of Arab-Jewish relations in Israel. The film was nominated for the Academy Award for Best Foreign Language Film, won the Silver Panther Prize at the Locarno Film Festival, received an Honorable Mention at the Strasbourg Film Festival, and it was later selected by Israeli film critics as the Film of the Decade.

In 1986 Wachsmann directed the short film "Red Cow" which was showcased at international film festivals. His 1989 feature "The Intended" won the prestigious Wolgin Prize at the Jerusalem Film Festival and was also screened at the Cannes and Shanghai International Film Festivals.

Throughout the 1990s and 2000s Wachsmann continued producing films that explored Israeli history, culture, and political conflicts. In 1996, his film "Song of the Galil" won the Golden Anchor Prize at the Haifa International Film Festival and the Silver Hugo Prize at the Chicago International Film Festival. The following year, he directed the documentary "The Stone and the Olive Tree", which explored the impact of the First Intifada. In 1999, his film "Menelik, the Black Jewish Prince" won the New Century Prize at the Jerusalem Film Festival. In 2000 he directed the film "Across From the Forests". In 2002 he directed the film "Bar Mitzvah", and in 2004 he directed the film "Letters from Rishikesh". His most recent film, "Acre Dreams", was released in 2018.

== Filmography ==
=== Director ===
Year	International title	Hebrew title	Notes
1974	My Father	Avi, אבי	Short film. First Prize at the International Film Festival, Mannheim, Germany
1977	Eliora	Eliora, אלוירה	Short film. Citation at International Short Film Festival Oberhausen
1979	Transit	Transit, טרנזיט	Formal competition at the 30th Berlin International Film Festival
1980	Silver Rose	Vered HaKesef, ורד הכסף	
1981	David's Violin	Kinor David, כינור דוד	
1982	Khamsin	Hamsin, חמסין	Nominated in competition for Oscar Foreign Films; Silver Panther Prize at the Locarno Film Festival, Switzerland; Honorable Mention at Strasbourg; selected by Israeli film critics as the Film of the Decade
1986	Red Cow	Para Aduma, פרה אדומה	Short film. Shown in international film festivals
1989	The Intended	HaMeyu'ad, המיועד	Wolgin Prize, Jerusalem Film Festival; Cannes Film Festival; Shanghai International Film Festival
1996	Song of the Galilee	Shirat HaGalil, שירת הגליל	Golden Anchor Prize, Haifa International Film Festival; Silver Hugo Prize, Chicago International Film Festival
1997	The Stone and the Olive Tree	HaEven VeEtz HaZayit, האבן ועץ הזית	Documentary about the First Intifada
1999	Menelik, the Black Jewish Prince	Menelik Nasich Yehudi Shachor, מנליק נסיך יהודי שחור	New Century Prize, Jerusalem Film Festival
2000	Across From the Forests	Mul HaYaarot, מול היערות	
2002	Bar Mitzvah	Bar Mitzvah, בר מצווה	
2004	Letters from Rishikesh	Michtavim MeRishikesh, מכתבים מרישיקש	TV movie
2018	Acre Dreams	Akko Chalomot, עכו חלומות	

=== Writer ===
Year	International title	Hebrew title	Notes
1979	Transit	Transit, טרנזיט	
1982	Khamsin	Hamsin, חמסין	
1989	The Intended	HaMeyu'ad, המיועד	
1996	Song of the Galilee	Shirat HaGalil, שירת הגליל	
1999	Menelik, the Black Jewish Prince	Menelik Nasich Yehudi Shachor, מנליק נסיך יהודי שחור	
2002	Bar Mitzvah	Bar Mitzvah, בר מצווה	
2004	Letters from Rishikesh	Michtavim MeRishikesh, מכתבים מרישיקש	
2018	Acre Dreams	Akko Chalomot, עכו חלומות	

=== Actor ===
Year	International title	Hebrew title	Role	Notes
1978	Rockinghorse	Sus-Etz, סוסעץ		
1982	Big Shots	Mitachat La'af, מתחת לאף		
1984	On a Clear Day You Can See Damascus	Beyom Bahir Ro'im Et Damesek, ביום בהיר רואים את דמשק	Terrorist	
2018	Acre Dreams	Akko Chalomot, עכו חלומות	Dani	
