= The Brickmakers =

The Brickmakers, aka Chircales
- Re-release poster
- Directed by: Marta Rodriguez, Jorge Silva
- Written by: Marta Rodriguez
- Release date: 1972
- Running time: 42 minutes
- Country: Colombia
- Language: Spanish

The Brickmakers, originally released under the title Chircales, is a Colombian documentary film released in 1972. It was directed by Marta Rodriguez, who also wrote the script, and her husband, Jorge Silva, and filmed from 1966 to 1972. It tells the story of the Castañeda family who eke out a meager living making bricks on the outskirts of Bogotá.

== Summary ==
The film, presented in black and white, depicts the life of the Castañeda family, a married couple (Alfredo and Maria) and their 11 children, as brickmakers in the Tunjuelo River valley to the south of Bogotá. It was filmed over the course of six years from 1966 to 1972. The film examines multiple issues, including: the exploitation and inequality of power between landowner, boss, and worker; the grueling and dehumanizing working conditions; the use of children as beasts of burden in hauling bricks from the time they are able to walk; the absence of systems to protect the workers (including protection from carbon monoxide released by the kilns); the unavailability of birth control (the mother is pregnant with her 12th child); the lack of education and basic services; the role of religion in the family's life; the family's vulnerability to having their work destroyed by the rains; and physical abuse by the family's father, Alfredo.

At the end of the film, the Castañeda family is ordered off the land by the owner. They leave with nothing of their own other than a few possessions. The film closes with the words, "The struggle is long. Let's start now."

== Reception ==
Chircales won the Golden Dove (Paloma de oro) at the Leipzig Documentary Film Festival in 1972. It also won the Grand Priae at the Tampere International Film Festival in 1973.

It was the first of seven documentaries made by Rodriguez and Silva. In "The Colombia Reader: History, Culture, Politics", the authors called it "still one of the most eloquent Colombian documentaries in its description of social and political reality" and "a model of committed filmmaking and of documentary work understood as a tool for creating consciousness and influence toward change." They opined that the real subject of the film is "the absolute, pathetic poverty of the campesino brickmakers."
