= Marta Rodríguez =

Colombian documentary filmmaker

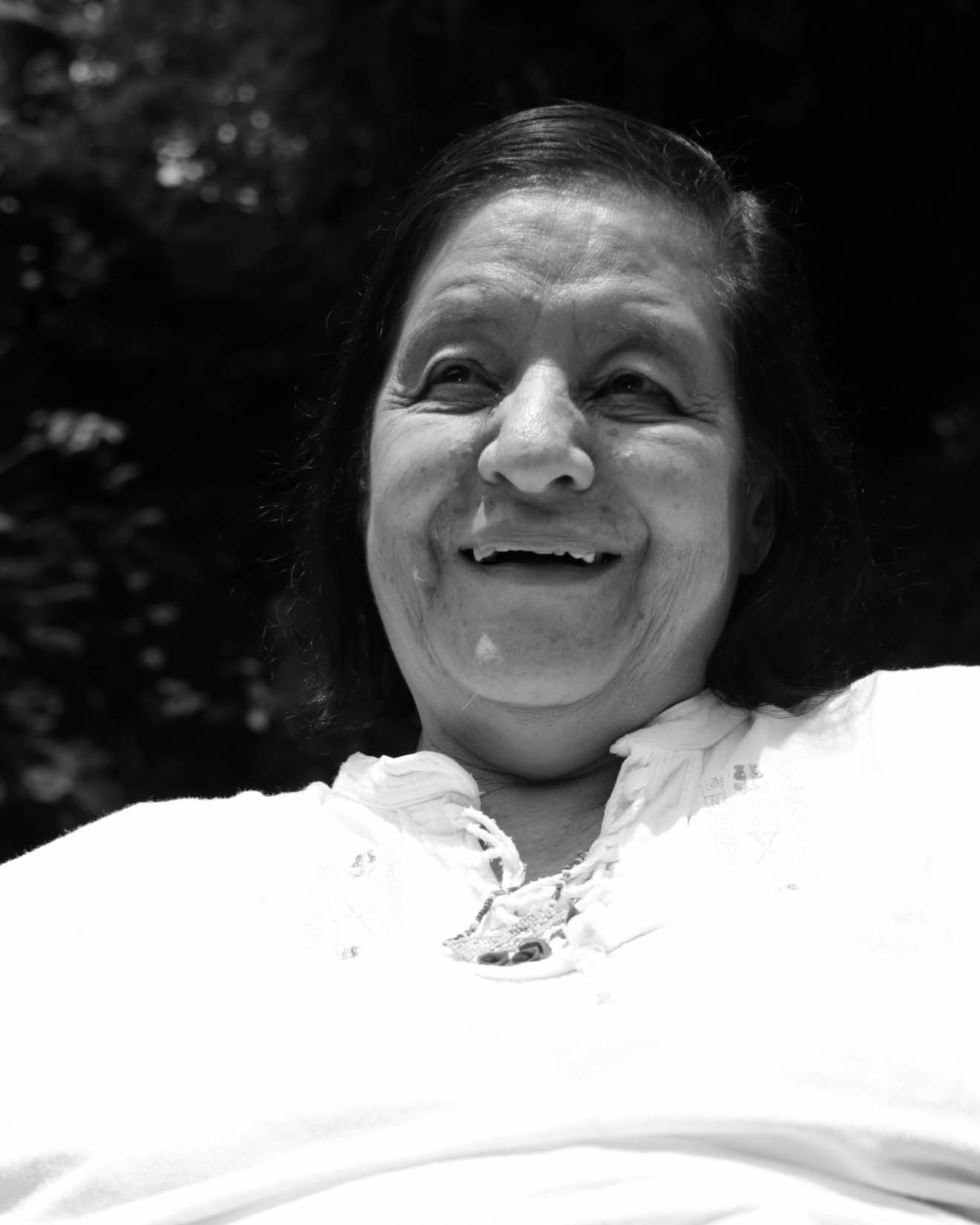
- Born: 1 December 1933 (age 92); Bogotá, Colombia
- Occupation: Documentary filmmaker
- Notable work: Chircales (1972); Campesinos (1975); Nuestra voz de tierra, memoria y futura (1982)
- Spouse: Jorge Silva

Marta Rodríguez (born 1 December 1933) is a prolific Colombian documentary filmmaker, producer, director, and writer. Rodríguez was married to Jorge Silva, who served as co-director on many of their projects. Her notable films include Chircales (1972), Campesinos (1975), and Nuestra voz de tierra, memoria y futuro (1982). Her works focuses on the lives and experiences of Colombia's working class. She is considered a pioneer of anthropological documentary filmmaking in Latin America.

== Biography ==
Marta Rodríguez was born on 1 December 1933 in Bogotá, Colombia, and became the youngest daughter of the widowed mother of 4. According to Rodríguez, her mother came from a poor village and worked as a teacher in a country school. Her father, on the contrary, was a successful coffee exporter. He died unexpectedly when Marta was still in womb. In 1953, the mother sold a family farm and took the family to Spain so that all her children could study there. In 1957, Rodríguez went to Paris, where she met a priest Antonio Hortelano. Through him, she found employment at the La Roquette women's prison. While helping Hortelano with Spanish itinerant workers, she saw the scenes that made her want to create movies. When she returned to Bogotá in 1958, in a small cineclub she met Jorge Silva, her future husband and cinematographer of all her films (Note: Silva was born in Girardot, Colombia, in 1941, in a very poor village, he never had a father. He had changed numerous jobs until he started collaborating with the Associated Press as a journalist. Working as a photographer and a reporter, he developed an interest in filmmaking. In 1963 he released his debut, Días de Papel.).

In Colombia, Rodríguez entered the National University and studied sociology under Camilo Torres, who influenced her greatly and shaped her social and political views. In 1961, Rodríguez went back to Paris and enrolled in a program of studies at the Musée de l'Homme. In 1962-64, she studied ethnographic film classes with Jean Rouch. When she got back to Colombia in 1965, she pursued fllmmaking. Jorge Silva, who already had some experience in filmmaking, became her cinematographer, up until his death in 1987 they were partners and co-creators.

== Career ==
Over her five-decade career, Rodríguez has directed over eighteen films, written ten, and produced four movies. Her films focus on the living and working conditions of the lower socio-economic working class of Colombia, with an emphasis on indigenous and native peoples. Usually, her documentaries take several years to produce not only due to limited budgets, but more importantly because they require anthropological investigation and analyses. She always made sure that the documentary was turned back to its subjects so that they could debate it, reflect it and transform their lives.

The 1960s and the 1970s were the decades of militant films — politically and socially charged documentaries. In the 1980s, Rodríguez and Silva felt that that genre was exhausted and lost its expressive power. Gradually they progressed into making "documentalized fiction" with an entire mythical dimension, at that point they started using actors.

After the death of Silva in 1987, Rodríguez remained active as a director. She focused on work with indigenous communities of Colombia.

Since 2019, Rodríguez has been focused on archive materials and produced documentaries based on the research made in the 1970s.

=== Chircales ===
Chircales is a documentary film about a family of bricklayers living in Bogotá. It was filmed across a period of six years between 1966 and 1972. Chircales highlights the religious, social and political experiences of the Castañeda family to expose the exploitation faced by those of similar low class and social standing.

The film was screened at numerous international film festivals and received many awards, including the Golden Dove for the Best Film at the Leipzig International Film Festival, FIPRESCI Best Film Award, etc.

=== Campesinos ===
Campesinos is a 1975 documentary directed by Rodríguez centering on the Colombian indigenous farmers movement in the early years of the 1970s. Campesinos documents the injustices peasant workers endure working on coffee farms due to their indigenous cultural identities.

=== Nuestra voz de tierra, memoria y futuro. ===
Nuestra voz de tierra, memoria y futuro is a 1982 documentary film directed by Rodríguez and Silva. Rodríguez focuses on the Coconuco indigenous community of Colombia in their struggle to maintain their culture and land in the face of encroaching developed civilization. Andean culture was eroding due to external pressure forcing the symbolic and literal eradication of a people trying to preserve their ways of life. Rodríguez highlights the myths, legends, and traditions important to Coconuco culture, and unfortunately at risk of erasure due to modernization.

=== Amor, mujeres y flores ===
Amor, mujeres y flores is a 1988 documentary film directed by Rodríguez and Silva. This film highlights the dangerous working conditions of women in the Colombian flower industry. Colombia is one of the main international suppliers of flowers to the United States, yet the environments in which thousands of Colombian women work are incredibly dangerous and hazardous to their health. The film emphasizes the detrimental effects of exposure to pesticide which several workers reveal have caused headaches, blindness, miscarriage and even cancer. The movie was financially supported by the Interamerican Foundation and the British Channel Four. With the Amor, mujeres y flores, Rodríguez and Silva toured Germany with a campaign against pesticides and the chemical companies, such as Bayer.

== Filmography ==
- 1971 — Planas: testimonio de un etnocidio
- 1972 — Chircales;
- 1975 — Campesinos
- 1981 — La voz de los sobrevivientes
- 1982 — Nuestra voz de tierra, memoria y futuro
- 1987 — Nacer de nuevo
- 1988 — Amor, mujeres y flores
- 1992 — Memoria viva
- 1998 — Amapola, flor maldita
- 1999 — Los hijos del trueno
- 2001 — Nunca más
- 2002 — La hoja sagrada
- 2004 — Una casa sola se vence
- 2006 — Soraya: amor no es olvido
- 2009 — Testigos de un etnocidio
- 2012 — No hay dolor ajeno
- 2015 — La Toma del Milenio
- 2019 — La sinfónica de los Andes
- 2022 — Camilo Torres Restrepo, El Amor Eficaz

== Sources ==
- Farnsworth-Alvear, Ann; Palacios, Marco; Gómez López, Ana María (2016). The Colombia Reader: History, Culture, Politics. Duke University Press. ISBN 9780822373865.
- Burton, Julianne (2010). Cinema and Social Change in Latin America: Conversations with Filmmakers. University of Texas Press. ISBN 978-0-292-79163-3.
- Coryat, Diana; León, Christian; Zweig, Noah (2023). Small Cinemas of the Andes: New Aesthetics, Practices and Platforms. Springer Nature. ISBN 978-3-031-32018-7.
