= Transit (1980 film) =

1980 film

- Directed by: Daniel Wachsmann
- Written by: Daniel Wachsmann; Daniel Horowitz
- Produced by: Jacob Goldwasser
- Starring: Itzhak Ben-Zur
- Cinematography: Ilan Rosenberg
- Edited by: Asher Tlalim
- Release date: February 1980 (Berlin)
- Running time: 87 minutes
- Country: Israel
- Language: Hebrew

Transit is a 1980 Israeli drama film directed by Daniel Wachsmann. It was entered into the 30th Berlin International Film Festival. This is Daniel Wachsmann's first full-length film, which he co-wrote with Danny Horowitz. It is also the first film to be produced with the support of the Israeli Film Fund.

The plot follows a Jewish man who escapes Nazi Germany and, after passing through Italy and Shanghai, arrives in Israel. However, he struggles to adapt and views Israel as another temporary place, similar to his previous experiences, rather than a true homeland. The story is set in Tel Aviv after the Six-Day War.

The film was screened at various prestigious festivals, including the Berlin Film Festival, Toronto Film Festival, Cape Town Film Festival, Filmex in Los Angeles, and the Sydney Film Festival in 1980.

== Plot ==
The film is partially narrated by the main character's son, who reflects on his father after he has left.

Erich Nosbaum (Gedalia Besser) is a lonely Jew who has spent his life in transit stations. He was expelled from Germany, where he worked at a museum in Berlin, then moved through Italy to Shanghai before finally arriving in Israel. He marries Yael (Liora Rivlin), an Israeli woman much younger than him, and they have a son, Michael (Yair Elazar). However, the marriage doesn't last, and they divorce, with Michael moving to live with his mother.

Erich struggles financially, running an antique shop, and constantly plans to return to Berlin, where the museum that had previously fired him offered him a job. He is unable to adapt to life and culture in Israel and plans to take Michael and his ex-wife with him. His friend from Berlin, Willy (Gideon Singer), who was also a refugee, tries to convince him to stay in Israel, but without success.

Erich speaks Hebrew, but his two sisters, Lila (Ruth Geller) and Gerti (Luna Badian), only speak German.

Erich lives in an apartment with a key-money lease. The landlady, Vera (Fanny Lobyts), moves to a nursing home in Pardes Hanna, and her son, Emmanuel (Aharon Maskin), wants to demolish the building. Erich is the last tenant left. He refuses to vacate despite pressure and threats from Emmanuel, who is willing to pay him more than the appraiser's evaluation.

Eventually, Erich leaves the apartment and rents a room in a cheap hotel managed by Flora (Jetta Luca). He meets various fringe characters, such as Diskin (Yitzhak Fitcho Ben-Tzur) and Nissim (Motti Shirin). Diskin is involved in shady loans and owes money to a criminal (Mohammad Bakri), who sends his people to beat him up.

Erich buys a plane ticket to Berlin but hesitates to fly there and likely remains in Israel—an outsider, lonely, and rootless throughout his life.

== Cast ==
Actor Name	Character
Itzhak Ben-Zur	
Gedalia Besser	
Yair Elazar	
Ruth Geller	
Fanny Lubitsch	
Gita Luka	
Amnon Moskin	
Liora Rivlin	
Talia Shapira	
Moti Shirin	
Gideon Singer	
