= Som Ock Southiponh =

Som Ock Southiphonh (Lao: ສົມອົກ ສຸດທິຜົນ, Thai: สมอก สุดทิพน) is a Laotian film director, screenwriter and film producer. Trained in Czechoslovakia, his films include Red Lotus, which was made in 1988 and is the last feature film made in Laos until more recent productions like Sabaidee Luang Prabang or Chanthaly. Since then, Som Ock has run a bakery in Vientiane to supplement his income while he tries to independently produce films.

== Biography ==
Som Ock Southiphonh was among six Laotians selected in 1977 by the communist government of Laos to study filmmaking in Prague. Originally wanting to study law, filmmaking was not Southiphonh's first choice, but he agreed because he would get to travel abroad. He was enrolled in the Faculty of Film and Television, Academy of Arts and Music, at Charles University in Prague, where he studied cinematography under Jan Machane of Barrandov Studios. Southiphonh spent nine years studying in Prague, and was the only one of the six Laotian students to complete his training.

During his time in Prague, he returned to Laos to film a 16-mm documentary, Country of a Million Elephants, which became has graduation film and was broadcast on Czech television. He returned to Laos for good in 1987 and began working for Lao National Television as a director and cameraman.

The work involved producing what he called "tourist political" pieces about Luang Prabang. "It was not what I could call rewarding," Southiphonh said in an interview. "After studying at a university, I wanted to use my skills to make something of better quality."

He soon changed jobs to work for the Lao State Cinematography Company, which employed several other Lao filmmakers who had studied in Russia, Bulgaria, Hungary, India, and Czechoslovakia. In 1987, Southipohn made two 35-mm films: a color documentary about the Communist Party Conference in Vientiane and a black-and-white docu-drama, Red Lotus or Bua Deng (Bua Daeng, Buadaeng, Bouadeng). Red Lotus is one of only two feature films made in Laos since 1975 (see also History of Laos since 1945). The other feature is the 35-mm color film, Gun Voice from the Plain of Jars, directed by Somchith Pholsena in 1983. The story of soldiers of the Second Battalion of the Lao People's Army, the film was never released due to the concerns of censors.

The story of star-cross lovers in 1972, war-time Laos (the lead actress Somchith Vongsam Ang later married Southiphonh), Red Lotus was produced with a budget of US$5,000.

"Red Lotus was very difficult to make because we had nothing, really nothing. The big problem in making such a film in Laos is that we didn't have money," Southiphonh said. "We had to use a World War II-era Soviet camera that had a tendency to speed up at will and a cast that worked for nothing. I must confess that the budget and the 22-day schedule did not allow for much opportunity to shoot everything the way I wanted to."

Despite the difficulties, the film was screened in Laos, as well as the Soviet Union, Japan, Thailand and Cambodia, where it won a special jury prize at the First Southeast Asia Film Festival in Phnom Penh in April 1997.

However, Southiphonh longed to make films independently, and he left the State Cinematography Company in 1989 with hopes of establishing his own video production company. "Money, however, was still a problem, so I did something which may be unique to the history of cinema: I started a bakery. My love of cinema was true, but I needed to earn money if I ever wanted to make films independently," Southipone said. "Fortunately, the bakery, which I run with my wife, was successful, so after about five years of hard work, I had raised enough money to buy my first professional video camera."

Southiphonh formed Lao-Inter Arts, Inc., the first private production company in Vientiane. For the company's first production, Southiphonh chose to make a documentary film on the Lenetene people in remote Bokeo Province, and submitted his outline for a script-development competition held by Francophonie. He won US$16,000 and used it to complete the 26-minute video documentary, Lenetene's Spinning Tops, in 1993.

The video was shown at the 1994 Jeux de la Francophonie, and was awarded a Medal of Merit. The film was also shown at the Yamagata International Documentary Film Festival in 1995.

Southiphonh has also completed another short documentary, The Lao Lamvong, about a Laotian traditional dance.

Meanwhile, he has tried to complete another feature film, and has written a 120-page script for a drama film about friendship, tentatively titled Given Time (Kala Vela).

But the Laotian market for films is too small and there is no funding for film projects available.

"The only thing we can hope for is that through co-production, meaning 100% foreign financing and 100% Laotian talent, Laotian cinema can keep, at least momentarily, its artisans active until better days arrive," Southiponh said.

It is our hope that through our efforts, we can help build a domestic Laotian cinema culture, one that is independent and that captures the essence of Laos as a country, its people, and its deep-rooted culture and arts. Then I dream that when people praise recent Asian cinema, they will include Laos as well.
