= Hamsin (film) =

1982 film

- Film poster
- Directed by: Daniel Wachsmann
- Written by: Daniel Wachsmann
- Starring: Shlomo Tarshish
- Release date: 1982
- Running time: 85 minutes
- Country: Israel
- Language: Hebrew

Hamsin (Hebrew: חמסין) is a 1982 Israeli drama film written and directed by Daniel Wachsmann. The film was selected as the Israeli entry for the Best Foreign Language Film at the 55th Academy Awards, but was not accepted as a nominee.

== Cast ==
- Shlomo Tarshish
- Yasein Shawaf
- Ruth Geller as Malka
- Hemda Levi as Hava

== See also ==
- List of submissions to the 55th Academy Awards for Best Foreign Language Film
- List of Israeli submissions for the Academy Award for Best Foreign Language Film
