= Iris López =

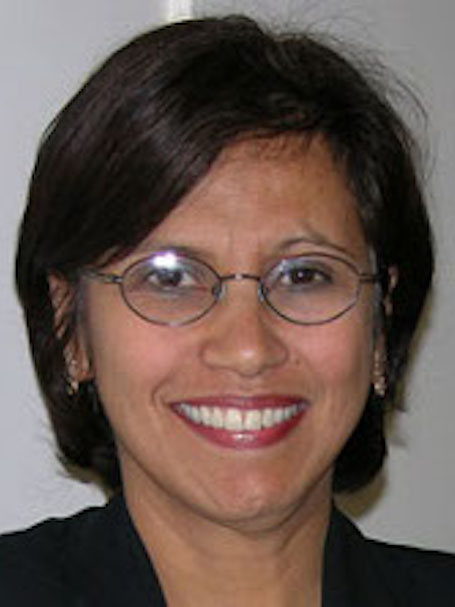

Iris López is a contemporary professor, anthropologist, sociologist, and author, whose work focuses on feminist, Latino, and Latin American studies. She has one full-length book published, an ethnography about sterilization within female Puerto Rican populations, titled Matters of Choice. She received both her Masters and Doctoral degrees in anthropology from Columbia University. Currently, López teaches sociology at the City College of New York, part of the City University of New York (CUNY), where she has been the Director of the Latin American and Latino Studies Program since 2016.

== Career ==
López attended the Borough of Manhattan Community College for her Associate of Art (A.A.). She then went to New York University (NYU) and received a Bachelors of Arts (B.A.) in Spanish Literature upon graduating in 1975. She continued on to pursue graduate degrees: In 1980, López received a Masters of Arts (M.A.) in Anthropology, and in 1985 she attained a Doctor of Philosophy (Ph.D.), also in Anthropology. Both of her graduate degrees were from Columbia University. She completed her Post Doctorate study at the University of Hawai'i at Manoa, Department of Anthropology, in 1995.

López has been Chair of the Sociology Department (2013–2016) at the Colin Powell School for Civic and Global Leadership at City College. There, she also serves as Director of the program in Latin American and Latino Studies, and is affiliated with the Women's Studies Program. She is also a Council Member on The City College Council for Inclusive Excellence. López is an involved member of the American Anthropological Association (AAA).

== Research ==
López's main focuses surround the field of feminist anthropology and its intersection with Latin American identity and ethnicity. She has studied Latino issues revolving around gender and education (specifically Puerto Rican women in the United States), as well as subject matter with themes such as reproductive and pre-natal rights, and sterilization abuse.

López is a member of The Latina Feminist Group. This group co-authored Telling to Live: Latina Feminist Testimonios. The Center for Puerto Rican Studies at Hunter College (CENTRO), hosted some of these women, including López, as guest speakers to discuss their publication via an offshoot of their program called "centroTALKS". These are "dialogues on issues concerning Puerto Ricans and Latinos".

== Publications ==
López published one ethnography, Matters of Choice: Puerto Rican Women's Struggle for Reproductive Freedom, in 2008. This book spans 25 years and 3 generations of Puerto Rican families living in New York City, many of whom are poor and do not have high degrees of education. The study focuses on women who have undergone sterilization (either tubal ligation, hysterectomy, or both) and narrates each family's story, from the first to the third generation. Themes in the ethnography include sterilization abuse, family ties, and gender roles and expectations. Aside from the family narratives, this ethnography provides historical context of the influence the United States had on Puerto Rican legislature, as well as historical context regarding eugenics and the Malthusian approach towards birth control and population control.

López co-authored a full-length book entitled Telling to Live: Latina Feminist Testimonies in 2001 with fellow members of The Latina Feminist Group.

Several of her scholarly articles are also published within academic journals, including:

"An Ethnography of the Medicalization of Puerto Rican Women's Reproduction." Featured in Pragmatism in Action: Women's Responses to Body Technologies, 1998.

"Agency and Constraint: Sterilization and Reproductive Freedom Among Puerto Rican Women in New York City." Featured in Urban Anthropology and Studies of Cultural Systems and World Economic Development, 1993.

"Borinkis and Chop Suey: Puerto Rican Identity in Hawai'i, 1900 to 2000." Featured in The Puerto Rican Diaspora: Historical Perspectives, 2005.
