= Juliana (film) =

- Directed by: Fernando Espinoza Alejandro Legaspi
- Screenplay by: René Weber
- Produced by: Grupo Chaski
- Starring: Rosa Isabel Morfino Julio Vega Maritza Gutti Guillermo Esqueche Edward Centeno
- Cinematography: Danny Gavidia
- Edited by: Fernando Espinoza Alejandro Legaspi Roberto Aponte
- Music by: José Bárcenas
- Release date: March 23, 1989
- Running time: 85 minutes
- Country: Peru

Juliana is a 1989 Peruvian drama film by the directors Fernando Espìnoza and Alejandro Legaspi, creators of the Chaski Group, and starring Rosa Isabel Morfino.

It was the second feature film by the Chaski Group, after the film Gregorio of 1984. The film was a Peruvian box office success on its premiere (March 23, 1989), seen in theaters by 600,000 viewers. Juliana was financed by the German television channel ZDF.

== Synopsis ==
Juliana is a thirteen-year-old girl who runs away from home to get away from her stepfather's abuse. On the streets, she must face the struggle to survive. She soon discovers the marginalization girls face when trying to get street work and decides to cut her hair and disguise herself as a boy. She joins a group of boys who sing in Lima's microbuses, protected and exploited at the same time by a crook. Juliana's rebellious nature and her feminine strength lead her to head a child revolution.

== Cast ==
- Rosa Isabel Morfino as Juliana
- Julio Vega as Don Pedro
- Maritza Gutti as Juliana's mother
- Guillermo Esqueche as Juliana's stepfather
- Edward Centeno as "Clavito"
- David Zuñiga as "Cobra"
- Edward Alarcon as "Moni"
- Elio Osejo as "Loco"
- Josue Cruz as "Gusano"
- Jose Ballumbrosio as "Arañita"
- Miguel Ballumbrosio as "Pele"
- Kelly Kaseng as "Nabo"
- Martin Ijuma as "Jirafa"

== Awards ==
Year	Award	Country	Category	Result	Ref
1988	Havana Film Festival	Cuba	"Saúl Yelín" Prize from Latin American Filmmakers Committee	Won	
1989	39th Berlin International Film Festival	Germany	UNICEF Award	Won	
1989	Festival de Cine Iberoamericano de Huelva	Spain	Colón de oro	Won	
1989	Biarritz Film Festival	France	Makhila d'Or	Won	
1989	Torino Film Festival	Italy	Achille Valdata Audience Award	Won	
1989	Torino Film Festival	Italy	Prize of the City of Torino	Nominated	
1989	Cartagena Film Festival	Colombia	Best film	Won	
1989	Cartagena Film Festival	Colombia	OCIC Award	Won	
1989	Cartagena Film Festival	Colombia	Cineclubs Award	Won	
1989	Festroia International Film Festival	Portugal	Mejor realización	Won	
1989	Festroia International Film Festival	Portugal	FIPRESCI Award	Won	
1989	Festroia International Film Festival	Portugal	Special Jury Prize	Won	

== Sequel ==
"Anda, corre, vuela" (1995) sees Juliana, as a young adult falling in love with Gregorio in the tumultuous social landscape of Lima during the Shining Path insurgency era.
