= Miguel Frank =

Chilean writer, dramatist and lawyer

Miguel Frank (March 27, 1920 - August 9, 1994) was a Chilean writer, dramatist and lawyer.

== Theater career ==
Later he devoted himself to the theater in which he created and directed highly successful works like "Waltz Time" (1950), "The Terrible Carolina" (1954) and "The Man of the Century" (1946) which was translated into English and published by Southern Illinois University Press in 1970.
