= La Operación =

1982 film by Ana María García

- Directed by: Ana María García
- Produced by: Latin American Film Project
- Release date: 1982

La Operación is a forty-minute documentary film by Ana María García about US-imposed sterilization policies in Puerto Rico. Produced by the Latin American Film Project and released in 1982, this film explores the mass sterilization of Puerto Rican women during the 1950s and 1960s. In the documentary, Garcia sheds light on the decades-long practice by conducting interviews with women of different ethnic and economic backgrounds who have undergone the sterilization procedure. In addition to these interviews, Garcia provides historical information regarding the conditions that led to the sterilization practice.

== Historical background ==
Beginning with the Spanish American War of 1898, the film details the origin and subsequent expansion of US involvement in Puerto Rico. Citing that the island was overpopulated, the United States implemented many strategies to try and remedy the perceived problem, all of which are showcased in the documentary. From promoting migration to large cities in the mainland to family planning, numerous methods were tested. One of the most controversial methods was the idea of forced sterilization. As depicted in the film, this process would provide two perceived benefits to Puerto Rican society. First and foremost, the procedure would drastically reduce the number of children being born on the island, thus reducing the overall population problem. Also, this would allow more women to be members of the labor force, which would be required by the American companies that were taking a foothold in Puerto Rico. The film discusses this whole concept by showcasing Operation Bootstrap, the idea of transforming the economy on the island to a more developed one.

== Interviews ==
The interviews conducted in this film are with women who have undergone the sterilization procedure. They recount their personal experiences as well as those of their family members. In some cases, even some of the women's female children have been subjected to the procedure. They reflect on how the procedure has affected their lives and express their overall feelings towards it. Some of the women regret the procedure while others are confused as to what exactly happened to them. The film also features physicians and other experts on this topic who give their respective opinions on this subject.
