= Laura Briggs =

Feminist scholar and historian

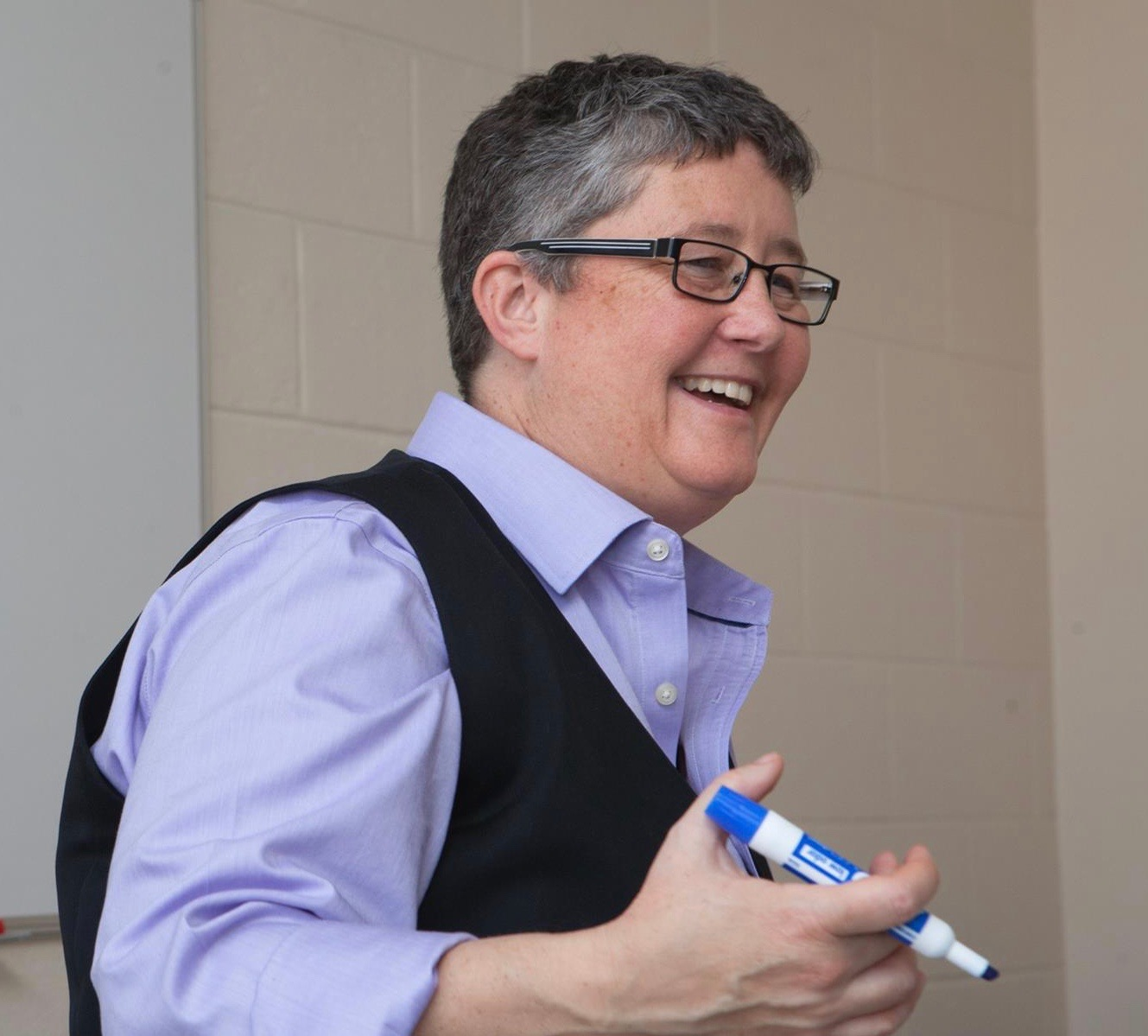
- Education: Mount Holyoke College; Harvard University; Brown University
- Occupations: Historian, Professor
- Employer: University of Massachusetts Amherst
- Awards: James A. Rawley Prize (OAH)

Laura Briggs is a feminist critic and historian of reproductive politics and US empire. She works on transnational and transracial adoption and the relationship between race, sex, gender, and US imperialism. Her 2012 book Somebody's Children: The Politics of Transracial and Transnational Adoption won the James A. Rawley Prize from the Organization of American Historians for best book on the history of US race relations and has been featured on numerous college syllabi in the US and Canada. Briggs serves as professor and chair of the Women, Gender, and Sexuality Studies program at the University of Massachusetts Amherst.

== Education ==
Laura Briggs received her bachelor's degree in women's studies from Mount Holyoke College. She obtained a master's degree in theology and secondary education from Harvard University and completed her doctorate in American Civilization at Brown University. Briggs received the Woodrow Wilson/Johnson & Johnson Dissertation Grant in Women’s Health for her dissertation project.

== Career ==
After completing her Ph.D., Briggs taught in the departments of Women's Studies and Anthropology at the University of Arizona from 1997 to 2011 before serving as the head of UA's department of Gender and Women's Studies from 2006 to 2007 and again from 2008 to 2010. She became the Associate Dean of Social and Behavioral Sciences at the University of Arizona in March 2010 and held this position until July 2011. In August 2011, Briggs left the University of Arizona to become professor and chair of the department of Women, Gender, and Sexuality Studies at the University of Massachusetts Amherst.

Briggs has held fellowships at the Warren Center for Studies in American History at Harvard University, the Tanner Humanities Center at the University of Utah, and the University of Michigan Eisenberg Institute for Historical Studies.

Throughout her career, Briggs has been actively involved in the feminist and LGBTQ movements, Latin American solidarity politics, union organizing, and AIDS activism. She was an organizer of the Second National March on Washington for Lesbian and Gay Rights in 1987, and, from 1989 to 1991, she was a reporter for Gay Community News, reporting on subjects ranging from reproductive rights in South Africa and Central America to Boston LGBT politics. She was a founder and organizer of the Tepotzlan Conference and volunteered as a border Samaritan during her time at the University of Arizona. In 2016 and 2017, Briggs served on the Executive Council of the American Studies Association. Her writing about the Adoptive Couple v. Baby Girl 2013 Supreme Court case has been featured on local and national sites.

== Publications ==
Briggs' articles on torture, the crisis in higher education, and the biopolitics of adoption have been published in esteemed journals such as American Quarterly, the International Feminist Journal of Politics, Feminist Studies, Radical History Review, American Indian Quarterly, and Scripta Nova (Barcelona). Briggs serves as a book review editor for American Quarterly and is on the editorial committee of the University of California Press' American Crossroads Series and the Advisory Board of the University of California Press' Reproductive Justice Series.

She has authored three books and co-edited one collection of essays, and has contributed chapters presenting original research in numerous edited volumes, including, most recently, Lori Reed and Paula Saukko's Governing the Female Body (SUNY Press 2010), Eileen Boris and Rhacel Salazar Parreñas' Intimate Labors: Cultures, Technologies, and the Politics of Care (Stanford University Press 2010), and Ann Laura Stoler's Haunted by Empire: Geographies of Intimacy in North American Empire (Duke University Press 2006). She reviewed the state of the field of gender studies in Vicki Ruiz, Eileen Boris, and Jay Kleinberg’s The Practice of U.S. Women's History: Narratives, Intersections, and Dialogues (Rutgers 2007) and contributed the accompanying article on the keyword “Science” in the second edition of Keywords for American Cultural Studies (NYU Press 2007).

In 2009, Briggs and Diana Marre published International Adoption: Global Inequalities and the Circulation of Children (NYU Press), a collection of critical essays that defines reproduction in its relation to law and family and highlights perspectives from both sending and receiving countries. This collection is "one of the first anthologies on international adoption to bring together scholars from different parts of the world." It includes critical examination of adoption in Hawaii, Canada, Sweden, Brazil, Russia, Peru, and Lithuania.

=== Reproducing Empire: Race, Sex, Science and U.S. Imperialism in Puerto Rico (2002) ===
Briggs' first book Reproducing Empire: Race, Sex, Science and U.S. Imperialism in Puerto Rico (University of California Press 2002) looks at the origins of modern globalization through an analysis of the relationship between the US and Puerto Rico. Specifically, the book addresses two key questions: How has Puerto Rican difference been produced, and how has the US role on the island been denied? In doing so, it examines "everyday life practices, ideological constructs, and government programs associated with family reproduction, marital strategies, sexuality, and the use (and abuse) of women's bodies." The book has been called "a landmark work for Puerto Rican studies" and a "significant work that makes an important contribution to American and Latin American Studies, politics, history, and gender studies" by creating a "new framework" for thinking about the relationship of race, gender, reproduction, and science to larger processes of colonialism and globalization.

=== Somebody's Children: The Politics of Transnational and Transracial Adoption (2012) ===
Briggs' second book Somebody's Children: The Politics of Transnational and Transracial Adoption (Duke University Press 2012) won the 2013 James A. Rawley Prize from the Organization of American Historians for best book on the history of US race relations and has been described as making a "timely intervention into the politics of adoption today" by presenting an analysis of reproductive politics through the lens of US foreign policy. This interdisciplinary project is divided into three sections: the first examines adoption in the US, with a focus on African American, Native, and poor mothers and families; the second looks at transnational adoption in Latin America against a background of US intervention; and the third looks at contemporary reproductive politics, with a focus on immigrant mothers and gay and lesbian adoptive parents. As such, it situates the phenomenon of adoption within complex power dynamics and legacies of violence. Historian Rickie Solinger notes that Briggs is charting new directions for the field of reproductive politics and has cited this book as "among books that have changed the way I understand the histories of reproductive politics." Sara Dorow writes that "by viewing political history through the lens of adoption, Somebody’s Children turns conventional methodologies of adoption inside out" and "makes a significant contribution to a growing body of scholarship that recognizes that the story of struggles over kinship is also the story of institutional and international configurations of power and of raced, classed, and gendered productions of subjectivity." Somebody's Children has been included on numerous syllabi for courses in reproductive politics and women and globalization. The book originally grew out of Briggs' own experience adopting a child through the US foster care system. In addition to the book, Briggs also has a blog titled Somebody`s Children.

=== How All Politics Became Reproductive Politics: From Welfare Reform to Foreclosure to Trump (2017) ===
Briggs' third book How All Politics Became Reproductive Politics: From Welfare Reform to Foreclosure to Trump (University of California Press 2017) presents "a critical and timely analysis for all reproductive justice activists and scholars." The book centers around the relationship of reproductive politics to policy and public discourse within the last few decades, arguing that "what happens in our public policy is living also in our households." Briggs writes, “The massive changes in the economy since the late 1970s—stagnant real wages, shrinking government support for everything from schools to roads to welfare, ‘personal responsibility’ and ‘moral hazard’ as the reasons for vast public policy changes—were driven in significant part through a demonization of the reproductive labor of people understood to be women, particularly women of color, and all people who do care work." By drawing connections between, among other things, the rise of neoliberalism and shifting discourses surrounding race and immigration, the regulatory function of reproductive technologies, and the cultural phenomena of welfare reform, gay marriage, and the subprime mortgage crisis, Briggs analyzes the factors that led to the Trump presidency and the current socio-economic state of the US. Rickie Solinger describes Briggs as "one of our most important thinkers and writers on the subject of reproductive politics" and writes that, "In this book, as in her previous work, Briggs offers us startlingly new ways of thinking about fundamental matters, while relying on a logic that makes her arguments feel utterly clear and correct." The book has been reviewed on the Times Higher Education blog and featured on The Electorette podcast and "Against the Grain" radio program.

== Awards ==
Briggs was awarded the 2002 Constance Rourke Prize for her article "The Race of Hysteria: ‘Overcivilization’ and the ‘Savage’ Woman in Late Nineteenth-Century Obstetrics and Gynecology,” published in the June 2000 issue of American Quarterly. In 2007, she was the recipient of the Comparative Ethnic Studies Prize from the American Studies Association, and, in 2009, Briggs received the University of Arizona Magellan Circle Award for Excellence in Graduate Teaching and the University of Arizona Magellan Circle Faculty Award for Research. The following year she received an ABOR Learner-Centered Education Grant to develop a library of online course materials for gender and women's studies.
