= Fadika Kramo-Lanciné =

Ivorian film director

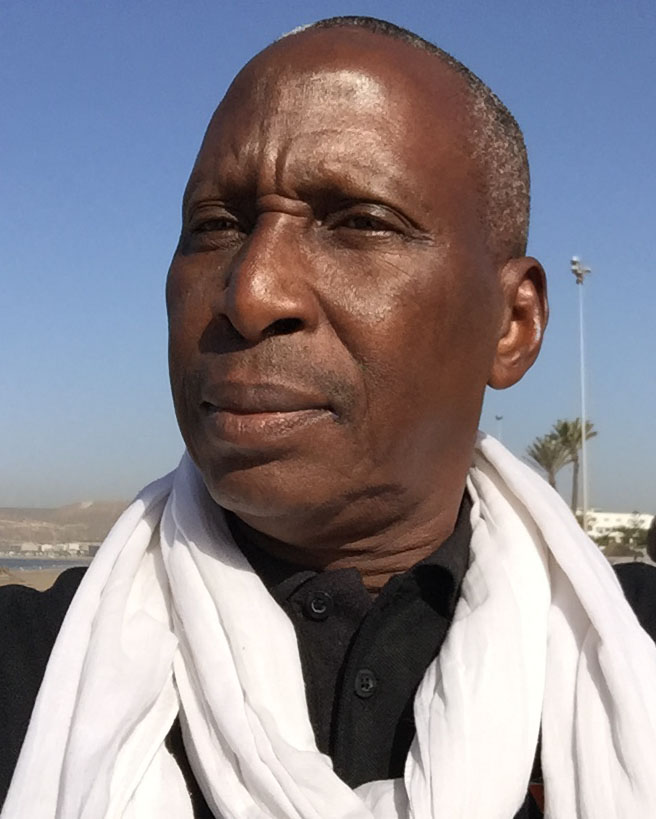
- Born: 1948; Danané, French West Africa
- Died: June 5, 2022
- Education: University of Abidjan
- Occupations: film director, screenwriter, and producer

Fadika Kramo-Lanciné (1948 – June 5, 2022) was an Ivorian film director as well as a screenwriter and producer of both fiction and documentary films.

== Biography ==
Kramo-Lanciné was born in Danané in the far west of the French West Africa in 1948. He studied modern literature at the University of Abidjan in his home country, and then studied film at the Louis Lumière School in Paris, France. Kramo-Lanciné joined the National Office of Rural Promotion in 1975 and took charge of educational films and television programs on development issues.

== Career ==
His first work, La Fin de la Course, was a 14-minute short story film directed in 1974. After joining the office of rural promotion, Kramo-Lanciné directed a dozen educational films and television shows between 1975 and 1981. In 1978, he began making his first feature film, Djéli, conte d'aujourd'hui or Djeli: a tale of today, with the help of a team of television technicians. Completed in 1981, Djéli received the Grand Prix (Yennenga Stallion) at the 7th Panafrican Film and Television Festival of Ouagadougou, also known as the FESPACO awards. In 1993 he served as director, screenwriter, and producer of Wariko, Le gros lot or Wariko, the Jackpot. The film tells the story of a poor traffic cop who wins the lottery, only to realize that his winning ticket has disappeared.

From 2013 to 2016 Kramo-Lanciné was the director of National Cinematography of Côte d'Ivoire, and since 2016 has been the technical advisor for cinema at the Ministry of Francophone Culture.

In 2017 a statue of Kramo-Lanciné was erected at the avenue of film makers in Ouagadougou to commemorate his cinematic achievements.

== Filmography ==
- 1974 : La Fin de la Cour
- 1980 : Djéli conte d'aujourd'hui
- 1993 : Wariko (Le gros lot)
