= Ana María García =

American film director

Ana María García is a Cuban-Puerto Rican film director. She is best known for the short documentary La Operación (1982) a film which focuses on US-imposed sterilization policies in Puerto Rico.

She produced the documentary Cocolos y Rockeros(1992) which documents the musical opinions of the youth in Puerto Rico. "Cocolos" refers to people who prefer salsa music to "rockeros," those who prefer rock music. The film blends humor and music to explore the ways in which young people understand issues of national identity. The music of Gilberto Santa Rosa, El Gran Combo, and REO Speedwagon are featured in the film.
