= Milan Apih =

Yugoslav activist and writer (1906–1992)

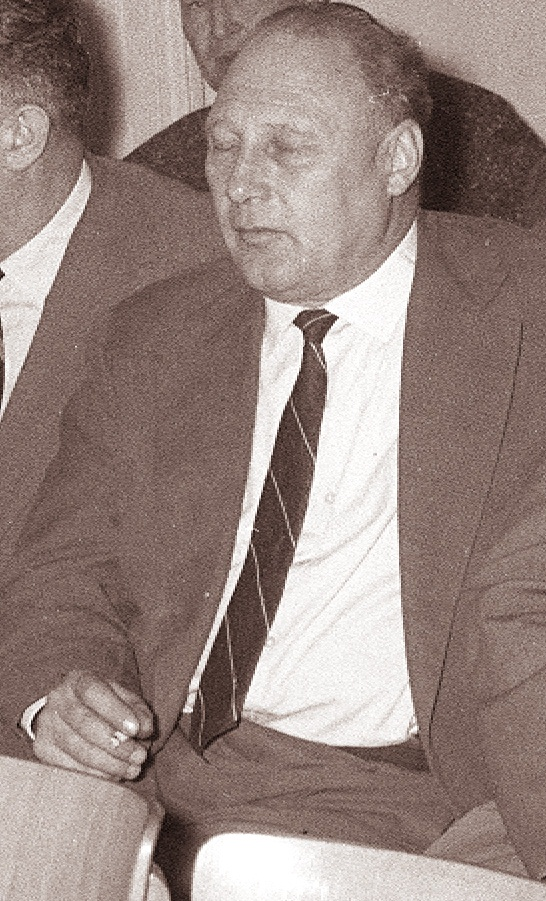
Milan Apih in 1962

Milan Apih (1906–1992) was a Yugoslav teacher, political activist and writer of Slovene origin.

Apih was born in Celje, in the Duchy of Styria of the Austro-Hungarian empire (present-day Slovenia). In 1925 he graduated at Teachers' College. For some time he worked as a school teacher. In 1932, he joined the illegal Communist Party of Yugoslavia. Due to active membership he was arrested and 1934 imprisoned in Sremska Mitrovica for four years. Returned to Celje, where he was in 1940 arrested again, this time nine months imprisoned in Bileća. There he wrote well-known song Bilećanka and composed a music.

In 1941, he joined the Yugoslav partisans in Slovenia and soon rose to prominent military position. During the Axis occupation of Yugoslavia, his family suffered several tragedies. Two of his children died due to malnutrition. His first son Jure Apih, survived the war as a refugee hiding from the authorities in Zagreb.

After World War II, Apih became an important Communist official. He was one of the associates of the Yugoslav minister of interior affairs Aleksandar Ranković, being in charge of finances and supplies. In 1954 moved from Belgrade to Slovenia, appointed to several duties: director of Radio Ljubljana, later the President (mayor) of the Maribor County, then Member of the Parliament, in 1963 became a Member of the Constitutional Court of the SR Slovenia. In the 1960s, however, he became critical towards the regime. In the 1980s, he became associated with the alternative dissident journal Nova revija. During the JBTZ-trial in 1988, he was among the supporters (together with Alenka Puhar and Drago Jančar) of the first mass demonstration in the communist regime, demanding the changes.

During the years 1962-90 he published memoirs, the book of poems, translated some foreign authors and co-edited the book of revolutionary songs from all over the world, titled "Stand up the Slaves". In the 1980s he defended the idea of reconciliation (among fighters united within The Liberation Front and Axis collaborators) brought up by Spomenka Hribar in her essay Krivda in greh (the Guilt and the Sin) dedicated to Edvard Kocbek.

Apih died in Ljubljana in 1992. His peculiar life destiny, from a Communist activist to resistance fighter, Communist official, to a dissident and finally an anti-Communist activist, was the source of Drago Jančar's novel, Graditelj ("The Builder").
