= 1992 Slovenian presidential election =

- 6 December 1992
- Turnout: 85.78%
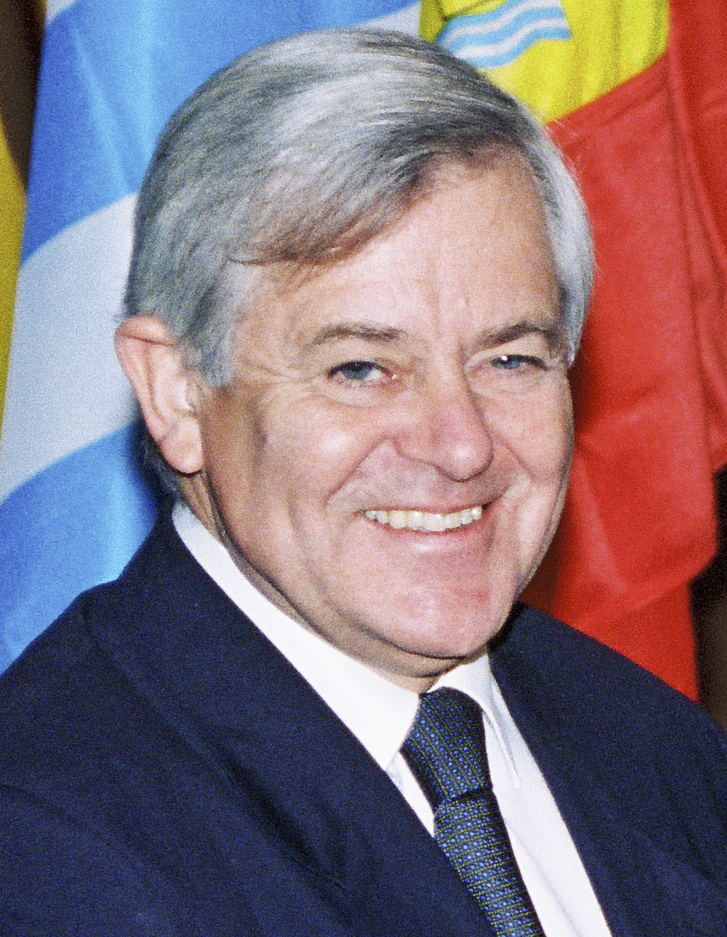

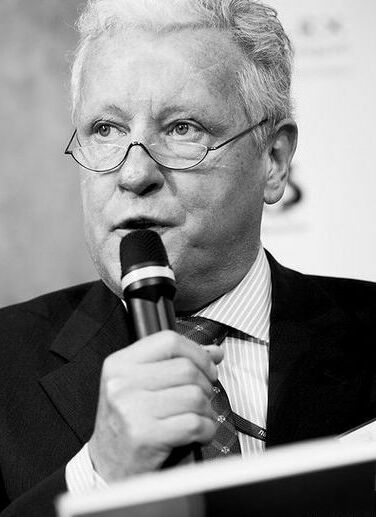

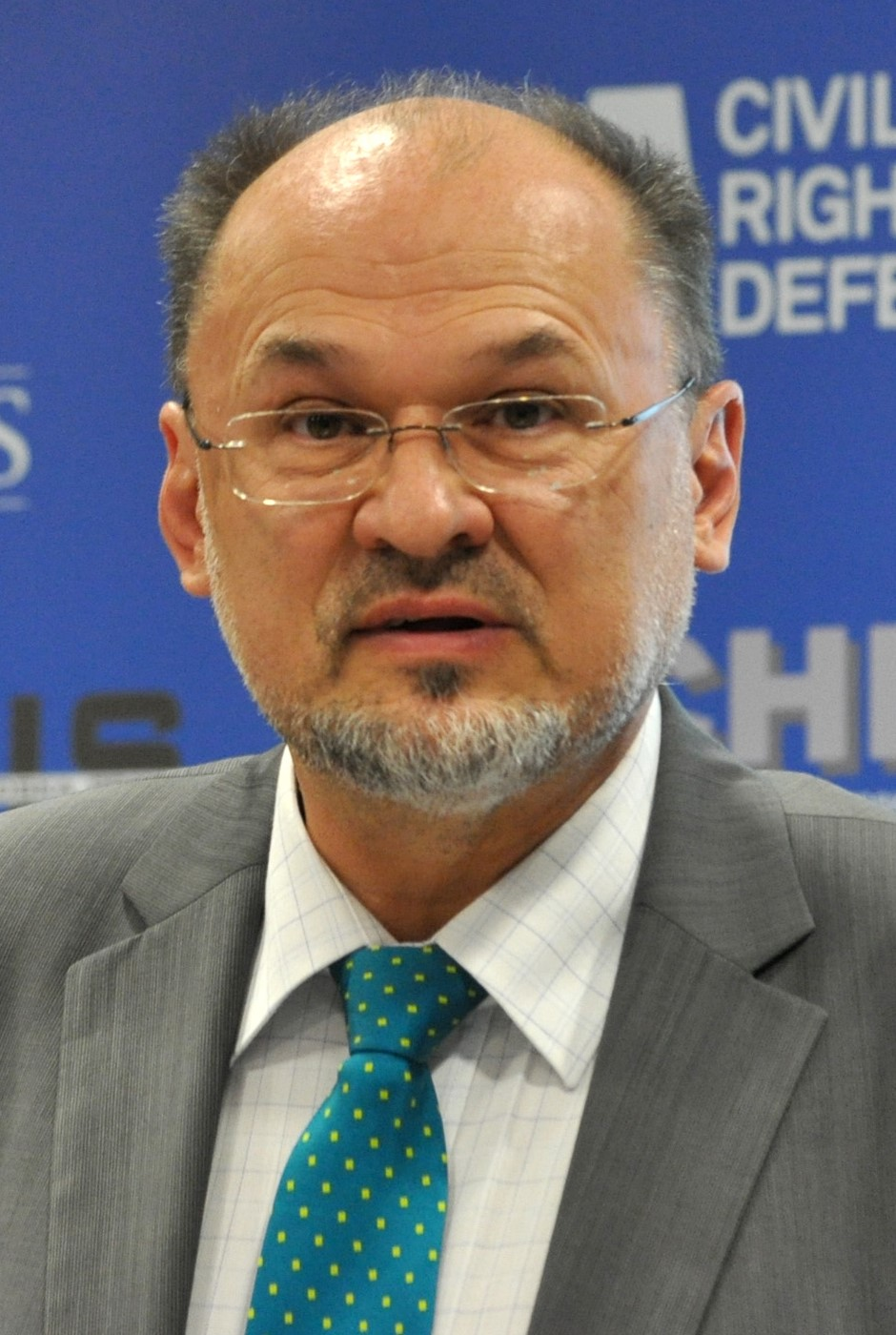
Nominee	Milan Kučan	Ivan Bizjak	Jelko Kacin
Party	Independent	SKD	DSS
Popular vote	795,012	262,847	90,711
Percentage	63.93%	21.14%	7.29%
President before election
Milan Kučan
Independent
Elected President
Milan Kučan
Independent

Presidential elections were held in Slovenia on 6 December 1992. The result was a victory for incumbent Milan Kučan, who won 63.93% of the vote. Voter turnout was 85.78%.

== Results ==
Candidate	Party	Votes	%
Milan Kučan	Independent	795,012	63.93
Ivan Bizjak	Slovene Christian Democrats	262,847	21.14
Jelko Kacin	Democratic Party	90,711	7.29
Stanislav Buser	Slovenian People's Party	24,051	1.93
Darja Lavtižar-Bebler	Socialist Party of Slovenia	22,691	1.82
Alenka Žagar-Slana	National Democratic Party	21,603	1.74
Ljubo Sirc	Liberal Democratic Party	18,774	1.51
France Tomšič	Social Democratic Party of Slovenia	7,849	0.63
Total		1,243,538	100.00
Valid votes		1,243,538	97.20
Invalid/blank votes		35,817	2.80
Total votes		1,279,355	100.00
Registered voters/turnout		1,491,374	85.78
Source: European Elections Database
