= Spomenka Hribar =

Slovenian academic and politician

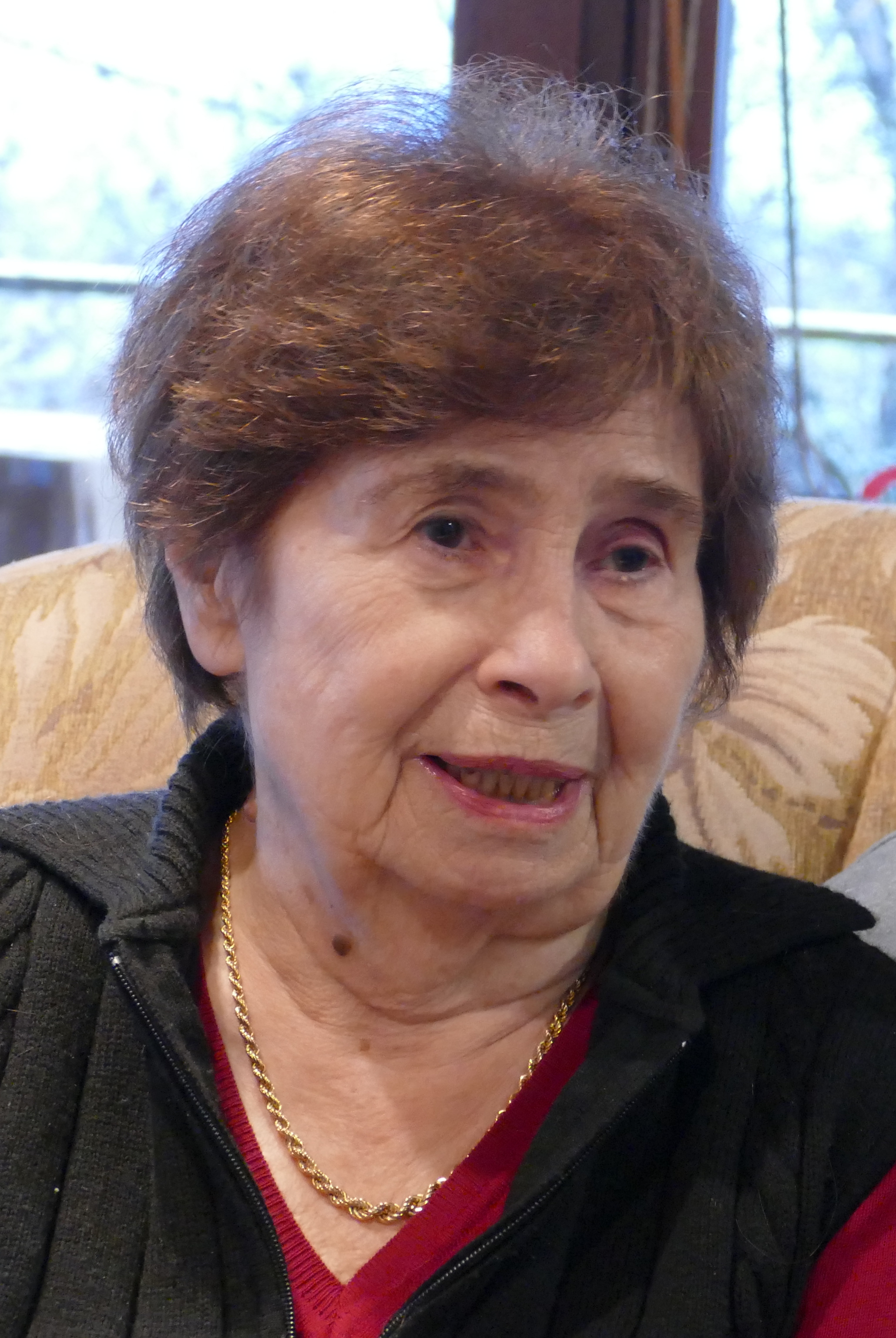
Image of Spomenka Hribar

Spomenka Hribar (born 25 January 1941) is a Slovenian author, philosopher, sociologist, politician, columnist, and public intellectual. She was one of the most influential Slovenian intellectuals in the 1980s, and was frequently called "the First Lady of Slovenian Democratic Opposition", and "the Voice of Slovenian Spring" She is married to the Slovenian Heideggerian philosopher Tine Hribar.

== Early life ==
She was born Spomenka Diklić in Belgrade, then the capital of the Kingdom of Yugoslavia, to a Serb father (Radenko Diklić) and a Slovene mother (Marija Jelica Mravlje). Her father died at the Glavnjača prison, where the opponents of the collaborationist state of Milan Nedić were imprisoned. After World War II, she moved with her mother to Slovenia, then part of Yugoslavia. She spent her childhood in the village of Žiri. After finishing high school in Škofja Loka, she enrolled at the University of Ljubljana, where she studied philosophy and sociology. She graduated in 1965 with a thesis on Marx's concept of freedom. Between 1965 and 1966, she was co-editor of the student magazine Tribuna. Under her solicitation, the magazine became one of the first Yugoslav student journals which also published pieces by students of theology. Among the young theologians sponsored by Hribar was also Anton Stres, later archbishop of Ljubljana who shared the same scholarly interest as Hribar in the Marxist and Hegelian conceptions of freedom.

In 1969, she got a job at the Institute for Sociology of the University of Ljubljana. Although, a member of the Communist Party, she grew alienated from Marxism in the 1970s. Under the influence of the literary historian Dušan Pirjevec and the philosopher Tine Hribar, whom she later married, she developed an interest in the phenomenological philosophy of Martin Heidegger. In 1975, after the poet and thinker Edvard Kocbek publicly denounced the mass killings of Slovene Home Guard members by the Communist regime after World War II, she dedicated most of her intellectual endeavours to the understanding and explaining what she called the tragedy of Slovenian resistance and revolution during and after World War II.

== The public intellectual ==
In the 1980s, Spomenka and her husband Tine Hribar became important members of a newly formed circle of critical Slovene intellectuals, gathered around the journal Nova revija. In 1983, she started writing the essay "Guilt and Sin" (Krivda in greh), which became one of the most influential texts in post-war Slovenia. In the essay, meant for publishing in a collective volume on Edvard Kocbek, she denounced the mass killings in Slovenia after World War II.

In early 1984, the essay leaked to the officials of the League of Communists of Slovenia. In September of the same year, shortly before the planned issue of the volume, the official Slovenian press launched a campaign against Spomenka Hribar, accusing her of counter-revolutionary attitudes and slander against the partisan resistance. In 1985, she was expelled from the Communist Party. Despite the denigration campaign, many important public figures rose to her defence, including the sociologist Pavle Gantar. In this period, she was first called "the Slovene Antigone", an epitome that has stuck to her since then. In 1987, she was a co-author of the Contributions for the Slovenian National Program, a collective text in which several Slovene public intellectuals and scholars demanded a sovereign and democratic Slovenian state.

== Political activism ==
In 1989, she was one of the co-founders of the Slovenian Democratic Union, one of the first anti-Communist parties in Slovenia. Together with her husband Tine Hribar and the jurists France Bučar and Peter Jambrek She became one of the party's foremost theoreticians. In the first free elections in Slovenia in April 1990, won by the Democratic Opposition of Slovenia, she was elected to the Slovenian Parliament. Between 1990 and 1991, she was very active in the endeavours for the separation of Slovenia from Yugoslavia. Together with Jože Pučnik, she emerged as the leader of the DEMOS coalition majority in the Lower Chamber of the Slovenian Parliament.

At the same time, she grew increasingly critical to the right wing of the DEMOS coalition, embodied by the Slovene Christian Democrats, whom she accused of backing the Roman Catholic Church and favouring their own sectarian vision of neo-conservative revisionism against the common endeavours for Slovenian independence from Yugoslavia. After the Ten-Day War, Hribar turned against the conservative wing of her own party, the Slovenian Democratic Union. The clash resulted in the split of the party between the social liberal Democratic Party and the liberal conservative National Democratic Party, which occurred in late 1991. In 1992, Hribar was among those who pushed for the dissolution of the DEMOS coalition, and backed the formation of a centre left government under the Liberal Democrat Janez Drnovšek.

== Public figure after 1992 ==
Before the elections of 1992, Spomenka Hribar caused a famous controversy with the article "Stopping the Right Wing" (Zaustaviti desnico, sometimes erroneously rendered as an imperative, Zaustavite desnico, that is "Stop the Right Wing!"). In the article, she warned against the rise of right wing discourse in post-independence Slovenia.

After the failure of the Democratic Party in 1992, Hribar withdrew from party politics, but remained in public life as a commentator and columnist. In her articles, she has stood up for various left liberal values in various contexts, from bioethics to immigration and integration policies. Her criticism towards the Slovenian right wing gradually brought Hribar closer to the Slovenian left wing, including then- President of Slovenia Milan Kučan and the third way reformist circles within the United List of Social Democrats. She frequently, however, took a more nationalist stand regarding foreign policy, especially the border disputes with neighbouring Croatia.

== Polemics with Janez Janša ==
In the 1990s, Spomenka Hribar emerged as one of the strongest critics of the politician Janez Janša, one of the leaders of the Slovenian right wing. The two had been close allies until 1992. In 1992, Spomenka Hribar and her husband Tine Hribar even offered Janša to take the leadership of the liberal wing of the Slovenian Democratic Union However, both later accused Janša of populism and condemned his conciliatory attitude towards the conservative sections of Slovenian Catholicism.

Spomenka Hribar turned against Janša in 1996, denouncing his "right wing turn" and accusing him of a sectarian and paranoiac conception of politics. She later intensified her criticism, accusing him of authoritarianism and demagoguery. Differently from her husband Tine Hribar, who became more conciliatory towards Janša after 2004, seeing him as an essentially positive figure in Slovenian conservativism and implicitly supporting him in the 2004 elections,

She maintained her position against the conservative politician. In 2007, she accused him of corruption and anti-democratic attitudes. Janša has accused Hribar of fostering personal animosity against his person, and stimulating a climate of culture wars in Slovenia. In Janša's view, Hribar has always had a deep disinterest in economic policies; she has failed to analyse the true power and economic relations in Slovenian society by obscuring them with both ideological mystifications and personal obsessions, thus helping the liberal economic and political establishment that has hegemonized the Slovenian public sphere since the 1990s. Spomenka's husband, Tine, who shared her political views throughout the 1990s, has maintained a substantially positive opinion of Janša since 2004.

In 2009, the youth wing of the New Slovenia party claimed Spomenka had collaborated with the Yugoslav Secret Police (UDBA) based on a number with her name in leaked files. However, the file number is among the range associated with people that were monitored by the secret police, rather than those that collaborated with them.

== Works ==
- Družbeno politične vrednote mladih (Social and Political Values of the Youngsters). Ljubljana, 1968 (co-authored with Andrej Caserman)
- Vrednote mladih in resnica časa (The Values of Youngsters and the Truth of the Time). Ljubljana, 1970.
- Meje sociologije (The Borders of Sociology). Maribor, 1972.
- Ubiti očeta (Killing the Father), a play. Ljubljana, 1983.
- Edvard Kocbek in križarsko gibanje na Slovenskem (Edvard Kocbek and the Crusaders Movement in Slovenia). Ljubljana, 1990.
- Krivda in greh (Guilt and Sin). Maribor, 1990.
- Dolomitska izjava (The Dolomites Statement). Ljubljana, 1991. ISBN 978-961-6017-07-7.
- Svitanja (Morning Lights). Ljubljana, 1994.
- Svet kot zarota (The World As a Conspiracy). Ljubljana, 1996.
- Škof Rožman v zgodovini (The Bishop Rožman in History), co-authored with Janko Pleterski and others. Ljubljana, 2008.
- Razkrižja (Crossing Points). Ljubljana, 2009.
