= Tine Hribar =

Philosopher

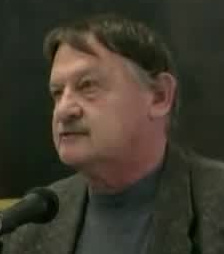
Tine Hribar

Tine Hribar (born 28 January 1941 as Velentin Hribar) is a Slovenian philosopher and public intellectual, notable for his interpretations of Heidegger and his role in the democratization of Slovenia between 1988 and 1990, known as the Slovenian Spring. He is the husband of author, essayist and political commentator Spomenka Hribar.

== Life ==
He was born in the small village of Goričica near Ihan in central Slovenia (then part of the Kingdom of Yugoslavia). He studied philosophy and sociology at the University of Ljubljana. He continued his studies at the University of Zagreb under the supervision of Croatian phenomenologist philosopher Vanja Sutlić. In 1971 he started teaching philosophy and sociology at the Faculty of Social Sciences of the University of Ljubljana. In 1975 he was fired from the university, together with fellow sociologist Veljko Rus, because of his non-Marxist attitudes. In 1981 he co-founded the alternative journal Nova revija.

In 1987 Hribar was among the editors of the famous "Contributions to the Slovenian National Program", published in a special number of the journal Nova revija, in which sixteen authors demanded a democratic and sovereign Slovenia. Between 1989 and 1991 he was an active member of the Slovenian Democratic Union, one of the central parties within the DEMOS coalition that won the first free elections in Slovenia in April 1990. Hribar and Peter Jambrek and France Bučar were the party's main strategists. After the party broke up in 1991, Hribar joined the left liberal Democratic Party, but withdrew from active engagement in politics.

In 1992 Hribar became a professor at the University of Ljubljana again. In 1995 he became a member of the Slovenian Academy of Sciences and Arts.

== Political commentator ==
Hribar's role in Slovenian public life after 1991 caused controversy. In the early 1990s he warned against the recurrence of clericalism in Slovenia, and was critical of his former coalition partners of the Slovene Christian Democrats, especially the former Prime Minister Lojze Peterle. After 1994 he became a critic of conservative opposition leader Janez Janša, his former party colleague and close collaborator between 1989 and 1991. In the 1990s Hribar supported the ruling centre-left Liberal Democracy of Slovenia. In 2004 however, he turned against the ruling left-wing coalition, accusing it of fostering a "vulgar type of liberalism". He co-founded the liberal conservative civic platform Rally for the Republic, which publicly supported the centre-right electoral coalition led by Janez Janša. This sudden and radical turn in Hribar's political affiliation was widely criticized, especially by post-Marxist philosopher Slavoj Žižek, Hribar's former collaborator from the late 1970s.

Between 2004 and 2008, Hribar was relatively supportive of the policies of Janša's government, especially the Slovenian Democratic Party, which he had fiercely criticized in the 1990s. He has nevertheless maintained his thoroughly anti-clerical and, to a certain extent, anti-Catholic position.

After the parliamentary elections of 2008, which brought the left wing to power in Slovenia, Hribar adopted critical stance towards the Slovenian left, accusing it of abusing power for personal privileges. He maintained a critical, but substantially favourable attitude towards the Slovenian secular right wing parties, especially to the Slovenian Democratic Party and its leader Janez Janša, whom he nevertheless accused of an excessively moralizing political discourse.

== Major works ==
- Človek in vera (Man and Faith), 1969.
- Molk besede (The Silence of the Word), 1970.
- Resnica o resnici (Truth about Truth), 1981.
- Metoda Marxovega Kapitala (The Method of Marx's Capital), 1983.
- Kopernikanski obrat (The Copernican Turn), 1984.
- Moč znanosti: marksistična teorija družboslovja (The Power of Science: the Marxist Theory of Social Sciences), 1985.
- Slovenska državnost (The Statehood of Slovenia), 1989.
- Uvod v etiko (Introduction to Ethics), 1991.
- Ontološka diferenca (The Ontological Difference), 1992.
- Fenomenologija 1 (Phenomenology, Vol. 1), 1993.
- Pustiti biti : kriza evropskega nihilizma (Letting Be: the Crisis of European Nihilism), 1994.
- Fenomenologija 2 (Phenomenology, Vol. 2), 1995.
- Slovenci kot nacija (Slovenians as a Nation), 1995.
- Evangelij po Nietzscheju (The Gospel According to Nietzsche), 2002.
- Dar biti (The Gift of Being), 2003.
- Evroslovenstvo (The Notion of a European Slovenia), 2004.
- Fenomenološki etos (The Phenomenological Ethos), 2009.
- Ena je groza (There is Only One Dread), 2010.

== See also ==
- Ivo Urbančič
- Dean Komel
