= Igor Bavčar =

Slovenian politician and human rights activist

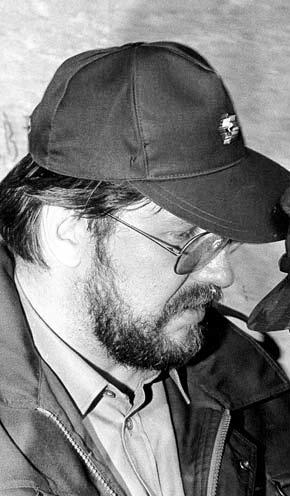

Minister of the Interior
- In office 16 May 1990 – 25 January 1993
- Preceded by: Tomaž Ertl
- Succeeded by: Ivan Bizjak

Personal details
- Born: 28 November 1955 (age 70) Postojna, Slovenia, Yugoslavia
- Party: Slovenian Democratic Union
- Education: University of Ljubljana
- Profession: Politician, Businessman

Igor Bavčar (born 28 November 1955) is a Slovenian politician and manager. He rose to prominence during the Slovenian spring, when he served as chairman of the Committee for the Defence of Human Rights, the largest independent civil society movement in the Socialist Republic of Slovenia. He was the Slovenian Minister of Interior during the Slovenian war of independence in June 1991, and coordinated Slovenian defence forces together with the Minister of Defence Janez Janša. He remained one of the most influential political figures in Slovenia until 1992, and remained an important member of the political establishment until 2002, when he left politics to engage in the private sector.

== Early career ==
Igor Bavčar was born in the town of Postojna in western Slovenia, then part of the Federal People's Republic of Yugoslavia, to a family originating from the Vipava Valley. After finishing the Novo Mesto Grammar School, he went to a police academy. After a few years, he decided to leave the police career, and enrolled in the University of Ljubljana (Faculty of Social Sciences), where he studied political science. During his student years, he became the editor of the radical student journal Tribuna that advocated orthodox Marxist and even Maoist tendencies.

In the early 1980s, he joined the Union of Socialist Youth of Slovenia, covering several crucial functions in the official political youth structure of the Communist Party. In the mid 1980s, he met with the young activist Janez Janša. In 1984, when Janša was persecuted because of his criticism of the Yugoslav People's Army in the mid 1980s, Bavčar took a decided stance in defence of his friend. The same year, Bavčar left the Socialist Youth, and dedicated himself to study. In the late 1980s, he formed a small private enterprise dealing with information technology. At the same time, he remained active in public life in the Socialist Alliance of the Working People, an auxiliary organization of the Communist party, founded to cover the civil society sphere. In 1987, Bavčar organized a conference on ecological policies in Yugoslavia that had a wide echo in the public debate. The same year, he left the Communist Party. Together with Janez Janša, he established contacts with Stane Kavčič, a former reformist Slovenian Communist politician who had been deposed during the authoritative turn in Yugoslav internal policy in 1972, and published his memoirs.

== Politician ==
In May 1988, when the Yugoslav People's Army arrested four journalists of the alternative magazine Mladina, including his friend Janez Janša, Bavčar became one of the founding members of the Committee for the Defence of Human Rights. The organization soon became the biggest civil society organization in Slovenia, with more than 100,000 members (almost 5% of the overall population of the country). In 1989, he coordinated the Assembly for the Constitution, an umbrella civil society network that connected initiatives for a new Slovenian constitution.

In 1989, he was among the founding members of the Slovenian Democratic Union. When the DEMOS coalition won the first free elections in Slovenia in April 1990, Bavčar became Minister of the Interior in the cabinet of Lojze Peterle. In this function, he became one of the main architects of the Slovenian path to independence from Yugoslavia. Together with the Minister of Defence Janez Janša, Bavčar organized the Slovenian defence during the Ten Day War in June and July 1991. After the split in the Slovenian Democratic Union in 1992, Bavčar became a member of the left liberal Democratic Party. After the crisis in the DEMOS coalition in early 1992, after the fall of Lojze Peterle's government, Bavčar unsuccessfully tried to get elected as Prime Minister. He finally joined the coalition government of Janez Drnovšek.

He was elected member of the National Assembly of Slovenia in 1992. In 1994, he joined the ruling Liberal Democracy of Slovenia. Between 1997 and 2002, he served as Minister for European integration in the left wing government of Janez Drnovšek. During this period, he parted with his old friend Janez Janša, who had joined the Slovenian Democratic Party and rose to become the leader of the conservative opposition.

== Business career and corruption charges ==
In 2002, Bavčar announced his withdrawal from politics. On the same year, he became the chairman of the Istrabenz holding company from Koper, which made him one of the most powerful managers in Slovenia. While heading the company, Bavčar attempted a management buyout of Istrabenz, which failed due to the 2008 financial crisis. On 31 March 2009 Bavčar resigned as the President of Istrabenz. Six months later he was arrested in financial fraud investigation and released after 10 hours. In September 2016, he was found guilty of money laundering and sentenced to 5 years of prison along with an 18 million euro penalty.

== See also ==
- JBTZ-trial

Political offices
Preceded by Tomaž Ertl	Minister of the Interior; 16 May 1990 – 25 January 1993	Succeeded by Ivan Bizjak
