= Jančić =

Jančić is a surname. It may refer to:

- Dušan Jančić
- Jovan Jančić, organizer of Jančić's rebellion, a 1809 rebellion by ethnic Serbs against the Ottomans
- Miroslav Jančić
- Olga Jančić (1929–2012), Serbian sculptor
- Peter Jančič
- Radovan Jančić
