= Debeljak =

Debeljak is a surname. It may refer to:

- Aleš Debeljak (1961–2016), Slovenian cultural critic, poet and essayist
- Erica Johnson Debeljak (born 1961), American-Slovenian writer and translator
- Greg Debeljak, American football player and coach
- Tine Debeljak (1903–1989), Slovenian literary critic, translator, editor and poet
- Vid Debeljak (born 1994); Slovenian canoeist
