= Veno Taufer =

Slovenian poet and essayist (1933–2023)

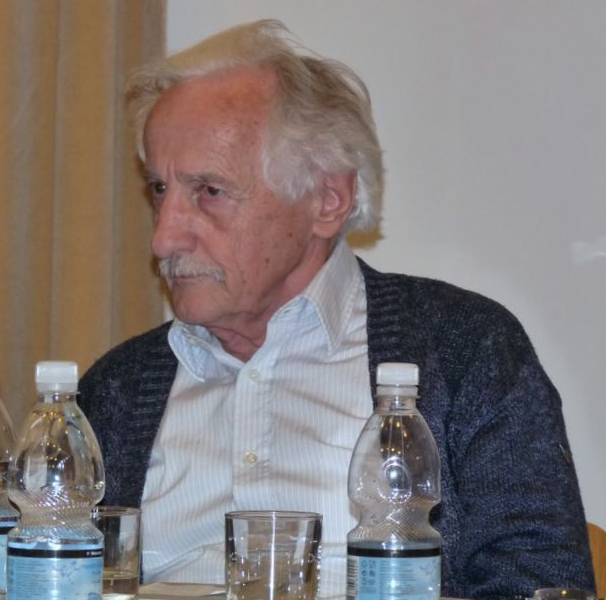
- Taufer in 2012
- Born: 19 February 1933; Ljubljana, Drava Banovina, Kingdom of Yugoslavia
- Died: 20 May 2023 (aged 90); Topolšica, Slovenia
- Occupations: Poet; playwright; essayist

Venčeslav "Veno" Taufer (19 February 1933 – 20 May 2023) was a Slovenian poet, essayist, translator and playwright. Under the Communist regime, he was a driving force behind alternative cultural and intellectual projects in Socialist Slovenia, which challenged the cultural policies of the Titoist system. During the Slovenian Spring (1988–1990), he actively participated in the efforts for the democratization and independence of Slovenia.

== Biography ==
Taufer was born Venčeslav Taufer in Ljubljana, Slovenia, then part of the Kingdom of Yugoslavia. His father was a left liberal activist, and prominent member of the Sokol athletic movement. Due to his political activities, he was transferred by the Yugoslav conservative regime to the heavily industrialized Central Sava Valley in central Slovenia, where Veno spent his childhood. In 1943, during the German occupation of Yugoslavia in World War II, his father was killed by the Nazis as one of the leaders of the local partisan resistance.

In 1944, he moved to Ljubljana, where he attended high school. He enrolled at the University of Ljubljana, where he studied comparative literature and graduated in history and literary theory in 1960. In the late 1950s, he became one of the initiators, together with Taras Kermauner, of a circle of young Slovene artists and intellectuals who challenged the rigid cultural policies of the Yugoslav Communist regime. In 1957, he became one of the co-editors of the literary journal Revija 57, the first autonomous journal in Slovenia prior to the Communist takeover in 1945. Due to its open criticism of the Communist regime, the journal was soon censored by the authorities and several of its collaborators, like Jože Pučnik and Taufer himself, were imprisoned.

In 1961, he briefly worked as an editor for the Slovenian Television service, but soon resigned in the face of political pressures. Between 1962 and 1964, he worked as the director of the alternative theatre Oder 57, staging innovative and subversive plays by Slovenian and foreign modernist authors, among them Dominik Smole, Primož Kozak and Marjan Rožanc. In the mid 1960s, he also collaborated on the alternative journal Perspektive, although he never joined its editorial board.

After the prohibition of the journal Perspektive in 1964, Taufer withdrew from public life, dedicating most of his time to translating. In 1966, he moved to London, where he worked at the Yugoslav section of the BBC. He returned to Slovenia in 1970, and was employed once again by the Slovenian television service, where he worked as an editor in the cultural programme section.

In the early 1980s, he was one of the founders of the new alternative journal Nova revija. Throughout the 1980s, he was active in the process of gradual pluralization of public life in Slovenia. In 1987, he joined the Committee for the Defence of Human Rights. He also participated in the so-called May Declaration of 1989, in which a group of Slovenian intellectuals and public activists openly demanded full democratization of the politics of the nation, the introduction of a market economy, and the separation of Slovenia from Yugoslavia. He was one of the co-founders of the Slovenian Democratic Union, one of the first anti-Communist political parties established in 1989.

Between 1990 and 1995, he worked as an advisor at the Ministry of Culture of Slovenia. In 1996, he received the Prešeren Award for life achievements.

In the 1990s, Taufer was supportive of various humanitarian activities during the Yugoslav Wars. During the war in Bosnia, he personally visited the besieged city of Sarajevo, together with Drago Jančar, Niko Grafenauer and Boris A. Novak, to take supplies collected by the Slovene Writers' Association to the civilian population.

In 2002 Taufer received the Jan Smrek Prize, the highest literature prize given to foreign writers in Slovakia. In 2011 he became president of the Slovene Writers' Association.

Taufer was the father of film director Lara Simona Taufer.

Veno Taufer died on 20 May 2023, at the age of 90.

== Work ==
Taufer began his public literary career in 1956 and 1957, when he published poems in the student journal Tribuna. During the period of 1958–72, he established himself as a poet. Other notable Slovenian poets of the time include, Gregor Strniša, Dane Zajc, Tomaž Šalamun, and Jože Snoj.

Taufer published a collection titled Lead Stars (Svinčene zvezde) in 1958. His second collection of poems, published in 1963, dealt mostly with love themes. His third collection, titled Exercises and Tasks (Vaje in naloge) and published in 1969, is considered to be Taufer's most daring poetic achievement. Taufer used extracts and collages in an accumulation of allusions to political reality, using parody in order to convey his message. In his later poetry in the 1970s, his literary experimentation went even further, marking the way to a complete transformation of poetic language, which would be then picked up by younger poets, especially by Tomaž Šalamun and Niko Grafenauer.

Taufer's poetry of the 1970s and 1980s has entered the canon of modern Slovenian literature. His Songbook of Used Words (Pesmarica rabljenih besed), published 1975, was conceived as a collection of contemporary variations on Slovene folk songs (especially ballads), and was declared by the philosopher and critic Tine Hribar as the first post-modern work in Slovenian literature. Taufer's next collection, The Management of Nails (Ravnanje žebljev), published 1979, was partly an exercise in linguistic experimentation.

The poems in the collection Water Marks (Vodenjaki), published 1986, record a story of chaos, and a decline of civilization, cultures, beliefs, ideas and values. The collection Crocks of Songs (Črepinje pesmi), published 1989, shows clear influences by Ezra Pound. The poems contained in this collection use fragments from ancient Greek myths, archaic images and visions of disasters, mobilized as an instrument of post-modern reality.

During the 1990s, his most important collection of poetry was Still Odes (Še ode), published 1996, which marks a return to classical poetic forms, mostly sonnets. The collection is opened by two poems containing a violent condemnation of the destruction of Vukovar and Sarajevo during the Yugoslav wars.

Taufer also wrote several plays. His best-known play is called Odysseus & Son or on the World and Home (1990), in which he renews the story of Odysseus and Telemachus, including whole passages from Homer's text, supplemented by fragments from diverse genres.
