= Nova revija (magazine) =

Slovene language literary magazine

- Categories: Literary magazine
- Publisher: Nova revija Publishing House
- Founded: 1982; 44 years ago
- Country: Slovenia
- Based in: Ljubljana
- Language: Slovene

Nova revija (Slovene for New Review or New Journal) is a Slovene language literary magazine published in Slovenia.

== History and profile ==
Nova revija was founded by Cankarjeva Publishing House in 1982, when the Titoist regime allowed a group of liberal and conservative critical intellectuals to publish an editorially entirely independent journal for the first time after the abolishment of the magazine Perspektive in 1964. The owner and publisher of the magazine is Nova revija Publishing House.

Already in 1980, shortly after the death of the Yugoslav president Josip Broz Tito, six Slovenian authors and intellectuals (columnist Dimitrij Rupel, philosopher Tine Hribar, poets Niko Grafenauer, Svetlana Makarovič and Boris A. Novak, and literary historian Andrej Inkret) submitted a petition to the authorities of the Socialist Republic of Slovenia in which they demanded to be allowed to publish a new independent journal. The petition maintained that the alternative magazine Problemi, which had served as the main critical publication in Slovenia since the mid-1960s, had been taken over by the Ljubljana Lacanian school, and that a new journal was needed. The petition was signed by over 60 public figures from Slovenia, which published a support letter in the daily magazine Delo. It took however two years before the journal was allowed to be published. The first issue appeared in 1982, under the simple name of Nova revija, meaning New Journal or New Review. The publishing board included intellectuals from different generations and different ideological positions. Their common feature was a critical stance towards the Communist regime, from a western perspective: either liberal, conservative, Christian democratic, or Social democratic.

In the mid-1980s, Nova revija became one of the chief voices of dissent in Slovenia, together with the left liberal popular magazine Mladina.

In 1987, the 57th issue of Nova revija was published, which included the Contributions to the Slovenian National Program, a plea for a democratic and sovereign Slovenia. In 1989, the intellectual group around the journal established the Slovenian Democratic Union, which soon emerged as one of the key political parties within the DEMOS coalition, a broad coalition that won the first free elections to the National Assembly of Slovenia in April 1990.

In the 1980s Nova revija had a circulation of 3,500 copies. Its circulation dropped to 1,500 copies in the 1990s.

After the independence of Slovenia in 1991, the magazine expanded into one of the most important cultural institutions in Slovenia.

== Contributors ==
Prominent authors, essayists, columnists, and thinkers have contributed to Nova revija, among them sociologists Jože Pučnik, Igor Škamperle, Gregor Tomc, Aleš Debeljak and Frane Adam; political analysts Viktor Blažič and Dimitrij Rupel; essayists Žarko Petan, Brane Senegačnik, Alenka Puhar, Spomenka Hribar, Andrej Capuder and Igor Senčar; poets Veno Taufer, Niko Grafenauer, Aleš Šteger, Jože Snoj, Boris A. Novak, Josip Osti, Dane Zajc, and Tomaž Šalamun; philosophers Tine Hribar, Ivo Urbančič and Dean Komel; legal experts France Bučar and Peter Jambrek; writers Rudi Šeligo, Lojze Kovačič, Alojz Rebula, Drago Jančar, and Boris Pahor; literary critics Taras Kermauner, Janko Kos and Simona Škrabec; historians Vasko Simoniti, Peter Vodopivec, Peter Štih, Igor Grdina, and Jože Pirjevec and many others. Many notable non-Slovene authors, especially dissidents from former Yugoslavia and the former Communist bloc, have contributed to the magazine, including Adam Michnik, Václav Havel, György Konrád, Dobrica Ćosić, and Vlado Gotovac. Western authors and columnist who have contributed to the magazine include Jacques Rupnik, Thomas Luckmann, Gianni Vattimo, and Fernando Savater.

The journal has published translations of foreign literates such as Naguib Mahfouz, Zbigniew Herbert, Wisława Szymborska, Peter Handke, Diego Marani, and Czeslaw Milosz, as well as theorists like Jan Patočka, Hannah Arendt, Charles Taylor, Jacques Derrida, François Furet, Francis Fukuyama, Jürgen Habermas, Niklas Luhmann, and Peter Szondi.

== See also ==
- List of magazines in Slovenia
