= Slovene Democratic Union =

Slovene Democratic Union can refer to two different political organizations:

- the Slovene Democratic Union (Slovene: Slovenska demokratična zveza, SDZ), a liberal democratic political party, active in the Free Territory of Trieste, and in the Italian Province of Gorizia between 1946 and 1962;
- the Slovenian Democratic Union (Slovene: Slovenska demokratična zveza, SDZ), a national liberal political party in Slovenia in the late 1980s and early 1990s, part of the DEMOS coalition.
