= Aleš Debeljak =

Slovenian cultural critic, poet, and essayist

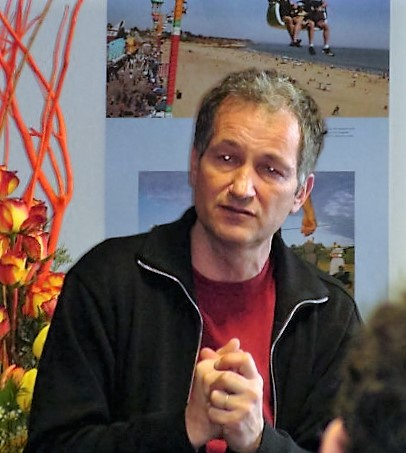
- Born: 25 December 1961; Ljubljana, Slovenia, Yugoslavia
- Died: 28 January 2016 (aged 54)
- Occupations: Poet; essayist; academic
- Spouse: Erica Johnson Debeljak
- Writing career
- Genres: essays, poetry, cultural studies
- Movement: Postmodernism

Aleš Debeljak (25 December 1961 – 28 January 2016) was a Slovenian cultural critic, poet, and essayist.

== Biography ==
Debeljak was born in the Slovenian capital, Ljubljana, then part of the Socialist Federal Republic of Yugoslavia, to a family with rural origins; he was the first of the family to attend university. In his youth he was the junior Slovenian champion in judo, and got a silver medal at the Yugoslav championship. He stopped his sport career after an injury.

He graduated from comparative literature at the University of Ljubljana in 1985. He continued his studies in the United States, obtaining a PhD in sociology of culture at Syracuse University in 1989. He was later a Senior Fulbright fellow at the University of California, Berkeley. He also worked at the Institute for Advanced Studies Collegium Budapest, the Civitella Ranieri Center and the Bogliasco Liguria Study Center for the Arts and Humanities.

From the mid-1980s onwards, Debeljak took an active part in civil society movements. He decided to come back to Slovenia at the time of the dissolution of Yugoslavia, as he said, he did not want to become a "Balkan-observer" from abroad, but rather wanted to take part directly in those moments.

As many others, he had come to accept the idea of Slovenian independence as a second-best option in the face of better alternatives, as every plan for reforming Yugoslavia while conceding more autonomy to Slovenia and Croatia had failed. He still retained and cherished his double identity as a Slovene and as a Yugoslav, and thought that independence had actually limited Slovenia's cultural references: "We lost our attachments to the people of the South, and at the same time we did not gain the same type of emotional attachment to Austria and to other European countries".

In 1991 he worked as an interpreter for foreign media during the Ten-Day War, and witnessed first-hand the Yugoslav-Slovene armed clashes at the Austrian border in Gornja Radgona. He described the experience as something that changed his point of view, as something that had been deemed impossible was actually taking place, "as if we were in a movie".

He was one of the co-editors of the critical alternative journal Nova revija. He also participated in the social liberal think tank Forum 21, led by former President of Slovenia Milan Kučan. He was also, until his death, a professor of cultural studies at the Faculty for Social Studies of the University of Ljubljana.

From 2001 he started the journal Sarajevo notebooks, in order to re-establish communication and linkages between intellectuals and activists throughout former Yugoslavia, and create regional public forums of reconciliation.

He was married to the columnist, translator and American-Slovenian writer Erica Johnson Debeljak, with whom he had three children. He died on 28 January 2016, when he was struck and killed by a truck.

== Poetic works ==
Debeljak began publishing poetry in his college years. He was spotted by the poet Veno Taufer who helped him in the literary scene. His first collection of poetry was well received also by the poet Tomaž Šalamun, who declared Debeljak as the best poet of the young generation of Slovene authors.

Debeljak's poetry is noted for its melancholy and a new reaffirmation of traditional values such as family and God. An opponent of everything-goes schools of modern thought, such as postmodernism, Debeljak's work was informed by an "Enlightenment" ideal of right and wrong, good and bad.

Debeljak was an extremely prolific writer. In addition to poetry and cultural criticism, Debeljak also worked as a columnist for the most important newspaper in Slovenia, Delo. His works have been translated in many languages.

== List of works ==
Works published or translated in English:

- The Hidden Handshake: National Identity and Europe in The Post Communist World (Rowman & Littlefield, New York & Oxford 2004).
- Reluctant Modernity: The Institution of Art and its Historical Forms (Rowman & Littlefield, Lanham & New York 1998).
- Twilight of the Idols: Recollections of a Lost Yugoslavia (Wite Pine Press, Fredonia & New York 1994).
- Persistence of Modernity: Critical Social Theory of Modern vs. Postmodern Institution of Art (UMI, Ann Arbor, 1994).
- Smugglers (BOA Editions, Ltd., Rochester, 2015)

== See also ==
- Slovene literature
- Culture of Slovenia
