= Rajko Pirnat =

Slovenian politician, lawyer, academic

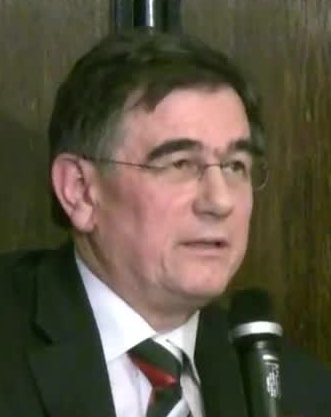
- Born: March 24, 1951 (age 75); Ljubljana, Yugoslavia
- Occupations: Politician, lawyer, law professor

Rajko Pirnat (born March 24, 1951, in Ljubljana, Yugoslavia) is a Slovenian politician, lawyer and academic.

The breakup of Yugoslavia in the 1980s led to the creation of several new states, among them Slovenia. From May 16, 1990, to May 14, 1992, Pirnat was the Minister of Justice for Slovenia as a member of the Slovenian Democratic Union. In that role, he introduced a denationalization act to undo some of the damage caused by unjust post-war expropriations from 1945 to 1963. When his party split, he led the new center-right National Democratic Party, but it fared very poorly in the 1992 Slovenian presidential and parliamentary elections.

He is a law professor at the University of Ljubljana and a former dean of its faculty of law. On March 23, 2005, he was appointed to the Joint Supervisory Board of Eurojust as Slovenia's representative and served as its chair from January to June 2008; he was still a member as of 2013.
