= Human trafficking in Slovenia =

Slovenia ratified the 2000 UN TIP Protocol in May 2004.

In 2008, Slovenia was a transit, destination, and to a lesser extent a source country for men, women, and children trafficked from Ukraine, Slovakia, Romania, Moldova, Bulgaria, Colombia, the Dominican Republic, Turkey, Albania, and Montenegro for the purposes of commercial sexual exploitation and forced labor, including in the construction industry. In 2007, disabled men from Slovakia were trafficked to Slovenia for the purpose of forced begging. Slovenian women are trafficked within the country or to other European countries for commercial sexual exploitation. The Government of Slovenia fully complies with the minimum standards for the elimination of trafficking. The government sustained its strong law enforcement efforts and generous victim assistance funding during the reporting period. In 2007, Slovenia increased funding for victim assistance from $85,000 to $105,000. The government also increased and diversified its public awareness efforts.

The U.S. State Department's Office to Monitor and Combat Trafficking in Persons placed the country in "Tier 1" in 2017. It was placed at Tier 2 in 2023.

From 2017 to 2021, the government identified 241 victims of human trafficking (an average of 60 per year), 85% of whom were female; while the government increased its funding in this area, there was a low number of criminal convictions.

In 2023, the Organised Crime Index gave the country a score of 4 out of 10 for human trafficking.

== Prosecution (2008) ==
The government demonstrated adequate law enforcement efforts in 2007. The government prohibits all forms of trafficking in persons through Article 387(a) of its criminal code, which prescribes penalties ranging from six months to 10 years' imprisonment. These penalties are sufficiently stringent and commensurate with those prescribed for other grave crimes, such as rape. Authorities conducted six trafficking investigations in 2007, up from three in 2006. Courts prosecuted three cases and convicted five traffickers in 2007, down from six cases prosecuted and seven traffickers convicted in 2006. Four traffickers were given sentences ranging from 15 to 57 months' imprisonment and one convicted trafficker served no time in prison. The Slovenian Police Directorate provided eight training sessions for 165 police officers during 2008.

== Protection (2008) ==
The Government of Slovenia provided quality victim assistance and protection during 2008, although the number of victims assisted and referred by government officials declined in 2007. The government provided $105,000 to two NGOs to provide both short-term and extended victim assistance including shelter, rehabilitative counseling, medical assistance, vocational training, and legal assistance. In 2007, these NGOs assisted 26 victims or potential victims compared to 43 victims assisted in 2006. The government continued to implement its formalized victim identification and referral mechanism during the reporting period; however, during the year, police referred only four victims to NGOs for assistance, down from 21 victims referred in 2006. After identification, victims were granted a 90-day reflection period, and were encouraged to participate in trafficking investigations and prosecutions; foreign victims who assist law enforcement are eligible to stay in Slovenia for the duration of the trial. Eight victims assisted law enforcement officials with trafficking investigations and prosecutions in 2007. Victims were not punished for unlawful acts committed as a direct result of being trafficked.

== Prevention (2008) ==
The government increased its prevention efforts during 2008. Slovenia continued to fund an NGO to provide trafficking awareness classes for students in elementary and secondary schools, reaching 400 students, parents, and teachers nationwide in 2007. With government funding, one NGO conducted a radio campaign simulating a trafficking victim's call to the NGO's hotline to encourage victims to seek assistance. In September 2007, the Ministry of Education introduced the theme of human trafficking into the standard Slovenian primary school curriculum. Slovenia continued to monitor its borders for evidence of trafficking. The government continued to provide Slovenian troops assigned to peacekeeping missions in Kosovo and Afghanistan with trafficking awareness training. The government has not taken any measures to reduce the demand for commercial sex acts.

== Notable cases ==
- Slovenian Path (since 2008) - the alleged trafficking with the girls from the Dominican Republic, working in Slovenia as bar dancers as well as prostitutes.

== See also ==
- Human trafficking in Europe
