= Democratic Party of Slovenia =

Political party in Slovenia

Democratic Party of Slovenia Demokratska stranka Slovenije
- Founded: December 21, 1991 (as Democratic Party)
- Dissolved: 2023
- Split from: Slovenian Democratic Union
- Ideology: Liberalism
- Political position: Center

The Democratic Party of Slovenia (Slovene: Demokratska stranka Slovenije) was an extra-parliamentary centrist political party in Slovenia. It was established in March 1994, when the majority of the then existing Democratic Party (Slovene: Demokratska stranka) led by Dimitrij Rupel joined the ruling Liberal Democracy of Slovenia. A minority of the party membership decided to stay in opposition and continue the legacy of the Democratic Party.

The Democratic Party was established in December 21, 1991 as the result of the split within the Slovenian Democratic Union. In May 1992, the party entered the coalition government of Janez Drnovšek, supported by the left wing of the former DEMOS coalition (besides the Democratic Party, also the Social Democratic Party of Slovenia and the Greens of Slovenia), the United List of Social Democrats and the Liberal Democratic Party. The Democrats retained three ministers in the government, Igor Bavčar (Interior), Dimitrij Rupel (Exterior) and Jelko Kacin (Information).

In the second free elections in Slovenia, celebrated in autumn of 1992, the party gained 5.01% of the vote and 6 MPs. In 1994, the majority of the party membership and 3 of its 6 MPs decided to join the Liberal Democracy of Slovenia. On March 12, 1994, the minority of the party's members re-founded the party and continued independent political activity. In the election of 1996, the Democratic Party received 3.3% of the vote and remained without parliamentary representation. In 2007, the party signed a cooperation agreement with the Social Democrats.

The party dissolved in 2023.

== Prominent members of the Democratic Party ==
- Dimitrij Rupel (left the party in 1994)
- Jelko Kacin (left the party in 1994)
- Igor Bavčar (left the party in 1994)
- France Bučar (left the party in 1993)
- Danica Simšič
- Jože Mencinger
- Tone Peršak
- Tine Hribar
- Spomenka Hribar

== See also ==
- National Democratic Party (Slovenia)
