= Jože Pučnik =

Slovenian politician (1932–2003)

- Pučnik in the late 1990s

Leader of the Social Democratic Party
- In office 1989 – May 1993
- Preceded by: France Tomšič
- Succeeded by: Janez Janša

Personal details
- Born: 9 March 1932 Črešnjevec, Yugoslavia
- Died: 11 January 2003 (aged 70) Dahlenburg, Germany
- Party: Social Democratic Party (1989–1994)
- Other political affiliations: DEMOS (1989–1992)

Jože Pučnik (9 March 1932 – 11 January 2003) was a Slovenian public intellectual, sociologist and politician. During the communist regime of Josip Broz Tito, he was one of the most outspoken Slovenian critics of dictatorship and lack of civil liberties in SFR Yugoslavia.

Pučnik was imprisoned for a total of seven years, and later forced into exile. After returning to Slovenia in the late 1980s, he became the leader of the Democratic Opposition of Slovenia, a platform of democratic parties that defeated the communists in the first free elections in 1990 and introduced a democratic system and market economy to Slovenia. Pučnik is also considered one of the fathers of Slovenian independence from Yugoslavia.

== Early life and formation ==
Pučnik was born in the village of Črešnjevec in Slovenian Styria (now part of the municipality of Slovenska Bistrica), in what was then the Kingdom of Yugoslavia. He came from a Roman Catholic peasant background. His family had supported the Liberation Front of the Slovenian People during World War II: his older brother Ivan was an anti-Nazi resistance fighter in the Yugoslav Partisan movement.

Already as a teenager, Pučnik clashed with the communist establishment. Because of some critical thoughts published in the high school paper Iskanja (Quests) he was prohibited from taking his final exam. Since he couldn't enroll in the university, he was drafted in the Yugoslav People's Army. After completing the military service, he took the final exam, passed it and enrolled at the University of Ljubljana, where he studied philosophy and comparative literature, graduating in 1958.

While living in Ljubljana, he became involved with a group of young intellectuals, known as the Critical generation, which tried to open a space for public debate and challenged the rigid cultural policies of the Titoist regime in the Socialist Republic of Slovenia. Among Pučnik's closest collaborators from that period were the literary historian Taras Kermauner, sociologist Veljko Rus, and poet Veno Taufer. Pučnik believed that the system could be changed from inside and therefore joined the Communist Party of Slovenia. At the same time, he published several articles in the journal Revija 57, in which he openly criticised the economic policies of the communist regime.

== The dissident years ==
In 1958, Pučnik was arrested accused of "subversion of the socialist system" and sentenced to 9 years in jail. At the trial, which lasted only a couple of hours, he was accused of having instigated workers to strike. Some have suggested that Pučnik's imprisonment was a deliberate attempt by the regime to silence dissident intellectuals. He was released in 1963 and immediately continued writing for the alternative journal Perspektive. At this point he was already publicly stating his disapproval of the regime. In 1964, his article Problemi našega kmetijstva (The Problems of Our Agriculture) was published in the journal Perspektive. In it, Pučnik criticized the agricultural policy of the regime, arguing that it was inefficient using publicly available official data. He was arrested again, sentenced to another two years in prison and expelled from the Communist Party.

During his time in prison, Pučnik became an idol for his generation. The playwright Dominik Smole dedicated the play Antigone to him and Primož Kozak portrayed him in the leading role of his play Afera (The Scandal). Both plays were metaphors for the totalitarian repression in communist Yugoslavia.

== Exile and academic career ==
Pučnik was released from jail in 1966. After several unsuccessful attempts to find a job, he decided to emigrate to West Germany. He settled in Hamburg, making a living from manual jobs. When he decided to enrol as a postgraduate student at the University of Hamburg, the University of Ljubljana refused to provide him with a copy of his degree. He thus enrolled again to undergraduate study of philosophy and sociology, obtaining his PhD in 1971. He worked at the universities of Hamburg and Lüneburg, where he taught sociology. During his life in Germany, Pučnik became a supporter of the German Social Democratic Party, maintaining close relations with several of its leaders. In the late 1980s, he became an open admirer of the Social Democratic leader of Lower Saxony Gerhard Schröder, later chancellor of Germany, whom he took as his main role model for his subsequent political activity.

In the academic sphere, he became influenced by the theories of Jürgen Habermas, Niklas Luhmann and his system theory, as well as by several phenomenological sociologists such as Alfred Schutz and the Slovene-born Thomas Luckmann.

During his years of exile, he kept up a correspondence with several important critical intellectuals in Slovenia, especially Ivo Urbančič.

== Return to Slovenia ==
In the 1980s, Pučnik could again publish articles in Slovenia, this time in the alternative journal Nova revija. In 1987, he co-authored the Contributions to the Slovenian National Program, published in the 57th issue of the Nova revija journal. The text was written as the response to the Memorandum of the Serbian Academy of Sciences and Arts of 1986, and set the grounds for a political opposition to the communist regime. It was also the first legally published publication openly advocating Slovenia's independence from Yugoslavia. Pučnik's article was centred on issues of democratization and political plurality, and openly stressed the need for Slovenia's full sovereignty in order to secure such development.

He returned to Slovenia in 1989 at the invitation of the newly formed opposition Social Democratic Union of Slovenia. He was elected president of the party in 1989 and the following year he was chosen as the leader of the Democratic Opposition of Slovenia, a common platform of all democratic opposition parties in Slovenia. The coalition won the first democratic elections in 1990. Pučnik ran for President of Slovenia but lost to Milan Kučan, the last secretary general of the Communist Party of Slovenia. He was nevertheless elected to the Slovenian Parliament and remained the official leader of the Democratic Opposition of Slovenia, and the coalition's parliamentary leader.

Between 1990 and 1992, he was among those who led Slovenia to independence from Yugoslavia. In 1992, after the fall of Lojze Peterle's coalition government, Pučnik decided to lead his party into a coalition with the Liberal Democratic Party and briefly served as vice-president in the first government of Janez Drnovšek.

In the elections of 1992, the Social Democratic Party of Slovenia suffered a complete defeat, gaining a mere 3.4% of the vote, barely securing the entry into the Parliament. Pučnik resigned as president of the party in favour of Janez Janša. Between 1992 and 1996, Pučnik served as a member of the National Assembly of Slovenia. During this time, he led a parliamentary commission to clarify political responsibility for the summary executions perpetrated by the communist regime in Slovenia after World War II .

After 1996, he retired from active politics, but remained honorary president of the Social Democratic Party of Slovenia and continued to voice his opinion on matters of public interest. He remained utterly critical of the policies of Prime Minister Janez Drnovšek and President Milan Kučan. He also criticized the political transition to democracy in general, especially the insufficient implementation of the rule of law, the widespread corruption and the maintenance of the power networks from the previous regime.

He died in Germany in 2003 and was buried in his home village of Črešnjevec. His funeral was attended by a huge crowd. The eulogy was delivered by philosopher and his lifelong friend Ivo Urbančič.

== Legacy ==
Pučnik is considered to be one of the fathers of independent Slovenia. Some, especially in the Slovenian right wing circles, have also called him "Father of Slovenian Democracy".

In 2006, he was posthumously awarded the Order of Distinct Merits of Slovenia. In 2007, the Government of Slovenia named the main international airport in Slovenia, the Ljubljana Jože Pučnik Airport, after him. The decision was criticized by some, including the then President of Slovenia Janez Drnovšek who publicly expressed his respect for Pučnik, but disagreed with the renaming of the airport after him. Author and journalist Spomenka Hribar, Pučnik's former colleague, stated that Pučnik would not have agreed with such renaming, because he was a modest person who disliked public praise and rejected any "cult of personality". A similar statement was made by Pučnik's son Gorazd, who however did not oppose the renaming and was present at the renaming ceremony.

The Slovenian liberal conservative think tank Jože Pučnik Institute and the elementary school in his native Črešnjevec are also named after him.

At the initiative of Milan Zver, the European Parliament announced on 11 June 2018 that a conference room will bear the name of Jože Pučnik. The official inauguration took place on 28 June 2018 in Brussels, where President of the European Parliament Antonio Tajani, Chairman of the EPP Group in the European Parliament Manfred Weber, President of Slovenia Borut Pahor, President of Slovenian Democratic Party Janez Janša and initiator Milan Zver were among the honorary speakers. Family of Jože Pučnik was present at the inauguration as well.

== Personal life ==
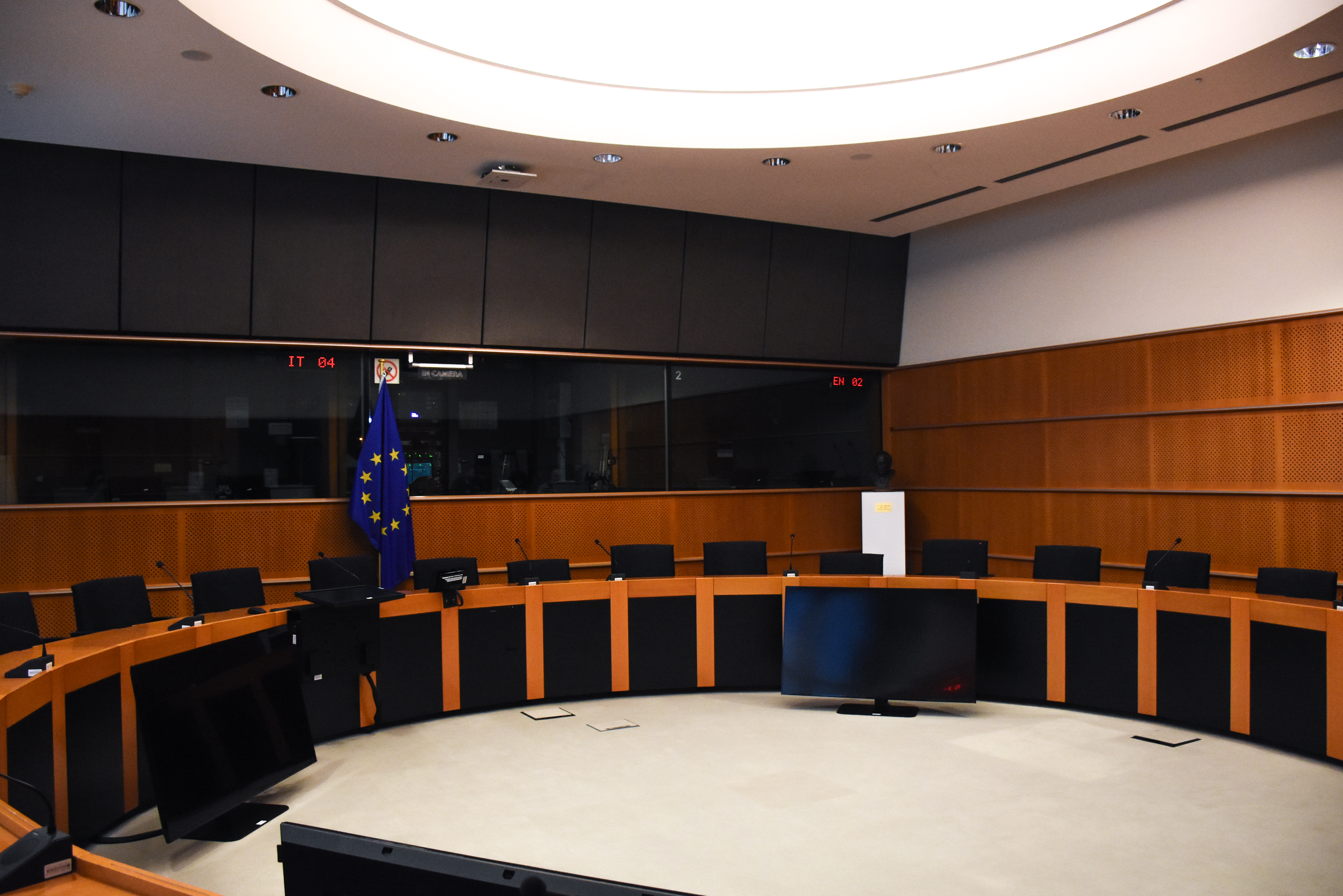
Jože Pučnik room in European Parliament, Brussels

Jože Pučnik was the brother of Ivan Pučnik, a farmer and politician, who was initially member of the Communist Party and later also became a dissident and co-founder of the Slovenian Peasant Union in 1989.

Jože Pučnik was married twice. After his first release from jail in 1963, he met Irena Žerjal, a young Slovene author from Trieste, Italy, who studied Slavic philology in Ljubljana. They married the same year, when Pučnik was already imprisoned again; Pučnik was not allowed to attend his own wedding, and his brother Ivan had to represent him at the ceremony instead. His first son was born in 1964. When Pučnik was released from prison in 1966, the family moved to Germany; in 1969, however, the wife decided to return to Trieste with the son, while Pučnik decided to stay in Germany. He later married Christel Kunath. They had a daughter named Katharina. He also adopted his second wife's son, called Marcus.

His son from his first marriage, Gorazd Pučnik, is the director of the Srečko Kosovel Boarding School in Trieste, Italy. His stepson Marcus Pucnik is a journalist, based in Barcelona, Spain.

== Major works ==
- Kultura, družba in tehnologija (Culture, Society and Technology, 1988).
- K političnemu sistemu Republike Slovenije (Towards a Political System of the Republic of Slovenia, 1990).
- Iz arhivov slovenske politične policije (From the Archives of the Slovenian Political Police, 1996).
- Izbrano delo (Selected Works, edited by Ivan Urbančič, Janez Janša et al., 2003).

== See also ==
- France Bučar
- Contributions to the Slovenian National Program
- Breakup of Yugoslavia
- Ten Day War
- Politics of Slovenia

== Sources ==
- Niko Grafenauer, "Beseda o Jožetu Pučniku" in Ampak 4(1) (January 2003), 10.
- Drago Jančar, "Stvar Jožeta Pučnika" in Konec tisočletja, račun stoletja (Ljubljana: Mladinska knjiga, 1999).
- Dean Komel, "Personal Freedom, Culture, and Politics" in Traditiones 43(1) (2014), 125–135, doi: 10.3986/Traditio2014430109.
- Božo Repe, "Človek, ki je pospeševal in radikaliziral dogodke: Jože Pučnik" in Delo 45(14) (January 15, 2003), 6.
- Rudi Šeligo, "Jože Pučnik: 1932–2003" in Ampak 4(1) (January 2003), 4–5.
- Ivan Urbančič, "Jože Pučnik 1932–2003" in Delo, 45(17) (January 22, 2003), 2.

Party political offices
Preceded by France Tomšič	President of the Social Democratic Party of Slovenia; 1990 – 1993	Succeeded by Janez Janša
