= Pogledi (disambiguation) =

Pogledi (Viewpoints) is the title of two magazines:

- Pogledi (Serbian Cyrillic: Погледи), a Serbian biweekly published between 1982 and 2005, the first opposition magazine in communist Yugoslavia
- Pogledi, a bimonthly cultural supplement to the Slovenian newspaper Delo
