= Bilećanka =

1940 Yugoslav song

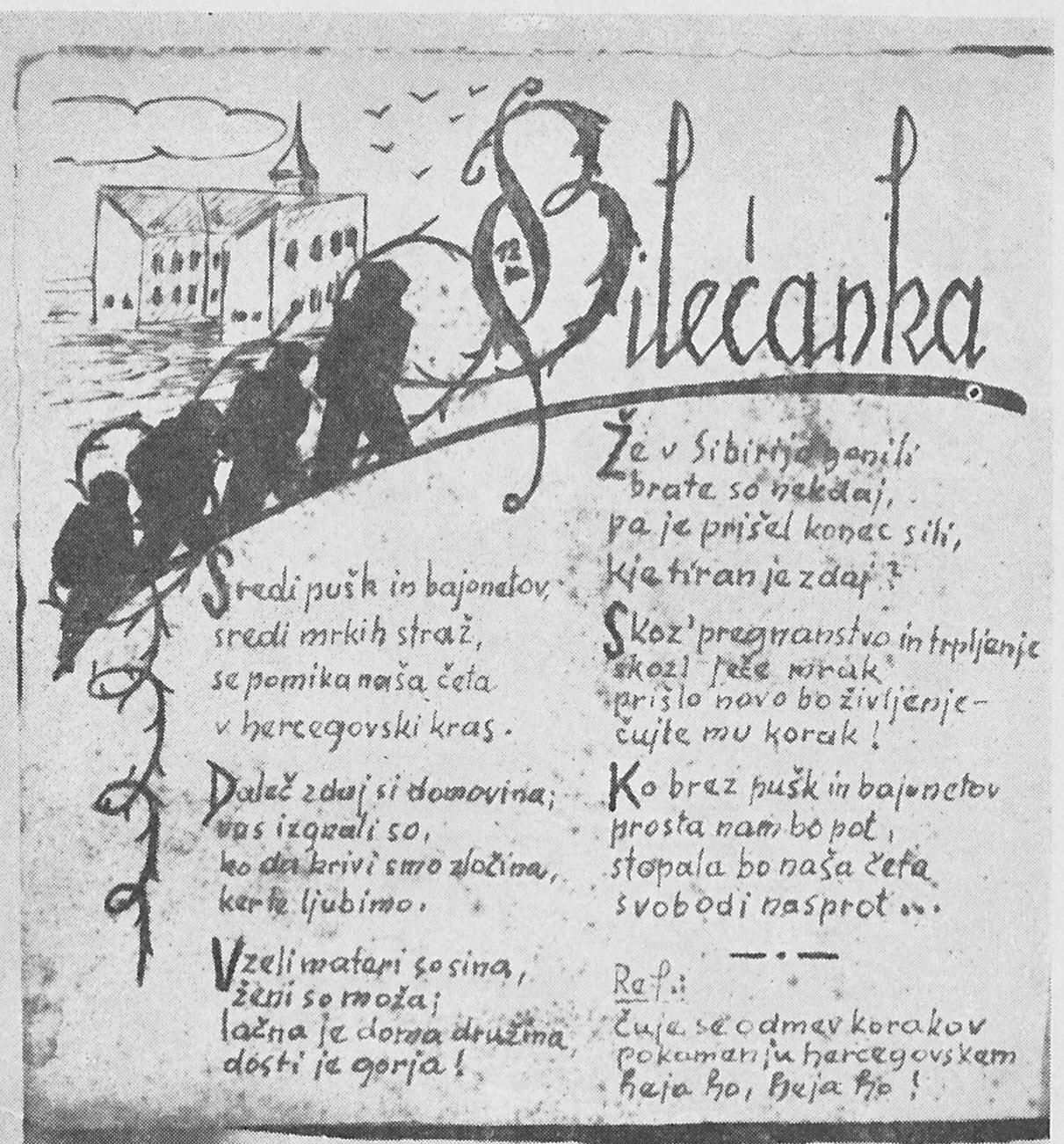
Bilečanka slovensko

"Bilećanka" (/ˌbiːlɪˈtʃæŋkə/; Serbian Cyrillic: Билећанка; Slovene: Bilečanka) is a Yugoslav song written in 1940 in a political prison camp in Bileća during the authoritarian regime of Prince Paul. The original Slovene lyrics were written by Milan Apih, a Slovene communist and teacher from Celje, who was imprisoned at the camp. It remained popular throughout Yugoslavia, and the song was also translated into Serbo-Croatian.

== Lyrics ==
Slovene original

Sredi pušk in bajonetov,
sredi mrkih straž
Se pomika naša četa
v hercegovski kras.

Refren:
Čuje se odmev korakov
Po kamenju hercegovskem
Heja ho!
Heja ho!

Daleč zdaj si domovina
nas izgnali so
Ko da krivi smo zločina,
ker te ljubimo.

Refren

Vzeli materi so sina,
ženi so moža
Lačna je doma družina,
dosti je gorja.

Refren

Že v Sibirijo gonili,
brate so nekdaj
Pa je prišel konec sili,
kje si zdaj tiran.

Refren

Skoz pregnanstvo in trpljenje,
skozi ječe mrak
Prišlo novo bo življenje,
čujte mu korak.

Refren

Ko brez pušk in bajonetov,
prosta nam bo pot
Stopala bo naša četa,
svobodi naprot'.

Refren

Serbo-Croatian version

Sred pušaka, bajoneta,
straže oko nas,
tiho kreće naša četa
kroz bilećki kras.

Pripev:
Čuje se odjek koraka
po kamenju hercegovskom;
Hej, haj, ho!
Hej, haj, ho!

Daleko si zavičaju,
mi prognani smo,
prognaše nas zbog zločina
što te ljubimo.

Pripev

Osta majka bez svog sina
žena bez druga
pusta osta kuća njina
gorka sudbina.

Pripev

Već u Sibiru gonili
braću su nekad
Pa je stigao konac sili
gdje si, tiranine, sad?

Pripev

Kroz progonstvo i trpljenje,
kroz tamnice mrak,
dolazi nam novi život,
čujte mu korak.

Pripev

Bez pušaka, bajoneta
bude li nam poć
stupat će naša četa
slobodi nasuprot.

Pripev

English translation

In the midst of rifles, bayonets,
Guards are all around us.
Our troops silently march
along Bileća stone.

Chorus:
Footsteps echo in the distance
on Herzegovinan stones.
Heya, ho! / Hey, hi, ho!
Heya, ho! / Hey, hi, ho!

Our homeland is now far from us,
We've been deported.
As if we were guilty of a crime
Just because we love you.

Chorus

A mother is left without her son,
A man is left without his wife.
The family is left hungry,
Bitter fate awaits.

Chorus

Already driven into Siberia,
They were once brothers.
Then came the end of the plight,
where are you now, tyrant?

Chorus

Through the suffering, persecution
through the dungeon's darkness,
a new life awaits us
hear the marking footsteps.

Chorus

As the rifles, bayonets,
Needed are no more,
Our company will be marching on
Facing freedom on.

Chorus
