= Vanja Sutlić =

Croatian philosopher

Vanja Sutlić (18 February 1925 – 15 December 1989) was a Yugoslavian philosopher. He was regarded as the father of the Heideggerian philosophy in Yugoslavia and its successor states, especially in Croatia and Slovenia.

He was born in Karlovac, Yugoslavia. He graduated from philosophy at the University of Zagreb, where he also obtained his PhD. In, he was hired as an assistant professor at the University, but in 1952 he was removed by the Yugoslav Communist authorities and forcibly transferred to Nova Gradiška. Already in 1953, he could return to Zagreb, continuing his teaching position. Between 1956 and 1964, he taught at the University of Sarajevo. Between 1964 until his death, he worked as a professor at the Faculty of Political Sciences of the University of Zagreb. He died in Zagreb in 1989.

Sutlić's main philosophical preoccupation was the thought of the German philosopher Martin Heidegger. Through Hedeggerian phenomenology, Sutlić engaged in reflections on the modern epoch, which he frequently referred to as "the world of Work". In dialogue with the philosophies of Karl Marx and Friedrich Nietzsche, he reflected on the meaning of modern nihilism, and the possibilities of its overcoming.

Sutlić's thought influenced several Yugoslav philosophers, including the Slovenes Ivo Urbančič, Veljko Rus and Tine Hribar, and the Serb Mihailo Đurić.

His son, also called Vanja Sutlić, is a film director and former chairman of the Croatian Radiotelevision.

== Major works ==
- Bit i suvremenost (Being and Modernity, 1967)
- Praksa rada kao znanstvena povijest (The Praxis of Work as History of Science, 1974)
- Kao čitati Heideggera (How to Read Heidegger, 1988)
- Uvod u povijesno mišljenje (Introduction into Historical Thought, published posthumously in 1994)
