= Drago Jančar =

Slovenian writer and playwright

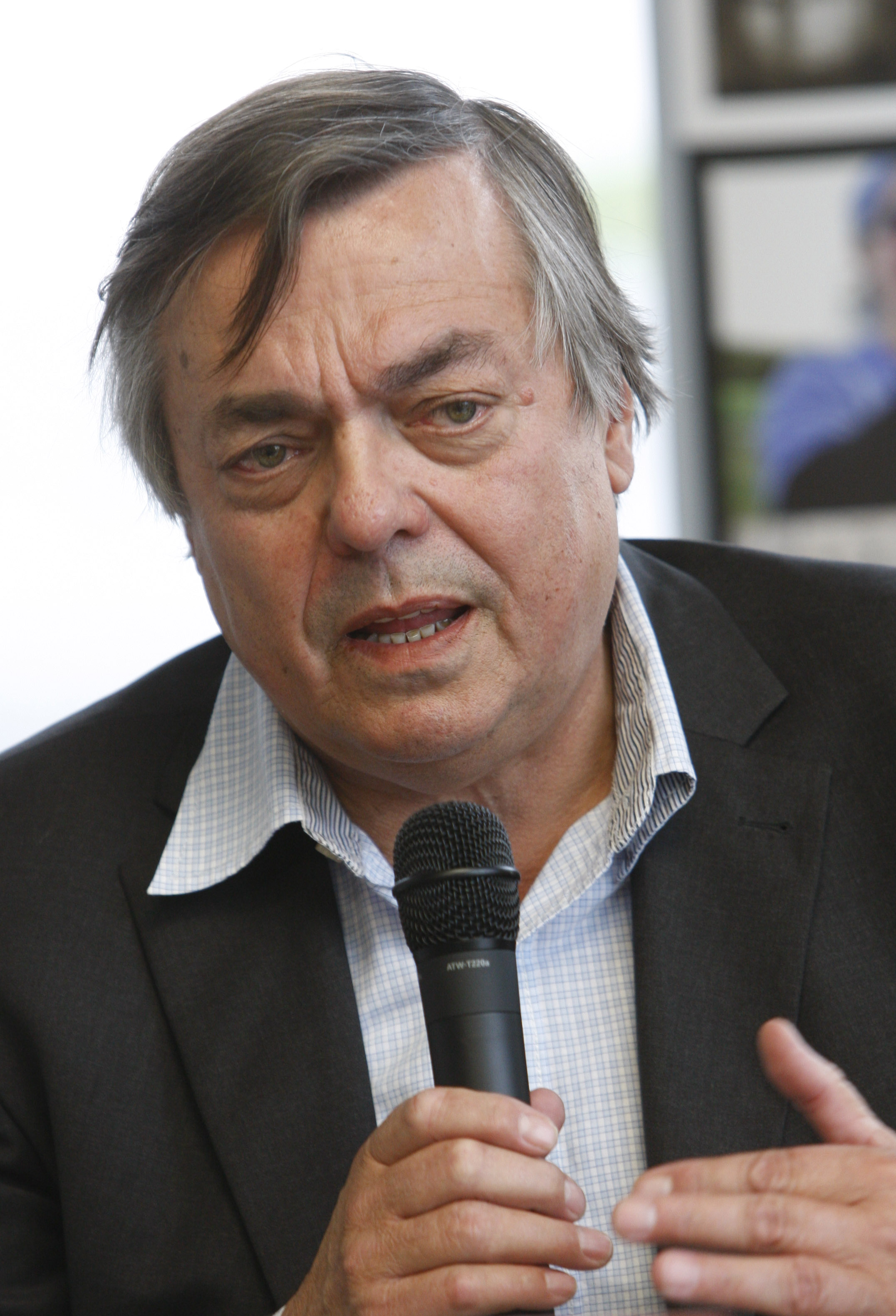
- Born: 13 April 1948 (age 78); Maribor, Yugoslavia (now in Slovenia)
- Occupations: Writer; essayist; playwright
- Writing career
- Literary movement: Postmodernism, Magical realism

Drago Jančar (pronounced [ˈdɾáːɡɔ ˈjàːntʃaɾ]; born 13 April 1948) is a Slovenian writer, playwright and essayist. Jančar is one of the best-known contemporary Slovene writers. In Slovenia, he is also known for his political commentaries and civic engagement. Jančar's novels, essays, and short stories have been translated into 21 languages and published in Europe, Asia, and the United States. The most numerous translations are into German, followed by Czech and Croatian.His plays have also been staged by a number of foreign theatres, and in Slovenia they are frequently considered the highlights of the theatrical season. He lives and works in Ljubljana.

== Life ==
He was born in Maribor, an industrial center in what was then the Yugoslav Socialist Republic of Slovenia. His father, originally from the Prekmurje region, joined the Slovene Partisans during World War II. Jančar studied law in his home town. While a student, he became the chief editor of the student journal Katedra; he soon came into conflict with the communist establishment because he published some articles critical of the ruling regime. He had to leave the journal. He soon found a job as an assistant at the Maribor daily newspaper Večer. In 1974 he was arrested by the Yugoslav authorities for bringing to Yugoslavia a booklet entitled V Rogu ležimo pobiti (We Lie Killed in the Rog Forest), which he had bought in nearby Austria and loaned to some friends. The booklet was a survivor's account of the Kočevski Rog massacres of the Slovene Home Guard war prisoners perpetrated by Josip Broz Tito's regime in May 1945. He was sentenced to a year's imprisonment for "spreading hostile propaganda" but was released after three months. Immediately after his release, he was called up for military service in southern Serbia, where he was subjected to systematic harassment by his superiors due to his "criminal record".

After completing military service, Jančar briefly returned to Večer, but he was allowed to perform only administrative work. He decided to move to Ljubljana, where he came into contact with several influential artists and intellectuals who were also critical of the cultural policies of the communist establishment, among them Edvard Kocbek, Ivan Urbančič, Alenka Puhar, Marjan Rožanc, and Rudi Šeligo. Between 1978 and 1980, he worked as a screenwriter in the film studio Viba Film, but he quit because his adaptation of Vitomil Zupan's script for Živojin Pavlović's movie See You in the Next War was censored. In 1981, he worked as a secretary for the Slovenska matica publishing house, where he is now an editor. In 1982, he was among the co-founders of the journal Nova revija, which soon emerged as the major alternative and opposition voice in communist Slovenia. He also befriended Boris Pahor, a Slovene writer from Trieste who wrote about his experience in the Nazi concentration camps. Jančar has frequently pointed out Pahor's profound influence on him, especially in the essay "The Man Who Said No" (1990), one of the first comprehensive assessments of Pahor's literary and moral role in the post-war era in Slovenia.

Early in his career, Jančar was not allowed to publish his works; however, when Kardelj's and Tito's deaths in the late 1970s led to gradual liberalisation, he was able to work as a screenwriter and playwright. In the mid-1980s, he gained initial success with his novels and short stories, and his plays earned recognition throughout Yugoslavia. Starting in the late 1980s, his fame began to grow outside the country, especially in Central Europe.

Since the early 1990s, he has worked as an editor at the Slovenska matica publishing house in Ljubljana.

== Work ==
Jančar started writing as a teenager. His first short novels were published by the magazine Mladina.

Jančar's prose is influenced by modernist models. One of the central themes of his works is the conflict between individuals and repressive institutions, such as prisons, galleys, psychiatric hospitals, and military barracks. He is known for his laconic and highly ironic style, which often makes use of tragicomic twists. Most of his novels explore concrete events and circumstances in Central European history, which he sees as an exemplification of the human condition.

He also writes essays and columns on the current political and cultural situation. During the war in Bosnia, he voiced his support for the Bosnian cause and personally visited the besieged Sarajevo to take supplies collected by the Slovene Writers' Association to the civilian population. In his essay "Short Report from a City Long Besieged" (Kratko poročilo iz dolgo obleganega mesta), he reflected on the war in Yugoslavia and the more general question of the ambiguous role of intellectuals in ethnic, national, and political conflicts.

Throughout the 1990s, he engaged in polemics with the Austrian writer Peter Handke regarding the dissolution of Yugoslavia.

== The public intellectual ==
Between 1987 and 1991, Jančar served as the president of the Slovene PEN Center and through this role also actively supported the emergence of Slovenian democracy. In 1987, he was among the authors of the Contributions to the Slovenian National Program, a manifesto calling for a democratic, pluralistic, and sovereign Slovenian state. During the Ljubljana trial in spring and summer 1988, he was one of the organizers of the first opposition political rally in Slovenia since 1945, which was held on the central Congress Square in Ljubljana. In the run-up to the first democratic elections in April 1990, Jančar actively campaigned for the opposition presidential candidate Jože Pučnik. During the Slovenian War of Independence, he and several other writers helped rally international support for Slovenia's independence.

Since 1995, he has been a member of the Slovenian Academy of Sciences and Arts.

In 2000, Slovenia's most widely read daily newspaper, Delo, published his controversial essay "Xenos and Xenophobia", which accused the Slovenian liberal media of inciting xenophobia and anti-Catholicism (Jančar himself is an agnostic). He had been accusing the liberal media of similar attitudes since 1994, when his essay "The Fleshpots of Egypt" blamed the media for having helped the rise of the chauvinistic Slovenian National Party.

Although Jančar has never actively participated in politics, he publicly supported the Slovenian Democratic Party during the general elections of 2000 and 2004.

In 2004, he was among the co-founders of the liberal conservative civic platform Rally for the Republic (Slovene: Zbor za republiko).

== Awards and honors ==
- 1993: Prešeren Award (1993) for his narratives, plays and essays
- 1994: European Short Story Award (Augsburg)
- 1999: Kresnik Award for best novel of the year: for Zvenenje v glavi (Ringing In The Head)
- 2001: Kresnik Award for best novel of the year: for Katarina, pav in jezuit (Catherine, the Peacock, and the Jesuit)
- 2003: Herder Prize for literature
- 2007: Jean Améry Prize for European essay-writing
- 2009: Premio Hemingway prize
- 2009: Premio Mediterraneo prize
- 2011: Kresnik Award for best novel of the year: for To noč sem jo videl (I Saw Her That Night)
- 2011: European Prize for Literature
- 2021: Honorary Doctor of the University of Maribor

== Selected bibliography ==
Novels

- Petintrideset stopinj (1974). Thirty-Five Degrees
- Galjot (1978). The Galley Slave, trans. Michael Biggins (2011).
- Severni sij (1984). Northern Lights, trans. Michael Biggins (2001).
- Pogled angela (1992). Angel's Gaze
- Posmehljivo poželenje (1993). Mocking Desire, trans. Michael Biggins (1998).
- Zvenenje v glavi (1998). Ringing in the Head
- Katarina, pav in jezuit (2000). Katarina, the Peacock and the Jesuit
- Graditelj (2006). The Builder
- Drevo brez imena (2008). The Tree with No Name, trans. Michael Biggins (2014).
- To noč sem jo videl (2010). I Saw Her That Night, trans. Michael Biggins (2016).
- In ljubezen tudi (2017). And Love Itself
- Ob nastanku sveta (2022). At the Creation of the World

Short story collections

- Romanje gospoda Houžvičke (1971). The Pilgrimage of Houžvičke
- O bledem hudodelcu (1978). About a Pale Criminal
- Smrt pri Mariji Snežni (1985). Death at Mary of the Snows
- Pogled angela (1992). The Look of an Angel
- Augsburg in druge resnične pripovedi (1994). Augsburg and Other True Stories
- Ultima kreatura (1995)
- Prikazen iz Rovenske (1998). The Specter from Rovenska
- Človek, ki je pogledal v tolmun (2004). The Man Who Looked into a Tarn
- Joyce's Pupil (2006). Trans. Alasdair MacKinnon, Lili Potpara and Andrew Baruch Wachtel. Selections from Smrt pri Mariji Snežni, Pogled angela, Augsburg, Ultima kreatura, and others.
- The Prophecy and Other Stories (2009). Trans. Andrew Baruch Wachtel. Selections from Smrt pri Mariji Snežni, Prikazen iz Rovenske, and Človek, ki je pogledal v tolmun.

Plays

- Disident Arnož in njegovi (1982). Dissident Arnož and His Band
- Veliki briljantni valček (1985). The Great Brilliant Waltz
- Vsi tirani mameluki so hud konec vzeli ... (1986). All Mameluk Tyrants Had a Bad End...
- Daedalus (1988)
- Klementov padec (1988). Klement's Fall
- Zalezujoč Godota (1988). Stakeout at Godot's, trans. Anne Čeh (1997).
- Halštat (1994)
- Severni sij (2005). Northern Lights
- Niha ura tiha (2007). The Silently Oscillating Clock

Essays

- Razbiti vrč (1992). The Broken Jug
- Egiptovski lonci mesa (1994). The Fleshpots of Egypt
- Brioni (2002)
- Duša Evrope (2006). Europe's Soul

== See also ==
- List of Slovenian writers
- Slovenian literature
- Culture of Slovenia
- Simona Škrabec
