= Slovenian Democratic Union =

Slovenian Democratic Union Slovenska Demokratična Zveza
- President: Dimitrji Rupel
- Founded: January 11, 1989
- Dissolved: 1991
- Succeeded by: Democratic Party of Slovenia; National Democratic Party
- Ideology: Conservatism; Slovene nationalism Liberalism; Faction: Social liberalism
- Political position: Centre-right; Faction: Centre-left

The Slovenian Democratic Union (Slovene: Slovenska demokratična zveza, acronym SDZ) was a Slovene liberal political party, active between 1989 and 1991, during the democratization and the secession of the Republic of Slovenia from Yugoslavia.

== History ==
The party was founded on 11 January 1989 in the Cankar Hall in Ljubljana, and Dimitrij Rupel was elected as its president. It was one of the first political party established in opposition to the Communist regime. It was founded mostly by intellectuals around the alternative journal Nova revija and it was initially called Slovenian Democratic Union of Reason.

In December 1989, it joined the Democratic Opposition of Slovenia, together with the Social Democratic Party of Slovenia, the Slovene Christian Democrats, the Slovenian People's Party and the Greens of Slovenia. In April 1990, the coalition won the first free elections in Slovenia after World War II, gaining around 55% of the popular vote. The Slovenian Democratic Union received around 9,5% of the vote, becoming the third largest party in the coalition and the fifth in the Slovenian National Assembly. Despite the relatively modest result, members of the party covered several key positions in the new cabinet led by the Christian Democrat Lojze Peterle, such as the Ministry of Interior, Defence, Justice, Information. Besides, the party member France Bučar was elected president of the Slovenian parliament.

After the independence of Slovenia, the party split into two. Its left liberal wing, led by the president Dimitrij Rupel, founded the Democratic Party, while the conservative wing, led by the minister of justice Rajko Pirnat established the centre-right National Democratic Party. In the election of 1992, both parties suffered a defeat. The Democratic Party gained 5,01% of the popular vote, and in 1994, most of its members joined the Liberal Democracy of Slovenia. The National Democratic Party obtained 2.18% of the vote and no seats in Parliament. In 1993, the National Democrats joined the Slovene Christian Democrats, and in 1995 they switched to the Slovenian Social Democratic Party.

Despite its relatively small popular support, the Slovenian Democratic Union was one of the most influential parties in Slovenia between 1988 and 1991. After its dissolution, its former members have become influential members of other political formations.

The legal successors of the Slovenian Democratic Union are the Slovenian Democratic Party and the Liberal Democracy of Slovenia.

== Prominent members ==
- Dimitrij Rupel
- Jelko Kacin
- Janez Janša
- Igor Bavčar
- France Bučar
- Tine Hribar
- Spomenka Hribar
- Peter Jambrek
- Rudi Šeligo
- Veno Taufer
- Ivo Urbančič
- Peter Vodopivec
- Tone Peršak

== See also ==
- Contributions to the Slovenian National Program
- Committee for the Defence of Human Rights
- Liberalism in Slovenia
