= Slovene Path =

Alleged human trafficking route

The Slovene Path (Spanish: La ruta eslovena, Slovene: Slovenska pot) is the alleged path of human trafficking, leading from the Dominican Republic into Slovenia. Since 2008, the Slovene Embassy in Buenos Aires has issued about 270 work permits to girls from the Dominican Republic who then worked as bar dancers in Slovenia. In addition, according to the newspaper Delo, the girls have been forced into prostitution and abused in other ways. Slovenia has been warned by several Argentine humanitarian organisations (e.g. La Casa del Encuentro) as well as the Argentine government and the American State Department that they have spotted elements of human trafficking in relation to their resettlement. The Buenos Aires Embassy has notified different institutions in Slovenia about their suspicions regarding human trafficking, but has not had any lever to reject the issuing of work permits. The Slovene Labour Inspectorate has not noticed any irregularities.
