= Contributions to the Slovene National Program =

Journal edition

Contributions to the Slovene National Program (Slovene: Prispevki za slovenski nacionalni program), also known as Nova revija 57 or 57th edition of Nova revija (Slovene: 57. številka Nove revije) was a special issue of the Slovene opposition intellectual journal Nova revija, published in January 1987. It contained 16 articles by non-Communist and anti-Communist dissidents in the Socialist Republic of Slovenia, discussing the possibilities and conditions for the democratization of Slovenia and the achievement of full sovereignty. It was issued as a reaction to the Memorandum of the Serbian Academy of Sciences and Arts and to the rising centralist aspirations within the Communist Party of Yugoslavia.

The authors of the Contributions analyzed the different aspects of political and social conditions in Slovenia, especially in its relations to Yugoslavia. Most of the contributors called for the establishment of a sovereign, democratic and pluralist Slovene state, although direct demands for independence were not uttered.

The publication provoked a scandal throughout former Yugoslavia. The editors of Nova revija were called to defend themselves in a state-sponsored public discussion, organized by the Socialist Alliance of the Working People. The editorial board was forced to step down, but no public prosecution was conducted against any of the authors, and the journal could continue issuing without restrictions.

The publications is usually considered as the direct prelude of the so-called Slovene Spring, a mass political movement for democratization that started the following year by protests against the Ljubljana trial against four journalists arrested by the Yugoslav military police.

In the following years, many of the authors of the Contributions became active in the political parties of the DEMOS coalition, especially the Slovene Democratic Union.

== Contributions ==
- Tine Hribar: Slovene Statehood
- Ivan Urbančič: The Yugoslav "Nationalist Crisis" and the Slovenes in the Perspective of the End of Nation
- Dimitrij Rupel: An Answer to the Slovene National Question
- Spomenka Hribar: Avantgarde Hatred and Conciliation
- Veljko Namorš: On the Use of the Slovene Language in the Yugoslav People's Army
- Alenka Goljavšček: The Archaic and the Civic
- Jože Pučnik: The Political System of Civil Society
- Gregor Tomc: Civil Society under the Slovene Socialism
- France Bučar: The Legal Arrangement of the Slovenes as a Nation
- Peter Jambrek: The Right of Self-Determination of the Slovene Nation
- Janez Jerovšek: The Slovene University Yesterday, Today, Tomorrow
- Veljko Rus: The Slovenes and an Integrative Social Policy
- Marjan Rožanc: Some Irrational Dimensions
- Jože Snoj: The Modern Christian and the Absurdity of Slovene Identity
- Drago Jančar: Slovene Exile
- Niko Grafenauer: Forms of Slovene Suicide

== See also ==
- Committee for the Defence of Human Rights
- Republic of Slovenia (1990-1991)
- Breakup of Yugoslavia
- Ten Day War
- History of Slovenia
- History of Yugoslavia
