= France Bučar =

Slovenian politician, legal expert and author

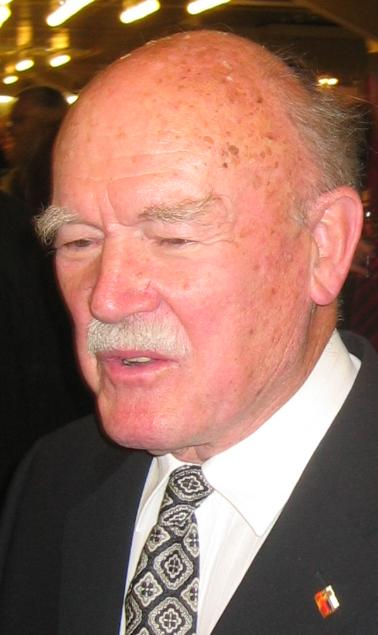

1st Speaker of the National Assembly of Slovenia
- In office 17 May 1990 – 23 December 1992
- Preceded by: New position
- Succeeded by: Herman Rigelnik

Personal details
- Born: 2 February 1923 Bohinjska Bistrica, Kingdom of Serbs, Croats and Slovenes
- Died: 21 October 2015 (aged 92) Bohinjska Bistrica, Slovenia
- Party: Slovenian Democratic Union
- Spouse: Ivka Bučar
- Education: University of Ljubljana
- Profession: Lawyer, Academic, Politologist

France Bučar (2 February 1923 – 21 October 2015) was a Slovenian politician, legal expert and author. Between 1990 and 1992, he served as the first speaker of the freely elected Slovenian Parliament. He was the one to formally declare the independence of Slovenia on 25 June 1991. He is considered one of the founding fathers of Slovenian democracy and independence. He is also considered, together with Peter Jambrek, the main author of the current Slovenian constitution.

== Biography ==
Bučar was born in the small Upper Carniolan town of Bohinjska Bistrica in what was then the Kingdom of Serbs, Croats and Slovenes, now in Slovenia. After graduating from the St. Stanislaus Institute in Šentvid near Ljubljana, he enrolled in the University of Ljubljana, where he studied law. After the Axis invasion of Yugoslavia, Bučar joined the Liberation Front of the Slovenian People. In May 1942, he was arrested by the Italian Fascist authorities and sent to the Gonars concentration camp. After the Italian armistice, he returned home, but was arrested by the Nazis. In July 1944, he escaped and joined the Partisan resistance in southern Carinthia. In 1944, he joined the Communist Party of Slovenia, after a guarantee that he could keep his Roman Catholic religious affiliation. In May 1945, he was in the military unit that liberated Klagenfurt.

After the end of the war, Bučar was included in the Slovenian division of the Corps of National Defence (later renamed to OZNA), a Yugoslav military counter-intelligence service. He was demobilized in 1946. In 1947 he graduated from law at the University of Ljubljana. Between 1947 and 1956, he worked as an expert on economic law in the government of the Socialist Republic of Slovenia. In 1956, he obtained his PhD at the University of Zagreb and moved to Belgrade, where he worked as a secretary in the Ministry of Foreign Commerce for one year. In 1957, he became a legal consultant of the Republic Assembly (State Parliament) of Slovenia. In 1959, he travelled to the United States as an Eisenhower Exchange Fellow, studying for ten months at the University of Philadelphia.

In 1962, he started teaching public administration at the Faculty of Law of the University of Ljubljana. During this period, Bučar started openly voicing his criticism to certain features of the Yugoslav Communist system, especially the excessive centralism and the not entirely successful economic integration of the different regions of Yugoslavia. In 1963, he was excluded from the Communist Party. He continued teaching at the university, where he grew increasingly popular among students; in an environment that was skeptical to non-Marxist social theories, Bučar expanded the curriculum by introducing system theory and the thought of Max Weber. Unlike other prominent faculty, Bučar assumed a skeptical attitude towards the student movement in the years 1968–1972.

After 1968, he published numerous articles criticizing the establishment of large business systems in Yugoslavia, the frequent changes in the legal framework and the lack of clear responsibilities in decision-making processes. In 1976, he was fired from the university and was not allowed to publish anything for five years.

In the 1980s, he started collaborating with the alternative journal Nova revija. In early 1988, he was invited to speak at the European Parliament; he caused a scandal in Yugoslavia by proposing to block all economic aid to the socialist countries of Eastern Europe in order to force them to adopt economic and political reform.

In 1989, he was among the co-founders of the Slovenian Democratic Union, one of the first opposition parties to the Communist regime in Slovenia. After the victory of the DEMOS coalition in the first free elections in Slovenia in 1990, Bučar was elected as the Chairman of the Slovenian National Assembly. As the speaker of the Parliament and member of the Constitution Committee, Bučar had a crucial role in the adoption of the new Slovenian constitution. During this period, Bučar insisted on providing a sound legal basis for Slovenia's independence from Yugoslavia, and rejected all voluntaristic political actions, gaining a label of legalist.

After the split in the Slovenian Democratic Union, Bučar joined the Democratic Party led by Dimitrij Rupel. He was re-elected to the National Assembly in 1992 and became the chairman of the Committee for the Control over the Secret Service. In 1993, he left the party, remaining an independent MP until the elections of 1996.

In 1996, he unsuccessfully ran as mayor of Ljubljana backed by a coalition of centre-right parties. In 2002, he unsuccessfully ran for President of Slovenia as an independent candidate.

Until May 2012, he was the president of the International Paneuropean Union for Slovenia.

In June 2012, Bučar stated in an interview for the magazine Mladina that the democracy in Slovenia was very weak, with the power concentrated in the hands of a few people, as in the time of the Socialist Republic of Slovenia before 1991, and that the Parliament was only a formal institution.

Bučar lived in Ljubljana. Besides Slovene, he was fluent in German, English, and Serbo-Croatian. He died on 21 October 2015 at the age of 92.

== Major works ==
- Naš bodoči razvoj (Our Future Development; Ljubljana, 1961)
- Pot napredka (The Path of Progress; Ljubljana, 1961)
- Kakšen gospodarski sistem? (What Kind of Economic System? Ljubljana, 1963)
- Podjetje in družba (Business and Society; Ljubljana, 1972)
- Upravljanje (Administration; Ljubljana, 1981)
- Resničnost in utvara (Reality and Illusion; Maribor, 1986)
- Usodne odločitve (Fatal Decisions; Ljubljana, 1988)
- Prehod čez Rdeče morje (Crossing the Red Sea; Ljubljana, 1993)
- Ujetniki preteklosti (Prisoners of the Past; Ljubljana, 1995)
- Slovenija in evropski izzivi (Slovenia and the European Challenges; Ljubljana, 1996)
- Demokracija in kriza naših ustavnih inštitucij (Democracy and the Crisis of Our Constitutional Institutions; Ljubljana, 1998)
- Porušena harmonija sveta (The Destroyed Harmony of the World; Dob pri Domžalah, 2003)
- Na novih razpotjih (At New Crossroads; Celje, 2006)
- Rojstvo države (Birth of a Nation; Radovljica, 2007)
- Slovenci in prihodnost (The Slovenians and the Future; Radovljica, 2009)
- Temelji naše državnosti (Foundations of Our Statehood; Ljubljana, 2012)

== See also ==
- Jože Pučnik
- Contributions to the Slovenian National Program
- Breakup of Yugoslavia
- 2002 Slovenian presidential election

Political offices
New title	Speaker of the National Assembly of Slovenia; 9 May 1990 – 17 December 1992	Succeeded by Herman Rigelnik
