= Erica Johnson Debeljak =

American-Slovenian writer (born 1961)

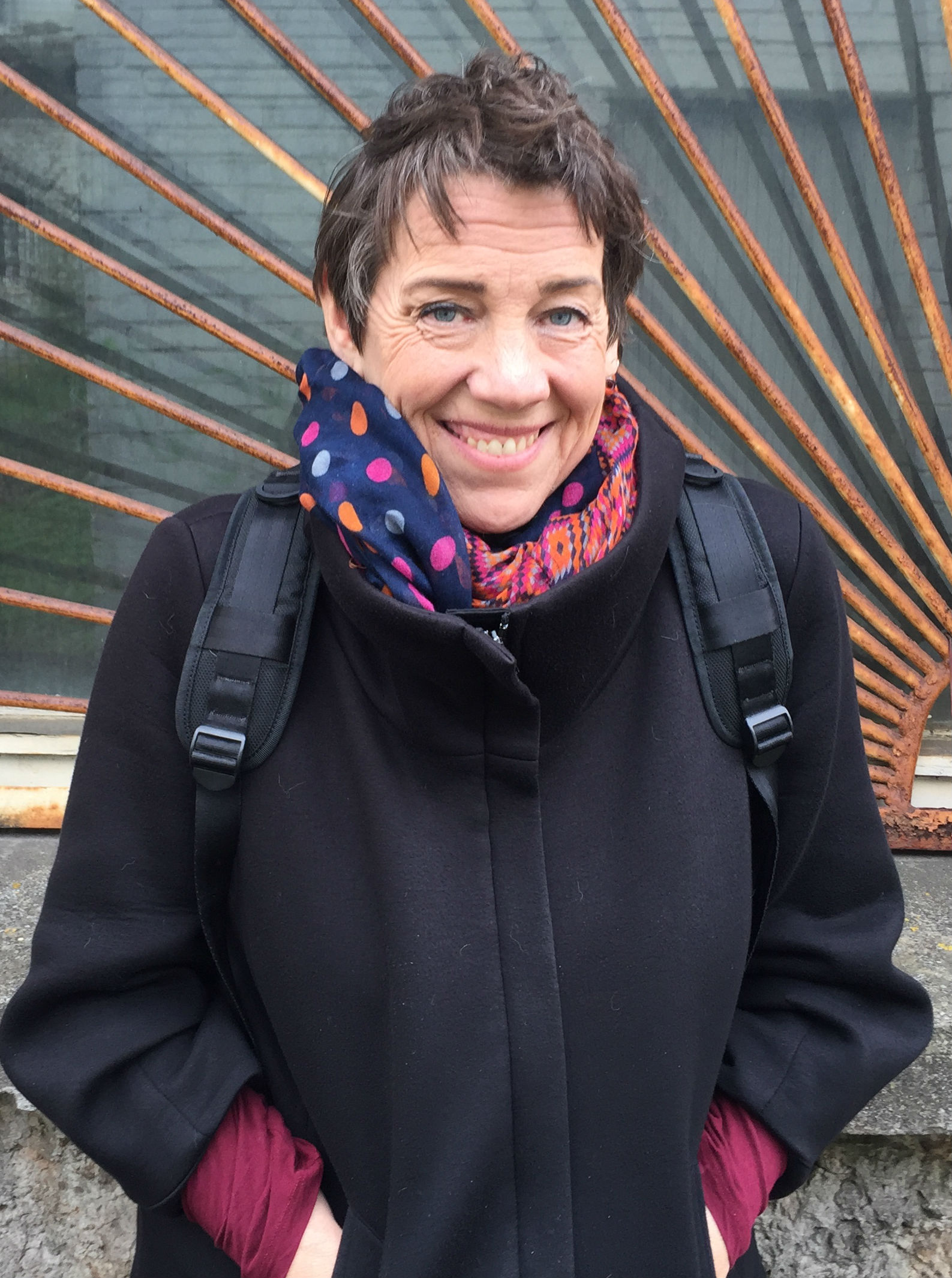
Erica Johnson Debeljak, US-born author who lives and works in Slovenia

Erica Johnson Debeljak (born 1961) is an American-Slovenian writer and translator, an American expatriate living in Slovenia.

== Life ==
Erica Johnson was born in San Francisco. She studied in New York City, where she received a degree from financial economics and French literature. In early 1990s, she followed her later husband, Slovene poet Aleš Debeljak, and moved from U.S. to Slovenia. They had three children together. She lives in Ljubljana.

== Work ==
From 1987 to 1993, she worked as a financial analyst at the French government-owned Banque Nationale de Paris and as lender to the major Wall Street firms.

After moving to Slovenia, she has worked as a translator and columnist for the national newspaper Delo. Her essays and stories have also appeared in U.S. News & World Report, Glimmer Train, Prairie Schooner, The Missouri Review, Nimrod, Epoch, Common Knowledge, and Eurozine. Barren Harvest: The Selected Poems of Dane Zajc, she translated in 2004, was published by White Pine Press.

She has published a number of books both in Slovenian and English, including two memoirs (Foreigner in the House of Natives and Forbidden Bread), a biography of Srečko Kosovel titled Srečko Kosovel: Pesnik in jaz, and a novel Anti-Fa cona.

== Awards ==
- 2007 Family Matters Award
