= Nina Krajnik =

Slovenian philosopher and psychoanalyst

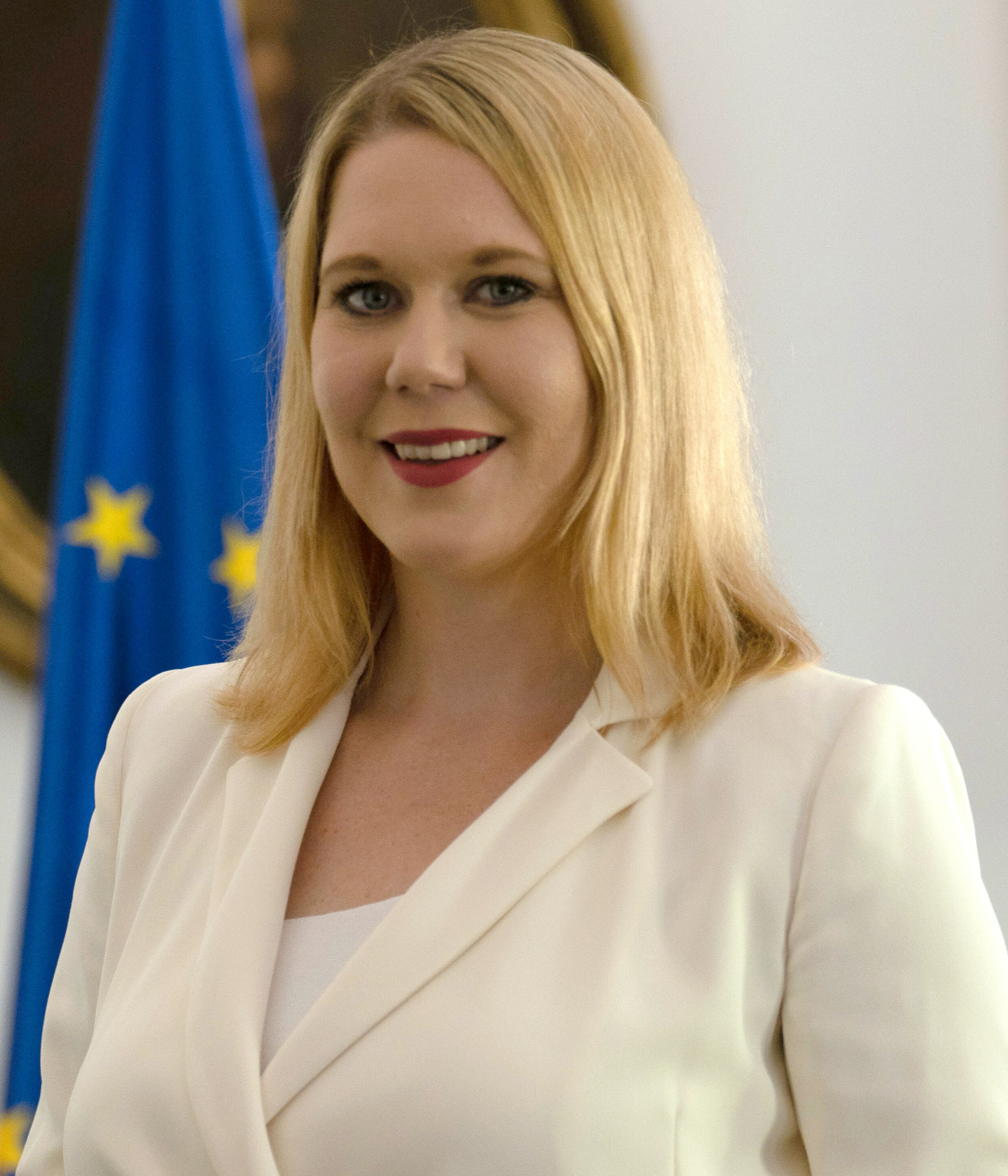
- Born: 9 June 1985 (age 41); Kranj, SR Slovenia, Yugoslavia
- Education: University of Ljubljana; University Paris 8 Vincennes-Saint-Denis
- Occupations: Philosopher, psychoanalyst, writer
- Known for: Work in Lacanian psychoanalysis
- Website: www.ninakrajnik.com

Nina Krajnik (born 9 June 1985) is a Slovenian psychoanalyst, philosopher and writer who has been active in politics in Slovenia, including the 2022 Slovenian presidential election.

== Education ==
Krajnik graduated from the University of Ljubljana in 2009 with a bachelor's thesis about the James Joyce novel Finnegans Wake and philosophy. She has a MA in cultural studies and a PhD in philosophy.

== Career ==
=== Academics ===
In 2015, Krajnik founded the Slovenian Association for Lacanian Psychoanalysis. She also established a related organization, Lakan Balkan (Lacan Balkan). She has given lectures about psychoanalysis and philosophy. As of 2022, she was the head of a department of Lacanian psychoanalysis at Sigmund Freud Private University in Ljubljana. She founded the book series Juno.

In 2017, Krajnik criticized Slavoj Žižek, associated with the Ljubljana school of psychoanalysis, including describing his work as fraudulent because he works in theoretical psychoanalysis rather than clinical practice. A group of Latin American academics described her criticisms as "unfounded" and an effort to promote the school of thought of the World Association of Psychoanalysis over other interpretations of Lacan.

In 2023–2024, during the Russo-Ukrainian war, she visited Ukraine and wrote about what she observed. She later met with the ambassador of Ukraine to Slovenia and worked with the embassy of Ukraine in Ljubljana and the Ukrainian cultural society Ljubljana-Kyiv to organize a "Slovenia for Ukraine" event.

=== Politics ===
In 2022, Krajnik gave television interviews where she criticized Slovenian news media, privatisation of social property in the 1990s, the Slovenian left, and the "deep state" in Slovenia, among other topics. Her television comments on the 2022 Slovenian parliamentary election and in other interviews, including with Jože Možina, drew interest from the Slovenian right.

On June 25, 2022, Krajnik announced her intent to run as an independent candidate in the 2022 Slovenian presidential election. She was endorsed by some conservatives, including former Constitutional Court of Slovenia judge Peter Jambrek. The newspaper Vijesti described her as "little known to the general public". She promoted what she termed a politics of singularity. She described her political positions as not traditionally left or right. As one of her credentials, she noted her leadership in introducing philosophy to children in preschool, although the Slovenian Philosophical Society disputed whether she was the first to do so. In July, a poll found support for Krajnik from 1.3% of voters, and another poll in August found 0.8% support. In September 2022, when official registrations for candidates were due, she announced that she decided not to run for president.
