= Jože Snoj =

Slovenian writer (1934–2021)

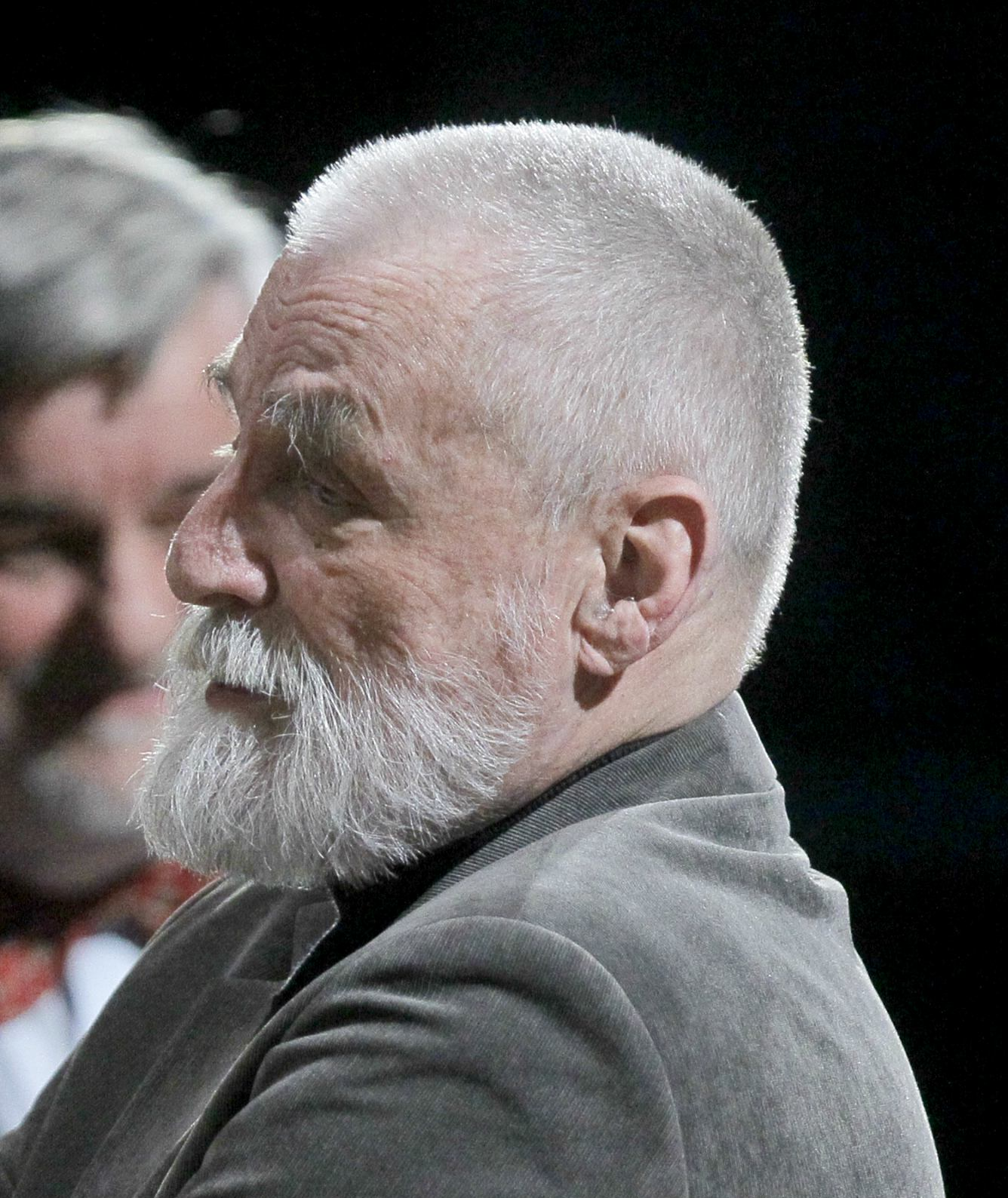
- Snoj in 2012
- Born: 17 March 1934; Maribor, Drava Banovina, Kingdom of Yugoslavia (now in Slovenia)
- Died: 7 October 2021 (aged 87)
- Occupations: Poet, writer, essayist
- Children: Vid Snoj
- Writing career
- Notable works: Negativ Gojka Mrča, Poslikava notranjščine, Kažipoti brezpotij, Med besedo in Bogom
- Notable awards: Rožanc Award; 1994 for Med besedo in bogom Jenko Award; 2004 for Poslikava notranjščine Veronika Award; 2009 for Kažipoti brezpotij Prešeren Award; 2012 for his lifetime work and his rich literary opus
- Literary movement: Modernism
- Website: www2.arnes.si/~jsnoj2/index-en.htm

Jože Snoj (17 March 1934 – 7 October 2021) was a Slovenian poet, novelist, journalist and essayist. He was awarded the 2012 Prešeren Award for his lifetime work and rich literary opus.

He was born in Maribor, then part of the Kingdom of Yugoslavia, into a wealthy Slovene family. His uncle, Franc Snoj, was a prominent member of the Slovene People's Party and a minister in the Royal Yugoslav Government. In April 1941, after the invasion of Yugoslavia he escaped with his family from the Nazis to the Italian-occupied Lower Carniola. From there, the family had to flee again to Ljubljana in order to escape persecution by the Communist-led partisan movement. In 1947, his uncle Franc Snoj was sentenced to 20 years imprisonment in a staged trial together with other liberal and social democrats who tried to organize a legal opposition to Josip Broz Tito's Communist regime (the so-called Nagode's trial). These experiences deeply influenced Jože Snoj's later literary opus.

After graduation in Slavic philology at the University of Ljubljana he started working as a reporter for the newspaper Delo. Together with Dane Zajc, Gregor Strniša, Dominik Smole, Marjan Rožanc, and others, he was part of the generation which, influenced by the "modernist turn" of the poet Edvard Kocbek, strongly challenged the literary canon established by the Communist regime. In 1963 he published his first collection of poetry, Mlin stooki ("The Mill with Hundred Eyes"), which was strongly criticised by the literary establishment for its supposedly decadent and nihilist content. Snoj later moved closer to Catholicism, expressing religious and metaphysical preoccupations in works as Žalostinka za očetom in očetnjavo ("Elegy for Father and Fatherland") and Duhovne pesmi ("Spiritual Poems"). Among his novels, the most famous are Gavženhrib ("Gallows Hill"), an autobiographical novel about his war childhood, in which he explores the sources of evil, and Jožef ali zgodnje odkrivanje srčnega raka ("Joseph or the Early Diagnosis of Heart Cancer"), in which he placed the ancient archetypal figure of Joseph in a magical realist setting, in which modern and archaic intermingle.

== See also ==
- Josip Murn
- Contributions to the Slovenian National Program
