= Tomaž Ertl =

Slovenian politician

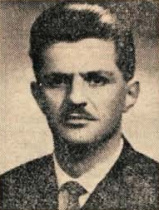
Tomaž Ertl in 1968

Tomaž Ertl (16 November 1932 – 11 November 2012) was a Slovenian politician. He was the Interior Minister of what was then the Socialist Republic of Slovenia, just prior to its independence from Yugoslavia in 1990. He was also chief of the Slovenian branch of the State Security Administration (UDBA) – the Yugoslav secret police. In 2009 he was controversially awarded the Silver Order of Merit by President Danilo Türk for his role in Operation North.
