= Peter Jančič =

Slovenian publicist

Peter Jančič is a Slovenian publicist, journalist, editor, political analyst and author. He has served as an editor-in-chief of daily Delo (2006-2007), Spletni časopis (2017-2020) and Siol news website (2020-).

Jančič graduated with a thesis on journalistic ethics and honor code at the Faculty of Social Sciences of the University of Ljubljana in 1991.

He published scholarly articles on journalistic ethics in Teorija in praksa journal, and was one of the key contributors in the development of the code of ethics for the Slovenian Journalists Association. The code still applies.

Before 2017, Peter Jančič was a journalist and domestic politics editor at daily newspaper Večer for 15 years, and at daily Delo for 10 years. In 2006 and 2007, he was the editor-in-chief of Delo. He wrote that when he served as the editor in chielf of Delo, "the newspaper sold more copies every day than Delo, Dnevnik and Večer combined sell today." In 2017, he was fired from Delo when he disagreed with what he called Delo's "political propaganda".

In 2017, Jančič published a book titled Fake News (Lažne novice). The book describes relations between Slovenian politics and media, who controls and influences the media and why they report the way they do. The book triggered a fierce debate among public figures.

For several years he served as a member of Council and the Program Council of the Radio-Television of Slovenia. Jančič was one of the founders and the first president of the Association of Journalists and Publicists, which is one of the two major associations of journalists in Slovenia.

In 2017, he founded the Freedom of Expression Foundation and the political website Online Newspaper (Spletni časopis) which he created and edited until 2020.

In April 2020, he became the editor-in-chief of Siol, one of the leading Slovenian news websites, and suspended to work for the Online Newspaper.
