= Ivan Bizjak =

Slovenian mathematician and politician (1956–2023)

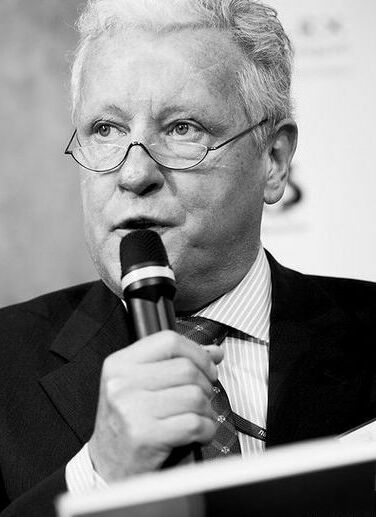
- Bizjak in 2011

Minister of Justice
- In office 30 November 2000 – 20 April 2004
- Prime Minister: Janez Drnovšek; Anton Rop
- Preceded by: Barbara Brezigar
- Succeeded by: Zdenka Cerar

Minister of the Interior
- In office 25 January 1993 – 8 June 1994
- Prime Minister: Janez Drnovšek
- Preceded by: Igor Bavčar
- Succeeded by: Andrej Šter

Personal details
- Born: 6 January 1956 Kranj, PR Slovenia, FDR Yugoslavia
- Died: 6 May 2023 (aged 67)
- Party: SKD
- Education: University of Ljubljana
- Occupation: Mathematician

Ivan Bizjak (6 January 1956 – 6 May 2023) was a Slovenian mathematician and politician. A member of the Slovene Christian Democrats, he served as Minister of the Interior from 1993 to 1994 and Minister of Justice from 2000 to 2004.

Bizjak died on 6 May 2023, at the age of 67.
