= Radovan Jančić =

Serbian politician (born 1958)

Radovan Jančić (Serbian Cyrillic: Радован Јанчић; born February 3, 1958) is a politician in Serbia. He has served in the National Assembly of Serbia since 2016 as a member of the Serbian Progressive Party.

== Early life and career ==
Jančić was born in Srpski Krstur in Vojvodina, then part of the People's Republic of Serbia in the Federal People's Republic of Yugoslavia. He is a civil engineering technician in private life.

== Member of the National Assembly ==
Jančić sought election to the Assembly of Vojvodina in the 2008 provincial election as a candidate of the Serbian Radical Party in the Novi Kneževac division. He was defeated in the second round of voting by Jovanka Petrović, a candidate endorsed by the Democratic Party. The Radical Party split later in 2008, and Jančić joined the breakaway Progressive Party.

Jančić received the seventy-sixth position on the Progressive Party's Aleksandar Vučić – Serbia Is Winning electoral list in the 2016 Serbian parliamentary election and was elected to the assembly when the list won a landslide victory with 131 out of 250 mandates. He is currently of member of the parliamentary committee on agriculture, forestry, and water management; a deputy member of two other committees; and a member of the parliamentary friendship groups for Austria, Belarus, France, Georgia, Israel, Kazakhstan, Russia, and Switzerland. He is also active in municipal politics in Novi Kneževac and was re-elected to the municipal assembly in the 2016 Serbian local elections.

== Electoral record ==
=== Provincial (Vojvodina) ===
2008 Vojvodina assembly election Novi Kneževac (constituency seat) - First and Second Rounds
Jovanka Petrović	For a European Vojvodina: Democratic Party–G17 Plus, Boris Tadić	1,287	20.41	2,850	66.98
Radovan Jančić	Serbian Radical Party	1,095	17.37	1,405	33.02
Nándor Újhelyi	Hungarian Coalition–István Pásztor	1,027	16.29		
Željko Grubačić	Democratic Party of Serbia	975	15.46		
Sava Grujić	Socialist Party of Serbia–Party of United Pensioners of Serbia	580	9.20		
Endre Fehér	Coalition: Together for Vojvodina - Nenad Čanak	459	7.28		
Miloš Teofanov	Citizens' Group: For Our Homeland - Miloš Teofanov	447	7.09		
Dragan Lancoš	New Serbia	435	6.90		
Total valid votes		6,305	100	4,255	100
Invalid ballots		290		129	
Total votes casts		6,595	65.30	4,384	43.41
