= National Democratic Party (Slovenia) =

The National Democratic Party (Slovene: Narodno demokratska stranka) or NDS was a short lived Slovenian conservative political party, established with the split within the Slovenian Democratic Union in 1991.

In October 1991, the majority within the Slovenian Democratic Union decided to change the name of the party to Slovenian Democratic Union - National Democrats and adopted a conservative platform for the coming elections. As a result, the left liberal faction, led by the party chairman Dimitrij Rupel left the party and founded the Democratic Party (they later joined the Liberal Democracy of Slovenia).

In the elections of April 1992, the Democratic Party gained 5,01% of the popular vote and 6 MPs, while the National Democrats only 2,2% of the vote and no seat in Parliament. As a result, the party merged with the Slovene Christian Democrats, where they established a special faction within the party. In 1995, most of them left the Christian Democrats and joined the Social Democratic Party of Slovenia (now known as the Slovenian Democratic Party).

== Prominent members ==
- Rajko Pirnat
- Andrej Šter
