= Peter Jambrek =

Slovenian intellectual

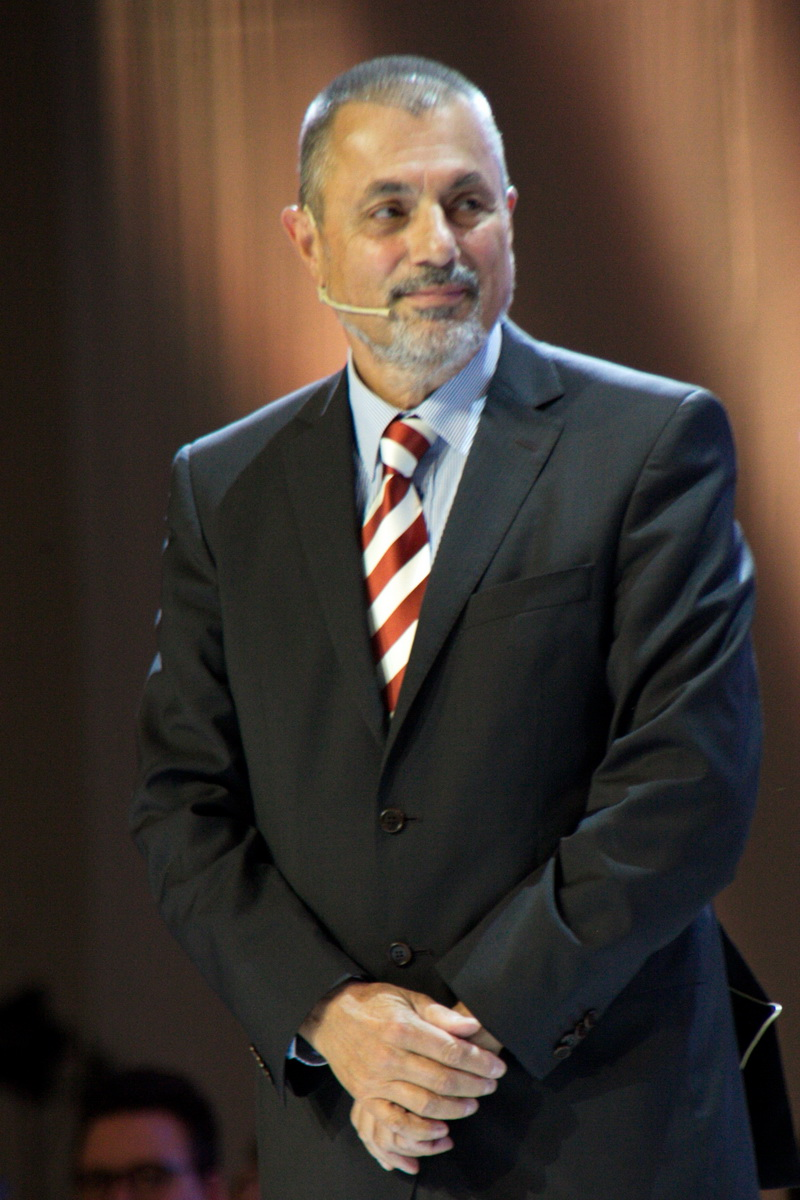
Peter Jambrek (1940), in an Esquerra Republicana de Catalunya meeting supporting Catalonia's referendum. Barcelona, March 4, 2017

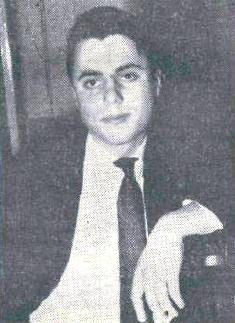
Peter Jambrek in 1962

Peter Jambrek (born 14 January 1940) is a Slovenian sociologist, jurist, politician and intellectual. He is considered among the fathers of the current Slovenian Constitution, and the most influential public intellectuals in Slovenia.

== Life ==
He was born in Ljubljana, then part of Yugoslavia, and attended high school in Maribor and in Ljubljana. He studied law at the University of Ljubljana, graduating in 1962. In his student years, he was active in student organizations and was among the editors of the student journal Tribuna. He obtained his MA in sociology in 1966, and joined the Communist Party of Slovenia the same year. Between 1968 and 1971, he studied sociology at the University of Chicago, obtaining his PhD in 1971.

== Academic and political career ==
In the early 1970s, Jambrek was close to the reformist wing of the Slovenian Communist Party, led by Stane Kavčič and Ernest Petrič. After the authoritarian turn in the Yugoslav Communist Party in 1972-73, which also affected Slovenia, Jambrek withdrew to purely academic work. He obtained professorship at the Faculty of Law and at the Faculty of Social Sciences of the University of Ljubljana. He studied conflict theory and published a sociological study on rituals and rebellions. Between 1973 and 1975, he taught at the University of Zambia in Lusaka. In 1975, he published a comparative study on the transformation of tribal societies into nation states. Between 1975 and 1982, he published several books analyzing the structure of political decisions in Yugoslav local government.

In the 1980s, Jambrek started collaborating with dissident intellectuals around the journal Nova revija. He rose to prominence in 1987, when he published a thorough legal study on the possibilities of Slovenian secession from Yugoslavia in the collective volume Contributions for a Slovenian National Program.

In 1989, he left the Communist Party and became a founding member of the Slovenian Democratic Union, one of the first democratic non-Communist parties organized during the Slovenian Spring, 1988-1990. After the victory of the anti-Communist DEMOS coalition in the first Slovenian free elections in spring 1990, he was appointed member of the Slovenian Constitutional Court. In the years 1990-1991, he became one of the foremost members of the Constitutional Committee that wrote the new Slovenian Constitution.

In 1993, he was appointed a member of the European Court for Human Rights in Strasbourg. Between June and November 2000, he served as Minister of the Interior in the short-lived centre right government of Andrej Bajuk. In 2004, he was among the co-founders of the liberal conservative platform Rally for the Republic, and served as its chairman until 2008.

Peter Jambrek was the editor at the European Public Hearing on "Crimes Committed by Totalitarian Regimes" organised by Slovenian Presidency of the Council of the European Union (January–June 2008) and the European Commission.

Despite never being its member, he was supportive of the Slovenian Democratic Party until October 2011, when he voiced his sympathy for the newly established liberal centrist Gregor Virant's Civic List.

At the presidential election in 2022 he voiced his support to Lacanian psychoanalyst and philosopher Nina Krajnik. Krajnik stated that Jambrek opened her eyes to presidential candidacy.

== End of political participation ==
Jambrek had a fallout with the Slovenian Democratic Party (SDS) in 2011. After voicing his support for the Civic List, he was accused of being an agent of the Yugoslav secret police, In an interview published by Planet Siol.net, Jambrek characterized the SDS as a party of "humiliated and insulted class, who never had privileges and who are frustrated because of that" He is not involved in politics anymore.

Political offices
Preceded by Borut Šuklje	Minister of the Interior; June 7, 2000–November 30, 2000	Succeeded by Rado Bohinc
