= Jelko Kacin =

Slovenian politician (1955)

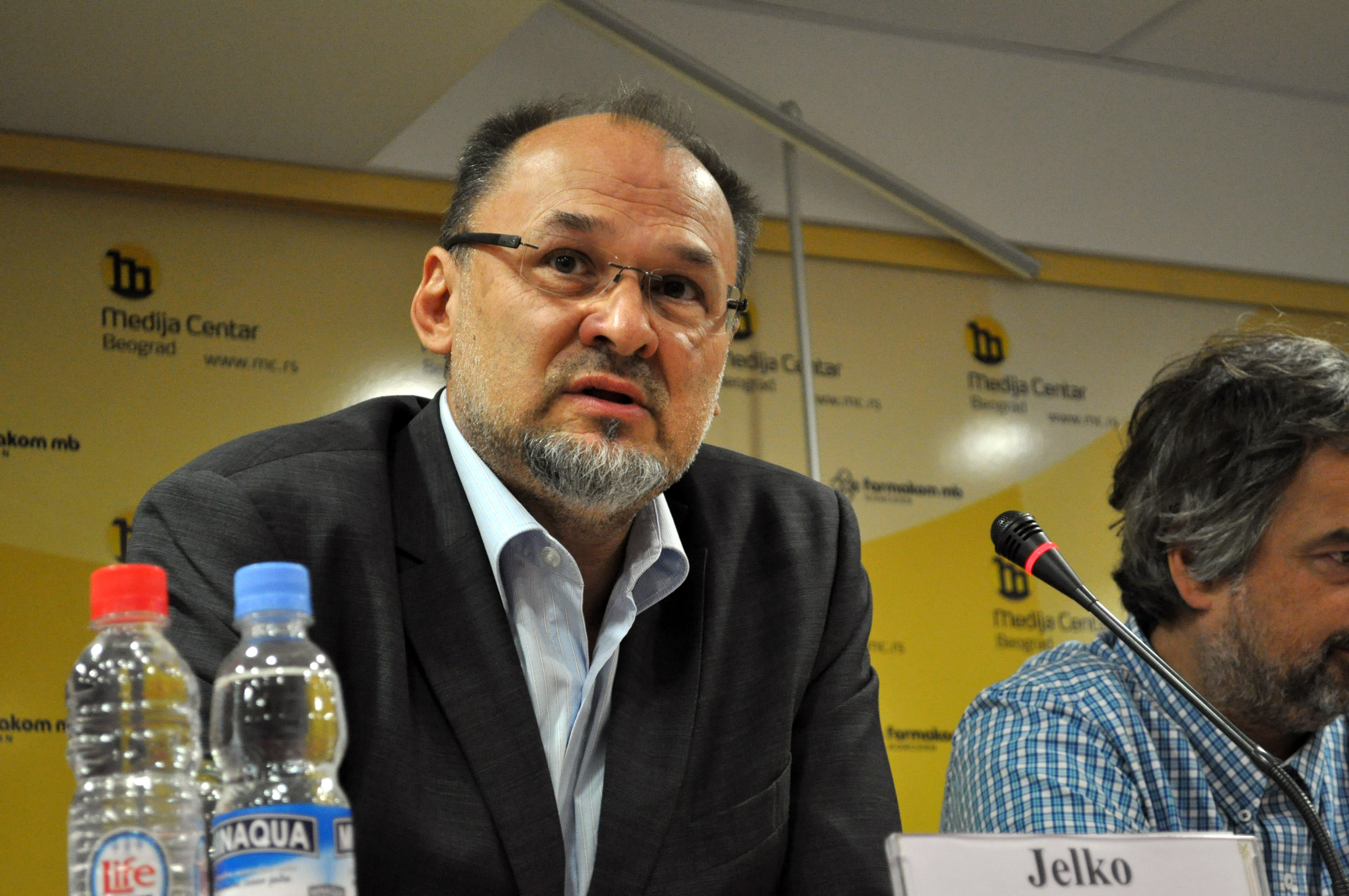
Jelko Kacin (2011)

Jelko Kacin (born 26 November 1955) is a Slovenian politician.

== Biography ==
During the Slovenian Independence War, he was the Secretary of Information of Slovenia. He founded the Slovenian Press Agency on 3 June 1991 and the war (also called the Ten-Day War) started on 27 June 1991. He is the former president of the Liberal Democracy of Slovenia and member of the bureau of the Alliance of Liberals and Democrats for Europe, who sat on the European Parliament's Committee on Foreign Affairs.

A former Member of the European Parliament, Kacin was also a substitute for the Committee on Transport and Tourism, vice-chair of the delegation to the EU–Moldova Parliamentary Cooperation Committee, a substitute for the delegation to the former Yugoslav Republic of Macedonia–EU Joint Parliamentary Committee, and for the delegations for relations with Iran, the Korean Peninsula, and the countries of south-east Europe.

== Career ==
- 1980: Defence studies graduate, University of Ljubljana
- 1980: Trainee in the Municipality of Kranj
- 1981: Adviser on defence preparations in the Municipality of Kranj
- 1984: Adviser on defence training in the Municipality of Kranj
- 1988: Head of the municipal civil protection unit
- 1990: Deputy Republican Defence Secretary
- 1991: Republican Secretary/Minister for Information
- 1993: Defence Minister
- 1993: Marketing division, Adria Karavan, Novo mesto
- 1996: Member of the LDS council
- 1996: Chairman of the Foreign Relations Committee
- 1996: Member of the Defence Committee and the Constitutional Commission
- 2000: Member of the Slovenian delegation to the Parliamentary Assembly of the Council of Europe
- 2000: Member of the EU-Slovenia Joint Parliamentary Committee
- 2000: Head of the national delegation to the IPU
- 2000: Member of the National Assembly of Slovenia
- 2000: Chairman of the Foreign Policy Committee
- 2000: Member of the Defence Committee and the European Affairs Commission
- 2002: Member of Kranj Municipal Council (1998)
- 2003: Observer in the European Parliament
- 2003: Member of the Convention on the Future of Europe
- 2003: Chairman of the LDS regional committee for Gorenjska
- 2003: Chairman of the Kranj committee of the LDS
- 2004: Member of the ALDE Bureau
- 2005: President of LDS

Political offices
Preceded by Stane Stanič	Secretary of Information; 24 April 1991–25 January 1993	Succeeded by Office abolished
Preceded by Janez Janša	Minister of Defence; 24 March 1994–27 February 1997	Succeeded by Tit Turnšek
Party political offices
Preceded by Anton Rop	President of the LDS; 15 October 2005–30 June 2007	Succeeded by Katarina Kresal
