= Delo (newspaper) =

Daily newspaper in Slovenia

- Type: Daily newspaper
- Format: Broadsheet
- Owner: FMR d.d.
- Publisher: Delo d.o.o.
- Editor: Bojan Budja
- Founded: 1959
- Political alignment: Historically: Left-wing, Social democracy Contemporary: Social liberalism
- Headquarters: Dunajska 5, Ljubljana, Slovenia
- Circulation: 12,800 (2025)
- Sister newspapers: Slovenske novice
- ISSN: 0350-7521
- Website: www.delo.si

Delo (lit. 'Labour') is a national daily newspaper in Slovenia. It covers politics, economics, sports, culture and social events in Slovene. In addition to Slovenia, the paper is available in several Croatian cities and in Belgrade, Serbia. It is based in Ljubljana.

== History ==
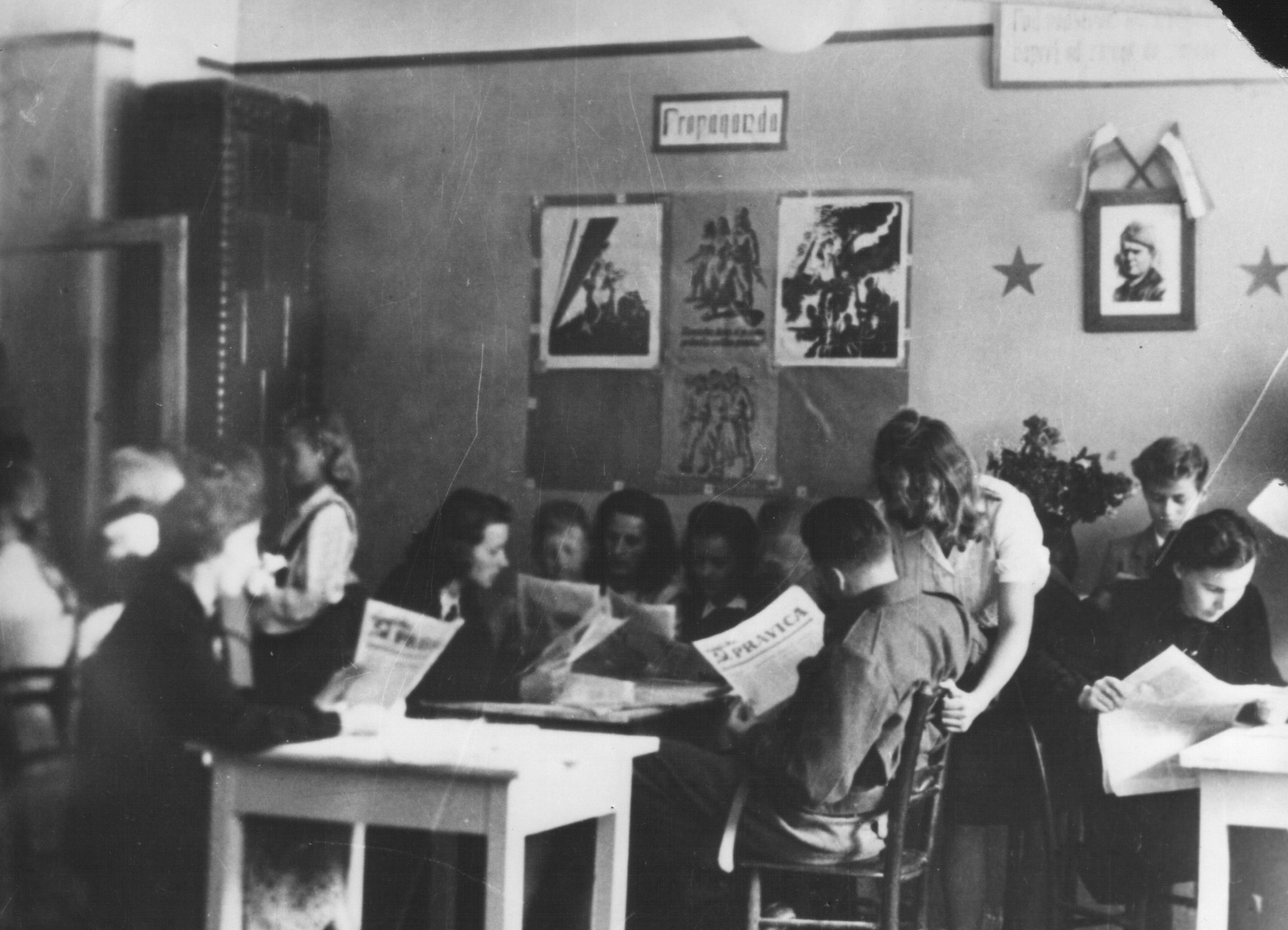
People reading Ljudska pravica (Metlika, 1944)

Delo was first published on 1 May 1959 when the newspapers Ljudska pravica ("The People's Right"), which was published since 1934, and Slovenski poročevalec ("The Slovene Reporter"), established in 1938, both the newspapers of the Communist Party of Slovenia, merged.

Among the chief editors were Dušan Benko, Darijan Košir, Peter Jančič, and Uroš Urbas.

== Profile ==
Delo is published in broadsheet format by media house Delo which also owns newspaper Slovenske novice. It offers content in print and also on web, mobile and tablet platforms. It publishes a mixture of different media, such as the tabloid Slovenske novice, bimonthly cultural newspaper Pogledi and various supplements.

Delo published seven regional editions until 2008 and since then it has published only one national edition.

== Circulation ==
The circulation of Delo was 90,000 copies in 2003. Its 2007 circulation was 77,000 copies, making it the second most read daily in the country. It was 46,726 copies in the period of July–September 2011.

== Supplements ==
Delo has the following supplements:

- Ona ("She"), women's supplement (Tuesdays)
- Delo in dom ("Work and Home"), about housekeeping (Wednesdays, every 14 days)
- Polet ("Flight" or "Enthusiasm/Drive"), about recreation and free time (every second Thursday of the month)
- Vikend ("Weekend"), TV guide with additional entertainment news (Fridays)
- Svet kapitala ("World of capital"), about finances, business, economy (Fridays)
- Sobotna priloga ("The Saturday Supplement"), a weekly supplement with commentaries, analysis and features on current events (Saturdays)
- Odprta kuhinja ("Open Kitchen"), Food guide (Sundays)
- Super 50, monthly supplement for people over 50, (every first Monday of the month)

Delo publishes a special Sunday edition, Nedelo (literally, 'idleness' or 'non-work'; Nedelo is a play on words since Nedelja is Slovene for 'Sunday'), in a smaller and bound (stapled) format.

Delo has published The New York Times International Weekly on Fridays since 2009. This eight-page supplement covers English-language articles from The New York Times.

== Digital platforms ==
Delo publishes its content on its website www.delo.si, on mobile platform, on iPad and on android.

According to the monthly metric of website visits, MOSS, the website of the paper was the 17th most visited web page (out of the 107 measured) in Slovenia in May 2012.

Media house Delo also has the following websites:

- www.Slovenskenovice.si
- www.Onaplus.si
- www.Svetkapitala.si
- www.Polet.si
- www.Deloindom.si
- www.Mična.si
- www.Odprtakuhinja.si
- Gostilne.delo.si
- Smucisca.delo.si
- www.Vandraj.si
