= DEMOS (Slovenia) =

Slovenian coalition of political parties

Democratic Opposition of Slovenia, also known as DEMOS (in Slovenian: Demokratična opozicija Slovenije), was a coalition of centre-right political parties created by an agreement between the Slovenian Democratic Union, the Social Democrat Alliance of Slovenia, the Slovene Christian Democrats, the Farmers' Alliance, and the Greens of Slovenia. All these parties emerged in late 1989, when the communist government permitted multiparty political life in Slovenia.

The leader of the coalition was the well-known dissident Jože Pučnik.

In the first democratic elections in April 1990, DEMOS won 54% of the votes and formed the first multiparty government of the country, headed by the Christian Democrat Lojze Peterle. The coalition led the process of democratization of the country, the liberalization of public life, and the implementation of a market economy. The most important achievement of the coalition, however, was the declaration of Slovenia's independence on 25 June 1991, followed by the Ten-Day War, in which the Slovenians rejected Yugoslav military interference.

As a result of internal disagreements, the coalition fell apart in 1992. It was officially dissolved in April 1992 in agreement with all the parties that had composed it. Following the collapse of Lojze Peterle's government, a new coalition government led by Janez Drnovšek was formed, which included several parties of the former DEMOS. Jože Pučnik became vice-president in Drnovšek's cabinet, guaranteeing some continuity in government policies.

== See also ==
- Contributions to the Slovenian National Program
- JBTZ-trial
- Revolutions of 1989
- Breakup of Yugoslavia
- History of Slovenia
- List of political parties in Slovenia
