= Sodobnost =

Slovenian literary and cultural magazine

- Categories: Literary and cultural magazine
- First issue: 1933; 92 years ago
- Country: Slovenia
- Language: Slovene
- Website: Home page

Sodobnost (Slovene: Modernity or Contemporary Time) is a Slovenian literary and cultural magazine, established in 1933. It is considered the oldest of currently existing literary magazines in Slovenia. Although Sodobnost has traditionally been a magazine focused on cultural and literary issues, it nowadays covers a wide range of current affairs. It is part of the Eurozine editorial project.

== History and profile ==
Sodobnost was established in 1933 by a group of left liberal intellectuals around Fran Albrecht, Josip Vidmar and Ferdo Kozak, who had left the national liberal magazine Ljubljanski zvon in disagreement with its appeasing policies towards the dictatorship of King Alexander I of Yugoslavia and the centralist and non-democratic policies of the Yugoslav National Party. Its first two editors were the literary critic Josip Vidmar and author Ferdo Kozak. After 1935 the magazine became one of the strongest supporters of the creation of a Slovenian Popular Front, that is of a broad coalition of left wing groups that would fight against the threat of Fascism and for Slovenian autonomy within Yugoslavia. In a period when the Communist party was outlawed in the Kingdom of Yugoslavia, the magazine enabled many prominent Communists to publish articles under pseudonyms; among them were Edvard Kardelj, Boris Kidrič, and Ivo Brnčič. In the artistic and literary sense, Sodobnost became the main platform for neo-realist and social realist authors, such as Prežihov Voranc, Ciril Kosmač, Miško Kranjec, Ivan Potrč, Ludvik Mrzel and others.

Following the Axis invasion of Yugoslavia in April 1941 the magazine closed down. After World War II the magazine was re-established as Novi svet ("New World"), which changed its name to Naša sodbonost ("Our Contemporary Time") in 1952, thus re-establishing the tradition with the interwar journal. Between 1946 and 1955, it mostly served as a means of cultural propaganda of the new Communist regime. During this time, it was edited by Boris Ziherl, the main cultural ideologist of the Communist Party of Slovenia. In 1955, Ziherl was replaced by a more pragmatic editorial board, and in 1963 it assumed its original name, Sodobnost. The following year, the literary historian and philosopher Dušan Pirjevec joined the editorial board, raising the overall intellectual level of the magazine. During this period, the contributors and editors of Sodobnost engaged in a long and sharp polemic with the alternative magazine Perspektive (edited by Taras Kermauner, Janko Kos, Dominik Smole and Dane Zajc), which assumed a more critical stand towards the Titoist regime. When the Perspektive were dissolved by the regime in 1964, the editors of Sodobnost published a solidarity note, and were replaced by the regime, as well.

After a period of crisis in 1964-1965, the new editorial board (headed by the poet Ciril Zlobec) shifted the attitude of the magazine to moderate and pragmatic positions, which opened the magazine to all quality contributors who were not openly and militantly against the prevailing policies in Yugoslavia and Slovenia. Between the mid 1960s and early 1980s, Sodobnost enjoyed the status of the most prestigious magazine in Slovenia; after that, it went into a gradual but continuous decline. In the late 1990s, under the editor Evald Flisar it became more influential again.

== Notable contributors ==
Many notable authors, critics and journalists have contributed to Sodobnost. Those include, besides the already mentioned, essayists Jože Javoršek and Primož Kozak, historians Bogo Grafenauer and Igor Grdina, author and sociologist Igor Škamperle, sociologist and politician Lev Kreft, poets Igo Gruden, Edvard Kocbek, Janez Menart, Miodrag Bulatović, Josip Osti, Iztok Osojnik and Niko Grafenauer, critic Bojan Štih, writers Prežihov Voranc, Igor Torkar, Lojze Kovačič, Dušan Šarotar and many others. The work of Egyptian novelist Naguib Mahfouz was also published in the magazine.

== See also ==
- List of magazines in Slovenia

== References and sources ==
- Aleš Berger and Ženja Leiler, eds., Slovenska kultura v XX. stoletju (Ljubljana: Cankarjeva založba, 2003), 150-151.
- Aleš Gabrič, Socialistična kulturna revolucija (Ljubljana: Cankarjeva založba, 1995).
