= Igo Gruden =

Slovene poet and translator

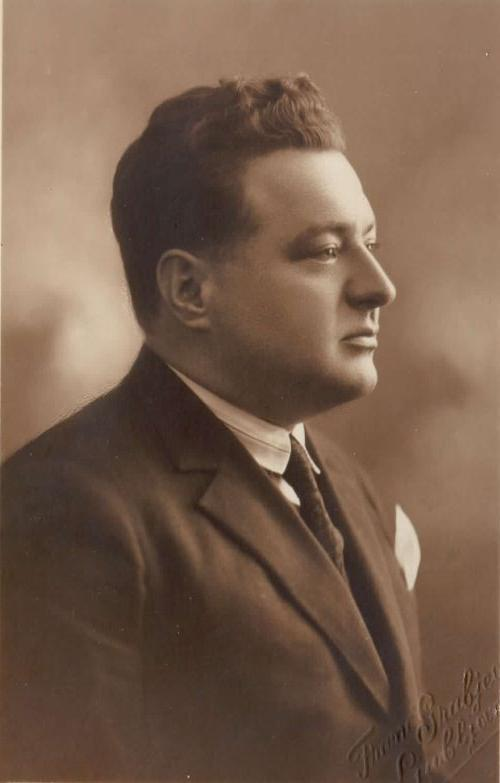
Igo Gruden in 1928

Igo Gruden (18 April 1893 – 29 November 1948) was a Slovene poet and translator.

He was born as Ignacij Gruden in the small fishing village of Aurisina near Trieste, then part of the Austro-Hungarian County of Gorizia and Gradisca (now in Italy) as first of ten children of Franc Gruden and Justina Košuta. He attended high schools in Trieste and Gorizia, and then studied law in Vienna and Graz. During World War I, he served in the Austro-Hungarian Army and fought in the Battles of the Isonzo, where he was seriously injured. After the war, he continued his studies in Prague, graduating in 1921. The same year, he moved to Ljubljana, then part of the Kingdom of Serbs, Croats and Slovenes, where he practiced law.

In the 1920s and 1930s, he was active in spreading the anti-Fascist sentiment among Slovene intellectuals. In 1922, he was arrested by the Italian authorities while visiting his native village, which was then under Italian jurisdiction. He was released after the intervention of the Yugoslav authorities. In Ljubljana, Gruden soon became part of the local left liberal intellectual circles. He collaborated with renowned journals such as Ljubljanski zvon and Sodobnost, and frequented authors such as Josip Vidmar, Juš Kozak, Ferdo Kozak, Fran Albreht, Stanko Leben, Lojze Ude and Anton Vodnik.

During World War II, he collaborated with the Liberation Front of the Slovene Nation, and was interned by the Italian occupation forces to the Rab concentration camp. After the Italian armistice, he joined the Partisan resistance. After the war, he worked at the Slovenian section of the Yugoslav Radio in Belgrade, together with Matej Bor and Anton Ingolič. He died in Ljubljana and was buried in the Žale cemetery.

Gruden's poetry was influenced mostly by the Slovene Modern (Slovene: slovenska moderna), particularly Oton Župančič and Dragotin Kette. He was also heavily influenced by Gabriele D'Annunzio and Bjørnstjerne Bjørnson. Initially, he followed the vitalist trend, but later moved to more reflexive poetry. During World War II, he published many poems describing the daily life in concentration camps.

== See also ==
- Slovene literature
