= List of Slovenian literary historians and critics =

This is a list of Slovenian literary historians and critics.

- Matija Čop (1797–1835)
- Anton Janežič (1828–1869)
- Fran Levstik (1831–1887)
- Matija Murko (1861–1952)
- Ivan Grafenauer (1880–1964)
- Izidor Cankar (1886–1958)
- Avgust Pirjevec (1887–1944)
- Josip Vidmar (1895–1992)
- Anton Vodnik (1901–1965)
- Ivo Brnčič (1912–1943)
- Dušan Pirjevec Ahac (1921–1977)
- Bojan Štih (1923–1982)
- Taras Kermauner (1930–2008)
- Janko Kos (b. 1931)
- Jože Pogačnik (1933–2002)
- Lojzka Bratuž (1934–2019)
- Rastko Močnik (b. 1944)
- Miran Hladnik (b. 1954)
- Aleš Debeljak (1961–2016)
- Simona Škrabec (b. 1968)
