= Sveta Trojica, Domžale =

Sveta Trojica Vrh Svete Trojice (until 1952), Trojica (1955–1992)
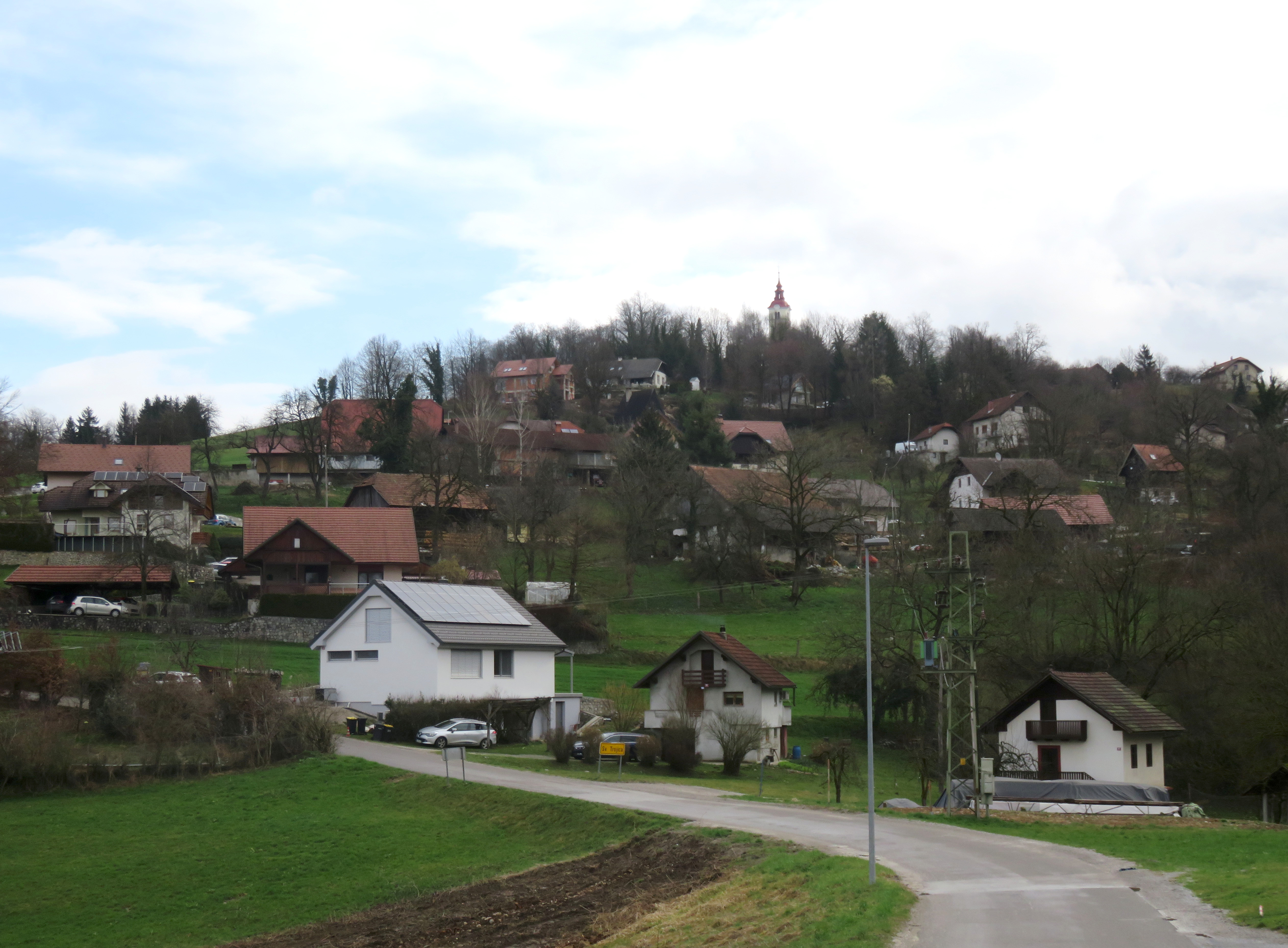

- Location in Slovenia
- Coordinates: 46°7′25.65″N 14°40′24.25″E
- Country: Slovenia
- Traditional region: Upper Carniola
- Statistical region: Central Slovenia
- Municipality: Domžale

Area
  - Total: 1.78 km^{2} (0.69 sq mi)
- Elevation: 482.2 m (1,582 ft)

Population (2020)
  - Total: 167
  - Density: 93.8/km^{2} (243/sq mi)

Sveta Trojica (pronounced [ˈsʋeːta tɾɔˈjiːtsa]; German: Heiligendreifaltigkeit) is a settlement in the hills east of Domžale, in the Upper Carniola region of Slovenia. It includes the hamlets of Konfin and Uševk (in older sources also Olševek, German: Uscheuk).

== Name ==
The name of the settlement was changed from Vrh Svete Trojice (literally, 'Holy Trinity Peak') to Sveta Trojica (literally, 'Holy Trinity') in 1952. The name was changed again to Trojica (literally, 'Trinity') in 1955. The name was changed on the basis of the 1948 Law on Names of Settlements and Designations of Squares, Streets, and Buildings as part of efforts by Slovenia's postwar communist government to remove religious elements from toponyms. The name Sveta Trojica was restored in 1992. In the past the German name was Heiligendreifaltigkeit.

== History ==
During the Second World War, the village and the surrounding area was used for convalescence by Partisan soldiers crossing the Sava River into Lower Carniola. Various Partisan units bivouacked in Sveta Trojica and Partisan meetings were held there. On 22 July 1944, Partisan forces repelled a German raid on the village. German troops burned the main settlement of Sveta Trojica, the hamlet of Uševk, and part of Konfin on 22 August 1944.

=== Liberator airplane crash ===
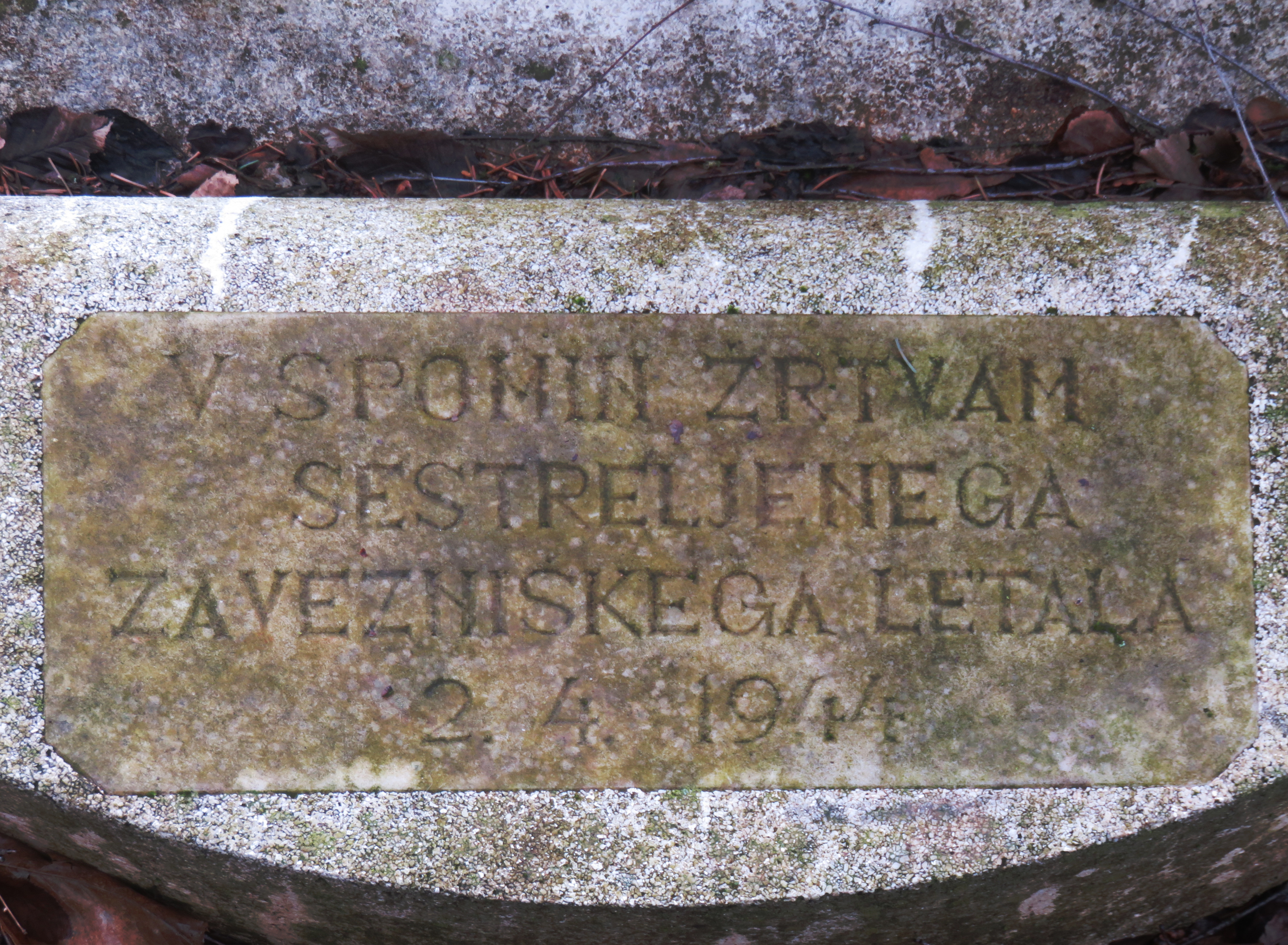
Plaque at the B-24 crash site

On 2 April 1944 at about 11 am, an American B-24 Liberator bomber crashed near the village after it was damaged by a German air raid on its return from the bombing of a ball-bearing plant at Steyr (Austria). All of the crew members were able to jump out of the plane. Five of them escaped and joined the Partisans, whereas the other five were captured by the Germans, but all of them survived and safely returned home. In 1994 a monument by the academy-trained sculptor Tone Demšar was unveiled in Sveta Trojica in memory of this event. The unveiling ceremony was attended by some of the still living crew members.

=== Clandestine grave ===
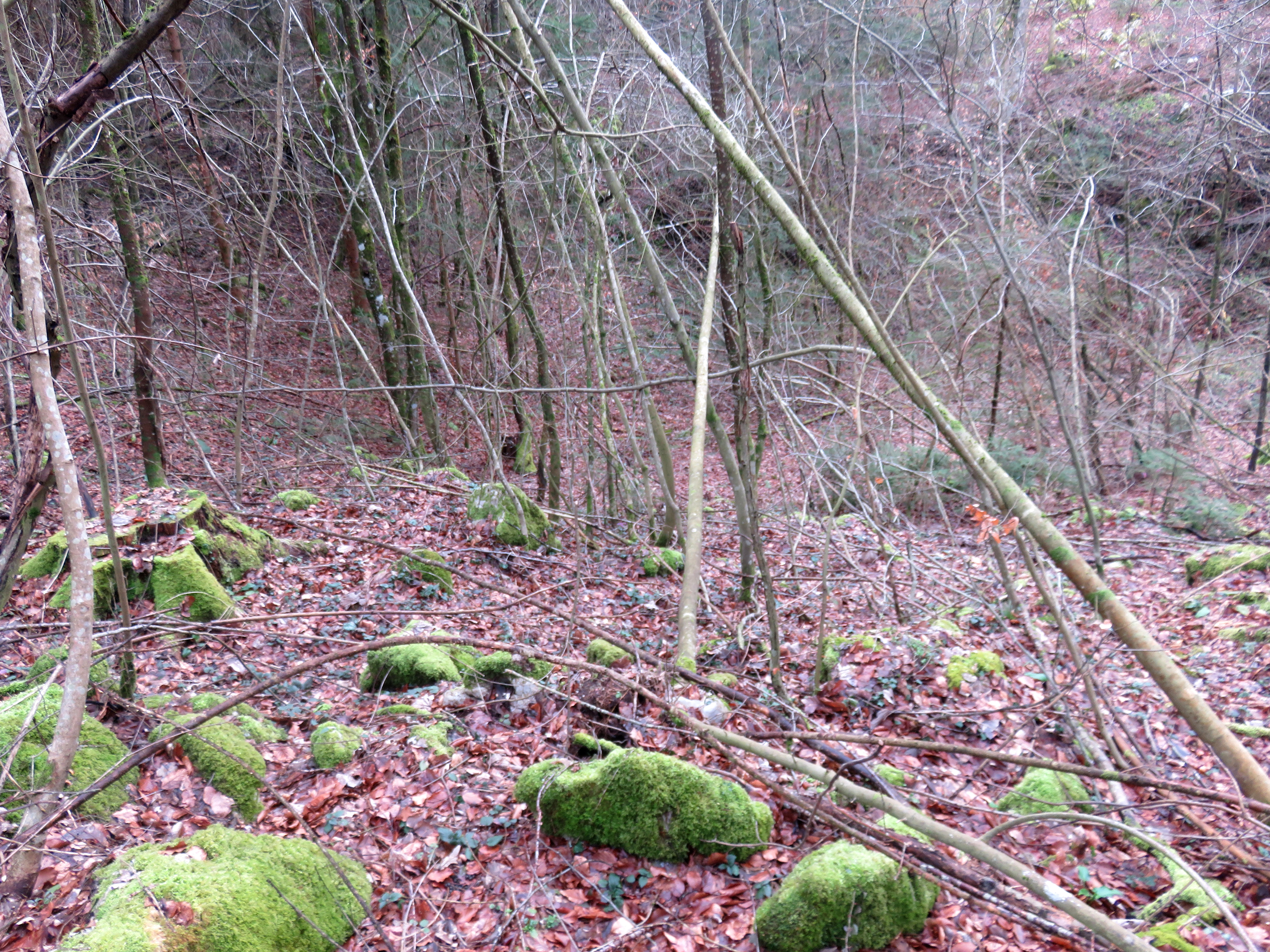
The Sever Shaft Grave

Sveta Trojica is the site of a clandestine grave from the Second World War. The Sever Shaft Grave (Slovene: Grobišče Severjevo brezno), also known as the Vastance Grave (Grobišče V Vastancah), is located about 1 kilometer (0.62 mi) east of Sveta Trojica, on the left side of a dirt road between house no. 11 and the Vovk farm in Zgornja Javoršica. During the war, the Partisans accused a civilian from Zajelše of betrayal, shot him, and hid the body in the shaft. After the war, the remains were removed and reburied.

== Landmarks ==
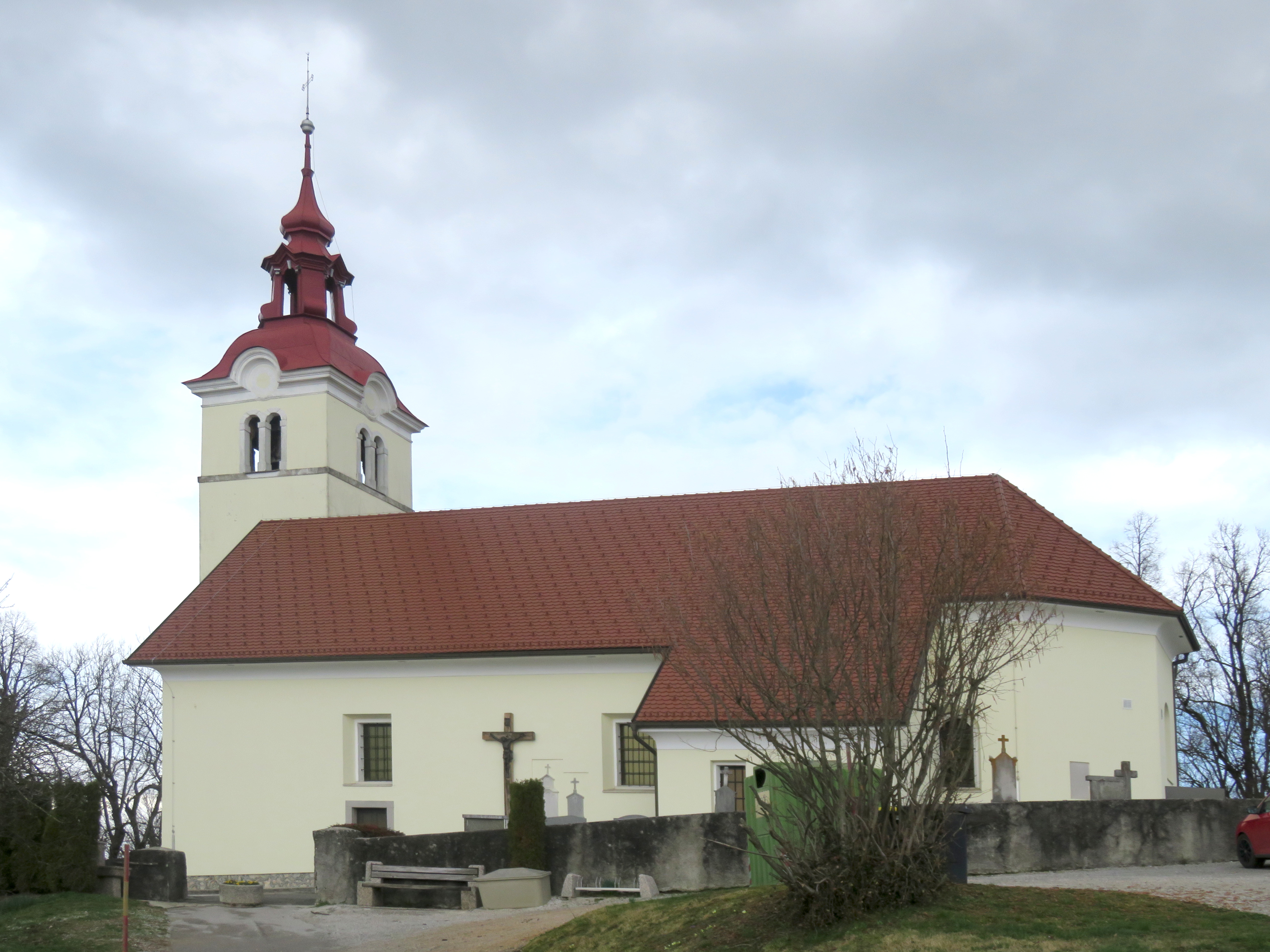
Holy Trinity Church

=== Castle ===
The partially preserved ruins of Koprivnik Castle (German: Rabensberg) are located in the hamlet of Konfin. The castle was abandoned in the 13th century, when the owners relocated to Krumperk Castle, and it was in ruins by the 17th century. In the second half of the 19th century, the castle became known as Old Castle (Slovene: Stari grad) or Freight Castle (Tovorov grad), named after the nearby freight route from the Central Sava Valley. In 1930 the ruins of the castle were purchased by Valentin Rožič.

=== Church ===
The local church, from which the settlement also gets its name, is dedicated to the Holy Trinity (Slovene: Sveta Trojica). The poet Dane Zajc is buried in the adjacent cemetery.

== Notable people ==
Notable people that were born or lived in Sveta Trojica include:

- Tone Demšar (1946–1997), sculptor
- Valentin Rožič (1878–1935), politician and journalist
- Velimir Vulikić (born 1931), stomatologist and writer
- Dane Zajc (1929–2005), poet and playwright
