= Peter Klepec bibliography =

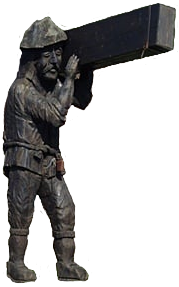
- Statue of Peter Klepec by Marijan Leš in Mali Lug
- Accounts↙: 20
- Folkloristics↙: 14
- Popular literature↙: 11
- Fiction↙: 9
- Audiovisual↙: 15
- Contemporary↙: 27

The Peter Klepec folkloric corpus dates back to the early 19th century, spanning three centuries, from the initial collection of Janez Zima, to early expansion by Matevž Ravnikar-Poženčan, Dragutin Hirc and a number of pseudonymous ethnographers, until the more systematic efforts of Jože Primc and others. The corpus has attracted a number of prominent folklorists, including Maja Bošković-Stulli, Monika Kropej Telban and Zmago Šmitek. Through fictional popularizations, Klepec grew from an obscure legend to a national myth, beginning with Ivan Cankar's Podobe iz sanj in 1917, but even more prominently in children's literature from 1956 on thanks to France Bevk. An extensive bibliography was published in Moric and Perinić Lewis 2019, A more detailed bibliography focusing on Peter Klepec in magazines before WWI had been published by Marko Smole. Other, less complete bibliographies were published within older monographs.

== Folklore ==
=== Accounts ===
- Zima, Janez (n.d.) [written 1828]. Klepcz. Ljubljana. Narodna in univerzitetna knjižnica v Ljubljani, Prvi zbornik Korytkove ostaline, 181–186.
  - Zima, Janez. Od volkodlaka do Klepca: vsakovrstna praznoverna mnenja, šege ter pripovedi Ribničanov, Potočanov, Krašovcev in Osilničanov [From the Werewolf to Klepec: All Kinds of Superstitious Beliefs, Customs, and Tales of the People of Ribnica, Potoče, Karst, and Osilnica] (in Slovenian). Translated by Popit, Ilja. Rakovljica: Didakta. pp. 93–97. ISBN 978-961-261-184-2.

Peter Klepec, silni slovenski junak, the first publication to feature Petər Klepəc

- Sevčan, L. (1846-12-16) [continued 1846-12-23]. "Peter Klepec, silni slovenski junak" [Peter Klepec, the Mighty Slovenian Hero]. Kmetijske in rokodelske novice (in Slovenian). Vol. 4, no. 50. pp. 200, 204. ISSN 1318-9832. Online publication 2011-02-15.
- Ravnikar-Poženčan, Matevž [in Slovenian] (1847-05-26). "Še ena povest od Petra Klepca" [Another Tale of Peter Klepec]. Kmetijske in rokodelske novice (in Slovenian). Vol. 5, no. 21. p. 84. ISSN 1318-9832. Online publication 2009-09-24.
- Š., A. (1860). "Kratkočasnica: Peter Klepec (Narodna Pripovedka)" [Pastime: Peter Klepec (Folk Tale)]. Kmetijske in rokodelske novice (in Slovenian). Vol. 18, no. 31. pp. 244–245. ISSN 1318-9832.
- Vertec (1880-09-01). "Peter Klepec". Vertec: časopis s podobami za slovensko mladost. Vol. 10, no. 9. Ljubljana. ISSN 1854-0341. Online publication 2009-09-24.
- Hirc, Dragutin [in Croatian] (1892-09-02). "Crtice o kotaru čabarskome (nastavak)" [Sketches of the Čabar District (Continuation)]. Narodne novine (in Serbo-Croatian). Vol. 58, no. 200. pp. 4–5. ISSN 0027-7932.
- Hirc, Dragutin (1892-09-03). "Crtice o kotaru čabarskome (nastavak)" [Sketches of the Čabar District]. Narodne novine (in Serbo-Croatian). Vol. 58, no. 201. p. 4. ISSN 0027-7932.
- Hirc, Dragutin (1898) [written 1898-02-08]. "Petar Klepac". Gorski kotar: slike, opisi i putopisi. Illustrated by Václav Lev Anderle. Zagreb: 🖶 Lavoslav Hartman (Kugli i Deutsch). pp. 146–149. Republished as Hirc, Dragutin (1993) [written 1898-02-08]. "Petar Klepac". Gorski kotar: slike, opisi i putopisi [Gorski Kotar: Pictures, Descriptions, and Travelogues] (in Serbo-Croatian). Illustrated by Václav Lev Anderle. Rijeka: 🖶 Tiskara Rijeka. pp. 146–149. ISBN 953-158-004-9.
- Jemeršić, Ivan Nepomuk [in Croatian] (1904) [1904-01-01]. "Pogled na Mali lug, Smrečje i Klepčeva kuća" [A Look at Mali Lug, Smrečje, and Klepec's House]. Kopnom i morem na Plitvička jezera [By Land and Sea to the Plitvice Lakes] (in Serbo-Croatian). Zagreb. pp. 128–129.
- Bonifačić Rožin, Nikola (n.d.) [written 1953]. Hrvatske narodne pjesme, običaji i priče kotara Delnice [Croatian Folk Songs, Customs, and Stories of the Delnice District] (in Serbo-Croatian). Zagreb. Institut za etnologiju i folkloristiku, signature IEF rkp 141.
- Ožbolt, Anton (1974). Dežela Petra Klepca [The Land of Peter Klepec] (in Slovenian). Ljubljana: Ljubljana. Reviews have been written.
- Bošković-Stulli, Maja (1975). "Hrvatske i slovenske usmene predaje o krsniku – kresniku" [Croatian and Slovenian Oral Traditions about the Krsnik – Kresnik]. Usmena književnost kao umjetnost riječi [Oral Literature as the Art of Words] (in Serbo-Croatian). Zagreb: Mladost. pp. 205–227.
- Primc, Jože (1991). "Peter Klepec in njegova dežela" [Peter Klepec and His Land]. Rival: časopis za književnost (in Slovenian). 5 (1). Rijeka: Centar društvenih djelatnosti mladih Rijeka: 166–168. ISSN 0353-2968. Used by Majer, Katja (2008). "Osilnica". Svet Kolpe [The World of the Kolpa] (PDF) (in Slovenian). Delnice. pp. 16–17.
- Primc, Jože (1997). Okameneli mož in druge zgodbe iz Zgornje Kolpske doline (od Babnega Polja in Prezida prek Gerova, Čabra, Osilnice, Kužlja, Kostela, Fare do Dola in Predgrada) [The Petrified Man and Other Stories from the Upper Kolpa Valley (from Babno Polje and Prezid over Gerovo, Čabar, Osilnica, Kuželj, Kostel, Fara to Dol and Predgrad)] (in Slovenian). Ljubljana: Kmečki glas.
- Žagar, Anka [in Croatian] (2001). "Pitr Klepc na Svite Guore sedi". Kap damače reči [The Petrified Man and Other Stories from the Upper Kolpa Valley] (in kjv). Čabar: Ogranak Matice hrvatske u Čabru. p. 443.
- Pochobradsky, Zlatko (2001). Kap svaje reči [A Drop of One's Own Words] (in Croatian). Čabar: Poglavarstvo grada Čabra.
- Ožura, Jože (2002). "Peter Klepec" [The Valley of Osilnica]. Osilniška dolina (in Slovenian). 18 (7–8). Osilnica. ISSN 2350-4331.
- Makarovič, Marija, ed. (2002). Dva bregova eno srce: Življenjske pripovedi iz doline Kolpe in Čabranke [Two Banks, One Heart: Life Stories from the Kolpa and Čabranka Valleys] (in Slovenian). Kočevje: Pokrajinski muzej Kočevje. ISBN 961-90045-8-2.
- Malnar, Slavko (2004). Petar Klepac. Rijeka, Čabar: Ogranak Matice hrvatske u Čabru, Adamić. ISBN 9789532191882.
- Smole, Marko (n.d.) [written 2009-2011]. "Časopisne objave o Petru Klepcu, Plešcih in Sveti Gori v časopisih iz 19. stoletja in do druge svetovne vojne: Članek k razstavi v Etnološki zbirki Palčeva šiša, Plešce, 2009–2011" [Newspaper Publications on Peter Klepec, Plešce and Sveta Gora in 19th Century Newspapers to the Second World War: Article on the Exhibition in the Ethnological Collection Palčeva Šiša, Plešce, 2009–2011] (Document) (in Slovenian). Univerza v Ljubljani. A bibliography of Klepəc with a focus on newspapers.

=== Folkloristics ===
The legend as related by Dragutin Hirc in Crtice o kotaru čabarskome

- Perinić Lewis, Ana (July 2019). "Junaci, divovi i patuljci Gorskoga kotara" [Heroes, Giants, and Dwarfs of Gorski Kotar]. Međunarodna smotra folklora (PDF) (in Serbo-Croatian). Travno, Zagreb: Kulturni centar Travno, 🖶 InterGrafika-TTŽ. pp. 15–16. ISSN 2584-3788. Tirage: 400. Republished as Perinić Lewis, Ana (2022-12-13). Majetić, Goran (ed.). "Junaci, divovi i patuljci Gorskoga kotara". Budni div. Archived from the original on 2023-02-03.
- Moric, Anja; Perinić Lewis, Ana (2019). "Peter Klepec – silni slovensko-hrvaški junak?" [Peter Klepec – A Mighty Slovene-Croatian Hero?]. Močni, modri in dobri: O junakih slovenske folklore [Strong, Wise, and Good: On the Heroes of Slovenian Folklore]. Zupaničeva knjižnica (in Slovenian). Vol. 48. Ljubljana: Znanstvena založba Filozofske fakultete Univerze v Ljubljani, 🖶 Birografika Bori. pp. 109–140. ISBN 978-961-06-0262-0. Tirage: 300. Online publication 2019-11.
- Kropej Telban, Monika (2019). "Razvojna pot in percepcija izročil o Kralju Matjažu in Petru Klepcu" [The Developmental Path and Perception of Traditions about King Matjaž and Peter Klepec]. Močni, modri in dobri: O junakih slovenske folklore. Zupaničeva knjižnica (in Slovenian). Vol. 48. Ljubljana: Znanstvena založba Filozofske fakultete Univerze v Ljubljani, 🖶 Birografika Bori. pp. 35–60. ISBN 978-961-06-0262-0. Tirage: 300.
- Morić, Anja; Perinić Lewis, Ana (2018-06-12). "Petar Klepac/Peter Klepec/Pitr Kljepc: junak na granici i manifestacije njegove snage" [Petar Klepac/Peter Klepec/Pitr Kljepc: A Borderland Hero and the Manifestations of his Strength]. Narodna umjetnost: hrvatski časopis za etnologiju i folkloristiku. 55 (1): 135–158. eISSN 1848-865X.
- Šalamon, Anja (2017). Pregled dela z uporabniki s posebnimi potrebami v Valvasorjevi knjižnici Krško in odzivnost skozi leta (Thesis). Ljubljana: Filozofska fakulteta Univerze v Ljubljani (published 2018-01-04). hdl:20.500.12556/RUL-99177.
- Kropej Telban, Monika (2017-06-12). "Folk Hero Peter Klepec in the Melting Pot of Different Traditions". Traditiones. 46 (1–2): 11–36. doi:10.3986/Traditio2017460101. ISSN 0352-0447.
- Moric, Ana; Perinić Lewis, Ana (June 2016). Junak Petar Klepac i njegov zavičaj [Hero Petar Klepac and his homeland]. 3rd International Scientific Conference of Mediaeval Archaeology of the Institute of Archaeology "Sacralization of Landscape and Sacred Places".
- Moric, Ana; Perinić Lewis, Ana (2016). "Junak Petar Klepac i njegov zavičaj" [Hero Petar Klepac and his homeland]. Sakralizacija prostora i sveta mjesta: Knjiga sažetaka [Sacralization of Landscape and Sacred Places: Book of Abstracts] (PDF). Zagreb, Sveti Ivan Zelina: Institut za arheologiju, 🖶 Tiskara Zelina. pp. 51–52. ISBN 978-953-6064-29-8. Tirage: 100.
- Jarec, Morana; Perinić Lewis, Ana (2014). Planine snažnih divova, zločestih mužeka i veselih bertija. 13. hrvatsko-slovenske paralele: Srednjoeuropsko povezivanje etnologa i kulturnih antropologa kao izazov današnjem vremenu.
- Kropej Telban, Monika (2012). Supernatural Beings from Slovenian Myth and Folktales. ISBN 978-961-05-0338-5. Online publication 2013-03-22.
- Bošković-Stulli, Maja (2005). "Tragom krsnika i benandantea" [On the Trail of the Krsnik and Benandanti]. Od bugarštice do svakidašnjice [From Bugarštica to Everyday Life] (in Serbo-Croatian). Konzor. pp. 125–159. ISBN 953-224-040-3.
- Šmitek, Zmago [in Slovenian] (2005). Moč ti je dana: Slovenske pripovedi o junakih in zgodovinskih osebnostih [Power is Given to You: Slovenian Tales About Heroes and Historical Figures]. Zbirka Zakladnica slovenskih pripovedi (in Slovenian). Radovljica: Didakta. ISBN 9616530674.
- Bettelheim, Bruno (1999). Rabe čudežnega: o pomenu pravljic. Ljubljana: Studia humanitatis. ISBN 961-6262-22-X. Reviews have been written.
- Šmitek, Zmago (1998). Mitološko izročilo Slovencev: Svetinje preteklosti [Mythological Tradition of the Slovenes: Sacred Relics of the Past] (in Slovenian) (1st ed.). Ljubljana: Forma sedem. ISBN 961-6181-11-4. 2nd edition published as Šmitek, Zmago (2004). Mitološko izročilo Slovencev: Svetinje preteklosti (2nd ed.). ISBN 9616446894. 3rd edition published as Šmitek, Zmago (2011). Mitološko izročilo Slovencev: Svetinje preteklosti (3rd ed.). Ljubljana: Študentska založa. ISBN 9789616446891. 4th edition published as Šmitek, Zmago (2017). Mitološko izročilo Slovencev: Svetinje preteklosti. eBeletrina (4th ed.). Beletrina. ISBN 9789612843564. Online publication 2018-02-07. Reviews have been written.

== Popular literature ==
- Primc, Jože (1991-11-07). "Od Petra Klepca do Rimljanov" [From Peter Klepec to the Romans]. Dolenjski list (in Slovenian). p. 12. ISSN 0416-2242.
- Klepac, Dušan (1997). Iz šumarske povijesti Gorskoga kotara u sadašnjost [From Forestry History of Gorski Kotar to the Present] (in Serbo-Croatian). Zagreb: Hrvatske šume. ISBN 953-6253-12-7.
- Adamič, Margarita; Auguštin, Greta; Koščak, Marko; Lautar, Katja; Pezelj, Miha; Srkoč, Mirela; Stepinac Fabijanić, Tihomira; Surudžić, Miljana; Škrtić, Neven; Žurga, Sanda (2004). "V deželi metuljev in Petra Klepca" [In the Land of Butterflies and Peter Klepec]. Po Kolpi in Gorjancih: Turistična cona [Along the Kolpa and Gorjanci: Tourist Zone] (in Slovenian). pp. 7–8. ISBN 961-91327-0-X.
- Krmpotić, Marinko (December 2010). "Legenda o Petru Klepcu" [The Legend of Petar Klepac] (PDF). Zeleno i plavo: magazin primorsko-goranske županije (in Serbo-Croatian). Vol. 6, no. 23. Rijeka. p. 27. ISSN 1845-5220.
- Durini, Marko (2017-07-09). "Za rojstni dan iz Polja na otok Krk: Čez dva dni pa nazaj" [For a Birthday from Polje to the Island of Krk: And Back in Two Days] (in Slovenian). Archived from the original on 2017-09-23.
- Ured za Blaga i misterije (2018-09-09). "Goranski div Petar Klepac snagu je dobio od vila koje je na Svetoj gori jednom zaštitio od sunca, i postao simbol Čabra". Blaga i misterije. Archived from the original on 2019-06-07.
- Moric, Anja (2019-07-29). "Peter Klepec – mogočni junak doline Kolpe in Čabranke". Kočevski b(r)log: Gottscheer blog. Archived from the original on 2020-08-11. German translation: Moric, Anja (2019-07-29). "Peter Klepec – der mächtige Held des Kolpa- und Čabranka-Tals". Kočevski b(r)log: Gottscheer blog. Archived from the original on 2023-03-26. English translation: Moric, Anja (2019-07-29). "Peter Klepec – a mighty hero of the Kolpa and Čabranka Valley". Kočevski b(r)log: Gottscheer blog. Archived from the original on 2021-01-27.
- Cerić, Goran (2022-03-29). "Dobri div Petar Klepac iz Čabra". ABC Geografija. Archived from the original on 2022-03-29.

=== Fiction ===
Podobe iz Sanj, the first major treatment of Petər Klepəc in fiction

- Cankar, Ivan (1917). "Peter Klepec". Podobe iz sanj [Images from Dreams]. Nova knjižnica (in Slovenian). Vol. 1. Ljubljana: Nova založba, 🖶 Katoliška tiskarna. pp. 40–43. Online publication 2009-09-17.
  - Cankar, Ivan (2001-04-10). Luin, Franko (ed.). Podobe iz sanj. Tyresö: BESeDA, Omnibus. ISBN 91-7301-068-5. Archived from the original on 2001-07-02. 2nd edition published as Cankar, Ivan (2023-03-22) [published 2008-08-16]. "Peter Klepec". In Hladnik, Miran (ed.). Podobe iz sanj (in Slovenian) – via Wikisource.
- Kozak, Primož (1971). Peter Klepec v Ameriki [Peter Klepec in America] (in Slovenian).
- Pochobradsky, Zlatko (2020). Petar Klepac: povijesni roman [Petar Klepac: A Historical Novel] (in Croatian). Čabar: Ogranak Matice hrvatske u Čabru. ISBN 9789537541651. Reviews have been written.

=== Children's fiction ===
- Bevk, France (1956). Peter Klepec. Bevkovo izbrano mladinsko delo. Vol. 8. Illustrated by Karel Hrovatin (1st ed.). Ljubljana: Mladinska knjiga. Reviews have been written.
  - Bevk, France (1958). Peter Klepec. Knjižnica Čebelica. Vol. 36. Illustrated by Tone Kralj. Ljubljana: Mladinska knjiga. OCLC 444376550.
  - Bevk, France (1963). "Peter Klepec". Otroci samote [Children of Solitude] (in Slovenian). Illustrated by Maksim Gaspari (2nd ed.). Ljubljana: Mladinska knjiga. Serbo-Croatian translation: Bevk, France (1966). "Peter Klepec". Peter Klepec, Hajduk Saladin. Lastavica. Translated by Rakočević, Milan; Stošić, Josip. Sarajevo: Veselin Masleša.
  - Bevk, France (1978). Peter Klepec. Zbirka Velike slikalnice. Illustrated by Marjan Manček (? ed.). Ljubljana: Mladinska knjiga. 2nd edition published as Bevk, France (1988). Peter Klepec. Cicibanov vrtiljak. Illustrated by Marjan Manček (? ed.). Ljubljana: Mladinska knjiga. ISBN 8611013549. Tirage: 13,500. English translation published as Bevk, France (1988). Peter Klepec. Knjige za cicibane. Translated by Kunaver, Dušica. Illustrated by Marjan Manček. Ljubljana: Državna založba Slovenije. ISBN 86-341-0371-4. 3rd edition published as Bevk, France (2008). Peter Klepec. Zbirka Zakladi otroštva. Illustrated by Marjan Manček (? ed.). Ljubljana: Mladinska knjiga. ISBN 978-961-01-0695-1. Tirage: 6500. 4th edition published Bevk, France (2013). Peter Klepec. Illustrated by Marjan Manček (? ed.). Ljubljana: Mladinska knjiga. ISBN 9789610129165. Tirage: 7000.
    - Mihevc, Nataša, ed. (1993). Peter Klepec. Ljubljana: Zavod za slepo in slabovidno mladino. OCLC 1414697995. A braille transcription of the 1988 edition.
    - Bevk, France (2021). Peter Klepec. Ljubljana: Center IRIS. OCLC 1258319318. Tirage: 1. A braille transcription of the 1978 edition.
  - Bevk, France (2014-12-29). Kopljar, Marija (ed.). Peter Klepec (in Slovenian) – via Wikisource.
  - Bevk, France (2018). Peter Klepec. Zbirka BralaTipke. Illustrated by Sanka Bek, Ines Jaklin, Anja Zamuda. OCLC 1146285899. Tirage: 1.
  - Bevk, France (2020). Peter Klepec. Kobi čitanka (? ed.). Vrtojba: Hopalai. ISBN 9789619518601. Tirage: 100. Reprinted as Bevk, France (2021). Peter Klepec. Kobi čitanka (? ed.). Vrtojba: Hopalai. ISBN 9789619518601. Printed for dyslexic readers. A braille edition was also printed.
- Čater, Dušan (1995). Peter Klepec. Littera. ISBN 961-6171-04-6. Children's book.
- Janeš, Jasenka, ed. (2002). Petar Klepac: Radna slikovnica. Čabar: Osnovna škola "Petar Zrinski" Čabar, Ogranak Matice hrvatske u Čabru.
- Primc, Jože (April 2009). "Slovenska ljudska: Kako je Peter Klepec moč dobil" [Slovenian Folk Tale: How Peter Klepec Got His Power]. Ciciban: revija za najmlajše (in Slovenian). 8 (64): 24–25. ISSN 0350-8870.
- Kušec, Mladen (2015). Goranove priče [Goran's Stories] (in Serbo-Croatian). Illustrated by Niko Barun. Zagreb: Hrvatsko šumarsko društvo. ISBN 978-953-56470-7-2.
- Drvar, Magdalena (2025-06-23) [defended 2025-06-05]. Motivi Gorskog kotara u dječjoj književnosti [Motifs of Gorski Kotar in Children's Literature] (Thesis) (in Serbo-Croatian). Gospić: Sveučilište u Zadru.

=== Audiovisual ===
- Kozak, Ferdo (1949). Profesor Klepec: Komedija v štirih dejanjih [Professor Klepec: A Comedy in Four Parts] (in Slovenian). Ljubljana: Državna založba Slovenije. 2nd edition published as Kozak, Ferdo (1971). "Profesor Klepec: Komedija v štirih dejanjih". Izabrano delo: Ferdo Kozak (in Slovenian). Ljubljana: Mladinska knjiga. The script of a play first performed in 1940, temporarily renamed Profesor Klepec in 1951. Reviews have been written.
- Rožin Bonifačić, Nikola (n.d.) [written 1964]. Petar Klepac: Igra u 5 slika (prema narodnoj priči iz Gorskog kotara) [Petar Klepac: A Play in 5 Parts (According to the Folk Tale from Gorski Kotar)] (in Croatian). Odsjek za povijest hrvatskog kazališta HAZU, Muzejsko-kazališna zbirka, LT Kukolja 111. The script of a puppet play performed in 1964 at the Gradsko kazalište lutaka in rijeka. Reviews have been written.
- Gatnik, Kostja (1970). "Peter Klepec". Pavliha: list za pametne Slovence itd. Vol. 27. ISSN 0031-3289. A comic strip.
- Škerl, Danijel "Dane" [in Slovenian] (1980). Peter Klepec. Maribor. Slovenski glasbenoinformacijski center, ED. DSS 980*. Online publication 2023-07-12. A ballet.
- Lužan, Pavel [in Slovenian] (1994), Peter Klepec: radijska igra za otroke, Ljubljana: Radio Slovenija, OCLC 442404913 A puppet show script.
- Koni Steinbacher (director) (1998). Dekleva, Milan (ed.). Peter Klepec (Motion picture). Izola: Kost, TV Slovenija. An animated short film.
- Izgoršek, Žan, ed. (2002). Nepremagljiva kokošja junaka [Invincible Chicken Heroes] (in Slovenian). Ljubljana: Gimnazija Antona Aškerca. A comic strip representation.
- Katarina Nikolov (director) (2015). Peter Peter (Motion picture). Ljubljana: Tramal Films. An animated short film. Shown at Animafest Zagreb 6–11 June 2016.
- Maja Sever (director) (2017-11-27) [premier 2017-11-27]. Peter Klepec ali Kako postaneš pravi junak [Peter Klepec or How to Become a True Hero] (Motion picture). Ljubljana: SNG Drama. A play.
- Kovač, Anja; Kovač, Lucija (2019-03-02). Kopač, Miha (ed.). Imaš moč! - himna oratorija 2019 - Peter Klepec (Motion picture). Illustrated by Juan Juvančič. Oratorij Slovenija. A song with lyrics slide show.
- Barbara Petrović, Aljaž Muršec (directors), Larisa Mahorič (cinematographer) (2019-07-09). Mahorič, Larisa; Petrič, Miha (eds.). Imaš moč - Oratorijska zgodba 2019 (Motion picture). Destrnik: Oratorj Sv. Urban - Destrnik. A live action short film.
- Gašper Jarni (director), Mira Artnak Bizjak (producer), Marjan Artnak (cinematographer, editor) (2022-12-11). Peter Klepec (Motion picture). Osilnica: KUD Jazbec, Lesart, Marjan Artnak. A live action short film.
- Polanc, Denis (2022). Peter Klepec. Translated by Volavšek, Beno (1st ed.). Celje: Studio Risar. ISBN 9789619500491. Tirage: 500. A comic strip.
- Ingrid Žorž, Tina Malnar, Katarina Leš (directors), Katarina Leš (choreographer) (2023-11-18). Petar Klepac, dječak sa sretnim mislima [Petar Klepac, the Boy with Happy Thoughts] (Motion picture) (in Serbo-Croatian). Čabar: Osnovna škola "Petar Zrinski" u Čabru, Područna škola Tršće, Festival dječjeg glazbenog stvaralaštva, Udruga Vrijednice. A children's play that won 2nd place at the Festival dječjeg glazbenog stvaralaštva.
- Balen Kufner, Katarina (2025-02-08). Legenda o Petru Klepcu [The Legend of Petar Klepac] (in Serbo-Croatian).

== Contemporary ==
- Primc, Jože (1989-03-16). "Čigav junak je Peter Klepec?" [Whose Hero is Peter Klepec?]. Dolenjski list (in Slovenian). p. 20. ISSN 0416-2242.
- Niedorfer, Srečko (1990). "Je Peter Petar in Klepec Klepac?" [Is Peter Petar and Klepec Klepac?]. 7D (in Slovenian). pp. 38–39. ISSN 0351-8485.
- Primc, Jože (1993-07-01). "Izlet v deželo Petra Klepca" [A Trip to the Land of Peter Klepec]. Dolenjski list (in Slovenian). p. 15. ISSN 0416-2242.
- Frković, Alojzije (2007-09-01). "Petar Klepac: Legendarni šumski div Čabarskog kraja dobio spomenik" [Petar Klepac: The Legendary Forest Giant of the Čabar Region Gets a Monument]. Šumarski list (in Serbo-Croatian). 101 (9–10): 487–488. ISSN 0373-1332.
- Škiljan, Filip [in Hungarian] (2012). Kulturno-historijski spomenici Gorskog kotara i Ogulinsko-plaščanske zavale [Cultural and Historical Monuments of Gorski Kotar and the Ogulin-Plaški Valley] (in Serbo-Croatian). Zagreb: Srpsko narodno vijeće. ISBN 978-953-7442-10-1.
- Hudelja, Mihaela (2012). "Lesena skulptura Petra Klepca" [Wooden Sculpture of Peter Klepec]. Etnoinfolab (in Slovenian). Archived from the original on 2024-04-01.
- Zupan Sosič, Alojzija [in Slovenian] (2013). "Heroji in herojinje v sodobnem slovenskem romanu" [Heroes and Heroines in the Contemporary Slovenian Novel]. Heroji in slavne osebnosti na Slovenskem (in Slovenian). pp. 213–228. ISBN 978-961-237-597-3.
- Željan, Katja (2014-03-20). "Slovenci ne bi smeli biti kot Peter Klepec" [Slovenes Shouldn't Be Like Peter Klepec]. Delo (in Slovenian). ISSN 1854-6544. Archived from the original on 2022-07-06.
- Moric, Anja (April 2015). "Peter Klepec: od (lokalnega) junaka do (nacionalne) prispodobe šibkosti". Ars & Humanitas. 9 (1): 204–226. doi:10.4312/ars.9.1.204-226. ISSN 2350-4218. English translation: Moric, Anja (30 April 2015). "Peter Klepec: From a (Local) Hero to an Allegory (National) of Weakness". Ars & Humanitas. 9 (1): 204–226. doi:10.4312/ars.9.1.204-226. ISSN 2350-4218.
- Kociper, Alenka (2016-11-17). "Nekoč preganjal Turke, danes privablja turiste" [Once He Fought the Turks, Today He Attracts Tourists]. Slovenske novice (in Slovenian). eISSN 2232-5050. Archived from the original on 2016-02-09.
- Štimec, Maja (2016). Skrb za kulturno dediščino v deželi Petra Klepca na primeru Petruvo [Care for Cultural Heritage in the Land of Peter Klepec in the Case of Petruvo] (Thesis) (in Slovenian). Ljubljana: Fakulteta za družbene vede Univerze v Ljubljani (published 2016-11-11). hdl:20.500.12556/RUL-86909.
- Krmpotić, Marinko (2017-09-25). "Etnolozi u Čabru: Petar Klepac – junak koji je spojio dvije domovine" [Ethnologists in Čabar: Petar Klepac – A Hero Who United Two Homelands]. Novi list (in Serbo-Croatian). eISSN 1334-1545. Archived from the original on 2024-04-01.
- Javni zavod za turizem in kulturo Kočevje (September 2018). "The Peter Klepec Adventure Trail". Kočevsko. Archived from the original on 2024-04-01.
- Moric, Anja; Perinić Lewis, Ana (2019). "Peter Klepec – silni slovensko-hrvaški junak?". Močni, modri in dobri: O junakih slovenske folklore. Zupaničeva knjižnica. Vol. 48. Ljubljana: Znanstvena založba Filozofske fakultete Univerze v Ljubljani, 🖶 Birografika Bori. pp. 109–140. ISBN 978-961-06-0262-0. Tirage: 300. Online publication 2019-11.
- Močnik, Nataša (2020-09-05). "Peter Klepec". Slovenski dom London. Archived from the original on 2020-09-29.
- K., M. (2021-05-31). "V Osilnici skušajo dodaten zagon turizmu dati s trženjem zgodbe o Petru Klepcu" [In Osilnica, They Are Trying to Give an Additional Boost to Tourism by Marketing the Story of Peter Klepec]. Dolenjski list (in Slovenian). eISSN 1581-0550. Archived from the original on 2024-04-02.
- Takovski, Aleksandar (2021-06-28). "From Epic to Memic". Historični seminar. Vol. 14. pp. 135–167. doi:10.3986/9789610505440_07. ISBN 978-961-05-0543-3.
- Ivanišević, B (2023-08-13). "Legenda o Petru Klepcu". Nematerijalna kulturna baština Gorskog kotara i Like [Intangible Cultural Heritage of Gorski Kotar and Lika] (Thesis) (in Slovenian). Pula: Fakultet ekonomije i turizma Sveučilišta Jurja Dobrile u Puli. pp. 27–29.
- Tratnik, Polona (2024). "Political Functions of Slovene National Mythological Heroes with Regard to the Changing Socio-Political Circumstances and Needs". Narrative Culture. 11 (2): 167–191. doi:10.1353/ncu.2024.a941976. eISSN 2169-0251.
- Puljar D'Alessio, Sanja (2024-12-30). "Langue Durée of More-than-Human-Sociality of Gorski Kotar Forests and Contemporary Environmental Challenges". Studia ethnologica Croatica. 36: 47–71. doi:10.17234/SEC.36.3. eISSN 1848-9532.

=== Tourism ===
- Urbanec, Andreja (2023-04-22). "Ideja za družinski izlet v deželo Petra Klepca" [An Idea for a Family Trip to the Land of Peter Klepec]. Aleteia (in Slovenian). Archived from the original on 2023-04-21.
- Občina Osilnica (2021-09-20). "Peter Klepec". Občina Osilnica: Spletna stran občine Osilnica. Archived from the original on 2021-10-28.
- Ćuk, Borna (2017-01-03). "Izlet kroz Gorski Kotar od Gornjeg Jelenja do Prezida". Putovanja Hrvatskom: Putopisi, izleti, prijedlozi za putovanja po Hrvatskoj. Archived from the original on 2024-04-01.
- Turistička zajednica grada Čabra (March 2013). "Petar Klepac". Čabar: službene web stranice Turističke zajednice grada Čabra. Archived from the original on 2013-03-18.
- Občina Osilnica (March 2012). "Dežela Petra Klepca". Občina Osilnica: Vstopite v legendo narave!. Archived from the original on 2012-04-01.
- Malnar, Željko (2007). "Petar Klepac - legenda ili istina? Gorskog kotara i Kupske doline" [Petar Klepac - Legend or Truth? of Gorski Kotar and the Kupa Valley]. Kuća "Sobol" (in Croatian). Archived from the original on 2007-07-04. Reviews have been written.
- Turk, Hrvoje (1995-06-30) [received 1994-08-25]. "Položaj i turistički resursi čabarskog kraja" [Location and Touristic Resources of the Cabar Area]. Tourism and Hospitality Management. 1 (1): 201–213. doi:10.20867/thm.1.1.21. ISSN 1330-7533. Online publication 2017-06-08.

== Bibliography ==
- Animafest (2016). "Peter Peter". Animafest Zagreb. Archived from the original on 2024-04-02.
- Bonifačić, Ruža; Zebec, Tvrtko (March 2017). Izabrana djela Nikole Bonifačića Rožina (PDF). Zagreb: Institut za etnologiju i folkloristiku. ISBN 978-953-8089-11-4.
- Borka Kucler, Slavica (1999). "Mitološko izročilo Slovencev: dr. Zmago Šmitek". Didakta (in Slovenian): 97. ISSN 0354-0421.
- Čas, Bojan (1999). "Kristalna gora - mitološko izročilo Slovencev : Zmago Šmitek: Kristalna gora - mitološko izročilo Slovencev". Kamniški občan (in Slovenian): 5. ISSN 0351-8124.
- Čičerov, Maja (2020). Obravnava izbranih del Franceta Bevka v predšolskem obdobju (Thesis). Ljubljana: Pedagoška fakulteta Univerze v Ljubljani (published 2020-09-29). hdl:20.500.12556/RUL-121016.
- CroInfo Team (2011). "Petar Klepac - legenda ili istina?". CroInfo Portal. Archived from the original on 2011-01-19.
- Goljevšček, Alenka (2011). Od A(brama) do Ž(upančiča) - vsebine 765 dram slovenskih avtorjev. ISBN 978-961-6860-02-4.
- Hrženjak, Majda (1998). "Zmago Šmitek: Kristalna gora. Mitološko izročilo Slovencev. Forma sedem. Ljubljana 1998". Časopis za kritiko znanosti (in Slovenian). 27 (194): 193–194. ISSN 0351-4285.
- IEF (2024). "Hrvatske narodne pjesme, običaji i priče kotara Delnice, 1953". DIEF (in Serbo-Croatian). Archived from the original on 2024-04-01.
- Janeš, Ivan (2021-09-09). "Čuvari goranske baštine (uz dodjelu književne nagrade Novog lista Gorančica za 2020, 9. srpnja)". Vijenac (717–718). eISSN 1333-9249. Archived from the original on 2024-04-02.
- Kapidžić, Sanja (2021-10-28). "Pobjednik "Gorančice" Zlatko Pochobradsky predstavio svoj roman "Petar Klepac"". Moja Rijeka. Archived from the original on 2022-08-09.
- Krall, Jože (1975-01-02). "Anton Ožbolt, Dežela Petra Klepca. Založba Borec, Ljubljana, 1974; strani 577 + III". Prispevki za novejšo zgodovino (in Slovenian). 16 (1–2): 226–230. ISSN 0353-0329.
- Krmpotić, Marinko (2020-05-14). "Zlatko Pochobradsky: "Petar Klepac" – priča o legendarnom goranskom junaku". Novi list. eISSN 1334-1545. Archived from the original on 2020-09-24.
- Krmpotić, Marinko (2021-07-09). "Književna nagrada "Novog lista": Dobitnik "Gorančice" za 2020. godinu je Zlatko Pochobradsky za roman "Petar Klepac"". Novi list. eISSN 1334-1545. Archived from the original on 2021-07-09.
- Krmpotić, Marinko (2021-08-02). "Treća "Gorančica" Zlatku Pochobradskyju: "Gorani žive i ponašaju se baš kao Petar Klepac"". Novi list. eISSN 1334-1545. Archived from the original on 2021-09-20.
- Krmpotić, Marinko (2023-06-05). "O mitskoj goranskoj ličnosti: Predstavljena knjiga od 108 priča o Petru Klepcu". Novi list. eISSN 1334-1545. Archived from the original on 2023-06-05.
- Kropej, Monika (2005). "Ritualno branje sveta: Zmago Šmitek: Mitološko izročilo Slovencev - svetinje preteklosti, Študentska založba, Ljubljana, 2004". Delo (in Slovenian). 47 (137): 12. ISSN 0350-7521.
- Lučić, Nenad (2021-07-09). "Zlatko Pochobradsky romanom "Petar Klepac" osvojio svoju treću Gorančicu". Hrvatski radio: Radio Rijeka. Archived from the original on 2022-10-01.
- Marjanić, Suzana (2007-12-19). "Zmago Šmitek, Mitološko izročilo Slovencev, Svetinje preteklosti, Študentska založba, Ljubljana 2004., 430 str". Narodna umjetnost: hrvatski časopis za etnologiju i folkloristiku (in Serbo-Croatian). 44 (2): 265–267. ISSN 0547-2504.
- Matičić, Bruna (2021-10-29). "Promocija knjige Zlatka Pochobradskog: Predstavljen "Petar Klepac"". Novi list. eISSN 1334-1545. Archived from the original on 2021-10-29.
- Mencej, Mirjam (1999). "Zmago Šmitek. Kristalna gora: mitološko izročilo Slovencev - Ljubljana ..." Etnolog (Nova vrsta) (in Slovenian). 9 (2): 225–227. ISSN 0354-0316.
- Mencej, Mirjam (2005). "Zmago Šmitek: Mitološko izročilo Slovencev: svetinje preteklosti. Ljubljana: Študentska založba, 2004, 429 str.: ilustr. (Knjižna zbirka Posebne izdaje)". Etnolog (Nova vrsta). 15: 470–473. ISSN 0354-0316.
- Mencej, Mirjam (2009). "Zmago Šmitek: Mitološko izročilo Slovencev [The mythological tradition of the Slovenes - relics of the past] Študentska založba: Ljubljana, 2004, 429 pp". Acta Ethnographica Hungarica. 54 (2): 457–459. ISSN 1216-9803.
- Monar, Sanja (October 2021). "Zavičajna srijeda: Pobjednik "Gorančice" Zlatko Pochobradsky i "Petar Klepac" u gostima". Torpedo: glas zaljeva. ISSN 2991-9681. Archived from the original on 2024-04-01.
- Moric, Anja; Perinić Lewis, Ana (November 2019). "Peter Klepec – silni slovensko-hrvaški junak?". Močni, modri in dobri: O junakih slovenske folklore (in Slovenian). Znanstvena založba Filozofske fakultete Univerze v Ljubljani. pp. 109–140. ISBN 978-961-06-0262-0.
- Muršič, Rajko (2000). "Zmago Šmitek, Kristalna gora: mitološko izročilo Slovencev". Glasnik Slovenskega etnološkega društva (in Slovenian). 40 (1–2): 134–135. ISSN 0351-2908.
- Nežmah, Bernard (2005-05-15). "Zmago Šmitek: Mitološko izročilo Slovencev : Študentska založba, Ljubljana 2004". Mladina (in Slovenian). 19: 74. ISSN 0350-9346.
- Pleterski, Andrej (2000). Zmago Šmitek: Kristalna gora. Mitološko izročilo Slovencev (in Slovenian). pp. 267–268.
- Pavletich, Mark (2025-02-21). "Croatian History Series explores Croatian myths and legends on the 4th webinar". Croatians Online.
- Razpotnik, Špela (2000). "Bruno Bettelheim: Rabe čudežnega: o pomenu pravljic - (Studia humanitatis, Ljubljana, 1999, 464 strani, prevedla Jana Unuk". Socialna pedagogika (in Slovenian). 4 (1): 101–105. ISSN 1408-2942.
- Stanonik, Marija (2007). "Slovenski poskusi sintetičnih predstavitev slovenske oziroma slovanske mitologije: ob knjigi Mitološko izročilo Slovencev". Traditiones (in Slovenian). 36 (2): 183–190. ISSN 0352-0447.
- Sterle, Jadran (2005). "Mitološko izročilo Slovencev: Zmago Šmitek: Študentska založba, Ljubljana 2000". Slovenija.svet: revija za Slovence po svetu (in Slovenian). 2 (8–9): 57. ISSN 1581-9213.
- Štumberger, Saška (2024-11-19). "Pravopisne obravnave priimkov s stališča spola". Predpis in norma v jeziku [Regulation and Norm in Language]. Simpozij Obdobja. Vol. 43. pp. 359–365. eISSN 2784-7152. ISBN 978-961-297-442-8.
- Tatar, Nensi (2022-05-20). "Pochobradskym: Gerovski osnovci razgovarali o legendarnom goranskom junaku Petru Klepcu". Gorske novosti. Archived from the original on 2022-06-30.
- n.s. (2023-09-05). "Na Festivalu dječjeg glazbenog stvaralaštva 2. nagrada dodijeljena mjuziklu PŠ Tršće 'Petar Klepac, dječak sa sretnim mislima'". OŠ Petar Zrinski Čabar.
