= Ivo Brnčić =

Yugoslav author and literary critic

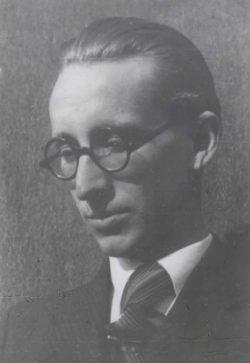
Brnčić in the 1930s

Ivo Brnčić or Brnčič (13 March 1912 – May 1943) was a Yugoslav author, essayist and literary critic of Croat origin, particularly notable for his assessment of interwar Slovene literature. Most of his works were published posthumously.

== Biography ==
Brnčić was born in the village of Sveta Trojica v Slovenskih Goricah, Lower Styria, then part of the Austro-Hungarian Empire. His father was an Austrian public servant from Croatia. His mother came from a notable Slovene left wing intellectual family: her brother was the writer Lojz Kraigher, and Ivo Brnčić's cousins were the Communist politicians Boris and Sergej Kraigher. After finishing the high school in Ljubljana, Brnčić enrolled at the University of Ljubljana, later switching to the University of Zagreb, where he studied Slavic philology. Because of his openly Marxist convictions, he could not find a job for a long time. He made his living mostly from writing and translating. In 1940, he got employed as a professor in an elementary school in Drniš, Croatia (then also part of the Kingdom of Yugoslavia).

During World War II, he was mobilized in the Croatian Home Guard. In 1942 he tried to escape and join the Yugoslav Partisans. He was captured and imprisoned in Zenica, but was later acquitted of charges of desertion and mobilized again into the armed forces of the Independent State of Croatia. In May 1943, Brnčić escaped for the second time, but before he could join the Partisans he was captured by the Chetniks, who killed him and buried in an unknown location.

== Work and legacy ==
Brnčić wrote several lyrical poems, short stories and theatre plays, but he is most known for his works in literary criticism and essayism. He became known mostly for his articles in journals, but he didn't publish a single book during his lifetime. Only in the 1950s, the literary historians Herbert Grün and Janko Kos edited his collected works. The first volume, which included his essays and critiques, was published in 1954 under the title A Generation in front of the Closed Doors (Slovene: Generacija pred zaprtimi vrati). This expression, used in one of his earlier essays from the 1930s, became a popular and widespread designation of the generation of left wing Slovenian authors in the 1930s and early 1940s who embraced a lyrical version of neorealism (notably Ciril Kosmač, Miško Kranjec, Ludvik Mrzel, Karel Destovnik Kajuh and others).

Since the publication of his collected works in the 1950s, Brnčić has been frequently considered the foremost theorist of the social realist and neorealist literary movements in Slovenia in the 1930s. His name has been strongly linked to the critical Marxist intellectual scene in the interwar period. Together with the left liberal Josip Vidmar and the Catholic France Vodnik, Brnčić was considered as the foremost Slovene literary critic of the 1930s.

== See also ==
- Croats of Slovenia
