= Slovene Writers' Association =

Non-profit writers' association

The Slovene Writers' Association (Slovene: Društvo slovenskih pisateljev) is a non-profit association of Slovene writers based in Ljubljana.

The association was founded on 21 April 1872 in Ljubljana at the initiative of Davorin Trstenjak who also became its first president. The statute of the organization was confirmed by the Duchy of Carniola on 10 May 1872. The constituent congress was held on 14 September 1872 while regular meetings took place in the Hotel Evropa until the 1885. It operated under various names over the years and re-adopted its original name Društvo slovenskih pisateljev in 1968. It provides a platform for writers, poets, playwrights and essayists who participate to promote common cultural and social inetersts.

The association has also made considerable efforts in promoting Slovene literature abroad. Its international activities include maintaining contacts with cultural institutions and writers' societies all around the world and collaborating with literary journals and magazines. Its own publication Litterae slovenicae (called Le Livre Slovène before 1991) publishes excerpts, poems and short stories by Slovene writers in translation, making Slovene literature available to a world audience.

It annually bestows the Vilenica Prize to a Central European author for their achievements in the field of literature and essay writing at the festival which takes place in the Vilenica Cave in the Slovenian Littoral. Since 1986 it has also annually awarded the Jenko Award for the best poetry collection in Slovene published in the previous two years.

== Presidents ==
- Davorin Trstenjak 1872
- Rajko Perušek 1895–1915
- Anton Funtek
- Alojz Gradnik
- Oton Župančič
- France Koblar 1938–1945
- Miško Kranjec (2 terms)
- France Bevk (2 terms)
- Ivan Potrč (2 terms)
- Mile Klopčič
- Beno Zupančič
- Matej Bor 1959–1961
- Anton Ingolič
- Mira Mihelič
- Janez Menart
- Ciril Kosmač
- Tone Pavček 1979–1983
- Tone Partljič 1983–1987
- Rudi Šeligo 1987–1991
- Dane Zajc 1991–1995
- Evald Flisar 1995–2001 (3 terms)
- Tone Peršak 2001–2003
- Vlado Žabot 2003–2007 (2 terms)
- Slavko Pregl 2007–2009
- Milan Jesih 2009–2011
- Veno Taufer 2011–2014
- Ivo Svetina 2014–

== See also ==
- Association of Writers of Yugoslavia
