= List of Slovenian dancers =

A list of notable dancers from Slovenia.

- Stanislava Brezovar
- Pino Mlakar (1907–2006)
- Meta Vidmar
