= France Koblar =

Slovene literary historian, editor and translator

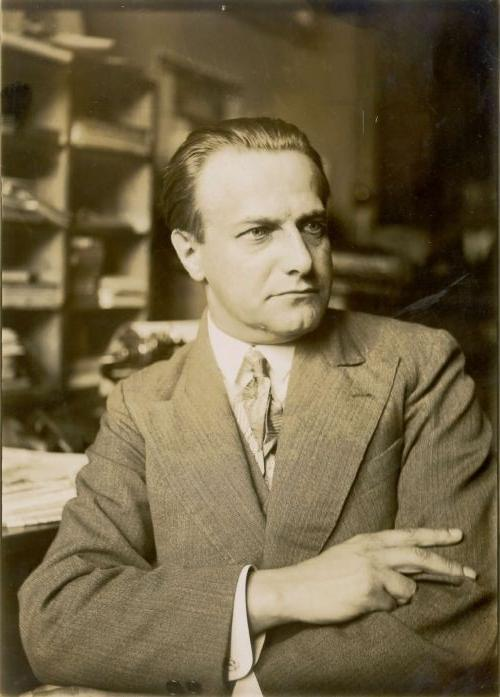
- Born: 29 November 1889; Železniki, Austria-Hungary (now in Slovenia)
- Died: 11 January 1975 (aged 85); Ljubljana, Socialist Federal Republic of Yugoslavia (now in Slovenia)
- Occupations: literary historian, editor and translator
- Writing career
- Notable awards: Prešeren Award; 1951 for his work in theatrical culture, literary history and criticism Prešeren Award; 1969 for his life's work in literature

France Koblar (29 November 1889 – 11 January 1975) was a Slovene literary historian, editor and translator.

Koblar was born in Železniki in what was then Austria-Hungary and is now in Slovenia. He studied Slavic languages and Latin at Vienna. He worked as a secondary school teacher at the Poljane Grammar School in Ljubljana from 1919 till 1945 and became a professor of dramaturgy and history of theatre at the newly founded Ljubljana Theatre Academy in 1946 where he worked until 1970. He was president of the Slovene Writers' Association between 1938 and 1945. He was made a member of the Slovenian Academy of Sciences and Arts in 1964. Between 1966 and 1975 he was chairman of the Slovenska matica cultural institution and publishing house. He was twice the recipient of the Prešeren Award, in 1951 for his work in theatrical culture, literary history and criticism and again in 1969 for his life's work in literature.

The Železniki Cultural and Artistic Society in the town of his birth is named after Koblar.

== Selected works ==
- Po dvanajstih letih: Ljudska igra v štirih dejanjih, (1923)
- Starejša slovenska drama, (1951)
- Novejša slovenska drama, (1954)
- Simon Gregorčič: njegov čas, življenje in delo, (1962)
- Dvajset let slovenske drame, (1965)
- Slovenska dramatika: (1, 2), (1972)
- Moj obračun, (1976)
