= Jama pri Dvoru =

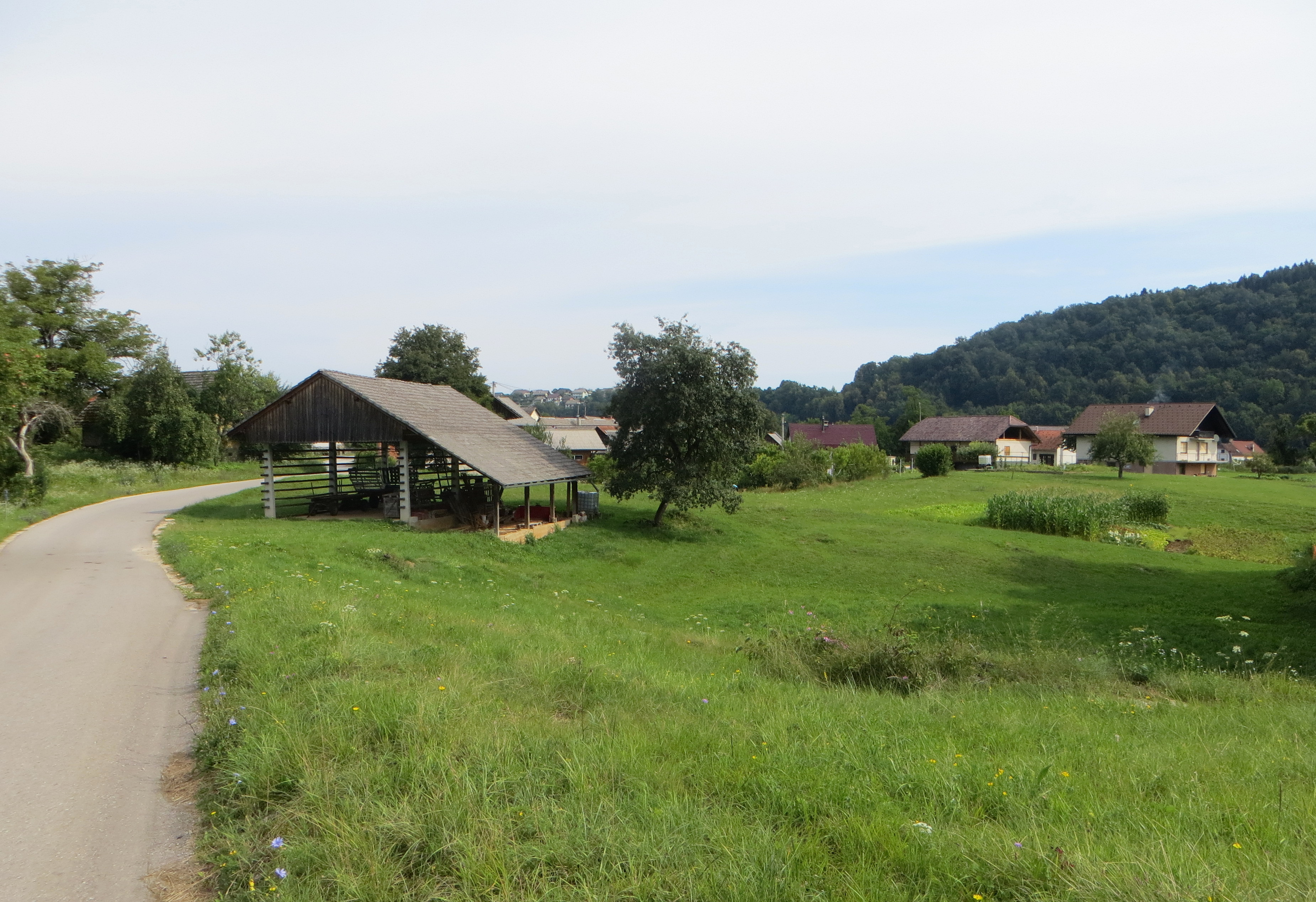

- Location in Slovenia
- Coordinates: 45°48′25.47″N 14°57′45.63″E
- Country: Slovenia
- Traditional region: Lower Carniola
- Statistical region: Southeast Slovenia
- Municipality: Žužemberk

Area
  - Total: 1.8 km^{2} (0.69 sq mi)
- Elevation: 204.2 m (670 ft)

Population (2002)
  - Total: 102

Jama pri Dvoru (pronounced [ˈjaːma pɾi ˈdʋɔːɾu], German: Gruben) is a settlement in the Municipality of Žužemberk in southeastern Slovenia. It lies on the right bank of the Krka River opposite Dvor. The area is part of the historical region of Lower Carniola. The municipality is now included in the Southeast Slovenia Statistical Region.

== Name ==
The name of the settlement was changed from Jama to Jama pri Dvoru (literally, 'Jama near Dvor') in 1953. The name Jama means 'cave', and it is derived from the fact that there are several caves in the village itself along the Krka River, including Černiček Cave (Slovene: Černičkova jama), with a length of 150 meters (490 ft) and a depth of 21 meters (69 ft). Booming Cave, (Slovene: Bobnova jama), with a length of 175 meters (574 ft) and a depth of 25 meters (82 ft), lies just west of the village.

== Notable people ==
Notable people that were born or lived in Jama pri Dvoru include:

- Fran Bradač (1885–1970), classical philologist and translator
