= Fran Albreht =

Slovenian poet, editor, politician and partisan

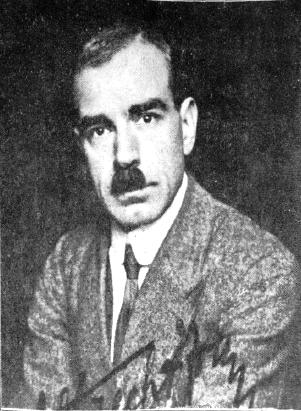
Fran Albreht in the 1920s

Fran Albreht (17 November 1889 – 11 February 1963) was a Slovenian poet, editor, politician and partisan. He also published under the pseudonym Rusmir.

He was born as Franc Albrecht in the Upper Carniolan town of Kamnik in what was then the Austro-Hungarian Empire. He grew up in a liberal milieu, but he later came closer to more leftist views. He studied at the University of Vienna and became a literary critic and a neo-romantic poet.

From the 1922 till the 1932 Albreht was editor of the liberal literary magazine Ljubljanski zvon. After the crisis of the journal in 1932, which emerged from different interpretations of Slovene identity and attitudes towards the centralist policies in the Kingdom of Yugoslavia, Albreht left the journal and established, together with the literary critic Josip Vidmar and author Ferdo Kozak, a new magazine called Sodobnost ("Modernity"). Under Albreht, Vidmar and Kozak, the new magazine became the foremost progressive journal in Slovenia, in which also many Marxists and Communists could publish their articles under pseudonyms.

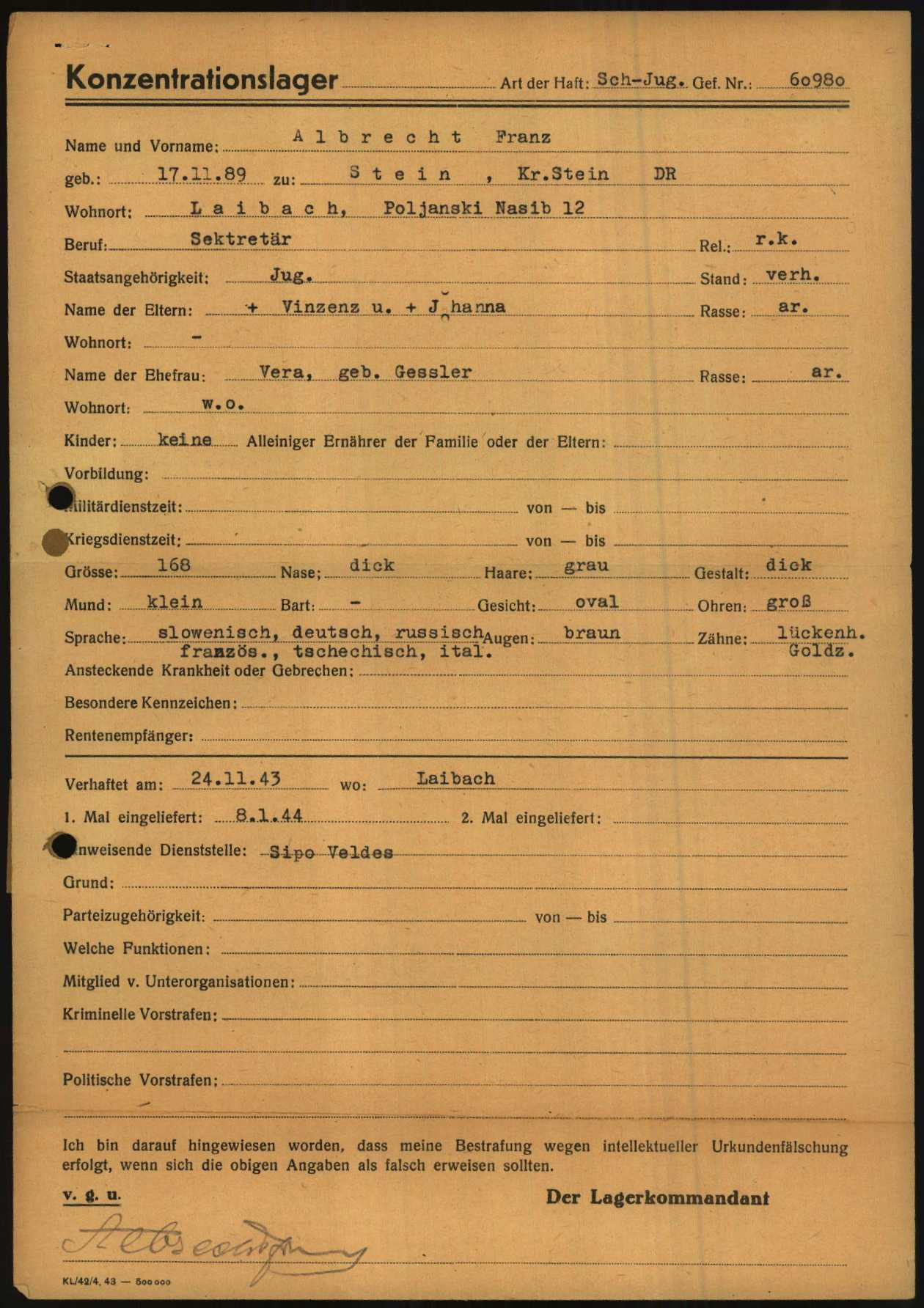
Registration form of Fran Albreht as a prisoner at Dachau Nazi Concentration Camp

After the Axis invasion of Yugoslavia in April 1941, Albreht became an active member of the Liberation Front of the Slovenian People in Ljubljana. He was imprisoned by Italian fascist authorities on a number of occasions. In 1944, the Nazis sent him to Dachau concentration camp.

Soon after the liberation from Nazi occupation and the establishment of the Communist regime in Yugoslavia in 1945, he was appointed mayor of Ljubljana. He served in that office between 1945 and 1948. In 1948, he was dismissed and shortly imprisoned under the suspicion of anti-Communist activity.

He was married to the poet Vera Albreht. He died in Ljubljana in 1963 and is buried in the Žale city cemetery.

== Works ==
- Zadnja pravda ("The Last Lawsuit"), 1934
- Pesmi ("Poems"), 1966
- Gledališke kritike ("Theatre Critiques"), 1973

== See also ==
- List of Slovenian language poets
- Slovenian literature
- Culture of Slovenia
- Yugoslav People's Liberation War

Preceded by Pavel Lunaček	Mayor of Ljubljana; 1945–1948	Succeeded by Matija Maležič
