= Fran Bradač =

Slovene classical philologist and translator (1885-1970)

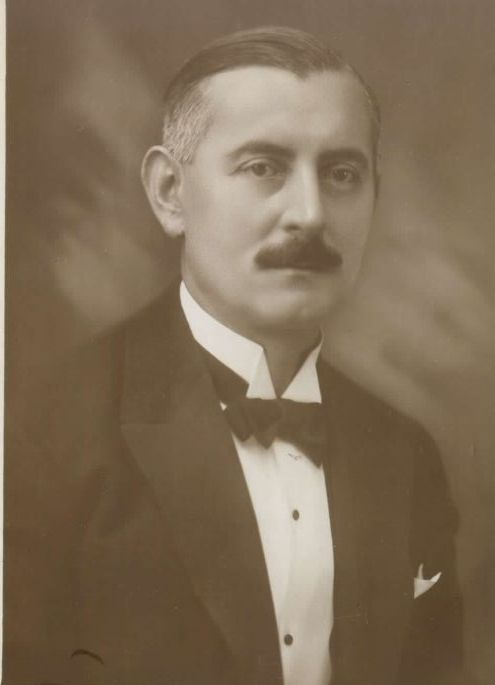
- Born: June 15, 1885; Jama pri Dvoru, Slovenia
- Died: May 2, 1970 (aged 84); Ljubljana, Slovenia
- Occupation: Philologist

Fran Bradač (June 15, 1885 – May 2, 1970) was a Slovene classical philologist and translator.

== Life and work ==
Bradač was born in Jama pri Dvoru. He studied classical philology in Vienna from 1905 to 1910, and then continued his education in Zagreb, where he received his doctorate in 1920, followed by further study in Prague and Berlin. He taught classical philology at the University of Ljubljana's Faculty of Arts from 1923 until 1945, when he was forced to retire by the new communist regime. Together with Josip Osana, he published the only grammar of Greek in Slovene to date. He also wrote a Greek textbook, compiled a dictionary of foreign vocabulary, and authored several dictionaries of Czech, Latin, and German. He translated a number of important Classical poems and comedies into Slovene, and he also translated material from modern languages, including Czech (Jaroslav Hašek and Karel Čapek) and German (Heinrich Mann, Erich Kästner, and others).

After the Second World War, Bradač was forcibly retired in August 1945 in an ideological purge by the new minister of culture, Ferdo Kozak. Bradač was forbidden from voting, threatened with having his home confiscated, and placed on a meager pension. His textbooks continued to be used, but with his name pasted over.

== Bibliography ==
- Slovar tujk (Dictionary of Foreign Vocabulary)
- Slovensko-latinski slovar (Slovene-Latin Dictionary)
- O goskici, ki se je učila peti (The Gosling That Learned to Sing), translation of a work by Karel Hroch
- Izbrane pesmi rimskih lirikov Katula, Tibula in Propercija: tekst in komentar (Selected Poems from the Roman Lyrics of Catullus, Tibullus, and Propertius: Text and Commentary)
