= Dane Zajc =

Slovenian poet and playwright

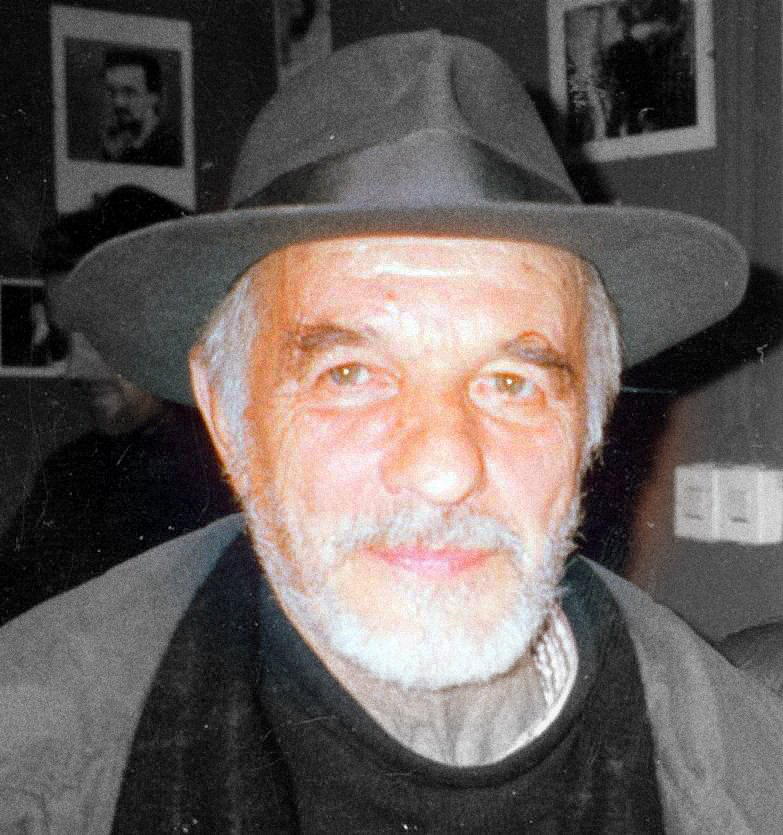
- Born: 26 October 1929; Zgornja Javoršica, Kingdom of Yugoslavia (now in Slovenia)
- Died: 20 October 2005 (aged 75); Ljubljana, Slovenia
- Occupations: Poet, Playwright
- Writing career
- Literary movement: Existentialism, Surrealism

Dane Zajc (26 October 1929 – 20 October 2005) was a Slovenian poet and playwright. He served as president of the Slovene Writers' Association (1991–1995), and was awarded the prestigious Prešeren Award for lifetime achievement (1981). Together with Edvard Kocbek and Gregor Strniša, he is considered the most important Slovenian poet of the second half of the 20th century.

== Life ==
He was born as Danijel Zajc in the Upper Carniolan village of Zgornja Javoršica near Moravče, in a relatively wealthy peasant family. He was traumatized by the experience of World War II. At the age of 13, he witnessed the brutal death of his father, when the Nazis burned his home, throwing his father in the flames. Two of his brothers fell in the Partisan resistance. During the war years, he dropped out of school. He continued his education after 1945, first in a special course for young war victims in Domžale, and then in Kamnik and Gornja Radgona.

In 1947, he enrolled in Poljane Grammar School in Ljubljana. During this time, he befriended several young writers and poets. Together with Lojze Kovačič, Viktor Blažič in Janez Menart, he founded the youth literary magazine called Mi, mladi (We, the Young); where he published his first poems.

In 1951, he was arrested by the Communist authorities, and sentenced to three months in prison. As a result, he was expelled from the Poljane Grammar School. After his release from prison, he was drafted to the Yugoslav People's Army. Bad experiences with the Yugoslav Communist regime affirmed his skepticism against the Communist ideology, turning him into a lifelong anti-Communist.

Between 1953 and 1955, he worked as a clerk at the post office. In 1955, he got a job at the City Library of Ljubljana, where he worked until retirement in 1989. In 1958, he completed his high school with external exams, but was not allowed to enroll to the university.

In the mid-1950s, Zajc became part of a circle of critical Slovene intellectuals, known as the Critical generation. The group was formed by poets (besides Zajc, also Gregor Strniša and Veno Taufer), writers (Lojze Kovačič, Marjan Rožanc, Rudi Šeligo), playwrights (Dominik Smole, Primož Kozak), and theoreticians (Taras Kermauner, Veljko Rus, Janko Kos, Jože Pučnik). They introduced contemporary existentialist currents in Slovenia, opening a series of discussions regarding philosophical, cultural and political issues of the time. Zajc was member of the editorial board of the alternative journal Revija 57, the first independent journal in Slovenia after 1945, and of the journal Perspektive.

After both journals were banned by the Communist regime, Zajc withdrew from public life, but continued writing and publishing his poetry and plays. He again returned to the public scene in the late 1980s, during the Slovenian Spring, becoming a vocal supporter of the Slovenian Democratic Opposition. During the 1990s, he served as president of the Slovenian Writers' Association.

He died in Ljubljana.

The American singer and songwriter Chris Eckman released a CD in 2008 called The Last Side of the Mountain. It contains more than 10 adaptations of poems by Dane Zajc, translated into English by Eckman's Slovenian wife Anda Eckman.

== Work ==
He was an author of neo-expressionist poems about irresolution and fear of contemporary man (Požgana trava, Ubijavci kač), poetic dramas based on Slovenian folklore (Mlada Breda, Voranc, Jaga baba, antique and other motifs (Otroka reke. Paris: Les Éditions de l'Amandier, 2003. Traduit par Jana Pavlič).
