= Primož Kozak =

Slovenian playwright & essayist (1929-1981)

- Born: September 11, 1929; Ljubljana, Drava Banovina, Kingdom of Yugoslavia
- Died: December 22, 1981 (aged 52); Ljubljana, SR Slovenia, SFR Yugoslavia
- Occupations: essayist, playwright
- Father: Ferdo Kozak
- Relatives: Juš Kozak (uncle)

Primož Kozak (11 September 1929 – 22 December 1981) was a Slovenian playwright and essayist. Together with Dominik Smole, Dane Zajc and Taras Kermauner, he was the most visible representative of the so-called Critical generation, a group of Slovenian authors and intellectuals that reflected on the paradoxes of the communist regime, and the relation between power and individual existence in general.

== Life and work ==
Kozak was born in Ljubljana, in what was then the Kingdom of Yugoslavia, to a prominent left liberal intellectual family. His father Ferdo Kozak was a renowned essayist and literary critic, his uncle Juš Kozak was the editor of the national-progressive journal Ljubljanski zvon. His other uncle Vlado Kozak was an important communist activist, known for having drafted both Edvard Kardelj and Boris Kidrič, two of the most influential Slovenian communists, into the Communist Party of Yugoslavia. During World War II, Primož lived under a false identity with a temporary adoptive family, as both his father and uncles were prominent figures in the partisan resistance.

Primož studied philosophy at the University of Ljubljana and theatre directing at the Academy for Theatre, Radio, Film and Television. During his student years, he established contacts with a group of young Slovene intellectuals who tried to challenge the rigid cultural policies of the Titoist regime. These included, among others, Taras Kermauner, Janko Kos, Dominik Smole, Dane Zajc, Veljko Rus, Jože Pučnik, Gregor Strniša, Marjan Rožanc, and others. He collaborated in the alternative journals Revija 57 and Perspektive, which were both closed down by the regime. He also collaborated in the alternative theatre Stage 57, which was also closed down by the regime in 1964.

Kozak wrote several plays on the issue of revolution, revolutionary terror, and the relation between power and personal integrity. The themes of his plays were all highly controversial for the communist regime. To avoid direct confrontation, Kozak set them in foreign and distant countries, such as Cuba or in countries of the Soviet bloc. Since Yugoslavia was a non-aligned country at the time, criticism of Stalinism or other "deviant" forms of socialism was generally permitted. His best-known play is "The Affair" (Afera), set during the anti-Fascist resistance in Northern Italy, but in fact a metaphorical account of the trial against the dissident Jože Pučnik. In the play "Dialogues" (Dialogi), set in an anonymous Eastern European country, Kozak described the paranoic atmosphere of the Stalinist show trials. The play "Congress" (Kongres) deals with ideological struggles at the university and student protests. In the "Legend of St. Che" (Legenda o svetem Che), Kozak deals with the issue of modern political myth in the case of Ernesto Che Guevara.

He also published essays, the best known of which is "Peter Klepec in America" (Peter Klepec v Ameriki), a travelogue through the United States in which he reflects on modern civilization from a Slovene and Yugoslav standpoint.

Kozak died due to pheochromocytoma in Ljubljana.

== Sources ==
- Janko Kos, Slovenska književnost (Ljubljana: Cankarjeva založba, 1982), 174-175.
