= Alenka Goljevšček =

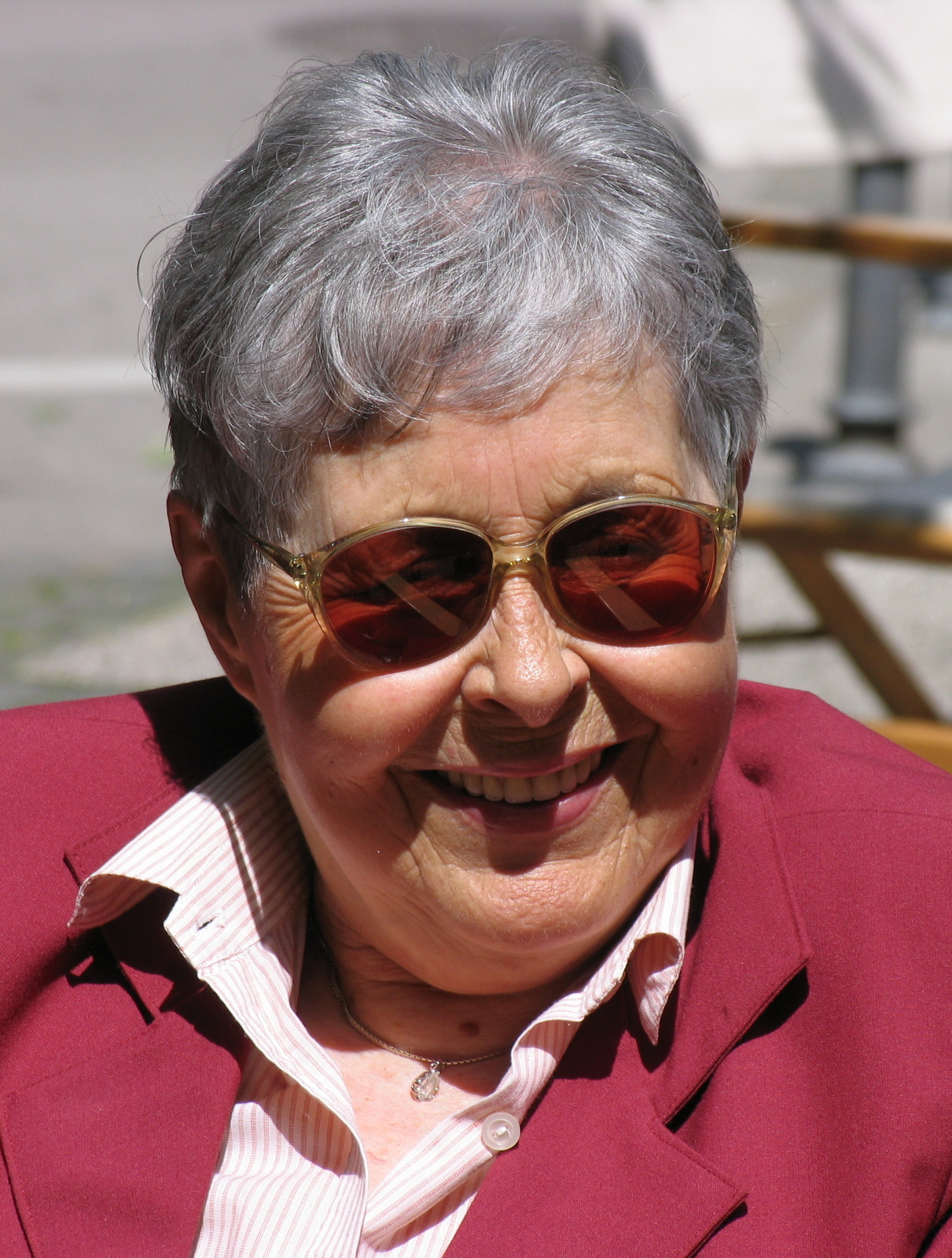
- Born: 7 September 1933; Ljubljana, Slovenia
- Died: 17 January 2017 (aged 83)
- Occupations: Writer, essayist and playwright
- Writing career
- Notable awards: Levstik Award; 1988 for Med bogovi in demoni

Alenka Goljevšček (7 September 1933 – 17 January 2017) was a Slovene writer, essayist and playwright.

She won the Levstik Award in 1988 for her book on Slovene mythology Med bogovi in demoni (Amongst Gods and Daemons). She is also a playwright.

Her husband was the literary historian, philosopher and essayist Taras Kermauner. She died on 17 January 2017.

== Bibliography ==
=== Youth fiction ===
- Čudozgode (Wonderstories), 1974
- Po štirih, po dveh (On Four Legs, On Two Legs), 1996

=== Youth plays ===
- Čudežni kamen (The Magic Stone), 1979
- Če zmaj požre mamo (When the Dragon Eats Mother), 1981
- Hiša (The House), 1981
- Kralj Matjaž, kako se imaš? (King Matjaž How Are You?), 1981
- Volk in rdeča kapica (The Wolf and Little red Riding Hood), 1982
- Zakaj avto zjutraj noče vžgati (Why the Car Won't Start in the Morning), 1982
- Gornastenisedimuha (Theflyonthewall) 1983

=== Adult plays ===
- Srečanje na Osojah (Meeting in Osoje), 1981
- Pod Prešernovo glavo (Under Prešeren's Bust), 1984
- Zelena je moja dolina (Green is My Valley), 1985
- Lepa Vida 87 (The Beautiful Vida 87), 1987
- Srečna draga vas domača (Happy Beloved Home Village), 1999

=== Monographs ===
- Mit in slovenska ljudska pesem (Myth and Slovene Traditional Songs), 1982
- Med bogovi in demoni: liki iz slovenske mitologije (Amongst Gods and Daemons: Figures from Slovene Mythology), 1988
- Pravljice, kaj ste? (Fairytales What Are You?), 1991
- New age in krščanstvo (New Age and Christianity), 1992
