= Rudi Šeligo =

Slovenian writer and politician

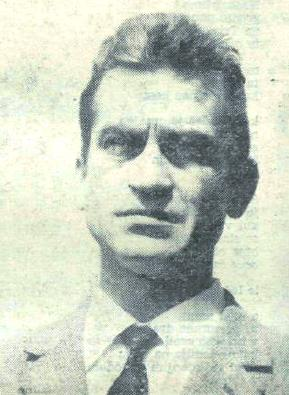
- Born: 14 May 1935; Sušak, Rijeka, Kingdom of Yugoslavia (now in Croatia)
- Died: 22 January 2004 (aged 68); Ljubljana, Slovenia
- Occupations: Writer; playwright; essayist; politician
- Writing career
- Literary movement: Modernism, avant-garde, magical realism, existentialism

Rudi Šeligo (pronounced [ˈɾúːdi ʃɛˈlìːɡɔ]; 14 May 1935 – 22 January 2004) was a Slovenian writer, playwright, essayist and politician. Together with Lojze Kovačič and Drago Jančar, he is considered one of the foremost Slovenian modernist writers of the post-World War II period.

== Life ==
Šeligo was born in a Slovene family in Sušak, Kingdom of Yugoslavia, now part of the city of Rijeka, Croatia. In 1939, he moved with his family to the industrial town of Jesenice in north-western Slovenia. After finishing high school, he worked as an industrial worker in the local iron mill for few years. He then moved to the small town of Tolmin, where he finished a teacher's academy. In 1956, he moved to Ljubljana, where he enrolled in the University of Ljubljana, studying philosophy and sociology. In Ljubljana, Šeligo became involved with a group of young and intellectuals known as the Critical generation. He published several short stories in the alternative literary journal Revija 57. He became friends with the dissident intellectual Jože Pučnik, and witnessed his arrest in 1958.

In 1962, he became a lecturer at the School for Sociology and Working Management in Kranj, and continued publishing his works, mostly in the alternative journal Perspektive. When the journal was forced to close down by the Communist regime, Šeligo entered a "creative strike", refusing to publish any of his works for two years. In the late 1960s, he started collaborating the renowned literary theorists and philosopher Dušan Pirjevec Ahac.

In the 1987, Šeligo was elected as president of the Slovene Writers' Association. In a period of social and political ferment, Šeligo used his position to transform the association in an open platform of public debate, promoting the values of pluralism and democracy. In 1989, he was among the founding members of the Slovenian Democratic Union. In the first free elections in Slovenia in 1990, he was elected to the Slovenian Parliament. Between 1990 and 1994, he also presided the Advisiory Board of the Slovenian Radio and Television Broadcast. In 1994, he joined the Slovenian Social Democratic Party. Between June and November 2000, he served as Minister for Culture in the short lived centre-right government of Andrej Bajuk. During this short period, he compiled the so-called "National Program for Culture", an integrative document on the aims of cultural policy in Slovenia, which became the basis for the cultural policies of all later Slovenian governments. In 2001, he became a member of the Slovenian Academy of Sciences and Arts.

He died in Ljubljana and was buried in the Žale cemetery.

== Work ==
In the 1950s, Šeligo was among those who brought radical avantgardist innovations to the Slovenian literature. His short novel "The Triptych of Agata Schwarzkobler" (Triptih Agate Schwarzkobler), published in 1968, is considered the first example of reism in Slovene literature. His early novels were under the influence of the French Nouveau roman, and were characterized by thick descriptions and anti-psychologic attitude.

Political offices
Preceded by Jožef Školč	Minister of Culture of the Republic of Slovenia; 7 June 2000 – 11 November 2000	Succeeded by Andreja Rihter
