= Zgornja Javoršica =

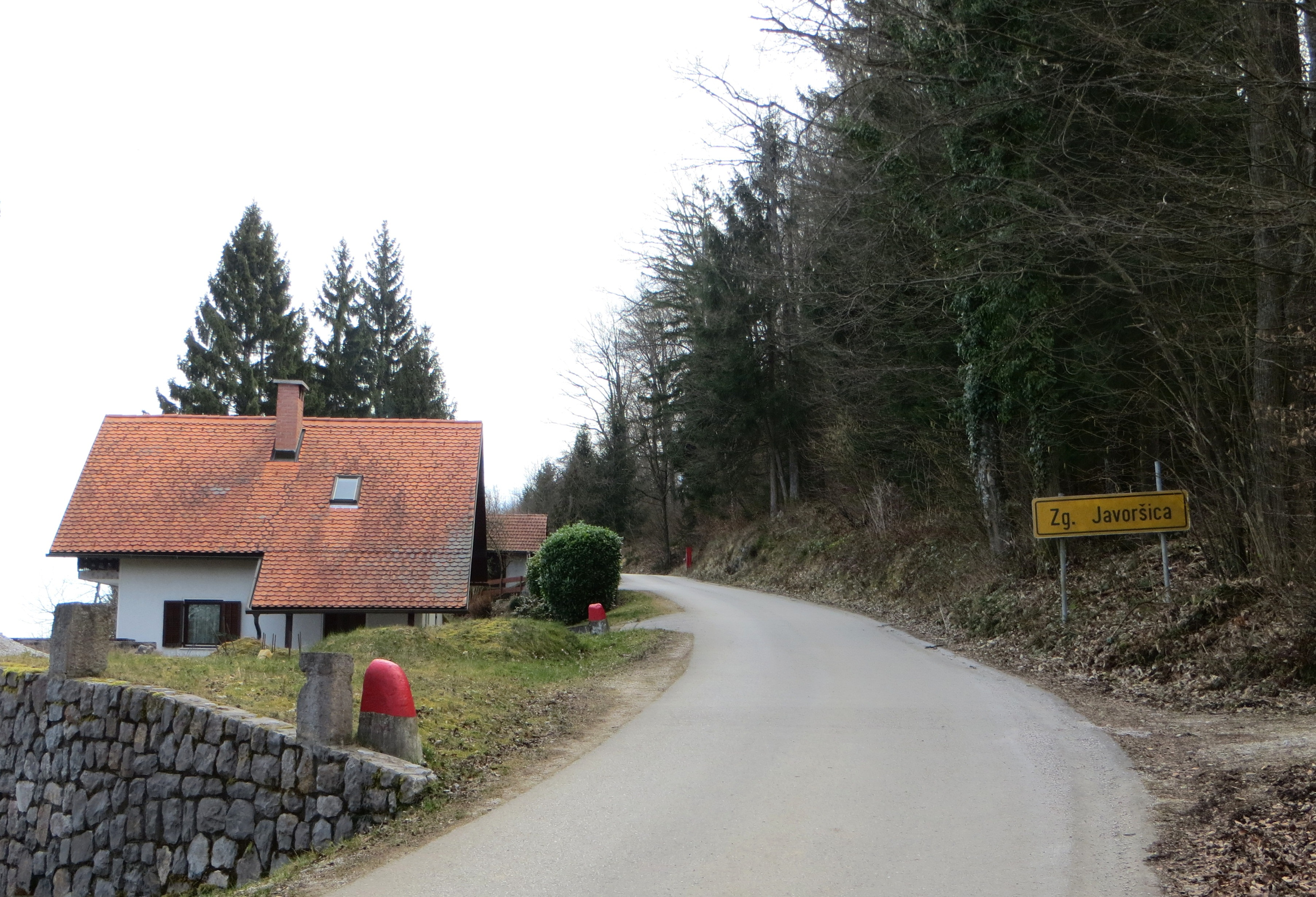

- Location in Slovenia
- Coordinates: 46°7′9.7″N 14°41′52.84″E
- Country: Slovenia
- Traditional region: Upper Carniola
- Statistical region: Central Slovenia
- Municipality: Moravče

Area
  - Total: 1.82 km^{2} (0.70 sq mi)
- Elevation: 572.3 m (1,878 ft)

Population (2002)
  - Total: 63

Zgornja Javoršica (pronounced [ˈzɡoːɾnja ˈjaːʋɔɾʃitsa]; German: Oberjaworschitz) is a village in the Municipality of Moravče in central Slovenia. The area is part of the traditional region of Upper Carniola. It is now included with the rest of the municipality in the Central Slovenia Statistical Region.

It is the birthplace of the Slovene poet Dane Zajc.
