= Meta Vidmar =

Slovene modern dancer

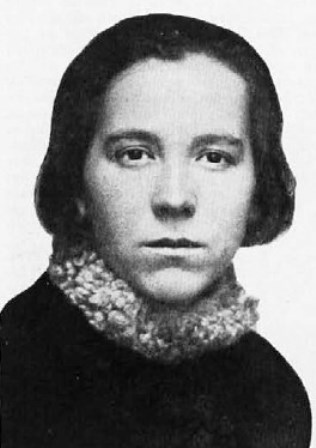
- Born: Metoda Vidmar; 1899; Ljubljana
- Died: 1975 (aged 75–76); Ljubljana
- Known for: Dance
- Movement: expressionist dance

Meta Vidmar (born Metoda Vidmar, 15 May 1899 – 1 November 1975) was the first Slovene modern dancer, notable for establishing the Mary Wigman dance school in Ljubljana in 1930, the first modern dance school in Slovenia.

== Life ==
Meta Vidmar was born in Ljubljana. She was the sister of the literary critic and politician Josip Vidmar, the chess master Milan Vidmar, the Yugoslavia gymnastics team coach for the Olympic Games in London in 1948 Stane Vidmar, and the publisher Ciril Vidmar (her twin).

In 1927, she graduated from the dance school in Dresden established and led by Mary Wigman, with whom she spent seven years and who gave her a license to open a dance school in her name in Slovenia. She died in Ljubljana.

Her school in Ljubljana taught the first Slovene dancers and teachers of modern dance, such as Marta Paulin, Živa Kraigher, and Marija Vogelnik, who then taught subsequent classes of contemporary dancers in Slovenia after World War II.

== See also ==
- Expressionist dance
- Mary Wigman

== Sources ==
- 2012 Zajc, Jasmina. Razvoj sodobnega plesa v Sloveniji. MA thesis, Littoral University, Koper
- 2011 Knez, Jasna. V spomin: Živa Kraigher plesalka. Priloga Primorskih novic, Koper, 6.6.
- 2010 Upornice na prepihu zgodovine, Delo, 10 February, Ljubljana
- 2009 Rupnik, Urša. Izrazni ples - izginjajoča veja slovenskega sodobnega umetniškega plesa?, BA thesis, Faculty of Social Sciences, University of Ljubljana, Ljubljana
- 2009 Sodobni ples na Slovenskem, Intakt Dance Studio, established in 1987 website, Ljubljana
- 2003 Uršula Teržan. Sodobni ples v Sloveniji, Knjižnica Mestnega gledališča ljubljanskega, Ljubljana
- 1975 Marija Vogelnik. Sodobni ples na Slovenskem, Knjižnica Kinetikon I., Ljubljana
- 1952 Programski letak Javne produkcije Plesne šole Mete Vidmarjeve, Drama SNG Ljubljana, 4.7.
- 1936 Valens Vodušek. Plesna šola Mete Vidmarjeve, Slovenski dom, 2.7, Ljubljana
