= Veljko Rus =

Veljko Rus (8 December 1929 – 26 February 2018) was a Slovenian sociologist, writer and academic.

He was born in Višnja Gora near Ljubljana, Slovenia (then part of the Kingdom of Yugoslavia) to a prominent upper-middle-class family. His father, Josip, was a left-liberal political activist, leader of the Sokol movement in the Drava Banovina, and one of the founding members of the Liberation Front of the Slovenian People. After finishing high school in Ljubljana, Veljko Rus enrolled with the University of Belgrade Faculty of Philosophy. He obtained a PhD in sociology at the University of Zagreb with a thesis on Power and Responsibility in Working Processes.

In the late 1950s, he was part of the so-called "critical generation", a group of young Slovenian intellectuals who followed a critical attitude towards the communist system in the former Yugoslavia, challenging the cultural policies of the Titoist regime. He wrote in alternative journals Revija 57 and Perspektive.

He was visiting fellow at several western universities, including Poitiers in France (1957/58), Columbia (1968/69), and Berkeley. In 1958, he started working as an assistant professor at Faculty of Arts of the University of Ljubljana; in 1960, he was removed from university together with Taras Kermauner because their friendly relations with the dissident Jože Pučnik. He then worked as a professor at the School of Organizational Sciences in Kranj, and at the Faculty of Sociology, Political Science and Journalism in Ljubljana (later renamed to Faculty of Social Sciences).

In the early 1970s, after the removal of the Reformist Communist leadership of Stane Kavčič, Rus was again dismissed from the university. He worked at the Institute for Sociology and Philosophy until the early 1990s, when he was readmitted at the Faculty for Social Sciences.

He has been a visiting professor at Columbia University, the University of Uppsala, the Stockholm University, the University of Copenhagen and the Free University of Berlin. Since 1991, he has been member of the Slovenian Academy of Sciences and Arts.

== Work ==
Rus has authored 31 monographs and more than 190 scientific articles. Among his most important works are:

- Man, Work, and Structures (Človek, delo in strukture, 1970)
- Work and Power, his first major monograph in English, an enquiry in the sociology of work
- Welfare State and Welfare Society (Socialna država in družba blaginje, 1990), an anticipation of the problem of welfare policies in post-socialist societies
- Ownership and Participation (1992), a study on the sociological problems of economic privatization
- The Enterprisation and Socialization of the State (Podjetizacija in socializacija države, 2001), a critical evaluation of the modernization of power structures brought by the new social management

== See also ==
- Contributions to the Slovenian National Program
