= Ferdo Kozak =

Slovenian author, playwright, editor and politician (1894-1957)

Ferdinand Kozak
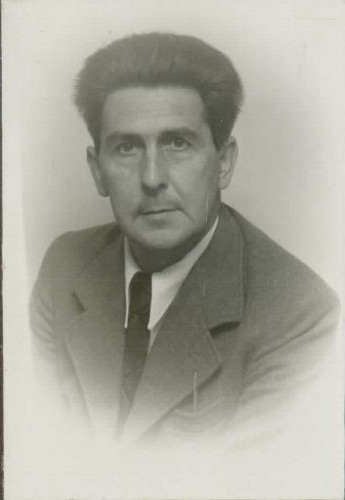
- Ferdo Kozak
- Born: 28 October 1894; Ljubljana, Austria-Hungary
- Died: 8 December 1957 (aged 63); Ljubljana, SR Slovenia, SFR Yugoslavia
- Occupations: Playwright, author & politician
- Relatives: Juš Kozak (brother); Vlado Kozak (brother); Primož Kozak (son)
- Military career
- Allegiance: Austria-Hungary
- Branch: Austro-Hungarian Army
- Service years: 1914-18
- Conflicts: World War I; Eastern Front

Ferdo Kozak (28 October 1894 – 8 December 1957) was a Slovenian author, playwright, editor and politician.

== Biography ==
He was baptized Ferdinand Kozak in an upper middle class family in Ljubljana, then part of the Austro-Hungarian Empire. His older brother Juš Kozak also became an author and literary critic, while his younger brother Vlado Kozak became a communist politician.

In 1913, Kozak joined the radical Yugoslavist subversive youth organization Preporod, which was engaged in anti-Austrian and pro-Yugoslav activities, in connection with other organizations of Austro-Hungarian South Slavs, such as Young Bosnia. During World War I, he was drafted into the Austro-Hungarian Army and fought on the Eastern Front.

After the War, he studied Slavic philology in Prague, where he became friends with many Slovenes living in the Czechoslovak capital, such as the painter Božidar Jakac, philosopher Anton Trstenjak and sociologist Mihajlo Rostohar. In 1926, he moved to Belgrade, where he worked as a librarian. In 1929, he returned to Ljubljana, where he worked as professor at the Ljubljana Classical Lyceum until 1942, except for a few years in the early 1930s, when he was punitively transferred to Novo Mesto because of his public opposition to the dictatorship of King Alexander I of Yugoslavia.

As a fierce opponent of Yugoslav centralism and nationalism, Kozak was among the founders of the left liberal journal Sodobnost, which he edited together with Josip Vidmar, Fran Albreht, and Stanko Leben. The journal supported Slovenian autonomy within a democratic and federal Yugoslavia. In the years before World War II, it started moving to positions sympathetic to the Communist Party.

After the Axis invasion of Yugoslavia in April 1941, Kozak was among the founders of the Liberation Front of the Slovenian People, a communist-dominated left-wing coalition that eventually fought the Nazi German and Fascist Italian annexation of Slovenia. Kozak was imprisoned by the Italians in 1942. After the Italian armistice, he served as member of the Yugoslav Partisan war mission to the allies in Bari. He returned to the liberated territory in Slovenia in 1944, and was appointed as Secretary for Culture in the Slovenian National Liberation Council. After World War II, he served as minister of culture between 1945 and 1946. As minister of culture, he led ideological purges at the University of Ljubljana, forcibly removing prominent professors and staff such as the philologist Fran Bradač, the philosopher France Veber, and the literary historian Joža Glonar. He also served as chairman (speaker) of the People's Assembly of the People's Republic of Slovenia from 1946 to 1953, although he never became a member of the Communist Party of Slovenia.

Kozak died in Ljubljana. His son Primož Kozak was also a renowned playwright and essayist.
