= Ludvik Mrzel =

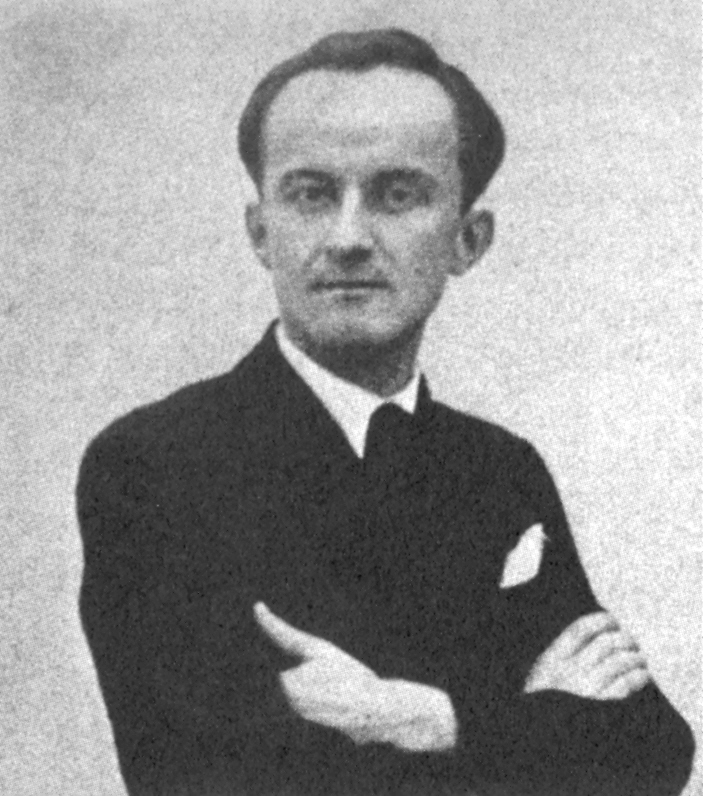
- Born: 28 July 1904; Loka pri Zidanem Mostu, Austria-Hungary (now in Slovenia)
- Died: 29 September 1971 (aged 67); Ljubljana, Socialist Federal Republic of Yugoslavia (now in Slovenia)
- Occupation: Writer

Ludvik Mrzel (pen name Frigid) (28 July 1904 – 29 September 1971) was a Slovene writer, poet, dissident and journalist.

== Early life and prewar career ==
Ludvik Mrzel was born on 28 July 1904 in Loka pri Zidanem Mostu, Slovenia. After completing elementary school he enrolled in a secondary school, from which he was expelled for participating in a miners' strike in Trbovlje. He drew upon this experience for his 1937 collection of short stories Bog v Trbovljah (God in Trbovlje). Mrzel completed his secondary-school education in Jagodina and Ćuprija, Serbia. He then enrolled in medical school, but soon switched his studies to philosophy and Slavic studies.

Mrzel found employment as a journalist and worked as an editor for the journals Mladina and Svobodna mladina. He wrote literary and arts features for the newspaper Jutro and also wrote lyric verse, novellas, and socially-colored stories. His writing style included Expressionism and Social realism. He also published book and theater reviews, and reports about cultural events among Slovene emigrants to the United States.

== Second World War ==
During the Second World War Mrzel was a prisoner in Italian and German prisons, including the Dachau concentration camp. Upon the liberation of the camp, he became the editor of a periodical issued at the camp, the Dahavski poročevalec (Dachau Reporter).

== Postwar ==
After his return to Slovenia, he became the director of the Slovene National Theater and assistant director of the National Theater in Maribor.

In 1945, Josip Broz Tito's communists seized control of Slovenia and established a communist government. As a result, many writers and journalists including Mrzel who were critical of Tito and the communist regime were arrested and jailed. Mrzel was eventually judged to be an "insufficiently cultured person for building socialism." He was charged with "mysticism" and "literary fetishism," and was eventually sentenced to 12 years in prison in 1949 during the Dachau trials. He served his sentence in Ljubljana, Bileća, and Goli Otok before being released on parole on 20 October 1955. After his release, he supported himself as a freelance writer and translator. He first lived with his sister in the Polje district of Ljubljana and then in Piran and in Zagradec. He was partially pardoned in 1971. Despite his release, Mrzel was kept under surveillance by the communist secret police (UDBA).

Mrzel's translations include Russian and Ukrainian fairy tales and writings by Knut Hamsun, Alexis Steiner, Theodor Plievier, Franz Werfel, Antonius Roothaert, Vasily Chuikov, Andrey Yeryomenko, Günther Anders, Jean Rousselot, John Knittel, Sergei Aleksandrovich Tokarev, and Karl May.

Mrzel died on 29 September 1971 in Ljubljana.

== Selected works ==
- Luči ob cesti (Lights along the Street; sketches, 1932)
- Peter se zbudi v življenje (Peter Awakens into Life; novel, 1933)
- Bog v Trbovljah (God in Trbovlje; short stories, 1937)
- Ogrlica (The Necklace; poetry, 1962)
