= Janko Kos =

Slovenian literary historian and theoretician

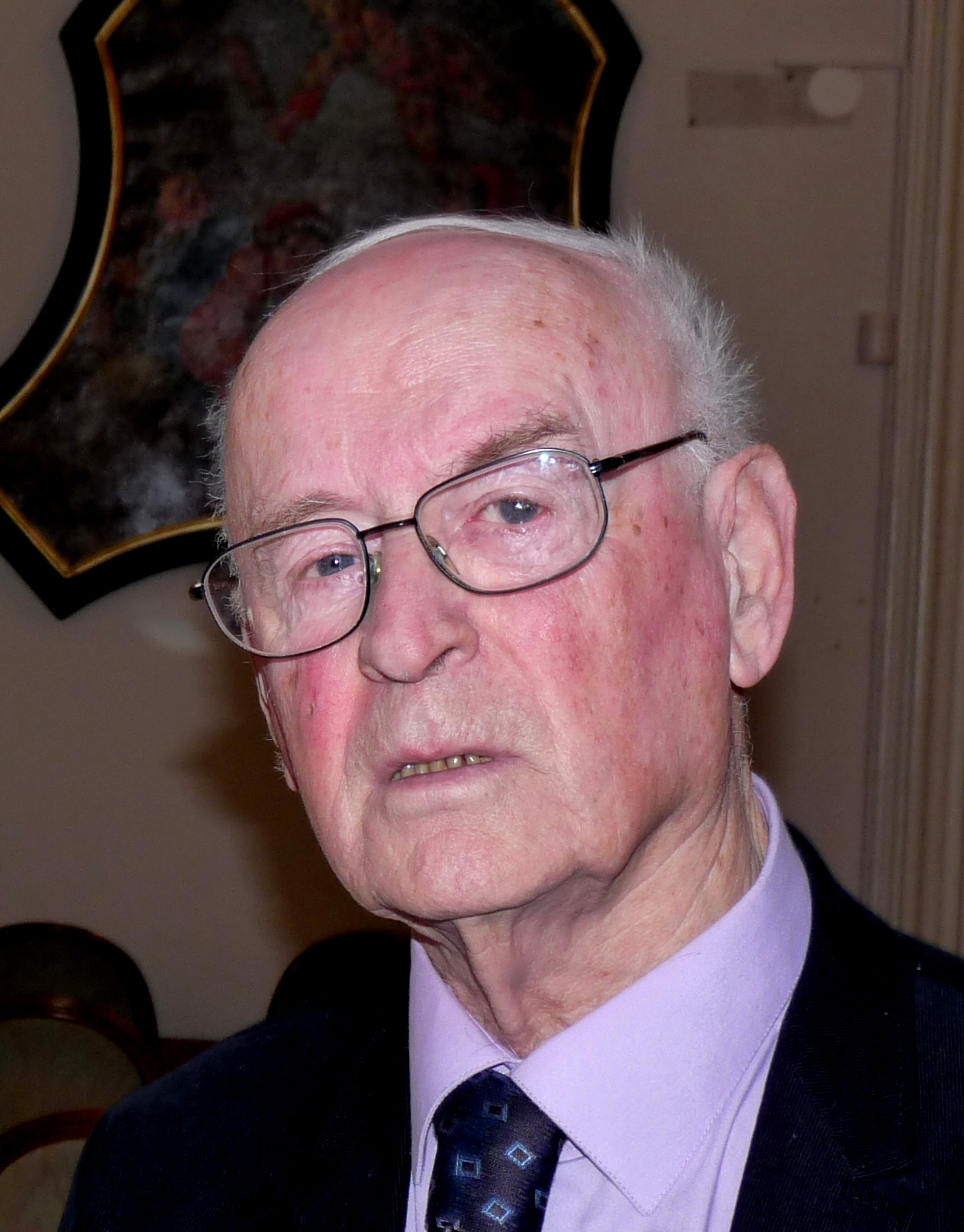
Janko Kos

Janko Kos (born 9 March 1931) is a Slovenian literary historian, theoretician, and critic.

== Early life ==
He was born in Ljubljana in what was then the Kingdom of Yugoslavia as the son of the painter and sculptor Tine Kos. His father was a liberal and freethinker (during World War II a supporter of the pro-Communist Liberation Front of the Slovenian People), while his mother was a devout Roman Catholic.

== Education and activism ==
He studied at the University of Ljubljana, where he graduated from comparative literature in 1956. Among his schoolmates was the famous literary scholar Dušan Pirjevec Ahac. During this period, Kos became involved in the intellectual endeavours of the "Critical generation," a group of young Slovene artists and intellectuals who challenged the cultural policies of the Titoist regime. Among Kos' closest collaborators during this time were the literary theoretician Taras Kermauner, dissident sociologist Jože Pučnik, writer Dominik Smole, essayist Primož Kozak, and the poet Dane Zajc, Kos' cousin. He wrote in the alternative journal Perspektive until they were closed by the Communist regime in 1964.

In 1969 Kos obtained his PhD at the University of Ljubljana under the supervision of Anton Ocvirk.

== Career ==
From 1970, he has taught literary theory at the university. Kos dedicated most of his scholarly career researching the literary, intellectual and personal profile of the Slovene Romantic poet France Prešeren, publishing several innovative studies in this regard. He also researched the literary work of Ivan Cankar, Matija Čop, and Valentin Vodnik. He has also written several text books of Slovene and world literature for high schools.

Since 1983, Kos has been a member of the Slovenian Academy of Sciences and Arts.

== Political views ==
Since the late 1990s, Kos has been a public supporter of the Slovenian Democratic Party. Since 2004 he has been a member of the liberal conservative civic platform Rally for the Republic (Slovene: Zbor za republiko).

== Family ==
He is the father of the literary critic Matevž Kos and the father-in-law of the writer and editor Igor Bratož.

== Sources ==
- Biography on the webportal of the Association of Slovene Writers
- Interview with Kos on the Slovenian National TV
