= Taras Kermauner =

Slovenian literary historian, critic, philosopher, essayist, playwright and translator

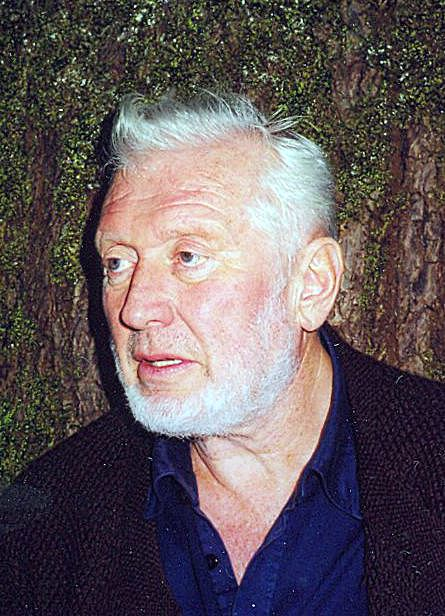
Taras Kermauner

Taras Kermauner (13 April 1930 – 11 June 2008) was a Slovenian literary historian, critic, philosopher, essayist, playwright and translator.

== Life ==
Taras Kermauner was born in Ljubljana as the son of the Slovene communist politician and intellectual Dušan Kermauner. His younger brother, Aleš, was a poet and artist. Taras Kermauner attended the Ljubljana Classical Lyceum and later studied philosophy at the University of Ljubljana, where he graduated in 1954. From 1957 to 1958, he studied in Paris under the supervision of Henri Lefebvre.

During his college years, Kermauner started collaborating with a group of Slovene intellectuals and artists who became known as the Critical generation. They published several magazines, such as Revija 57 and Perspektive, which challenged the cultural policies of the Titoist system in the Socialist Republic of Slovenia. Among Kermauner's closest collaborators during this period were the writer and playwright Dominik Smole, poet Dane Zajc, essayist and playwright Primož Kozak, literary historian Janko Kos, and sociologist and dissident Jože Pučnik.

In the early 1960s, Kermauner started a long personal friendship with philosopher and literary theoretician Dušan Pirjevec, who strongly influenced Kermauner's intellectual development. After the mid-1970s, Kermauner grew closer to Christianity and in the mid-1980s he converted to Roman Catholicism and left public life.

He spent his last twenty years in a small village in the Karst region of the Slovene Littoral, dedicating his time to writing and study. He obtained his PhD at the University of Sarajevo in 1981 with a thesis on the plays of Ivan Cankar. He dedicated most of his later study to the development of Slovenian theatre and dramatic works, in which he looked for deeper ideological and existential elements. During the same period, he expanded his intellectual interests to the sociological works of Raymond Aron, Gilles Deleuze and Jean Baudrillard.

He returned to public life shortly before his death in early 2008. Among other things, he publicly supported the newly founded social liberal party Zares. He died in Ljubljana in the spring of the same year.

He was married to the writer Alenka Goljevšček. Their daughter is poet Aksinja Kermauner. Taras Kermauner was also the father of Matjaž Hanžek, political activist, poet and Slovenian Ombudsman (2001–07).

== Work ==
Kermauner was considered the greatest researcher and expert on Slovene drama. His life work was a series of monographs, published under the common title Reconstruction and/or reinterpretation of Slovene drama, in which he analyzed all Slovene plays.

He also translated several works by György Lukács, and Tzvetan Todorov's book The Spirit of Enlightenment.
