= Josip Vidmar =

Slovenian literary critic, essayist and politician

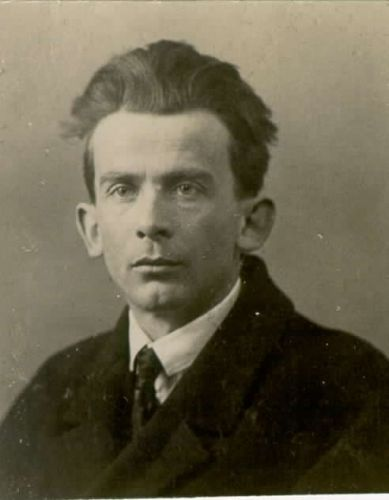
- Josip Vidmar in the 1920s

President of Slovenia
- In office 3 October 1943 – 30 January 1953
- Prime Minister: Boris Kidrič; Miha Marinko
- Preceded by: Position Established
- Succeeded by: Ferdo Kozak

Personal details
- Born: 14 October 1895 Ljubljana, Duchy of Carniola, Austria-Hungary
- Died: 11 April 1992 (aged 96) Ljubljana, Slovenia
- Party: League of Communists

Vidmar at a Partisan rally during World War II

Josip Vidmar (pronounced [ˈjóːsip ˈʋìːdmaɾ]; October 14, 1895 – April 11, 1992) was a notable Slovenian literary critic, essayist, and politician. From 1944 to 1946 he was speaker of the Slovenian People's Liberation Council (Slovenian Parliament). From 1952 to 1976 was president of the Slovenian Academy of Sciences and Arts, and from 1950 to 1964 he was the head of the academy's Institute of Literatures.

== Life ==
Vidmar was born in Ljubljana, in a progressive middle-class family. Josip had an older brother, Milan Vidmar, a notable engineer, chess player and writer. Their sister Meta Vidmar studied with the famous Mary Wigman in Dresden and upon returning to Ljubljana in 1930 established the first school of modern dance in Slovenia. He completed gymnasium school in Ljubljana and studied at the Czech Technical University in Prague. During the World War I he fought in Austria-Hungarian units on the eastern front but deserted to Russian side.

=== Anti-Yugoslavization writings ===
At the time when in the ex-Austrian Littoral, that has been given by Great Britain to Italy, a great part of Slovenes were subjected to violent Fascist Italianization, Vidmar was also against the Serbian attempts of Yugoslavization of Slovenes living in the Kingdom of Yugoslavia. He rose to prominence with his critical essays on literature and politics, including his 1933 essay The Cultural Problem of Slovene Identity.

=== Anti-fascist resistance ===
During the Italian occupation of Slovene territory (later annexed to Italy as the Province of Ljubljana), the Anti-Imperialist Front (later renamed the Liberation Front of the Slovenian People, the Slovene resistance organization) was established at Vidmar's house in Rožna Dolina, Ljubljana on 26 April 1941. A memorial now stands in front of the house. Vidmar served as the formal chairman of the organization until the end of the war.

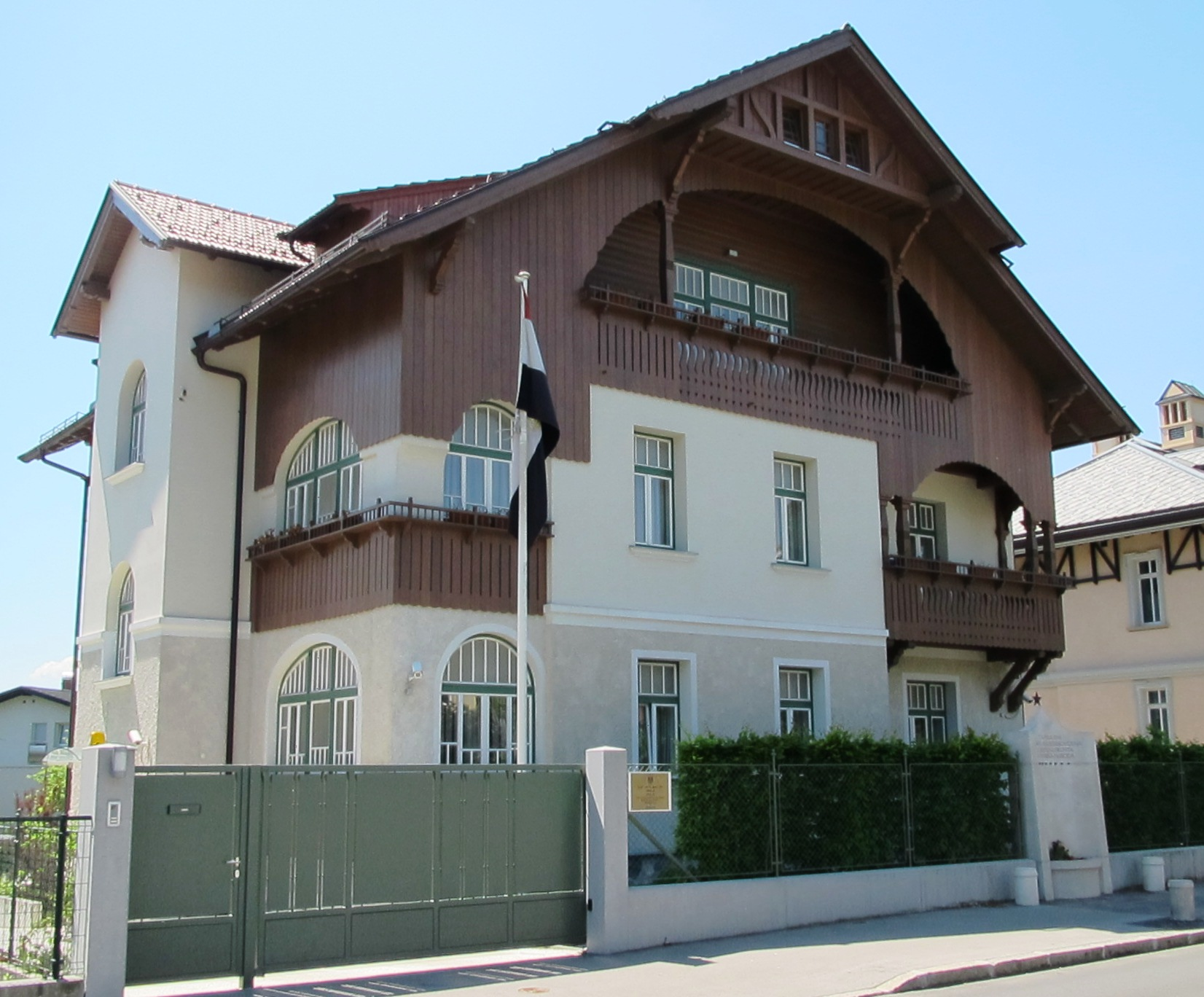
Josip Vidmar's house in Ljubljana

=== Communist period ===
Vidmar was president of the Yugoslav Federal Chamber of Peoples (later the Chamber of Republics and Provinces). He was close friend of the Croatian writer Miroslav Krleža. He was very influential in Slovenia from the mid-1950s to the mid-1970s in the cultural policies of the Titoist regime.

Josip Vidmar was awarded the title of Honorary Citizen of Novi Sad, Serbia.

He died in Ljubljana.

== Work ==
=== Translations ===
Vidmar translated works from Russian, French, Italian, German, Czech, Croatian, and Serbian into Slovenе, mostly plays; works of dramatists: Aleksey Arbuzov, Gogol, Griboyedov, Krleža, Molière, Nušić, Pushkin, Aleksey Tolstoy and other authors.

=== Essay books ===
- Literarne kritike
- Meditacije
- Polemike
- Dnevniki
- Obrazi

Preceded by Ivo Andrić	President of the Association of Writers of Yugoslavia; 1952-1958	Succeeded by Miroslav Krleža
