= Timeline of the Croatian War of Independence =

The Croatian War of Independence was fought from 1991 to 1995 between Croat forces loyal to the government of Croatia—which had declared independence from the Socialist Federal Republic of Yugoslavia (SFRY)—and the Serb-controlled Yugoslav People's Army (JNA) and local Serb forces, with the JNA ending its combat operations in Croatia by 1992.

== 1989 ==
- 9 July 1989
  - The Anti-bureaucratic revolution, political rallies of Serbs in SR Croatia, marked by Greater Serbian rhetoric

== 1990 ==
- 25 July 1990
  - Newly elected Croatian Parliament changes constitution of the Socialist Republic of Croatia, amending its name, symbols and its top leadership, embarking on a path of independence of Croatia
- 17 August 1990
  - Log Revolution
- October 1990
  - SAO Kninska Krajina proclaims autonomy
- 21 December 1990
  - SAO Krajina proclaims autonomy
- 22 December 1990
  - Christmas Constitution

== 1991 ==
- 1–3 March 1991
  - Pakrac clash
- 31 March 1991
  - Plitvice Lakes incident
- March–April 1991
  - SAO Krajina proclaims itself to be separate from Croatia and seeks unification with Serbia
- 29 April 1991
  - Blockade of Kijevo begins.
- 2 May 1991
  - Borovo Selo killings
- 6 May 1991
  - Protest against Yugoslav People's Army in Split
- 25 June 1991
  - Slovenia and Croatia declare their independence
- 7 July 1991
  - Croatian independence suspended for three months through Brioni Agreement
- 26–27 July 1991
  - Operation Stinger
- 1 August 1991
  - Dalj killings
- 17 August 1991
  - Kijevo besieged again.
- 25 August 1991
  - Battle of Vukovar begins
- 29 August - 22 September 1991
  - Battle of Gospić
- 3–4 September 1991
  - Battle of Kusonje
- 14 September 1991
  - Start of the Battle of the barracks
- 16–22 September 1991
  - Battle of Šibenik
- 16 September – 5 October 1991
  - Battle of Zadar
- 22 September 1991
  - Capture of Varaždin Barracks
- 29 September 1991
  - Capture of Bjelovar Barracks
- 1 October 1991
  - Start of the Siege of Dubrovnik
- 4 October 1991
  - Dalj massacre
  - Bombing of the Zagreb TV Tower
- 5 October 1991
  - Croatia commences general mobilization
- 7 October 1991
  - Bombing of Banski dvori
- 10 October 1991
  - Lovas massacre
- 10–13 October 1991
  - Široka Kula massacre
- 16–18 October 1991
  - Gospić massacre
- 20 October 1991
  - Baćin massacre
- 28 October 1991
  - Massacre in Lipovača near Saborsko
- 29 October 1991 – 3 January 1992
  - Operation Hurricane-91
- 31 October 1991 – 4 November 1991
  - Operation Swath-10
- 7 November 1991
  - Massacre in Vukovići near Saborsko
- 10–12 November 1991
  - Battle of Bastajski Brđani
- 10 November 1991
  - Pula Airport incident
- 12 November 1991
  - Massacre in Saborsko
- 14 November 1991
  - Battle of the Dalmatian channels
- 18 November 1991
  - Battle of Vukovar ends, Vukovar massacre
- 18 November 1991
  - Škabrnja massacre
- 23 November 1991
  - Vance plan - Geneva Accord signed
- 28 November – 26 December 1991
  - Operation Papuk-91
- 7 December 1991
  - Murder of the Zec family
- 11–13 December 1991
  - Operation Whirlwind
- 13 December 1991
  - Voćin massacre
- 16 December 1991
  - Joševica massacre
- 17–18 December 1991
  - Operation Devil's Beam
- 21 December 1991
  - Bruška massacre
- 21 December 1991
  - Vrsar Bombing

== 1992 ==
- 7 January 1992
  - 1992 European Community Monitor Mission helicopter downing
- 15 January 1992
  - 24 countries, including 12 members of the European Communities, officially recognize Croatia as an independent state.
- 3 April 1992
  - Operation Baranja
- 30 May 1992
  - UN imposes sanctions against FR Yugoslavia
- 17–22 May
  - Operation Jaguar
- 7 June 1992 – 26 June 1992
  - Operation Jackal (also known as Operation June Dawns)
- 21–23 June 1992
  - Miljevci plateau battle
- 1 July 1991 – 13 July 1992
  - Operation Tiger
- 23 July 1992 – 8 August 1992
  - Operation Liberated Land
- 22 September 1992
  - FR Yugoslavia ousted from the UN
- 20–23 October 1992
  - Battle of Konavle
- 22 October 1991 – 1 November 1992
  - Operation Vlaštica

== 1993 ==
- 22 January 1993
  - Operation Maslenica
- 18 February 1993
  - Daruvar Agreement
- 9–17 September 1993
  - Operation Medak Pocket

== 1994 ==
- March 1994
  - Washington Agreement
- 1–3 November 1994
  - Operation Cincar
- 29 November – 24 December 1994
  - Operation Winter '94

== 1995 ==
- January 1995
  - Creation of Z-4 plan
- 7 April 1995
  - Operation Leap 1
- 1–3 May 1995
  - Operation Flash
- 2–3 May 1995
  - Zagreb rocket attack
- 4–10 June 1995
  - Operation Leap 2
- 4–7 August 1995
  - Operation Storm
- 12 November 1995
  - Signing of Erdut agreement
- November & December 1995
  - The Dayton Agreement

== See also ==
- Timeline of the breakup of Yugoslavia
- Timeline of the Yugoslav Wars
