= Timeline of the breakup of Yugoslavia =

The breakup of Yugoslavia was a process in which the Socialist Federal Republic of Yugoslavia was broken up into constituent republics, and over the course of which the Yugoslav wars started. The process generally began with the death of Josip Broz Tito on 4 May 1980 and formally ended when the last two remaining republics (SR Serbia and SR Montenegro) proclaimed the Federal Republic of Yugoslavia on 27 April 1992. At that time the Yugoslav wars were still ongoing, and FR Yugoslavia continued to exist until 2003, when it was renamed and reformed as the state union of Serbia and Montenegro. This union lasted until 5 June 2006 when Montenegro proclaimed independence. The former Yugoslav autonomous province of Kosovo subsequently proclaimed independence from Serbia in February 2008.

== SFR Yugoslavia ==
=== 1980 ===
Date	Event
4 May	Death of Yugoslav President Josip Broz Tito. A Presidency of 9 members assumes power, containing one member from each constituent republic and province, with the ninth place taken by president of the Presidium of the League of Communists of Yugoslavia.
10 June	A group of 60 writers, poets and public intellectuals in Slovenia sign a petition demanding the establishing a space of free intellectual debate, which would include the right to political criticism. The petition also demands the right to establish a new independent journal for intellectual discussion.
1 October	A group of 5 Slovenian intellectuals launch an all-Yugoslav petition for the abolition of the Article 133 of the Yugoslav Criminal Code which enables the persecution of individuals for criticising the regime.

=== 1981 ===
Date	Event
11 March	1981 protests in Kosovo: Student protest starts at the University of Pristina.
1 April	Between 5,000 and 25,000 demonstrators of Albanian nationality call for SAP Kosovo to become a constituent republic inside Yugoslavia, as opposed to an autonomous province of Serbia.
2 April	Presidency sends special forces to stop the demonstrations and declares a state of emergency in regards to Kosovo. State of emergency lasts 7 days.
3 April	End of demonstrations during which 9 people are killed and more than 250 injured.

=== 1982 ===
Date	Event
February 2	A rock and punk rock concert in support of the Polish Solidarity movement is held in Ljubljana, Slovenia.
May	In Slovenia, the alternative journal Nova revija is launched. The event is frequently considered as the beginning of gradual democratization in Slovenia.

=== 1983 ===
Date	Event
April 12	Bishops of the Serbian Orthodox Church sign a petition against the persecution of Serbs in Kosovo.
April 23	The Slovenian music group Laibach played a concert at Music Biennale Zagreb during which they presented mashups using videos of Tito and pornographic videos (Tito was shown on screen at the same time as an erect penis). This incident led to violent intervention by military and police forces. The band had to leave Croatia and was later banned from the country. Laibach was also involved in Neue Slowenische Kunst.
June to August	Alija Izetbegović was again arrested by the communists and tried in the famous Sarajevo trial of 1983. Izetbegović was accused and condemned for his writings, and in particular for the Islamic Declaration, in which he wrote that there was a renaissance among the Muslims of the world, who were waking from their lethargy. Although this work was of a theoretical nature and based on being "for" rather than "against", the communists sentenced Izetbegović's thinking to fourteen years in prison. This time he spent five years and eight months behind bars.

=== 1984 ===
Date	Event
January 1	A group of 26 Slovenian intellectuals and public figures demand the change of the Yugoslav Constitution in the way that it would explicitly protect the freedom of speech and assembly. Signatories include figures like Rastko Močnik, Alenka Puhar, Gregor Tomc, Ivo Urbančič, Pero Lovšin and Dane Zajc.
March 14	US policy toward Yugoslavia is changed with National Security Decision Directive 133, but aim of policy is shown in 1982 NSDD 54 which is calling for "silent" revolutions in communist countries.

=== 1985 ===
Date	Event
1 May	Kosovo resident Đorđe Martinović is treated for injuries caused by the forceful insertion of a glass bottle into his anus. Investigators come to different conclusions about the event, ranging from self-inflicted injuries to rape with a bottle. Martinović claims that he has been raped by an Albanian fundamentalist. This last statement creates a nationalistic outcry in Serbia.
25 May	The Serbian Academy of Sciences and Arts decides to create a memorandum about political, economic, and cultural areas of debate regarding the Serbian people in SFRY.
20 July	Presidency of SFRY accepts a report by Milan Kučan which states that the right of the Serbian nation to create its own state is not fulfilled owing to the autonomy of the provinces of Kosovo and Vojvodina.

=== 1986 ===
Date	Event
April	The 12th Congress of the League of Socialist Youth of Slovenia passes a resolution supporting the notion of civil society, with an explicit reference to environmentalist, human rights, gay rights, and pacifist grassroots movements in Slovenia. They also demand the introduction of freedom of speech, freedom of assembly, right to strike in the whole of Yugoslavia. The support of conscientious objectors provokes a confrontation with the Yugoslav People's Army.
28 May	Slobodan Milošević is elected to the position of president of the League of Communists of Serbia.
24 September	Večernje Novosti leaks the Memorandum of the Serbian Academy of Sciences and Arts.
25 September	President of Serbia Ivan Stambolić criticizes the Memorandum, stating: "It is a deadly chauvinist war manifest for Serbist commissars".

=== 1987 ===
Date	Event
20 February	The Slovenian alternative journal Nova revija publishes the Contributions to the Slovenian National Program, a collection of sixteen articles in favour of an independent and democratic Slovenia.
26 February	The "Poster Scandal" breaks out. Earlier in the year, the Slovenian neo-avantgardist artistic movement Neue Slowenische Kunst designed a poster which won a competition for the Yugoslavian Youth Day Celebration. The poster, however, appropriated a painting by Nazi artist Richard Klein, by only replacing the flag of Nazi Germany with the Yugoslav flag and the German eagle with a dove. The provocation, aiming at pointing out the totalitarian nature of the Titoist ideology, provokes an outcry among the pro-Communist public in both Slovenia and Yugoslavia.
24 April	Slobodan Milošević delivers a speech about Kosovo to a crowd of 15,000 Serbs and Montenegrins, telling them: "You will not be beaten". Later that evening, Serbian television airs a video of Milošević's speech. President of Serbia Ivan Stambolić later remarks that after watching this video he has seen "the end of Yugoslavia".
26 June	One thousand Serbs and Montenegrins from Kosovo protest outside of the Belgrade parliament building against persecution by ethnic Albanians.
2/3 September	Aziz Kelmendi, a JNA soldier of Albanian nationality, kills 4 other JNA soldiers and wounds 7 others. During the funeral Albanian-owned shops are attacked by mobs.
10 September	Reform of the Serbian constitution.
24 September	During the 8th Session of the League of Communists of Serbia, Milošević defeats Ivan Stambolić, who later resigns.
November	The Helsinki Committee of Yugoslavia was founded.
9 December	The Litostroj strike breaks out in Ljubljana, Slovenia. Workers demand the right to establish independent trade unions and political pluralization. The organizing committee for the formation of an independent the Social Democratic Party of Slovenia is formed. The event is considered as the beginning of the process of political pluralization in Slovenia.

=== 1988 ===
Date	Event
12 February	A committee of Serbian academics demands the creation of a "Serbian Autonomous Oblast" in the territory of Bosnia and Herzegovina and Croatia.
7 April	The Croatian film Život sa stricem, about a Communist official's return to Catholicism, is released despite protests by the Croatian SUBNOR.
25 April	The Slovenian Writers' Association and the Slovenian Sociological Association publish a proposal for an alternative Slovenian constitution. Authors of the proposal include several prominent intellectual figures, like Veljko Rus, France Bučar, Dimitrij Rupel, Veno Taufer, Milan Apih, Tine Hribar, Peter Jambrek, Janez Menart, and Tone Pavček.
12 May	The Slovenian Peasant Union is formed in a mass meeting in Ljubljana as the first openly non-Communist political association in Yugoslavia. The event is usually considered as the beginning of the Slovenian Spring.
15 May	SFRY minister of defense Admiral Branko Mamula is fired because of his opposition to Milošević. Veljko Kadijević takes his place as the new minister.
31 May – 4 June	The JNA captures Janez Janša and three other persons in Slovenia. Accusations are made about the discovery of a "state secret". The arrests provoke a national outcry in Slovenia. During the so-called Ljubljana trial, a Committee for the Protection of Human Rights is formed, which becomes the central civil society platform in Slovenia.
27 September	Boško Krunić, a representative of League of Communists of Yugoslavia, and Franc Šetinc, a Slovenian member of the Yugoslav Communist Party Politburo, resign due to ethnic conflict between Serbs and Albanians.
4 October	A crowd of people gathers in Bačka Palanka to protest against the provincial government of Vojvodina.
5 October	Under the control of Slobodan Milošević, Mihalj Kertes and 100,000 men from Bačka Palanka and the rest of Serbia enter Novi Sad, the capital of Vojvodina, to support protests against the government of Vojvodina.
6 October	After the JNA refuses to disperse the crowd or protect the parliament building in Novi Sad, the entire parliament of Vojvodina resigns and is replaced with politicians loyal to Milošević. The structure of the Presidency of Yugoslavia changes by effectively giving Serbia 2 votes out of 8.
9 October	Montenegrin police intervene against protesters in Titograd and proclaim a state of emergency. This is seen by Serbia as an act of hostility.
10 October	Raif Dizdarevic, president of SFRY, warns that the crisis in Yugoslavia might lead to "extraordinary conditions". The President declares that the demonstrations against Communist Party leaders in various sections of the country are "negative events" which can lead to "unpredictable consequences".
17 October	Stipe Šuvar attempts to oust Slobodan Milošević from the Yugoslav Central Committee.
November	The number of Presidency members is reduced to 8; the Presidency position for the president of the Presidium of the League of Communists of Yugoslavia is abolished.
17 November	Resignation of the Kosovo provincial government; politicians loyal to Slobodan Milošević are installed. This event triggers the first of many demonstrations by ethnic Albanians. The structure of the Presidency changes again, Serbia now effectively having 3 votes out of 8.
18 November	A massive rally of almost one million people is held in Belgrade in support of Milošević's policies.
19 November	About 100,000 ethnic Albanians, angered by Serbian removal of provincial leaders, march through the capital of Kosovo.
28 November	1,500 Croats protest outside the Yugoslav consulate in Sydney, Australia to coincide with its Republic Day. A consulate worker shoots at and wounds a 16-year-old protester. The consulate is subsequently closed the following week.
31 December	Facing a foreign debt reaching 21 billion US dollars, a 15% unemployment rate, and a 250% rate of inflation, the Yugoslav government of Branko Mikulić resigns.

=== 1989 ===
Date	Event
10 January	Over 100,000 protesters gather in Titograd to protest the regional government of Montenegro. Members resign the next day; the new leadership consists of Momir Bulatović, Milo Đukanović and Svetozar Marović, strongly allied with Milošević. The structure of the Yugoslav Presidency now effectively gives Serbia 4 out of 8 votes (the remaining votes belonging to Bosnia and Herzegovina, Croatia, Macedonia and Slovenia).
11 January	The Slovenian Democratic Union is founded.
16 February	The Social Democratic Union of Slovenia is founded.
20 February	Albanian workers in the Trepca mine (near Kosovska Mitrovica) go on strike.
27 February	The Yugoslav Presidency declares a state of emergency in Kosovo due to Albanian protests.
28 February	Franjo Tuđman made a public appearance in the building of the Writer's Association of Croatia, delivering a speech outlining the political programme of what would become the Croatian Democratic Union.
1 March	Arrest of Azem Vllasi.
4 March	The Serbian Writers Association discusses hate towards Serbs in Croatia, Kosovo and Slovenia. At this meeting Vuk Drašković mentions "Serbian western frontiers".
10 March	The Slovene Christian Social Movement is founded.
16 March	Ante Marković is new prime minister of Yugoslavia, after earlier Slobodan Milošević has rejected that position offered to him by Minister of Defence Veljko Kadijević. BBC will call Marković "Washington's best ally in Yugoslavia"
28 March	With the Serbian change of constitution, Yugoslav provinces Vojvodina and Kosovo have autonomy abolished, but retain a seat in the presidency of Yugoslavia.
8 May	Slobodan Milošević becomes president of Serbia.
8 May	Slovenian opposition parties and the Slovenian Writer's Association issue a joint manifesto, known as the May Declaration, demanding a sovereign and democratic Slovenian nation state. The Declaration is publicly read by the poet Tone Pavček in a mass demonstration on Ljubljana's central Congress Square.
29 May	The Croatian Social Liberal Union is founded.
11 June	The Greens of Slovenia are founded as the first environmentalist party in Yugoslavia.
17 June	Creation of the Croatian Democratic Union in Croatia.
28 June	Addressing perhaps as many as 2,000,000 Serbs, Slobodan Milošević delivers the Gazimestan speech in which he speaks about the possibility of future "armed battles", but also about the fact, that Serbia is a multiethnic country, where every citizen has to be provided with equal rights, no matter the nationality or religion.
1 August	Yugoslavian ambassador to the USA Živorad Kovačević is recalled after Congress votes to condemn human rights abuses in Yugoslavia.
14 September	At a meeting of the Serbian Writers Association in Belgrade, Vuk Drašković appeals for the creation of a Serbian Krajina in Croatia.
17 September	Against federal warnings SR Slovenia amends its constitution in the name of greater autonomy and the right to secede from Yugoslavia. The term "Socialist" is dropped from the republic's official name, and provisions enabling free elections are established.
29 September	Demonstrations take place in Kosovo, Montenegro, Serbia and Vojvodina against the Slovenian constitutional amendments.
20 October	The Presidency of the Central Committee of the Communist Party of Bosnia and Herzegovina discovers actions of the Serbian Secret Service in Bosnian territory.
30 October	Beginning of court proceedings against Azem Vllasi and other Kosovar politicians.
3 November	Police use force during Albanian demonstrations in Kosovo; some demonstrators are killed.
11 November	The Croatian Peasant Party is reformed in Zagreb.
20 November	Slovenia refuses to allow demonstrations by Serbs and Montenegrins in Ljubljana. In line with this decision, Croatia declares that it will not allow people from Serbia and Montenegro travelling to Slovenia for December 1 demonstrations to cross its territory.
27 November	The Democratic Opposition of Slovenia is formed as a unitary platform of all major anti-Communist political parties in Slovenia, chaired by the émigré dissident Jože Pučnik.
29 November	In response to the ban on demonstrations, Serbia begins an economic blockade of Slovenia.
1 December	Fewer than 100 people turn up at a protest in front of the Slovenian Assembly in Ljubljana. The local police forces disperse the crowd.
10 December	Secret meeting of Croatian and Slovenian presidents.
13 December	Ivica Račan becomes president of the Croatian Communist Party against the wishes of the Yugoslav Army.
23 December	Democratic League of Kosovo is founded.
31 December	Slobodan Milošević decides to stop sending electrical power to residents of Croatia. Italian foreign minister Gianni de Michelis calls Croats and Slovenes extremist without any chance to enter Europe outside Yugoslavia.

=== 1990 ===
Date	Event
1 January	Prime Minister Ante Marković's (appointed on 17 March 1989) economic program is launched.
20 January	14th Congress of the League of Communists of Yugoslavia begins at the Sava Centar in Belgrade.
22 January	Slovenian, Croatian and Macedonian delegates abandon the last Congress of the Communist League of Yugoslavia. The Communist Party of Yugoslavia is dissolved.
25 January	More Albanian protests against emergency rule occur in Kosovo. A crowd of 40,000 people is dispersed with water cannons and tear gas.
26 January	The Yugoslav Defense Minister Veljko Kadijević requests an increase in military personnel stationed in Slovenia. The JNA creates a military plan of action for territories with ethnically mixed populations (Bosnia and Herzegovina and Croatia).
29 January	General strike in Kosovo.
31 January	The Yugoslav Presidency decides to send the JNA into Kosovo to restore order.
3 February	The Democratic Party is founded in Serbia.
14 February	The Croatian Parliament passes amendments to Croatia's constitution, allowing multi-party elections.
16 February	Zdravko Mustač, chief of the UDBA, states that the HDZ would launch a pogrom of Serbs 48 hours after election victory.
17 February	Formation of the Serb Democratic Party takes place in Knin, Croatia.
4 March	A protest of 50,000 Serbs from Croatia and Serbia takes place on Petrova Gora "against Franjo Tuđman and the Ustaše", demanding the "territorial integrity of Yugoslavia".
10 March	The BBC reports on the deteriorating situation between Croats and Serbs and the tensions arising after Serbian demands on Petrova Gora.
17 March	Duško Čubrilović, of Serb ethnicity, tries to assassinate Franjo Tuđman at an election rally in Benkovac.
21 March	Serbs around Zadar organise nightly checkpoints, controlling vehicles and even buses passing through.
22 March	Kosovo student poisoning occurs.
22 March	The Serbian Parliament adopted Milošević' blueprint for Kosovo: The Programme for Achieving Peace, Freedom, Equality and Prosperity.
23 March	The Slovenian Democratic Opposition issues a proposal for an alternative Slovenian Constitution. The proposal, authored by Peter Jambrek, France Bučar and Tine Hribar, clearly envisions an independent democratic state.
26 March	Serbian leadership meets to assess the situation in Yugoslavia and agrees that war in Croatia and Bosnia and Herzegovina is inevitable.
30 March	Meeting of the League of Communists of Yugoslavia without members from Bosnia and Herzegovina, Croatia, Slovenia and Macedonia.
3 April	Members of the Croatian police are withdrawn from Kosovo.
8 April	The DEMOS coalition wins the first multiparty elections in Slovenia. Milan Kučan of the former Communist Party is elected President of the Republic, while the Christian Democrat Lojze Peterle becomes Prime Minister.
22 April	First multiparty elections in Croatia. The winner is the Croatian Democratic Union (HDZ) which takes 193 out of 365 parliament places. The Serb Democratic Party won the majority in towns such as Benkovac, Korenica, Knin and others.
26 April	Meeting between Borisav Jović, future president of the Presidency, and minister of defence Veljko Kadijević, who reports that the JNA is ready to engage in Slovenia and Croatia.
13 May	A large riot breaks out at the Dinamo Zagreb–Red Star Belgrade match at Dinamo's Maksimir stadium.
17 May	The JNA begins to disarm territorial defense of Slovenia and Croatia, but Slovenian refusal prevents disarming in Slovenia.
26 May	Creation of the SDA in Bosnia and Herzegovina.
30 May	The Croatian parliament elects Franjo Tuđman as president and Stipe Mesić as prime minister. The Serb Democratic Party of Jovan Rašković breaks off all relations with the Croatian parliament.
30 May	In the newspaper Svet, Vojislav Šešelj says: "The border of our Serbia is not Drina. Drina is a Serbian river which runs through the middle of Serbia".
3 June	The Yugoslav anthem and national team are booed at Zagreb's Maksimir stadium during an international exhibition match against the Netherlands.
6 June	The Parliament of the city of Knin proposes creating an Association of the municipalities of Northern Dalmatia and Lika.
8 June	The JNA creates new brigades in the regions of Zagreb, Knin, Banja Luka and Herzegovina.
27 June	Creation of the Association of the municipalities of Northern Dalmatia and Lika in Knin.
28 June	Slobodan Milošević tells the Yugoslav president of the Presidency Borisav Jović that he thinks that: "the breakup of Croatia needs to be done in such a way that the Association of the municipalities of Northern Dalmatia and Lika stay on our side of the border".
29 June	In Croatia, the term "Socialist" is dropped from the republic's official name and a temporary new flag and coat of arms are adopted.
30 June	Vladimir Šeks, vice president of Croatian parliament, says that SFRY needs to become a confederation.
1 July	Milan Babić speaks in the village Kosovo near Knin (Croatia) about the future creation of SAO Krajina.
1 July	The Parliament of Slovenia votes to declare independence (but independence is not proclaimed).
2 July	The Parliament of Kosovo declares Kosovo republic with rights and powers identical to other 6 republics. In response the declaration, the Parliament of Serbia abolishes the Parliament of Kosovo.
20 July	The Parliament of Serbia changes its election laws to allow first multiparty elections.
25 July	The Parliament of Croatia votes for a series of constitutional changes. References to communism are removed from government institutions and symbols, and the country's official name becomes the Republic of Croatia. Vladimir Šeks speaks about the confederation on 30 June.
25 July	Representatives of political and national organizations of Serbian people in Croatia met in Srb, forming the "Serbian Assembly" and creating its executive body, the Serbian National Council, also proclaiming the Declaration of Sovereignty and Autonomy of Serbs in Croatia. Declaration stated that Serbs in Croatia have the right to hold a referendum on the autonomy.
26 July	The Croatian News Agency is established.
30 July	Members of HDZ are attacked in Berak near Vukovar.
31 July	At the first meeting of the Serbian National Council in Croatia, a decision is made that a referendum is needed on Serbian autonomy in Croatia, and its date was set for August 19, 1990. After receiving this news, the Croatian government bans such a referendum. Milan Babić is elected president of the council.
31 July	The Parliament of Bosnia and Herzegovina changes its constitution to officially become the home of Bosniaks, Serbs and Croats.
5 August	Creation of the Serbian Democratic Party in Bosnia and Herzegovina.
13 August	A delegation of Serbs from Knin under the presidency of Milan Babić comes to Belgrade, meeting with the Yugoslav president of the Presidency Borisav Jović and with the Yugoslav minister of interior Petar Gračanin. Borisav Jović declares that municipalities will decide if they will stay in Yugoslavia or not.
17 August	Serbs of "Krajina", accusing Croatian authorities of discrimination, raise barricades on key roads around Knin, beginning the Log Revolution. In Benkovac, the Police of the Republic of Croatia prevented the Serbian direct vote of separation. The Serbs raised barricades in incident known as the Log Revolution. The revolt is explained by the Serbs with words that they are "terrorized [by Croatian government] and [fight for] more cultural, language and education rights". Serbian newspaper "Večernje Novosti" writes that "2.000.000 Serbs [are] ready to go to Croatia to fight". On the other side the Western diplomats are saying that The Serbian media is inflaming passions and Croatian government is saying "We knew about the scenario to create confusion in Croatia..."
18 August	Creation of the Croatian Democratic Union in Bosnia and Herzegovina.
19 August	The Serb referendum in Croatia sees 97.7% people of the regions they held it in voting in favour of Serb autonomy in Croatia.
20 August	The Yugoslav government and the JNA demand that Croatia not take action against Serbs rebels in so-called Krajina. At the finals of the FIBA World Championship, Vlade Divac took a Croatian flag from a spectator and stamped on it.
24 August	Croatian president Franjo Tuđman asks for a meeting with Serbian president Slobodan Milošević.
27 August	Registration of new political parties in Serbia permitted.
30 August	Croatian constitutional court abolishes (de jure) the "Association of municipalities from northern Dalmatia and Lika", declaring it unconstitutional.
September	Albanian members of the dissolved Kosovo parliament meet clandestinely and adopt an alternative constitution.
3 September	Albanians begin general strike in Kosovo.
3 September	Ivan Zvonimir Čičak and Marinko Božić create the Croatian Patriotic Organization in Herzegovina. Because the black uniforms of the members of the organization appear similar to those of Croatian Quisling forces during World War II, the Serbian Press calls them Ustaše.
7 September	Josip Boljkovac, Croatian minister of internal affairs, presents an ultimatum to rebels from the Krajina region to stop all actions against the constitution of Croatia and to relinquish their arms to the government of Croatia by noon on 12 September.
9 September	The Serb Democratic Party demands protection of the Yugoslav Presidency.
12 September	Serbian radio in Knin asks citizens to stop returning arms to the government of Croatia.
13 September	Massacre in Polat (village in Kosovo) committed by Serbian forces.
18 September	Failed "coup" among Bosniaks Party of Democratic Action.
19 September	The Parliament of Bosnia and Herzegovina votes to stay within the SFRY.
26 September	Serbs from Pakrac, Petrinja and Sisak (in Croatia) begin to block road traffic.
28 September	The Constitution of Serbia is revised: the autonomy of Vojvodina and Kosovo is revoked but their members in the Presidency of Yugoslavia retain their positions. The word "Socialist" is removed from the Republic of Serbia.
30 September	Serbian National Council in Croatia proclaimed positive results of the previously held referendum (which has been declared illegal by Croatia) for Serbian autonomy inside Croatia, which was still within Yugoslavia.
1 October	The Serbian National Council in Croatia formally proclaims the creation of Serbian political autonomy in Croatia, within Yugoslavia.
1 October	George H. W. Bush, in a meeting with the Yugoslav president of the Presidency, gives full support to Yugoslavia.
2 October	Croatian Serbs declare their autonomy on vaguely worded referendum on Serbian autonomy conducted throughout Yugoslavia. Croatia's government has repeatedly said that the Serbs' referendum is illegal.
3 October	Croatia and Slovenia make an offer to the Yugoslav Presidency for the creation of a Yugoslav confederation.
4 October	The Slovenian Parliament abolishes 27 Yugoslav laws on Slovenian territory.
11 October	The Vojvodina oil company Naftagas takes control of Croatian oil company propriety in the self-proclaimed Serbian Autonomous Oblast of Krajina. In Zagreb the statue of Josip Jelačić is returned to Republic Square and its name is restored to Ban Jelačić Square.
13 October	Representatives of main political and national organizations and institutions of Serbian people in Bosnia and Herzegovina met in Banja Luka and created Serbian National Council of Bosnia and Herzegovina.
16 October	In a Yugoslav Presidency meeting Croatia and Slovenia again demand the creation of a Yugoslav confederation. Representatives from all other republics vote against the proposition.
17 October	Croatia played the United States in its first international football match.
23 October	Serbian parliament votes for taxes on goods from Croatia and Slovenia.
26 October	Slobodan Milošević asks for military actions only against Croatia and "only" in territory where there are Serbs.
18 November	First multiparty election in Bosnia and Herzegovina. The Party of Democratic Action (SDA) (party of Bosnian Muslims) receives 86 seats (35%), the Serbian Democratic Party (SDP) 72 (29%), and the Croatian Democratic Union (HDZ) 44 (18%). In the Bosnia and Herzegovina Presidency the SDA receives 3 seats and the SDP 2.
22 November	Meeting between Croatian and Slovenian presidents about future independence.
25 November	VMRO–DPMNE wins the first multiparty elections in the Republic of Macedonia with 37 seats in parliament. Communists receive only 31 seats.
28 November	Janez Drnovšek (the Slovenian president of the Yugoslav Presidency until May 1990) and the president of the Yugoslav Presidency Borisav Jović hold a meeting in which Slovenia is given a green light for leaving Yugoslavia.
29 November	Arkan of paramilitary Serb Volunteer Guard is arrested in Croatia, but is soon released.
3 December	Strongly divided between priests which support or oppose Slobodan Milošević, the Serbian Orthodox Church chooses Pavle, Bishop of Raška and Prizren in Kosovo as its new Patriarch.
7 December	The Yugoslav minister of defense Veljko Kadijević, speaking on Belgrade television, attacks the current Croatian leadership for recreating fascism and for genocide against Serbs.
9 December	Slobodan Milošević of the Socialist Party of Serbia wins the first Serbian multiparty election for president with 65.35% of the vote.
9 December	The League of Communists of Montenegro wins the first Montenegro multiparty elections.
21 December	In Knin, the Serbian National Council proclaims the creation of Serbian Autonomous Oblast of Krajina, covering municipalities in the regions of Northern Dalmatia and Lika, in south-western Croatia, within Yugoslavia. The same month, Babić became the President of the Temporary Executive Council of the SAO Krajina.
22 December	The Croatian Parliament votes for a new constitution according to which Croatia is defined as a "national state of the Croatian nation and a state of members of other nations or minorities who are citizens". Removing the Serbs' name from the constitution creates an outcry among the Serb minority in Croatia. Parliament visitors during vote include Milan Kučan president of Slovenia and Alija Izetbegović president of Bosnia and Herzegovina.
23 December	The Socialist Party of Serbia receives 192 out of 250 seats in the Serbian Parliament.
23 December	Momir Bulatović, having received his position after the January coup, is elected president of Montenegro with 76.9% of the vote.
23 December	In the Slovenian independence referendum, 88.5% of the overall electorate (94.8% of votes), with the turnout of 93.3%, supported independence of the country.
26 December	Serbia takes 1.8 billion US dollars (2.5 billion Deutsche Mark) in local currency (Yugoslav dinar) from the Yugoslav Central Bank. Under pressure from the other republics and the World Bank 1.5 billion Deutsche Mark are later returned.
31 December	The Constitutional court of Croatia declares that SAO Krajina does not exist in a legal sense.
31 December	Yugoslav industrial output falls 18.2% in 1990.

=== 1991 ===
Date	Event
4 January	The Croatian government creates a defense council.
4 January	Creation of Krajina police forces.
4 January	Veljko Kadijević, Yugoslav minister of defense, demands from Yugoslav president of presidency Borisav Jović that nations and not republics vote for staying in or leaving Yugoslavia.
7 January	A group of political leaders of local Serbs from eastern regions of Croatia decided to create a regional political body, the Serbian National Council of Slavonia, Baranja and Western Syrmia.
9 January	Yugoslav president of the Presidency Borisav Jović demands that the Presidency vote for use of the JNA against Croatia and Slovenia. All 3 Presidency members under Serbian control (Kosovo, Serbia and Vojvodina) and the member from Montenegro vote for the use of force, but members of the Presidency from the other republics (Bosnia and Herzegovina, Croatia, Macedonia and Slovenia) vote against the use of force.
10 January	After a meeting of the Yugoslav Presidency with the JNA, the army is authorized to take weapons from "paramilitary forces".
10 January	Because of his vote on 9 January, Radovan Karadžić demands the resignation of Bogić Bogićević, a Bosnian Serb elected in a 25 June 1989 referendum to represent Bosnia and Herzegovina in the Yugoslav Presidency.
15 January	Veljko Kadijević declares that the Serbs of Croatia are relinquishing their weapons, but Croats are not.
January	The SAO Krajina established the "Regional Secretariat for Internal Affairs" in Knin, and Milan Martić was appointed Secretary of Internal Affairs. The government of Croatia was informed that the Croatian police would no longer be considered as having authority within SAO Krajina.
24 January	The Croatian constitution declares that the Yugoslav Presidency decision of 10 January is illegal and that Croatia must protect itself and its citizens.
February	Council of Europe has voted that, to join Europe Yugoslavia would have to resolve its crisis peacefully and hold elections for the Federal Parliament.
21 February	The Slovenian parliament approves legislation to take over banking and defense from the Yugoslav central government.
21 February	After receiving news of the Slovenian parliament's decision to start legal actions for independence and for the possible creation of new union of independent states, the Croatian parliament makes a similar decision.
22 February	The Parliament of Pakrac municipality, with a relative majority of Serbs, votes to enter Krajina.
22 February	"Armed Serbs in Pakrac took control of the police station and disarmed 16 Croatian policemen".
26 February	The Serbian national council of Baranja, Western Syrmia and Slavonia votes that if Croatia leaves Yugoslavia, then the territory under council control will separate from Croatia.
28 February	The Serbian national council of SAO Krajina votes that Krajina will stay in Yugoslavia and expresses the wish for a peaceful separation of Croatia and SAO Krajina.
1 March	Pakrac clash – Pakrac police station was regained by the Croatian police because of a counterattack. The first shots of the Yugoslav wars were fired in Pakrac on this day.
3 March	Pakrac clash – The Yugoslav army is deployed to stop fighting between Serbian villagers (who have seized control of a police station in Pakrac) and a Croatian police unit which has restored control of the police station and town. Although no one is killed during the fighting this event marks the beginning of the Croatian War of Independence.
9 March	Beginning of large student demonstrations in Belgrade. The Presidency authorizes the JNA to protect important buildings but on this pretext the JNA also attacks demonstrators.
12 March	Meeting of Yugoslav presidency in JNA Headquarters during demonstrations. The JNA demands that a war situation be declared. The vote replicates that of 9 January, with presidency members under Milošević control voting for war and others against (4:4). After the vote important members of the Yugoslav army go on "diplomatic" missions to France, the UK and the USSR.
15 March	Speaking on Serbian State Television, Slobodan Milošević declares: "Yugoslavia does not exist any more".
17 March	After the Serbian resolution is defeated in a Yugoslav Presidency vote, Slobodan Milošević orders the mobilization of Serbian special forces and declares "Serbia will not recognize any decisions by the Presidency of Yugoslavia".
20 March	200 Serbian writers, film makers and actors sign a petition against Slobodan Milošević because he has "opted for a policy of war".
29 March	Plitvice Lakes incident – Serb Krajina police under Mile Martić take control of the Plitvice Lakes National Park.
31 March	Plitvice Lakes incident – On Easter Sunday, Croatian police forces move in and are ambushed by Serbian rebels. During the firefight a Croatian policeman Josip Jović becomes the first victim of the Croatian War of Independence.
1 April	Croatian police forces retake the Plitvice lakes, and 15 minutes of gunfire ensue.
2 April	Yugoslav People's Army commands the Croatian police to evacuate Plitvice, to which they comply.
2 April	In Titova Korenica, President of "Krajina" Milan Babic proclaims the union of this Croatian region under control of rebel Serbs with Serbia.
2 April	Beginning of a Zagreb military court hearing against Croatian minister of defence Martin Špegelj for the Croatian rebellion against the Yugoslavia army. The strongest evidence comes from the Špegelj Tapes. Under Croatian popular pressure the trial is postponed and Špegelj escapes to Austria.
April	Future Croatian defense minister Gojko Šušak organized and participated in firing three shoulder-launched Armbrust missiles into Borovo Selo in an attempt to fan the flames of the war.
1 May	Borovo Selo killings – Four Croatian policemen entered Borovo Selo and tried to replace the Yugoslav flag in the village with a Croatian one. The police were killed or taken hostage by the local Serbs and later mutilated by having their eyes and ears cut.
2 May	Borovo Selo killings – A bus load of Croatian policemen (150) seeking to reassert control ran headlong into an ambush, leaving 15 dead (12 Croats and 3 Serbs) and over 20 wounded. The Yugoslav army arrives and ends the combat, creating a border line between territory under Croatian and rebel control.
6 May	Large anti-Yugoslav demonstration in Split ends in violence. The tanks of Yugoslav Army with soldiers of mostly non-Croatian and non-Serbian nationality were sent on the streets. Sašo Gešovski, the soldier of Macedonian origin, was shot dead.
12 May	Serbs from Croatian territory under the control of Serbs vote on a referendum for union with Serbia.
16 May	Acting against the Yugoslav constitution, Serbian representative Borisav Jović demands a vote to prevent Stjepan Mesić from becoming the president of the Yugoslav presidency. Because of 3 Serbian votes and 1 of Montenegro Mesić does not become president.
19 May	Referendum held for independence in Croatia. With 86% of all Croatian voters turning out, 94.17% vote in favor of independence.
25 June	Croatia makes a constitutional decision about independence.
25 June	Slovenia declares independence.
26 June	Last day of Croatian and Slovenian deadline for new inter-republic agreements about Yugoslavia.
27 June	Start of Ten-Day War in Slovenia, which lasts until 6 July 1991.
30 June	At the demand of western officials Serbia stops its block on Stjepan Mesić's election as the Yugoslav president of Presidency.
7 July	The Brioni Agreement ceases hostilities in Slovenia. Slovenia and Croatia agree to freeze their independence for a three-month period. The Yugoslav People's Army agrees to withdraw from Slovenia.
28 July	Concert Yutel for Peace held in Sarajevo.
31 July	Milan Babic, president of insurgent Serbs in Krajina, rejects peace proposal by the ministers of the European Community.
21–22 August	The Government of Macedonia executes a secret plan for confiscation of all federal documents about Yugoslav Army recruits on Macedonian territory.
25 August	Beginning of the Siege of Vukovar.
27 August	The European Economic Community sets up the Badinter Commission to consider and hand down legal opinions on fifteen questions concerning the conflict in Yugoslavia.
29 August	The women's organization Bedem ljubavi starts protests around Yugoslav People's Army barracks calling for Croats and other ethnic groups to be released from conscription.
3 September	Four Bosniaks were ambushed by a group of Serb nationalists as their car was passing through the village of Kravica near Bratunac, in eastern Bosnia and Herzegovina. Two Bosniaks were killed, while the other two survived with injuries. The ambush aroused panic among the population and was one of the earliest serious episodes of ethnically motivated violence in Bosnia and Herzegovina.
8 September	Macedonia votes for independence. The turnout of the voters was 75%, and 95% of them voted for independence. Today this day is celebrated as independence day.
15 September	Supreme Command Headquarters of the Yugoslav armed forces calls for partial mobilization, in violation of the Yugoslav constitution.
September	Houses belonging to Croats were torched in Hrvatska Dubica and the neighbouring village of Cerovljani, and widespread looting was committed by the TO, the Milicija Krajine, and the JNA as well as by local Serbs. Local Croats were detained and subjected to mistreatment and were also used as live shields by the Serb forces. Serbs moved into the houses which the fleeing Croats had left.
19 September	Serbian RAM Plan for war in Bosnia and Herzegovina is revealed and discussed in the Parliament of Bosnia and Herzegovina. Yugoslav prime minister Ante Marković confirms that Slobodan Milošević has ordered the Yugoslav army to give weapons to the territorial defense of Bosanska Krajina, which is under the control of Radovan Karadžić.
25 September	Macedonia declares independence.
26 September	The Serbian parliament is informed that the response to the partial mobilization is very poor because only 50% of those called have shown up.
30 September	Referendum held for independence in Kosovo. A majority is in favor of independence. Serbia does not accept it.
7 October	JNA aircraft fire rockets at the Banski Dvori.
7 October	The Croatian Parliament votes for independence from Yugoslavia.
8 October	Croatia] declares independence from Yugoslavia.
13 October	Radovan Karadžić tells Momčilo Mandić: "In just a couple of days, Sarajevo will be gone and there will be five hundred thousand dead, in one month Muslims will be annihilated in Bosnia and Herzegovina."
15 October	Radovan Karadžić tells Miodrag Davidović and Luka Karadžić: "In the first place no one of their leadership (Bosniaks) would stay alive, in three, four hours they'd all be killed. They wouldn't have a chance to survive at all."
16, 18 October	Croat individuals killed 100–120 civilian Serb residents of Gospić. The incident became known as the "Gospić massacre".
20 October	40 local civilians, almost exclusively Croat, were killed.
21 October	Serbian paramilitary forces in Croatia commit the Baćin massacre.
26 October	Last Yugoslav Army troops leave Slovenia, departing from the port of Koper.
31 October	The "Convoy of Peace", carrying delegates including Yugoslavian President Stipe Mesić and Croatian Premier Franjo Gregurić, arrives in Dubrovnik amid a siege of the city by the JNA.
10 November	Bosnian Serbs vote on a referendum to stay in the common state with Serbia.
18–21 November	Vukovar massacre at Ovčara.
2 December	President of Macedonia sends an official letter to the presidents of the foreign governments asking for recognition of the independence of Macedonia. Immediately after that Greece starts military provocations on the Macedonian-Greece border.
9 December	The Badinter Commission publishes its first opinion, deciding that the SFRY "is in the process of dissolution."
11 December	Ukraine recognizes Croatia.
12–13 December	Serbian paramilitary forces in Croatia commit Voćin massacre.
16 December	Resignation of Dragutin Zelenovic, Serbian prime minister and former member of the Yugoslav Presidency from Vojvodina.
17 December	Yugoslav prime minister Ante Marković resigns, refusing to accept a federal budget in which the Yugoslav army will receive 86% of all funds.
19 December	Iceland recognizes Croatia; Germany announces that it will recognize Croatia on January 15, 1992, with or without the rest of the European Community.
23 December	Germany becomes the first major power to recognize Croatia and Slovenia as independent states.
23 December	The Croatian government launches a transitional currency under the name Croatian dinar.
24 December	The Yugoslav central bank launches a new Yugoslav dinar.

=== 1992 ===
Date	Event
3–6 January	Sarajevo Agreement: a ceasefire agreement between Croatia on one side and Serbia and Serbian rebels on the other side – holds. Around 10,000 UN soldiers are to arrive shortly to prevent future warfare in Croatian territory.
7 January	A Yugoslav Mig aircraft attacks and destroys 1 of 2 EC monitoring mission helicopters with 5 crew members on board. Soon afterward the Yugoslav defence minister resigns.
9 January	Bosnian Serbs declare the establishment of their own republic, effective from the date of international recognition of Bosnia. Territory of the new republic includes wherever Serbs in Bosnia and Herzegovina are in the majority "and all other regions where the Serbian people represent a minority due to the Second World War genocide".
15 January	The European Community recognizes Slovenia and Croatia.
20 January	Mr. Koljević, a leader of the Bosnian Serbs, talks with a newspaper about his discussion with Croatian president Franjo Tuđman about a Bosnia and Herzegovina "transformation".
27 January	The Montenegro Parliament votes for a referendum to see if citizens still support the Yugoslav federation.
8–23 February	Croatia and Slovenia compete at the 1992 Winter Olympics. Rump Yugoslavia also participates.
22 February	The Macedonian newspaper Nova Makedonija published the Agreement between Macedonian Government and the Yugoslav Army for the ongoing peaceful withdrawal of the Yugoslav Army from the territory of Republic of Macedonia. According to this Agreement the last Yugoslav soldier should leave Macedonian territory on 15 April 1992. The withdrawal of the Yugoslav Army from Macedonia started with the beginning of the winter of 1991/92.
21 February	United Nations Security Council Resolution 743 sets up a Protection Force (UNPROFOR) mandated to create three IJN Protected Areas (UNPAs) in Croatia.
29 February	A referendum on independence is held in Bosnia. A majority of Muslims and Croats vote in favor, but a majority of Serbs boycott the vote.
1 March	On the first day after the referendum a wedding groom's father, Nikola Gardovic, an ethnic Serb, is killed by Ramiz Delalic, an ethnic Bosniak, at a Serbian wedding. Gardovic is considered by many Serbs as the first casualty of the Bosnian war.
2 March	Kiro Gligorov, the president of Macedonia, speaks publicly about the agreement between the Republic of Macedonia and the Yugoslav army for its peaceful withdrawal from Macedonia.
3 March	Bosnia and Herzegovina declare independence.
17 March	The last Yugoslav soldier left Macedonian territory.
23 March	Vienna agreement between Croatia and Serbia.
1 April	The Serbian Volunteer Guard, commanded by gangster Željko Ražnatović Arkan, takes Bijeljina.
3 April	Yugoslav army and Serbian paramilitary forces battle against Bosniak and Croat forces of Bosnia and Herzegovina around Bosanski Brod and Kupres.
5 April	Bosnia and Herzegovina president Alija Izetbegović orders mobilization of the national guard and police reserve.
7 April	The EC and the United States recognize Bosnia. An "Assembly of the Serbian Nation of Bosnia-Hercegovina" proclaims an independent Bosnian Serb Republic, later named the "Republika Srpska".
10 April	The Serbian Volunteer Guard takes Zvornik in Bosnia and Herzegovina. The Yugoslav army refuses to protect the local Muslim population against Serb guerrilla attacks until they surrender their weapons.
16 April	The government of Yugoslavia under Serbian control is warned by the United States to stop its assault on Bosnia and Herzegovina or be suspended from international organizations.
27 April	Formal end of the Socialist Federal Republic of Yugoslavia with the proclamation of new Constitution approved by "Federal assembly" for the Federal Republic of Yugoslavia (FRY), consisting of Serbia and Montenegro. At the time of this vote 10,000 Socialist Federal Republic of Yugoslavia soldiers still remain in Bosnia and Herzegovina.

== FR Yugoslavia ==
=== 1992 ===
Date	Event
22 May	Bosnia and Herzegovina, Croatia and Slovenia become members of the United Nations.
30 May	United Nations Security Council Resolution 757 imposed a wide range of economic and political sanctions against Serbia and Montenegro.
26–27 August	International Conference on the Former Yugoslavia (ICFY), London. Co- Chairmen of the ICFY's Steering Committee were Vance, representing the UN, and Lord Owen, former British Foreign Secretary Dr David Owen, representing the EC Presidency.
14 September	United Nations Security Council Resolution 776 approved the expansion of UNPROFOR into Bosnia, where it was mandated to facilitate the provision of humanitarian aid throughout the region by protecting convoys run by the UN High Commissioner for Refugees (UNHCR). UNPROFOR was also intended to protect convoys of released detainees.
19 September	United Nations Security Council Resolution 777 determined that the Federal Republic of Yugoslavia cannot automatically continue the United Nations membership of the former Socialist Federal Republic of Yugoslavia.
9 October	United Nations Security Council Resolution 781 introduced a No-fly zone (NFZ) for all military flights over Bosnia.
20 October	The last Yugoslav Army troops leave Croatia.

=== 1993 ===
Date	Event
11–12 January	Vance and Lord Owen produced 'Vance-Owen peace plan' creating 10 largely autonomous provinces based on ethnic mix, geographical and historical factors, communications and economic stability.
25 March	President Izetbegović signed all documents relating to Vance-Owen peace plan.
16 April	Croatian forces commit the Ahmići massacre in Lašva Valley.
1 May	Thorvald Stoltenberg, a former Norwegian Foreign Minister, replaced Vance as UN Representative and co-chairman of ICFY.
1–2 May	Summit meeting in Athens between all Bosnian leaders and Croatian and Serbian Presidents. Karadzic signed Vance-Owen peace plan.
6 May	United Nations Security Council Resolution 824 declared that the Bosnian capital, Sarajevo, and also Tuzla, Zepa, Gorazde, Bihac, Srebrenica and their surrounding areas, should be treated as safe areas by all parties concerned and should be free from armed attacks.
15–16 May	Bosnian Serb referendum on Vance-Owen peace plan and independence: plan rejected (96 per cent against).
22 May	Foreign Ministers of Britain, US, Russia, France and Spain agreed Joint Action Programme.
25 May	United Nations Security Council Resolution 827 established the International Criminal Tribunal for the former Yugoslavia, tasked with prosecuting those accused of serious violations of international and humanitarian law.
4 June	United Nations Security Council Resolution 836 mandated UNPROFOR to defend the UN safe areas and occupy key points on the ground in those areas.
19–20 June	Referendum in 'Republic of Serb Krajina' on unification with other Serbs: with a 98.6% turnout, 93.8% of the total number of voters voted in favor.
24 August	Croatian Democratic Community (HDZ) proclaimed the Mostar-based 'Croatian Community of Herceg-Bosna' a republic.
27–29 August	Bosnian Serbs and Bosnian Croats accepted new Owen-Stoltenberg proposals on a union of three ethnic republics in Bosnia.
29 September	Bosnian Assembly voted for the Owen-Stoltenberg proposal, but only if territories seized by force were returned.
29 October	New Bosnian Government: Haris Silajdzic appointed Prime Minister.
3 December	Yasushi Akashi, a former Japanese diplomat, became UN Secretary-General's Special Representative for the former Yugoslavia.
16 December	Britain and other EU States established diplomatic relations with the Republic of Macedonia.

=== 1994 ===
Date	Event
21 January	Milan Martić stated that he would "speed up the process of unification" and "pass on the baton to our all-Serbian leader Slobodan Milošević".
5 February	Bosnian Serb mortar attack on Sarajevo marketplace resulted in numerous civilian deaths and casualties.
7 February	EU Foreign Ministers backed use of NATO airpower if necessary to lift Bosnian Serb siege of Sarajevo.
9 February	At UN request, NATO agreed to authorise air strikes, declared 20 km total exclusion zone around Sarajevo and required Bosnian Serbs to withdraw heavy weapons from zone or place them under UN control within 10 days; also called on Bosnian Government to place heavy weapons in Sarajevo under UN control. Agreement between 'RS' and Bosnian Government to a ceasefire in Sarajevo, negotiated by Lieutenant-General Sir Michael Rose, then Commander of UN forces in Bosnia.
17 February	Russian initiative secured Bosnian Serb cooperation in withdrawing heavy weapons from Sarajevo.
1 March	In Washington, Silajdzic, Croatian Foreign Minister Mate Granic and Bosnian Croat leader, Kresimir Zubak, signed framework Federation agreement between Bosnian Muslims ('Bosniacs') and Bosnian Croats, as well as a preliminary agreement on a confederation between that Federation and the Republic of Croatia.
24 March	'RS' Assembly rejected joining Muslim-Croat Federation and demanded that sanctions against Serbs should be lifted.
29 March	Agreement on ceasefire in Krajina signed at Russian Embassy in Zagreb by Croatian Government and Krajina Serbs.
31 March	An agreement was signed in Zagreb between the Serb rebels and the Republic of Croatia on a cease-fire at the line of contact of the Krajina and the Croatian forces. The agreement came into effect on April 4, 1994.
11 April	NATO planes bombed Bosnian Serb armoured vehicles in response to resumption of shelling of Gorazde.
22 April	NATO authorised use of air strikes against Bosnian Serb heavy weapons within 20 km exclusion zone around Gorazde unless: there was an immediate ceasefire; Bosnian Serb forces pulled back 3 km from Gorazde centre; humanitarian convoys and medical evacuations were permitted. NATO also authorised immediate use of air strikes against Bosnian Serbs in the event of attacks against any UN safe area, or if Bosnian Serb heavy weapons come within 20 km exclusion zones around these areas.
22–23 April	Akashi held talks with President Milosevic and Bosnian Serb leadership in Belgrade. Reached six-point ceasefire agreement on Gorazde, with Bosnian Serbs agreeing to immediate ceasefire; Deployment of UNPROFOR in 3 km radius of centre and on both sides of the River Drina; safe medical evacuation; freedom of movement for UNPROFOR and humanitarian organisations.
26 April	First meeting of 'Contact Group', comprising representatives of Britain, Russia, US, France and Germany, held in London. The Group was set up as a forum to present a united front to the warring parties and concentrated on securing agreement on a territorial allocation as the first step in a political settlement. It produced a map for the parties to consider. British Embassy opened in Sarajevo.
11 May	Vienna Agreement between Bosniacs and Croats set Bosniac/Croat Federation at 58 per cent of Bosnian territory; divided Federation into eight cantons; and determined composition of interim federal government.
13 May	Foreign Ministers of France, Russia, Britain, US and EU Troika, plus Vice- President of European Commission, met in Geneva. They called for four-month cessation of hostilities and requested negotiations within two weeks, under aegis of Contact Group, on the basis of territorial division of 51 per cent for the Bosnian Federation and 49 per cent for the Bosnian Serbs.
31 May	Bosnian Assembly elected Zubak (Bosnian Croat) and Ejup Ganic (Bosnian Muslim) as president and vice-president of Federation until federal elections, scheduled after six months. Assembly also endorsed Washington and Vienna Agreements (see 1 March and 11 May).
10 June	Draft Memorandum of Understanding on the EU administration of Mostar initialled ad referendum by enlarged EU Troika and Bosnian and Bosnian Croat sides.
8 July	Justice Richard Goldstone of South Africa approved as Chief Prosecutor for International Criminal Tribunal for the Former Yugoslavia.
20 July	Bosnian Serb Declaration handed to Contact Group in Geneva. Stated that: they could not take position on Contact Group peace plan because constitutional arrangements for Bosnia were not fully elaborated, and further work was required on map. But it could serve as basis for further negotiations.
23 July	Hans Koschnick from Germany inaugurated as EU administrator of Mostar.
3 August	'RS' Assembly rejected Contact Group peace plan.
4 August	President Milosevic announced decision to sever political and economic ties with Bosnian Serbs because of their rejection of the peace plan.
20 August	'RS President' Karadzic and 'RSK President' Milan Martić signed a proposal for the unification of 'RS' and 'RSK'.
11 November	US announced it would stop enforcing arms embargo on Bosnian Government and Bosniac/Croat Federation.
21 November	NATO bombed Udbina airport in 'RSK' following air attacks by Krajina- based Serbian aircraft on the Bihac region. Intense diplomatic and military activity ensued, including UN Security Council Presidential statements, attempts to broker a ceasefire, continued Krajina Serbian attacks on Bihac, NATO close air support and Bosnian Serb detention of UNPROFOR personnel.
2 December	Croatian Government and 'RSK' authorities signed an economic agreement.
31 December	Bosnian and 'RS' Governments signed a four-month Cessation of Hostilities Agreement.

=== 1995 ===
Date	Event
12 January	Croatia said she would not renew UNPROFOR mandate after 31 March. UNPROFOR would then have three months to withdraw.
30 January	Zagreb-4 plan presented to Croatian Government and Knin-based 'RSK' leadership. Drawn up by EU, UN, US and Russian representatives, the plan aimed to bring a political settlement to the conflict in Croatia. 'RSK' refused to consider it until guarantees were received of UNPROFOR's presence beyond 31 March. President Milosevic refused to receive Z4 ambassadors.
5 February	US convened a meeting in Munich in support of the Bosniac/Croat Federation. A nine-point aid plan was announced and Muslim and Croat officials agreed to the appointment of an arbiter for Muslim/Croat disputes.
8 February	'RSK' Assembly suspended all economic and political negotiations with Croatia until she reversed her decision on terminating the UNPROFOR mandate.
13 February	International Criminal Tribunal indicted 21 Serbs for genocide. 'RS' President refused to allow extradition of anyone. 'FRY' ruled that alleged 'FRY' war criminals must be tried there.
20 February	'RS' and 'RSK' announced a Joint Defence Council.
6 March	EU adopted negotiating mandate for Trade and Cooperation Agreement between the EU and Croatia, but made start of the negotiations dependent on continued UN presence in Croatia.
8–10 March	Zubak and Ganic, in Bonn, signed the Petersburg Agreement on the implementation of the Bosniac/Croat Federation.
12 March	President Tudjman announced that a reconfigured UN force could remain on Croatian soil.
31 March	Security Council Resolutions 981, 982 and 983 were adopted unanimously. 981 set up UNCRO (Confidence Restoration Operation) in Croatia; 982 renewed UNPROFOR mandate in Bosnia; 983 transformed UNPROFOR in the Republic of Macedonia to UNPREDEP (UN Preventive Deployment Force). All three new mandates were to run until 30 November 1995.
1 May	Start of the Croatian offensive, Operation Flash, to retake western Slavonia. Croatian Serbs responded by shelling and detained some UN personnel.
3 May	UN-brokered ceasefire agreement signed by Croatia and Croatian Serb representatives.
24–26 May	In response to high levels of shelling and shooting, Lieutenant-General Rupert Smith, UNPROFOR Commander for Bosnia, issued ultimatums: 'RS' to stop firing into the Sarajevo exclusion zone; to return heavy weapons removed from UN collection point by noon on 25 May; and, by 26 May, to remove all heavy weapons from the exclusion zone or put them under UN control.
8 June	US House of Representatives voted for unilateral lifting of arms embargo.
9 June	Carl Bildt, a former Swedish Prime Minister, to succeed Lord Owen as Co- Chairman of the ICFY Steering Committee.
16 June	United Nations Security Council Resolution 998 authorised increase in UNPROFOR personnel by up to 12,500 to reinforce existing forces and create Rapid Reaction Force (RRF). China and Russia abstained.
18 June	UNPROFOR withdrew from weapon-collection points and observation posts in Sarajevo's 20 km exclusion zone.
20 June	NATO requested UN permission for air strike on Banja Luka airport in response to violations of NFZ by Bosnian Serbs.
2 July	UN HQ at Sarajevo shelled by Bosnian Serbs.
3 July	UN convoy on Mount Igman fired at and returned fire.
8 July	'RS' forces moved into Srebrenica safe area.
9 July	'RS' forces overran Srebrenica UN posts, capturing UN troops. UN threatened to call for air strikes if Bosnian Serb forces moved closer.
11 July	NATO air strikes. 'RS' threatened to kill UN hostages. 'RS' forces took Srebrenica. Srebrenica massacre begins, with more than 8,000 Bosniaks killed by Serb forces.
12 July	UN and EU demanded Bosnian Serb withdrawal from Srebrenica.
19 July	'RSK' and forces of Fikret Abdic, a Muslim separatist leader, attacked Bihac region.
21 July	Meeting of EU, UN, NATO, Contact Group and other UN troop contributors held in London to discuss response to Serb attacks on safe areas
22 July	Presidents Tudjman and Izetbegovic met in Split. Agreement signed on joint defence and implementation of the Bosniac/Croat Federation.
23 July	UK, US and French representatives delivered ultimatum to Ratko Mladic, commander of the 'RS' army: attacking Gorazde or putting UN lives at risk there would lead to extensive air strikes.
25 July	International Criminal Tribunal indicted Karadzic and Mladic for genocide and Martić for war crimes. Bosnian Serb forces entered Zepa.
26 July	UN Secretary-General delegated his authority for air strikes to UNPROFOR Commander Bernard Janvier. US Senate voted to lift embargo on Bosnia if UN decided to withdraw or Bosnian Government requested UN withdrawal.
27 July	Tadeusz Mazowiecki, UN Special Rapporteur on Human Rights, resigned, saving he could not participate in pretence of protection of human rights. Abdic declared himself President of the 'Independent Republic of Western Bosnia'.
28 July	'RS' and 'RSK' both declared state of war on their enemies.
29–30 July	Akashi talked to President Tudjman and 'President' Martić with the aim of averting a Croatian offensive against 'RSK'.
1 August	NATO agreed to use theatre-wide air power to protect safe areas.
3 August	UN-brokered talks in Geneva, between Croatian Government and 'RSK' leaders, broke down.
4 August	Croatia launched Operation Storm, which rapidly retook Sectors North and South. The majority of Serbs fled via Bosnia into Serbia, where tens of thousands have settled in Vojvodina. Smaller numbers agreed to move to Kosovo.
7 August	Bosnian Government forces gained control of Abdic's stronghold in the Bihac region.
10 August	US President Clinton's National Security Adviser, Anthony Lake, began four-day trip to London, Bonn, Paris, Madrid, Rome, Moscow and Ankara to outline new US peace initiative, based on the existing Contact Group map.
28 August	Bosnian Serb mortar attack killed 37 civilians in Sarajevo.
29 August	'RS' Assembly welcomed US initiative.
30 August	NATO and RRF began air strikes on 'RS' military targets in response to 28 August mortar attack on Sarajevo. 'RS' and 'FRY' leaderships announced that joint negotiating team, led by President Milosevic who would have casting vote, would consider US peace plan.
8 September	Bosnian, Croatian and 'FRY' Foreign Ministers met in Geneva and reached agreement on basic principles including 1) Bosnia-Hercegovina would continue its legal existence with its present borders and continuing international recognition; 2) it would consist of two entities, each with the right to establish parallel special relationships with neighbouring countries, consistent with the territorial integrity of Bosnia.
14 September	12-hour pause agreed in the NATO/RRF strike campaign to allow for US envoy Richard Holbrooke, Mladic and President Milosevic to conclude a 'Framework for a Cessation of Hostilities Agreement'. Strikes were suspended for 72 hours to allow withdrawal of Serb heavy weapons from Sarajevo exclusion zone. Within 24 hours, airport and humanitarian routes into city were to be opened; within 144 hours the weapons withdrawal was to be completed.
22 September	Croatia revoked the refugee status of all persons from areas of Bosnia held by the Federation.
26 September	Bosnian, Croatian and 'FRY' Foreign Ministers met in New York and agreed that Bosnia would have a central presidency, parliament and constitutional court. Parliament was to be composed of one-third 'RS' delegates and two- thirds Federation delegates. Within the presidency, voting would be by majority, but the results could be blocked by parliaments of the entities. Provision was made for holding internationally supervised elections.
3 October	Attempt to assassinate President Kiro Gligorov of Macedonia.
1–21 November	Bosnian, Croatian and 'FRY/RS' delegations, plus the Contact Group countries, met for talks in Dayton, Ohio.
14 December	Signing of the Dayton Agreement in Paris.

=== 1999 ===
Date	Event
24 March	Start of NATO bombing of Yugoslavia, part of the Kosovo War.
9 June	Signing of the Kumanovo Agreement, a ceasefire with NATO followed by a phased withdrawal of Yugoslav security forces from Kosovo.
10 June	Adoption of United Nations Security Council Resolution 1244, authorizing an international civil and military presence in Yugoslavia and establishing the United Nations Interim Administration Mission in Kosovo.

=== 2000 ===
Date	Event
1 November	United Nations Security Council Resolution 1326 accepts the Federal Republic of Yugoslavia membership into the United Nations. Yugoslavia rejoined the United Nations General Assembly as a new member and as the fifth successor state of the Socialist Federal Republic of Yugoslavia.

=== 2001 ===
Date	Event
June 2001	The five successor states drafted and signed an Agreement on Succession Issues of the Former Socialist Federal Republic of Yugoslavia.

== Serbia and Montenegro ==
=== 2003 ===
Date	Event
4 February	The Federal Republic of Yugoslavia is renamed to Serbia and Montenegro (after its two constituent states) after its leaders reconstitute the country into a loose state-union between Montenegro and Serbia.

=== 2006 ===
Date	Event
21 May	A legal Montenegrin independence referendum; 55.5% of votes for independence.
3 June	The Parliament of Montenegro declares the independence of Montenegro, leaving Serbia as the sole constituent state of Serbia and Montenegro.
5 June	Serbia secedes from Serbia and Montenegro, ending the state union between it and Montenegro that had existed since late November 1918.
28 June	The Republic of Montenegro becomes a member state of the United Nations.

=== 2008 ===
Date	Event
17 February	The Republic of Kosovo declares its independence from Serbia and is eventually recognized by 118 UN member states, including 4 of the former Yugoslav states.

== See also ==
- Timeline of the Croatian War of Independence
- Timeline of the Yugoslav wars
- Independence of Kosovo

== Bibliography ==
- Viktor Meier (1999). "Chronology". Yugoslavia: A History of its Demise. Routledge. ISBN 978-1-134-66510-5.
- Bilić, Ivan (March 2005). "Kronologija raspada SFRJ i stvaranje Republike Hrvatske do 15. siječnja 1992" (PDF). National Security and the Future (in Croatian). 6 (1–2): 73–184. ISSN 1332-4454.
