= 1993 in the Federal Republic of Yugoslavia =

- Decades: 1970s; 1980s; 1990s
- See also: History of Yugoslavia; Timeline of Yugoslavia; List of years in Yugoslavia

This article lists events that occurred during 1993 in the Federal Republic of Yugoslavia.

== Incumbents ==
- President:
  - until 1 June: Dobrica Ćosić
  - 1–25 June: Miloš Radulović
  - starting 25 June: Zoran Lilić

== Events ==
- 3 January – The Socialist Party of Serbia becomes the largest party when the second round of the Yugoslavian 1992–1993 parliamentary election is held.
- FK Partizan wins the Yugoslavian men's national soccer championship.

== Births ==
- 15 March – Aleksandra Krunić, Russian-Serbian tennis player
