= Vrsar Crljenka Airport =

Vrsar airport Zračna luka Vrsar/ "Crljenka"
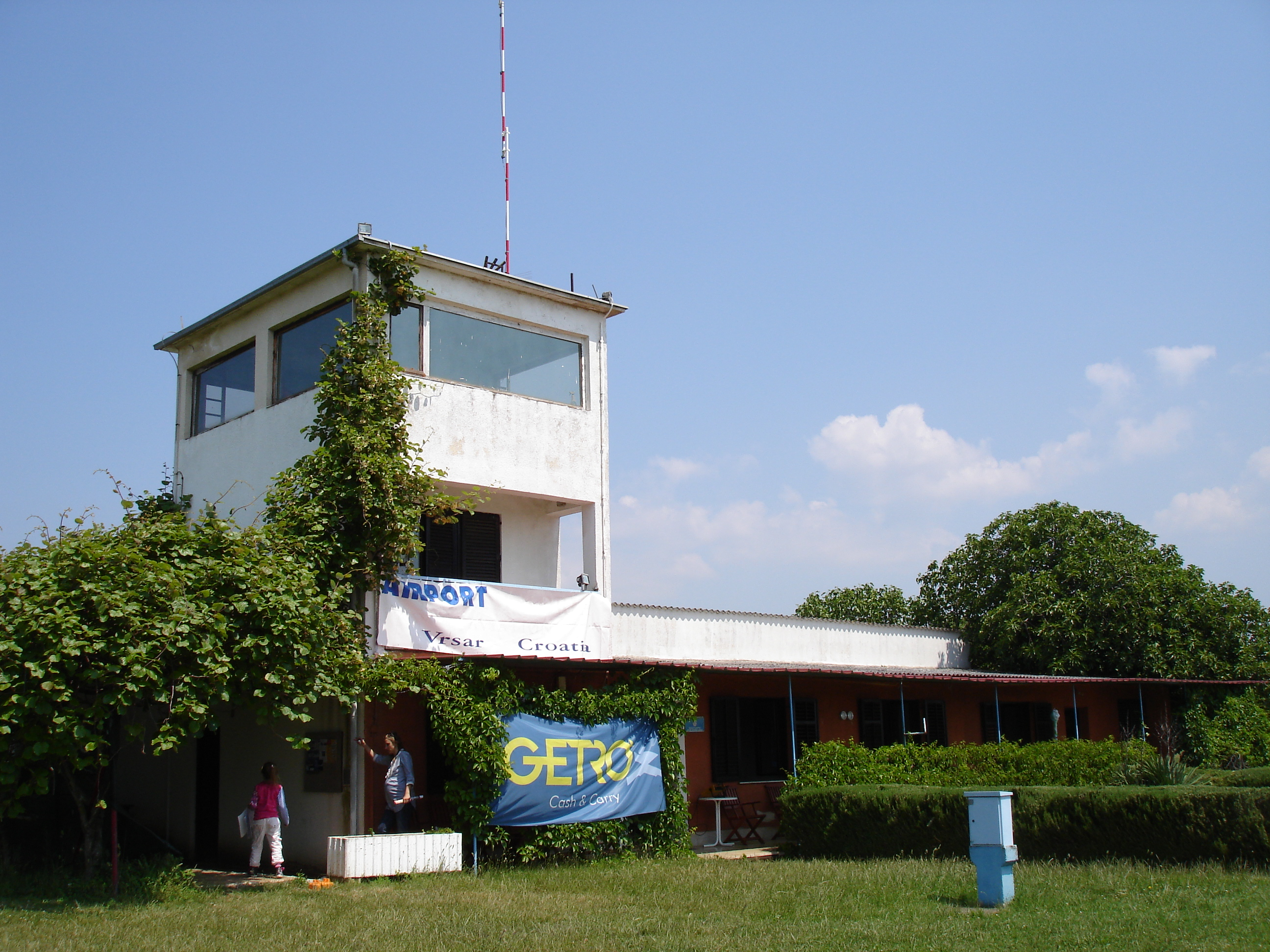
- IATA: none; ICAO: LDPV

Summary
- Airport type: Civil
- Operator: North Adria Aviation
- Serves: Vrsar
- Location: Vrsar, Croatia
- Elevation AMSL: 121 ft (37 m)
- Coordinates: 45°8′30.12″N 13°37′49.73″E

Map
- Location in Croatia

Runways
Direction	Length		Surface
Direction	m	ft	Surface
18/36	701	2,300	Concrete/asphalt

The Vrsar Crljenka Airport is an airport for general aviation in Croatia. It is located about 2 km southeast of Vrsar.

The runway is 701m long and 18m wide. It is oriented north–south (runway mark 36–18). The altitude of the airport is 37 m. The runway thresholds are at 42.3m above sea level in the north (139') and 33.2 m above sea level (109') in the south, so that with a height difference of 9.1m (10') the runway has an inclination of 1.9 ° and 1.3%, respectively. The surface of the runway, the rolls and the platform are in asphalt.

Vrsar Airport was built in 1976. It is equipped to accommodate and maintain small-sized aircraft: it has a fuel pump, a hangar, an aircraft service, a restaurant and customs office. The operator is North Adria Aviation from Vrsar. Navigation services (flight plan, meteorological situation and air traffic control) are performed by the operator via Pula Airport.

It is intended for occasional air traffic and is involved in the following activities:

- Reception and maintenance of small-sized aircraft
- Panoramic flights over Istria
- Flights to domestic and foreign airports
- Sports flights (parachuting, training and competitions)
- Flights of medical services and rescue services
- Fire service flights
- Flights for advertising (throwing leaflets and pulling banners)

The airport is registered for domestic and foreign air traffic. For foreign air traffic, the airport is open from April to November.

Near the airport is a memorial to Dragan Garvan and Dragutin Barić, members of the Croatian Air Force and air defense who were killed in the Croatian War of Independence on December 21, 1991 in the Yugoslav Air Force's attack on Crljenka airport. Cluster munition was found 21 years later near the sports airport.

In 1998 Vrsar hosted the XXIV World Parachuting Championship, which was attended by 245 competitors.

Since August 12th, 2026 the aerodrome is closed to all traffic (by NOTAM B1026/26) due to an ongoing conflict with the municipality of Vrsar.

Vrsar Airport
Aerial view over the Lim Channel to the north	Space for passengers	Part of a platform, with a fuel pump	Customs service
