= North Macedonia–Taiwan relations =

- North Macedonia: Taiwan

North Macedonia–Taiwan relations refers to the bilateral relations between North Macedonia and Taiwan. Diplomatic relations were established in 1999 but were severed in 2001.

China was strongly dissatisfied with the official relations between North Macedonia (then the Republic of Macedonia) and Taiwan, and has adopted diplomatic punishments for North Macedonia by severing diplomatic relations and using the UN veto power respectively.

== History ==
=== Initial contact ===
The relationship began in the late 1990s with Taiwan's aid program for Kosovo, when Lee Teng-hui announced in 1998 that he would provide $300 million to help rebuild Kosovo after the war. Taiwan's ROC government hired Ambassador-at-Large Chiu Hungdah, Jeffrey Koo Sr., and Gene Loh I-Cheng to prepare the aid program.

The initial plan of Lee Teng-hui's administration is that Taiwan's only diplomatic relations in Europe are with the Holy See, the Republic of Macedonia is the first beachhead, and if diplomatic relations are established with it, it is possible to extend diplomacy to Kosovo and even Albania. Executive Yuan President Siew Wan-chang led a delegation to the Republic of Macedonia, along with five legislators, to begin the visit.

The constitution of the Republic of Macedonia is a cabinet system. The then Prime Minister of the Republic of Macedonia, Ljubco Georgievski, was only 33 years old. Georgievski had heard of Taiwan miracle when he lived in the United States and was interested in establishing diplomatic relations with Taiwan. Jevski and the main VMRO-DPMNE party disagreed and formed another VMNO-NP party, and even restored Bulgarian nationality and moved to Sofia, reflecting the multi-ethnic character of the Balkan Peninsula.

On August 5, 1998, Ambassador-at-Large Gene Loh I-Cheng was going to travel to Pristina first, but the exposure of US$300 million in aid in the Taiwanese media caused discontent among some European countries. The North Atlantic Treaty Organization troops stationed in Kosovo were unwilling to open the border to Taiwanese, and the government of the Republic of Macedonia was unable to send troops to protect the Taiwan delegation outside the country, so the trip was temporarily canceled.

=== Establishment of diplomatic relations ===
Before the 1998 Republic of Macedonia parliamentary elections, Vasil Tupurkovski presented a political proposal that the Republic of Macedonia would receive an economic recovery plan. An unknown foreign partner would donate $1 billion and create 120,000 jobs directly to the Republic of Macedonia after he won the election. This was later considered by public opinion to be the main reason why the $1 billion foreign aid pledge helped Tupelkovsky and Georgievski win the election.

Ljubco Georgievski's rightist party VMRO-DPMNE had numerical doubts about Tupurkovski's $1 billion, but nevertheless trusted in the economic promises to form a coalition government with the left-wing Democratic Alternative (DA). However, it was a weak coalition to begin with.

It was only when Tupurkovski visited Taipei in 1998 that the "$1 billion" foreign partner was revealed to be Taiwan. The press reported that the Republic of Macedonia would recognize Taiwan's political independence and establish diplomatic relations.

On January 27, 1999, Foreign Minister of the Republic of Macedonia Aleksandar Dimitrov and Taiwanese Foreign Minister Jason Hu signed a communiqué establishing diplomatic relations. Although the President of the Republic of Macedonia Kiro Gligorov was pro-China and opposed the establishment of diplomatic relations with Taiwan, the parliament of the Republic of Macedonia passed the proposal of establishment of diplomatic ties on February 12.

The Taiwan's foreign ministry said that since the abolition of the ROC embassy in Portugal, only the Vatican remains in Europe, and the Republic of Macedonia is the first new diplomatic partner in Europe in 24 years. In the Euro, the European Union is becoming increasingly influential and it is important to promote European diplomacy. Macedon's foreign minister said that Macedon is still mainly an agricultural country with low income and high unemployment rate, and hopes to learn from Taiwan's experience to develop from an agricultural to an industrial country.

China severed diplomatic ties with the Republic of Macedonia on February 9, 1999, and threatened to use the UN's veto power. On February 25, China launched diplomatic retaliation and opposed the continued dispatch of intervention forces to the Republic of Macedonia in a UN resolution, the fifth time Beijing has used a veto in the Security Council.

Relations were severed in 2001 after the fall of the Republic of Macedonia's pro-Taiwan cabinet. The Republic of Macedonia was the first new Eastern European ally in the 1990s and the first European country to sign a formal military agreement with Taiwan.

=== Official relations ===
In 2023, the Taiwanese tech supplier Yageo and the government of North Macedonia announced a major investment in North Macedonia.

== See also ==
- Foreign relations of North Macedonia
- Foreign relations of Taiwan
- United Nations Security Council Resolution S/1999/201
