= United Nations Preventive Deployment Force =

United Nations peacekeeping force in Macedonia

- Abbreviation: UNPREDEP
- Formation: 31 March 1995
- Legal status: Completed
- Parent organization: United Nations Security Council
- Website: UNPREDEP

The United Nations Preventive Deployment Force (UNPREDEP) was established on 31 March 1995 in Security Council Resolution 983 to replace the United Nations Protection Force (UNPROFOR) in the Republic of Macedonia. The mandate of UNPREDEP remained essentially the same: to monitor and report any developments in the border areas which could undermine confidence and stability in the country and threaten its territory. It is widely considered to be an instance of a successful deployment of UN peacekeeping forces in the prevention of conflict and violence against civilians. The operation was shut down on 28 February 1999, after its last extension in Resolution 1186 when China vetoed its renewal in 1999 following Macedonia's diplomatic recognition of Taiwan. This mission was unique as it was the first peacekeeping operation to undertake conflict prevention before the outbreak of conflict. The premature termination of UNPREDEP in 1999 predates the 2001 insurgency in Macedonia.

== See also ==
- Yugoslav Wars

== External reference ==
- Records of the United Nations Preventive Deployment Force (UNPREDEP) (1995–1999) at the United Nations Archives
