= Timeline of the Yugoslav Wars =

The Yugoslav Wars were a series of armed conflicts on the territory of the former Socialist Federal Republic of Yugoslavia (SFRY) that took place between 1991 and 2001. This article is a timeline of relevant events preceding, during, and after the wars.

== Timeline ==
=== Tito-era ===
1945

The victorious resistance army known as the Yugoslav Partisans form the Socialist Federal Republic of Yugoslavia, a communist union of six republics.

1948–1952

Tito–Stalin split leads to Yugoslavia breaking away from Moscow's influence.

1966

Yugoslav leader Josip Broz Tito removes Aleksandar Ranković, an intelligence officer and main Serbian cadre, from his position. A purge of Serbian cadres from the establishment follows.

1968

Protests in 1968 are echoed in Yugoslavia. The protests are partially student demonstrations. In Kosovo, demonstrators demand greater rights for the Albanian people. Ailing Tito, in his late seventies, allows some liberalization, but despite his old age, refuses to retire.
Croatian terrorists plant bombs at cinemas; several people die.

1971

Nationalist demonstrations in Croatia, known as the Croatian Spring or MASPOK, occur. Tito and the communist government condemn the demonstrations. Many radical nationalists were later convicted for hate-speech, including Stipe Mesić and Franjo Tudjman. A government crisis follows.
A group of Croatian neo-Ustashas from Australia infiltrates Yugoslavia and begins planning terrorist attacks, but their actions are prevented and the group is destroyed.

1972

Yugoslavian Airways (JAT) Flight 364 is downed by Croatian nationalists. Vesna Vulović, a stewardess, is the only survivor after more than a 10,000-meter freefall.

1974

A new constitution of Yugoslavia is proclaimed, which grants more power to federal units and to the autonomous provinces Kosovo and Vojvodina of Serbia, giving them a vote in all relevant decisions in the federal government. It was aimed at addressing grievances of non-Serb nations within Yugoslavia, under what later became known as the weak Serbia, strong Yugoslavia concept. Bosnian Muslims (after 1993 the name was changed to Muslim-Bosniacs, and finally to Bosniaks) were recognized as a sixth "nation" of Yugoslavia (note: "nations" or officially: "narodi" were Slavic majority peoples, while "nationalities" of officially "narodnosti" were all other national minorities) and one of the three constituent peoples of Bosnia and Herzegovina.

May 1980

Josip Broz Tito dies.

=== Fall of communism ===
1981

An economic crisis in Yugoslavia begins. Albanian nationalist demonstrations in Kosovo, demanding the status of a republic and more rights (the slogan "Kosovo republika" which translates to "Republic of Kosovo" or more literally "Kosovo republic"). Demonstrations are suppressed and condemned by all Yugoslav communists, including Albanian communists from Kosovo, calling them counterrevolutionary. Arrests follow.

1983

A group of Bosnian Muslim nationalists are convicted under a Yugoslav law that prohibited spreading international hatred. Among them is Alija Izetbegović who was, among other things, tried for his Islamic Declaration.

1986–1989

A controversial memorandum from the Serbian Academy of Sciences and Arts protests the status of Serbia in Yugoslavia.
Serb chetnik (archduke) Momčilo Đujić (in emigration), promotes Vojislav Šešelj to Chetnik duke by declaration in the USA on Vidovdan, 28 June 1989, a Serbian religious holiday. In his instructions to Šešelj, Đujić orders him to "expel all Croats, Albanians and other foreign elements from the holy Serb ground".
Perceived prosecution of Serbs by Kosovo Albanians fuels growing Serbian nationalist sentiment. Additional police forces are sent to Kosovo.
Slobodan Milošević, a high government official at the time, gives a speech to a small group of Kosovo Serbs where he promises that "no one will beat them", which is aired in the main television news programme. Milošević instantly becomes very popular in Serbia.
Milošević rises to power in Serbia.
Antibureaucratic revolution demonstrations bring pro-Milošević governments to Vojvodina, Kosovo and Montenegro.
Kosovo Albanian miners strike in the Stari Trg mine. The Slovenian government holds a large rally in the Cankar Congress Centre, supporting the Albanians of Kosovo. Albanians outside Serbia, mostly in Slovenia and Croatia, request alliance between Kosovo and their respective nations.
Relations between Slovenia and Serbia deteriorate. An unofficial embargo on Slovenian products is introduced in Serbian stores (see Radmila Anđelković). Slovenia's independence movement grows.
The 600th anniversary of the Battle of Kosovo is celebrated by Serbs across Yugoslavia. Slobodan Milošević gives a speech in Kosovo, described by his opponents as nationalist.

1990

The Communist Party dissolves on republic, and partially national, lines at the 14th Congress of Yugoslav Communist Party (SKJ, Savez komunista Jugoslavije), with Slovenian and Croatian communists leaving the Congress protesting Milošević's actions.
Constitutional changes in Serbia revoke some of the powers granted to Kosovo and Vojvodina by the Constitution of 1974, including the power to cast a vote in the federal council completely independently from Serbia, which in fact stripped off their nigh-to-republic status. This effectively gave Serbia 3 out of 8 votes in the federal council (4 with support from Montenegro).
Serbian nationalist meetings were held in some Serb-populated areas of Croatia, with iconography that was considered provocative by many Croats.
The Yugoslav People's Army (JNA) subjects the formerly-republic and -territorial defense system to a central command, effectively disarming Croatia and Slovenia.
The first democratic elections in 45 years are held in Yugoslavia in an attempt to bring the Yugoslav socialist model into the new, post–Cold War world. Nationalist options win majorities in almost all republics.
The Croatian winning party, HDZ offers a vice-presidential position to the Serb Radical Party, which refuses.
Croatian Serbs start a rebellion against the newly elected government, an event frequently referred to as the "Balvan revolution" (tree-log revolution).
Constitutional changes in Croatia deny the status of a constituent nation to Serbs in Croatia, equating them with all other non-national minorities.
Slovenia holds a referendum on independence from Yugoslavia. which passes with 88.5% of the electorate in favor of independence.

January 1991

Evidence of illegal arming of Croatia and preparations for the war aired on TV. Despite the claims that the tapes were heavily tampered with, Croatian government dismisses Martin Špegelj.
Unsuccessful negotiations between heads of the republics were held in several rounds.

March 1991

Opposition demonstrations in Belgrade against Milosevic rule, ending in two deaths. Army puts tanks on the streets.
Plitvice Lakes incident results in first Croatian fatality when Croatian policemen are ambushed.

=== Armed fighting 1991–1993 ===
May – June 1991

Rising ethnic violence in Croatia. Slovenia and Croatia declare independence.
JNA intervenes in Slovenia by deploying troops to take border areas. Following the Ten-Day War, JNA is defeated. The ethnic homogeneity of Slovenia allows the country to avoid much fighting. The Yugoslav army agrees to leave Slovenia, but supports rebel Serb forces in Croatia.

July 1991

A three month cease fire agreed on Brioni. Yugoslav forces would retreat from Slovenia, and Croatia and Slovenia put a hold on their independence for three months.

September 1991

JNA forces openly attack Croat areas (primarily Dalmatia and Slavonia), starting the Croatian War of Independence. Battle of Vukovar begins.
Battle of the Barracks begins over JNA garrisons throughout Croatia.
EU propose Carrington-Cutileiro plan for Bosnia and Herzegovina. All sides agree, but Izetbegovic later withdraws his signature. (1991 or 1992? - clarification needed)

October 1991

JNA begins Siege of Dubrovnik.
The last Yugoslav People's Army soldier leaves Slovenia.

October 1991-December 1991

Full scale war in Croatia. Fall of Vukovar.

December 1991

The Serb entity in Croatia proclaimed itself the Republic of Serbian Krajina, but remained unrecognized by any country except Serbia.

January 1992

Vance peace plan signed, creating 4 UNPA zones for Serb-controlled territories, and ending large scale military operations in Croatia. UNPROFOR forces arrive to monitor the peace treaty.
Macedonia declares independence. No wars erupted in this area. Slovenia and Croatia are internationally recognized (European Community countries, several EFTA and Central European countries).

February–March 1992

The Carrington–Cutileiro peace plan, resulted from the EC Peace Conference held in February 1992 in an attempt to prevent Bosnia-Herzegovina sliding into war. It proposed ethnic power-sharing on all administrative levels and the devolution of central government to local ethnic communities. However, all Bosnia-Herzegovina's districts would be classified as Muslim, Serb or Croat under the plan, even where no ethnic majority was evident.
On 18 March 1992, all three sides signed the agreement; Alija Izetbegović for the Bosniaks, Radovan Karadžić for the Serbs and Mate Boban for the Croats.
On 28 March 1992, however, Alija Izetbegović withdrew his signature and declared his opposition to any type of partition of Bosnia and Herzegovina.

April 1992

Bosnia and Herzegovina declares independence. Bosnian War begins.
The siege of Sarajevo begins. Bosnian Serb forces mounted the siege of Sarajevo resulting in 10,000 killed by 1995.
Federal Republic of Yugoslavia proclaimed, consisting of Serbia and Montenegro, the only two remaining republics.

May 1992

Yugoslav army retreats from Bosnia and Herzegovina, leaving a large part of its armory to Bosnian Serbs. Military personnel who were born in Bosnia and Herzegovina retain ranks in the newly founded VRS.
United Nations impose sanctions against Federal Republic of Yugoslavia and accepts Slovenia, Croatia and Bosnia and Herzegovina as members.

Summer 1992

Bosnian Serbs gain control of 70% of territory of Bosnia and Herzegovina. Hundreds of thousands of refugees result from the war and large portions of Bosnia and Herzegovina are ethnically cleansed of non-Serbs.

December 1992

Serbia elects Slobodan Milošević as a president for the second time.

=== Armed fighting 1993–1995 ===
January 1993

Vance–Owen peace plan offered. Under pressure from Slobodan Milošević, Karadžić signs the plan, but after a vote in assembly of Bosnian Serbs he withdraws his signature.

March 1993

Fighting begins between Bosniaks and Croats.

July 1993

Owen-Stoltenberg peace plan offered. Refused by Izetbegović in August.

September 1993

Fighting begins in the Bihać region between Bosnian government and Bosniaks loyal to Fikret Abdić. It lasts until August 1995.

March 1994

Peace treaty between Bosniaks and Croats is signed (Washington Agreement), arbitrated by the United States.

February–October 1994

Contact Group (U.S., Russia, France, Britain, and Germany) made steady progress towards a negotiated settlement of the conflict in Bosnia, but no agreement was reached.

August 1994

Serbia closes border with Bosnian Serb republic and imposes embargo, as a measure of pressure to accept the plan of Contact Group.

May 1995

Croatia launches Operation Flash and in 2 days enters Western Slavonia UNPA zone, retaking the territory. The exodus of 11,500–15,000 Serbian refugees follows.

July 1995

Srebrenica massacre reported, 8,000 Bosniaks killed by units of the Army of Republika Srpska (VRS) under the command of General Ratko Mladić.

August 1995

Croatia launches Operation Storm and reclaims over 70% of its pre-war territory, entering all UNPA zones except Eastern Slavonia. Although it effectively ended the war in Croatia's favour, it also resulted in the exodus of the entire Serbian population in these areas, approximately 200,000 refugees.
NATO decides to launch a series of air strikes on Bosnian Serb artillery and other military targets on August 30th, after many incidents with civilian deaths during the years of siege of Sarajevo and in particular the Srebrenica and Markale massacres.

November 1995

Milošević, Tuđman and Izetbegović lead negotiations in Dayton, Ohio.

December 1995

Dayton Agreement signed in Paris, marking end of the war in Bosnia and Herzegovina.

=== Post-1995 era and Kosovo ===
1996

FR Yugoslavia recognizes Croatia, Bosnia and Herzegovina, and the Republic of Macedonia.

1996 - 1998 The process of peaceful reintegration of the Croatian Danube region began on 15 January 1996, with the adoption of the Resolution 1037 which established UNTAES.

Winter 1996/97

Following a fraud in local elections, hundreds of thousands demonstrate in Belgrade against the government for three months. The West quietly supports Milosevic, who is branded the main factor of stability in the Balkans after Dayton, and Milosevic remains in power, after issuing lex specialis and admitting victory of opposition at the local level.

March 1998

Fighting breaks out between Yugoslav forces and ethnic Albanian separatists of the Kosovo Liberation Army in Kosovo. Milošević sends in troops and police.

July 1998

Yugoslavia launched major offensive against the KLA retaking much of Kosovo.

March 1999

NATO starts a 78-day bombing campaign against Yugoslavia over the Kosovo War codenamed Operation Allied Force.

June 1999

Between 848,000 and 863,000 ethnic Albanians flee or are forcefully driven from Kosovo during the conflict.
Control of Kosovo is given to the United Nations, but still remains a part of Serbia/FR Yugoslavia.
An exodus of 200,000 of Serbs and other non-Albanians follows in the wake of revenge attacks by Kosovo Albanians.
Conflict in Southern Serbia between Albanian militants and Yugoslav security forces begins upon end of Kosovo conflict.

December 1999

Franjo Tuđman dies.

October 2000

Slobodan Milošević is overthrown, and Vojislav Koštunica becomes new president of Yugoslavia.

January - August 2001

Fighting between Albanian militant organization National Liberation Army and Macedonians erupts in Macedonia but ends later on in 2001.

June 2001

Conflict in Southern Serbia ends in defeat for Albanians.

=== Aftermath ===
February 2002

Milošević is put on trial in The Hague on charges of war crimes in Kosovo, to which charges of violating the laws or customs of war and grave breaches of the Geneva Conventions in Croatia and Bosnia and massacres in Bosnia were later added. Milošević did not recognize the court and represented himself. His defence is aired in former Yugoslavia and his popularity among Serbs greatly increased as a result.

February 2003

Yugoslavia becomes Serbia and Montenegro.

October 2003

Alija Izetbegović dies.

March 2004

Peak of anti-Serbian violence in Kosovo. Hundreds of ancient Orthodox-Christian Serbian monasteries and churches were burned up to that point.

January 2006

Ibrahim Rugova dies.

March 2006

Slobodan Milošević dies in the Hague prison, ending the proceedings with no verdict reached on any of the counts.

May 21, 2006

Montenegrins vote for independence from the State Union of Serbia and Montenegro in the Montenegrin independence referendum, 2006.

February 2008

On February 17, 2008, Kosovo declared independence from Serbia and is recognised by 97 UN member states, including 4 of the former Yugoslav states.

July 2011 - 2013 Clashes between the Republic of Kosovo and ethnic Serbs in northern Kosovo began on 25 July 2011 when the Kosovo Police crossed into the Serb-controlled municipalities of North Kosovo, to control several administrative border crossings. This was done without the Kosovo Police consulting either Serbia or Kosovo Force (KFOR)/EULEX (European Union Rule of Law Mission in Kosovo).

== See also ==
- Timeline of the breakup of Yugoslavia
- Timeline of the Croatian War of Independence
