= Bedem ljubavi – Mothers for Peace =

Bedem ljubavi – Mothers for Peace is a women's non-governmental association formed in the beginning of 1991 to protest the conscription of Croats and other ethnic groups into the Yugoslav People's Army (JNA) as Slovenia and Croatia had already begun the process of declaring independence.

The organization organized citizen protests around JNA barracks starting on August 29, 1991, which lasted four days and drew tens of thousands of people. Members of the organization travelled to the Yugoslav capital of Belgrade to demand the release of the conscripts.

On September 3, representatives travelled to the European Commission in Brussels to request the international recognition of Croatia to prevent war from escalating.
