= Vrsar airport bombing =

Bombing

- Part of the Croatian War of Independence
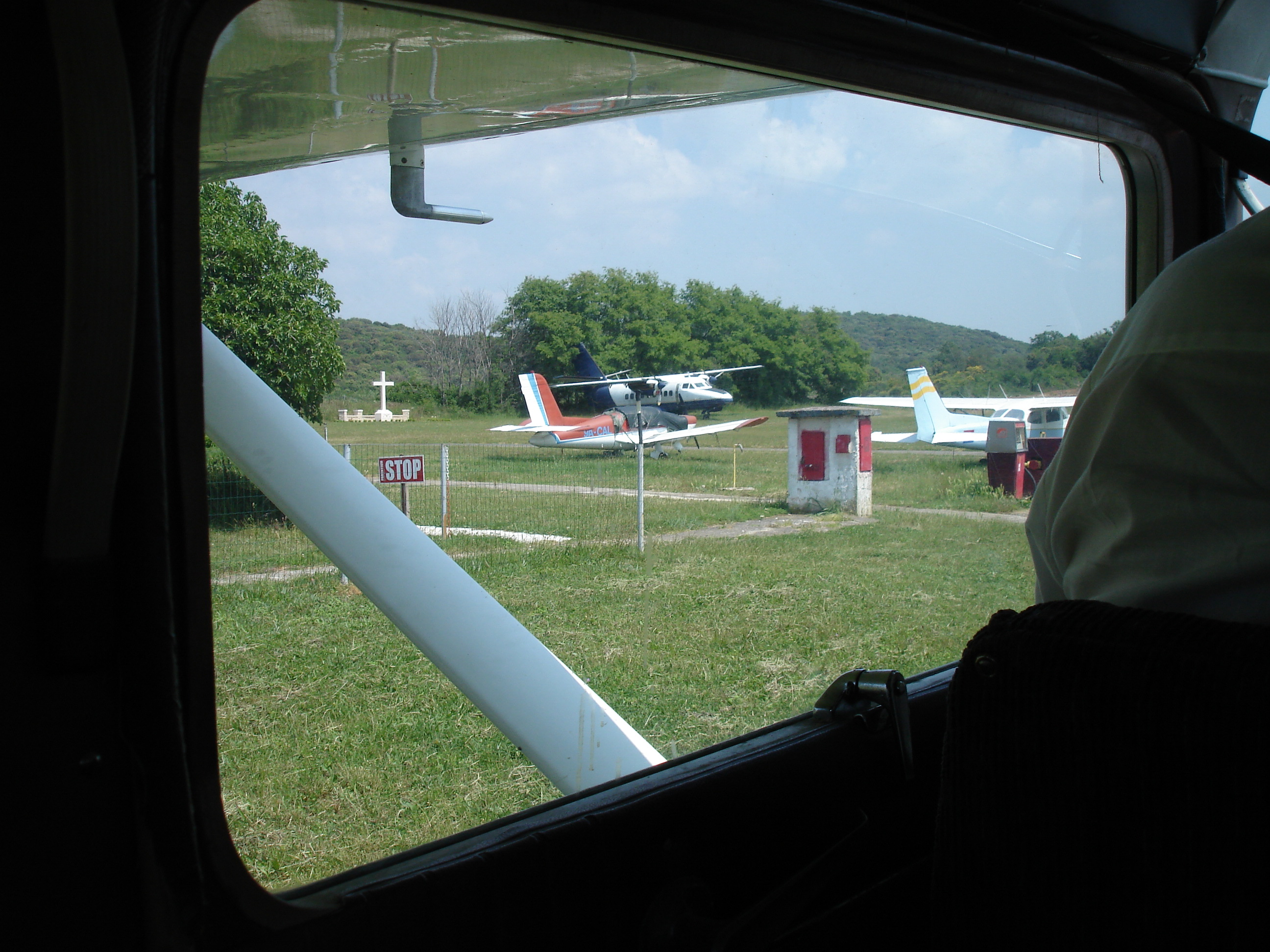
- Crljenka airport, with monument to the victims in the background
- Type: Airstrike
- Location: Vrsar, Croatia
- Target: Vrsar Crljenka Airport
- Date: 21 December 1991
- Executed by: (Socialist Federal Republic of Yugoslavia) Yugoslav Air Force
- Outcome: Airport damaged
- Casualties: 2 killed

The Vrsar airport bombing (Croatian: bombardiranje aerodroma kraj Vrsara) was a Yugoslav Air Force strike on the Crljenka airport near Vrsar—an air sports airport in the Istrian peninsula. The airstrike occurred on 21 December 1991, possibly as an attempt to stop the training of Croatian pilots, who had deserted the Yugoslav Air Force and were being trained in Vrsar. Other than being a training facility, the airport had a significant logistical value. However, since an attack was expected only on the strategically more important Pula Airport (which the JNA had evacuated a little over a month earlier) the airport had little defences, and the Croatians were caught unaware, with the alarm sounding ten minutes after the attack. Two people were killed in the raid, while the airport was damaged.

== Background ==
The jet fighters that attacked Vrsar airport took off from the JNA-controlled airbase of Bihać, which was used intensively in 1991. The base had significant importance, with its strategically located Celopek intercept and surveillance radar on Mount Pljesevica, at the nerve center of an advanced integrated air defence network covering the airspace and territory of Yugoslavia. In addition to its main functions as a protected radar installation, control centre, and secure communications facility, the airbase contained tunnels housing two full fighter squadrons, one reconnaissance squadron, and associated maintenance facilities.

The airport from whence the Yugoslav Air Force attacked Vrsar would later be damaged on purpose by the withdrawing Yugoslav army. Indeed, during the withdrawal of the Yugoslav People's Army, the latter destroyed the runway of the airbase by filling pre-built spaces (designed for the purpose) with explosives and detonating them. To prevent any possible further use of the complex by Croatian and Bosnia-Herzegovinan forces, the Serbian Army of Krajina completed the destruction in 1992 by setting off an additional 56 tonnes of explosives. Residents of nearby villages claimed that smoke continued to rise from the tunnels for six months after the explosion.

An attack was expected on Pula, but not Vrsar. In November 1991, the JNA evacuated Pula Airport, leaving, however, the structure mined. Four bomb disposal experts (Dušan Bulešić, Stevo Grbić, Vicalj Marjanović and Marijan Vinković, members of the Ministry of the Interior and the 119th Istria Brigade) died in the process of demining, after the Croatians decided to relieve the airport. After tensions, night shootings, blackouts and air raids in November and December, the JNA definitively left Pula (and Istria) on 16 December 1991, a few days before the bombing of the Crljenka, after a team of negotiators led by Luciano Delbianco managed to maintain peace while the city was occupied, avoid its destruction, and negotiate a peaceful removal of the JNA army. Peace in Pula was maintained, and success of the negotiations achieved, also thanks to the "presence of honorable men on the other side of the table": Admiral Pogačnik and Admiral Barović, with Barović famously stating "Any destruction won't be conducted here while I'm in command, and if I am still forced to order the destruction of Pula and Istria, then I will no longer be here." The evacuation of Istria by the JNA and the Yugoslav Navy handed over the Croatian TO weapons to the HV. The quantity of TO weapons handed over in Istria—where the JNA evacuated 78 facilities—was enough to arm two combat brigades.

== Reason for the attack ==
The reason for the attack might have been thwarting the training of some pilots who had deserted the Yugoslav Air Force and were reportedly being trained in Vrsar. Other than being a training facility, the airport had "a significant logistical value for Istria." An attack on the Vrsar airport, however, was regarded as quite unlikely. As a result, the airbase of Vrsar was unequipped, had little air defences and a poor surveillance and reporting service.

== Bombing ==
Map of the involved airbases. The JNA definitively left Pula on December 15, 1991, just a few days before the Vrsar Bombing, while Željava air base near Bihać was evacuated and destroyed by the Serbs in 1992. Serb-held territories are marked in red.

Although Istria was one of the less affected regions in the Croatian War of Independence, it was not spared from attacks.

It is believed that the Vrsar Bombing was carried out by the 124th Fighter Aviation Squadron of the 117th Fighter Aviation Regiment stationed at the Željava airbase. The aircraft took off from Bihać and flew in from the Lim Channel.

Just before 1 pm, the seven (according to other sources 4 to 8) MiG-21 aircraft that had taken off from Bihać launched a rocket and bombing attack on Vrsar airport, dropping 250 kg bombs, two to four cluster bombs, eight to twelve 127 mm lighting rockets, ninety to one hundred 23 mm cannon shells and twenty-five to thirty 57 mm missiles, as well as a napalm bomb that failed to ignite. Because, as mentioned, an attack on Vrsar airport was not expected, and the airport had little air defences, while the "surveillance and reporting service did not respond in time," the alarm sounded ten minutes after the attack had begun.

Two people lost their lives in the bombing: Dragutin Barić, a member of the Croatian Air Force, and Dragan Garvan, a member of the Vrsar Aviation Group. As technicians at the beginning of the war, they were fixing up agricultural aircraft for combat operations and of defense. Debate as to why the airport of Vrsar was attacked instead of that of Pula continues to this day. Also, it remains unknown who ordered the attack.

A memorial cross was erected for the two victims at the place where they were killed.

== Sources ==
- "21. obljetnica raketiranja: Gorbačov spasio Tuđmana, Mesića i Markovića od atentata!" [The 21st anniversary of the rocket attack: Gorbachev saved Tuđman, Mesić and Marković from the assassination attempt!] (in Croatian). Jutarnji list. 7 October 2012. Archived from the original on 15 November 2012.
- Magas, Branka (13 December 1999). "Obituary: Franjo Tudjman". The Independent. Archived from the original on 10 November 2012.
- Riding, Alan (26 June 1991). "Europeans Warn on Yugoslav Split". The New York Times. Archived from the original on 1 December 2013.
- Sudetic, Chuck (2 October 1990). "Croatia's Serbs Declare Their Autonomy". The New York Times. Archived from the original on 12 November 2012.
- Eastern Europe and the Commonwealth of Independent States. London, England: Taylor & Francis. 1999. ISBN 978-1-85743-058-5.
- "Govor predsjednika Hrvatskog sabora Luke Bebića povodom Dana neovisnosti" [Speech of Luka Bebić, Speaker of the Croatian Parliament on occasion of the Independence day] (in Croatian). Sabor. 7 October 2008. Archived from the original on 1 December 2013.
- Sudetic, Chuck (4 November 1991). "Army Rushes to Take a Croatian Town". The New York Times. Archived from the original on 29 July 2012.
- Sudetic, Chuck (3 October 1991). "Navy Blockade of Croatia Is Renewed". The New York Times. Archived from the original on 14 June 2013.
- "The Release of the Barracks" (PDF). 20 Years of the Croatian Armed Forces. Hrvatski vojnik. Archived from the original (PDF) on 2012-10-08.
- Nezirović, Vanja (25 August 2009). "Ne dolazi u obzir da se odreknemo Pantovčaka" [Giving up Pantovčak is out of the question] (in Croatian). Jutarnji list. Archived from the original on 1 December 2013.
- Ivanković, Davor (7 October 2012). "Tuđmana spasila dojava, JNA ga gađala američkim bombama" [Tuđman saved by a tip-off, Yugoslav People's Army targeted him with US bombs] (in Croatian). Večernji list. Archived from the original on 5 November 2012.
- Špegelj, Martin (2001). Žanić, Ivo (ed.). Sjećanja vojnika [Memories of a Soldier] (in Croatian). Zagreb, Croatia: Znanje. ISBN 9789531952064.

== See also ==
- Pula Airport incident
- 1995 Rijeka bombing
