= United Nations Security Council Resolution 983 =

UN Security Council Resolution 983
- UNPREDEP medal bar
- Date: 31 March 1995
- Meeting no.: 3,512
- Code: S/RES/983 (Document)
- Subject: Macedonia
- Voting summary: 15 voted for; None voted against; None abstained
- Result: Adopted

Security Council composition
- Permanent members: China; France; Russia; United Kingdom; United States
- Non-permanent members: Argentina; Botswana; Czech Republic; Germany; Honduras; Indonesia; Italy; Nigeria; Oman; Rwanda

United Nations Security Council resolution 983 was adopted unanimously on 31 March 1995, after recalling Resolution 795 (1992) on Macedonia. The council expressed concern about threats to the stability of the country and established the United Nations Preventive Deployment Force (UNPREDEP) by renaming the United Nations Protection Force (UNPROFOR) unit in the country for a period ending 30 November 1995.

The council was determined for the need to protect the sovereignty, territorial integrity and independence of Macedonia and welcomed the role of UNPROFOR in the country. It was decided that the UNPROFOR unit in Macedonia be renamed to UNPREDEP and that its mandate should continue until 30 November 1995. It was urged to continue co-operation with the Organization for Security and Co-operation in Europe and for Member States to provide any necessary assistance required.

The secretary-general was requested to keep the council informed on developments. It had previously established the United Nations Confidence Restoration Operation in Croatia in Resolution 981.

== See also ==
- Bosnian War
- Breakup of Yugoslavia
- Croatian War of Independence
- List of United Nations Security Council Resolutions 901 to 1000 (1994–1995)
- Yugoslav Wars
