= United Nations Security Council Resolution S/1999/201 =

UN S 1999/201
- Map of Macedonia
- Date: 02-25 1999
- Meeting no.: 3982
- Code: S/1999/201
- Subject: Macedonia
- Voting summary: 13 voted for; 1 voted against; 1 abstained

United Nations Security Council Resolution S/1999/201 was proposed on February 25, 1999, on whether to send a reserve intervention force to Macedonia. China used its veto to boycott in retaliation for Macedonia's establishment of diplomatic relations with Taiwan, and the case failed.

== Background ==
On January 27, 1999, the Republic of Macedonia established diplomatic relations with the government of the Republic of China (Taiwan). China quickly retaliated and threatened to make necessary countermeasures at the United Nations.

Earlier on February 25, U.N. officials told The Associated Press that China intended to veto the U.N. resolution and block the duration of the presence of peacekeepers in Macedonia. The 1,100-strong force was stationed at Skopje Airport in 1993, and their mission was to prevent the spread of hostilities from Yugoslavia.

Chinese Foreign Ministry spokesman Zhang Qiyue issued a statement saying "there is no more need for China to yield to the request of the Macedonia side". This hints that China will take stronger diplomatic retaliation, and China has severed diplomatic relations with Macedonia on February 9.

== Voting ==
The overwhelming majority of Council members agreed to continue sending a preventive intervention force to Macedonia. The resolution was supported by 13 countries, with 1 abstention (Russia) and 1 vote against (China). Because China is a permanent member of the Security Council, the resolution was not passed.

Approved (13)	Abstained (1)	Opposed (1)
Argentina; Bahrain; France; Brazil; Canada; France; Gabon; Gambia; Malaysia; Namibia; Netherlands; Slovenia; United Kingdom; United States	Russia	China

== China's counterattack ==
China's permanent representative to the United Nations did not speak until after the vote. Qin Huasun believes that the situation in Macedonia has improved, and there is no need to extend any preventive intervention force. He also called out the participating countries not to interfere in China's decision., and stated:

We believe that deciding one’s own position on the merits of a matter is the right of every sovereign State. Some countries made accusations against China. Those accusations are totally groundless.

This is the second time China has used its veto power at the United Nations over the political status of Taiwan. Last time, in 1997, China also vetoed sending military observers to Guatemala, because Guatemala has diplomatic relations with Taiwan. Besides, it supports Taiwan's return to the United Nations in the name of the Republic of China.
