= Pula Airport incident =

1991 Croatian war airport incident

- Pula Airport incident (Croatia)
- Date: 10 November 1991
- Location: Pula, Croatia
- Type: Land mine explosion
- Deaths: 4

The Pula Airport incident occurred on November 10, 1991 in Pula, Croatia, during the Croatian War of Independence, when four technicians were blown up in an attempt to the demine Pula Airport. The airport had been left heavily mined by the Serb forces, who had just left the airport.

Due to the need to take over the airbase and the possibility of blasting the runway at the military airport, the crisis command sent a team to take over the facilities, which included four bomb disposal experts: Dušan Bulešić, Stevo Grbić, Vicalj Marjanović and Marijan Vinković. Two of them were members of the Croatian National Guard (ZNG), whereas the other two were members of the Ministry of the Interior.

The experts ensured that the JNA soldiers would not blow up the runway, and then proceeded with the process of demining. They attempted to disarm the bombs together with timed detonators. At 1:30 pm, the deminers visited the wells loaded with explosives again, when the latter detonated. All four technicians lost their lives.

It took four months of demining work by the Croatian Army and the Ministry of the Interior to clean the airport of about 10 tons of explosives with which the Yugoslav Army intended to blow up the airport. Over the course of the four months, a team of twelve people from the 33rd Engineering Battalion, supported by workers from the Uljanik shipyard, demined 4,500 square kilometres (1,700 sq mi) and deactivated around 3,000 mines, and four more people were injured. The process was completed with a handover to the civilian authorities on 7 March 1992.

== See also ==
- Vrsar Bombing
