= Operation Baranja =

Croatian War of Independence battle

Coordinates: 45.71°N 18.43°E

- Part of the Croatian War of Independence
- Belišće and Osijek on the map of Croatia; JNA/RSK-held territories in April 1992 are highlighted in red.
Date	3 April 1992
Location	Western part of Baranja, north of Belišće, Croatia
Result	Serbian victory

Belligerents
Croatia	Republic of Serbian Krajina; Yugoslavia

Commanders and leaders
(Croatia) Karl Gorinšek (Croatia) Miroslav Štargl	Unknown

Strength
1,800	Unknown

Casualties and losses
15–16 killed 85 wounded	c. 30 killed c. 30 captured

Operation Baranja (Croatian: Operacija Baranja) was an aborted offensive of the Croatian Army (Hrvatska vojska – HV) north of the towns of Belišće and Valpovo, Croatia on 3 April 1992 during the Croatian War of Independence. The offensive quickly gained ground after the HV advanced north of the Drava River into Baranja. The defending force of the Croatian Serb Territorial Defence Force supported by the Yugoslav People's Army (Jugoslovenska Narodna Armija – JNA) artillery were caught unprepared and offered light resistance.

However, the offensive was not authorised and it was cancelled six hours after it had been launched. An investigation was launched by the HV, and two senior officers were relieved of their duty, before being reassigned to new positions. According to General Martin Špegelj, the decision to abort the offensive was wrong as it meant a missed opportunity to recapture Baranja which had been lost to the JNA in 1991. Admiral Davor Domazet-Lošo pointed out that the offensive presented a significant political problem to Croatian leadership as it meant that the political leaders of Croatia had poor control over its military, or that Croatia was violating its international obligations towards the United Nations (UN) in respect of the Vance plan at the time the country sought to become a member of the UN.

During the fighting, and in its aftermath, the JNA shelled several Croatian settlements and three Croatian civilians living in Croatian Serb-controlled Baranja were killed in retribution. The battle is commemorated annually in the towns of Belišće and Valpovo.

== Background ==
In 1990, following the electoral defeat of the government of the Socialist Republic of Croatia, ethnic tensions worsened. The Yugoslav People's Army (Jugoslovenska Narodna Armija – JNA) confiscated Croatia's Territorial Defence Force's (Teritorijalna obrana – TO) weapons to minimize resistance. On 17 August, the tensions escalated into an open revolt by Croatian Serbs, centred on the predominantly Serb-populated areas of the Dalmatian hinterland around Knin, parts of the Lika, Kordun, Banovina regions and eastern Croatia.

Following the Pakrac clash between Serb insurgents and Croatian special police in March 1991, the conflict had escalated into the Croatian War of Independence. The JNA stepped in, increasingly supporting the Croatian Serb insurgents. In early April, the leaders of the Croatian Serb revolt declared their intention to integrate the area under their control, known as SAO Krajina, with Serbia. In May, the Croatian government responded by forming the Croatian National Guard (Zbor narodne garde – ZNG), but its development was hampered by a United Nations (UN) arms embargo introduced in September. On 8 October, Croatia declared independence from Yugoslavia, and a month later the ZNG was renamed the Croatian Army (Hrvatska vojska – HV). Late 1991 saw the fiercest fighting of the war, as the 1991 Yugoslav campaign in Croatia culminated in the Siege of Dubrovnik, and the Battle of Vukovar.

== Prelude ==
The JNA attacked Osijek, the largest city in Slavonia region of Croatia, for the first time on 31 July 1991, and heavily bombarded the city's center on 19 August. The attacks came from positions north, east and south of the city. By 23 August, the JNA had secured its control over the bulk of Baranja region, just across the Drava River north of Osijek. The intensity of the shelling increased thereafter, peaking through November and December. After JNA captured Vukovar on 18 November, the JNA, supported by the Serbian Ministry of Interior-trained Serb Volunteer Guard paramilitaries, started to advance west between Vinkovci and Osijek on 20 November. The city of Osijek appeared to be the next target of the JNA, which was later confirmed by the commander of the JNA 1st Military District. Later that month, Croatia, Serbia and the JNA agreed upon the Vance plan, contained in the Geneva Accord. The plan entailed a ceasefire, protection of civilians in specific areas designated as United Nations Protected Areas and UN peacekeepers in Croatia.

In late November, JNA units south of Osijek advanced westward, threatening Đakovo and potential encirclement of Osijek. In early December, the JNA continued to achieve modest advances south of Osijek, while being held back by Croatian defences on the eastern outskirts of the city. The HV managed to contain the JNA attacks, even though the fighting continued south of Osijek until January 1992. Advances of the JNA north of Osijek threatened HV control of a narrow bridgehead in Baranja. By mid-December the bridgehead was reduced to a strip of land comprising suburban settlements of Podravlje and Tvrđavica. In response, the HV launched an offensive codenamed Operation Devil's Beam on 17–18 December. The offensive successfully pushed the JNA north about four kilometres (2.5 miles) north of Osijek. The JNA also withdrew from the village of Kopačevo towards Darda and Vardarac, but the HV did not have resources to exploit the development.

The ceasefire envisaged by the Vance Plan came into effect on 3 January 1992. In December 1991, the European Community announced its decision to grant a diplomatic recognition to Croatia on 15 January 1992. SAO Krajina renamed itself the Republic of Serbian Krajina (RSK) on 19 December 1991. Despite the Geneva Accord requiring an immediate withdrawal of JNA personnel and equipment from Croatia, the JNA stayed behind for up to eight months in some areas. When its troops eventually pulled out, JNA left their equipment to the RSK. As a consequence of organisational problems and breaches of ceasefire, the UN peacekeepers, named the United Nations Protection Force (UNPROFOR), did not start to deploy until 8 March. The UNPROFOR took two months to fully assemble in the UN Protected Areas (UNPAs).

== Timeline ==
Map of Baranja in Croatia (Drava River highlighted in blue for reference)

In the first few months of 1992, after the comprehensive ceasefire took effect in Croatia, the command of the 107th Brigade of the HV was tasked with manning the front line along the Drava River. The brigade's positions were centered on the towns of Belišće and Valpovo, spanning between the villages of Gat and Nard on the south (right) bank of the river. A battalion of the unit also held a small bridgehead on the northern bank of the river, an area prone to flooding. Faced with the prospect of abandoning the bridgehead in case of a flood, the commanding officer of the 107th Brigade, Lieutenant Colonel Miroslav Štargl formulated a plan to reinforce the battalion on the northern bank of the Drava River and capture more favourable positions in Baranja before the UNPROFOR deployed to the area. Later on, intermittent shelling of Valpovo by the JNA was also cited as a motivation for the offensive. Štargl forwarded his plan to the Osijek Operational Zone for approval, which was granted by the zone commander Colonel Karl Gorinšek on 30 March. Furthermore, Gorinšek authorised artillery support for the advance and earmarked the 136th Brigade to support the initial push by the 107th once the advance gained ground. Štargl issued the order for Operation Baranja on 2 April, designating the Nard–Jagodnjak–Petlovac line as the objective of the offensive, encompassing the area of so-called Baranja Triangle (Baranjski trokut). The brigade had earmarked 1,800 troops for the operation.

The offensive was launched on 3 April, at 5:45. The 107th Brigade started to advance and moved tanks, armoured personnel carriers and artillery earmarked for direct fire support. Croatian Serb TO units north of the Drava River were caught unprepared, and by 11:00 the 107th Brigade had placed approximately 70% of the river bank opposite Gat–Nard line under its control, sustaining light casualties. In the process, the HV captured approximately 30 Croatian Serb troops and recovered bodies of another 30 Croatian Serb soldiers killed in the combat. However, at 11:45, the brigade received orders from Zagreb cancelling the offensive and ordering the HV to withdraw to its initial positions of that morning. Similarly, the 136th Brigade was held back and never deployed to support the offensive, while long-range fire support was cancelled. At the same time, Gorinšek was relieved of his duty. The 107th Brigade withdrew the same day. A part of the force was cut off and could not reach Drava anymore. Instead they advanced onto Hungarian soil and returned to Croatia via Donji Miholjac border crossing the following day.

In response to the HV offensive the JNA shelled HV positions and a large number of settlements in the eastern Slavonia on 3 April. The shelling was expanded the following day to Slavonski Brod, where the city centre was targeted, while Osijek was targeted for more than ten days after the fighting in Baranja had ceased. On 4 April, the 12th (Novi Sad) Corps of the JNA ordered mobilisation of six brigades of Croatian Serb TO in Baranja and eastern Slavonia, expecting further HV attacks both in Baranja and in the eastern Slavonia.

== Aftermath ==
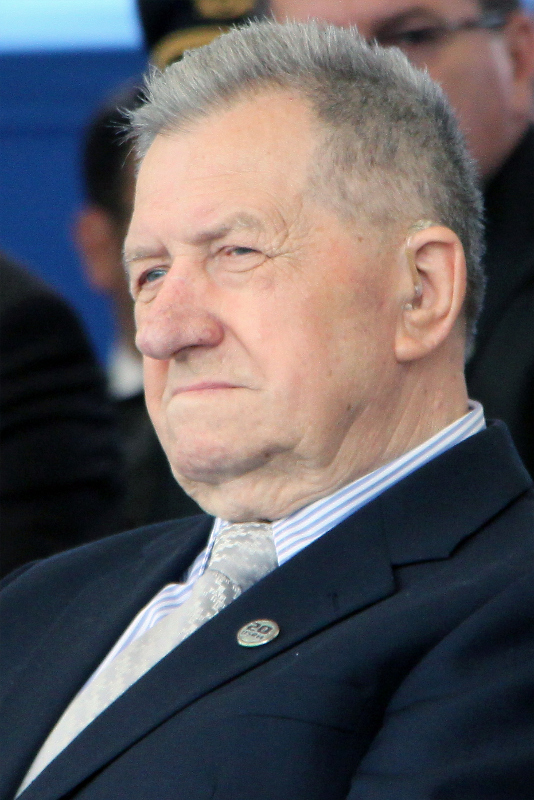
General Martin Špegelj investigated Operation Baranja

There are conflicting reports about the number of killed troops of the 107th Brigade in the battle—reported variously as 15 or 16. The HV also sustained 85 wounded in the offensive. General Martin Špegelj claims that all the fatalities and approximately 30 wounded were sustained during the pullout. An investigation into the offensive was launched by a three-member commission appointed by Croatian President Franjo Tuđman. It comprised Špegelj, General Janko Bobetko and Major General Slobodan Praljak. The commission convened in Bizovac on 7 April and moved to the 107th Brigade's headquarters in Belišće the following day where it conducted interviews with brigade personnel. Špegelj drafted a report the same day, commending combat performance of the 107th Brigade, but rebuked its commander for the unauthorized deployment of the HV. Ultimately Gorinšek was assigned to serve in the General Staff of the Armed Forces of the Republic of Croatia. Štargl was removed from command of the 107th Brigade, but only to serve with the Osijek Operational Zone staff. In the immediate aftermath of the fighting, three Croatian civilians were killed in Croatian Serb-controlled Baranja in retribution for Croatian Serb TO fatalities in the fighting of 3 April. Furthermore, all Croats living in the village of Popovac were interned overnight for two to three days.

Špegelj concluded that the decision to cancel the offensive was political one, but Tuđman did not tell him why was the operation cancelled when Špegelj submitted his report to Tuđman on 15 April. In Špegelj's opinion the offensive should have been carried on and its objective extended to Croatian recapture of entire Baranja, i.e. the municipality of Beli Manastir, which was designated a UN Protected Area under the Vance plan. According to Admiral Davor Domazet-Lošo, the offensive caused political damage to Croatia because it meant that Croatia was either in breach of its obligations towards the UN at the time when it was requesting to be admitted to the UN, or that its political leadership had questionable authority over its military.

The offensive is commemorated annually in Valpovo and Belišće by a procession from the bridge spanning the Drava River in Belišće to the monument to the killed soldiers of the 107th Brigade in Baranja.

== See also ==
- Battle of the Miljevci Plateau — unauthorised deployment of the HV in June 1992
