= Vita Mavrič =

Slovene singer

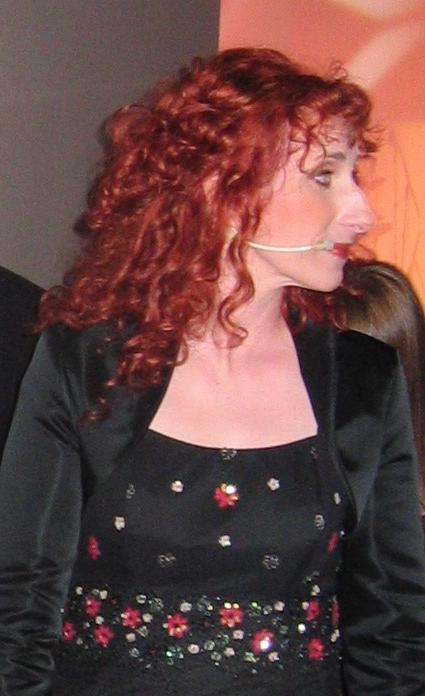

Background information
- Occupation: Chansonnier
- Website: http://www.vitamavric.com/

Vita Mavrič is a Slovene chansonnier.

== Career ==
Vita Mavrič started her career at the Ljubljana City Theatre in a 1987 musical, titled "In the Slovene Mountains" (originally in Serbo-Croatian "U slovenačkim gorama").

Based on the poetry of Slovene poets, she recorded a solo concert, "Pesem je ženska" (A Song Is a Woman), and released her first album at the National Slovene Television, that was followed by a 1991 solo concert in Cankar Hall, based on poetry by Janez Menart, Ervin Fritz, Milan Jesih, and others.

In 1994, she founded Café Theatre which she has art-directed ever since. In 2000, she founded "La Vie en Rose", an international chanson festival.

Her 2012 "Mandeljni in rozine" included Jewish klezmer songs, based on translations by Klemen Jelinčič and the re-creation of poems by Milan Dekleva, songs from Rezija and Istria, and songs about the fate of some Romani people. It was premiered at Cankar Hall.

== Works ==
- "Bikec Ferdinand" (Ferdinand the Bull), a musical for children, performed together with the Ljubljana Dance Theatre
- "Ne smejte se, umrl je klovn" (Don't Laugh, a Clown Died), a music-theatre project of Frane Milčinski's chansons that won her the Župančič Award,
- "Sneguljčica" (The Snow White), an opera composed by Bojan Adamič,
- 1995 "Arabella", a musical produced by Café Theatre,
- "Nekoč bili smo v maju" (Once We Were in May), a concert with music composed by Mojmir Sepe and performed by the symphonic orchestra, with theatre, film and a ballet performance, directed by Matjaž Pograjc, dedicated to her colleague Borut Lesjak,
- "Sem, kakršna sem" (I Am What I Am), her second CD,
- "Yearnings", her third CD with Bertolt Brecht's and Kurt Weill's chansons
