= Jenko Award =

Slovenian literary award

The Jenko Award (Slovene: Jenkova nagrada) is a literary award in Slovenia awarded each year for the best poetry collection in Slovene published in the previous two years. It has been bestowed since 1986 by the Slovene Writers' Association. It is named after the 19th-century Slovene poet Simon Jenko.

Year	Author	Poetry Collection	Title in English	Publisher	Year of publication
2019	Kaja Teržan				
2016	Anja Golob	Didaskalije k dihanju	Didaskalia for Breathing	self-published	2016
2015	Miklavž Komelj	Noč je abstraktnejša kot n	The Night Is More Abstract than N	Umetniško Združenje Hyperion	2014
2014	Anja Golob	Vesa v zgibi	Bent Hang	Mladinska knjiga	2013
2013	Kristina Hočevar	Na zobeh aluminij, na ustnicah kreda	Teeth of Aluminium, Lips of Chalk	ŠKUC	2012
2012	Janez Ramoveš	Skuz okn strejlam kurente	I Shoot at Kurents through the Window	Cankarjeva založba	2012
2011	Primož Čučnik	Kot dar	As a Gift	LUD Šerpa	2010
2010	Ivo Svetina	Sfingin hlev	The Sphynx' Stable	Goga	2010
2009	Aleš Debeljak	Tihotapci	Bootleggers	Mladinska knjiga	2009
2008	Andrej Medved	Približevanja	Convergences	Hyperion	2008
2007	Tomaž Šalamun	Sinji stolp	Blue Tower	Beletrina	2007
2006	Josip Osti	Vse ljubezni so nenavadne	All Loves Are Unusual	Litera	2006
2006	Miklavž Komelj	Hipodrom	Hippodrome	Mladinska knjiga	2006
2005	Maja Vidmar	Prisotnost	Presence	Center za slovensko književnost	2005
2004	Ciril Bergles	Moj dnevnik priča	My Diary Speaks	Center za slovensko književnost	2004
2004	Jože Snoj	Poslikava notranjščine	Painting Interiors	Cankarjeva založba	2004
2003	Brane Mozetič	Banalije	Banalities	Škuc	2003
2002	Erika Vouk	Opis slike	Picture Description	Litera	2002
2001	Milan Jesih	Jambi	Iambi	Mladinska knjiga	2000
2000	Uroš Zupan	Drevo in vrabec	The Tree and the Sparrow	LUD Literatura	1999
1999	Niko Grafenauer	Odtisi	Impressions	Nova revija	1999
1998	Dane Zajc	Dol dol	Down Down	Nova revija	1998
1997	Peter Semolič	Hiša iz besed	House Made of Words	Aleph	1996
1996	Iztok Osojnik	Klesani kamni	Carved Stones	Obzorja	1995
1996	Alojz Ihan	Južno dekle	Southern Girl	Mihelač	1995
1995	Boris A. Novak	Mojster nespečnosti	Master of Insomnia	Mladinska knjiga	1995
1994	Svetlana Makarovič	Tisti čas	That Time	Mladika	1993
1993	Kajetan Kovič	Sibirski ciklus	Siberian Cycle	Mihelač	1992
1992	Jure Detela	Pesmi	Poems	Wieser	1992
1991	Milan Dekleva	Odjedanje božjega	Eating Away the Divine	Emonica	1988
1990	Milan Jesih	Soneti	Sonnets	Wieser	1989
1989	Aleš Debeljak	Slovar tišine	Dictionary of Silence	Aleph	1987
1988	Tomaž Šalamun	Mera časa	A Measure of Time	Cankarjeva založba	1987
1987	Veno Taufer	Vodenjaki	Waterlings	Državna založba	1986
1986	Niko Grafenauer	Palimpsesti	Palimpsests	Mladinska knjiga	1984
