= Jesih =

Jesih is a surname. Notable people with the surname include:

- Milan Jesih (born 1950), Slovene poet, playwright and translator
- Pavla Jesih (1901–1976), Slovenian mountaineer and female entrepreneur
