= Ciril Bergles =

Slovene poet, essayist and translator

- Born: 18 July 1934; Repče, Kingdom of Yugoslavia (now in Slovenia)
- Died: 25 August 2013 (aged 79)
- Occupations: Poet, translator and essayist
- Writing career
- Notable works: Moj dnevnik priča, Pesnik v Benetkah, Ellis Island
- Notable awards: Jenko Award; 2004 for Moj dnevnik priča

Ciril Bergles (18 July 1934 – 25 August 2013) was a Slovene poet, essayist and translator. He published numerous collections of poetry and was also known for his translations of poetry, mostly by Spanish and South American authors, into Slovene.

Bergles was born in Repče, just outside Ljubljana in 1934. He studied Slovene and English at the University of Ljubljana and worked as a secondary school teacher after graduation. He started publishing his poetry in 1984 with his collection Na poti v tišino (On the Path to Silence). In 2004 he won the Jenko Award for his poetry collection Moj dnevnik priča (My Diary Speaks). He translated poetry by Jorge Guillén, Alejandra Pizarnik, Jaime Gil de Biedma, Adrienne Rich, Fernando Pessoa, Luis Cernuda, Justo Jorge Padrón, Miguel de Unamuno, Constantine Cavafy, Rubén Darío, Ernesto Cardenal, Rafael Alberti, Federico García Lorca and César Vallejo into Slovene. He also published an anthology of Basque poets in Slovene entitled Branil bom očetovo hišo (I Will Defend My Father's House).

== Poetry collections ==
- Tutankamon (2008)
- Zaupna sporočila (2008)
- Tvoja roka na mojem čelu (2006)
- Moj dnevnik priča (2004)
- V Polifemovem očesu (2004)
- Z besedo in ognjem (1999)
- Čas darovanja (1999)
- Razsežnost prosojnosti (1996)
- Noč, nato še dan (1996)
- Via Dolorosa (1996)
- Ifrikija (1993)
- Ta dom je večen (1991)
- Pesnik v Benetkah (1990)
- Ellis Island (1988)
- Vaje za svetlobo (1985)
- Na poti v tišino (1984)
