= Bognár =

Bognár or Bognar is a Hungarian surname meaning "wheelwright". Notable people with the surname include:

- György Bognár (born 1961), retired Hungarian football player
- László Bognár, (born 1968), former Hungarian professional boxer
- Richárd Bognár, Hungarian sport shooter
- Rick Bognar (1970–2019), Canadian professional wrestler
- Steven Bognar (born 1963), American Oscar-winning documentary filmmaker
- Zoran Bognar (born 1965), Serbian poet and writer
- Zsolt Bognár (born 1979), Hungarian football player
