= Mavrič =

Mavrič is a Slovenian surname. Notable people with the surname include:

- Borut Mavrič (born 1970), Slovenian football player
- Matej Mavrič (born 1979), Slovenian football player
- Vita Mavrič, Slovenian female chansonnier
