= Detela =

Detela is a Slovene surname. Notable people with the surname include:

- Fran Detela (1850–1926), Slovene writer
- Jure Detela (1951–1992), Slovene poet
