= Nova revija =

Nova revija may refer to:

- Nova revija (magazine), a magazine in Slovenia established in 1982
- Nova revija (publishing company), a publishing house in Slovenia
