= Janez Ramoveš =

Slovene poet and musician (born 1965)

- Born: 21 September 1965; Suša, Socialist Federal Republic of Yugoslavia (now in Slovenia)
- Occupations: Poet and musician
- Writing career
- Notable work: Skuz okn strejlam kurente
- Notable awards: Jenko Award; 2012 for Skuz okn strejlam kurente

Janez Ramoveš (born 21 September 1965) is a Slovene poet and musician. In 2012 he received the Jenko Award for his collection of poetry written in the Poljane dialect, Skuz okn strejlam kurente (I Shoot at Kurents Through the Window).

== Published works ==
- Božjastnice, (1990)
- Striptiz. Namesto Kim Basinger, (1995)
- Poročilo iz geta, (2001)
- Moja velika debela mama, (2001)
- Staroselski ciklus, (2006)
- Čreda, (2010)
- Skuz okn strejlam kurente, (2012)
