= Zoran Bognar =

Serbian poet and writer

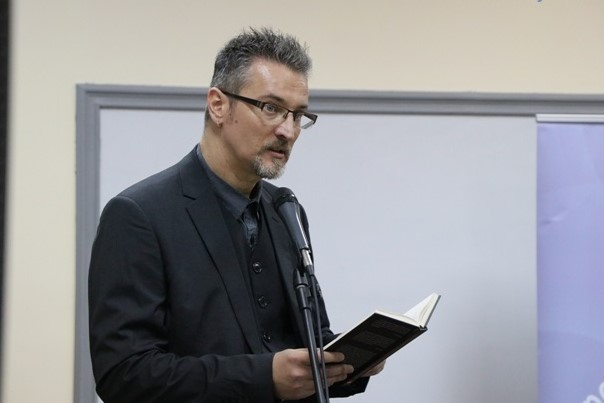
Zoran Bognar

Zoran Bognar (Serbian-Cyrillic: Зоран Богнар; born 30 January 1965 in Vukovar, SR Croatia, SFR Yugoslavia) is a Serbian poet and writer.

== Life and work ==
Zoran Bognar, Hungarian surname Bognar (which means Wheelwright) is considered to be one of the most creative and renowned representatives of contemporary Serbian poetry. More than 300 of his essays and literary reviews have already been published in many Serbian literary journals and newspapers such as Borba, Dnevnik and Politika, and more than 200 essays, reviews and studies have also been published about his work in recent decades, also a monograph Athletic pilgrimage to the Elysian fields of Zoran Bognar (Atletsko hodočašće nad jelisejskim vodama i poljima Zorana Bognara, 2002) by Vladan Panković (teacher) and Nikica Banić (poet), both from Inđija. Bognar has been working as literary editor of the publishing house Dereta for several years; he is current president of jury of the Miroslav Dereta Award since 2006, president of the Foundation for Preservation of Fine Arts – Ars Longa, member of the Association of Writers of Serbia and the PEN of Bosnia Hercegovina. The editions of New Deluge, New Noah's Ark, Elysian Trilogy and Constellations Under The Skin have also been published in Italian (1995, 1997, 1998 and 2001), Spanish (2002), French (2002) and Macedonian (2006) translations, selected poems in English and German editions (2000, 2003 and 2015), in the International Poetry Review (2003) of the University of North Carolina, in German, Polish and French anthologies (1999, 2008, 2011), in the Austrian and German literary journals Manuskripte (1999) and Akzente (2000), and in Ariel (2004) in Swedish. In 2002, the poet was Artist in Residence at Villa Waldberta in Feldafing, Germany. In addition to numerous Serbian literary awards, he received the Italian Vannelli Award 1997 of the same named publishing house in Verona (Edizione Vannelli), the Montenegrin Mediterranean Lion 1998 and the German Hubert Burda Award 1999. He lives in Belgrade.

== Bibliography (selection) ==
- Blues za šahovsku tablu (Chess Board Blues), poetry, Književna omladina Hrvatske, Vukovar 1986.
- Zemlja gospodari PODzemljom (Land under Rule of Underworld), poetry, Big-Ben, Sarajevo 1987.
- Psiho-striptiz (Psycho-Striptease), poetry, Panpublik, Belgrade 1988.
- Noć praznih ruku (Night of Empty Hands), novel, Panpublik, Belgrade 1989.
- Isus još uvek veruje YUdi (Jesus still believes in YUpeople; word play with Yugoslav country code and Serbian word ljudi), poetry, Koneks, Beograd 1990.
- Trgovci bioritma (Biorhythm Traders), poetry, Big-Ben, Sarajevo 1990.
- Miris plastičnog cveća (Smell of Plastic Flowers), poetry, Koneks, Belgrade 1992.
- Ako se mrtvi jednog dana vrate (When A Dead Man Returns One Day), poetry, Bagdala, Kruševac 1993.
- Južna strana istoka (The South Side Of East), Haiku poetry, Svetovi, Novi Sad 1993.
- Budno stanje sna (Awakened State of Dream), novel, Naučna knjiga, Belgrade 1993.
- Anonimna besmrtnost (Anonymous Immortality), poetry, Rad, Belgrade 1994.
- Novi potop : izabrane pesme 1984–1994 (New Deluge: selected poems 1984–1994), Draganić, Belgrade 1996, ISBN 86-441-0110-2.
- Novi Nojev kovčeg : Dopisivanje sa Apokalipsom (New Noah's Ark: Correspondence with Apocalypse), Prosveta, Belgrade 1997.
- Fotografije glasova : o fenomenima istorije duha i kulture (Talking Pictures: about the phenomena of the history of spirit and culture), essays, Bagdala, Kruševac 1997, ISBN 86-7087-178-5.
- Novi čovek (New Man), poetry, Prosveta, Belgrade 1999.
- Elizejska trilogija: poetsko hodočašće od letargije do liturgije (Elysian Trilogy: a poetic pilgrimage from lethargy to liturgy), Prosveta, Belgrade 2000.
- Protoclepsydra: A Selection of Poems, edited by Jamie Reid, DaDaBaBy Enterprises, North Vancouver 2000, ISBN 978-09-69889-72-4.
- Zoran Bognar, Maja Vidmar, Uroš Zupan – Junge Lyrik aus den Ländern Ost- und Südosteuropas (Young Poetry From The Countries of Eastern and Southeastern Europe), Edition Petrarca, Herkner, Konstanz and Munich 1999, translated by Žarko Radaković, Peter Handke, Elke Schwarz-Mahmuti, Aslan Mahmuti and Fabjan Hafner, book cover designed by Iga Bielejec.
- Albedo (Albedo), poetry, Dereta, Belgrade 2002, ISBN 86-7346-237-1.
- La trilogie Elyséenne, poetry, La Pyramide, Montreal 2002.
- Aura (Aura), poetry, Dereta, Belgrade 2003, ISBN 86-7346-334-3.
- Alhemija (Alchemy), poetry, Dereta, Belgrade 2005, ISBN 86-7346-512-5.
- Tečni kristal : antologija srpskog mikroeseja XX veka (Liquid Crystal: anthology of Serbian micro-essay of 20th Century), Dereta, Belgrade 2006, ISBN 86-7346-520-6.
- Sazvežđa ispod kože (Constellations Under The Skin), poetry, Zalihica, Sarajevo 2007, ISBN 978-9958-787-14-0.
- Lavirint kruga (Circle Maze), poetry, Book, Belgrade 2010, ISBN 978-86-7572-107-9.
- Wszystkie chwile są tu i nic być nie przestaje: antologia poezji serbskiej XX wieku, Volume 2, edited by Grzegorz Łatuszyński, Oficyna Wydawnicza Agawa, Warsaw 2008, ISBN 978-83-85571-45-2.
- Vukovarske elegije : 1984-2010 (Vukovarian Elegies), poetry, Balkanski književni glasnik, Belgrade 2011, ISBN 978-86-87327-13-9.
- Anthologie de la poésie serbe contemporaine, edited by Boris Lazić, Un Infini cercle bleu & Udruženje književnika Srpske, Paris and Banja Luka 2011,
  ISBN 978-2-35405-005-4.
- Ejdetske slike : poetsko-fenomenološki mikroeseji, eseji i refleksije 1982-2012 (Eidetic images: poetic-phenomenological micro-essays, essays and reflections 1982-2012), essays, Službeni glasnik, Belgrade 2012, ISBN 978-86-519-1357-3.
- Insomnija, bele noći (Insomnia, White Nights), poetry, Draganić, Belgrade 2013, ISBN 978-86-441-0834-4.
- Zebnja nam ide za petama i flertuje sa našim senkama : orfejski portreti melanholije 1984-2014 (Fear Is On Our Trail and Flirting With Our Shadows: orpheic portraits of melancholy), poetry, Balkanski književni glasnik, Belgrade 2014, ISBN 978-86-87327-15-3.
- Albedo, Aura, Alchemy : selected poems 1984-2014, Balkanski književni glasnik, Belgrade 2015, ISBN 978-86-87327-17-7.

== Serbian Awards ==
- Pečat varoši sremskokarlovačke 1993 (Seal of Sremski Karlovci)
- Matićev šal 1994 (Matić's Scarf)
- Stevan Pešić Award 1994
- Blažo Šćepanović Award 1996
- Rade Drainac Award 1999
- Isidora Sekulić Award 1999
- Srboljub Mitić Award 2000
- Milutin Uskoković Award 2003
- Slobodan Džunić Award 2006
- Milan Bogdanović Award 2009
- Dimitrije Mitrinović Award 2010
- Visoko specijalno priznanje Akademije Ivo Andrić 2010 (Highly Special Award of the Academy Ivo Andrić)
- Kočićevo pero 2013
- ULUPUDS Award 2013
- Miodrag Draganić Award 2013
- Vasko Popa Award 2013
- Zlatni beočug 2013
- Jovan Skerlić Award 2018
