= Veronika Award =

The Veronika Award (Slovene: Veronikina nagrada) is a literary award awarded yearly for the best Slovene poetry collection in Slovenia. It has been bestowed since 1997 by the Municipality of Celje at the Veronika Festival at Celje Castle. The festival and the award are named after Veronika of Desenice, wife of Frederick II, Count of Celje, accused of witchcraft, incarcerated in Ojstrica Castle and murdered in around 1425. The winner receives a financial award. Since 2005, a separate Poetry Gold Medal has been bestowed on a poet for their life achievement contributing to the richness of Slovene poetry, language and culture.

== Veronika Award laureates ==
Year	Author	Poetry Collection	Title in English	Publisher
2016	Ana Makuc	Ljubica Rolanda Barthesa	Roland Barthes' Lover	KUD Apokalipsa
2015	Meta Kušar	Vrt	Garden	KUD Sodobnost International
2014	Petra Kolmančič	P(l)ast za p(l)astjo	Layer Upon Layer (Trap After Trap)	Založba Pivec
2013	Karlo Hmeljak	Krčrk		LUD Literatura
2012	Primož Čučnik	Mikado	Mikado	Beletrina
2011	Barbara Korun	Pridem takoj	Back soon	KUD Apokalipsa
2010	Andrej Medved	Razlagalec sanj	Interpreter of Dreams	KUD Apokalipsa
2009	Jože Snoj	Kažipoti brezpotij	Signposts to Nowhere	Nova Revija
2008	Milan Dekleva	Audrey Hepburn, slišiš metlo budističnega učenca?	Audrey Hepburn, Can You Hear the Broom of the Buddhist Student?	Cankarjeva založba
2007	Taja Kramberger	Vsakdanji pogovori	Everyday Conversations	Center za slovenski književnost
2007	Tone Pavček	Ujedanke: obrazi naše vsakdanjosti		Mohorjeva družba
2006	Ervin Fritz	Ogrlica iz rad		Mladinska knjiga
2005	Ivo Svetina	Lesbos	Lesbos	Cankarjeva založba
2004	Erika Vouk	Opis slike	Picture Description	Litera
2003	Milan Dekleva	V živi zob	Into The Open Wound	Cankarjeva založba
2002	Miklavž Komelj	Rosa	Rosa	Mladinska knjiga
2001	Milan Jesih	Jambi	Iambi	Mladinska knjiga
2000	Ciril Zlobec	Samo ta dan imam	I Only Have This Day	Prešernova družba
2000	Marjan Strojan	Parniki v dežju	Steamers in the Rain	Cankarjeva založba
1999	Josip Osti	Kraški Narcis	Karstic Narcissus	Študentska založba
1998	Aleš Šteger	Kašmir	Kashmir	Nova Revija
1997	Iztok Osojnik	Razgledice za Darjo	Postcards for Darja	Državna Založba Slovenije

=== Poetry Gold Medal recipients ===
- 2005 - Ciril Zlobec
- 2006 - Tone Pavček
- 2007 - Kajetan Kovič
- 2008 - Miroslav Košuta
- 2009 - Ivan Minatti
- 2010 - Neža Maurer
- 2011 - Veno Taufer
- 2012 - Svetlana Makarovič
- 2013 - Niko Grafenauer
- 2014 - Tone Kuntner
- 2015 - Gustav Januš
- 2016 - Marko Kravos
- 2017 - Andrej Brvar
