= Simona Škrabec =

Slovene literary critic, essayist and translator

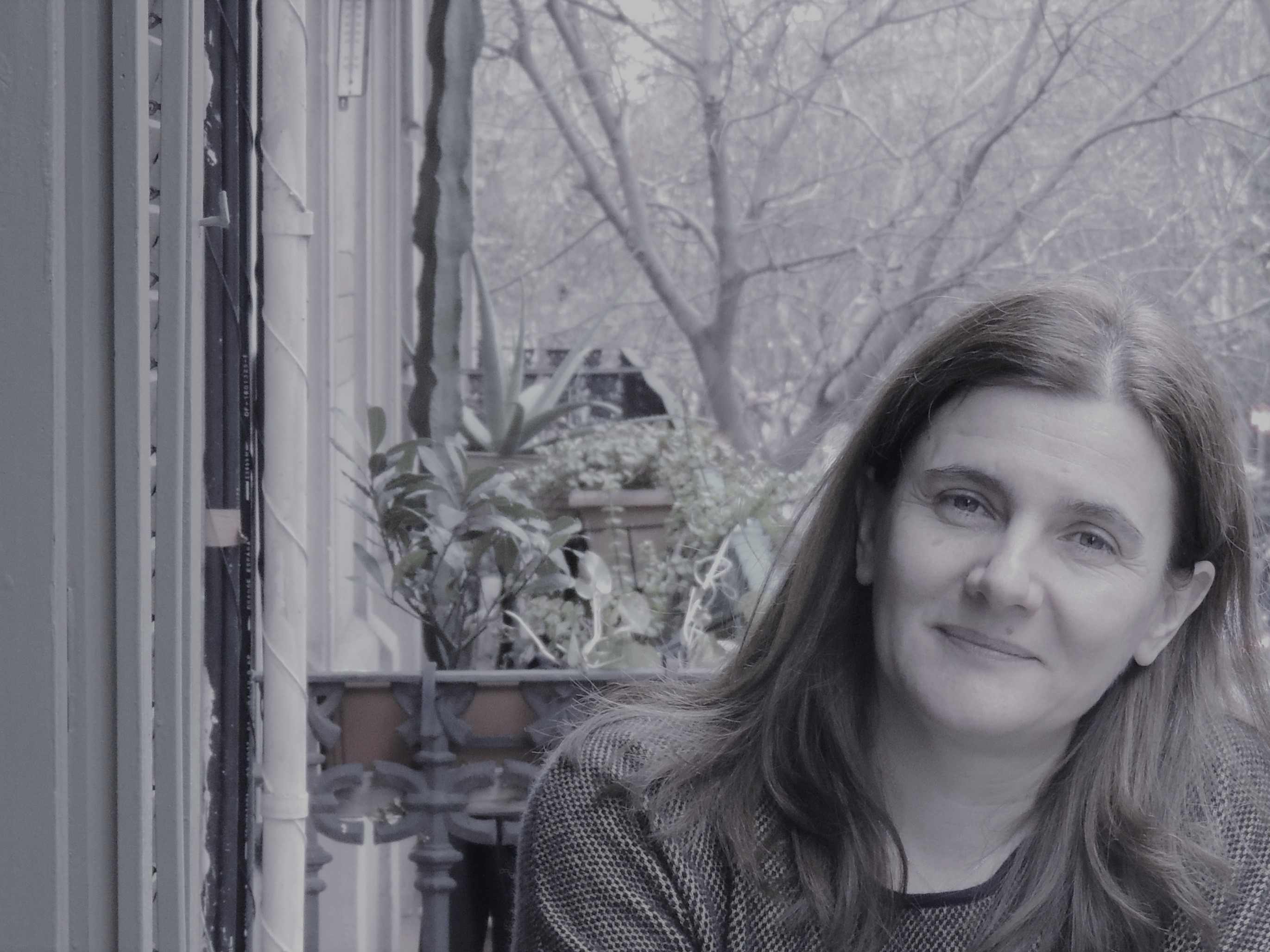
Simona Škrabec, Barcelona, 2019

Simona Škrabec (Ljubljana, Slovenia, 1968) is a Slovene literary critic, essayist and translator who lives and works in Barcelona. She spent her childhood in the small town of Ribnica in the region of Lower Carniola. She has lived in Barcelona since 1992. Skrabec has translated several books from Slovenian to Catalan and from Catalan to Slovenian. In addition to these two languages, she is fluent in Spanish, Serbo-Croatian, German, English and French.

== Life and career ==
Simona Škrabec was born in Ljubljana, Slovenia. She has lived in Barcelona since 1992. At the University of Ljubljana she received a BA in German philology and comparative literature. In 2002, she obtained a PhD in comparative literature at the Autonomous University of Barcelona (UAB). She is a professor at Open University of Catalonia (UOC) in Barcelona. Her main interests are the European literature of 20th century and the relation of literature with the construction of historic memory and identity. In 2014, she was elected chair of PEN International's Translation and Linguistic Rights Committee.

She is the author of the books L'estirp de la solitud (Lineage of Solitude, 2003), L'atzar de la lluita (Of Chance and Struggle, 2005) and Una Pàtria prestada (Borrowed Homeland, 2017). With Arnau Pons she directed an extensive project about cultural exchange between Germany and Catalonia in the 20th century (Grenzen sind Straßen, 2007–2008, 2 vols.).

She has translated more than thirty books, including several books of Serbian and Slovenian authors into Catalan and Spanish (Kiš, Jančar, Pahor, and Šalamun), and the translation of most important Catalan authors (Moncada, Cabré, Ferrater, Marçal, etc.) into Slovenian.

In translation she also participated in the joint study To Be Translated or Not to Be (2007, directed by Esther Allen) about the situation of literary translation in the globalized world and in the volume Constel·lacions variables (Variable constellations, 2012, with Teresa Irribaren) about the impact of digital media in internationalization of literature. In 2016 she directed the PEN International report Culture's Oxygen about the publishing industry in minority languages, commissioned by UNESCO.

She contributes essays and articles about literature in academic and cultural journals and is also a regular literary critic with various Barcelona based newspapers. She has been a member of the editorial board at the humanities journal L'Espill of the University of Valencia since 2007. She has also acted as organizer of several cultural events and symposiums, as a result of which she edited the books Diàlegs sense fronteres (Dialogues without Borders, 2011), about foreign authors established in Barcelona and writing in Catalan, and Les distàncies d'Europa (The Distances in Europe, 2013), an interdisciplinary quest about Europe's future.

== Publications ==
=== PhD in comparative literature ===
- Geografia imaginària. Els marcs identitaris en el cas de Centreeuropa(2002). Published 2004 by Afers, Valencia.

=== Authored books ===
- Torno del bosc amb les mans tenyides. Barcelona: L'Avenç (2019)
- Una patria prestada. Lectures de fragilitat en la literatura catalana. València: Publicacions de la Universitat de València (2017)
- L’atzar de la lluita. El concepte d’Europa Central al segle XX, Catarroja; Barcelona; Palma: Afers (2005)
- Estirp de la solitud. Barcelona: Institut d'Estudis Catalans (2002). [Award Josep Carner for Literary Theory of Institut d’Estudis Catalans, 2001].

=== Research reports ===
- Culture’s Oxygen. Developing the Minority-language creative writing industry in Kenya, Haiti, Serbia and Nigeria. An inter-regional research, advocacy and development programme. London: PEN International; UNESCO (2016)
- To be translated or not to be, collective volume directed by Esther Allen. Barcelona: PEN and Institut Ramon Llull (2007)
- La literatura catalana i la traducció en un món globalitzat (Catalan Literature and Translation in a Globalized World). with Carme Arenas. Translated by per Sarah Yandell. Barcelona: Institució de les Lletres Catalanes; Institut Ramon Llull (2006)

=== Coordinator of collective volumes ===
- Carrers de frontera, Passatges de la cultura alemanya a la cultura catalana, Volume II, curated with Arnau Pons. Barcelona: GenCat, Institut Ramon Llull (2008)
- Carrers de frontera. Passatges de la cultura alemanya a la cultura catalana, Volume I, curated with Arnau Pons. Barcelona: GenCat, Institut Ramon Llull (2007)

=== Translations (selection) ===
==== Catalan translations ====
- Ernest Cassirer; Martin Heidegger. «La controvèrsia de Davos». L’Espill, 54-55, p. 191-210. (2017)
- Tomaž Šalamun. Balada per a la Metka Krašovec [Balada za Metko Krašovec, 1981]. Barcelona: LaBreu. (2016)
- Danilo Kiš. Una tomba per a Boris Davidovič [Grobnica Borisa Davidoviča, 1976]. Manresa: Angle (2016)
- Achille Mbembe. «Necropolítica». L’Espill, 53, p. 5-36. (2016)
- Snježana Kodrić. «El serbocroat avui, entre aspiracions polítiques I fets lingüístics». L’Espill, 49, p. 35-45. (2015)
- Brane Mozetič. El país de les bombes, el país dels prats [Dežela bomb, dežela trav, 2013]. Barcelona: Edicions Bellaterra. (2014)
- Drago Jančar. Aurora boreal. Barcelona: Edicions 1984. (2014)
- Franco Moretti. «Sobre l’evolució literària». L'Espill, 43, p. 151-167. (2013)
- Aleš Debeljak. «La república de les lletres». L’Espill, 41, p. 113-115. (2012)
- Fredric Jameson. «La literatura del Tercer Món». L’Espill, 35, p. 27-50. (2010)
- Brane Mozetič. Banalitats [Banalije, 2003; Še banalije, 2005, selecció]. Vic: Cafè Central; Eumo (Jardins de Samarcanda, 54). (2009)
- Aleš Debeljak. La neu de l’any passat [Somrak idolov, Lanski sneg, Evropa brez Evropejcev, selection] Palma: Lleonard Muntaner (Traus, 4). (2007)
- Svetlana Makarovič. El forn d’en Musaranya [Pekarna Mišmaš, 1974]. Illustrators by Mercè Arànega. Barcelona: Barcanova. (2006)
- Drago Jančar. Katarina, el paó i el jesuïta [Katarina, pav in jezuit, 2000]. Lleida: Pagès Editors. (2005)
- Boris Pahor. Necròpolis [Nekropola, 1997]. Lleida: Pagès Editors. (2004)
- Svetlana Makarovič; Brane Mozetič. He somniat que havies mort. Barcelona: ILC i Emboscall [with Vicent Alonso, Staša Briški, Aurora Calvet, Jaume Creus, Feliu Formosa, Txema Martínez, Melcion Mateu, Francesc Parcerisas, Tanja Pavlica and Iolanda Pelegrí]. (2004)
- Danilo Kiš. Una tomba per a Boris Davidovič [Grobnica Borisa Davidoviča, 1976]. Manresa: Angle. (2003)
- Drago Jančar. La mirada de l'àngel [Pogled angela, 1992; “Smrt pri Mariji Snežni”]. Manresa: Angle. (2003)

==== Spanish translations ====
- Goran Vojnović. Yugoslavia, mi tierra [Jugoslavija, moja dežela, 2012]. Barcelona: Asteroide. (2017)
- Daša Drndić. Trieste [Sonnenschein, 2007]. Madrid: Automática. (2015)
- Drago Jančar. Zumbidos en la cabeza [Zvenenje v glavi, 1998]. Madrid: Sexto Piso. (2015)
- Brane Mozetič. El país de les bombas, el país de los prados. Barcelona: Edicions Bellaterra. (2014)
- Svetlana Makarovič. La tia Magda [Teta Magda, 1999]. Barcelona: Alfaguara. (2005)

==== Slovenian translations ====
- Maria Barbal. Intimna dežela [País íntim, 2005]. Ljubljana: Študentska Založba. (2016)
- Manuel Molins. Abu Magrib [Abu Magrib, 2002]. Sodobna drama v Španiji. Maribor: Litera, 99-216. (2014)
- Blai Bonet. Morje [El mar, 1958]. Ljubljana: Center za slovensko književnost. (2014)
- Josep Maria Benet i Jornet . Želja [Desig, 1991]. Sodobna drama v Španiji. Maribor: Litera, 27-98. (2014)
- Llorenç Villalonga. Bearn ali sobana porcelanastih lutk [Bearn o la sala de nines, 1956]. Ljubljana: Študentska Založba (Beletrina, 329). (2012)
- Maria-Mercè Marçal. Pasijon po Renée Vivien [La passió de Renée Vivien, 1994]. Ljubljana: Škuc (Lambda; 91). (2011)
- Maria Mercè Marçal. Staljeni led [Desglaç, 1988]. Ljubljana: Škuc, (Lambda, 78). (2009)
- Maria Barbal. Kamen v melišču [Pedra de tartera, 1985]. Ljubljana: Študentska Založba (Beletrina, 210). (2008)
- Gabriel Ferrater. Ženske in dnevi [Les dones i els dies, selecció, 1968] Ljubljana: Center za slovensko književnost, (Aleph, 116). (2007)
- Jaume Cabré. Evnuhova senca [L’ombra de l’eunuc, 1996]. Ljubljana: Študenska Založba (Beletrina, 149). (2006)
- Lluís Maria Todó. Igra izmišljevanja [El joc del mentider, 1994]. Ljubljana: Center za slovensko književnost (Aleph, 41). (2005)
- Jesús Moncada. Proti toku [Camí de sirga, 1988]. Ljubljana: Študentska Založba (Beletrina, 110). (2004)
- J.V. Foix. Dnevnik iz leta 1918 [Darrer comunicat, 1970; Tocant a mà, 1972]. Ljubljana: Center za slovensko književnost (Aleph, 84). (2003)
- Pere Calders. Kronike prikrite resnice [Cròniques de la veritat oculta, 1955]. Ljubljana: Center za slovensko književnost (Aleph, 71). (2002)

== Communications and presentations (selection) ==
- #ProtectLinguists event at the UN Headquarters in New York. [with Linda Fitchett, Ms. María Bassols, Bill Miller, Dr. Maya Hess, Betsy Fisher, Lucio Bagnulo and Maître Caroline Decroix]. (New York, 2019)
- Debat sobre [la] cultura catalana. [with Maria Bohigas, Najat El Hachmi, Àngels Margarit and Mercè Picornell]. Centre de Cultura Contemporània de Barcelona (CCCB). (Barcelona, 2019)
- La traducción literaria como oxigeno para la cultura. ("The literary translation as highly for the culture"). Inaugural Conference of the degree in translation andapplied languages UOC/UVic-UCC, of the master of digital editing and master's degree intranslation. Open University of Catalonia (UOC), Sala Josep Laporta (Barcelona, 2017)
- Gravar el nom a l’escorça d’un arbre ("Record the name in the bark of a tree"). Inaugural Conference of the academic year. Pompeu Fabra University. Faculty of translation and interpreting, communication Campus Auditorium Poblenou (Barcelona, 2015)
- Importem cultura, exportem cultura ("We import culture, we export culture"). [with Francesc Parcerisas and Joaquim Gestí]. XXII Seminar on Translation in Catalonia "Translators, pioneers of the culture".Associació d'Escriptors en Llengua Catalana (AELC), Institució de les Lletres Catalanes (ILC), CCCB. (Barcelona, 2014)
- El país i la ficció ("The country and fiction") [with Sergi Belbel, Laura Borràs, Francesc Serés and Albert Serra]. III Critical Reflections "Changes in paradigm: challenges and opportunities of the culture". Arts Santa Mònica, Generalitat de Catalunya, Departament de Cultura (Barcelona, 2011)
