= Primož Čučnik =

Slovene poet, editor and translator

- Born: 1 June 1971 (age 55); Ljubljana, Socialist Federal Republic of Yugoslavia (now in Slovenia)
- Occupations: Poet, editor and translator
- Writing career
- Notable works: Delo in dom, Kot dar, Mikado
- Notable awards: Prešeren Foundation Award; 2008 for Delo in dom Jenko Award; 2011 for Kor dar Veronika Award; 2012 for Mikado

Primož Čučnik (born 1 June 1971) is a Slovene poet, editor and translator. He has published numerous poetry collections.

Čučnik was born in Ljubljana in 1971. He studied philosophy and sociology of culture at the University of Ljubljana and works as an editor at the literary journal Literatura.

He won the Prešeren Foundation Award in 2008 for his poetry collection Delo in dom and the Jenko Award in 2011 for his poetry collection Kot dar. In 2012 he won the Veronika Award for his collection entitled Mikado.

== Poetry collections ==
- Dve zimi (1999)
- Ritem v rôkah (2002)
- Oda na manhatanski aveniji (2003)
- Akordi (2004)
- Nova okna (2005)
- Sekira v medu:izbrane pesmi (2006)
- Delo in dom (2007)
- Kot dar (2010)
- Mikado (2012)

== Essays ==
- Spati na krilu (2008)
