= Suša, Gorenja Vas–Poljane =

Suša
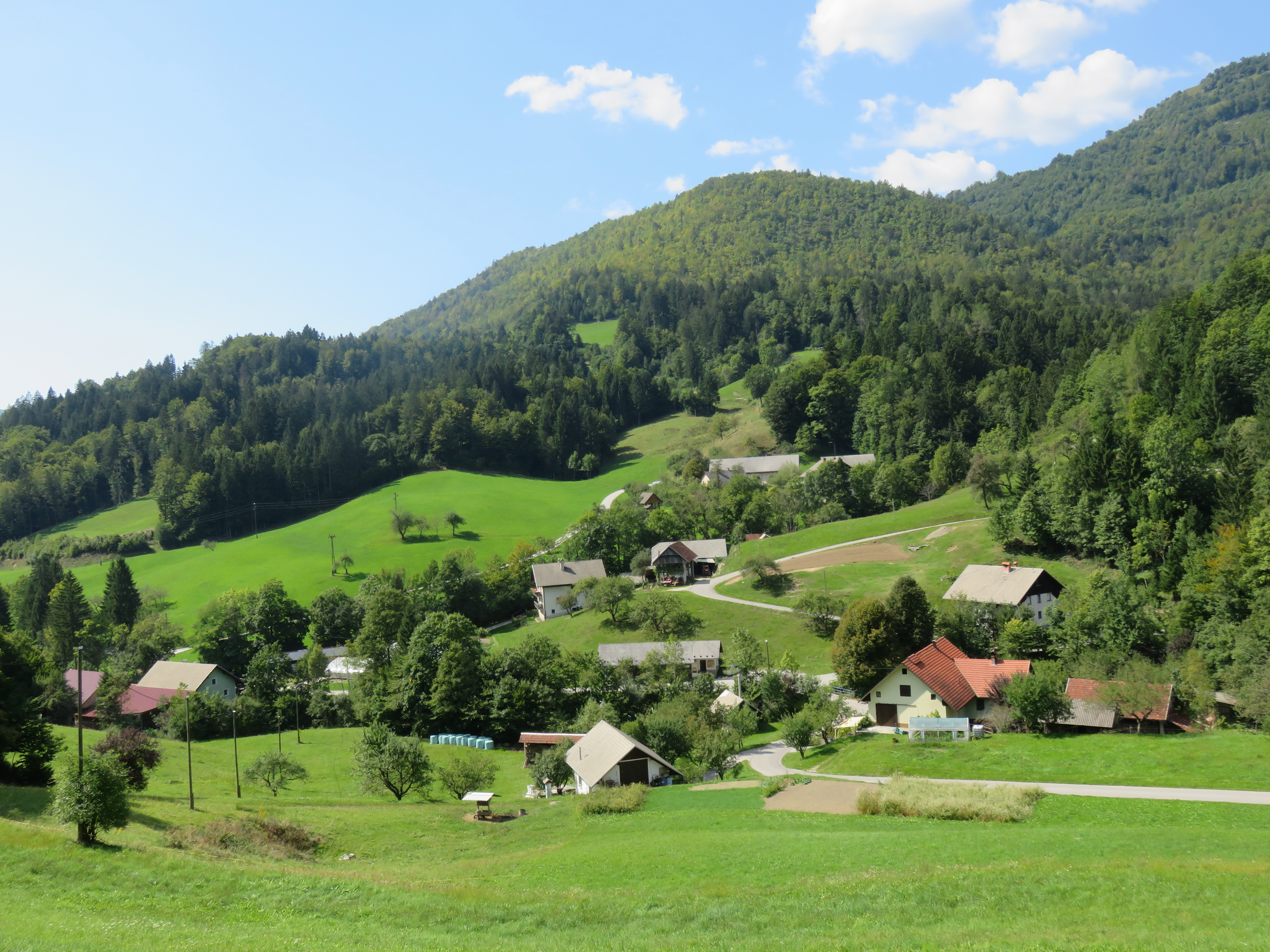

- Location in Slovenia
- Coordinates: 46°8′10.73″N 14°8′16.88″E
- Country: Slovenia
- Traditional region: Upper Carniola
- Statistical region: Upper Carniola
- Municipality: Gorenja Vas–Poljane

Area
  - Total: 1.21 km^{2} (0.47 sq mi)
- Elevation: 490.3 m (1,609 ft)

Population (2020)
  - Total: 49
  - Density: 40/km^{2} (100/sq mi)

Suša (pronounced [ˈsuːʃa]) is a small settlement northeast of Hotavlje in the Municipality of Gorenja Vas–Poljane in the Upper Carniola region of Slovenia. It lies below the southeast slope of Mount Blegoš, at the confluence of Karlovščica and Zarobarščica creeks, where they join to form Logarščica Creek.

== Name ==
Like similar toponyms (e.g., Suha), the name of the settlement is derived from the adjective suh 'dry', referring either to an intermittent stream and the settlement beside it, or to a notably dry area.

== History ==
During the Second World War, Suša was exposed to the last German offensive, from 19 March to 5 April 1945. On 25 March 1945 the Miklavčič farm (known as the Mlinar Farm, Slovene: pri Mlinarju) at Suša no. 2 was plundered and burned by German and Slovene Home Guard forces because Janez Miklavčič had supplied the Partisans with flour. The family and their six children were shot; they are commemorated by a memorial in Hotavlje.
