= Marjan Strojan =

Slovene poet, journalist and translator (born 1949)

- Born: 16 August 1949 (age 77)
- Occupations: Poet, journalist and translator
- Writing career
- Notable work: Parniki v dežju
- Notable awards: Veronika Award; 2000 for Parniki v dežju

Marjan Strojan (born 16 August 1949) is a Slovene poet, journalist and translator. He studied Comparative literature and Philosophy at the University of Ljubljana and worked as a journalist at the Slovene section of the BBC World Service and as a film critic and literary editor at Radio Slovenija. He has written a number of volumes of poetry and translated Beowulf, Geoffrey Chaucer's Canterbury Tales, Milton's Paradise Lost and Sonnets as well as poems by William Shakespeare, Robert Frost, James Joyce, Sydney Lea and others into Slovene. He has also edited and in part translated the first comprehensive anthology of English poetry in Slovene. Strojan has written a number of essays, papers and studies on English poetry and contributed to the South Slavic Miltoniana (v. Milton in Translation, OUP, 2016). From 2009 to 2016 he was the president of the Slovenian section of PEN International.

In 2000 he won the Veronika Award for his poetry volume Parniki v dežju (Steamers in the Rain), in 1995 and 2003 Sovre Translation Awards for Beowulf and Milton's Paradise Lost and the Prešeren Foundation Award for The Canterbury Tales in 2015.

== Poetry collections ==
- V vrtu, mesec (In the Garden, the Moon, MK) 2025
- Hribi, oblaki, lepo pozdrave (Hills, Clouds, Greetings, MK) 2019 OCLC 1117717910
- U većernjoj svetlosti (In the Evening Light, tr. by Milan Djordjević) 2018
- Pesmi iz iger (Songs from Plays) 2017 OCLC 1517344367
- Dells and Hollows, tr. by the Author, 2015 OCLC 1038038412
- V vetru in dežju (In Wind and Rain) 2015 OCLC 938563004
- El libro azul y otras poemas, tr. by Teresa Kores 2012 OCLC 898601107
- In Unfriendly Weather, Four Slovenian Poets, 2011 OCLC 813580757
- Vreme, kamni, krave (Weather, Stones, Cows), 2010 OCLC 905305448
- Pokrajine s senco (Landscapes with Shadows), 2006 OCLC 448674859
- Dan, ko me ljubiš (The Day You Love Me), 2003 OCLC 446635727
- Vyleti do prirody, tr. by František Benhart, 2002 OCLC 445891624
- Parniki v dežju (Steamers in the Rain), 1999 OCLC 445110834
- Drobne nespečnosti (Small Insomnias), 1991 OCLC 438519642
- Izlet v naravo (Excursion into Nature), 1990 OCLC 440739728
