= Kaja Teržan =

Slovenian poet

- Born: Kaja Teržan; 1986 (age 39–40); Kranj, Slovenia
- Occupation: Writer
- Writing career
- Genres: poetry, novelist
- Notable works: Circle, The Reckoning

Kaja Teržan was born in 1986 in Kranj, Slovenia, a Slovenian writer, poet, and novelist and the 2019 recipient of the Jenko Award.

== Life and education ==
Kaja Teržan was born in 1986 in Kranj, Slovenia. She spent kindergarten and the first two years of primary school in the suburbs of Stockholm, Sweden, after which she moved with her family to Škofja Loka, where she completed her primary education. At the Faculty of Arts in Ljubljana, she began studying art history and sociology, but left her studies early to focus on the practice of contemporary dance, performance. She works as a teacher.

== Writing ==
Delta, her first poetry collection was published began in 2015 the Centre for Slovenian Literature, in the Aleph collection. The same year, she presented it at the Mediterranea Festival in Milan.

In 2018 her second collection Circle (Krog) was published. It was nominated for the Critics’ Sieve Award and received the Jenko Award for the best poetry collection of the past two years. Her collection Someday I'll Have Time was published in 2021.

=== Poetry ===
- Delta (2015)
- Circle (2018)
- I’ll Have Time (2021)

=== Novel ===
- The Reckoning (2015)

The Reckoning begins as a collage of fragments of memories and dreams. Through a dialogue with a fish—a carp—the inner and outer worlds, the real and the imagined places, intertwine in alternation, seeking to position the conflicts that arise in the transition from the inner to the outer world. The search for work, home, love, and meaning in the third part of the novel unfolds in an essayistic-poetic outpouring that leads to a confrontation in the final dialogue: a fundamental memory opens, from which a new branch of life may grow.

The raw social critique, questions of class and gender, make it clear that the surface of this hypocritical society is frozen. On the path of seeking truth and striving for self-recognition, the narrator finds true refuge in a journey through the forest and encounters with trees and animals.

== See also ==
- List of Slovenian writers
