= Boris A. Novak =

Slovene poet, dramaturge and editor (born 1953)

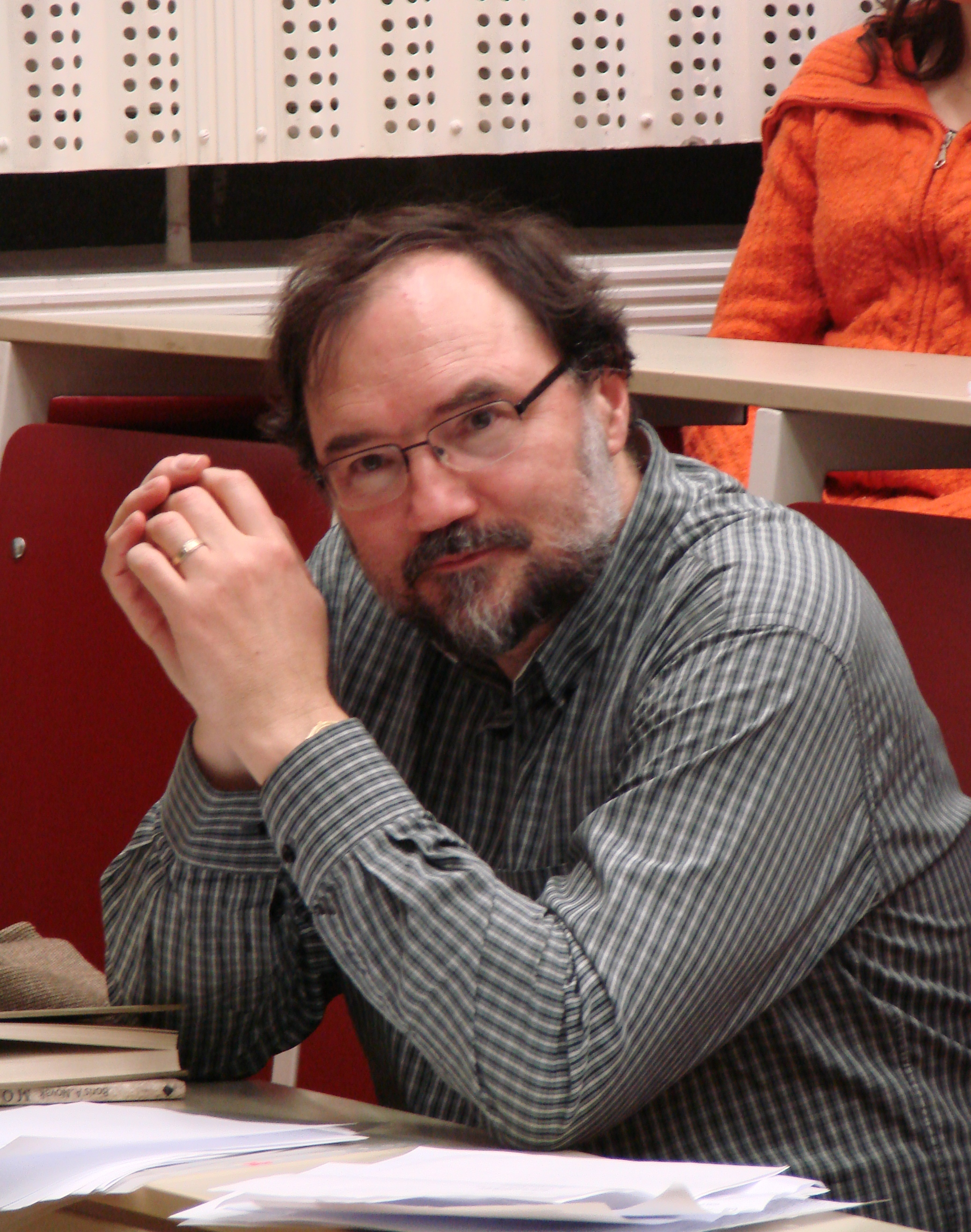
- Boris A. Novak in 2009
- Born: 3 December 1953 (age 72); Belgrade, Socialist Federal Republic of Yugoslavia (now in Serbia)
- Occupations: Poet, dramaturge and editor
- Writing career
- Notable works: Stihožitje, 1001 stih, Mojster nespečnosti
- Notable awards: Prešeren Foundation Award; 1984 for 1001 stih Jenko Award; 1995 for Mojster nespečnosti

Boris A. Novak, full name Boris Ante Novak, (born 3 December 1953) is a Slovene poet, dramaturge and editor.

Novak was born in 1953 in Belgrade where he also spent his early childhood. He completed secondary schooling in Ljubljana and studied comparative literature and philosophy at the University of Ljubljana and worked as a dramaturge at the Slovene National Theatre and as a lecturer at the university. He has also been involved in humanitarian work and was in 2002 elected vice-president of International PEN.

He won the Prešeren Foundation Award in 1984 for his poetry collection 1001 stih (1001 verses). and the Jenko Award in 1995 for the collection Mojster nespečnosti (Master of Insomnia).

== Poetry collections ==
- Stihožitje, (1977)
- Hči spomina, (1981)
- 1001 stih, (1983)
- Kronanje,(1984)
- Vrtnar tišine - Gardener of Silence, bilingual collection (1990)
- Oblike sveta, (1991)
- Stihija, (1991)
- Mojster nespečnosti, (1995)
- Oblike srca, (1997)
- Odsotnost, (1999)
- Alba, (1999)
- Odmev, (2000)
- Žarenje, (2003)
- Obredi slovesa, (2005)
- Dlaneno platno, (2006)
- MOM – Mala Osebna Mitologija, (2007)
- Satje, (2010)
- Definicije, (2013)
- Oblike duha, (2016)
- Vrata nepovrata – epos (1st book: Zemljevidi domotožja, 2014; 2nd book: Čas očetov, 2015; 3rd book: Bivališča duš, 2017)
- Lunin Koledar, (2020)
- Svoboda je glagol, (2022)

== Poetry for children ==
- Prebesedimo besede!, (1981)
- Domišljija je povsod doma, (1984)
- Periskop, (1989)
- Blabla, (1995)
- Zarja časa, (1997)
- Čarovnije sveta, (1999)
- Kako rastejo stvari, (2004)
- Vserimje, (2012)
