= Erika Vouk =

Slovenian poet and translator

- Born: 1941 (age 84–85)
- Occupations: poet and translator
- Writing career
- Notable work: Opis slike
- Notable awards: Jenko Award; 2002 for Opis slike Veronika Award; 2004 for Valovanje

Erika Vouk (1941 – June 2026) was a Slovene poet and translator.

She won both the Jenko Award in 2002 and the Veronika Award in 2004 for her poetry collection Opis slike. In 2024 she received the Grand Prešeren Award for her lifetime achievement and was only the second poet to do so after Svetlana Makarovič.

== Poetry collections ==
- Bela Evridika (1984)
- Anima (1990)
- Belo drevo (2000)
- Opis slike (2002)
- Album (2003)
- Valovanje (2003)
- Z zamahom ptice neka roka slika (2007)
- Rubin (2008)
