= Barbara Korun =

Slovene poet (born 1963)

- Born: 1963 (age 62–63); Ljubljana, Socialist Federal Republic of Yugoslavia (now in Slovenia)
- Occupation: Poet
- Writing career
- Notable works: Ostrina miline, Pridem takoj
- Notable awards: Veronika Award; 2011 for Pridem takoj

Barbara Korun (born 1963) is a Slovene poet. She is one of the leading figures in the generation of radical young women poets in Slovenia and her poems have also been translated into English and published in the US and Ireland (translated by Theo Dorgan).

Korun was born in Ljubljana in 1963. She studied Slovene language and Comparative literature at the University of Ljubljana and worked as a lecturer and dramaturge. Her poems have been published in literary journals and anthologies both at home and abroad and she regularly appears at literary festivals and poetry readings.

In 2011 she received the Veronika Award for her poetry collection Pridem takoj.

== Poetry collections ==
- Ostrina miline (The Edge of Grace), 1999
- Zapiski iz podmizja (Notes from under the Table), 2003
- Razpoke (Fissures), 2004
- Pridem takoj (Back soon), 2011
- Čećica, motenja od ljubezni, 2014
- Vmes, 2016
- Idioritmija, 2021
