= Iztok Osojnik =

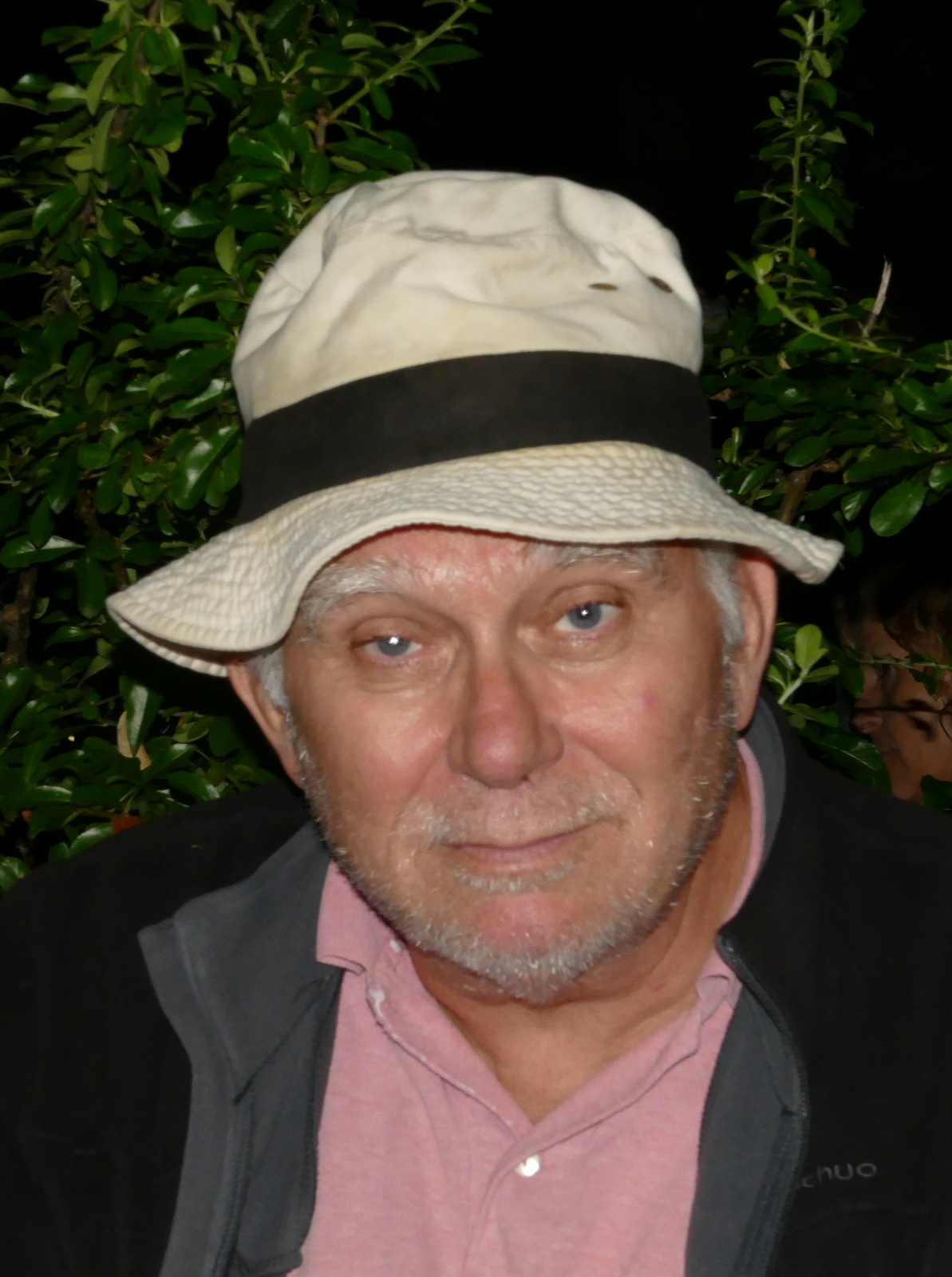
- Born: 27 July 1951 (age 75); Ljubljana, Socialist Federal Republic of Yugoslavia
- Occupations: Poet and essayist
- Writing career
- Notable works: Klesani kamni, Razgledice za Darjo
- Notable awards: Jenko Award; 1996 for Klesani kamni Veronika Award; 1997 for Razgledice za Darjo

Iztok Osojnik (born 27 July 1951) is a Slovene poet and essayist. Between 1997 and 2004 he was the director of the Vilenica International Literary Festival organized by the Slovene Writers' Association.

Osojnik was born in Ljubljana in 1951. He studied comparative literature at the University of Ljubljana under the supervision of the literary historian and philosopher Dušan Pirjevec. In his college years he collaborated with the poet Jure Detela and sociologist Iztok Saksida in publishing their Podrealistični manifest (The Sub-Realist Manifesto) in 1979 and later participated in the avantgarde group Pisarna Aleph (Aleph Office). Between 1980 and 1982 he continued his graduate studies at Kansai Gaidai University in Osaka, Japan. In 2000 he was a fellow of the Cambridge Seminar on Contemporary English Writers and in 2001 a fellow of the Goethe Institute in Berlin. Between 2002 and 2003 he visited the US on a Fulbright Fellowship.

He has published several collections of poetry. In 1996 he received the Jenko Award for his poetry collection Klesani kamni (Carved Stones). His poems have been translated into English, German, French, Italian, Croatian, Hungarian, Hebrew, Macedonian, Malay, Lithuanian, Polish, Portuguese, and Romanian.

Osojnik lives and works in Ljubljana.

== Bibliography ==
- Nasmeh Mone Lize (Mona Lisa's Smile)
- Temni julij (Dark July)
- Nekoč je bila Amerika (Once upon a Time There Was America)
- Iz Novega sveta (From the New World)
- Gospod Danes (Mister Today)
- Zgodba o Dušanu Pirjevcu in meni (The Story of Dušan Pirjevec and Myself)
- Spleen Berlina (The Spleen of Berlin)

== Works in English ==
- Alluminations (2000)
- And Some Things Happen for the first Time (2001)
- New and Selected Poems (2010)
- Elsewhere (2011)
