= Miklavž Komelj =

Slovene poet and art historian (born 1973)

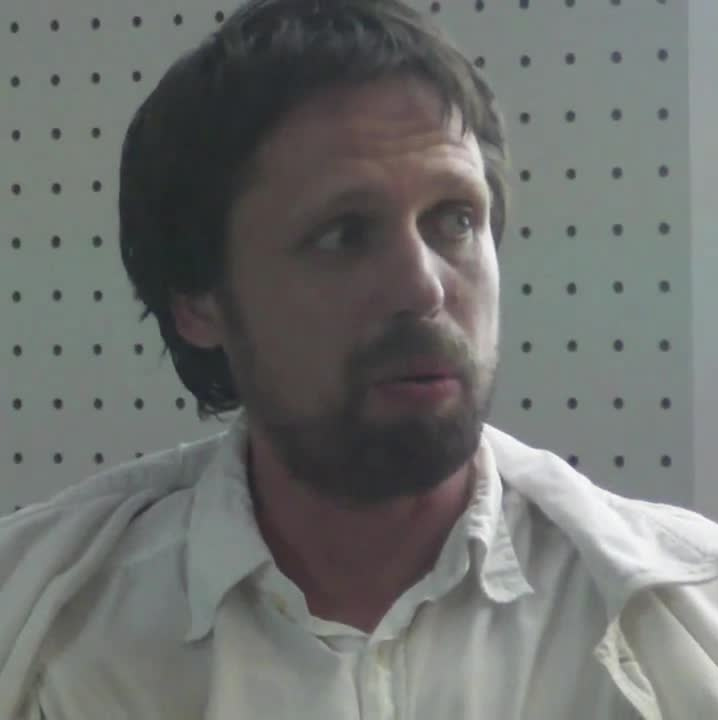
- Born: 10 July 1973 (age 53); Kranj, Socialist Federal Republic of Yugoslavia (now in Slovenia)
- Occupations: Art historian and poet
- Writing career
- Notable works: Rosa, Nenaslovljiva imena, Hipidrom
- Notable awards: Veronika Award; 2002 for Rosa; Prešeren Foundation Award; 2010 for Nenaslovljiva imena Jenko Award; 2006 for Hipodrom; Rožanc Award; 2011 for Nujnost poezije

Miklavž Komelj (born 10 July 1973) is a Slovene poet and art historian.

Komelj was born in Kranj in 1973. He studied History of Art at the University of Ljubljana and started publishing poetry in 1991.

In 2006 he won the Jenko Award for his poetry collection Hipodrom and in 2010 the Prešeren Foundation Award for his poetry collection Nenaslovljiva imena. In 2011 he received the Rožanc Award for Nujnost poezije.

== Poetry collections ==
- Luč delfina (1991)
- Jantar časa (1995)
- Rosa (2002)
- Hipodrom (2006)
- Nenaslovljiva imena (2008)

Modra obleka (2011) Roke v dežju (2011) Noč je abstraktnejša kot N (2014)

- Minima impossibilia (2016)

Liebestod (2017) 11 (2018) Stigmatizacija (2019) Goreča knjiga (2020)

== Books of prose ==
Sovjetska knjiga (2012) Larvae (2019) Skrij me, sneg (2021)

== Book of essays ==
Nujnost poezije (2010)
