= Andrej Medved =

Slovene poet, editor and translator (1947–2026)

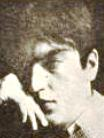
- Born: 3 February 1947; Ljubljana, PR Slovenia, FPR Yugoslavia (now Slovenia)
- Died: 23 February 2026 (aged 79)
- Occupations: Poet, editor and translator
- Writing career
- Notable works: Hiperion, Razlagalec sanj, Približevanja
- Notable awards: Prešeren Foundation Award; 2003 for Hiperion; Jenko Award; 2008 for Približevanja; Veronika Award; 2010 for Razlagalec sanj

Andrej Medved (3 February 1947 – 23 February 2026) was a Slovene poet, editor and translator. He published numerous poetry collections.

== Life and career ==
Medved was born in Ljubljana on 3 February 1947. He studied philosophy and the history of art at the University of Ljubljana and worked as an editor at various publications including Le Livre Slovène, the predecessor of the current Litterae slovenicae, published by the Slovene Writers' Association. He worked as a curator at the Coastal Galleries in Piran and was editor of the Artes and Hyperion series until his death.

He won the Prešeren Foundation Award in 2003 for his poetry collection Hiperion, the Jenko Award in 2008 for his poetry collection Približevanja (Convergences) and the Veronika Award in 2010 for Razlagalec sanj (Interpreter of Dreams).

Medved died on 23 February 2026, at the age of 79.

== Poetry collections ==
- Vrtovi Prispodob, žalobni lokvanji užitkov (Gardens of Metaphors, Gloomy Water Lilies of Pleasures), 2011
- Približevanja (Convergences), 2008
- Svetloba, v labirintu, 2007
- Vmesnost, 2007
- Ekloge, 2007
- Medprostor: allegro ma non troppo, 2007
- Priprtja & odstiranja, 2006
- Rimske elegije, 2004
- Nevarna razmerja, 2004
- Kitara, 2004
- Terpsihora, 2003
- Labirinti, 2003
- Hiperion, 2002
- Pesmi, 2001
- Uroki in prerokbe, 2001
- Kilini, 1996
- Videnja, 1994
- Telo losa, 1992
- Glava, 1987
- Ogenj, ogenj pada, 1974
- Sled, 1971
- Po poti vrnitve, po poti bega, 1969
- Toujours de nouveau (Vedno znova), 1966
