= Peter Semolič =

Slovene poet and translator (born 1967)

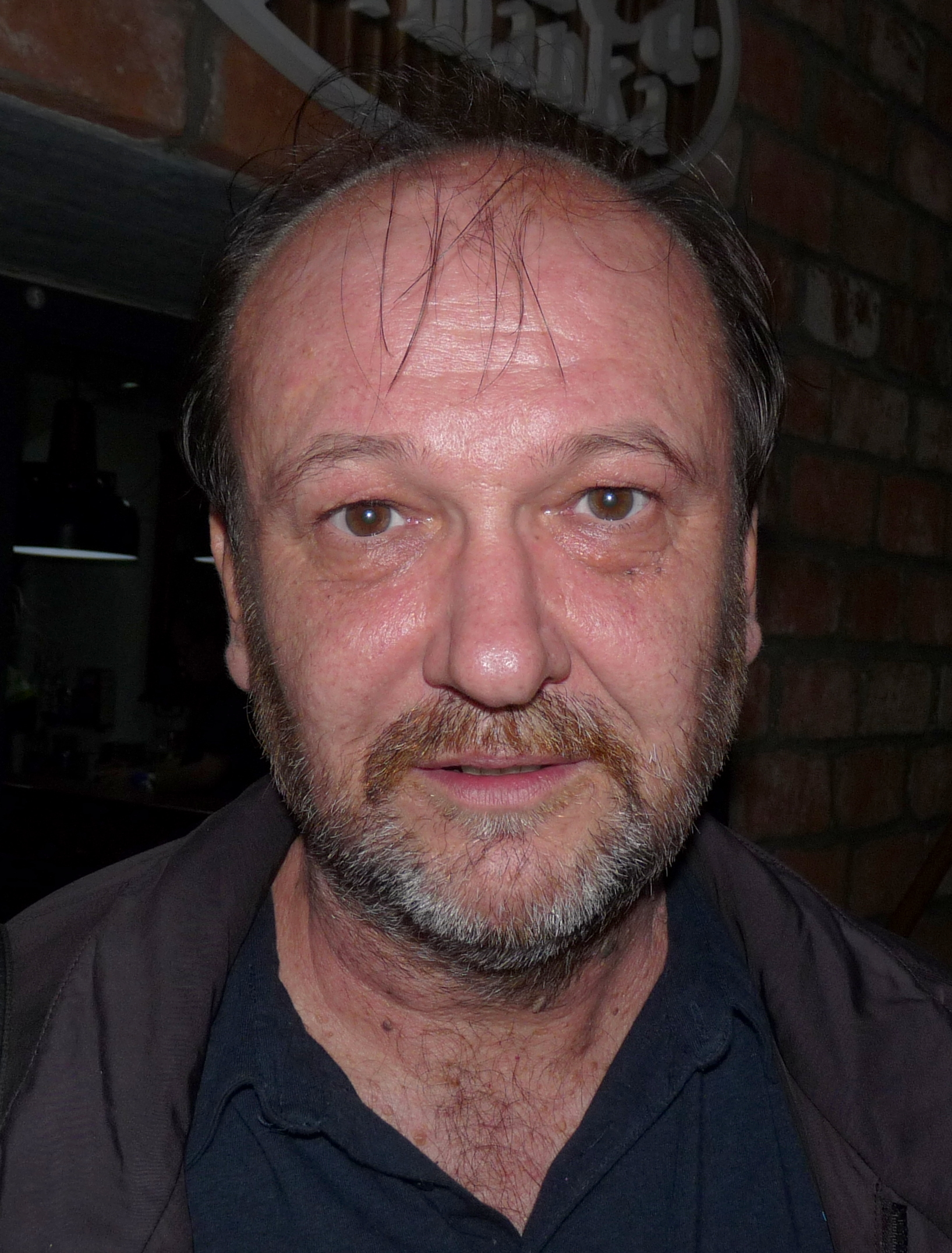
- Semolič in 2016
- Born: 1 February 1967 (age 59); Ljubljana, SR Slovenia, SFR Yugoslavia
- Occupations: Poet, translator
- Writing career
- Notable awards: Jenko Award; 1997 for Hiša iz besed Prešeren Foundation Award; 2000 for Krogi na vodi

Peter Semolič (born 1 February 1967) is a Slovene poet and translator. He has published numerous collections of poetry and his poems have been translated into English, German, Italian, French, Spanish, Polish, Hungarian, Finnish, Serbian, Bulgarian and Macedonian. He translates from English, French, Serbian and Croatian and also writes radio plays and children's literature.

Semolič was born in Ljubljana in 1967 and studied Linguistics and Sociology of culture at the University of Ljubljana. In 1997 he won the Jenko Award for his poetry collection Hiša iz besed (House Made of Words) and in 2001 the Prešeren Foundation Award for his poetry collection Krogi na vodi (Circles Upon the Water).

== Poetry collections ==
- Rimska Cesta (The Milky Way), 2009
- Vožnja okrog sonca (A Drive Round the Sun), 2008
- Prostor zate (A Space for You ), 2006
- Barjanski ognji (Bog Fires), 2004
- Meja (Border), 2002
- Vprašanja o poti (Questions About the Path), 2001
- Krogi v vodi (Circles Upon the Water), 2000
- Hiša iz besed (House Made of Words), 1996
- Bizantinske rože (The Roses of Byzantium), 1994
- Tamariša (Tamarisk), 1991
