= Ervin Fritz =

Slovene poet, playwright and translator (born 1940)

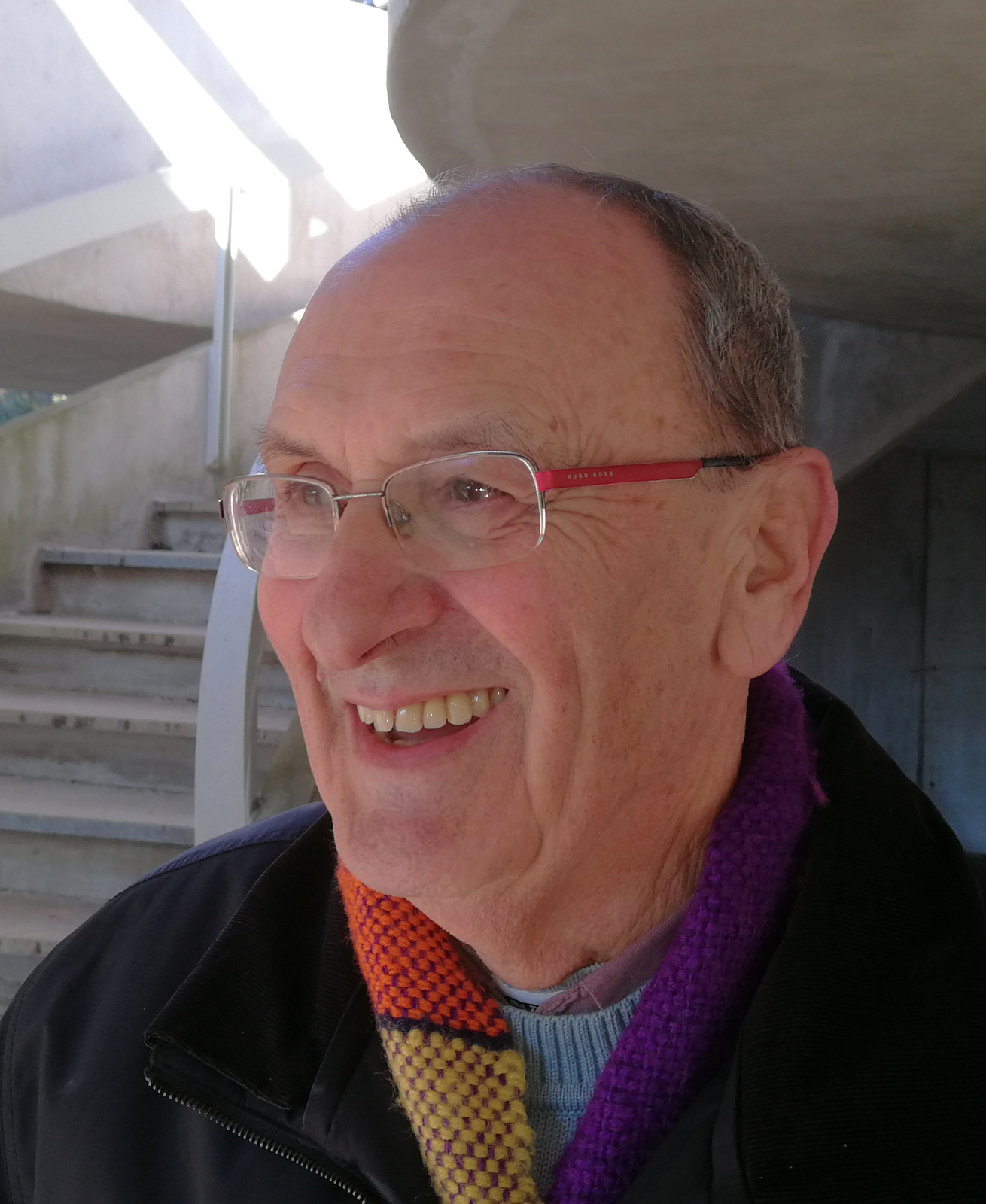
- Ervin Fritz
- Born: 27 June 1940; Prebold, Kingdom of Yugoslavia (now in Slovenia)
- Occupations: Poet, playwright and translator
- Writing career
- Notable works: Okruški sveta, Ogrlica iz rad
- Notable awards: Prešeren Foundation Award; 1979 for Okruški sveta Veronika Award; 2011 for Ogrlica iz rad

Ervin Fritz (born 27 June 1940) is a Slovene poet, playwright and translator. He also writes poetry for children, radio plays, songs and librettos. He started publishing poetry in the mid-1960s.

Fritz was born in Prebold in 1940. He studied Dramaturgy at the Academy for Theatre, Radio, Film and Television in Ljubljana and worked as dramatourge at TV Ljubljana and Radio Slovenia.

In 1979 he won the Prešeren Foundation Award for his poetry collection Okruški sveta and in 2006 he received the Veronika Award for the poetry collection Ogrlica iz rad.

== Selected works ==
=== Poetry collections ===
- Hvalnica življenja, 1967
- Dan današnji, 1972
- Okruški sveta, 1978
- Pesmi, 1980
- Minevanje, 1982
- Dejansko stanje: Pesmi in songi, 1985
- Slehernik, 1987
- Črna skrinjica, 1991
- Pravzaprav pesmi, 1995
- Favn:Pesmičice kosmatičice, 1998
- Tja čez:Soneti, 2002
- Pesmi: Zgodnja, zrela in pozna trgatev: jagodni izbor, 2002
- Ogrlica iz rad, 2005
- Drugačen svet, 2008
- Dolgi pohod, 2010

=== Poetry collections for children ===
- Dimnikar je črn grof, 1984
- Svet v naprstniku, 1992
- Mavrica Mavra, 1993
- Števila, 1993
- Nasprotja, 1993
- Moj dan, 1993
- Barve, 1994
- Liki, 1994
- Vrane, 2007

=== Prose for children ===
- Devet zgodb in deseta desetnica, 1996
- Sreča in nesreča, 2010

=== Plays ===
- Farse, 1973
- Mirakel o sveti Neži, 1977
- Kralj Malhus, 1988
- Lipicanija, 2000
- Rdeči kotiček, 2009
- Srčevje svetega Andreja, 2009
- Krpanova kobila, opera libretto 2010

=== Radio plays ===
- Komisija za samomore, 1984
- Stoli, 1984
- Kralj Malhus, 1986
- Karantena, 1988
- Ta veseli dan ali Cefizelj se ženi, 1990
- Zmaj v Postojnski jami, 1990
- Mirakel o sveti Neži, 1991
- Krompir ali Kregarca in ljudska oblast, 1993

=== Radio plays for children ===
- Zajček Peter, 1985
- Sin polka, 1986
- Grofič prašič, 1991
- Gorski škrat, 1991
- Črna baba in povodni mož, 1991
- Modra Barbica, 1992
- Legenda o Jezusu in svetem Petru, 1992
- Papagaj kralja Matjaža, 1994
