= Uroš Zupan =

Slovene poet and translator (born 1963)

- Born: 25 August 1963 (age 63); Trbovlje, Socialist Federal Republic of Yugoslavia (now in Slovenia)
- Occupations: Poet and translator
- Writing career
- Notable works: Odpiranje delte, Drevo in vrabec
- Notable awards: Prešeren Foundation Award; 1996 for Odpiranje delte Jenko Award; 2000 for Drevo in vrabec

Uroš Zupan (born 25 August 1963) is a Slovene poet and translator. He has published numerous collections of poetry and his poetry has also been translated into German, Polish, Czech, Slovak, English, Serbian and Croatian.

Zupan was born in Trbovlje in 1963 and lived there until he went to study Comparative literature and Sociology of culture at the University of Ljubljana. He works as a translator from English, Croatian and Serbian into Slovene. He has translated works by Yehuda Amichai and John Ashbery into Slovene. In 1996 he won the Prešeren Foundation Award for his poetry collection Odpiranje delte (Opening the Delta) and in 2000 the Jenko Award for his poetry collection Drevo in vrabec (The Tree and the Sparrow).

== Poetry collections ==
- Copati za hojo po Kitajski (Slippers for Walking Around China), 2008
- Jesensko listje (Autumn Leaves), 2006
- Lokomotive (Locomotives), 2004
- Sutre (Sūtras), 1991, 2002, 2003
- Nafta (Oil), 2002
- Drevo in vrabec (The Tree and the Sparrow), 1999
- Nasledstvo (Succession), 1998
- Odpiranje delte (Opening the Delta), 1995
- Reka (River), 1993
