= Jure Detela =

- Born: 12 February 1951; Ljubljana, Socialist Federal Republic of Yugoslavia (now in Slovenia)
- Died: 17 January 1992 (aged 40); Ljubljana, Slovenia
- Occupations: Poet, writer and essayist
- Writing career
- Notable works: Pesmi, Haiku = Haiku
- Notable awards: Jenko Award; 1992 for Pesmi

Jure Detela (12 February 1951 – 17 January 1992) was a Slovene poet, writer, and essayist.

Detela was born in Ljubljana and studied art history at the University of Ljubljana. In his college years he collaborated with the poet Iztok Osojnik and sociologist Iztok Saksida in publishing their Podrealistični manifest (The Sub-Realist Manifesto) in 1979, and he later participated in the avantgarde group Pisarna Aleph (Aleph Office). Apart from poetry, he also published the autobiographical novel Pod strašnimi očmi pontonskih mostov (Under the Scary Eyes of Pontoon Bridges) in 1988. He died in Ljubljana in 1992.

== Honors ==
In 1992 Detela was posthumously awarded the Jenko Award in 1995 for poetry. The 32nd Biennial of Graphic Arts (2017) in Ljubljana takes its title Birth as Criterion from one of Detela's poems as translated by Raymond Miller.

== Poetry collections ==
- Zemljevidi (Maps), 1978
- Mah in srebro (Moss and Silver), 1983
- Pesmi (Poems), 1992
- Haiku = Haiku, with Iztok Osojnik, 2004

== Prose ==
- Pod strašnimi očmi pontonskih mostov, (Under the Scary Eyes of Pontoon Bridges), novel, 1988
- Zapisi o umetnosti (Notes on Art), collection of essays, 2005
