= Brane Mozetič =

Slovene poet, writer, editor and translator

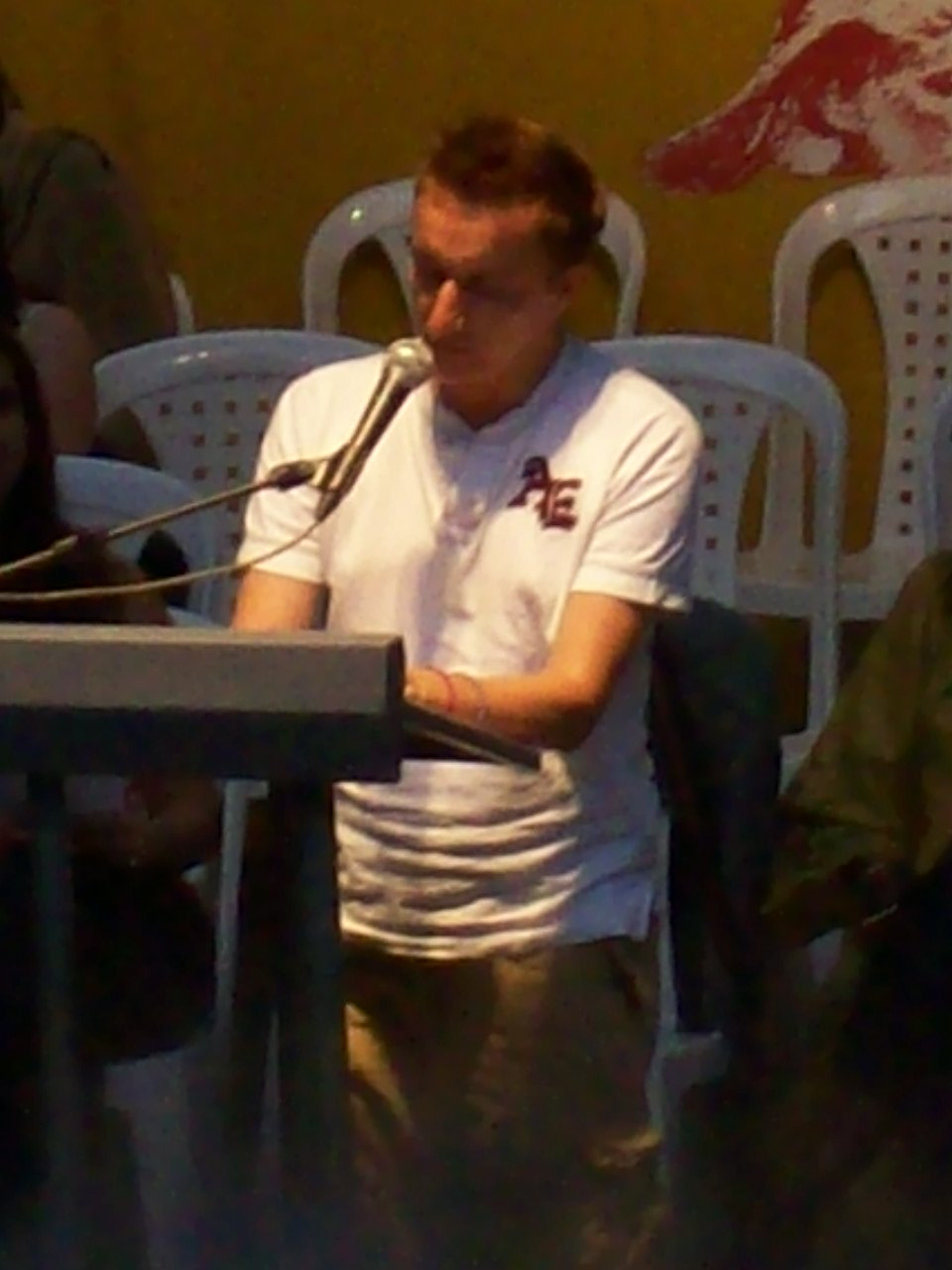
- Born: 14 October 1958; Ljubljana, Socialist Federal Republic of Yugoslavia (now in Slovenia)
- Occupations: Poet, writer, translator and editor
- Writing career
- Notable work: Banalije
- Notable awards: Jenko Award; 2003 for Banalije

Brane Mozetič (born 14 October 1958) is a Slovene poet, writer, editor and translator. He is known for his homoerotic poetry, his editorial work and his translations of works by Arthur Rimbaud, Jean Genet and Michel Foucault into Slovene.

== Biography ==
Mozetič was born in Ljubljana in 1958. He studied Comparative literature and Literary theory at the University of Ljubljana and graduated in 1983. He works as the editor of the literary collections Aleph and Lambda at the Centre for Slovenian Literature. In 2003 he won the Jenko Award for his poetry collection Banalije (Banalities). He has edited four anthologies of LGBT literature and several presentations of contemporary Slovenian literature. He has more than forty books in translation, his poetry collection Banalije (Banalities, 2003) alone being translated into twelve languages, making him one of the most translated contemporary Slovenian authors. He also organises translation workshops, readings of Slovenian authors abroad, a small literary and music festival Living Literature, the Ljubljana LGBT Film Festival, etc.

== Published works ==
=== Poetry collections ===
- Sneguljčica je sedem palčkov, 1976
- Soledadesi, 1978
- Pesmi in plesi, 1982
- Modrina dotika, 1986
- Zaklinjanja, 1987
- Mreža, 1989
- Obsedenost/Obsession, slov. – franc. izdaja, 1991
- Pesmi za umrlimi sanjami, 1995
- Metulji, 2000
- Banalije, 2003
- Še banalije, 2005
- In še, 2007
- Mesta ure leta, 2011
- Nedokončane skice neke revolucije, 2013
- Sanje v drugem jeziku, Škuc 2018

=== Prose ===
- Pasijon, 1993
- Angeli, 1996
- Zgubljena zgodba, 2001
- Objemi norosti, 2015

=== Books for children ===
- Dežela bomb, dežela trav, 2013
- Alja dobi zajčka, 2014
- Prva ljubezen, 2014
- Dihurlandija, 2016
- Murenček in Polhek, 2017

=== Books in translation ===
- Obsedenost / Obsession, Aleph – Ed. Genevieve Pastre, Ljubljana – Paris 1991
- Anđeli, Meandar, Zagreb 2000
- Parole che bruciano / Besede, ki žgejo, Mobydick, Faenza 2002
- Obsession, Ecrits des Forges, Quebec 2002
- Butterflies, Meeting Eyes Bindery, New York 2004
- Schattenengel, Passagen Verlag, Wien 2004
- He somiat que havies mort (&Svetlana Makarovič), Emboscal + ILC, Barcelona 2004
- Poemas por los suenos muertos, CEDMA, Malaga 2004
- Banalii, Blesok, Skopje 2004
- Leptiri, DAN, Zagreb 2005
- Passion, Talisman House, Jersey City 2005
- To nie jest księga seksu, Wydawnictwo Zielona Sowa, Kraków 2005
- Metulji / mariposas, Ediciones Gog y Magog, Buenos Aires 2006
- Banalni neshta, Izdatelstvo Karina M., Sofija 2006
- Die verlorene Geschichte, Sisyphus, Klagenfurt 2006
- Borboletas, Editorial 100, Vila Nova de Gaia 2007
- Passion, ZOE edizioni, Forli 2007
- Schmetterlinge, Sisyphus Verlag, Klagenfurt 2008
- Banalities, A Midsummer Night's Press, New York 2008
- Andělé, Větrné mlýny, Brno 2009
- Farfalle, Edizioni ETS/Alleo, Pisa 2009
- Banalitats, Eumo Editorial, Vic 2009
- Banalien, Männerschwarm Verlag, Hamburg 2010
- Storia perduta, Beit Casa Editrice, Trieste 2010
- Banality, Adolescent, Zabreh 2011
- Banalità, Edizioni del Leone, Venezia 2011
- Banalidades, Ediciones Gog y Magog, Buenos Aires 2011
- Lost Story, Talisman House, Jersey City 2011
- Banalije, Altagama, Zagreb 2012
- Banalnošči, Raduga, Kyiv 2012
- Gharaq Xortohra (&Suzana Tratnik), Inizjamed, Valletta 2013
- Banalidades, Visor libros, Madrid 2013
- El pais de las bombas, Bellaterra, Barcelona 2014
- El pais dels bombes, Bellaterra, Barcelona 2014
- Bilad alkanabil wa bilad alhašaiš, Sefsafa, Kairo 2014
- Pasión, Dos Bigotes, Madrid 2014
- Nedovršene skice jedne revolucije, h, d, p, Zagreb 2015
- Banalités, Maison de la poésie, Tinqueux 2015
- Banalien 2, Sisyphus Verlag, Klagenfurt 2016
- Mi primer amor, Bellaterra, Barcelona 2016
- Possesão, Roma Editora, Lisboa 2016
- Il coniglio di Alja, Asterios Editore, Trieste, 2016
- Com’è verde il mondo senza le bombe della guerra, Asterios Editore, Trieste, 2016
- Mugiuittang aideul, Hanulimkids Publishing, Seoul 2016
- Mania, Raduga, Kyiv 2017
- Första kärleken, Vombat förlag, Färjestaden 2017
- Que teñas unha lectura solitaria, Chan da Pólvora Ed., Santiago de Compostela 2017
- Esbozos inacabados de una revolución, Baile del Sol, Tegueste 2017
- Unfinished Sketches of a Revolution, Talisman House, Northfield 2018
- Umarmungen des Wahnsinns, Sisyphus Verlag, Klagenfurt 2018
- Cheot Sarang, Oomzicc Publisher, Seoul 2018
