= Hotavlje =

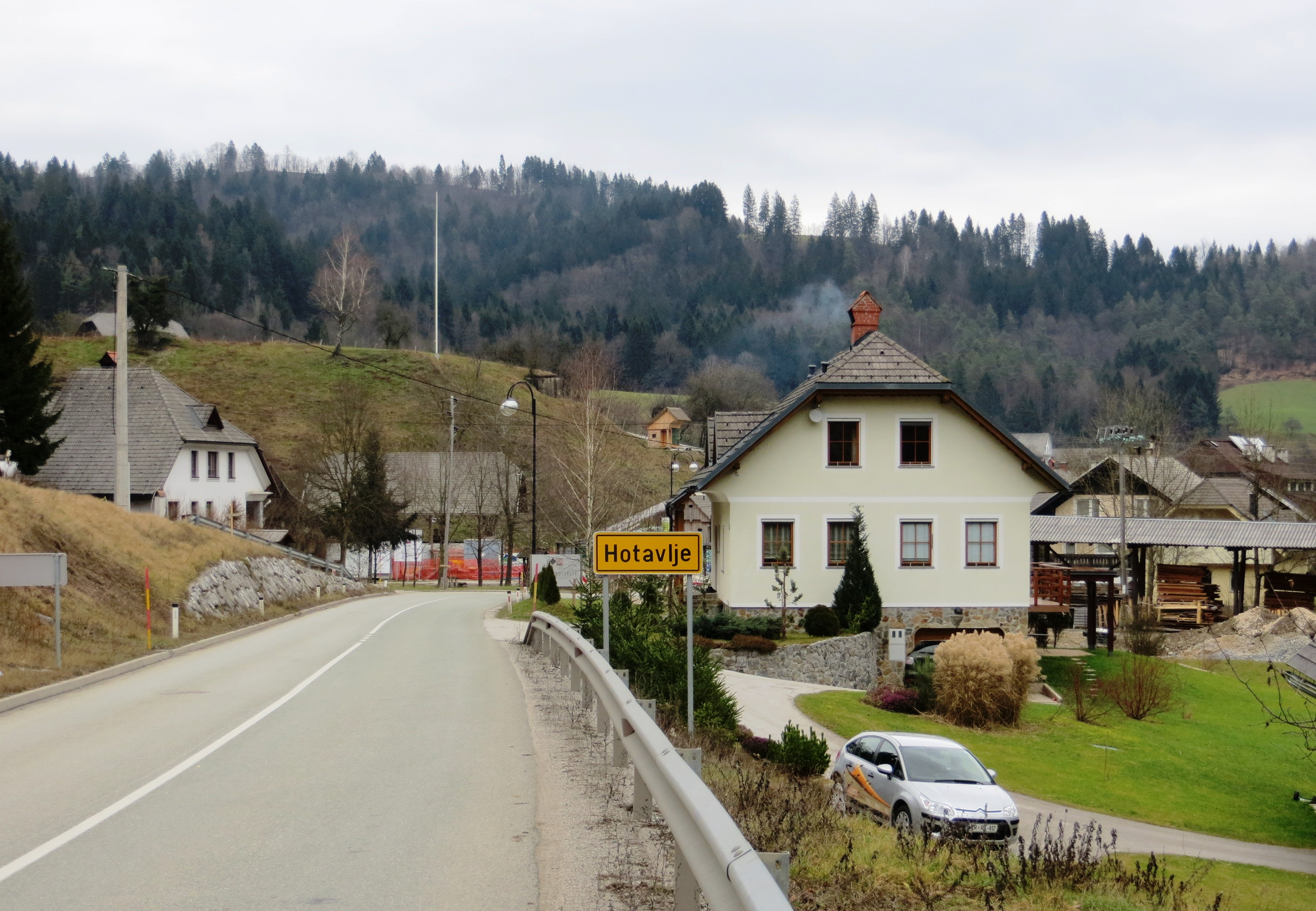
- Hotavlje

- Location in Slovenia
- Coordinates: 46°6′42.21″N 14°6′40.73″E
- Country: Slovenia
- Traditional region: Upper Carniola
- Statistical region: Upper Carniola
- Municipality: Gorenja Vas–Poljane

Area
  - Total: 4.14 km^{2} (1.60 sq mi)
- Elevation: 445.2 m (1,461 ft)

Population (2020)
  - Total: 437
  - Density: 106/km^{2} (273/sq mi)

Hotavlje (pronounced [xɔˈtaːu̯ljɛ]; in older sources also Hotovlje, German: Hotaule) is a village in the Poljane Sora Valley in the Municipality of Gorenja Vas–Poljane in the Upper Carniola region of Slovenia.

== Geography ==
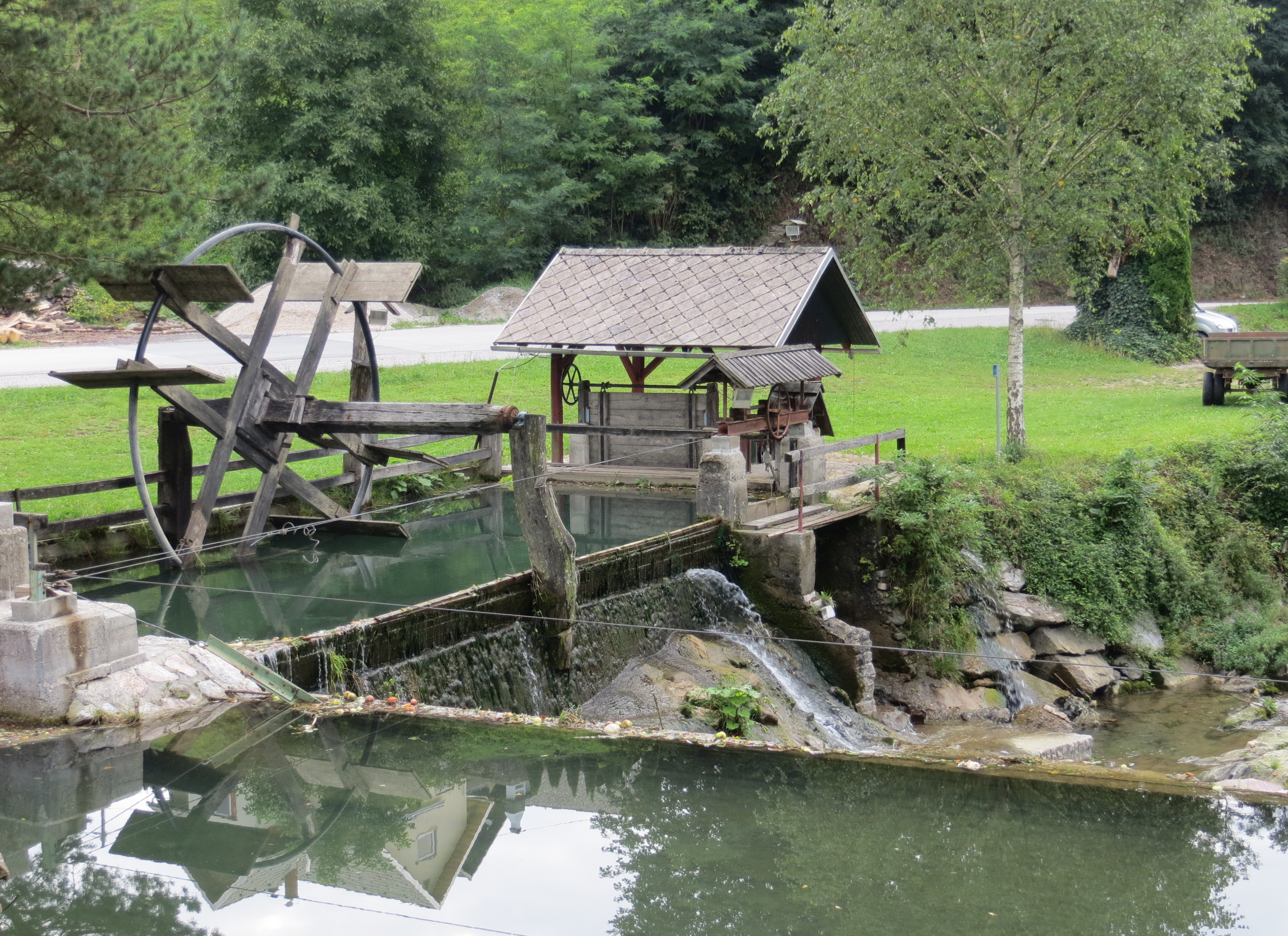
Mill wheel and sluice on Hotaveljščica Creek

Hotavlje lies in a narrow valley above the outflow of Hotaveljščica Creek (an alternate name applied after the confluence of Kopačnica Creek with Volaščica Creek) into the Poljane Sora. Homovšak Creek joins Hotaveljščica Creek further downstream, near Saint Lawrence's Church. Hotavlje primarily lies along the road north to Kopačnica. The valley itself is damp, and the surrounding slopes have a shale and limestone composition. Vranšek Hill (Slovene: Vranškov grič; 908 meters or 2,979 feet) rises above the village to the west.

=== Quarries ===
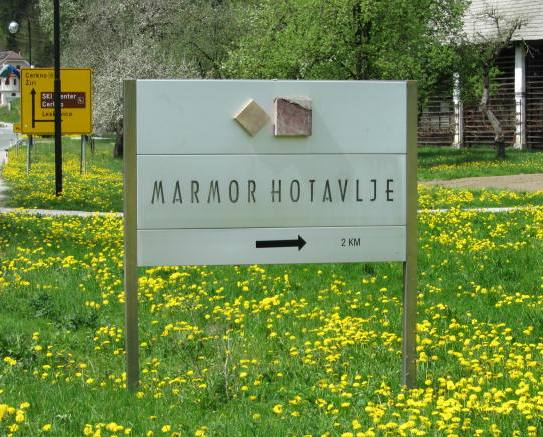
Sign for the Hotavlje Quarry

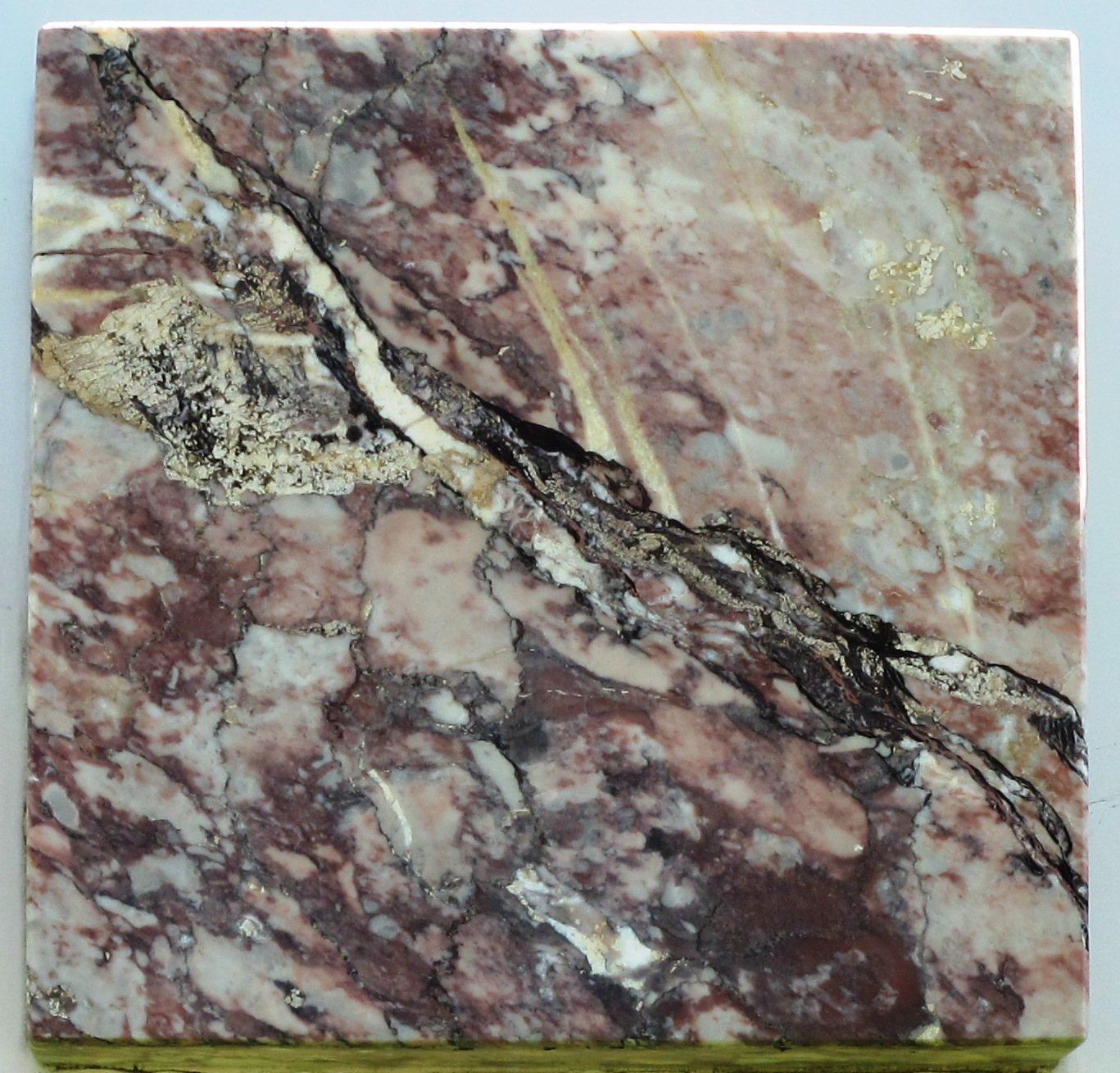
Cordevolian limestone ("Hotavlje marble")

Quarrying in Hotavlje

Hotavlje is best known for its stone quarries, which started operating in the mid-19th century. Cordevolian limestone (marketed as Cordevol limestone, also referred to as hotaveljski marmor 'Hotavlje marble') is a greyish-pink and red mineral. It has an attractive mottled appearance with irregular patches of grey, opaque yellow, or scarlet dolomite in small rhomboid crystals, white and coloured calcite veins, and frequent remnants of fossilised algae. Its colour and the high gloss of its polished surface make it a popular material and it was traditionally used in buildings in the area. It is quarried by the local company Marmor Hotavlje, which employs 150 workers and over the years has developed into one of Slovenia's leading stone-cutting companies, using the local quarries to the north of the settlement as well as travertine and tuff quarries in Jezersko and limestone breccia in Bosnia and Herzegovina. The marble is also used for restoration work in registered buildings. The replica of the Robba Fountain in the main town square in Ljubljana was made by the company and it has supplied cut and carved marble to projects abroad such as the Saint Sava's Church in Belgrade.

== Name ==
The name of the settlement was first attested in 1291 and 1318 as Chotaeuel (and later as Chotawlach circa 1420 and Kataull in 1500, among other spellings). In the past the German name was Hotaule. It is probably derived from the nickname *Xotava, in turn from a Slavic personal name such as *Xotimirъ, and probably refers to an early inhabitant of the place. In the past the German name was Hotaule.

== History ==
In the 17th century, ore was transported across the hills to Hotavlje and foundries operated along Volaščica Creek, which continued to supply material to Železniki in the 19th century. A water main was installed in Hotavlje in 1962, piped from Trebija.

== Church ==
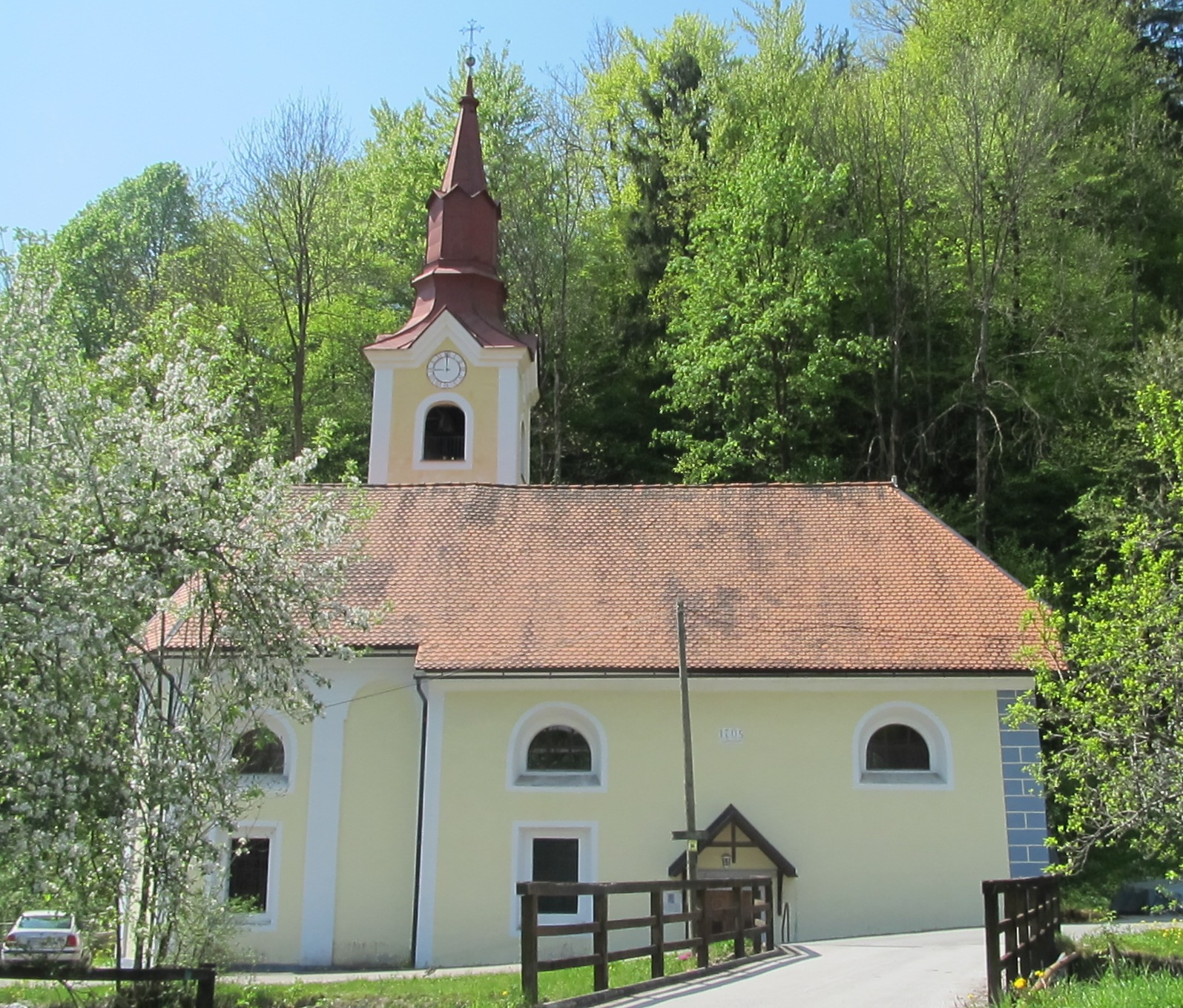
Saint Lawrence's Church in Hotavlje

The local church is dedicated to Saint Lawrence. It stands at the foot of White Hill (Slovene: Bela) opposite a bridge over Kopačnica Creek, southwest of the core of Hotavlje. The church was first mentioned in a land register dating to 1501 and then in visitation records of the Counts of Gorizia dating to 1520, but its angled apse indicates a gothic origin. The simple rectangular nave dates to around 1705. The belfry was built in 1630 and made taller in 1718. The main altar bears the years 1792 (probably when it was made) and 1901 (probably when it was renovated). It is dedicated to Saint Lawrence and Saint Cantianius. The side altars, dedicated to Saint Roch and Saint Clement, as well as the depictions of the Stations of the Cross, are from the late 18th century.

== Other cultural heritage ==
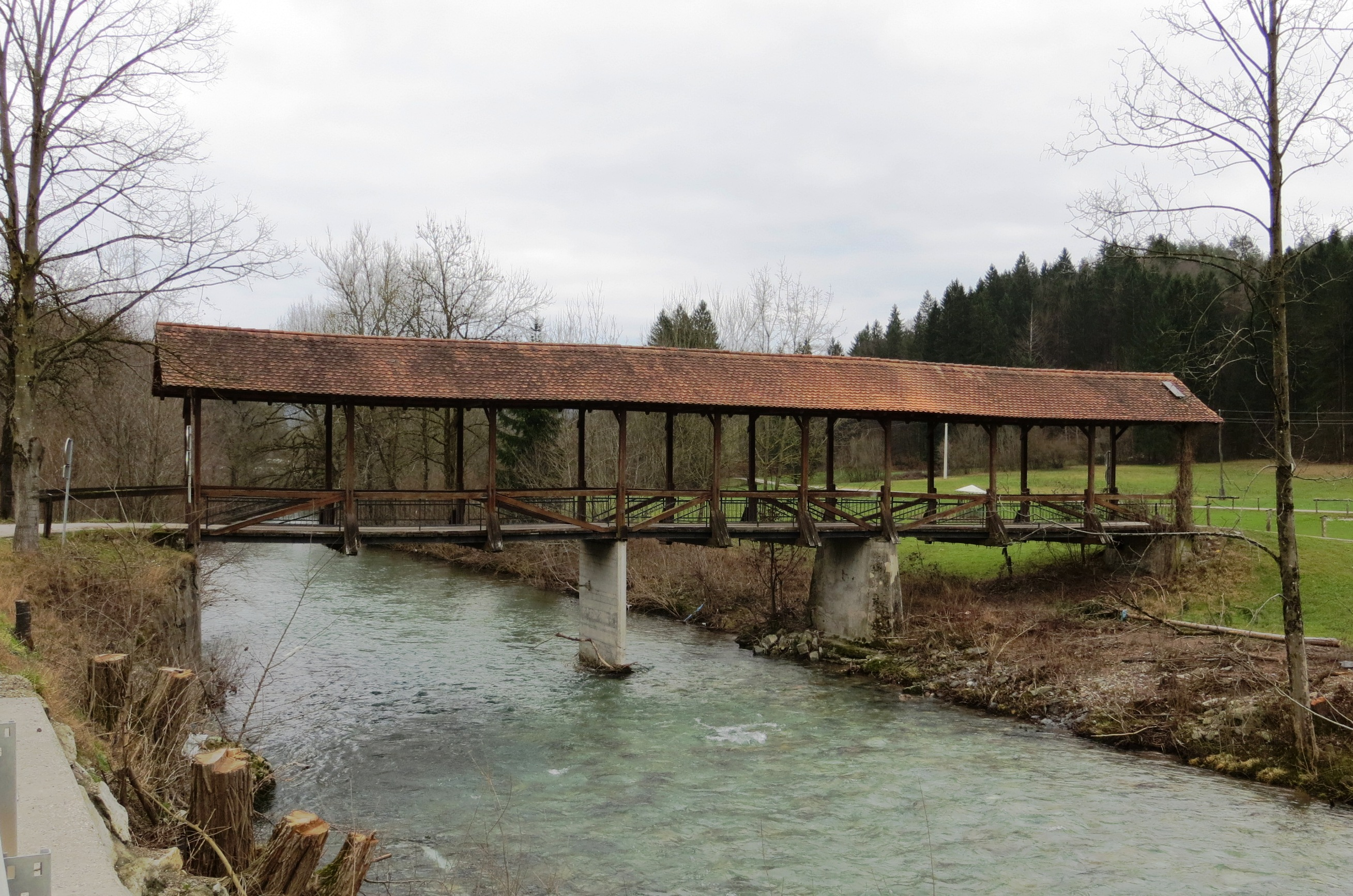
Wooden bridge across the Poljane Sora River

In addition to the church, a number of other sites in Hotavlje have cultural heritage status:

- The farm at Hotavlje no. 11 stands in the southeastern part of the settlement. It consists of a two-story stone house and barn under the same roof. The year 1820 is carved into the door casing, made of Cordevolian limestone. There is also a double hayrack with stone columns and two frames per side and a slate roof.
- The farm at Hotavlje no. 33 stands in the eastern part of the settlement. It consists of a two-story stone house with a steeply pitched roof that has the year 1822 carved into its door casing with a rounded top and a two-story partially stone barn with a mow attached to the house. There is also a wooden double hayrack with sides of two different heights.
- The housebarn at Hotavlje no. 30 stands in the eastern part of the settlement. It is a single-story structure; the vestibule and stable are built of stone and the living quarters of wood. The simple rounded entryway to the vestibule and the smoke kitchen are preserved and bear the year 1813.
- The house at Hotavlje no. 52 stands west of Saint Lawrence's Church. It is a stone two-story structure that combines living quarters and a barn. There is a door casing made of Cordevolian limestone on the east side, and a wooden door casing facing the courtyard. The building has a symmetrical half-hip roof and dates from the beginning of the 19th century.
- To the east of the settlement there is a wooden bridge dating to the mid-19th century across the Poljane Sora River.
- A memorial in the shape of a triangular column stands at the intersection of the roads to Škofja Loka, Kopačnica, and Žiri. It was designed by Marko Šlajmer (1927–1969) and unveiled in 1957, and it commemorates those fallen on the communist side during the Second World War. The triangular mausoleum next to it was created in 1964.

== Notable people ==
Notable people that were born or lived in Hotavlje include:

- Luka Pintar (1857–1915), linguist and literary historian
