= Pavla Jesih =

Slovene alpinist and businesswoman

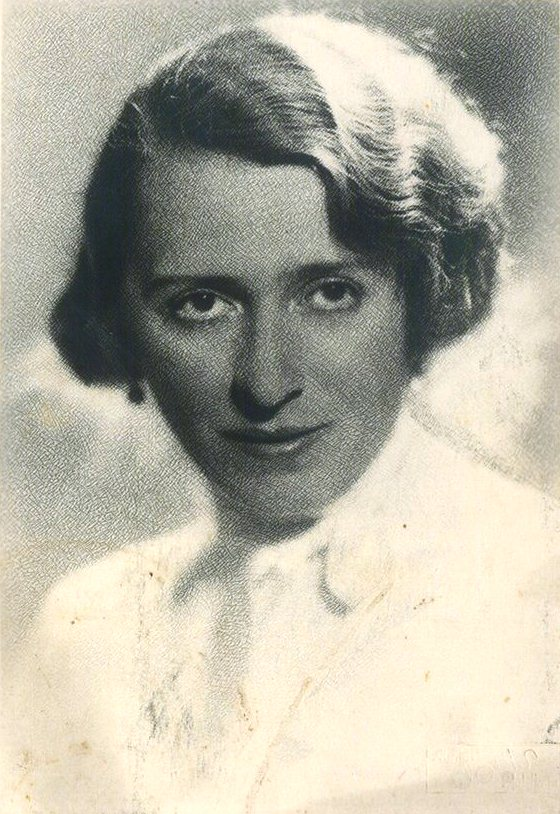

Personal information
- Nationality: Slovenian
- Born: May 10, 1901 Ljubljana, Slovenia
- Died: December 12, 1976 (aged 75)
- Occupation: Mountaineer

Climbing career
- Type of climber: rock and alpine climbing
- Updated on 24 September 2017

Pavla Jesih (May 10, 1901 – December 12, 1976) was a Slovenian mountaineer and female entrepreneur.

She was born in Ljubljana and learned to climb with Slovenia's Club Skala. In 1925 she and Dana Kuraltova completed the first Slovenian all-female ascent of the Slovenian Route on the north face of Triglav.

Between 1926 until 1933 she made 18 first ascents on technical routes on peaks such as Triglav (variant through the window, Skala direction, Jug Pillar), Škrlatica (Levi Pillar, Scale Pillar), Široka Peč, Špik (Šalek direction), Šite, Travnik, Frdamane Police, Jalovec, Rakova Špica, and some others. She most often climbed into the company of Miro Marko, Milan Gostiša, Jože Lipovec, Mihe Potočnik, Stanka Tominšek, and Joža Čop. She is perhaps best known for climbing the central Triglav Pillar, now named Čop's Pillar (Čopov steber). On the third day of her climb on Čop's Pillar, Jesih became too exhausted to continue, and so her partner Joča Čop finished the route on his own and then went for help. When rescue arrived on her fifth day on the route, Jesih climbed the route on her own without assistance and gained credit for the first ascent alongside Joža.

In 1933, Jesih fell 30 meters (98 ft) on the craggy peak of Mojstrovka. During her long recovery during the Second World War, she opened a successful chain of cinemas in the Drava Banovina and Yugoslavia, she owned the cinema hall Metropol and the Union cinema in Celje, then in Ptuj, and finally the Matica cinema in Ljubljana. Among other things, she was also an innovator in subtitling techniques.
