= Repče, Ljubljana =

Repče
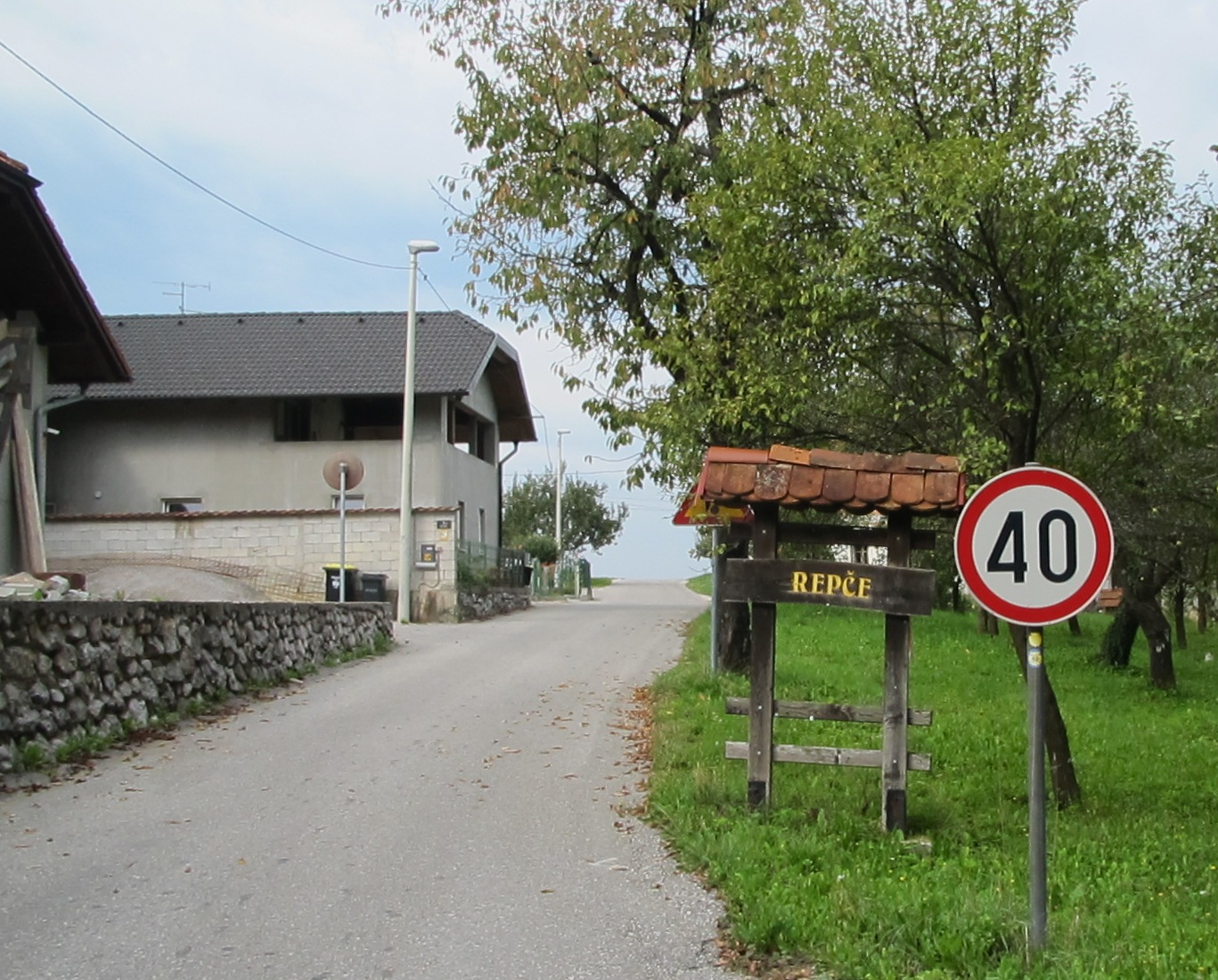
- Repče

- Location in Slovenia
- Coordinates: 45°59′28.95″N 14°37′25.8″E
- Country: Slovenia
- Traditional region: Lower Carniola
- Statistical region: Central Slovenia
- Municipality: Ljubljana

Area
  - Total: 1.47 km^{2} (0.57 sq mi)
- Elevation: 453.1 m (1,487 ft)

Population (2002)
  - Total: 67
- Postal code: 1293

Repče (pronounced [ˈɾeːptʃɛ]) is a small settlement in the hills above Šmarje-Sap in central Slovenia. It belongs to the City Municipality of Ljubljana. It is part of the traditional region of Lower Carniola and is now included with the rest of the municipality in the Central Slovenia Statistical Region.

== Name ==
Repče was attested in historical sources as Ressicz in 1444 and Reptsch in 1496.
