= Maja Vidmar =

- Born: 28 June 1961; Nova Gorica, Socialist Federal Republic of Yugoslavia (now in Slovenia)
- Occupation: poet
- Writing career
- Notable work: Prisotnost
- Notable awards: Jenko Award; 2005 for Prisotnost; Prešeren Foundation Award; 2006 for Prisotnost

Maja Vidmar (born 28 June 1961) is a Slovene poet, author of several poetry collections.

For her collection of poems Prisotnost (Presence) she won the Jenko Award in 2005 and the Prešeren Foundation Award in 2006.

== Poetry collections ==
- Razdalje telesa (Body Distances), 1984
- Način vezave (Ways of Binding), 1988
- Ihta smeri (Urgent Direction: Selected Poems), 1989
- Ob vznožju (At the Base), 1998
- Prisotnost (Presence), 2005
- Sobe (Rooms), 2008
