= Milan Jesih =

Slovene poet, playwright, and translator (born 1950)

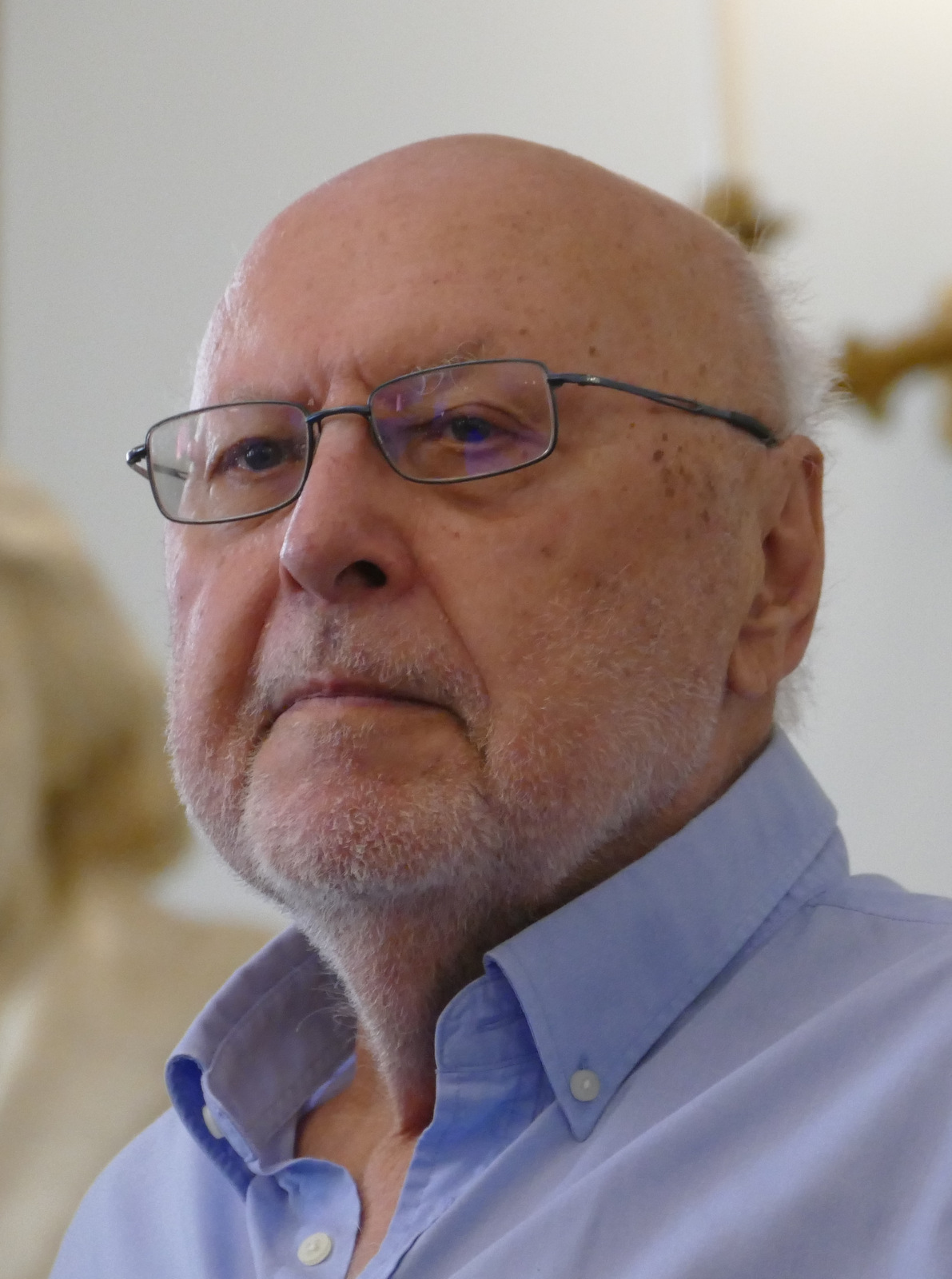
- Born: April 14, 1950 (age 76); Ljubljana, Socialist Federal Republic of Yugoslavia (now in Slovenia)
- Occupations: poet, playwright, translator
- Writing career
- Notable works: Soneti, Soneti drugi, Jambi, Grenki sadeži pravice
- Notable awards: Prešeren Award; 2002 for his poetic opus Jenko Award; 2001 for Jambi; Veronika Award; 2001 for Jambi

Milan Jesih (born April 14, 1950) is a Slovene poet, playwright, and translator. He was the president of the Slovene Writers' Association between 2009 and 2011.

Jesih was born in Ljubljana in 1950. He studied comparative literature at the University of Ljubljana and was a member of the avant-garde poetry group 442. He is known for his translations from English and Russian into Slovene (Shakespeare, Chekhov, and Bulgakov).

He won the Prešeren Foundation Award in 1986 for his poetry collection Usta and for his plays, the Jenko Award and the Veronika Award for his poetry collection Jambi in 2001, and the Grand Prešeren Award in 2002 for his poetic opus.

== Poetry collections ==
- Uran v urinu, gospodar! (1972)
- Legende (1974)
- Kobalt (1976)
- Volfram (1980)
- Usta (1985)
- Soneti (1989)
- Soneti drugi (1993)
- Jambi (2000)
