= Milan Dekleva =

Slovene poet, writer, playwright, composer and journalist

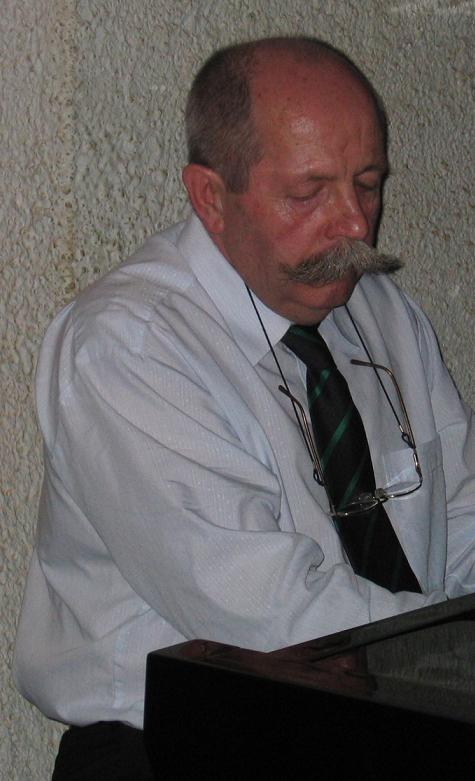
- Born: 17 October 1946 (age 79); Ljubljana, Socialist Federal Republic of Yugoslavia (now in Slovenia)
- Occupations: Poet, writer, playwright, composer, journalist
- Writing career
- Notable works: Mushi mushi, Zapriseženi prah, Zmagoslavje podgan
- Notable awards: Rožanc Award; 1999 for Gnezda in katedrale Veronika Award; 2003 for V živi zob Prešeren Award; 2006 for his lifetime literary work Kresnik Award; 2006 Zmagoslavje podgan Veronika Award; 2008 for Audrey Hepburn, slišiš metlo budističnega učenca?

Milan Dekleva (born 17 October 1946) is a Slovene poet, writer, playwright, composer and journalist.

Dekleva was born in Ljubljana in 1946. He graduated in comparative literature from the University of Ljubljana and works as a journalist. He is best known for his poetry and has published over twenty peorty collections, a number of novels and collections of short stories. He was the first poet to publish haiku in Slovene (Mushi mushi, 1971). Many of his poems deal with the modern human condition in the absence of God.

He received a number of awards including the Prešeren Foundation Award in 1989 for his poetry collection Zapriseženi prah, the Grand Prešeren Award in 2006 for his lifetime poetry and writing work and the Kresnik Award for his novel Zmagoslavje podgan (The Triumph of the Rats), also in 2006. He won the Veronika Award twice, in 2003 for his poetry collection V živi zob and again in 2008 for Audrey Hepburn, slišiš metlo budističnega učenca?.

== Poetry collections ==
- Mushi mushi, (1971)
- Dopisovanja, (1978)
- Nagovarjanja, (1979)
- Narečje telesa, (1984)
- Zaprišeženi prah, (1987)
- Odjedanje božjega, (1988)
- Panični človek, (1990)
- Preseženi človek: izreki, (1992)
- Kvantaški stihi, (1994)
- Šepavi soneti, (1995)
- Jezikava rapsodija; Improvizacija na neznano temo, (1996)
- Glej medenico cvetne čaše, kako se razpira, (2001)
- Sosledja, (2001)
- V živi zob, (2003)

== Plays ==
- Igra na vrhu, (1993)

== Prose ==
- Oko v zraku (Eye in the Sky), novel, (1997)
- Pimlico, novel, (1998)
- Reševalec ptic (Bird Saviour), short stories (1999)
- Zmagoslavje podgan (The Triumph of Rats), novel, (2005)
- Izkušnje z daljavo (Experience of Distance), short stories, (2006)
