= Nova revija (publishing company) =

Nova revija (Slovene for New Review or New Journal) is a Slovenian publishing house and cultural institute that developed from the literary journal with the same name.

The publishing house Nova revija was founded in 1990. In the 1990s and 2000s, several other magazines were launched within the Nova revija consortium, including a magazine for current political analysis Ampak (since 1999), the journal for legal theory Dignitas, the philosophical journal Phainomena (since 1992), and the journal for religious studies Poligrafi.

Since the early 1980s, Nova revija has edited and published works of those modern Slovene authors who were prevented from publishing their complete oeuvre during the Communist period. Those include Edvard Kocbek, Vitomil Zupan, Dušan Pirjevec, and Gregor Strniša.

== See also ==
- Sodobnost
