= Gvido =

Gvido is a Latvian masculine given name that may refer to the following notable people:

- Gvido Birolla (1881–1963), Slovene painter, illustrator and caricaturist
- Gvido Jekals (1904–1969), Latvian sprinter and decathlete
- Gvido Miezis (born 1980), Latvian cyclist
