= Lidija Osterc =

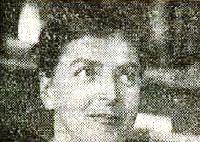
- Born: 1928
- Died: 2006 (aged 77–78)
- Education: Academy of Fine Arts, Ljubljana
- Known for: painting, illustrating
- Notable work: Painting and illustration
- Awards: Levstik Award; 1964 for Hišica iz kock Levstik Award; 1966 for Lonček, kuhaj! and Sneguljčica; Levstik Award; 1969 for Laponske pripovedi and Strašni lovec Bumbum and Očala tete Bajavaje

Lidija Osterc (1928 - 2006) was a Slovene painter and illustrator, best known for her illustrations of children's books.

She won the Levstik Award for her illustrations in children's books three times, in 1964, 1966, and 1969.

== Selected Illustrated Works ==
- Strašni lovec Bumbum (Bumbum the Terrifying Hunter), written by Tone Pavček, 1969
- Očala tete Bajavaje (Aunt Bajavaja's Specs), written by Ela Peroci, 1969
- Sneguljčica (Snow White), written by Brothers Grimm, 1966
- Hišica iz kock (House of Building Blocks), written by Ela Peroci, 1964
