= Marjan Amalietti =

- Born: 19 July 1923; Ormož, Slovenia
- Died: 1988 (aged 64–65); Ljubljana, Slovenia
- Education: Technical Faculty of the University of Ljubljana
- Known for: architecture, illustrating, caricature
- Notable work: Architecture, illustration and caricature
- Awards: Levstik Award; 1978 for Netočka Nezvanova and Ulenspiegel

Marjan Amalietti (19 July 1923 – 1988) was a Slovene architect, also known for his illustrations, comics and caricatures.

Amalietti was born in Ormož in 1923. He studied architecture at what was then the Technical Faculty of the University of Ljubljana (now the Faculty of Civil Engineering and Geodesy) and graduated in 1954. From 1957 he also taught at the faculty. For many years his caricatures were regularly published in the satirical magazine Pavliha. He also illustrated numerous children's books. In 1978 he won the Levstik Award for his illustrations of Netočka Nezvanova and Ulenspiegel (Netochka Nezvanova and Ulenspiegel).

== Selected Illustrated Works ==
- Socializem v Kozji vasi (Socializm in Goatsville), written by Vid Pečjak, 1988
- Majhen človek na veliki poti (A Small Man on a Big Road), written by Vida Brest, 1983
- Deček na črnem konju (The Boy on the Black Horse), written by Leopold Suhodolčan, 1979
- Kaplan Martin Čedermac (Chaplain Martin Čedermac), written by France Bevk, 1978
- Potepuh in nočna lučka (The Vagabond and the Night Light), written by Svetlana Makarovič, 1977
- Maruška Potepuška (Maruška's Adventures), picture book without text, 1977
- Ulenspiegel (Ulenspiegel), written by Jiří Kolář, 1977
- Netočka Nezvanova (Netochka Nezvanova ), written by Fyodor Dostoyevsky, 1977
