= Anja Štefan =

Anja Štefan may refer to:

- Anja Štefan (snowboarder)
- Anja Štefan (writer)
