= Cita Potokar =

Slovenian painter and illustrator (1915–1993)

- Born: November 28, 1915
- Died: November 28, 1993 (aged 78); Ljubljana, Slovenia
- Education: Academy of Fine Arts, Belgrade
- Known for: painting, illustrating
- Notable work: Painting and illustration
- Awards: Levstik Award; 1962 for Lizike za vse

Cita Potokar (28 November 1915 – 28 November 1993) was a Slovene painter also known for her illustrations of children's books. Many of her best known works draw from her experience as an internee during the Second World War as a result of her activities in the Slovene Liberation Front.

She won the Levstik Award for her illustrations of Branka Jurca's book Lizike za vse (Lollipops for All).

== Selected illustrated works ==
- Kaj nam je popisal Jakec (What Little Jack Told Us), written by Jože Šmit, 1953
- Vesela abeceda (Happy Alphabet), written by Vera Albreht, 1955
- Bratec in sestrica (Brother and sister), written by Branka Jurca, 1956
- Okoli in okoli (Round and Round), written by Branka Jurca, 1960
- Veliki in mali ljudje (Large and Small People), written by Zofka Kveder, 1960
- Lizike za vse (Lollipops for All), written by Branka Jurca, 1965
- Sto belokranjskih (A Hundred from White Carniola), written by Lojze Zupanc, 1965
- Marjanka Vseznalka (Marjanka Knowitall), written by Branka Jurca, 1966
