= Bitenc =

Bitenc is a surname of Slovenian origin. Notable people with this surname include:

- Ani Bitenc (1933–2024), Slovenian translator
- Demeter Bitenc (1922–2018), Slovenian film actor
- Janez Bitenc (1925–2005), Slovenian composer and music teacher

== See also ==
- Bitecta, genus of moths
