= Križanić =

Križanić, or Krizanic is a surname. Notable people with the surname include:

- Carla Krizanic (born 1990), Australian lawn bowler
- France Križanič (1928–2002), Slovene mathematician
- Juraj Križanić (c. 1618–1683), Croatian missionary
