= Škerlj =

Škerlj is a Slovene surname. Notable people with the surname include:

- Božo Škerlj (1908–1961), Slovene anthropologist
- Franc Škerlj (1941–2023), Yugoslav Slovene cyclist
