= Zvonko Čoh =

Slovene painter, illustrator, and animator

- Born: 7 August 1956 (age 69); Celje, Slovenia
- Education: Academy of Fine Arts, Ljubljana
- Known for: illustrating, Animation
- Notable work: Children's books illustrations, animated films
- Awards: Levstik Award; 1988 for Račka Puhačka and Rastoče težave Jadrana Krta; Levstik Award; 1999 for Enci benci na kamenci

Zvonko Čoh (born 7 August 1956) is a Slovene painter, illustrator, and animator, best known as the co-author (together with Milan Erič) of the first Slovene animated feature length film (i.e. the 1998 Socialization of a Bull). He has illustrated over thirty books for children and teenagers and made over twenty short animated films.

== Life and career ==
Čoh was born in Celje in 1956. He graduated from the Academy of Fine Arts in Ljubljana in 1980 and has since worked as a free-lance artist. As an illustrator he collaborates with many publishers in Slovenia and his illustrations also appear in magazines for children and young readers. He has made a number of short animated films and in 1998 he also created the first Slovene feature length animated film titled Socializacija bika? (Socialisation of a Bull) with the artist Milan Erič.

He won the Levstik Award twice, in 1988 for his illustrations in Račka Puhačka and Rastoče težave Jadrana Krta (The Fluffy Duckling and The Growing Pains of Adrian Mole) and in 1999 for his illustrations for the book children's folk limericks Enci benci na kamenci.

== Selected Illustrated Works ==
- Kekec in Pehta (Kekec and Pehta), written by Josip Vandot, 2011
- Deseti brat, Hamlet, Drakula in drugi (The Tenth Brother, Hamlet, Dracula and others), written by Marjan Kovačevič Beltram, 2011
- Žiga špaget gre v širni svet (Žiga the Spaghetti Goes Out Into The Wide World), written by Aksinja Kermauner, 2010
- Odisejada in druge zgodbe (The Osyssey and Other Stories), written by Marjan Kovačevič Beltram, 2006
- Najlepše pravljice 2 (Most Beautiful Fairy Tales 2), 2009
- Dogodek v mestnem logu (An Events in an Urban Forest), written by Helena Koncut Kraljič, 2009
- Listko in njegova življenja (Little Leaf and His Lives ), written by Helena Koncut Kraljič, 2009
- Kako sta se gospod in gospa pomirila (How Mr and Mrs Calmed Down), written by Miklavž Komelj, 2009
- Stonoga Tina (Tina the Centipede), written by Helena Koncut Kraljič, 2008
- Samovo potovanje v deželo svetlobe (Sam's Journey into the Land of Light), written by Helena Koncut Kraljič, 2008
- Štiri črne mravljice (Four Black Ants), written by Anja Štefan, 2007
- Obuti maček (Puss in Boots), written by Charles Perrault, 2003
