= Aleksander Konjajev =

- Born: 3 July 1909; Mikhaylov, Russia
- Died: 10 April 1995 (aged 85); Ljubljana, Slovenia
- Awards: Levstik Award; 1984 for Nevidni živi svet Levstik Award; 1991 for Nejc in drobnoživke
- Scientific career
- Fields: Agronomy, microbiology

Aleksander Konjajev (3 June 1909 – 10 April 1995) was a Russian-born Yugoslav agronomist and dean of the Biotechnology Faculty at the University of Ljubljana. He was an expert on microbiology of dairy farming.

He wrote numerous scientific books and articles as well as popular science books. He won the Levstik Award twice, in 1984 for his book Nevidni živi svet (The Invisible Living World) and in 1991 for Nejc in drobnoživke (Nejc and Tiny Bugs).
