= Marjan Manček =

Cartoonist, illustrator and animator

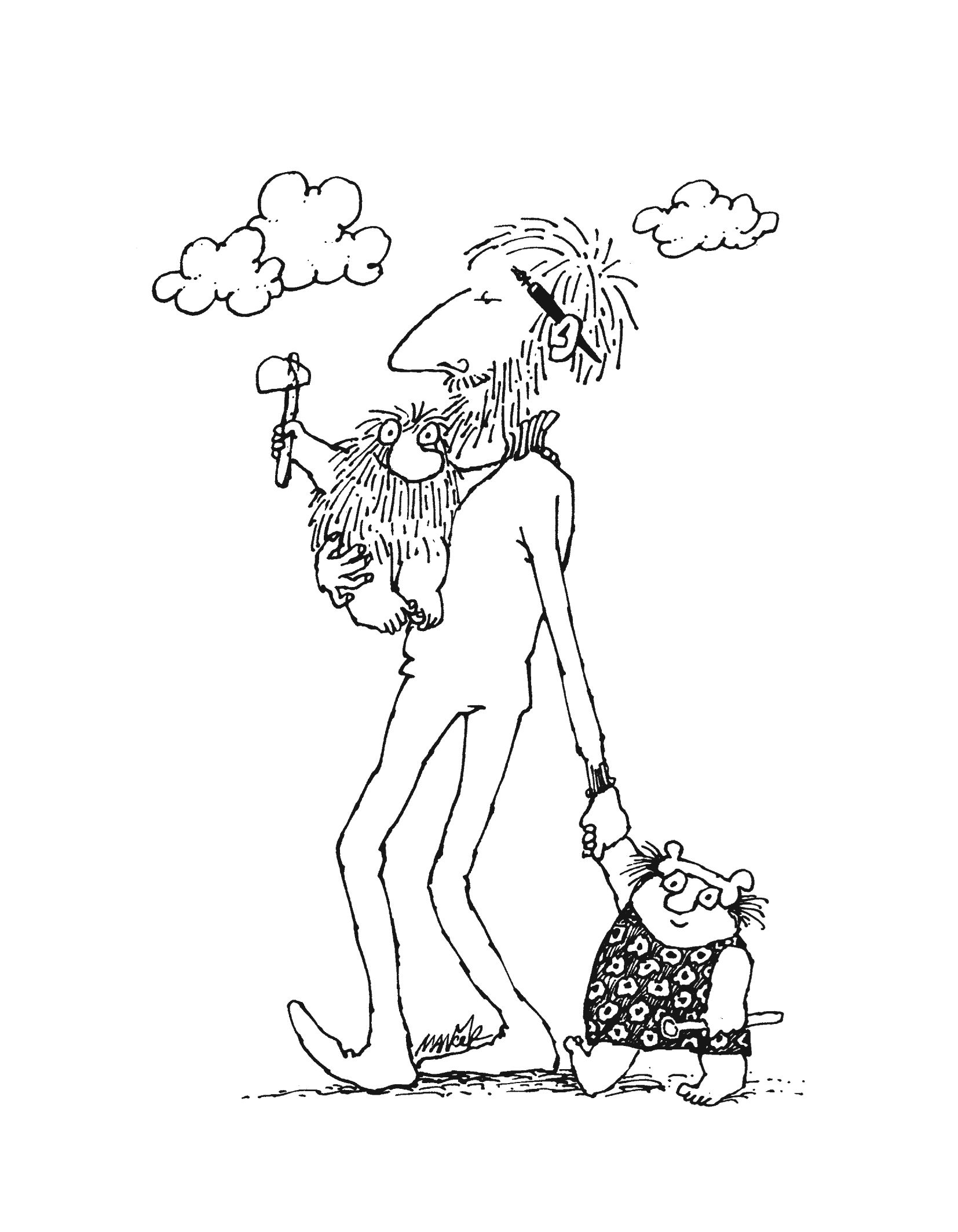
- Marjan Manček
- Born: January 3, 1948; Novo Mesto, Slovenia
- Known for: drawing, illustrating and animation
- Notable work: Children's books illustrations, caricatures
- Awards: Levstik Award; 2007 for lifetime achievement

Marjan Manček (born 3 January 1948) is a Slovene illustrator, cartoonist and animator. He has illustrated over 190 books and is himself also the author of 30 children's picture books and comics. He also produced a number of short animated films.

== Life ==
Manček was born in Novo Mesto in 1948. He studied English and History at the University of Ljubljana, but mostly worked as a free-lance caricaturist, illustrator and film animator. In 2007 he won the Levstik Awardfor lifetime achievement in illustration.
