= Katja Špur =

- Born: 20 November 1908; Gornje Krapje, Austria-Hungary (now Slovenia)
- Died: 18 December 1991 (aged 83); Ljubljana, Slovenia
- Occupations: Journalist; writer; poet; translator
- Writing career
- Notable awards: Levstik Award; 1949 for her journalistic work

Katja Špur (20 November 1908 – 18 December 1991) was a Yugoslav journalist, writer, poet and translator. She wrote poetry, children's books and contributed articles to numerous journals, newspapers and children's magazines. She won the Levstik Award for her journalistic work in 1949. She graduated from the Facility of Social Sciences at the University of Ljubljana subsequently working as a journalist and educator as well as translator from Bulgarian into Slovene.

== Bibliography ==
=== For children and young adults ===
- Zdaj pa šalo na stran (Now, That's Enough Kidding), article in children's magazine Kurirček, 1991
- Babice nimajo vedno prav (Grandma's Are Not Always Right), article in children's magazine Kurirček, 1989
- Pri materi (At Mother's), 1984
- Mojca reši račko (Mojca Saves the Duck), 1984
- Mojčine dogodivščine (My Adventures), 1984
- Muce na obisku (Cats for A Visit), 1984
- Potepuški poni (The Travelling Pony), 1984
- Zvesti čuvaj (The Dedicated Guard), 1984
- Sošolca (Schoolfriends), 1977
- Prva knjiga o rastlinah (First Book on Plants), 1951

=== Other ===
- Ljubezen je bolečina (Love is Pain), 1980
- Vezi (Bonds), 1970
- Slepa v pregnanstvu (Blind In Exile), 1963
- Dva studenca (Two Streams), 1958
- 50.000 hektarov (50,000 hectares), 1948
