= Robert Neubauer =

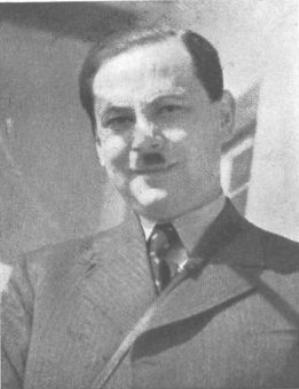
- Born: 7 December 1895; Vienna, Austria
- Died: 3 May 1969 (aged 73); Ljubljana, Slovenia
- Known for: research into tuberculosis
- Awards: Levstik Award; 1958 for Ceylon
- Scientific career
- Fields: medicine, phthisiology

Robert Neubauer (7 December 1895 – 3 May 1969) was a Slovene doctor, specialising in phthisiology.

Neubauer was born in Vienna in 1895 to a German father and a Slovene mother. He studied medicine at the University of Vienna and graduated in 1922. In 1923 he started running the Hospital for Pulmonary and Allergic Diseases in Golnik, making it one of the leading hospitals of its kind in the Kingdom of Yugoslavia. After the German invasion of Yugoslavia he was arrested and moved to Ljubljana. In 1942 he joined the Slovene Liberation Front and in 1944 joined the partisans. After the war he worked for the Yugoslav Red Cross and World Health Organization. He died in 1969 in Ljubljana.

Within his cooperation with the WHO Neubauer travelled extensively and after a visit to Sri Lanka wrote a book entitled Ceylon published in 1957 for which he won the Levstik Award in 1958.

Neubauer was a full member of the Slovenian Academy of Sciences and Arts from 1961.
