= Jelka Reichman =

Slovene painter and illustrator (born 1939)

- Born: August 29, 1939; Ljubljana, Slovenia
- Education: Academy of Fine Arts, Ljubljana
- Known for: Painting, drawing, illustrating
- Notable work: Children's books illustrations
- Awards: Levstik Award; 2005 for lifetime achievement

Jelka Reichman (born 29 August 1939) is a Slovene painter and illustrator, best known for her children's books illustrations.

== Life and career ==
Reichman was born in Ljubljana in 1939. She graduated from the Academy of Fine Arts in Ljubljana in 1963. She has illustrated over 200 children's books and is the designer of over 20 stamps issued by the Slovenian Post Office.

In 2005 she won the Levstik Award for lifetime achievement in illustration. She was named Slovene Woman of the Year for 2011.
