= Danijel Demšar =

- Born: 8 May 1954 (age 71); Maribor, Slovenia
- Education: Academy of Fine Arts, Ljubljana
- Known for: painting, illustrating
- Notable work: Children's books illustration
- Awards: Levstik Award; 1984 Kuža Luža and Mama žaba in žabčki and Kužmucke

Danijel Demšar (born 8 May 1954) is a Slovene painter and illustrator of children's books.

Demšar was born in Maribor. He graduated from the Academy of Fine Arts in Ljubljana in 1979 and has since worked as a free-lance artist. He has illustrated numerous children's books and won the Levstik Award in 1984 for his illustrations for the books Kuža Luža, Mama žaba in žabčki and Kužmucke (Puddles the Dog, Mother Frog and Froggies and Puppykittens).

== Selected Illustrated Works ==
- Angeli (Angels), written by Tone Pavček, 2012
- Palček, pomagaj! (Help me Dwarf!), written by Mira Voglar, 2008
- Otroška pesmarica 2 (Children's Songbook 2), 2006
- Krampata campata (Riddles and Poems), written by Mira Voglar, 2005
- Pogašeni zmaj (The Extinguished Dragon), written by Bina Štampe Žmavc, 2003
- Modri kačji pastir (The Blue Dragonfly), written by Polona Škrinjar, 2003
- Ernica gosenica (Erna the Caterpillar), written by Bina Štampe Žmavc, 2000
- Slovenski pesniki o jeseni (Slovenian Poets on Autumn), 1999
- Šamardalov zaklad (The Treasure of Al-Shamardal), 1997
- Slovenski pesniki o pomladi (Slovenian Poets on Spring), 1997
- Nebeške kočije (Heavenly Chariots), written by Bina Štampe Žmavc, 1994
- Kuža Luža (Puddles the Dog), written by Leopold Suhodolčan, 1984
- Kužmucke (Puppykittens), written by Marjeta Novak Kajzer, 1984
- Mama žaba in žabčki (Mother Frog and Froggies), written by Gvido Tartalja, 1983
