= Smiljan Rozman =

Slovene writer (1927–2007)

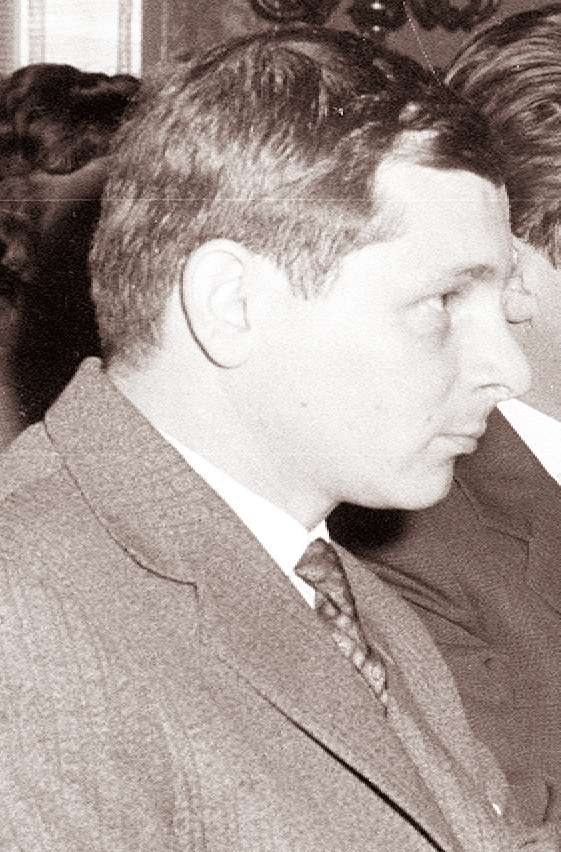
- Born: 28 January 1927; Celje, Kingdom of Serbs, Croats and Slovenes (now in Slovenia)
- Died: 15 March 2007 (aged 80); Ljubljana, Slovenia
- Occupations: Writer and screenwriter
- Writing career
- Notable works: Nekdo, Mesto, Druščina, Reporter Tejč poroča
- Notable awards: Prešeren Foundation Award; 1965 for Druščina; Levstik Award; 1968 for Reporter Tejč poroča

Smiljan Rozman (28 January 1927 – 15 March 2007) was a Slovene writer, author of numerous novels and collections of short stories who also wrote for young readers and scripts for children's programmes and drama series on television.

Rozman was born in Celje in 1927. Soon after his birth the family moved to Maribor where he grew up. During the Second World War sent on forced labour to Germany and France. After the war he worked as a factory worker, musician, painter, actor and teacher and eventually a full-time writer. He died in Ljubljana in 2007.

In 1965 he won the Prešeren Foundation Award for his novel Druščina (The Company). In 1968 he won the Levstik Award for his book Reporter Tejč poroča (Tejč the Reporter Reports).

== Published works ==
Adult Prose

- Nekdo (Someone), novel, 1958
- Obala (The Coast), novel, 1959
- Mesto (The Town), short stories, 1961
- Na tekočem traku (On the Conveyor Belt), comic stories, 1962
- Rozalija (Rozalia), novel, 1963
- Vrtačnik, novel, 1963
- Druščina (The Company), novel, 1965
- Ruševine (The Ruin), novel, 1965
- Brusač (The Grinder), novel, 1965
- Poletje (The Summer), novel, 1966
- Pokopališče (The Graveyard), novel, 1968
- Leta in dnevi (Years and Days), short stories, 1972
- Leteči krožnik (The Flying Saucer), novel, 1976

For Children and Young Adults

- Teden ima sedem dni (The Week Has Seven Days), 1962
- Čudežni pisalni strojček (The Magic Typewriter), 1966
- Reporter Tejč poroča (Tejč the Reporter Reports), 1968
- Janko in njegov svet (Janko and His World), 1969
- Lov za ukradenimi milijoni (Hunting the Stolen Millions), 1969
- Tri zgodbe (Three Stories), 1970
- Zlata trobenta (The Golden Trumpet), 1971
- Sin Martin (The Son Martin), 1974
- Martin fantalin (The Boy Martin), 1976
- Majhne besede, velike reči (Small Words, Large Things), 1976
- Oblaček Pohajaček (Wanderer the Cloud), 1978
- Poklici (Occupations), 1978
- Fantje muzikantje (The Musical Lads), 1979
- Ta glavna Urša (Ursulla the Leader), 1981
- Mezinček in Mezinčica (Tom Thumb and Thumbelina), 1983
- Klip, klap in deček Mak (Clip, Clap and the Boy Mak), 1999
- Koza Filomena (Philomena the Goat), 1999
- Pes Pip (Pip the Dog), 1999
