= Vladimir Naglič =

- Born: 1896
- Died: 1966 (aged 69–70)
- Known for: Dictionary of Slovene Nautical Terms, translation work
- Awards: Levstik Award; 1951 for Kratke zanimivosti iz pomorstva

Vladimir Naglič (1896 – 1966) was a Slovene mariner and translator, known for his contribution to a Slovene Nautical Dictionary (Pomorska Slovenščina) published in 1961 in cooperation with Janez Gradišnik and contributor of nautical terms to the Dictionary of Slovene Literary Language.

In 1951 he won the Levstik Award for his book Kratke zanimivosti iz pomorstva (Interesting Facts about Seafaring). He also translated into Slovene a number of books related to seafaring and other subjects, both fiction and non-fiction, such as Ivan Yefremov's Stellar Ships (Slovene title: Zvezdne ladje), 1956, Frans G. Bengtsson's The Long Ships (Slovene title: Rdeči viking), 1960, Frank Thiess' The Voyage of Forgotten Men (Slovene title: Cušima - roman pomorske vojne), 1961, and Bertrand Russell's Common Sense and Nuclear Warfare (Slovene title: Pamet in atomska vojna), 1961.
