= Kristina Brenk =

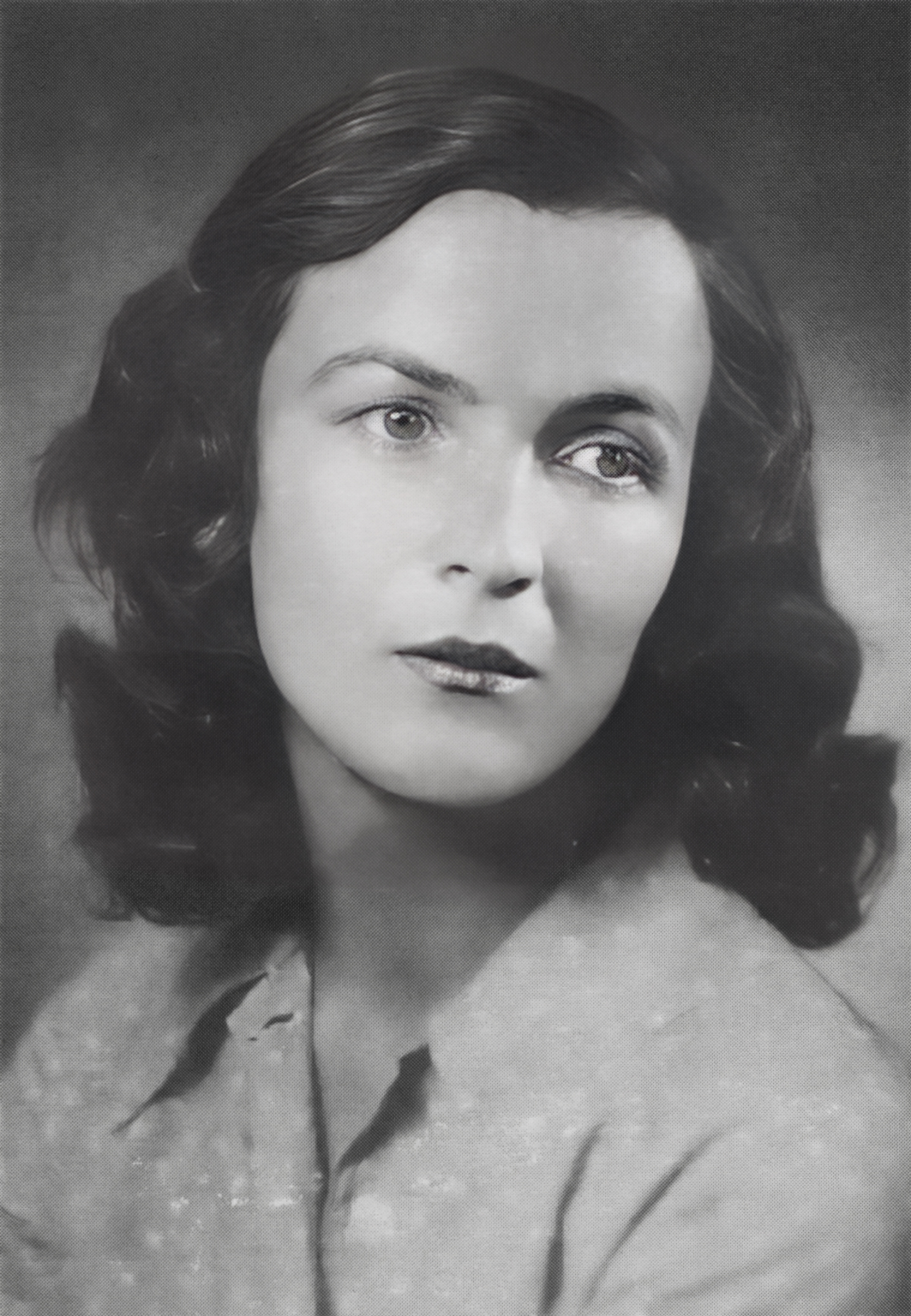
- Kristina Brenk in 1938
- Born: 22 October 1911; Horjul, Austria-Hungary (now in Slovenia)
- Died: 20 November 2009 (aged 98); Ljubljana, Slovenia
- Occupations: Writer, poet, translator and editor
- Writing career
- Notable works: Deklica Delfina in lisica Zvitorepka, Babica v cirkusu, Moja dolina
- Notable awards: Levstik Award; 1972 for Deklica Delfina in lisica Zvitorepka; Levstik Award; 1999 for Lifetime Achievement

Kristina Brenk née Vrhovec, also known as Kristina Brenkova (22 October 1911 – 20 November 2009) was a Slovene writer, poet, translator and editor, best known for her books for children.

Brenk was born in Horjul in what was then Austria-Hungary in 1911. She studied psychology and pedagogy at the University of Ljubljana and obtained her doctorate in 1939. During the Second World War she joined the Slovene Liberation Front. From 1949 until her retirement in 1973 she worked as an editor at the Mladinska Knjiga publishing house. In 1999 she received the Levstik Award for her lifetime achievement in children's writing. She died in Ljubljana and is buried at Žale.

An award for Best Original Slovene Picture Book bestowed since 2003 by the Slovenian Publishers Association was named after Kristina Brenk from 2011 onwards.

== Published works ==
- Košček sira (A Piece of Cheese), 1971
- Deklica Delfina in lisica Zvitorepka (The Girl Delphina and the Cunning Fox), 1972
- Prva domovina (First Motherland), 1973
- Kruh upanja (Bread of Hope), 1973
- Srebrna račka, zlata račka (Silver Duckling, Golden Duckling), 1975
- Čenča Marenča (Čenča Marenča), 1976
- Kako šteje Čenča Marenča (Čenča Marenča Counting), 1976
- Dobri sovaržnikov pes (The Enemy's Good Dog), 1980
- Hoja za bralci (Walking After Readers), 1980
- Babica v cirkusu (Grandma at the Circus), 1982
- Prigode koze Kunigunde (Tales of Cunigunda the Goat), 1984
- Moja dolina (My Valley), 1996
- Prišel je velikanski lev (The Giant Lion had Arrived), 2008
