= Zoran Jerin =

- Born: 13 February 1925; Celje, Slovenia
- Died: 6 February 2005 (aged 79); Ljubljana, Slovenia
- Occupations: journalist, writer and editor
- Writing career
- Notable awards: Levstik Award; 1978 for Himalaja, rad te imam

Zoran Jerin (13 February 1925 – 6 February 2005) was a Slovene journalist, writer and editor.

He won the Levstik Award in 1978 for his book Himalaja, rad te imam (Himalayas, I Love You) published after an expedition to the Himalayas in 1975, one of a total of seven journeys he made to Nepal and India.

== Published works ==
- Himalaja, rad te imam (Himalayas, I Love You), 1978
- Vzhodno od Katmanduja (West of Kathmandu), 1965
