= Savo Sovre =

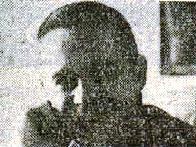
- Sovre in 1965.
- Born: 7 July 1928; Ormož, Slovenia
- Died: 2008 (aged 79–80); Ljubljana, Slovenia
- Education: Academy of Fine Arts, Ljubljana
- Known for: painting and illustrating
- Notable work: Painting and illustration
- Awards: Levstik Award; 1964 for Nemška vadnica

Savo Sovre (7 July 1928 – 2008) was a Slovene painter also known for his illustrations of children's books.

He won the Levstik Award in 1964 for his illustrations for a Primary School German Exercise Book, but also illustrated many picture books and children's magazines.

He founded the Sovre Art School in Ljubljana.
