= Anton Ramovš =

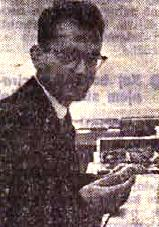
- Ramovš before 1962
- Born: 17 December 1924; Dolenja Vas, Slovenia
- Died: 1 May 2011 (aged 86); Kranj, Slovenia
- Awards: Levstik Award; 1961 for Zemlja skozi milijone let and Geološki izleti po ljubljanski okolici
- Scientific career
- Fields: geology and paleontology

Anton Ramovš (17 December 1924 – 1 May 2011) was a Slovene geologist and paleontologist.

Ramovš was born in Dolenja Vas near Železniki in 1924. He studied at the University of Ljubljana and graduated in 1950 and obtained his doctorate in 1956. He worked at the University of Ljubljana. His main area of research was petrographic and geological mapping. He died in 2011.

He won the Levstik Award in 1961 for his books Zemlja skozi milijone let and Geološki izleti po ljubljanski okolici (Earth Over Millions of Years and Geological Outings Around Ljubljana).

== Works ==
- Über die geologischen Untersuchungen im slowenischen Gebiet unter der Leitung der Geologischen Reichsanstalt in Wien von 1849 bis 1918. in: Abhandlungen der Geologischen Bundesanstalt, vol. 56/1 (1999), pp 69–94.
