= Breda Smolnikar =

- Born: 19 January 1941; Herceg Novi, Kingdom of Yugoslavia (now in Montenegro)
- Occupation: Writer
- Writing career
- Notable works: Otročki življenje teče dalje, Ko se tam gori olistajo breze
- Notable awards: Levstik Award; 1963 for Otročki, življenje teče dalje

Breda Smolnikar (born 19 January 1941), is a Slovene writer who has also published under the pseudonym Gospa. She writes for adults and young readers.

Smolnikar was born in Herceg Novi in 1941. After the outbreak of the Second World War the family moved to Slovenia. She studied textile engineering and worked in the textile industry for a number of years. She started writing young and got her first book Otročki življenje teče dalje (Children, Life Goes On) published in 1963 and won the Levstik Award for it that same year. In the 1980s she wrote adult fiction under the pseudonym Gospa. In 1998 she published her book Ko se tam gori olistajo breze (When the Birches Up There Are Greening) which brought a prolonged lawsuit upon the author and a prohibition on the sale of the book until the case was finally dismissed by the Slovenian Constitutional Court in 2005.

== Published works ==
- Otročki, življenje teče dalje (Children, Life Goes On), 1963
- Mali mozaik imen (The Small Mosaic of Names), 1967
- Popki (Belly Buttons), 1973
- Balada o divjem mleku (The Balad of Wild Milk), 1980
- Ko je umiral Stob (When Stob Was Dying), 1982
- Mrtvi Stob (Dead Stob), 1982
- Stobovske balade (Stob's Balads), 1985
- Ko se tam gori olistajo breze (When the Birches Up There Are Greening), 1998
- Stobovske elegije (Strob's Eulogies), 2002
- Spuščena zanka (The Loose Knot), 2003
- Ko se tam gori ne olistajo breze, (When the Birches Up There Are Not Greening), 2004 (Censored edition)
- Poletje v zgodbi V. (The Summer in A Story V.), 2006
- Škila, 2006
- Veliki slovenski tekst (The Great Slovene Text), 2010
