= Matjaž Schmidt =

Slovenian painter and illustrator (1948–2010)

- Born: 7 February 1948; Ljubljana, Slovenia
- Died: 29 September 2010 (aged 62); Ljubljana, Slovenia
- Education: Academy of Fine Arts, Ljubljana
- Known for: painting, drawing, illustrating
- Notable work: Children's books illustrations
- Awards: Levstik Award; 2009 for lifetime achievement

Matjaž Schmidt (7 February 1948 – 29 September 2010) was a Slovene artist and illustrator, best known for his children's books illustrations and comic strips.

== Biography ==
Schmidt was born in Ljubljana.

After high school, he attended the Faculty of Architecture. In 1968, he transferred to the Academy of Fine Arts in Ljubljana, where he specialized in illustration.

He was married to Jelka Godec Schmidt, who is also an illustrator.

In 2009, he won the Levstik Award for lifetime achievement in illustration.

He died in Ljubljana, Slovenia.
