= France Podrekar =

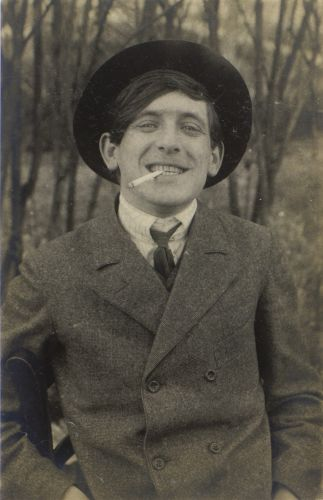
- Podrekar in the 1910s
- Born: 10 October 1887; Ljubljana, Slovenia
- Died: 23 January 1964 (aged 76)
- Education: Prague, Munich, Vienna
- Known for: painting, caricature
- Notable work: Painting, caricature and illustration
- Awards: Levstik Award; 1949 for Butalci

France Podrekar, sometimes referred to as Fran Podrekar, (10 October 1887 - 23 January 1964) was a Slovene painter known for his caricatures and illustrations.

Podrekar was born in Ljubljana in 1887. In 1906 he went to study painting in Prague and after two semesters continued his studies in Munich for a further six semesters between 1907 and 1910 and in Vienna from 1911 to 1912. He worked as an art teacher in Ljubljana and then as an art restorer. His illustrations and caricatures were published in numerous journals and magazines of the time. He died in Ljubljana.

He won the Levstik Award in 1949 for his illustrations of Fran Milčinski's Butalci.
