= Rajko Pavlovec =

- Born: 15 January 1932; Ljubljana, Drava Banovina, Kingdom of Yugoslavia
- Died: 25 August 2013 (aged 81); Ljubljana, Slovenia
- Awards: Levstik Award; 1976 for Kras
- Scientific career
- Fields: paleontology, stratigraphy and regional geology

Rajko Pavlovec (15 January 1932 – 25 August 2013) was a Slovene professor of geology, specialist in paleontology, stratigraphy and regional geology.

In 1976, he won the Levstik Award for his book Kras (Karst) on the geology of the Karst.

== Selected published works ==
- Startigrafski razvoj starejšega terciarja v južnozahodni Sloveniji s posebnim ozirom na numulite in asiline (The Stratigraphic Development of the Early Tertiary in South Eastern Slovenia with Particular Regard to Nummulites and Asilinae), 1962
- Istrske numulitine s posebnim ozirom na filogenezo in paleoekologijo (Istrian Nummulites With Special Regard to Phylogenesis and Palaeoecology), 1969
- Kras (Karst), 1976
- Iz življenja kontinentov (From the Lives of Continents), 1977
