= Miran Ogrin =

- Born: 1914
- Died: 1985 (aged 70–71); Ljubljana, Slovenia
- Occupations: journalist and travelogue writer
- Awards: Levstik Award; 1974 for Od Kalifornije do Ognjene zemlje

Miran Ogrin (1914–1985) was a Slovene journalist who worked for the Nedeljski dnevnik weekly newspaper. He travelled extensively and published a number of travelogues. His books are packed with factual information, but have been criticized for lacking a personal note.

He won the Levstik Award in 1974 for his book on travelling the length of the Americas Od Kalifornije do Ognjene zemlje (From California to the Land of Fire).

== Bibliography ==
- Daleč od civilizacije: življenje plemen ob Amazonki (Far from Civilization: the Lives of Tribes along the Amazon), 1956
- Srednji vzhod (The Middle East), 1961
- Od Nila do Karatgene (From the Nile to Carthage), 1967
- Širine sveta (The Breadths of the World), 1969
- Na jugi sveta (At the South of the World), 1969
- Od Kalifornije do Ognjene zemlje (From California to the Land of Fire), 1974
- Vzhodni veter: od Urala do Kitajske in arabskih pustinj (An Eastern Wind: From the Urals to China and the Arab Deserts), 1978
- Po stopinjah Aleksandra Velikega (Following the Footsteps of Alexander the Great), 1982
