= Evgen Sajovic =

- Born: 25 November 1913; Ljubljana, Slovenia
- Died: 1986
- Education: Academy of Fine Arts, Zagreb
- Known for: painting and illustrating
- Notable work: Painting and illustration
- Awards: Levstik Award; 1953 for Snežna kraljica in druge pravljice Prešeren Foundation Award; 1979 for his art

Evgen Sajovic (25 November 1913 – 1986) was a Slovene painter, also known for his frescos and sgraffito as well as book illustrations.

Sajovic was born in Ljubljana in 1913. He studied art at the Zagreb Academy of Fine Arts under Marino Tartaglia and graduated in 1938.

He won the Levstik Award in 1953 for his illustrations of Andersen's Snow Queen and other stories (Slovene title: Snežna kraljica in druge pravljice).

In 1979 he also won the Prešeren Foundation Award for his artistic achievements.
