= Lila Prap =

Children's writer and illustrator

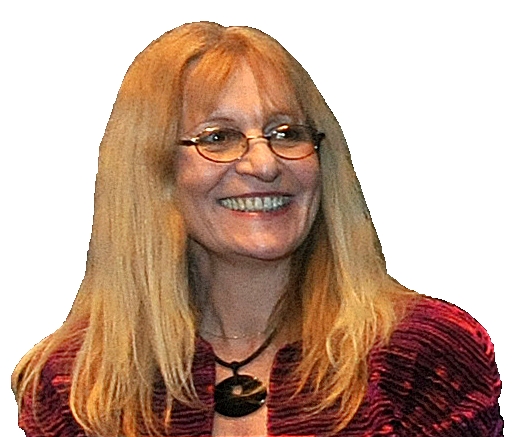
- Born: Lilijana Praprotnik Zupančič; 28 September 1955 (age 70); Celje, Slovenia
- Education: School of Architecrure at the University of Ljubljana
- Known for: architecture, illustrating, children's writer
- Notable work: Writing and illustrating children's books
- Awards: Levstik Award; 2001 for Male živali and Živalske uspavanke Prešeren Foundation Award; 2011 for exhibitions in Celje and Ljubljana
- Website: her homepage

Lilijana Praprotnik Zupančič (born 28 September 1955), known by the pen name Lila Prap, is a Slovene illustrator and writer. She is best known for her humorous children's picture books, published both in her native Slovenia and abroad.

== Life and work ==
Lila Prap was born in Celje in 1955. She studied architecture at the University of Ljubljana and worked as an architect before deciding to devote herself to graphic design and illustration.

Many of her books have been translated and published in France, Germany, Japan, the United States, China, and elsewhere.

=== Adaptations ===
Animated cartoons, based on her illustrations, have been televised on Japan's TV.

== Awards ==
In 2001, her illustrations in Little Creatures ("Male živali") and Animal Lullabies ("Živalske uspavanke") won her the Levstik Award in native Slovenia. In 2011, she won the Prešeren Foundation Award for exhibitions of her illustrations she held in Celje and Ljubljana.

== Selected works ==
- 2012 Why Do Cats ("Mačji zakaji")
- 2011 Why Do Bugs? ("Žuželčji zakaji")
- 2010 Why Do Dogs? ("Pasji zakaji")
- 2009 Dinasaurs?!'' ("Dinozavri?!")
- 2008 Where Do Dreams Go ("Kam gredo sanje")
- 2007 My Daddy ("Moj očka")
- 2005 1001 Fairy Tales ("1001 Pravljica")
- 2004 Animals International Dictionary ("Mednarodni živalski slovar")
- 2002 Animal Alphabet ("Živalska abeceda")
- 2002 Why? ("Zakaj?")
- 2002 Animal Lullabies("Živalske uspavanke")
- 2002 Little Creatures ("Male živali")
- 1999 True Fairy Tales ("Resnične pravljice in pripovedke")
- 1996 That is... ("To je...")
