= Slavko Kremenšek =

Slovene historian and ethnologist

- Born: 22 April 1931 (age 94)
- Awards: Levstik Award; 1972 for Slovensko študentovsko gibanje 1919–1941
- Scientific career
- Fields: history and ethnology

Slavko Kremenšek (born 22 April 1931) is a Slovene historian and ethnologist.

In 1972 he won the Levstik Award for his book Slovensko študentovsko gibanje 1919–1941 (The Slovene Student Movement, 1919–1941).
