= Ivan Bratko (publisher) =

- Born: 15 February 1914; Celje, Austria-Hungary (now in Slovenia)
- Died: 23 March 2001 (aged 87); Ljubljana, Slovenia
- Occupations: Officer; writer; publisher
- Writing career
- Notable work: Teleskop
- Notable awards: Levstik Award; 1955 for Teleskop

Ivan Bratko (15 February 1914 – 23 March 2001) was a Slovene writer and publisher, partisan and officer.

Bratko was born in Celje in 1914. He graduated in law from the University of Ljubljana in 1941. He was a member of the League of Communists of Yugoslavia from 1933 and published numerous articles and columns on socio-economic matters even before the Second World War. He was interned at Gonars concentration camp from where he escaped and joined the partisan. His escape from Gonars was also the inspiration for his best known book Teleskop (Telescope), for which he won the Levstik Award in 1954. From 1952 until his retirement in 1981 he worked as head of the DZS Publishing House.

He died in Ljubljana in 2001.

== Bibliography ==
- S poti po evropskem zapadu (On the Road in Western Europe), 1950
- Teleskop (Telescope), novel, 1954
- Pomlad v februarju (Spring in February), novel, 1957
- Vroči asfalt Evrope (The Hot Asphalt of Europe), short stories, 1962
- Rakete in sekvoje (Rockets and Sequoias), travelogue, 1965
- Dekletov dnevnik (A Girl's Diary), 1969
- Čas knjige (The Time of the Book), 1972
- Okrogla miza (Round Table), 1977
