= Roža Piščanec =

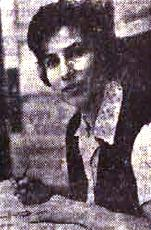
- Born: 7 July 1923; Lovrenc na Dravskem Polju, Slovenia
- Died: 29 September 2006 (aged 83); Ljubljana, Slovenia
- Education: Academy of Fine Arts, Ljubljana
- Known for: painting, illustrating
- Notable work: Painting and illustration
- Awards: Levstik Award; 1954 for Heidi; Levstik Award; 1961 for Medenjakova hišica

Roža Piščanec (7 July 1923 – 29 September 2006) was a Slovene painter also known for her illustrations of children's books and magazines.

She won the Levstik Award for her illustrations twice, in 1954 for her illustrations for Heidi and in 1961 for František Hrubín's Medenjakova hišica (Medenjak's House). Probably her best known illustrated work is the story Kdo je napravil Vidku srajčico (Who Made Little Vid a Shirt) by Fran Levstik, first published in 1955.
