= Janez Stanič =

- Born: 4 January 1937; Ljubljana, Kingdom of Yugoslavia (now Slovenia)
- Died: 28 October 1996 (aged 59); Ljubljana, Slovenia
- Occupations: journalist and translator
- Writing career
- Notable awards: Levstik Award; 1968 for Onkraj Kremlja

Janez Stanič (4 January 1937 – 28 October 1996) was a Slovene journalist and translator. He was considered one of the best socio-political analysts of his generation and was often outspoken and critical of the Soviet regime.

Stanič was born in Ljubljana in 1937. He studied Slovene and Russian at the University of Ljubljana and graduated in 1961. He worked for the newspaper Delo, first as their Moscow correspondent and later as an editor. From 1975 he worked at the Slovene National Broadcaster and from 1991 as head of the Cankarjeva Založba publishing house. He died in Ljubljana in 1996.

He won the Levstik Award in 1968 for his book Onkraj Kremlja (The Other Side of the Kremlin).

== Selected published works ==
- Onkraj Kremlja (The Other Side of the Kremlin), 1968
- Češkoslovaška nevarnost, Praška pomlad in Praška zima (The Czechoslovak Danger, Prague Spring and Prague Winter), 1969
- Znana in neznana Sovjetska Zveza (The Known and Unknown Soviet Union), 1978
- Razpotja komunizma (Communismns Crossroads), 1980
- Bele lise socializma (White Patches of Socialism), 1986
- Kronike preloma (Chronicles of the Turning Point), collection of articles from 1985 to 1995), 1997
