= Miroslav Adlešič =

Slovenian physicist

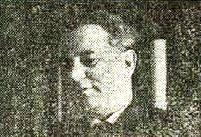
- Born: 13 December 1907; Postojna, Slovenia
- Died: 9 February 2002 (aged 94); Ljubljana, Slovenia
- Awards: Levstik Award; 1952 for Od mehanike do elektronike Levstik Award; 1957 for Svet svetlobe in barv Levstik Award; 1964 for Svet zvoka in glasbe
- Scientific career
- Fields: physics

Miroslav Adlešič (13 December 1907 – 9 February 2002) was a Slovene physicist, specialist in acoustics, author of numerous books and textbooks on physics.

Adlešič was born in Postojna in 1907. He graduated from the University of Ljubljana in 1930. For a long time taught in secondary schools and from 1961 lectured in experimental physics, biophysics and musical acoustics at the Ljubljana Academy of Music. He wrote a number of popular science books as well as school textbooks on physics. He died in 2002.

For his popular science books he won the Levstik Award three times, in 1952 for his book Od mehanike do elektronike (From Mechanics to Electronics), 1957 for Svet svetlobe in barv (The World of Light and Colours) and in 1964 for Svet zvoka in glasbe (The World of Sound and Music).
