= Berta Golob =

Slovene writer (born 1932)

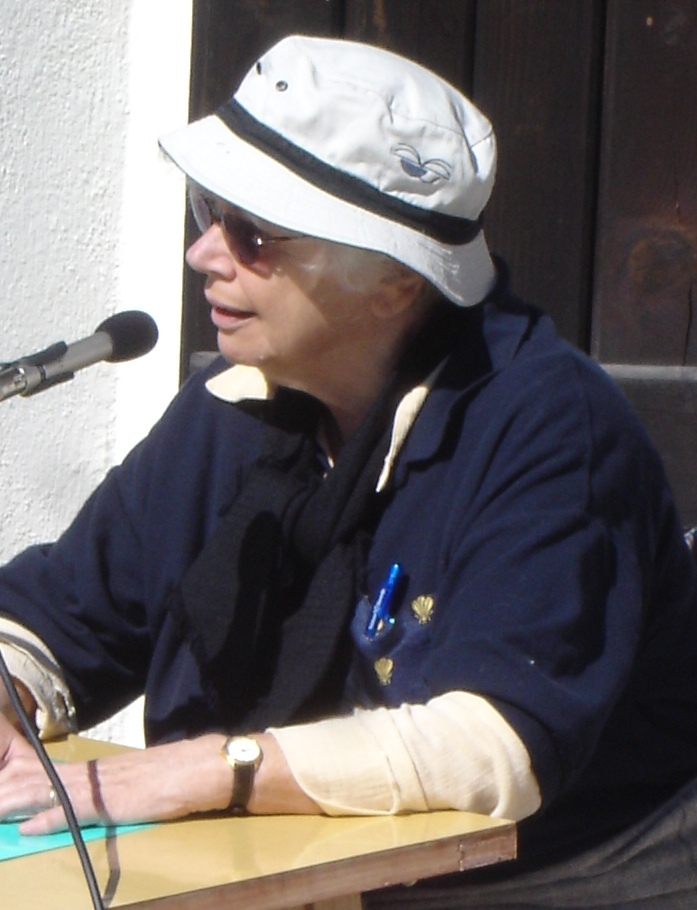
- Golob in 2007
- Born: 9 August 1932 (age 94); Struževo, Slovenia
- Occupations: Writer, poet, librarian and teacher
- Writing career
- Notable awards: Levstik Award; 1982 for Žive besede

Berta Golob (born 9 August 1932) is a Slovene writer and poet, a retired teacher and librarian.

Golob was born in Struževo which is now part of Kranj in 1932. She studied Slavistics at the University of Ljubljana and worked as a teacher and librarian. She is a prolific writer of children's books, in recent years mostly on religious subjects and has also published four poetry collections that also have a religious theme.

In 1982 she won the Levstik Award for her book Žive besede (Living Words).

== Selected published works ==
- Sovražim vas (I Hate You), 1976
- Znani obrazi (Well Known Faces), 1980
- Drobne zgodbe (Tiny Stories), 1980
- Žive besede (Living Words), 1982
- Skrinja iz babičine bale (The Chest from Grandma's Dowry), 1983
- Srce ustvarja, roka piše: srečanja z mladinskimi pisatelji (The Heart Creates, the Hand Writes: Meetings with Youth Writers), 1983
- Sporočanje v Ptičjem logu (Informing in Birds Wood), 1984
- Jezikovni vozli (Tongue Twisters), 1988
- Igrarije, besedne čarovnije (Playful Magic of Words), 1988
- Kako visoko je nebo (How High Is The Sky?), 1990
- Šolske razglednice (School Postcards), 1990
- Kažipotja med šolo in domom (Roadsigns from School to Home), 1990
- Med nama, Gospod (Between Us, Lord), 1992
- Dežela Slovničarija (The World of Grammar), 1992
- O nerodovitni smokvi (On the Fruitless Fig Tree), 1994
- O bahavem in skromnem možu (On the Boastful and the Humble Man), 1994
- O sejalcu in semenu (On the Sower and the Seeds), 1994
- K blagoslovu nesejo veseli (They Go Happily to the Blessing), 1994
- Sveti Miklavž: pobarvanka (Saint Nicholas: A Colouring Book), 1994
- Pastirica Urška (Urška the Shepherdess), 1994
- Do zvezd in nazaj (To the Stars and Back), 1995
- Slovnica, odčarana čarovnica (Grammar the Enchanted Witch), 1995
- Sveti Martin (Saint Martin), 1995
- O izgubljenem sinu: svetopisemska prilika (On the Prodigal Son: a Biblical Parable), 1995
- Anton Martin Slomšek (Anton Martin Slomšek), 1996
- Daljna preteklost naše vasi (the Distant Past of Out Village), 1997
- Bela žena, divji mož (White maiden, Wild Man), 1997
- Sveti Frančišek, brat cvetic in živali (Saint Frances, Brother of Flowers and Animals), 1997
- Škof Baraga (Bishop Baraga), 1997
- Mati Terezija, dobri angel Kalkute (Mother Tereza, the Good Angel of Calcutta), 1998
- Blaženi škof Anton Martin (The Blessed Bishop Anton Martin), 1998
- Marija Pomagaj na Brezjah (Mary Help at Brezje), 1998
- Senca svetlobe (The Shadow of Light), 1999
- Kam ljudje hitijo? (Where Are People Rushing To), 1999
- Sveti Jurij – Zeleni Jurij (Saint George – Green George), 1999
- Marijine srajčke (Mary's Vests), 1999
- Daljave prihodnosti (The Distances of the Future), 1999
- Zrna dedove modrosti (Grains of Grandpa's Wisdom), 2000
- Janez Krstnik (John the Baptist), 2000
- Kam ta romar roma (Where Does the Pilgrim Go To), 2000
- Z Gospodom na križevem potu (On the Way of the Cross with the Lord), 2000
- Napisal je knjigo (He Wrote a Book), 2001
- Pri nas je veselo: sedem igric za otroke (We Are Having Fun: Seven Games for Children), 2001
- K sveti maši gremo (We Attend Holy Mass), 2002
- Črna suknja: Friderik Irenej Baraga (The Black Cape: Frederic Baraga), 2002
- Pod križem močna žena (A Strong Woman Under the Cross), 2002
- Pogledi s hišnega praga (Views from the Doorstep), 2003
- Skriti zaklad: premišljevanje skrivnosti rožnega venca (The Hidden Treasure: The Reflective Mysteries of the Rosary), 2003
- Božič prihaja (Christmas is Coming), 2003
- Bodi svetloba: krščanstvo – izročilo in sporočilo (Be the Light: Christianity – Tradition and Message), 2003
- Sandale in sari: blažena Mati Terezija iz Kalkute (Sandals and the Sari: the Blessed Mother Tereza of Calcutta), 2004
- Svetilniki (Beacons), 2006
- Kje je sreča doma? (Where is Happiness at Home), 2007
- Preprosto pismo v raj (A Limpe Letter to Paradise), 2008
- Kruh življenja, miru in dobrote: sv. Elizabeta Avstroogrska: 800-letnica njenega rojstva (The Bread of Life, Peace and Kindness: Saint Elizabeth of Hungary: the 800th Anniversary of Her Birth), 2008
- V zrcalu evharistije (Reflecting the Eucharist), 2009
- Oče Damijan: misijonar, ki je objemal gobavce (Father Damian: the Missionary With the Lepers), 2009
- Vse to se je zgodilo (All This Happened), 2009
- Lastovka išče dom (The Swallow Seeks a Home), 2010
- Mučenec Lojze Grozde: »jaz sem neskončno drevo« (The Martyr Lojze Grozde: "I Am an Infinite Tree"), 2010
