= Levstik Award =

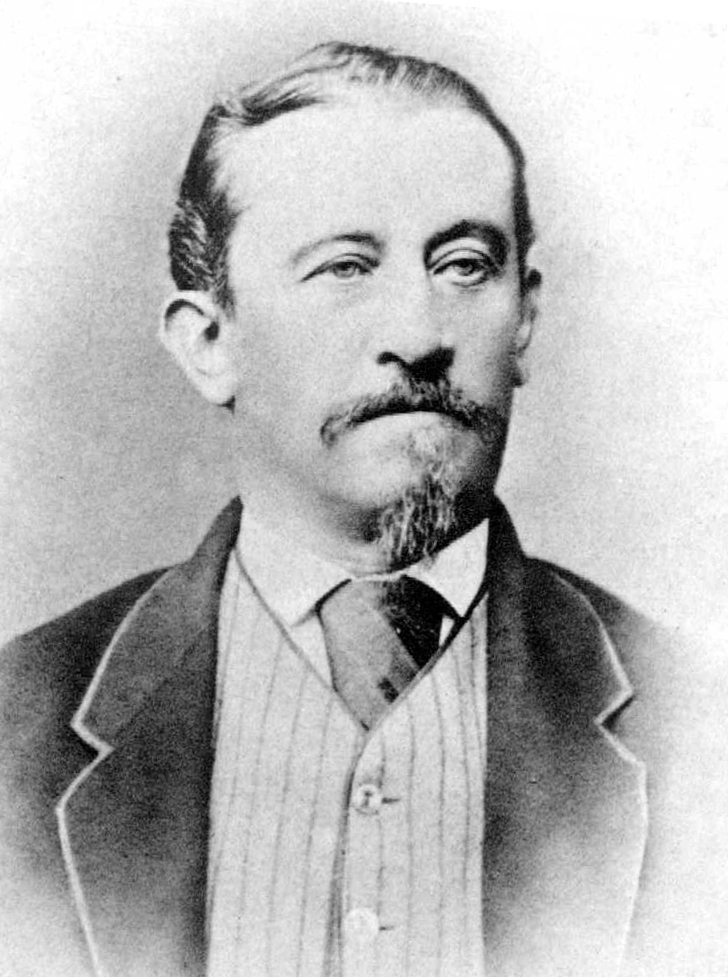
Fran Levstik, Slovenian writer

The Levstik Award (Slovene: Levstikova nagrada) is a literary award in Slovenia awarded for achievements in children's literature. It has been bestowed since 1949 by the Mladinska Knjiga Publishing House, making it the first literary award established by a Slovene publishing house after the Second World War. It includes a prize for original works of literature, original illustrations, and non-fiction books for children.

Up until 1989, it was awarded annually. Since then it has been awarded biannually. In the prize category for books only books published by the Mladinska Knjiga Publishing House are eligible for entry, but since 1999 the award for lifetime achievements in children's literature is the most prestigious award of its kind in Slovenia. The award is named after the 19th century Slovene writer, political activist and playwright Fran Levstik who also wrote works for children.

== Levstik Award laureates ==
Year	Award for Lifetime Achievement in writing	Award for Lifetime Achievement in illustration
2013	Neža Maurer	Danijel Demšar
2011	Svetlana Makarovič	Kostja Gatnik
2009	Polonca Kovač	Matjaž Schmidt
2007	Niko Grafenauer	Marjan Manček
2005	Dane Zajc	Jelka Reichman
2003	Tone Pavček	Marjanca Jemec Božič
2001	Kajetan Kovič	Ančka Gošnik Godec
1999	Kristina Brenk	Marlenka Stupica

Year	Award for Best Original Work of Literature	Original Title	Title in English
2013	Barbara Simoniti	Močvirniki	Marsh Creatures
2011	Majda Koren	Mici iz 2. a	Mici from Class 2A
2009	Andrej Rozman - Roza	100 + 1 uganka	100 + 1 Riddles
2007	Anja Štefan	Kotiček na koncu sveta	The Little Corner at the End of the World
2005	Desa Muck	Anica	Anica (collection of stories)
2003	Mojca Osojnik	Hiša, ki bi rada imela sonce	The House That Wanted to Be in the Sun
2001	Anja Štefan	Melje, melje, mlinček	Grind, Grind, Little Mill
1999	Andrej Rozman - Roza	Črvive pesmi	Wormy Poems
1997	Dim Zupan	Leteči mački	Flying Cats
1995	Neli Kodrič	Lov na zvezde	Hunting for Stars
1993	Vida Jeraj Hribar	Večerna sonata	Evening Sonata
1991	Lojze Krakar	Prišel je lev	The Lion Came
1989	Marija Vojskovič	Hiša številka 15	House No. 15
1988	Miroslav Košuta	Na Krasu je krasno	The Karst is Awesome (poems)
1987	Niko Grafenauer	Majhnica	The Diminutive
1986	Mate Dolenc	Morska dežela na železniški postaji	The Land of Sea at the Railway Station
1985	Kajetan Kovič	Pajacek in punčka	The Clown and the Little Girl
1984	Vida Brest	Majhen človek na veliki poti	Little Man on a Long Road
1983	Vitomil Zupan	Potovanje v tisočera mesta	Travels to Myriad Towns
1982	Tone Partljič	Hotel sem prijeti sonce	I Wanted to Grasp the Sun
1981	Branko Hofman	Ringo Star	Ringo Star
1980	Niko Grafenauer	Nebotičniki, sedite	Skyscrapers, Be Seated
1979	Leopold Suhodolčan	Piko Dinozaver and other books	Piko the Dinosaur
1979	Saša Vegri	Mama pravi, da v očkovi glavi	Mum Says that in Dad's Head
1978	Slavko Pregl	Geniji v kratkih hlačah	Geniuses in Shorts
1977	Dane Zajc	Abecedarija	Alphabetary
1976	Jože Snoj	Avtomoto mravlje and Pesmi za punčke	Automotive Ants and Poems for Girls
1975	Svetlana Makarovič	Kam, kam, kosovirja?, Kosovirja na leteči žlici and Pekarna Mišmaš	Where to, Kosovirs?, The Kosovirs on the Flying Spoon and The Mishmash Bakery
1974	Ferdo Godina	Sezidala si bova hišico	We Shall Build Ourselves a House
1973	Svetlana Makarovič	Miška spi	The Little Mouse Sleeps
1972	Kristina Brenk	Deklica Delfina in lisica Zvitorepka	The Girl Delphine and the Cunning Fox
1971	Lojze Zupanc	Zlato pod Blegošem	Gοld Under Mount Blegoš
1971	Janez Bitenc	Ciciban poje	Ciciban Sings
1970	France Forstnerič	Srakač	The Magpie
1970	Jože Šmit	Kako bomo umirali	How We Shall be Dying
1969	Jože Snoj	Barabakos in kosi	Barabablack and the Blackbirds
1969	Ivo Zorman	V tem mesecu se osipa mak	The Month the Poppy Blossoms Scatter
1968	Smiljan Rozman	Reporter Tejč poroča	Tejč the Reporter Reports
1967	Anton Ingolič	Gimnazijka	High-School Girl
1966	Jože Ciuha	Potovanje v deseto deželo	Voyage To the Tenth Land
1966	Branka Jurca	Vohljači in prepovedane skrivnosti	The Snoopers and the Forbidden Secrets
1965	Leopold Suhodolčan	Velikan in Pajac	The Giant and the Clown
1964	France Avčin	Kjer tišina šepeta	Where the Silence Whispers
1963	Kajetan Kovič	Franca izpod klanca	Franca from Under the Hill
1963	Breda Smolnikar	Otročki, življenje teče dalje	Children, Life Goes On
1962	Lojze Krakar	Sonce v knjigi	The Sun in a Book
1961	Tone Pavček	Velesenzacija	Megasensation
1961	Vid Pečjak	Drejček in trije Marsovčki	Andy and the Three Martians
1960	Branka Jurca	Okoli in okoli	Round and Round
1960	Janez Kajzer	Mimo dnevnega načrta	Beyond the Daily Plan
1959	Frane Milčinski - Ježek	Zvezdica Zaspanka	The Sleepy Little Star
1958	Anton Ingolič	Tajno društvo PGC	The Secret Society PGC
1958	Tone Pavček	Juri-Muri v Afriki	Juri-Muri in Africa
1957	Lojze Zupanc	Povodni mož v Savinji	The River Merman of the Savinja
1956	Miško Kranjec	Čarni nasmeh	Enchanting Smile
1956	Ela Peroci	Tisočkratlepa	Thousandtimeslovely
1955	Ela Peroci	Moj dežnik je lahko balon	My Umbrella Can Be a Balloon
1955	Josip Ribičič	Rdeča pest	Red Fist
1955	Tone Seliškar	Posadka brez ladje	Crew Without a Ship
1954	Ivan Bratko	Teleskop	Telescope
1953	Fran Saleški Finžgar	Iz mladih dni	From the Days of My Youth
1953	Miško Kranjec	Imel sem jih rad	I Liked Them
1951	France Bevk	Mali upornik	The Young Rebel
1950	Pavel Golia	Sneguljčica	Snow White (play)
1949	France Bevk	Tonček	Tony
1949	Prežihov Voranc	Solzice	Lilies of the Valley
1949	Josip Ribičič	Tinče in Binče	Tinče and Binče
1949	Tone Seliškar	Mule	The Mules

Year	Award for Best Original Illustration	Original Title	Title in English
2013	Peter Škerl	Močvirniki	Marsh Creatures
2011	Damijan Stepančič	Zgodba o sidru	The Story of the Anchor
2009	Svjetlan Junaković	100 + 1 uganka	100 + 1 Riddles
2007	Alenka Sottler	Pepelka	Cinderella
2005	Suzana Bricelj	Mala nočna torta s plameni	A Small Night Cake With Flames
2003	Damijan Stepančič	Leteči krožnik na našem vrtu	A Flying Saucer in Our Garden
2001	Lila Prap	Male živali and Živalske uspavanke	Small Animals and Animal Lullabies
1999	Zvonko Čoh	Enci benci na kamenci	children's folk limericks
1997	Jelka Godec Schmidt	Bisernica: slovenske kratke pripovedi za otroke	Bisernica: Traditional Short Stories for Children
1993	Wang Huiqin	Brokatna podoba	Image in Brocade
1991	Dušan Muc	Kronika ljubezenskih pripetljajev	A Chronicle of Amorous Incidents
1989	Miroslav Šuput	Begavka po valovih	She Who Runs on the Waves
1988	Zvonko Čoh	Račka Puhačka and Rastoče težave Jadrana Krta	The Fluffy Duckling and The Growing Pains of Adrian Mole
1987	Dušan Petričić	Guliver med pritlikavci	Gulliver in Lilliput
1986	Andrej Trobentar	Waitapu and Pavji rep in druge kitajske basni	Waitapu and The Peacock's Tail and Other Chinese Fables
1985	Marija Lucija Stupica	Pastirica in dimnikar	The Shepherdess and the Chimney Sweep
1984	Danijel Demšar	Kuža Luža and Mama žaba in žabčki and Kužmucke	Puddles the Dog and Mother Frog and Froggies and Puppykittens
1983	Marija Lucija Stupica	Leteči kovček and Regica in Skokica	The Flying Trunk and Frog and Toad
1982	Kostja Gatnik	Mrzla reka and Nove prigode profesorja Modrinjaka	Cold River and The New Adventures of Professor Branestawm
1981	Kamila Volčanšek	Kralj Drozgobrad	King Thrushbeard
1980	Marjanca Jemec Božič	Ko Nina spi and Deževen dan je krasen dan and others	When Nina Sleeps and A Rainy Day is a Wonderful Day
1979	Jelka Reichman	Cepecepetavček	Cepecepetavček
1978	Marjan Amalietti	Netočka Nezvanova and Ulenspiegel	Netochka Nezvanova and Ulenspiegel
1977	Marjan Manček	Kozlovska sodba v Višnji gori	The Goat Trial in Višnja Gora
1976	Ivan Seljak - Čopič	Afriške pripovedke and Robinson Crusoe	African Tales and Robinson Crusoe
1975	Milan Bizovičar	Abecedarija	Alphabetary
1974	Milan Bizovičar	Možiček med dimniki	A Man Amidst the Chimneys
1973	Marija Lucija Stupica	Kraljična na zrnu graha	The Princess and the Pea
1972	Božo Kos	Rodiš se samo enkrat	You Are Only Born Once
1971	Ive Šubic	Kos rženega kruha	A Slice of Rye Bread
1970	Marlenka Stupica	Krojaček Hlaček and Številke and Babica v cirkusu	Trooser The Tailor and Numbers and Grandma at the Circus
1969	Lidija Osterc	Laponske pripovedi and Strašni lovec Bumbum and Očala tete Bajavaje	Tales from Lapland and Bumbum the Terrifying Hunter and Aunt Bajavaja's Specs
1969	Ive Šubic	Mladost v džungli	Youth in the Jungle
1968	Božo Kos	Veliki in mali kapitan and Kavboj Pipec in Rdeča pesa	Captain Big and Captain Little and Pipec the Cowboy and Red Beat
1967	Milan Bizovičar	Solzice and Salomonovi rudniki	Lillies of the Valley and King Solomon's Mines
1967	Jože Ciuha and Ive Šubic	Jugoslavija	Yugoslavia
1966	Jože Ciuha	Gospod Baroda in druge ljudske pesmi	Mr Baroda and Other Traditional Songs
1966	Aco Mavec	Otok zakladov	Treasure Island
1966	Lidija Osterc	Lonček, kuhaj! and Sneguljčica	The Magic Porridge Pot and Snow White
1965	Jože Ciuha	Pomlad ob Soči and Deček Jarbol and Nina na Ceylonu	Spring by the River Soča and The Boy Jarbol and Nina in Ceylon
1965	Melita Vovk	Basni and Puhek v Benetkah and Pustov god	Fables and Puhek in Venice and Pust's Birthday
1964	Ančka Gošnik Godec	Za lahko noč and O treh grahih and Zlata ptica	For Goodnight and About Three Peas and The Golden Bird
1964	Lidija Osterc	Hišica iz kock	House of Building Blocks
1964	Savo Sovre	Nemška vadnica za 5. in 6. razred osnovne šole	German Exercise Book for 5th and 6th Class of Primary School
1964	Tone Žnidaršič	Nauk o človeku za 7. razred osnovnih šol	On the Human Body for 7th Class of Primary School
1963	Štefan Planinc	Pesmi za otroke	Songs for Children
1963	Ivan Seljak - Čopič	Aska in volk	Aska and the Wolf
1962	Milan Bizovičar	Zgodbe iz mesta Rič-Rač	Tales from Rič-Rač Town
1962	Cita Potokar	Lizike za vse	Lollipops for All
1961	Roža Piščanec	Medenjakova hišica	Medenjak's House
1960	Ančka Gošnik Godec	Ptičke so odletele and Deček in gozd and Vile	The Birds Have Flown Away and The Boy and the Forrest and Fairies
1960	Marlenka Stupica	Ostržek	Pinocchio
1959	Štefan Planinc	Sinička nas je obiskala and Prvi ljudje na Mesecu and Karkažu	The Bluetit Visited Us and The First Men in the Moon and Carcajou
1959	Marij Pregelj	Starec in morje	The Old Man and the Sea
1959	Nikolaj Omersa	Skrivnostni jezdec and Pisani svet and Pogumni kapitani	The Mysterious Rider and Colourful World and Captains Courageous
1959	Marlenka Stupica	Pastir	The Shepherd
1959	Štefan Planinc	Tajno društvo PGC and Živali v ukrivljenem zrcalu	The PGC Secret Society and Animals in a Curved Mirror
1958	Milan Bizovičar	Maghellanovo potovanje okoli sveta	Magellan's Journey Around the World (cartoon in journal)
1957	Marij Pregelj	Beli očnjak	White Fang
1957	Melita Vovk	Zgode in nezgode kraljevskega dvora	Tales and Mishaps of the Royal Court
1956	France Mihelič	Štirje letni časi	The Four Seasons
1956	Maksim Sedej	Potovanje v tisočera mesta and Pastirček	Travels to a Thousand Towns and The Little Shepheard Boy
1955	Nikolaj Omersa	Zajčkov zvonček	Bunny's Bell
1955	Ivan Seljak - Čopič	Knjiga o Titu and Posadka brez ladje	The Book About Tito and The Crew Without a Ship
1954	Jože Ciuha	Cekin	The Coin
1954	Roža Piščanec	Heidi	Heidi
1954	Maksim Sedej	Racko in Lija	Racko and Lija
1954	Marlenka Stupica	Trnuljčica	Sleeping Beauty
1953	Evgen Sajovic	Snežna kraljica in druge pravljice	The Snow Queen and other stories
1953	Maksim Sedej	Tisoč in ena noč	One Thousand and One Nights
1952	Boris Kobe	Visoška kronika	The Visoko Chronicles
1952	Rado Krošelj	Barčica	The Little Boat
1952	France Mihelič	Pestrna	The Child Minder
1952	Marlenka Stupica	Mehurčki	Bubbles
1952	Janez Vidic	Letni časi	The Seasons
1951	Gvido Birolla	Trije bratje in trije razbojniki	Three Brothers and Three Robbers
1951	France Mihelič	Najdihojca	Najdihojca
1951	Slavko Pengov	Pod svobodnim soncem	Under A Free Sun
1951	Dušan Petrič	Kaj je videl Mižek Figa	What Mižek Figa Saw
1951	Ive Šubic	Kralj Matjaž reši svojo nevesto	King Matjaž Saves his Bride
1951	Janez Vidic	Živalske pripovedke	Animal Tales
1950	Tone Kralj	Pravljica o carjeviču Jeruslanu	The Story of Prince Jeruslan
1950	Nikolaj Omersa	Zgodbe o živalih	Stories about Animals
1950	Marlenka Stupica	Na Krasu	On The Carst
1950	Janez Vidic	Premagane zverine	Defeated Beasts
1949	Maksim Gaspari	Čuri-Muri velikan	The Monster Cockroach
1949	France Mihelič	Solzice	Lillies of the Valley
1949	Marij Pregelj	Otroška leta	My Childhood Years
1949	France Podrekar	Butalci	Dumbville
1949	Ive Šubic	Nejček	Nejček

Year	Award for Best Non-fiction Book for Children	Original Title	Title in English
1997	Viljenka Jalovec	Stavnica	Alphabet and Picture Bets
1993	Samo Kuščer	Energija	Energy
1991	Aleksander Konjajev	Nejc in drobnoživke	Nejc and Tiny Bugs
1989	Janez Strnad	Iz take so snovi kot sanje	From the Stuff of Dreams
1988	Manca Košir	Mladi novinar	The Young Journalist
1988	Alenka Goljevšček	Med bogovi in demoni: liki iz slovenske mitologije	Amongst Gods and Daemons: Figures from Slovene Mythology
1987	Samo Kuščer	Logo in računalnik	Logo and Computers
1986	Jana Milčinski	Lukec dobi sestrico	Lukec Gets a Sister
1985	Tita Kovač Artemis	Kemiki skozi stoletja	Chemists Through the Centuries
1984	Aleksander Konjajev	Nevidni živi svet	The Invisible Living World
1983	Matjaž Schmidt	Nejčev prvi leksikon	Nejc's First Dictionary
1982	Berta Golob	Žive besede	Living Words
1981	Pavel Kunaver	Pravljica in resnica o zvezdah	The Story and Truth About the Stars
1980	Marijan Prosen	Utrinki iz astronomije	Flashes from Astronomy
1979	Marija Makarovič	Kmečka abeceda and Kmečko gospodarstvo na Slovenskem	The Farmer's Alphabet and Farm Management in Slovenia
1978	Zoran Jerin	Himalaja, rad te imam	Himalayas, I Love You
1977	Jože Pahor	Dogodivščine v atomskem inštitutu	At the Atomic Institute
1976	Rajko Pavlovec	Kras	The Karst
1975	Kazimir Tarman	Zakaj, zato v ekologiji	Questions and Answers in Ecology
1974	Miran Ogrin	Od Kalifornije do Ognjene zemlje	From California to the Land of Fire (travelogue)
1972	Slavko Kremenšek	Slovensko študentovsko gibanje 1919–1941	The Slovene Student Movement 1919 – 1941
1971	Luc Menaše	Evropski umetnostnozgodovinski leksikon	European Art Historical Dictionary
1970	Jovan Hadži	Razvojna pota živalstva	The Development of Animals
1969	Stanko Kotnik	Po domovih naših pisateljev	In the Homes of Our Writers
1968	Janez Stanič	Onkraj Kremlja	The Other Side of the Kremlin
1968	Alenka Gerlovič	Likovni pouk otrok	Art Classes for Children
1967	France Planina	Jugoslavija	Yugoslavia
1965	Joško Battestin	Mikroskop Pionir	The Pioneer Microscope
1964	Miroslav Adlešič	Svet zvoka in glasbe	The World of Sound and Music
1963	Ciril Cvetko	Opera in njeni mojstri	The Opera and Its Masters
1962	Miha Likar	Virusi, Bakterije in Glivice	Viruses, Bacteria and Fungi
1961	Anton Ramovš	Zemlja skozi milijone let and Geološki izleti po ljubljanski okolici	Earth Over Millions of Years and Geological Outings Around Ljubljana
1960	France Križanič	Križem po matematiki and Elektronski aritmetični računalniki	Across Maths and Electronic Calculators
1959	Lavo Čermelj	Z raketo v vesolje	A Rocket for Space
1958	Robert Neubauer	Ceylon	Ceylon
1958	Dušan Savnik	Svet nasprotij	A World of Opposites
1957	Miroslav Adlešič	Svet svetlobe in barv	The World of Light and Colours
1957	Miroslav Zei	Iz življenja sesalcev	The Lives of Mammals
1956	Janez Matjašič	Iz življenja najmanjših	From the Lives of the Smallest
1955	Božo Škerlj	Neznana Amerika	Unknown America
1954	Božo Petek	Letalsko modelarstvo	Model Airplanes
1953	Lavo Čermelj	Nikola Tesla in razvoj elektrotehnike	Nikola Tesla and the Development of Electrotechins
1952	Miroslav Adlešič	Od mehanike do elektronike	From Mechanics to Electronics
1952	Anton Polenec	Iz življenja pajkov	The Life of Spiders
1952	Miroslav Zei	Iz ribjega sveta	The World of Fish
1951	France Križanič	Kratkočasna matematika	Maths for Fun
1951	Drago Matanović	Pogled v elektrotehniko	A Look at Electrotechnics
1951	Vladimir Naglič	Kratke zanimivosti iz pomorstva	Interesting Facts about Seafaring
1951	Jože Pahor	Hodil po zemlji sem naši	I Walked Our Land
1950	Anton Polenec	Iz življenja žuželk	The Lives of Insects
1949	Katja Špur	for her journalistic work	
