= Joško Battestin =

- Born: 14 March 1918; Ljubljana, Slovenia
- Died: 21 September 2020 (aged 102); Ljubljana, Slovenia
- Awards: Levstik Award; 1965 for Mikroskop Pionir
- Scientific career
- Fields: physics

Joško Battestin (14 March 1918 – 21 September 2020) was a Slovene electrical engineer, inventor, physics teacher and author of a number of books on experiments in physics, many aimed at aiding the understanding of the subject by secondary school students.

Amongst his publications is a book on graphology, expanding on the theories of Ludwig Klages that Battestin published in 2008 at the age of 91. In 1965 he won the Levstik Award for his book Mikroskop Pionir (The Pioneer Microscope). He turned 100 in March 2018. In September 2019, it was reported that Battestin, 101, lived in a care home for elderly residents. He died in Ljubljana on 21 September 2020 at the age of 102.

== Selected published works ==
- Osnove grafologije (The Basics of Graphology), 2008 (also published in French in 2011, Les bases de la graphologie)
- Preskusi iz optike (Experiments in Optics), 2004
- Preskusi iz mehanike (Experiments in Mechanics), 1994
- Optika – osnove in meritve (Optics – the Basics and Measurements), 1991
- Fizikalni praktikum I – mehanika, zvok in valovanje (The Physics Lab I – mechanics, sound and waves), 1985
- Fizikalni praktikum II – elektrika in magnetizem (The Physics Lab II – electricity and magnetism), 1983
- Mikroskop pionir (The Pioneer Microscope), 1963
