= Majda Koren =

Slovene children's writer and teacher (born 1960)

- Born: 12 March 1960 (age 66); Ljubljana, Socialist Federal Republic of Yugoslavia (now in Slovenia)
- Occupations: writer and teacher
- Writing career
- Notable works: Mici iz 2. a, Eva in kozel
- Notable awards: Levstik Award; 2011 for Mici iz 2. a

Majda Koren (born 12 March 1960) is a Slovene children's writer and teacher. She also works with the youth programme section of Radiotelevizija Slovenija, the Slovenian national broadcaster.

Koren was born in Ljubljana in 1960. She studied at the Faculty of Education at the University of Ljubljana and works as a primary school teacher in Spodnja Šiška. She is also editor and co-author of a website for young children (www.zupca.net), which is meant for the youngest web surfers. Her book Eva in Kozel (Eva and the Goat) was included in the 2008 White Ravens Awards of the International Youth Library a list of 250 best newly published books for children.

== Published works ==
- Zgodbice za matematiko (Stories With Maths), 1992
- Zgodbice za matematiko 2 (Stories With Maths 2), 1993
- Večje-manjše (Bigger-Smaller), 1993
- Učimo se igraje (Let's Learn Through Play), 1993
- A A A abeceda (A A A Alphabet), 1993
- Štejem do 1,024 (Counting to Ten), 1993
- Besedne zmešnjave 1,2,3,4 (Word Conundrums 1,2,3,4), 1994
- Mala pošast Mici (Mici, the Little Terror), 1994
- Mici v mestu (Mici in Town), 1996
- Ta knjiga ne grize (This Book Doesn't Bite), 1997
- Pikapolonica na prašni cesti (The Ladybird on the Dusty Road), 1997
- Pošasti (Terrors), 1998
- Metulj na dežju (The Butterfly in the Rain), 2002
- Teta kuha (Aunty Cooks), 2003
- Župcin dnevnik (Župca's Diary), 2004
- Zgodbe zajca Zlatka (Tales of Zlatko the Rabbit), 2006
- Eva in kozel (Eva and the Goat), 2006
- Tia (Tia), 2007
- Še zgodbe zajca Z. (More Tales of Rabbit Z), 2007
- Lojza iz vesolja (Lojza from Space), 2008
- Julija je zaljubljena lol (Julia is in Love Lol), 2008
- Mici iz 2.a (Mici from Class 2A), 2009
- Maj za vedno :) (May Forever :)), 2009
- Bert, grad in domača naloga (Bert, the Castle and Homework), 2009
- Medved in miška 1 (The Bear and the Mouse 1), 2010
- Mihec (Little Miha), 2011
