= Marija Vojskovič =

- Born: 25 October 1915; Ljubljana, Austria-Hungary (now in Slovenia)
- Died: 1997 (aged 81–82); Maribor, Slovenia
- Occupation: Children's fiction writer
- Writing career
- Notable work: Hiša številka 15
- Notable awards: Levstik Award; 1989 for Hiša številka 15

Marija Vojskovič (25 October 1915 – 1997) was a Slovene writer, best known for her short stories and semi-autobiographical writing.

Vojskovič was born in Ljubljana in 1915. Her family had just moved there from Trieste after the outbreak of the First World War. She wrote short stories and articles published in numerous journals and magazines.

She won the Levstik Award for her book Hiša številka 15 (House Number 15) in 1989.

== Published works ==
- Tržačani (People from Trieste), 1986
- Mi smo od tam … (We Come From There ...), 1986
- Hiša št. 15 (House Number 15), 1988
- Ženski zaliv (Women's Bay), 1992
- Ljubi znanci (Dear Aquantances), 1995
- V volčji koži (In the Wolf's Skin), 1997
- Ajčkin čas (Ajčka's Time), 1997 posthumously
