= Nikolaj Omersa =

Painter and illustrator

- Born: 3 December 1911; Idrija, Slovenia
- Died: 3 December 1981 (aged 70); Ljubljana, Slovenia
- Education: Academy of Fine Arts, Zagreb
- Known for: painting and illustrating
- Notable work: Painting and illustration
- Awards: Levstik Award; 1950 for Zgodbe o živalih Levstik Award; 1955 for Zajčkov zvonček Levstik Award; 1959 for Skrivnostni jezdec and Pisani svet and Pogumni kapitani Prešeren Foundation Award; 1969 for his exhibition in Nova Gorica; Prešeren Award; 1978 for his artwork

Nikolaj Omersa (3 December 1911 – 3 December 1981) was a Slovene painter and illustrator.

== Biography ==
Omersa was born in Idrija in 1911. He graduated from the Zagreb Academy of Fine Arts in 1937. During the Second World War he was interred in Dachau Mittelbau-Dora and Ravensbrück concentration camps. After the war he taught in Ljubljana and was professor at the Academy of Fine Arts and Design from 1954 to 1973.

He received the Prešeren Foundation Award in 1969 for an exhibition of his work in Nova Gorica the previous year, and the Grand Prešeren Award in 1978 for his lifetime achievement.

He also won the Levstik Award for his illustrations three times: in 1950 for his illustrations of Milan Šega's collection of stories Zgodbe o živalih (Stories about Animals), in 1955 for his illustrations of a Hungarian folk tale Zajčkov zvonček (Bunny's Bell) and in 1959 for three books - Skrivnostni jezdec (The Mysterious Rider) by Zane Grey, Pisani svet (Colourful World) by France Bevk and Pogumni kapitani (Captains Courageous) by Rudyard Kipling.
