= Janez Kajzer =

Slovene writer (1938–2026)

- Born: 21 January 1938; Vižmarje, Kingdom of Yugoslavia (now in Slovenia)
- Died: 13 August 2026 (aged 88)
- Occupations: Writer, journalist, translator, editor
- Writing career
- Notable works: Mimo dnevnega načrta, Macesen: Roman o Ivanu Groharju,
- Notable awards: Levstik Award; 1960 for Mimo dnevnega načrta

Janez Kajzer (21 January 1938 – 13 August 2026) was a Slovene writer, journalist, translator and editor.

== Life and career ==
Kajzer was born in Vižmarje, Ljubljana on 21 January 1938. After finishing secondary school, he worked as a journalist at Mladina and Delo, and later, as an editor at Borec and Prešernova Družba publishing houses. He authored a number of novels and collections of short stories.

In 1960, he won the Levstik Award for his first published work, a collection of short stories Mimo dnevnega načrta (Beyond Daily Plans).

Kajzer died on 13 August 2026, at the age of 88.

== Published works ==
- Mimo dnevnega načrta (Beyond Daily Plans), short stories, 1960
- Klub v črnem (The Club in Black), novel, 1964
- Macesen (The Larch), novel about Ivan Grohar, 1978
- Prava moška družba (Real Male Company), short stories, 1979
- Štirje srčni možje (Four Heary Men), the story of the first ascent of Triglav, 1980
- S tramovi podprto mesto (A Town Held Up By Beams), cultural-historical stories, 1983
- Obljubljeni kraj (The Promised Land), Portraits of Slovene emigrees to the US, 1984
- Samorastnik izpod Blegoša (The Self-Made Mad from Under Mount Blegoš), 1998
- Sanjska hiša (Dream House), novel, 2004
- Skrivno oko (The Hidden Eye), short stories, 2005
- Perpetuum mobile (Perpetuum mobile), short stories, 2007
- V temnih, nemirnih nočeh (In Dark Restless Nights), short stories, 2009
- Ovadba opolnoči (Midnight Charge), novel, 2011
