= Aco Mavec =

Slovene painter, best known for children's books and comics

- Born: December 8, 1929
- Died: August 17, 1982
- Education: Academy of Fine Arts, Ljubljana
- Known for: painting, illustrating, comics and caricature
- Notable work: Painting, illustration, comics and caricature
- Awards: Levstik Award; 1966 for Otok zakladov

Aco Mavec (8 December 1929 – 17 August 1982) was a Slovene painter, best known for his illustrations of children's books and comics.

He won the Levstik Award for his illustrations of Robert Louis Stevenson's Treasure Island (Otok zakladov) in 1966.

== Selected illustrated works ==
- Hotel sem prijeti sonce (I Wanted to Touch the Sun), written by Tone Partljič, 1981
- Uganke (Riddles), written by Helena Bizjak, 1980
- Stopinje po zraku in kako sta jih odkrila Naočnik in Očalnik, mojstra med detektivi (Footprints in the Air and How They Were Discovered by Specs and Goggles, Master Detectives), written by Leopold Suhodolčan, 1977
- Na večerji s krokodilom: nove detektivske mojstrovine Naočnika in Očalnika (Dinner With the Crocodile, the New Detective Adventures of Specs and Goggles, written by Leopold Suhodolčan, 1976
- Naočnik in očalnik, mojstra med detektivi (Specs and Goggles, Master Detectives), written by Leopold Suhodolčan, 1973
- Potopljeni mesec (The Sunken Moon), written by Janez Juvan, 1965
