= Marjanca Jemec Božič =

Slovene illustrator (born 1928)

- Born: September 16, 1928; Maribor, Slovenia
- Education: Academy of Fine Arts, Ljubljana
- Known for: drawing, illustrating
- Notable work: Children's books illustrations
- Awards: Levstik Award; 2003 for lifetime achievement

Marjanca Jemec Božič (born 16 September 1928) is a Slovene illustrator, best known for her children's books illustrations.

== Life and work ==
Jemec Božič was born in Maribor in 1928, but her family moved to Ljubljana soon after. She studied at the Academy of Fine Arts in Ljubljana and works as an illustrator. Her work has been published in almost every magazine and journal for children and young adults in Slovenia. She has illustrated numerous children's picture books that have also been translated and published outside Slovenia.

In 2003 she won the Levstik Award for lifetime achievement in illustration.
