= Tone Žnidaršič =

- Born: November 5, 1923; Podgorica, Slovenia
- Died: April 9, 2007 (aged 83)
- Education: Academy of Fine Arts, Ljubljana
- Known for: painting, illustrating
- Notable work: Painting, sculpture and children's books illustration
- Awards: Levstik Award; 1964 Nauk o človeku

Tone Žnidaršič (5 November 1923 – 9 April 2007) was a Slovene painter and sculptor who also illustrated children's books and textbooks.

He won the Levstik Award in 1964 for his illustrations for the primary school textbook Nauk o človeku (On the Human Body).
