= Marijan Prosen =

- Born: 13 March 1937 (age 88); Brežice, Slovenia
- Awards: Levstik Award; 1980 for Utrinki iz astronomije
- Scientific career
- Fields: astronomy

Marijan Prosen - Majo (born 13 March 1937) is a Slovene astronomer, author of numerous scientific and popular science books and articles on astronomy.

In 1980 he won the Levstik Award for his book Utrinki iz astronomije (Flashes from Astronomy).
