= France Planina =

Slovenian geographer and cartographer

- Born: 29 September 1901; Škofja Loka, Slovenia
- Died: 14 January 1992 (aged 90); Ljubljana, Slovenia
- Awards: Levstik Award; 1967 for Jugoslavija
- Scientific career
- Fields: geography

France Planina (29 September 1901 – 14 January 1992) was a Slovene geographer and cartographer.

Planina was born in Škofja Loka in 1901. He graduated from the University of Ljubljana in 1925 and taught in secondary schools in Otočac, Kranj and Ljubljana. During the Second World War he was interned in the Gonars concentration camp. After the war he continued to teach and also worked at the Natural History Museum of Slovenia. He retired in 1962. He died in Ljubljana in 1992. In 2001 a bronze bust to Planina was unveiled in Škofja Loka.

In 1967 he won the Levstik Award for his book Jugoslavija (Yugoslavia).
