= Dušan Petrič =

Slovene painter and graphic designer (1916–1964)

- Born: 1916
- Died: 1964 (aged 47–48)
- Known for: painting and illustrating
- Notable work: Painting and graphic design
- Awards: Levstik Award; 1951 for Kaj je videl Mižek Figa

Dušan Petrič (1916–1964) was a Slovene painter and graphic designer who won the Levstik Award in 1951 for his illustrations for Kaj je videl Mižek Figa (What Mižek Figa Saw). He also designed a number of political and other posters in the period immediately after the Second World War.

== Selected Illustrated Works ==
- Pazi na glavo – glava ni žoga (Look After Your Head - Your Head Isn't a Ball), written by France Bevk, 1955
- Ujka (Tootle), written by Gertrude Crampton, 1954
- Mižek Figa gre po svetu (Mižek Figa Goes Into the World), written by Janez Menart, 1953
- Kaj je videl Mižek Figa (What Mižek Figa Saw), written by Ljudmila Prunk, 1951
