= Božo Kos =

Slovene illustrator, caricaturist and comics artist

- Born: 3 November 1931; Maribor, Slovenia
- Died: 19 April 2009 (aged 77); Ljubljana, Slovenia
- Education: Faculty of Mathematics and Physics at the University of Ljubljana
- Known for: illustrating and caricature
- Notable work: Illustration, comics and caricatures
- Awards: Prešeren Foundation Award; 1966 for TV programme Živalski karneval Levstik Award; 1968 for Veliki in mali kapitan and Kavboj Pipec in Rdeča pesa Levstik Award; 1972 for Rodiš se samo enkrat

Božo Kos (3 November 1931 – 19 April 2009) was a Slovene illustrator, caricaturist and comics artist. He illustrated over forty children's books and his illustrations appeared in numerous magazines for children and adults.

== Biography ==
Kos was born in Maribor.

He studied physics at the Faculty of Mathematics and Physics at the University of Ljubljana and in order to support himself financially during his studies, he found a job as a cartoonist for the satirical journal Pavliha and the newspaper Večer.

After completing his studies he became a free-lance artist. He was also editor of Pavliha and the children's magazine Ciciban. He also collaborated with the national broadcasting house and for his illustrations for the television programme Živalski karneval received the Prešeren Foundation Award in 1966.

He also won the Levstik Award for his book illustrations twice. In 1968 it was bestowed for two books, Veliki in mali kapitan and Kavboj Pipec in Rdeča pesa (Captain Big and Captain Little and Pipec the Cowboy and Red Beat), the latter being one of his best known works with highly recognizable characters that even appeared on stamps issued by the Slovenian Post Office in 2001. In 1972 he won the award for his illustrations in Branka Jurca's book Rodiš se samo enkrat (You Are Only Born Once).
