= Mate Dolenc =

Slovene writer and translator

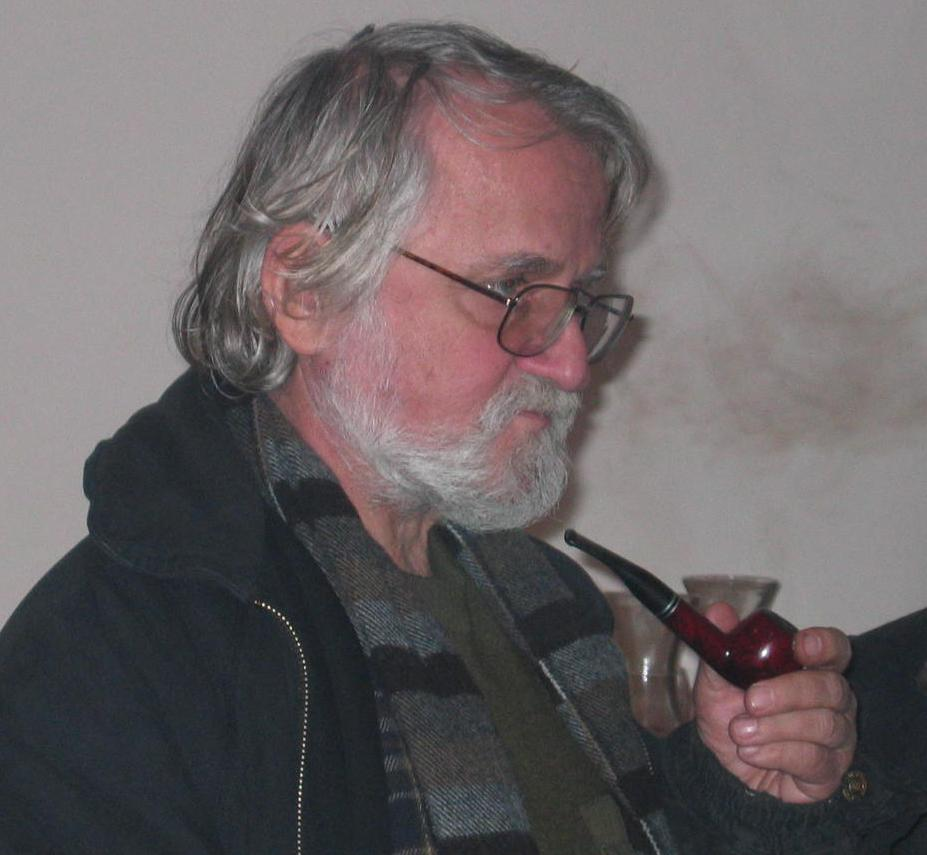
- Born: 5 October 1945 (age 80); Ljubljana, Socialist Federal Republic of Yugoslavia (now in Slovenia)
- Occupations: Writer and translator
- Writing career
- Notable works: Morska dežela na železniški postaji, Pes z Atlantide, Rum in šah, Leteča ladja, Maščevanje male ostrige
- Notable awards: Levstik Award; 1986 for Morska dežela na železniški postaji Prešeren Foundation Award; 1995 for Pes z Atlantide and Rum in šah

Mate Dolenc (born 5 October 1945) is a Slovene writer and translator. He writes novels, collections of short stories, children's books, travelogues and articles.

Dolenc was born in Ljubljana in 1945. He started studying comparative literature at the University of Ljubljana but never completed his studies. He worked at Mladina for a few years in the early 1970s. Since 1973 he works as a free-lance writer. He has written over thirty books, several screenplays and numerous articles. He is also known for his juvenile fiction. His passion for scuba diving is often reflected in the subject matter he chooses for his writing. The Adriatic and its islands have marked many of his books both for adult and young readers. In 2008 his two most successful novels The Gorjanci Vampire and The Sea at the Time of the Eclipse were made into feature films.

In 1986 he won the Levstik Award for his novel for young readers Morska dežela na železniški postaji (The Land of Sea at the Railway Station). In 1995 he won the Prešeren Foundation Award for his novel Pes z Atlantide (The Dog from Atlantis) and his collection of short stories Rum in šah (Rum and Chess).

== Published works ==
- Menjalnica (The Exchange), short stories, 1970
- Peto nadstropje trinadstropne hiše (The Fifth Floor of a Three-Storey House), satirical novel, co-authored with Dimitrij Rupel, 1972
- Aleluja Katmandu (Hallelujah Katmandu), novel, 1973
- Razkošje v glavi (Luxury in the Mind), satire, co-authored with Slavko Pregl, 1974
- Nenavadna Slovenija (Unusual Slovenia), satire, co-authored with Slavko Pregl, 1974
- Potopljeni otok (The Sunken Island), short stories, 1976
- Vampir z Gorjancev (The Gorjanci Vampire), novel, 1979, 2004
- Gorenčev vrag (Gorenc's Devil), short stories, 1977
- Vloga mojih škornjev v angolski revoluciji (The Role of My Boots in the Angolan Revolution), short stories, 1985
- Morska dežela na železniški postaji (The Land of Sea at the Railway Station), youth literature, 1986
- Velika ptičja zadeva (A Great Matter for Birds), youth literature, 1987
- Praznik republike ali abrakadabra (Republic Day or Abracadabra), short stories, 1987
- Golo morje (The Bare Sea), youth literature, 1988
- Strupena Brigita (Poisonous Bridget), youth literature, 1989
- Njen modri dežni plašč (Her Blue Rain Coat), novel, 1990
- Podmorski svet in mi (The Deapths of the Sea and Us), diving manual, 1991
- Pes z Atlantide (The Dog from Atlantis), novel, 1993
- Rum in šah (Rum and Chess), short stories, 1993
- Ozvezdje Jadran (The Adriatic Constellation), 1998
- Z masko v podvodni svet (Into the Depth with a Diving Mask), educational picture book, 1999
- Morje v času mrka (The Sea at the Time of the Eclipse), novel, 2000
- Leteča ladja (The Flying Boat), youth literature, 2002
- Morski portreti (Portraits of the Sea), educational, 2003
- Potapljanje Na Vdih & Podvodni Ribolov (Free Diving and Underwater Fishing), manual, 2004
- Morsko dno pripoveduje (The Seabed Tells), youth literature, 2004
- Golo morje (The Bare Sea), youth literature, 2005
- Kako dolg je čas (how long is time), short stories, 2019
