= Dušan Muc =

Slovene painter, illustrator and costume designer

- Born: 1952 (age 73–74); Ljubljana, Slovenia
- Education: Academy of Applied Arts, Belgrade
- Known for: Illustrating, painting and graphic design
- Notable work: Books illustrations
- Awards: Levstik Award; 1991 for Kronika ljubezenskih pripetljajev Hinko Smrekar Award; 1995 The Smrekar Award for best illustration International Golden Pen of Belgrade; 1996; Majski salon Honorary Award; 2007

Dušan Muc (born 1952) is a Slovene painter, illustrator and costume designer. He is known for his illustrations for books for children and teenagers.

== Life and career ==
Muc was born in Ljubljana in 1952. He graduated from the Academy of Applied Arts in Belgrade in 1975 and has since worked as a costume designer, art teacher and illustrator.

He won the Levstik Award in 1991 for his illustrations in Kronika ljubezenskih pripetljajev (A Chronicle of Amorous Incidents).

== Selected works ==
- Dirin, dirin, duka (Dirin, Dirin, Duka ), children's songs from White Carniola, 2009
- Široko morje, beli breg (Wide Sea, White coast), tales from around the Mediterranean, 2009
- Ko snežna sova zacinglja (When the Snowy Owl Tinkles), written by Andrej Rozman - Roza, 2008
- Koncert (The Concert), written by Tone Pavček, 2005
- Pravljica o zlatem petelinčku (The Tale of the Golden Cockerel), written by Alexander Pushkin, 1997
- Kdo (Who), written by Neža Maurer, 1997
- Kronika ljubezenskih pripetljajev (A Chronicle of Amorous Incidents), written by Tadeusz Konwicki, 1990
- Temne mitne, svetle parne (Around Christmas Nights Dark, Hay-shed Light), proverbs from Carinthia, 2012
- Pirta, farca, fidinja, tales from Bovško, 2013
- Preprosto zeleno (Simply Green), text by Evelina Umek, 2014
