= Dušan Savnik =

- Born: 1919
- Died: 1975 (aged 55–56)
- Awards: Levstik Award; 1958 for Svet nasprotij

Dušan Savnik (1919–1975) was a Slovene lawyer, journalist and translator.

Savnik wrote a number of non-fiction books on geographical, historical and political aspects of various parts of the world including Latin America in Svet nasprotij (A World of Opposites), 1958, Africa in Afrika včeraj in danes (Africa Yesterday and Today), 1960, and Oceania in Oceanija v sodobnem svetu (Oceania in the Modern World), 1964.

He also translated into Slovene books such as Michihiko Hachiya's Hiroshima Diary (Slovene title: Hirošima: zdravnikov dnevnik), 1958, Anton Zischka's Asiens wilder Westen (Slovene title: Azijski divji zapad: Spremembe v Zahodni Kitajski, Tibetu, Mongoliji in Sibiriji), 1960 and Richard Wright's Black Power (Slovene title: Črna sila), 1960.

He won the Levstik Award in 1958 for Svet nasprotij (A World of Opposites), a look at twenty countries of Latin America.
