= Jože Pahor =

Slovene writer, playwright, editor and journalist

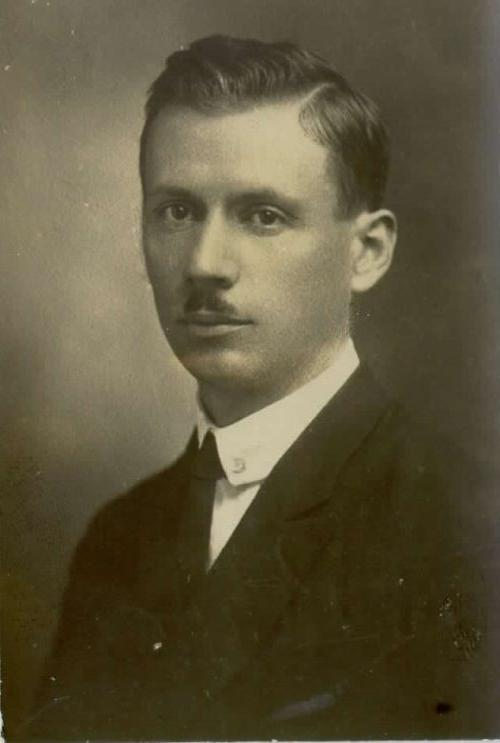
- Born: 20 February 1888; Sežana, Austria-Hungary (now Slovenia)
- Died: 1 September 1964 (aged 76); Ljubljana, Slovenia
- Occupations: writer, playwright, editor and journalist
- Writing career
- Notable awards: Levstik Award; 1951 for Hodil po zemlji sem naši

Jože Pahor (20 February 1888 – 1 September 1964) was a Slovene writer, playwright, editor and journalist.

In 1951 he won the Levstik Award for his travel journal around Yugoslavia entitled Hodil po zemlji sem naši (I Walked Our Land).

== Bibliography ==
Novels

- Medvladje (Interregnum), 1923
- Serenissima (Serenissima), in the journal Ljubljanski zvon 1928–1929, as a book in 1945
- Matija Gorjan (Matija Gorjan), 1940
- Pot desetega brata (The Path of the Tenth Brother), 1951

Plays

- Viničarji (The Vinedressers), 1937, as a book 1951
- Čas je dozorel (The Time Has Come), 1953
- Semena v kamenju (Seeds in Stone), 1954

Youth literature

- Otrok črnega rodu (A Child of a Dark Race), 1937
- Tako je bilo trpljenje (That's What the Suffering Was Like), 1946
- Hodil po zemlji sem naši (I Walked Our Land), 1951
- Mladost na Krasu (Youth on the Karst Plateau), 1959
