= Neli Kodrič =

Slovene children's writer (born 1964)

- Born: 12 May 1964; Postojna, Socialist Federal Republic of Yugoslavia (now in Slovenia)
- Occupation: juvenile fiction writer
- Writing career
- Notable works: Lov na zvezde, Na drugi strani
- Notable awards: Levstik Award; 1995 for Lov na zvezde

Neli Kodrič Filipić (born 12 May 1964) is a Slovene children's writer. Her first book Lov na zvezde (Star Hunting) won her the Levstik Award and all her following books have been popular with young readers.

Kodrič was born in Postojna in 1960. She studied graphic design at the Academy of Fine Arts in Ljubljana, but works as a writer of juvenile fiction.

== Published works ==
- Lov na zvezde (Star Hunting), 1995
- TITAboginja.smole.in.težav.si (Tita - goddess of bad luck and trouble), 2002
- Na drugi strani (On the Other Side), 2004
- 49:03:39, 2008
- Sreča je (Happiness Is), 2008
- Punčka in velikan (The Girl and the Giant), 2009
- Jasmin in srečni cekin (Jasmin and the Lucky Coin), 2009
- Kaj ima ljubezen s tem (What's Love Got to Do with It), 2009
- Ali te lahko objamem močno? (Can I Hug You Hard?), 2011
