= Alenka Gerlovič =

Slovenian painter (1919–2010)

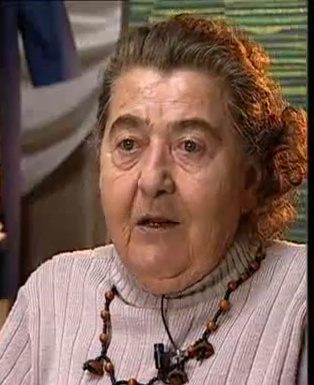
- Born: 17 September 1919; Ljubljana, Slovenia
- Died: 9 December 2010 (aged 91); Ljubljana, Slovenia
- Education: Zagreb Academy of Fine Arts
- Known for: painting
- Notable work: Painting
- Awards: Levstik Award; 1968 for Likovni pouk otrok Prešeren Foundation Award; 1981 for her artistic opus

Alenka Gerlovič (17 September 1919 – 9 December 2010) was a Slovene painter.

Gerlovič was born in Ljubljana in 1919. She studied art at the Zagreb Academy of Fine Arts. During the Second World War she joined the partisans. She died in Ljubljana in 2010.

She won the Levstik Award in 1968 for her book Likovni pouk otrok (Art Classes for Children).

She won the Prešeren Foundation Award in 1981 for her artistic achievements.
