= Miha Likar =

- Born: 24 July 1923; Ljubljana, Slovenia
- Died: 3 May 2010 (aged 86); Ljubljana, Slovenia
- Known for: Family Health: An Illustrated Guide
- Awards: Levstik Award; 1962 for Virusi, Bakterije in Glivice
- Scientific career
- Fields: medicine, microbiology

Miha Likar (24 July 1923 – 3 May 2010) was a Slovene doctor, specialist in microbiology and parasitology.

Likar was born in Ljubljana in 1923 and studied medicine at the University of Ljubljana where he later worked. He died in 2010. He was author of the internationally successful book Family Health: An Illustrated Guide (published 1980 ISBN 978-1870630283) (Slovene title: Zdravje v družini) and a number of other lay books on health and related matters. He won the Levstik Award in 1962 for Virusi, Bakterije in Glivice (Viruses, Bacteria and Fungi).
