= Janez Vidic =

Slovene painter (1923–1996)

- Born: 8 February 1923; Ljubljana, Slovenia
- Died: 19 May 1996 (aged 73)
- Education: Academy of Fine Arts, Ljubljana
- Known for: painting
- Notable work: Painting and illustration
- Awards: Levstik Award; 1950 for Premagane zverine Levstik Award; 1951 for Živalske pripovedke Levstik Award; 1952 for Letni časi Prešeren Foundation Award; 1977 for his paintings exhibited in Maribor in 1976

Janez Vidic (8 February 1923 – 19 May 1996) was a Slovene painter and illustrator, best known for his oil paintings of landscapes and people as well as his murals.

Vidic was born in Ljubljana in 1923. During the Second World War he was imprisoned in the Gonars and Renicci di Anghiari concentration camps. In 1944 he joined the Slovene Partisans. After the war he studied art at the Academy of Fine Arts, Ljubljana and graduated in 1950.

He won the Levstik Award for his book illustrations three times: in 1950 for his illustrations of Mile Klopčič's Premagane zverine (Defeated Beasts), in 1951 for his illustrations for Matija Valjavec's collection of stories Živalske pripovedke (Animal Tales) and in 1952 for the picture book Letni časi (The Seasons).

He received the Prešeren Foundation Award in 1977 for his paintings exhibited in Maribor in 1976.
