= France Forstnerič =

Slovene poet, writer and journalist

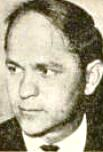
- Born: 29 January 1933; Pobrežje, Kingdom of Yugoslavia (now in Slovenia)
- Died: 22 May 2007 (aged 74); Maribor, Slovenia
- Occupations: poet, writer and journalist
- Writing career
- Notable works: Pijani kurent, Srakač
- Notable awards: Levstik Award; 1970 Srakač; Prešeren Foundation Award; 1972 Pijani kurent

France Forstnerič (29 January 1933 – 22 May 2007) was a Slovene poet, writer, and journalist.

Forstnerič was born in Pobrežje near Ptuj in 1933. He trained as a teacher and taught for a number of years before becoming a journalist in 1958. He worked for the newspapers Večer and Delo and also obtained a degree in sociology from the University of Ljubljana in 1979. He wrote for adults and children. He is best known for his poetry that he started publishing in the early 1960s. In 1970 he won the Levstik Award for his book Srakač. In 1972 he won the Prešeren Foundation Award for his collection of poems entitled Pijani kurent (The Drunken Kurent).

== Published works ==
Poetry collections

- Zelena ječa (The Green Jail), 1961
- Dolgo poletje (The Long Summer), 1968
- Pijani kurent (The Drunken Kurent), 1971
- Pesniški list 32 (The Poet's List 32), 1976
- Izbor Pesmi (Collected Poems), 1979
- Ljubstava, 1981
- Drava življenja (The River Drava of Life), 1993

Prose

- Jabolko (The Apple), 1979
- Brlog (The Den), short stories, 1987

For Young Readers

- Srakač, 1970
- Bela murva (The White Mulberry), poems, 1976
