= Janez Matjašič =

Slovenian zoologist

- Born: 14 May 1921; Ljubljana, Slovenia
- Died: 9 August 1996 (aged 75)
- Known for: speleobiology
- Awards: Levstik Award; 1956 for Iz življenja najmanjših
- Scientific career
- Fields: zoology

Janez Matjašič (14 May 1921 – 9 August 1996) was a Slovene zoologist.

Matjašič was an associate member of the Slovenian Academy of Sciences and Arts from 1974 and a full member from 1989.

Apart from scientific contributions he also wrote two popular science books Nevidno življenje (Invisible Life) and Iz življenja najmanjših (From the Lives of the Smallest). For the latter he won the Levstik Award in 1956.
