= Jelka Godec Schmidt =

- Born: 1 May 1958; Ljubljana, Slovenia
- Education: Academy of Fine Arts, Ljubljana
- Known for: illustrating, writing children's books
- Notable work: Children's books writing and illustration
- Awards: Levstik Award; 1997 Bisernica: slovenske kratke pripovedi za otroke

Jelka Godec Schmidt (born 1 May 1958) is a Slovene illustrator and writer of children's books.

== Life and work ==
Godec was born in Ljubljana in 1958. She graduated from the Academy of Fine Arts in Ljubljana and has since worked as a free-lance artist. She has illustrated over 40 books and her illustrations also appear in magazines for children. Her mother Ančka Gošnik Godec is also an illustrator, as was her husband Matjaž Schmidt.

She won the Levstik Award in 1997 for her illustrations of Bisernica: slovenske kratke pripovedi za otroke (Bisernica: Traditional Short Stories for Children).

== Selected illustrated works ==
- Zgodba o volku in lisici (The Tale of the Wolf and the Fox), written by Mojiceja Podgoršek, 2009
- Najlepše pravljice 2 (Most Beautiful Fairy Tales 2), 2009
- Zobek Mlečko pri zobozdravniku (Milky the Tooth at the Dentist's), written by Helena Koncut Kraljič, 2009
- O štirih prijatejih (About Four Friends), written by Mojiceja Podgoršek, 2009
- Janko in Metka in druge pravljice (Hansel and Gretel and Other Fairy Tales), written by Brothers Grimm, 2009
- Mizica, pogrni se in druge pravljice (The Wishing-Table and Other Tales), written by Brothers Grimm, 2009
- Mavrične kraljične (The Rainbow Princesses), written by Helena Koncut Kraljič, 2007
- Škrat Zguba in kameleon 3 (Goblin Looser and Cameleon 3), author and illustrator, 2006
- Najdihojca, written by Fran Levstik, 2005
