= Božo Škerlj =

- Born: 28 September 1904; Vienna, Austria
- Died: 10 November 1961 (aged 53); Ljubljana, Slovenia
- Awards: Levstik Award; 1955 for Neznana Amarika
- Scientific career
- Fields: anthropology

Božo Škerlj (28 September 1908 – 10 November 1961) was a Slovene anthropologist, author of eleven books and over 200 scientific articles published in journals at home and abroad.

Škerlj was born in Vienna in 1908. He studied biology and geography at the University of Ljubljana and graduated in 1926. He then specialized in Prague and Brno and later in Germany and Norway. In 1944 he was interred in Dachau concentration camp and after the end of the Second World War became professor at the University in Ljubljana. He died in 1961 in Ljubljana.

He won the Levstik Award in 1955 for his travelogue Neznana Amerika (Unknown America).

== Selected published works ==
- Razvoj živega sveta (The Development of Life), with Jovan Hadži and Anton Polenec, 1947
- Splošna antropologija v osnovnih potezah (General Anthropology in Basic Terms), 1948
- Razvoj človeka (antropogeneza) (The Development of Man (Anthropogeny)), 1950
- Neznana Amerika (Unknown America), 1952
- Ljudstva brez kovin (Peoples Without Metal), 1962
- Palme, piramide in puščave (Palms, Pyramids and Deserts), 1956
- Misleči dvonožec (The Thinking Biped), 1963
