= Božo Petek =

- Known for: books on model aircraft building
- Awards: Levstik Award; 1954 for Letalsko modelarstvo: motorni modeli

Božo Petek was the author of two books on model aircraft building published in Slovene in 1946 and 1953.

In 1954 he won the Levstik Award for Letalsko modelarstvo: motorni modeli (Model Aircraft Building: Motor Planes).

== Published works ==
- Letalsko modelarstvo: jadralni modeli (Model Aircraft Building: Gliders), 1946
- Vazduhoplovno modelarstvo (his 1946 book translated into Serbo-Croatian), 1948
- Letalsko modelarstvo: motorni modeli (Model Aircraft Building: Motor Planes), 1953
