= Samo Kuščer =

Slovene physicist and writer (born 1952)

- Born: 1952 (age 73–74)
- Occupations: Physicist and writer
- Writing career
- Notable awards: Levstik Award; 1987 for Logo in računalnik Levstik Award; 1993 for Energija

Samo Kuščer (born 1952) is a Slovene physicist and writer.

He won the Levstik Award twice for his popular science books, in 1987 Logo in računalnik (Logo and Computers) and in 1993 for Energija (Energy). He is also known for his science fiction stories.

== Selected works ==
- Zrak (Air), 2000
- Voda (Water), 1997
- Brbi gre po barve (Brbi Gets Some Colours), 1994
- Živa zemlja (Living Earth), 1994
- Energija (Energy), 1991
- Logo in računalnik (Logo and Computers), 1987
- Moj prijatelj računalnik (My Friend the Computer), 1985
- Sabi (Sabi), short SF stories, 1983
- Žalostni virtuoz (Melancholy Virtuoso), short SF stories, 1989
