= Polonca Kovač =

Slovene children's writer and translator

- Born: 19 February 1937; Ljubljana, Kingdom of Yugoslavia (now in Slovenia)
- Occupations: writer and translator
- Writing career
- Notable works: Zverinice z Večne poti, Kaja in njena družina
- Notable awards: Levstik Award; 2009 for lifetime achievement

Polonca Kovač, true name Magdalena Kovač, (born 19 February 1937) is a Slovene children's writer and translator. She has published numerous children's books and is also known for her translations for young readers, most notably the entire collection of Grimms' Fairy Tales and The Diary of Anne Frank.

Kovač was born in Ljubljana in 1937. She studied Comparative literature at the University of Ljubljana and worked as a teacher and a free-lance writer. She started publishing children's books in 1975 and has written a large numbers of books with a broad range of themes and styles.

== Awards and honours ==
In 2009 she received the Levstik Award for her lifetime achievement in children's literature.

== Published works ==
- Zverinice z Večne poti (Little Beasts from the Eternal Road), 1975
- Klepetava želva (The Chatty Tortoise), 1975
- Jakec in stric hladilnik (Jakec and Uncle Rerigerator), 1976
- Andrejev ni nikoli preveč (There is Never Too Many Andrews), 1977
- Stric hladilnik, boben sreče in kanarček (Uncle Refrigerator, the Drum of Luck and the Canary), 1978
- Deževen dan je krasen dan (A Rainy Day is a Wonderful Day), 1979
- Slovarček tujk (A Dictionary of Borrowed Words), 1980
- Urške so brez napake (Ursulas are Flawless), 1980
- Igrice za kartek čas (Games to Pass Your Time), 1982
- Pet kužkov išče pravega (Five Puppies Looking for the Right One), 1982
- Zgodbe od A do Ž (Stories from A to Z), 1982
- Kresnica podnevnica (The Daylight Firefly), 1983
- Špelce (Little Špelas), 1983
- Vesoljsko jajce ali 1+1=5 (The Space Egg or 1+1=5), 1985
- Težave in sporočila psička Pafija (The Troubles and Messages of Paffy the Dog), 1986
- Mufijeve sanje (Muffy's Dreams), 1987
- Mišek (The Little Mouse), 1989
- O dveh občutljivkah (On Two Sensitive Girls), 1989
- O krokodilih, putkah in miselnih igrah (On Crocodiles, Chickens and Thinking Games), 1989
- Kaj se komu sanja (Anyone Have a Clue), 1990
- V mestu (In Town), 1991
- Zelišča male čarovnice (The Young Witche's Herbs), 1995
- Palčki na Smovskem Griču (Dwarfs on Smov Hill), 1996
- Od kod so se vzele pravljice (Where Do Stories Come From), 1998
- Kaja in njena družina (Kaja and Her Family), 1999
- Mali medo (Little Teddy), 2000
- S pravljico na izlet (An Outing With a Story), 2001
- Ptičje leto (The Year of Birds), 2005
