= Luc Menaše =

Slovenian art historian

- Born: 3 April 1925; Šentlambert, Slovenia
- Died: 2 July 2002 (aged 77)
- Occupation: art historian
- Awards: Levstik Award; 1971 for Evropski umetnostnozgodovinski leksikon

Luc Menaše (3 April 1925 - 2 July 2002) was a Slovene art historian and prolific author of books on art history.

He won the Levstik Award in 1971 for his book Evropski umetnostnozgodovinski leksikon (European Art Historical Dictionary).

== Selected published works ==
- Muzej likovnih umjetnosti, Budimpešta (Museum of Fine Arts Budapest), 1983
- Umetniki in spremljevalci: Slovensko umetnostno življenje 20. stoletja v ogledalu portretov in portretnih karikatur (Artists and Their Company: Slovene Artistic Scene of the 20th Century Through Portraits and Caricatures), 1981
- Znameniti ljudje na znamkah (Famous People on Stamps), 1978
- Ivana Kobilca (Ivana Kobilca), 1972
- Evropski umetnostno-zgodovinski lesikon (European Art Historical Dictionary), 1971
- Zahodnoevropski slikani portret (Portrait Painting in Western Europe), 1962
- Gabrijel Stupica (Gabrijel Stupica), 1959
- Avtoportret na Slovenskem (The Self Portrait in Slovenia), 1958
