= Mojca Osojnik =

Slovene painter and illustrator (born 1970)

- Born: June 29, 1970 (age 56); Kranj, Slovenia
- Education: Academy of Fine Arts, Ljubljana
- Known for: painting, illustrating, children's books
- Notable work: Children's books illustrations
- Awards: Levstik Award; 2003 for Hiša, ki bi rada imela sonce

Mojca Osojnik (born 29 June 1970) is a Slovene painter and illustrator, best known for her children's books illustrations.

== Life and work ==
Osojnik was born in Kranj in 1970. She graduated from the Academy of Fine Arts in Ljubljana in 1997 and obtained her Master's degree in 2001. From 2001 to 2003 she lived and worked in Los Alamos. She has participated in numerous art exhibitions in Slovenia and abroad. She also works as a children's book illustrator, some of which she has also written herself.

In 2003 she won the Levstik Award for her book Hiša, ki bi rada imela sonce (The House That Wanted to Be in the Sun).

== Published works ==
=== Author and illustrator ===
- To je Ernest (This Is Ernest), 1997
- Hiša, ki bi rada imela sonce (The House That Wanted to Be in the Sun), 2001
- Polž Vladimir gre na štop (Vladimir the Snail Goes Hitchhiking), 2003
- Kako je gnezdila sraka Sofija (How Sofia the Magpie Made Her Nest), 2005

=== Illustrator ===
- Koroške ljudske pravljice in pripovedke (Carinthian Folk Tales and Fables) by Vinko Möderndorfer, 1992
- Moji pridni otroci (My Good Children) by Sonja Wakounig, 1992
- O mrožku, ki si ni hotel striči nohtov (About Little Walrus Who Didn't Want to Cut His Nails) by Peter Svetina, 1999
- Čas je velika smetanova torta (Time Is a Big Chocolate Cake) by Miha Mazzini, 1999
- Mrožek dobi očala (Little Walrus' New Glasses) by Peter Svetina, 2003
