= Kamila Volčanšek =

Slovene painter and illustrator

- Born: 19 March 1950 (age 76); Brežice, Slovenia
- Education: Academy of Fine Arts, Ljubljana
- Known for: painting, illustrating
- Notable work: Children's books illustration and painting
- Awards: Levstik Award; 1981 Kralj Drozgobrad

Kamila Volčanšek (born 19 March 1950) is a Slovene painter and illustrator of children's books.

== Life and work ==
Volčanšek was born in Brežice in 1950. She graduated from the Academy of Fine Arts in Ljubljana in 1978.

She has illustrated numerous children's books and won the Levstik Award in 1981 for her illustrations for the book Kralj Drozgobrad (King Thrushbeard) by the Brothers Grimm.

== Selected illustrated works ==
- Pogašeni zmaj (The Extinguished Dragon), written by Bina Štampe Žmavc, 2003
- Bohinjske pravljice (Fairy Tales from Bohinj), 1999
- Denar naredi vse (Money Can Do Everything), written by Italo Calvino, 1995
- Janko in Metka (Hansel and Gretel), written by Brothers Grimm, 1994
- Deklica lastovica (The Swallow Girl), Slovene folk tale, 1989
- Turjaška Rozamunda(Rosamund of Turjak Castle), written by France Prešeren, 1985
- Stara Ljubljana (Old Ljubljana), written by Niko Grafenauer, 1983
- Cesarjev slavec (The Nightingale), written by Hans Christian Andersen, 1981
- Kralj Drozgobrad (King Thrushbeard), written by Brothers Grimm, 1980
