= Rado Krošelj =

- Born: 1915
- Known for: illustrating
- Notable work: Illustration and graphic design
- Awards: Levstik Award; 1952 for Barčica

Rado Krošelj (born 1915, date of death unknown) was a Slovene illustrator and graphic designer who won the Levstik Award in 1952 for his illustrations of the book of poems for children Barčica (The Little Boat) selected and translated by Alojz Gradnik. He was also the author of numerous political and other posters in the period immediately after the Second World War.

== Selected illustrated works ==
- Kavkaške pravljice (Tales from the Caucasus), written based on traditional tales by France Bevk, 1954
- Barčica (The Little Boat), children's poems selected and translated by Alojz Gradnik, 1952
- Liščki (Goldfinches), written by Tone Seliškar, 1950
- Pregnancy (Exiles), written by Adam Milkovič, 1948
