= Drago Matanović =

- Known for: A number of books and textbooks on electrical engineering published from the 1930s to the 1950s
- Awards: Levstik Award; 1951 for Pogled v elektrotehniko

Drago Matanović was the author of numerous books and textbooks on electrical engineering published in Slovene from the 1930s to the 1950s.

In 1951 he won the Levstik Award for his book Pogled v elektrotehniko (A Look at Electrotechnics).

== Published works ==
- Elektrotehnika (Electrotechnics), 1933
- K vprašanju gospodarske razsvetljave (On the Question of Economical Lighting), 1935
- O ceni električne energije s posebnim ozirom na razsvetljavo (On the Price of Electricity Particularly in Respect to Lighting), 1944
- Od elektrarne do žarnice: čitanka o elektrotehniki za mlade in stare (From the Power Plant to the Light Bulb: A Textbook on Electrotechins for Young and Old), 1949
- Splošna elektrotehnika: I del: Osnove (General Electrotechnics: Volume I: The Basics), 1950
- Pogled v elektrotehniko (A Look at Electrotechnics), 1951
- Zaščitne mere v električnih napravah (Protective Measures in Electrical Appliances), 1951
- Splošna elektrotehnika: II del: Stroji in meritve (General Electrotechnics: Volume II: Equipment and Measurements), 1952
