= Gvido Birolla =

Slovene painter

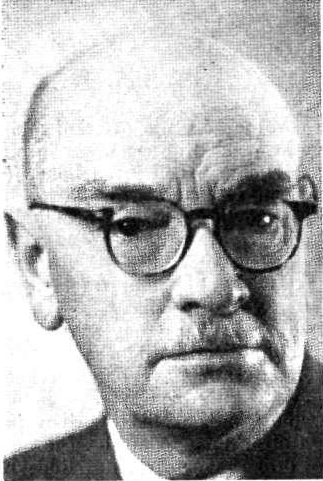
- Born: 12 June 1881; Trieste, Italy
- Died: 29 May 1963 (aged 81); Ljubljana, Slovenia
- Education: Academy of Fine Arts Vienna
- Known for: painting, illustrating
- Notable work: Painting, illustration and caricature
- Awards: Levstik Award; 1951 for Trije bratje in trije razbojniki

Gvido Birolla (12 June 1881 – 29 May 1963) was a Slovene painter, illustrator and caricaturist, known for his political caricatures published in satirical newspapers of the time and his book illustrations.

== Biography ==
Birolla was born in Trieste in 1881. His father was an Italian from Pazin and his mother a Slovene from Škofja Loka. After his father's death in 1884, his mother moved back to Škofja Loka where Gvido grew up. He studied in Ljubljana and later at the Academy of Fine Arts in Vienna.

He died in Ljubljana in 1963.

Birolla was a very popular book illustrator and won the Levstik Award for his illustrations of Karel Širok's book Trije bratje in trije razbojniki (Three Brothers and Three Robbers).

== Selected illustrated works ==
- Leta moje mladosti (The Years of My Youth), written by Fran Saleški Finžgar, 1967 (illustrated together with Ive Šubic
- Jurij Kozjak, slovenski janičar (Jurij Kozjak, the Slovene Janissary), written by Josip Jurčič, 1963
- Repoštev, gospodar krkonošev, written by Johann Karl August Musäus, 1957
- Škorenjček Matevžek (Matevžek the Little Boot), written by Saša Vuga, 1955
- Brezen (The Abyss), written by Andrej Šavli, 1955
- Trije bratje in trije razbojniki (Three Brothers and Three Robbers), written by Karel Širok, 1951
- Triglav: planinska idila (Triglav: A Mountain Idyll), written by Fran Saleški Finžgar, 1950
- Oljki (To the Olive Tree), written by Simon Gregorčič, 1944
- Mlada pota (Paths of Youth), written by Oton Župančič, 1921
