= Ela Peroci =

Slovene writer, journalist (1922–2001)

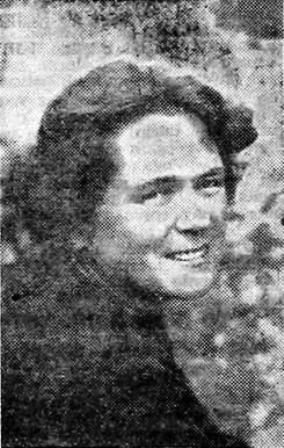
- Born: 11 February 1922; Sveti Križ pri Rogaški Slatini, Kingdom of Serbs, Croats and Slovenes (now in Slovenia)
- Died: 18 November 2001 (aged 79); Ljubljana, Slovenia
- Occupations: Writer; teacher; journalist
- Writing career
- Notable works: Muca Copatarica, Moj dežnik je lahko balon, Tisočkratlepa, Na oni strani srebrne črte
- Notable awards: Levstik Award; 1955 for Moj dežnik je lahko balon Levstik Award; 1956 for Tisočkratlepa; Prešeren Foundation Award; 1971 for Na oni strani srebrne črte

Ela Peroci (11 February 1922 – 18 November 2001) was a Slovene children's writer, author of numerous children's stories that are considered classics in Slovene children's literature. Her best known story is Muca Copatarica (Slipper Keeper Kitty), illustrated by Ančka Gošnik Godec, which has seen numerous reprints and has sold over 140,000 copies.

Peroci was born in Sveti Križ pri Rogaški Slatini in 1922. She trained as a teacher and started teaching in 1945. In 1948, she started working as a journalist for children's publications such as Pionir, Ciciban and Mladi Svet. She graduated from the University of Ljubljana in 1954 and then worked at the national radio broadcaster until her retirement in 1978. She wrote short stories for children but also published two poetry collections for adults. She died in Ljubljana in 2001.

She won the Levstik Award twice, in 1955 for Moj dežnik je lahko balon (My Umbrella Can Turn into a Balloon) and in 1956 for Tisočkratlepa (Thousandbeauty). In 1971 she won the Prešeren Foundation Award for her collection of stories Na oni strani srebrne črte (Beyond the Silver Line).

== Bibliography ==
=== Picture books ===
- Moj dežnik je lahko balon (My Umbrella Can Turn into a Balloon), 1955
- Tisočkratlepa (Thousandbeauty), 1956
- Majhno kot mezinec (Small As the Thumb), 1957
- Muca Copatarica (Slipper Keeper Kitty), 1957
- Kje so stezice? (Where Are the Paths?), 1960
- Zato, ker je na nebu oblak (Because There is A Cloud in the Sky), 1963
- Hišica iz kock (House of Blocks), 1964
- Kozliček Goliček (Goliček the Goat), 1964
- Bomo šli s sanmi po snegu in spustili se po bregu (We Shall Take Our Sleigh and Sledge Down the Hill), 1965
- Vozimo, vozimo vlak (We Drive, We Drive A Train), 1965
- Čebelice (Bees), 1966
- Klobuček, petelin in roža (The Little Hat, the Cockrel and the Flower), 1968
- Pravljice žive v velikem starem mestu (Live Stories in the Big Old Town), 1969
- Stara hiša št. 3 (The Old House At No.3.), 1973
- Lalala (Lalala), 1975
- Modri zajec (The Blue Rabbit), 1975
- Nina v čudežni deželi (Nina In The Strange Land), 1985
- Telefon (The Telephone), 1987
- Amalija in Amalija (Amalia and Amalia), 1998

=== Stories ===
- Tacek (Tacek), 1959
- Za lahko noč (Good Night Stories), 1964
- Očala tete Bajavaje (Aunt Bajvaja's Glasses), 1969
- Stolp iz voščilnic (The Greeting Card Tower), 1977
- Siva miš, ti loviš (Grey Mouse, You Catch), 1983
- Mož z dežnikom (The Man With the Umbrella), 1989
- Prisedite k moji mizici (Come And Sit At My Table), 1990
- Povestice Tik-Tak (Tick-tack Tales), 1998

=== Poetry ===
- Rišem dan (I Draw the Day), 1966
- Ko živim (When I Live), 1975

=== Prose ===
- Breskve (Peaches), 1959
- Po šoli me počakaj (Wait For Me After School), 1966
- Reci sonce, reci luna (Say Sun, Say Moon), 1979
- Fantek in punčka (Boy and Girl), 1996
