= France Križanič =

Slovenian mathematician

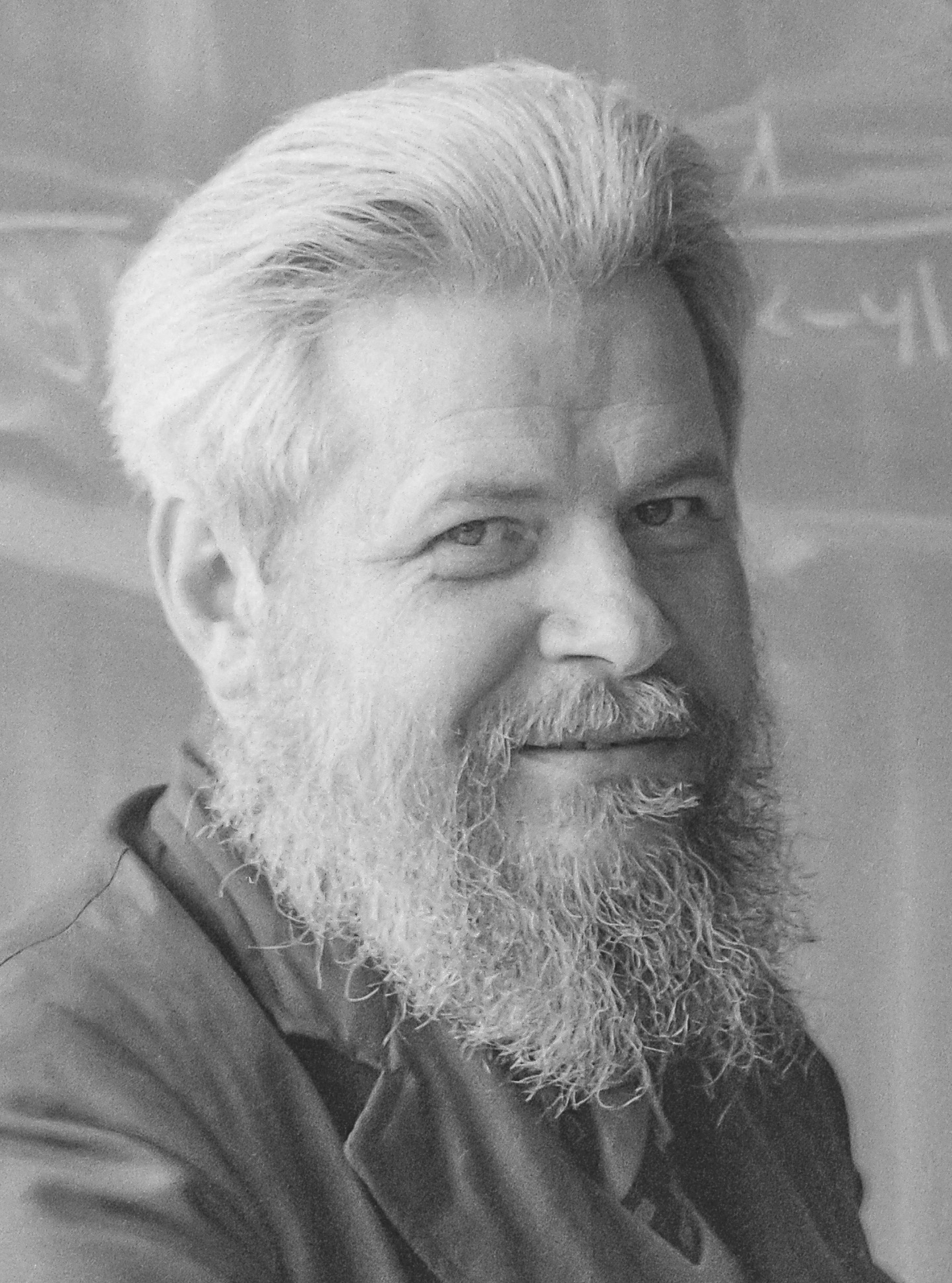
- Križanič in Ljubljana, 1979
- Born: 3 March 1928; Maribor, Kingdom of SCS
- Died: 17 January 2002 (aged 73); Ljubljana, Slovenia
- Scientific career
- Fields: Mathematics, mathematical physics

France Križanič (3 March 1928 – 17 January 2002) was a Slovene mathematician, author of numerous books and textbooks on mathematics. He was professor of mathematical analysis at the Faculty of Mathematics and Physics of the University of Ljubljana.

Križanič won the Levstik Award twice, in 1951 for his book Kratkočasna matematika (Maths for Fun) and in 1960 for Križem po matematiki and Elektronski aritmetični računalniki (Criss Cross Across Maths and Electronic Calculators).

== Published works ==
- Kratkočasna matematika (Maths for Fun), 1951
- Križem kražem po matematiki (Criss Cross Across Maths), 1960
- Elektronski aritmetični računalniki (Electronic Calculators), 1960
- Vektorji, matrike, tenzorji (Vectors, Matrices, Tensors), 1962
- Aritmetika, algebra in analiza – I.del (Arithmetics, Algebra and Analysis – Part I.), 1963
- Aritmetika, algebra in analiza – II.del (Arithmetics, Algebra and Analysis – Part II.), 1964
- Aritmetika, algebra in analiza – III.del (Arithmetics, Algebra and Analysis – Part III.), 1964
- Aritmetika, algebra in analiza – IV.del (Arithmetics, Algebra and Analysis – Part IV.), 1964
- Operatorski račun in integralske transformacije (Operational Calculus and Integral Transforms), 1965
- Vektorska in tenzorska analiza (Vector and Tensor Analysis), 1966
- Linearna algebra in linearna analiza (Linear Algebra and Linear Analysis), 1969
- Funkcije več kompleksnih spremenljivk (Functions of Complex Numbers), 1971
- Dinamični sistemi (Dynamical Systems), 1972
- Topološke grupe (Topological Groups), 1974
- Navadne diferencialne enačbe in variacijski račun (Ordinary Differential Equations and Variational Calculus), 1974
- Liejeve grupe (Lie groups), 1976
- Liejeve algebra (Lie Algebra), 1978
- Linearna algebra (Linear Algebra), 1978
- Matematika – prvo berilo (Mathematics – First Year Textbook), 1981
- Matematika – drugo berilo (Mathematics – Second Year Textbook), 1981
- Matematika – tretje berilo (Mathematics – Third Year Textbook), 1983
- Matematika – četrto berilo (Mathematics – Fourth Year Textbook), 1985
- Linearna analiza na grupah (Linear Analysis on Groups), 1982
- Nihalo, prostor in delci (The pendulum, Space and Particles), 1982
- Temelji realne matematične analize (The Foundation of Real Mathematical Analysis), 1990
- Linearna algebra in linearna analiza (Linear Algebra and Linear Analysis), 1993
- Vektorska in tenzorska analiza – abeceda globalne analize (Vector and Tensor Analysis – the Alphabet of Global Analysis), 1996
- Splošno in posebno : (nakladanja in otepanja) (General and Specific Stuff : Collection of Notes), published posthumously 2003
