= Janez Bitenc =

Slovene composer and music teacher

- Born: October 25, 1925; Ljubljana, Kingdom of Yugoslavia (now in Slovenia)
- Died: February 4, 2005 (aged 79); Ljubljana, Slovenia
- Occupations: Violinist and music teacher

Janez Bitenc (25 October 1925 – 4 February 2005) was a Slovene composer and music teacher, best known for the music he wrote for over 400 children's songs and musical stories.

Bitenc was born in Ljubljana. He studied music at the Academy of Music in Ljubljana, where he graduated in 1952. In addition to composing music, he also wrote the lyrics for many of his children's songs and published book of stories for children. In 1971, he won the Levstik Award for his book of songs for young children Ciciban poje (Ciciban Sings). He died in Ljubljana at the age of 79.

Bitenc's songs are known by more or less all preschool and primary school children in Slovenia. Among the best known of his songs are "Kuža pazi" (The Little Dog is Watching), "Naša četica koraka" (Our Little Squad is Marching), "Zajček dolgoušček" (Rabbit Long-Ears), and "Ringa raja."

== Selected Works for Children ==
- Ciciban poje (Ciciban Sings), 1971
- Sonce se smeje (The Sun Is Smiling), 1985
- Jakčev klobuček (Little Jake's Hat), 1987
- Trije petelinčki (Three Little Cockrels), 1987
- Srebrni gumbek (The Silver Button), 1987
- Leseni ptiček in druge glasbene pravljice (The Wooden Bird and Other Musical Stories), 1991
- Medvedki na semnju (Teddies at the Fair), 1993
- O zajčku, ki je izgubil ključek (The Bunny Who Lost the Key), 1993
- Oblaček Postopaček (The Wandering Little Cloud). 1995
- Zmaj Lakotaj (Lakotaj the Dragon), 1998
- Medvedka Meta, medved Jaka in čarodejno ogledalo (Meta the Bear, Jaka the Bear, and the Magic Mirror), 2001
- Božična zgodba (A Christmas Tale), 2003
- Snežinka Pepinka (Pepinka the Snowflake), 2004
- Kje je moja kapica? (Where is My Hat?) 2004
- Mucka Čiribucka (Mittypins the Kitten), 2005
- O mucki Vili, Vili Maji in povodnem možu (Vila the Kitten, Maya the Fairy, and the River Man), 2005
- O mucki Moniki in zvezdici Lučki (Monica the Cat and the Little Star Lučka), 2005
- O mucah, ki predejo sanje (Cats That Weave Dreams), 2005
- Prvi šolski dan v mačji šoli (The First Day of School at Cat School), 2005
- Mucine sanje (Kitty's Dreams), 2005
- Tri muce so šle na potep (Three Little Cats Go Walkabouts), 2005
