= Lojze Zupanc =

- Born: 21 September 1906; Ljubljana, Austria-Hungary (now in Slovenia)
- Died: 2 June 1973 (aged 66); Škofja Loka, Socialist Federal Republic of Yugoslavia (now in Slovenia)
- Occupations: Writer; poet; playwright
- Writing career
- Notable works: Zlato pod Blegošem, Povodni mož v Savinji, Sonce je umrlo
- Notable awards: Levstik Award; 1957 for Povodni mož v Savinji; Levstik Award; 1971 for Zlato pod Blegošem

Lojze Zupanc (21 September 1906 – 2 June 1973) was a Slovene writer, poet, playwright and journalist best known for his short stories based on folktales and other traditional stories.

Zupanc was born in Ljubljana in 1906. He trained as a teacher in Ljubljana and Maribor and worked as a teacher in Štrekljevec and numerous other places in White Carniola and the Kočevje area. During the Second World War he participated in the National Liberation Struggle and was imprisoned by the Italian Fascist authorities in 1943. His experiences of imprisonment are described in the autobiographical tale Sonce je umrlo (The Sun Has Died). After the war he worked in Gornji Grad and Škofja Loka, where he retired in 1965 and lived until his death in 1973.

He won the Levstik Award twice, in 1957 for his collection of stories Povodni mož v Savinji (The River Merman in the Savinja) and in 1971 for his collection of stories Zlato pod Blegošem (Gοld Under Mount Blegoš).

== Published works ==
=== Fairy tales and fables ===
- Belokranjske pripovedke (Tales form White Carniola), 1932
- Bili so trije velikani (There Were Once Three Giants), 1932
- Dedek, povej (Tell Me Grandpa), 1939
- Čudežni rog (The Magic Horn), 1944
- Jezerka (The River Maiden), 1944
- Svirel povodnega moža in druge belokranjske pripovedke (The River Neck and Other Tales from White Carniola), 1944
- Velikan Nenasit (Neverful the Giant), 1944
- Zaklad na Kučarju (The Treasure on Kučar), 1956
- Povodni mož v Savinji (The River Merman in the Savinja), 1957
- Deklica in kač (The Girl and the Snake, 1959
- Čudežni studenec (The Miraculous Spring), 1960
- Kamniti most (The Stone Bridge), 1964
- Sto belokranjskih (A Hundred from White Carniola), 1965
- Zlato pod Blegošem (Gold under Mount Blegoš), 1971
- Sinček palček (The Tiny Son), 1979
- Deklica s tremi lešniki (The Girl With Three Hazelnuts), 1984
- Pripovedke o Škofji Loki (Tales of Škofja Loka), 2008

=== Novels ===
- Pod križem (Under the Cross), 1944
- Mlini stoje (The Mills Stand Still), 1945

=== Other stories ===
- Stari Hrk (Old Hrk), 1934
- Tretji rod (The Third Generation), 1938
- Turjačani (Lords of Turjak), 1938
- Vklenjena mladost (A Chained Youth), 1943
- Sonce je umrlo (The Sun Has Died), 1964
- Anka Mikoljeva (Anka Mikol), 1979
