= Vida Brest =

Yugoslav Slovene-language poet and writer

- Born: Majda Peterlin; 21 July 1925; Šentrupert, Kingdom of Serbs, Croats and Slovenes (now in Slovenia)
- Died: 10 November 1985 (aged 60); Golnik, Socialist Federal Republic of Yugoslavia (now in Slovenia)
- Occupations: Poet; writer; journalist; teacher; children's writer
- Writing career
- Notable works: Majhen človek na veliki poti, Tiho tiho srce
- Notable awards: Levstik Award; 1984 for Majhen človek na veliki poti

Vida Brest (true name Majda Peterlin) (21 July 1925 – 10 November 1985) was a Yugoslav Slovene-language poet, writer, journalist, and teacher, best known for her juvenile fiction, often based on her own experiences as a young Partisan during the Second World War.

Brest was born in Šentrupert in Lower Carniola in 1925. At the age of 17 she joined the resistance movement and after the end of the Second World War became a journalist and teacher. She later devoted herself to writing, her main inspiration being her own experiences during the war, but also wrote fairy tales and children's stories. From a very early age she also wrote poetry, with her first poems being published by the Partisan press during the war. A selection of her best poems was published posthumously in 1995, selected and edited by Ivan Minatti.

She won the Levstik Award in 1984 for her book of stories from the resistance entitled Majhen človek na veliki poti (A Small Man on a Big Road).

== Published works ==
=== Poetry ===
- 16 pesmi Vide Brest (16 Poems of Vida Brest), 1944
- Pesmi (Poems), 1947
- Mihčeve pesmi (Little Miha's Poems), 1951
- Teci, teci, soncu reci (Run, Run, Tell the Sun), 1986
- Tiho, tiho srce (Silent, Silent Heart), (selected and edited by Ivan Minatti), 1995

=== Prose ===
- Pravljica o mali Marjetici, zajčku, medvedu in zlati pomladi (The Story of Little Margaret, the Bunny, the Teddy, and the Golden Spring), 1951,1958
- Ptice in grm (The Birds and the Bush), 1955, 1961
- Orehovo leto (The Year of the Walnut), 1955, 1972
- Popotovanje v Tunizijo (A Trip to Tunisia), 1967
- Veliki čarovnik Ujtata (The Great Wizard Ujtata), 1974
- Prodajamo za gumbe (We Sell Buttons), 1976
- Majhen človek na veliki poti (A Small Man on a Big Road), 1983
- Mala Marjetica in gozdni mož (Little Margaret and the Forest Man), 1985
- Teci, teci, soncu reci (Run, Run, Tell the Sun), (selected and edited by Niko Grafenauer), 1986
