= Anton Polenec =

- Born: 7 October 1910; Puštal, Slovenia
- Died: 30 October 2000 (aged 90); Kranj, Slovenia
- Known for: arachnology, Polenecia
- Awards: Levstik Award; 1950 for Iz življenja žuželk Levstik Award; 1952 for Iz življenja pajkov
- Scientific career
- Fields: zoology

Anton Polenec (7 October 1910 – 30 October 2000) was a Slovene zoologist and specialist arachnologist.

Polenec was born in Puštal near Škofja Loka in 1910. He studied at the University of Ljubljana and later taught zoology and was head of the Natural History Museum of Slovenia from 1955 to 1980. He studied and described over 500 species of spiders including a new genus Centrophantes. The spider genus Polenecia is named after Polenec.

Apart from scientific contributions he also wrote numerous popular science books for young readers and won the Levstik Award twice, in 1950 for his book Iz življenja žuželk (The Lives of Insects) and in 1952 for Iz življenja pajkov (The Life of Spiders).
