= Anja Štefan (writer) =

Slovene writer, poet and story teller (born 1969)

- Born: 2 April 1969; Šempeter pri Gorici, Socialist Federal Republic of Yugoslavia (now in Slovenia)
- Occupations: writer, poet and story teller
- Writing career
- Notable works: Melje melje mlinček, Kotiček na koncu sveta
- Notable awards: Levstik Award; 2001 Melje, melje, mlinček Levstik Award; 2007 Kotiček na koncu sveta

Anja Štefan is a Slovene writer, poet and story teller.

== Biography ==
Anja Štefan was born on 2 April 1969 in Šempeter pri Gorici. She studied Slovene and English at the University of Ljubljana and graduated in 1994. After graduation she continued with studies in the field of folkloristics and she obtained her master's degree in 1999.

She works as a free-lance writer. She is one of the few Slovenian professional storytellers and the initiator of The Slovenian Storytelling Festival, started in 1998. She explores the Slovenian narrative tradition. As a poet and writer she writes mostly for children; she also retells Slovenian folk and fairytales and translates folk stories from other languages. In 1993 she began to cooperate with Ciciban and in 1998 with Cicido, the two Slovenian major magazines for children. She has received numerous awards for literary work. She won the Levstik Award twice, in 2001 Melje, melje, mlinček (Grind, Grind, Grinder) and in 2007 for Kotiček na koncu sveta (A Corner at the End of the World).

== Bibliography ==
=== Picture books ===
- Lonček na pike (A Pot for Points), 2008
- Štiri črne mravljice (Four Black Ants), 2007
- Sto ugank (AHundred Riddles), 2006
- Iščemo hišico (Looking for a Little House), 2005
- Kotiček na koncu sveta, (A Corner at the End of the World), 2005
- Bobek in barčica (Bobby and the Boat), 2005
- Lešniki, lešniki (Hazelnuts, hazelnuts), 2000
- Melje, melje mlinček (Grind, Grind, Grinder), 1999
- Čmrlj in piščalka (The Bumblebee and the Whistle), 1998

=== Folk literature ===
- Za devetimi gorami (Beyond Nine Mountains), 2011
- Trije prašički: angleška ljudska pravljica (The Three Little Pigs: An English Folk Tale), 2008
- Zajec in lisica: slovenske basni (The Rabbit and the Fox: Slovene Fables), 2004
- Čudežni mlinček: ljudske pripovedi s celega sveta (The Enchanted Mill: Folk Tales from Around the World), 2002
- O pastirčku in debeli uši: slovenska ljudska pravljica (About the Little Shepherd Boy and the Fat Louse: A Slovene Folk Tale), 2000
- Zlato kralja Matjaža: slovenska ljudska pravljica (King Matjaž's Gold: A Slovene Folk Tale), 1999
- O Pustu in zakletem gradu: slovenska ljudska pravljica (The Story of Pust and the Cursed Castle: A Slovene Folk Tale), 1999
- Čez griček v gozdiček (Over the Hill Into the Woods), 1995

== Awards ==
- Levstik Award (2001) – Melje, melje mlinček
- Growing With Books Awards (2006) – Bobek in barčica
- Best Original Slovene Picture Book Award (2007) – Sto ugank
- Levstik Award (2007) – Kotiček na koncu sveta
- Ljubljana Reads Award (2008) – Sto ugank
- Ljubljana Reads Award (2010) – Lonček na pike

== Sources ==
- Anja Štefan: »Kot pripovedovalka sem bolj zares z ljudmi.« Article in Delo, 20 March 2011
- Anja Štefan on the Mladinska Knjiga Publishing House site
