= Suzana Bricelj =

Slovene painter and illustrator

- Born: 3 September 1971 (age 54); Ljubljana, Slovenia
- Education: Academy of Fine Arts, Ljubljana
- Known for: painting, illustrating
- Notable work: Children's books illustrations
- Awards: Levstik Award; 2005 for Mala nočna torta s plameni

Suzana Bricelj (born 3 September 1971) is a Slovene painter and illustrator. Her illustrations appear in children's picture books, journals and magazines for young readers and even school books.

== Life and career ==
Bricelj was born in Ljubljana in 1971. She graduated from the Academy of Fine Arts in Ljubljana in 1998, after which she attended courses in art schools in Bratislava and Paris. Illustration is her main creative focus.

In 2005 she won the Levstik Award for her illustrations for Mala nočna torta s plameni (A Small Night Cake With Flames) from Toon Tellegen's Cake Book.

== Selected Illustrated Works ==
- Najlepše pravljice 2 (Most Beautiful Fairy Tales 2), 2009
- Mi, kosovirji (We the Cosovirs), written by Svetlana Makarovič, 2009
- Kokokoška Emilija (Emilia the Hen), written by Svetlana Makarovič, 2009
- Miklavž in Miklavžek in druge pravljice (Little Claus and Big Claus and Other Stories), written by Hans Christian Andersen, 2009
- Jelka in druge pravljice (The Fir-Tree and Other Stories), written by Hans Christian Andersen, 2009
- O kralju, ki ni maral pospravljati (About the King Who Didn't Like Tidying Up), written by Nina Mav Hrovat, 2008
- Kosovirja na leteči žlici (The Cosovirs on the Flying Spoon), written by Svetlana Makarovič, 2008
- Gospod in hruška (The Gentleman and the Pear), written by Fran Milčinski, 2007
- Eva in kozel (Eva and the Goat), written by Majda Koren, 2006
- Kako so nastale gosli (How the Fiddle Was Created), Traditional Romani Tale, 2006
- Mala nočna torta s plameni (A Small Night Cake With Flames), written by Toon Tellegen, 2004
- Družinska pesmarica: 100 slovenskih ljudskih in ponarodelih pesmi (The Family Song Book: 100 Slovene Traditional and Popular Songs), 2002
- Veliki pravljičarji in njihove najlepše pravljice (The Great Storytellers and Their Most Beautiful Stories), 2001
- Katka in Bunkec (Katka and Bunkec), written by Marjan Tomšič, 2000
- Zlato Kralja Matjaža (King Matjaž's Gold), written by Anja Štefan, 1999
- Martin Krpan z Vrha (Martin Krpan from Vrh ), written by Fran Levstik, 1999
