= List of Slovenian illustrators =

A list of notable illustrators from Slovenia:

== A ==
- Zvest Apollonio (1935–2009)

== B ==
- Milko Bambič (1905–1991)
- Emilija Bucik Razman (1935–2024)

== Č ==
- Zvonko Čoh (1956–)

== D ==
- Danijel Demšar (1954–)
- Julia Doria

== G ==
- Kostja Gatnik (1945–)
- Jelka Godec Schmidt (1958–)
- Ančka Gošnik Godec (1927–)

== J ==
- Matija Jama
- Marjanca Jemec Božič (1928–)

== K ==
- Božo Kos (1931–2009)

== M ==
- Miki Muster (1925–2018)
- Dušan Muc (1952–)

== O ==
- Mojca Osojnik (1970–)

== R ==
- Jelka Reichman (1939–)

== S ==
- Alenka Sottler (1958–)
- Matjaž Schmidt (1948–2010)
- Marija Lucija Stupica (1950–2002)
- Marlenka Stupica (1927–)

== V ==
- Kamila Volčanšek (1950–)
- Melita Vovk (1928–)
