= Stupica =

Stupica or Stupitsa (/stûpit͡sa/; Cyrillic: Ступица) is a Slavic surname that means a trap, wheel hub assembly. It may refer to

- Marija Lucija Stupica (1950-2002), Slovene children's book illustrator
- Marlenka Stupica (1927-2022), Slovene children's book illustrator, mother of Marija
- Mira Stupica (1923–2016), Serbian actress
