= List of works by Fran Levstik =

The article lists the works of the 19th-century Slovene writer, poet and playwright Fran Levstik.

== Prose ==
- Martin Krpan from Vrh (Martin Krpan z Vrha)
- A Journey from Litija to Čatež (Popotovanje iz Litije do Čateža)
- The Tenth Brother (Deseti brat, unfinished and unpublished at the time.
- The Fascicle (Zveženj)
- From the Past Happy Youth (Iz minule srečne mladosti)
- Memories about the Faiths and Thoughts of a Free Nation (Spomini o verah in mislih prostega naroda)
- Pokljuk
- Saint Doctor Bežanec in Tožbanja Vas (Sveti doktor Bežanec v Tožbanji vasi)
- Who Made Videk's Shirt (Kdo je napravil Vidku srajčico)

== Poetry ==
=== Poem collections ===
- Poems (Pesmi, 1854, COBISS 18173440)
- Tona's Poems (Tonine pesmi, 1859, COBISS 18173440)
- Franja's Poems (Franjine pesmi, 1870, COBISS 18173440)

=== Narrative poems ===
- The Fugitive King (Ubežni kralj)
- The Prince's Son (Knezov sin)
- A Flower (Roža)
- In the Upper Carniola (Na Gorenjskem)
- A Girl and a Bird (Dekle in ptica)

=== Reflective poems ===
- Homesickness (Domotožnost)
- A Reminder to Joy (Opomin k veselju)
- Spring (Pomlad)
- Omnia evanescunt
- The Artist (Umetnik)
- Literary Wisdom (Knjižna modrost)
- Despair (Obup)
- Struggle (Boj)
- Our Misery (Naša nesreča)

=== Satirical poems ===
- The Dreams of the Parish Priest (Župnikove sanje)
- To the Saint Elijah (Svetemu Eliji)
- The Slovene Literature (Slovenska literatura)
- In the Memory of the Deceased Forward (V spomin rajnega Napreja)
- The People's Voice (Ljudski glas)
- Let's Keep Silent! (Molčimo)
- To the Enemies (Sovražnikom)
- A Novel (Roman)

=== Children's Poems ===
- Our Village (Naša vas)
- A Living Flower (Živa cvetlica)
- When a Child Chases the Moon and the Stars (Kadar otrok lovi luno in zvezde)
- The Milky Way (Rimska cesta)
- A Prayer of a Simple Child (Preprostega otroka molitev)
- How is it in the Carantania (Kako je v Korotani)
- A Hedgehog and a Fox (Jež in lisica)
- A Cat, a Mouse, and a Little Mouse (Mačka, miš in miška)

== Dramatics ==
- Juntez (1855)
- Tugomer (1876)
