= Hinko Smrekar =

Slovenian artist, illustrator, painter, and partisan (1883-1942)

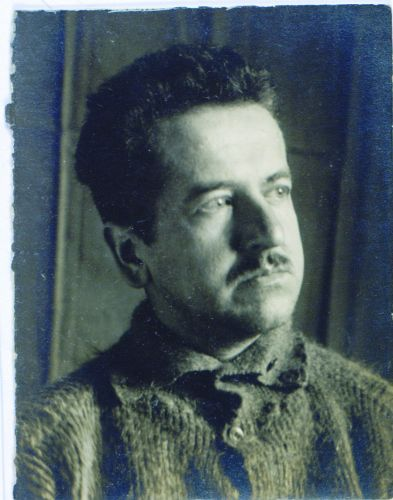
Hinko Smrekar between 1930 and 1942

Hinko Smrekar (13 July 1883 – 1 October 1942) was a Slovenian painter, draughtsman, caricaturist, graphic artist, and illustrator. Smrekar was a member of the Vesna Art Club, which was active in Vienna, and a partisan in the Liberation Front of the Slovene Nation during the Nazi occupation of Yugoslavia. The Hinko Smrekar Primary School in Ljubljana and the Hinko Smrekar Prize in Celje, the highest Slovenian award in the field of illustration (since 1993), are named after him. As a collaborator of the Slovene Liberation Front, he was hastily shot by the Italian fascists in the vicinity of a gravel pit used for summary executions (now the Gramozna Jama Memorial). At the time, he was living in the "Villa Kurnik" on Alešovčeva Street (No 38) in Šiška. He is buried in the Memorial Park of Fallen Combatants and Hostages at Žale.

== Biography ==
Smrekar was born in Ljubljana. After the 1895 earthquake, Smrekar's house collapsed due to instability, and his family moved several times afterwards. The Smrekars lived for a while in Kranj, where his father, who worked as a postman in Kranj, died in 1906.

Smrekar was a gifted child and already in grammar school he achieved a reputation as a master artist. He was also a diligent student and enrolled at the Innsbruck Law School in 1901. He lasted 4 semesters at law school, but the day before his first national exam, he sold all his books out of fear and drank the proceeds. This was a turning point in his life, at which he decided to dedicate his life to art. Although he never completed his academic education, he acquired extensive knowledge in various humanities and was also a polyglot.

In 1903, the Vesna Art Club was founded, which Hinko also joined. There he met Ivan Cankar and made several covers for his books. In 1905, he began publishing his satirical witty drawings in the Ljubljana humorous newspaper Osa. In that year, Smrekar, together with Maksim Gaspari, visited the art centre of Munich for the first time, where he returned for both short and long periods throughout his life.

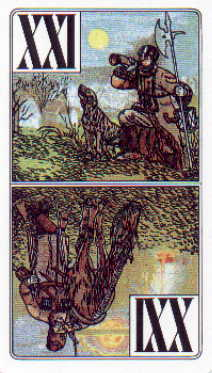
The Moon, from Smrekar's "Tarok"

Smrekar was also the author of the first tarok book published in Slovenia, the so-called "Slavic Tarok", printed between 1910 and 1912. In the years before and during the First World War, Smrekar's drawing skills did not rest, and shortly before the end of the war he was given the assignment he had long wanted: to illustrate Fran Levstik's Martin Krpan for the New Publishing House. Shortly after the war, he contracted a severe nervous disease. In 1920 and 1921 he tried to recover in a sanatorium near Graz, but his treatment took several years.

Then he started working again and tried to publish his own comic newspaper, Pikapok. However, tragedy struck in 1927 when his mother died and he was left alone. Because of his low income, he had to move out and it took him two years to build a small house where he could teach his drawing students. Due to a lack of clients, he began to focus on youth illustration. His most recent work as an illustrator was his drawings, images and initials for the collection Seven Andersen Fairy Tales for Wise Men and Women.

After the outbreak of World War II in Slovenia, he was captured by the fascists on a street march in late September 1942. Smrekar was brutally interrogated and hastily shot on 1 October of the same year at a gravel pit in Ljubljana. Even though friends and acquaintances didn't attend his funeral, his grave was covered with flowers the following day. In the political newspaper Jutro, Elko Justin published an oblique obituary for his friend: a broken spruce tree ("smreka" in Slovenian) is piled on top of the impoverished coffin, which has been nailed with a single carved sheet, and an upside-down letter R lies across the name plate bearing the word "konec", meaning "the end" - a rebus of Smrekar's name. In October 1942, the news of his death was published in the illegal newspaper Slovenski poročevalec ("Slovenian Reporter").

== Work and meaning ==
Smrekar's work is extremely colourful. He worked with all motifs, in all techniques, serious, sad, grotesque, funny, portraits, landscapes, romantic, naturalistic, national and international. He enjoyed using themes from folk tales and folk celebrations, and looked for genre motifs from the lives of ordinary people, especially peasants.

He had already resisted the war between 1914 and 1918, both personally and artistically. Two of the greatest works of Slovenian graphic art were produced in those years - the cycle of anti-war caricatures Črnovojnik ("The Black Warrior"), in which the artist humorously described his inter-war experiences, and the illustrations of Martin Krpan. These were the first illustrations of the story, which set the example for later ones, such as those by Tone Kralj. From 1939 to 1942, he worked on the collective experience of war psychosis.

== Sources ==
- Karel Dobida, 1957: Hinko Smrekar. Ljubljana: COBISS
- Karel Dobida:"Smrekar, Hinko". Slovenski biografski leksikon. Slovenska biografija. Ljubljana: ZRC SAZU, 2013 (online version)
- Filip Kalan: "Likovna umetnost - Iz zapiskov o slovenski vojni grafiki", Novi svet 5, št. 9 (1950) (Dokument v zbirki Digitalne knjižnice Slovenije online version)
- OBL Austrian Centre for Digital Humanities and Cultural Heritage: Österreichisches Biographisches Lexikon - Smrekar, Hinko (Henrik), 1883-1942 Graphiker und Maler
- Obrazi slovenskich pokrajin: Smrekar, Hinko
- Dnevnik70let: Smrekarjeve karikature in tožbe by Darinka Kladnik, 17 Dec 2011
