= Samobor (disambiguation) =

Samobor is a town in central Croatia.

Samobor may also refer to:

- Samobor, Gacko, a village in Bosnia and Herzegovina
- Samobor Fortress, a medieval monument near the Drina in Bosnia
