= Tomaž Perko =

Slovenian painter

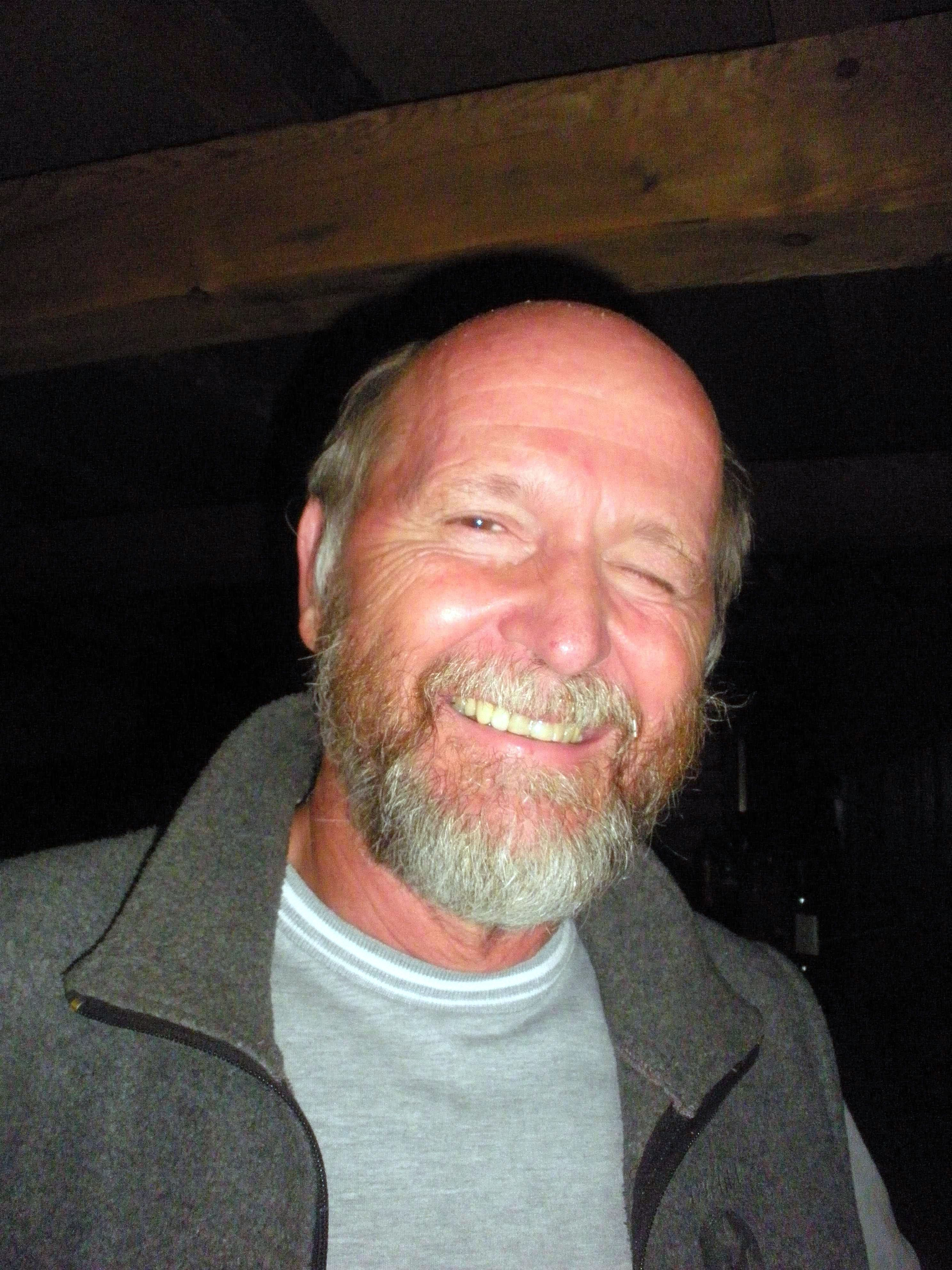
- Tomaž Perko in his studio (2011)
- Born: Tomaž Izidor Perko; 2 November 1947; Ljubljana, Yugoslavia
- Education: Academy of Fine Arts and Design
- Known for: Painting, drawing, conservation

Tomaž Perko (né Tomaž Izidor Perko; born 2 November 1947) is a Slovenian painter and conservationist. He is known for his rare orientation—in contrast to his father, Lojze, who as a painter also considered more modern approaches—to thoroughly delve into classical painting methods, especially following the example of the famous Dutch masters.

== Biography ==
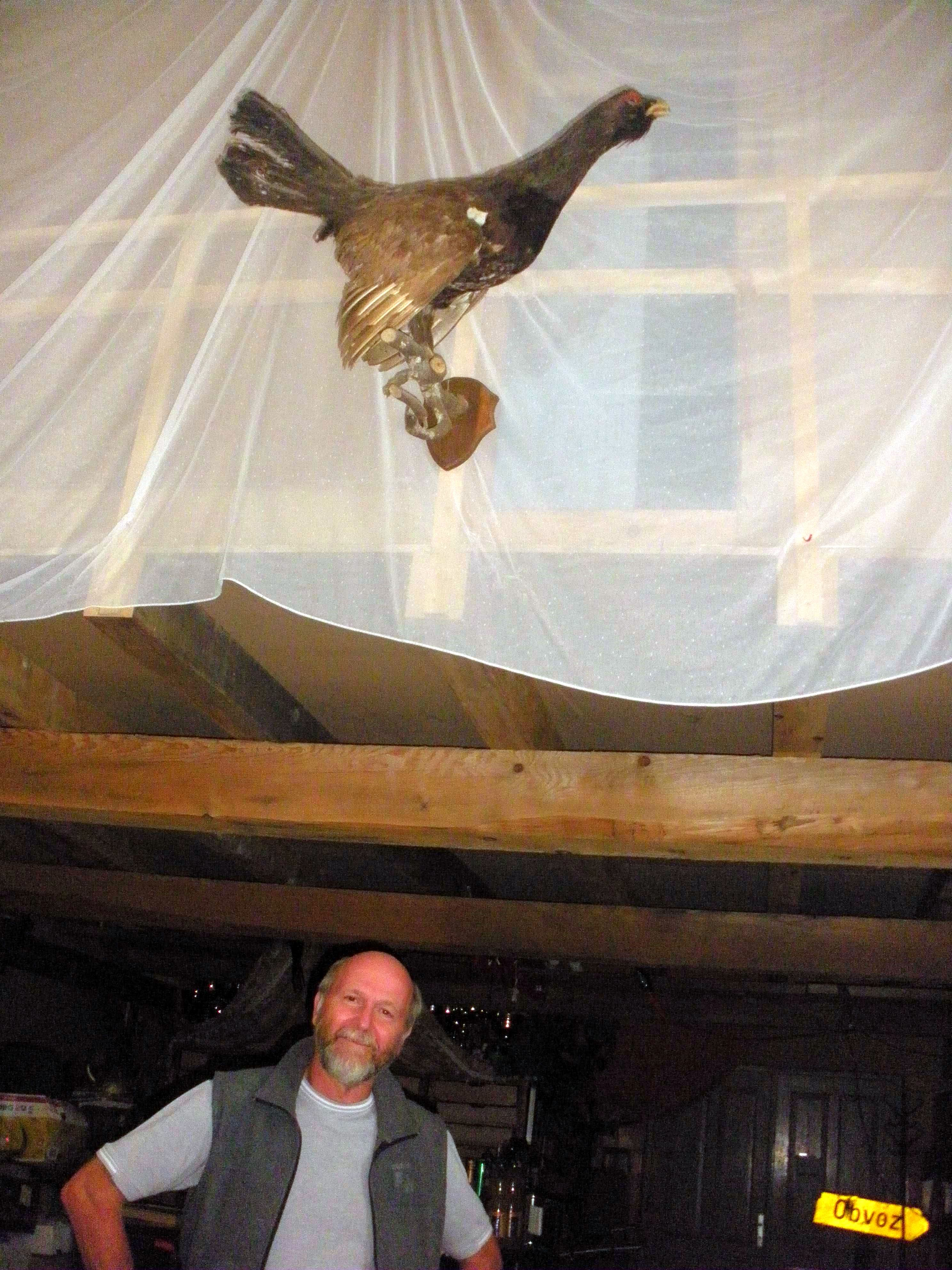
Perko in his studio in Grahovo, below a woodpecker

=== Youth and education ===
Tomaž Izidor Perko was born on 2 November 1947 in Ljubljana, Yugoslavia, into the numerous family of the Slovenian painter Lojze Perko. He spent his youth in Kamnik, where he attended school from 1954 to 1966, and also completed his high school education. He continued his education at the Academy of Fine Arts and Design in Ljubljana, where he studied painting and graduated in 1971; it was there that he continued his postgraduate studies in restoration and conservation under Professor Mirko Šubic.

== Work ==
He initially lived in Ljubljana, but since 1981, he has been living and working by Lake Cerknica. He has trained abroad several times, and has exhibited in, among others, Toronto, Vancouver, Stuttgart, Hangzhou, Brielle, Vienna, Dubrovnik, and many other places.

Tomaž is completely in love with Rembrandt and the Dutch masters in general, because "they knew how to capture the soul", and he tries to imitate them himself.

=== Exhibitions ===
He has had numerous exhibitions in his homeland since his first exhibition in Kamnik during his studies in 1970; the exhibition at the National Museum of Slovenia in May 2013 was very popular. He has received numerous awards and recognitions for his works.

Perko has been exhibiting his paintings since his youth, in conjunction with other artists, and sometimes on his own. He has exhibited both in his homeland and abroad.

=== Notable works ===
1. Painting of the Church of Mary Help of Christians in Rakovnik (Ljubljana).
2. Image of the martyr Lojze Grozde (1992), which adorned the Slovenian Eucharistic Congress 2010 in Celje on the occasion of Grozde's beatification there.
3. Chapel in the Salesian home in Trstenik
4. Stations of the Cross in the new Church of St. Joseph in Ivančna Gorica.

=== Legacy ===
Umetnostna zgodovinarka in likovna kritičarka Anamarija Stibilj Šajn

“Razmišljanje in ustvarjanje akademskega slikarja Tomaža Perka je vpeto v klasično štafelajno slikarstvo. Postalo je njegova uročna vaba, njegov način življenja, a ne zato, ker bi bil v to prisiljen ali ker bi bil konzervativen, temveč iz globokega osebnega prepričanja, da tovrstno slikarstvo premore večno privlačnost in živost ter omogoča posamezniku, skozi navidezno pripovednost motivov, vnesti osebno izpovednost, tisti, najbolj intimistični pogled. Zasidranost v preteklem torej ni njegov »hortus conclusis«, saj mu daje možnost prestopanja v sedanjost, v čas in prostor, pa tudi potop v osebne senzibilne sfere... S svojimi prepoznavnimi stvaritvami, ki premorejo njemu lastno identiteto, tvorno prispeva h kompleksni podobi slovenske likovne kulture, v kateri mora, poleg sodobnih likovnih praks in multimedijskih rešitev, ostati tudi prostor za kvalitetno klasično likovno izražanje. In slikarstvo akademskega slikarja Tomaža Perka je nedvomno tako.”

Art historian and art critic Anamarija Stibilj Šajn

“The thinking and creation of academic painter Tomaž Perko is embedded in classical easel painting. It has become his magical lure, his way of life, but not because he was forced into it or because he was conservative, but out of a deep personal conviction that this type of painting has an eternal appeal and liveliness and allows the individual, through the apparent narrative of the motifs, to introduce personal expression, that most intimate view. Anchoring in the past is therefore not his "hortus conclusis", as it gives him the opportunity to move into the present, into time and space, as well as to dive into personal sensitive spheres... With his recognizable creations, which have his own identity, he creatively contributes to the complex image of Slovenian art culture, in which, in addition to contemporary art practices and multimedia solutions, there must also remain a space for quality classical artistic expression. And the painting of academic painter Tomaž Perko is undoubtedly like that.”

== See also ==
- List of Slovenian painters
- List of Slovenian illustrators
- Slovenian art
