= Alenka Sottler =

Slovene painter and illustrator (born 1958)

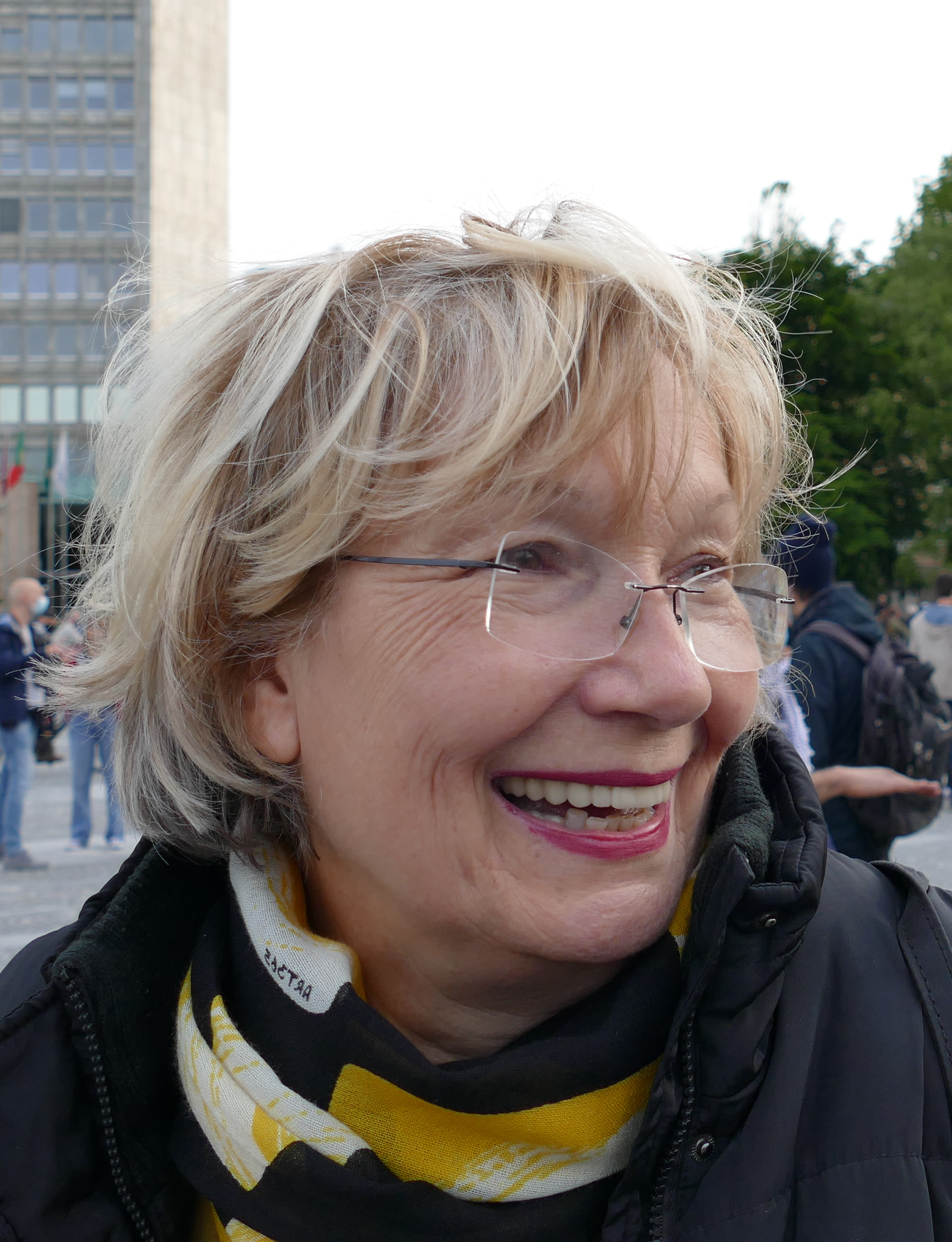
- Alenka Sottler
- Born: 24 October 1958 (age 67); Ljubljana, Slovenia
- Education: Academy of Fine Arts, Ljubljana
- Known for: painting, illustrating
- Notable work: Children's books illustrations
- Awards: Society of Illustrators Gold Medal; 2016 for book illustration Eurydice

Alenka Sottler (born 24 October 1958) is a Slovene painter and illustrator. She lives and works in Ljubljana as a freelance illustrator and is a member of New York Society of Illustrators. She has illustrated over 50 books for children and adults, for which she received numerous awards and honours including her second nomination for the Hans Christian Andersen Award in 2014.

== Life and career ==
Alenka Sottler was born in Ljubljana, the capital city of Slovenia. Her father, Gorazd Sotler, was a sculptor, a pupil of the prominent Croatian sculptor Antun Augustinčič and her mother worked for Slovenia's leading newspaper and printing company, Delo. Alenka received her first informal training in drawing and sculpture in her father's studio. She studied at the Academy of Fine Arts in Ljubljana (1976–1981) and successfully finished her postgraduate study in painting at the Academy of Fine Arts in Ljubljana in 1983. From 1988, she works as freelance painter/ illustrator for the best Slovene and foreign publishers and magazines, including Mladinska knjiga, the largest and leading Slovene publisher. In 2011, she was awarded the title of Assistant Professor of Painting by the University of Ljubljana.

She has illustrated more than 50 books and produced many illustrations for children's magazines. An important part of her output is devoted to fairytales, both modern (Oscar Wilde, Svetlana Makarovič) and classic (Folk Tales from Around the World, Brothers Grimm). Her black-white illustrations for Folk Tales from Around the World signalled her mastery and a number of awards followed. Her work is inventive, visually appealing and drawn with faultless confidence. She is contemporary in style but also well-versed in the history of visual imagery and the imagery of power, meaning and clarity. In recent years she has mainly illustrated poetry and fairytales and made original graphics/engravings for collections of poems by Malcolm de Chazal, and works on paper inspired by literature and poetry.

Today, she lives and works in Ljubljana.

== Awards ==
- 2016
  - Illustrators 58 Gold Medal, Society of Illustrators, New York, USA
- 2014
  - Hans Christian Andersen Award nomination, Mexico City, Mexico
- 2013
  - Prešeren Award (Small), Republic of Slovenia, Ljubljana, Slovenia
- 2012
  - Merit /3x3 Illustration ProShow No.9 / 3x3 The Magazine of Contemporary Illustration, New York, USA
  - Hans Christian Andersen Award nomination, Denmark
- 2011
  - "Getting Inside The Outsider", House of Illustration and The Folio Society's Inaugural Book Illustration Competition finalist, London, UK
  - The White Ravens for the book The Emperor and the Rose, Internationale Jugendbibliothek, München, Germany
- 2010
  - Hinko Smrekar Award at the 9th Slovenian Biennial of Illustration, Ljubljana, Slovenia
  - Merit at the 3x3 Magazine International Professional Show, New York, USA
  - Grand Prix at the 3rd Croatian Biennal of Illustration, Zagreb, Croatia
  - The Astrid Lindgren Memorial Award nomination, Stockholm, Sweden
- 2008
  - International Board on Books for Young People (IBBY) Honour List, Denmark
  - Italija, Bologna, Award of Excellence, Bologna Book Fair, Italy
  - Hinko Smrekar Award at the 8th Slovenian Biennial of Illustration, Ljubljana, Slovenia
- 2007
  - Levstik Award for Illustration, Ljubljana, Slovenia
  - Certificate of Merit for being selected for the 49th Annual Exhibition at the SI New York, USA
  - Golden Apple at the Biennial of Illustrations Bratislava 2007, Bratislava, Slovakia
- 2006
  - Certificate of Merit for being selected for the 48th Annual Exhibition at the SI New York, USA
  - First Prize for illustration at the 6th Slovenian Biennial of Illustration in Slovenia
  - Award for the most beautiful book at the Slovenian Book Fair, Ljubljana, Slovenia
- 2005
  - Award of Excellence for being selected in the Emperor's New Illustrations, Bologna Book Fair, Italy
  - Certificate of Merit for being selected for the 47th Annual Exhibition at the SI New York, USA
- 2002
  - First Prize for illustration at the 5th Slovenian Biennial of Illustration in Slovenia
- 2001
  - Award of Excellence at the BEIJ01 – Biennial of European Illustration in Japan
- 1999
  - Trojlistok Grand Prix of the Children's Jury at the Biennial of Illustrations Bratislava, Slovakia
- 1993
  - Hinko Smrekar Award at the 1st Slovenian Biennial of Illustration in Slovenia
- 1981
  - Prešern Award for students, Ljubljana, Slovenia

== Selected Illustrated Works ==
- Pesem za liro (Poem for Lyra), written by Bina Štampe Žmavc, 2016
- Ljubim tvoj medeni srh (I Love Your Honey Shudder), written by Mateja Blaznik, 2014
- Zašto se baka ljuti? (Why Is Granny Angry?), written by Lela B. Njatin, 2014
- Tujec (L'étranger), written by Albert Camus, 2012
- Prividi (Mirages), written by Niko Grafenauer, 2009
- Cesar in roža (The Emperor and the Rose), written by Bina Štampe Žmavc, 2009
- Svetlanine pravljice (Svetlana's Fairytales), written by Svetlana Makarovič, 2008
- Tri pesnitve (Three Poems), written by Andrej Brvar, 2009
- Pepelka (Cinderella), 2005
- Ko pridejo angelčki (When the Little Angels Come), written by Dim Zupan, 2004
- Svetovne pravljice (Fairy Tales of the World), 2004
- Mehurčki (Bubbles), written by Oton Župančič, 2004
- Anastazija Krupnik (Anastasia Krupnik), written by Lois Lowry, 2002
- Velik sončen dan: izbrane pesmi za otroke in mladino (A Big Sunny Day: selected poems for children and youth), written by Neža Maurer, 2000
