= Zagorica, Dobrepolje =

Zagorica
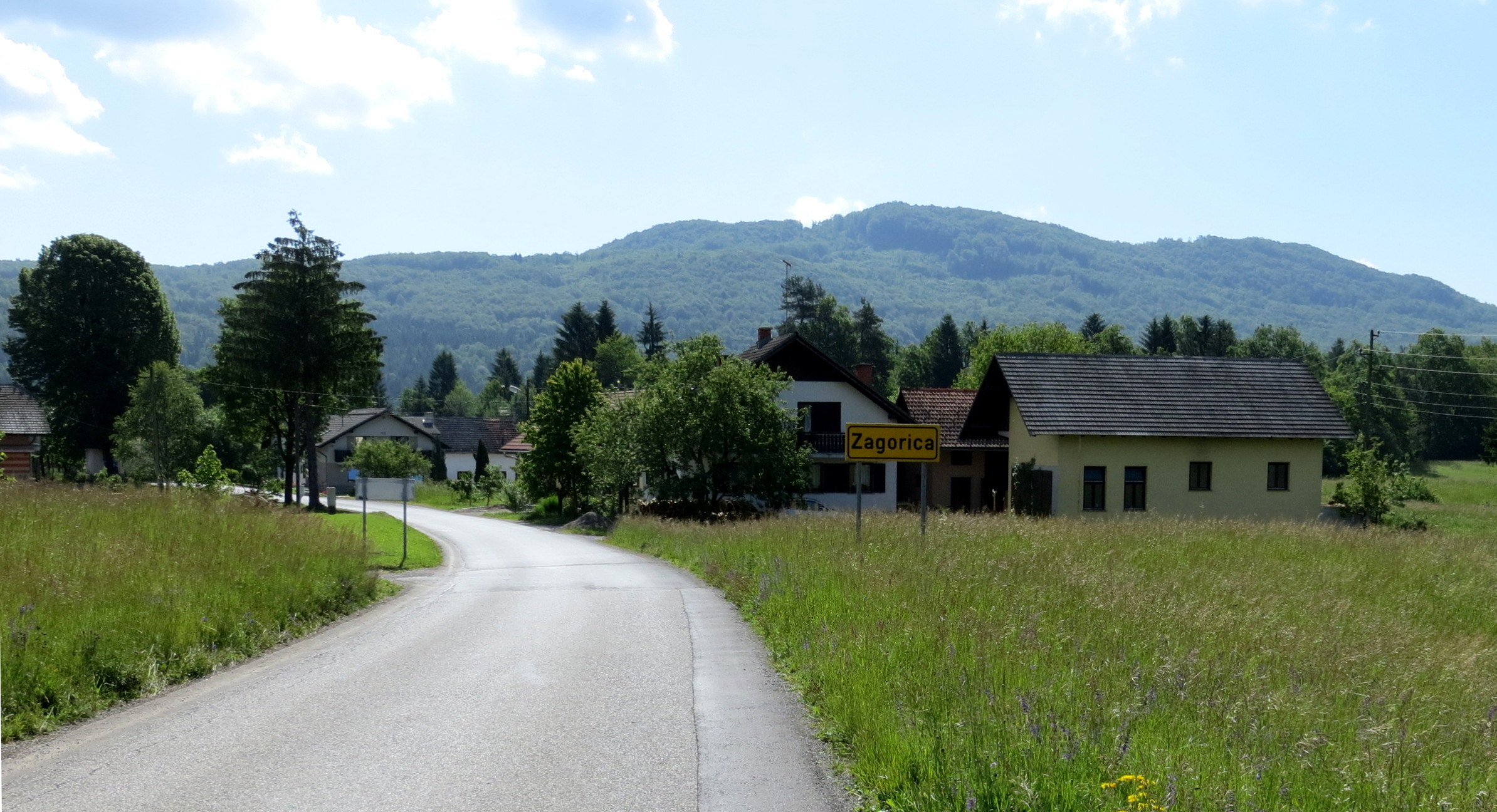

- Location in Slovenia
- Coordinates: 45°50′35.75″N 14°42′55.21″E
- Country: Slovenia
- Traditional region: Lower Carniola
- Statistical region: Central Slovenia
- Municipality: Dobrepolje

Area
  - Total: 6.05 km^{2} (2.34 sq mi)
- Elevation: 434.3 m (1,425 ft)

Population (2020)
  - Total: 210
  - Density: 35/km^{2} (90/sq mi)

Zagorica (pronounced [zaɡɔˈɾiːtsa]; German: Sagoritza) is a village east of Videm in the Municipality of Dobrepolje in Slovenia. The area is part of Lower Carniola and the municipality is now included in the Central Slovenia Statistical Region.

== Notable people ==
Notable people that were born or lived in Zagorica include:

- France Kralj (1895–1960), sculptor and painter
- Tone Kralj (1900–1975), sculptor and painter
