= Gorazd Sotler =

- Born: Gorazd Sottler; July 1, 1930; Ljubljana, Slovenia
- Died: April 21, 1987; Škofja Loka, Slovenia
- Education: Academy of Fine Arts, Ljubljana
- Known for: sculpture, drawing

Gorazd Sotler né Sottler (July 1, 1930 – April 21, 1987) was a Slovene academic sculptor. He lived and worked in Ljubljana.

== Life ==
Gorazd Sotler was born on July 1, 1930, in Šentrupert na Dolenjskem. His family later moved to Ljubljana. As a child, he learned to play the violin and he showed great drawing talent from an early age, which was confirmed by one of the famous sculptors of that time, Boris Kalin.

He attended primary and secondary school (classics programme) in Ljubljana between 1937 and 1949. Afterwards, he enrolled at the Academy of Fine Arts and Design in Ljubljana where he studied with professors Boris and Zdenko Kalin. In 1953, he travelled to Zagreb and specialised in sculpture studies at the Academy of Fine Arts at the famous sculpture Antun Avgustinčič. Gorazd Sotler graduated in 1954.

During his studies in Zagreb, young Gorazd was greatly influenced by more lyrical sculpture Frano Kršinić who was making female nude sculptures at that time. A diary exists from this period which shows great idealism and sensitivity of the young artist. Even later, female nudes, self-portraits, portraits and drawings remained the main theme in Sotler's opus. After a short trip to Paris in 1954, Sotler finished his postgraduate studies at professor Boris Kalin in Ljubljana.

Figurative influences, which brought so much inspiration for the young artist in Zagreb, were not well received in Ljubljana. The problem was that sculptures at home were much more in line with modernism so other artist and professionals did not pay much attention to Sotler's art. Furthermore, studying in Zagreb broke the continuum of sculpturing in his home town, which resulted in his lack of success to receive a public commission. He withdrew into the world of intimate plastic. He also shared his studio with a painter Marjan Dovjak for a couple of years and made an unusual portrait of the artist during that time. This portrait was later considered as one of the most astonishing portraits of the era. In May 1958, he married Sonja, née Beretič, from Šmarjeta pri Novem mestu and in October of the same year they got a daughter Alenka Sottler, who has become one of the leading illustrators in the world. After the wedding, he took a job of a primary arts teacher in Ljubljana, where he was much loved and respected by his pupils.

In the last years of his life, he left his job, got a divorce and married for the second time. His new wife was Aljoša, née Koser, and they moved to Škofja Loka. Due to poor health, he almost stopped sculpturing and focused on ceramics and painting. His untimely death ended his creativity much too soon. He died on April 21, 1987, in Škofja Loka, where he is also buried.

== Work ==
Gorazd Sotler created sculptures from different materials, but most of his work was done in iron. He welded it to form various shapes, which in parts still reflect the real nature of things. His work contains rhythmic patterns, which he achieved by repeating details. His sculptures are created in relief and usually combined from two or more figures.

While teaching at the primary school, he was commissioned to create various children's portraits, tomb sculptures, abstract sculptures in clay, wood, iron and stone. He studied female nude art and self-portrait. Many drawings and small statues were created every day, but most of them ended up in trash due to the artist's severe self-criticism. People still recount this anecdote: ‘One day, his wife’s brother Marjan visited him in the studio. When Marjan was on his way back home, he thought he saw something in the trash. When he had a closer look, he realised there was a box full of small female nude statues. He quickly took them out and carried them home, where he washed and polished them.

After a couple of months, Sotler returned his visit to Marjan. When he saw a small exhibition of the little female nude statues, he became very excited and asked him: ‘Where on earth did you get such beautiful statues?!’ Marjan told him: ‘As a matter of fact in the trash behind your house.’ Sotler could not believe his ears for he found these statues too beautiful to be his.’ Sotler’s extreme self-criticism remains one of the main reasons why so little of his work has been preserved. In the last years of his life, Sotler created a beautiful collection of paintings and ceramic sculptures. He also received a public commission to create a ceramic sculpture for the Institute of Oncology Ljubljana. His drawing were accepted at the international biennial of drawing in Rijeka (Croatia).

== Solo exhibitions ==
- Poreč Gallery, Casa Romana
- Art Statutes from Loka, Škofja Loka, Puštal Chapel
- 1969 Halifax, Canada
- 1987 Krka Gallery, Ljubljana, posthumously

== Group exhibitions ==
- Artists’ Association (AA), Škofka Loka, Castle Gallery
- AA, Idrija, Idrija Gallery
- AA, Ajdovščina, Pilon Gallery
- Ljubljana, UNIS-TOS exhibition hall
- 1954 Zagreb, Academy of Fine Arts Exhibition
- 1956 The Jakopič Pavilion, Academy of Fine Arts Exhibition
- 1959 Museum of Modern Art Ljubljana, graduates’ exhibition
- 1962 II. Biennial of Young Artists, Rijeka
- 1962 Slovenj Gradec
- 1963 Union of Slovene Fine Art Associations exhibition (USFAA), he took part in most of the USFAA exhibitions from 1963 onwards
- 1966 Verona, Italy, Modern Slovene Art
- 1973 City Art Gallery, INTART, Ljubljana
- 1976 Bežigrad Gallery
- 1977 Bežigrad Gallery
- 1978 Bežigrad Gallery
- 1978 Painting Colony Poetovio, Ptuj
- 1979 Painting Colony, Liboje
- 1986 International Biennial Rijeka

== Sources ==
- http://www.slovenska-biografija.si/oseba/sbi594266/
