= Svetlana Makarovič =

Slovenian writer, actress, illustrator and chanteuse

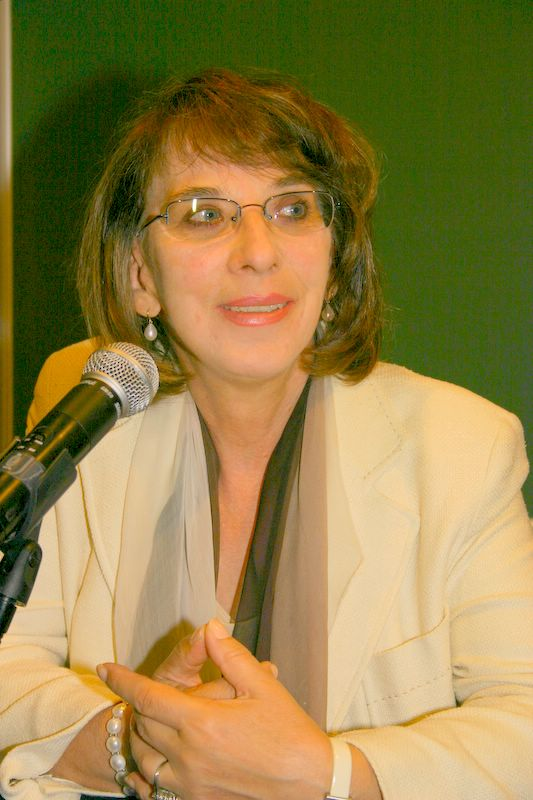
- Born: 1 January 1939 (age 87); Maribor, Slovenia
- Occupations: Writer, poet, actress, illustrator and chanteuse

Svetlana Makarovič (born 1 January 1939) is a Slovenian writer of prose, poetry, children's books, and picture books, and is also an actress, illustrator and chanteuse. She has been called "The First Lady of Slovenian poetry." She is also noted for borrowing from Slovenian folklore to tell stories of rebellious and independent women. She is a well-known adult and youth author. Her works for youth have become a part of modern classic and youth canon, which both hold a special place in history of the Slovenian youth literature. She won the Levstik Award for Lifetime Achievement in 2011.

== Biography ==
Makarovič finished secondary school for pre-school teachers in Ljubljana. In the early 1960s, she began with study of various humanistic sciences, including psychology, pedagogics, ethnology and foreign languages. Makarovič also played piano in various cafes and, for a short period, she was a secretary and teacher for children with special needs. In 1968, she finished her study at Academy for Theatre, Radio, Film and Television. Makarovič was an actress in the Ljubljana city Theatre and the Slovene National Theatre. She has been a freelance writer since 1970.

== Works ==
=== Adult works ===
Makarovič started publishing her works in magazines and newspapers in 1957. Her first poem, In the Black Pavement (Slovene: V črnem tlaku) was published in the magazine Mlada pota ("Young Paths"; 1952–1962). Other poems and magazines, in which she published, were: Naša sodobnost ("Our Contemporaneity"; 1953–1963), Tribuna ("The Tribune"; 1951–), Problemi ("Problems"; 1962, 1963), Perspektive ("Perspectives"; 1960–1964), Sodobnost ("Contemporaneity"; 1963–) and Dialog ("The Dialogue").

Her first poem collection, called Somrak ("Twilight"), was published in 1964. This one, as well as her all other works in the second half of the 1950s and early 1960s, follows the predominant path of the Slovenian lyric poetry from Intimism to Modernism. In the collection Kresna noč ("The Midsummer Night"; 1968), she expressed her personal poetics based on traditional poetic forms. Her folk poetry-based poems present a new expression of existential crisis of modern man. In the beginning of the 1970s, her poetry became more harsh in terms of form. Tragical and balad mood was the prevailing one. An example is the collection of poems Bo žrl, bo žrt ("Will Eat, will be Eaten"; 1998). Creative peaks came with her collection Srčevec ("The Heart Potion"; 1973) and the anthology Izštevanja ("Count Out"; 1977). Her poem anthology, Samost ("Aloneneness") was self-published in 2002.

In February 2012, Svetlana Makarovič published a ballad fairy tale, titled Sneguročka ("Snegurochka"), which was inspired by the Russian fairy tale character Snegurochka. Makarovič has had great passion for Russian tradition since childhood.

=== Youth poetry ===
Makarovič started releasing her youth works after 1970. In her prose works, she developed her own individual style, which is known for its original naming of characters: Zofka the Witch (coprnica Zofka), Emily the Hen (kokoška Emilija), Mishmash the Baker (pek Mišmaš) and others. These characters have premeditated character with archetypical motive of leaving home, hurt child, orphan child.

Svetlana Makarovič writes predominantly modern animal stories (picture books Pekarna Mišmaš ("The Mishmash Bakery"; 1974) and Sapramiška ("Skipmouse"; 1976), collections Take živalske ("Such Animal Ones"; 1973), Mačja preja ("Cat Yarn"; 1992) and Veveriček posebne sorte ("A Special Kind of Squirrel"; 1994)), with primarily myth-based main characters, as well as fantastic fiction (Haramija; 2005). The protagonists are animals, living in a special world and who have similar characteristics as human (they talk and act like them). The reality in the stories is not idealised. It includes cruel, selfish, envious people; gossips, grown-ups who limit children's playfulness – the reasons why these animals go through moments of loneliness, despair and sadness. Noticeable innovation of her works are taboos (e.g. sex and elimination) Škrat Kuzma dobi nagrado ("Kuzma the Gremlin Wins a Prize"; 1974) and Coprnica Zofka (1989) are regarded as stories with primarily myth-based main characters. Her stories point out, in its very core, non-understanding and non-acceptance of difference. Representative fantastic stories are Kosovirja na leteči žlici ("Cosies on the Flying Spoon"; 1974), Kam pa kam kosovirja? ("Where to, Oh, Where to, Cosies?"; 1975) and Mi, kosovirji ("We, Cosies"; 2009). The storyteller is taking the side of free being and opposes rules and demands of authorities. Some of her works were tape recorded (Pekarna Mišmaš (1976), Sapramiška (1986), Čuk na palici ("A Screech Owl on a Stick"; 1988), Mali kakadu ("The Little Cockatoo"; 1989), Sovica Oka ("Big-Eyes the Little Owl"; 1992) and others).

=== Curriculum for Slovenian language at schools ===
Her works have been recommended in Curriculum for Slovene language (2011): Jaz sem jež ("I'm a Hedgehog"), Čuk na palici, Pismo ("A Letter"), Sovica Oka, Papagaj in sir ("The Parrot and the Cheese"), Zajček gre na luno ("The Bunny Goes to the Moon"), Razvajeni vrabček ("Spoilt Little Sparrow"), Pod medvedovim dežnikom ("Under the Bear's Umbrella"), Jazbec in ovčka ("The Badger and the Sheep"), Prašičkov koncert ("The Pig Concert"), Pekarna Mišmaš, Coprnica Zofka, Kosovirja na leteči žlici, Miška spi ("The Mouse Sleeps"), Volk in sedem kozličkov ("The Wolf and the Seven Little Goats"), Kam pa kam, kosovirja, Jutro ("The Morning").

=== Music participation ===
She has published some books of chansons, e.g. Krizantema na klavirju ("Chrysanthemum on Piano"; 1990), and has performed her own works on musical recitals before invitation-only audiences. The subjects of her chansons are very like those of her poems - the lyrics address the fields of modern family upbringing, social habits, moral norms and social conventions. A difference is that in her chansons there is more humor.

She has recorded albums of her interpretations of her own chansons: Nočni šanson ("Night chanson" - 1984); Dajdamski portreti ("Dajdamski Portraits" - 1985); Pelin žena ("Poison Woman" - 1985, with Dennis González); Namesto rož ("Instead of Flowers" - 1999).

She also wrote lyrics for some standards: Mesto mladih , Na na na (Neca Falk), V Ljubljano (Marjana Deržaj) and an intro song for the movie Sreča na vrvici (Marjeta Ramšak).

=== Cooperation with the Ljubljana Puppet Theatre ===
Her work named Sovica Oka was introduced in 1972 on the stage of Ljubljana Puppet Theatre. Sapramiška is a puppet show which was played most times. It was first performed on 17 October 1986. Svetlana Makarovič cooperated with LGL in many ways – she wrote and put music to lyrics; wrote and adapted text, made the designs for puppets and sets; she even performed sometimes. She played a part in 31 shows; she was a host in Italy, Austria, Mexico, Australia, and Croatia.

==== Selection of stage acts from Svetlana Makarovič ====
- Sovica Oka, 1972 (author and adaptation) (Oka the Owl)
- Hiša tete Barbare, 1975 (author) (The Aunt Barbara's House)
- Pekarna Mišmaš, 1977 (author, text adaptation) (The Mishmash Bakery)
- Igra o letu, 1983 (author) (The Flying Game)
- Mačja prodajalna, 1984 (author, music, role) (Cat Store)
- Mrtvec pride po ljubico, 1986 (author) (Dead Man Comes for his Mistress)
- Sapramiška, 1986 (author, roles /Sapramiška, Regica, aunt Grizelda/, music) (Skipmouse)
- Mi, kosovirji, 1988 (author, text adaptation) (We, the Cosies)
- Korenčkov Palček, 1989 (author, roles /Sapramiška, Kukavec, Regica, Belouška Jarmila/, music, puppet design) (The Carrot Dwarf)
- Gal med lutkami, 1992 (author, music, puppet design) (Gal among Puppets)
- Medena pravljica, 1994 (direction, author, vloge /Sapramiška, Regica, Zajček/, glasba, likovna zasnova lutk, likovna zasnova scen) (Honey Fairytale)
- Jólakötturinn, 1997 (direction, translation and adaptation of text, song texts, adaptation of Iceland music motifs, music performance, roles) (Jartruda, Mačkursson, Gryla)
- Kokoška Emilija, 1997 (direction, author, role /kokoška Kika/, music, music arrangement) (Emily the Hen)
- Tacamuca, 1998 (author, music) (Pussypaws)

== Criticism of Slovenian society ==
Svetlana Makarovič quit the Slovene Writers' Association, because she disagreed with the standards for allocation of membership. She believed that the main criterion should be quality, not quantity. She defied official publishers, claiming they only exploit authors. Besides that, she strived for social rights of freelance artists. She stood up for the founding of a new, opened to pluralism and only-literature dedicated magazine (1980), but did not cooperate with Nova revija, which started to come out in 1982. Current political and ideological issues supposedly pushed out the art. She forbade publishing of her works in any anthologies or school books, based on her belief that her black and deathlike poetry would be a big reason that young people hate literature. She regards her works not as national goods but as a protected author property. She opposes communist saying that art is for all people. She declined her placement in the Anthology of Slovenian female writers, because the criterion was gender and not quality.

She expresses her criticism of her social environment through columns. In 2000, she declined the public reception of the Prešeren Award.

=== Slovenceljni ===
Makarovič perceives image of Slovenes as cold-hearted, primitive, hypocritical and servile. She contemptuously calls them Slovenceljni. In her satirical poems Pesmi o Sloveniji za tuje in domače goste ("Poems about Slovenia for Domestic and Foreign Guests"; 1984), she disintegrated mythicised self-image of Slovenes using quite witty irony. She portrayed them as narcissistic, primitive, aggressive on the inside, naive on the outside through travesty of popular tale of Martin Krpan and through allusion on Holy Bible. She mocked the same image in her chansons, collected in Krizantema na klavirju (1990)

== Anti-Catholic stance ==
In January 2012, Svetlana Makarović caused a controversy with her statement: "In my opinion the Catholic Church in Slovenia is something one must hate. I feel it as my civic duty." The statement was part of an interview published by the Planet Siol.net web portal.

The Council of Lay Catholics of Slovenia designated the statement "crooked, primitive and unacceptable", and in contradiction with the Constitution of Slovenia. The office of the Human Rights Ombudsman in Slovenia as well as the Slovenian police have received several initiatives for intervention. The office did not take a stance in this particular case, but has denounced all forms of publicly expressed hatred and intolerance pointed towards individuals and individual groups due to their personal circumstances. Zdenka Čebašek Travnik, the ombudsman, explained: "For me as a person and the human rights ombdusman, it is unacceptable that the artist used her gift in such a harsh way, which hurts and wounds people." Nataša Pirc Musar, the Information Commissioner of the Republic of Slovenia, did not study the case as it was out of her jurisdiction, but condemned the statement. Aleš Gulič, the director of the Office for Religious Communities, explained that he does not see the statement as a call to lynch and added: "It's not nice what the poet said, but actually, she was just angered due to the acts that are really controversial, and due to the concealement of these acts. From her statements, I've only read her personal stance towards the Catholic Church as an institution."

== Bibliography ==
=== Adult poetry ===
- Somrak, Cankarjeva založba, 1964 COBISS 735031 (Twilight)
- Kresna noč, DZS, 1968 COBISS 2035976 (Midsummer night)
- Volčje jagode, Obzorja, 1972 COBISS 7036673 (Wolfberries)
- Srčevec, Cankarjeva založba 1973 COBISS 7931905
- Pelin žena, Mladinska knjiga, 1974 COBISS 8474625 (Poison Woman)
- Vojskin čas (pesniški list), Založništvo Tržaškega tiska, 1974 COBISS 7115009 (Time of the Army)
- Izštevanja, Cankarjeva založba, 1977 COBISS 10117377 (Count out)
- Pesmi (besedila sodobnih jugoslovanskih pisateljev / Svetlana Makarovič, Niko Grafenauer, Tomaž Šalamun), Mladinska knjiga, 1979 COBISS 11433729 (Poems)
- Sosed gora, Obzorja, 1980 COBISS 18300160 (Neighbour mountain)
- Pesmi o Sloveniji za tuje in domače goste, Lutkovno gledališče, 1984 COBISS 1122590 (Poems of Slovenia for foreign and domestic guests)
- Svetlana Makarovič, France Mihelič – Pesmi Svetlane Makarovič in Risbe Franceta Miheliča, Cankarjeva založba, 1987 COBISS 92471
- Krizantema na klavirju. Šansonska besedila Svetlane Makarovič, Printing, 1990 COBISS 21714688 (Chrysanthemum on piano)
- Tisti čas, Mladika, 1993 COBISS 34033152 (That time)
- Bo žrl, bo žrt (izbrane pesmi), Mladinska knjiga 1998 COBISS 75903232 (Will eat, will be eaten)
- Samost, samozaložba, 2002 COBISS 115857664 (Aloneness)

=== Adult prose ===
- Prekleti kadilci, Center za slovensko književnost, 2001 COBISS 110859008 (Damn smokers)
- S krempljem podčrtano, Center za slovensko književnost, 2005 COBISS 7772980 (Underlined with a claw)
- Saga o Hallgerd, Arsem, 2010 COBISS 252384512 (The Hallger Saga)

=== Youth literature ===
- Maček Titi, Samozaložba, 1980 COBISS 63025 (Titi the Cat)
- Gal v galeriji, Mladinska knjiga, 1981 COBISS 19585537 (Gal in the gallery)
- Dedek mraz že gre, Lutkovno gledališče, 1982 COBISS 311838 (Dedek Mraz is coming)
- Krokodilovo kosilo: pesnitev – grozovitev, samozaložba, 1983 COBISS 10431537 (Crocodile lunch: poem – dreadness)
- Čuk na palici, Delavska enotnost, 1986 COBISS 16260865 (Owl on the stick)
- Črni muc, kaj delaš?, Dokumentarna, 1987 COBISS 2672898 (Black cat, what are you doing?)
- Kaj bi miška rada?, Dokumentarna, 1987 COBISS 2673410 (What would a mouse want?)
- Poprtnjački, Dokumentarna, 1988 COBISS 2492930 (Clothers)
- Kaj lepega povej, DZS, 1993 COBISS 37062656 (Tell me something nice)
- Show strahov: pesnitev grozovitev, DZS, 1995 COBISS 50371584 (The fear show: poem – dreadness)
- Veliki kosovirski koncert, Lutkovno gledališče, 2001 COBISS 110869760 (The grand kosovirian concert)
- Strahec v galeriji, Narodna galerija, 2003 COBISS 124647424 (Spook in the gallery)
- Mačnice, Center za slovensko književnost, 2006 COBISS 228643072 (Catters)
- Coprniški muc: pesnitev coprnitev, Miš, 2008 COBISS 238920448 (Witchy Cat: poem of witcherness)

=== Prose and poetry works ===
- Kosovirja na leteči žlici, Mladinska knjiga, 1974 COBISS 295454 (Kosovirs and flying spoon)
- Kam pa kam, kosovirja?, DZS, 1975 COBISS 1111048 (Where to, Kosovirs?)
- Mačje leto, Dokumentarna, 1987 COBISS 93239 (Year of the Cat)
- Zajčkovo leto, Državna založba Slovenije, 1993 COBISS 33629184 (Year of the bunny)
- Mi, kosovirji, Miš, 2009 COBISS 245904640 (We, the Kosovirs)

=== Storytelling for youth ===
Fairy tale collections

- Miška spi, Mladinska knjiga, 1972 COBISS 8669953 (Sleepin Mouse)
- Take živalske, Borec, 1973 COBISS 2652161 (Those Beastlies)
- Vrček se razbije, Mladinska knjiga, 1975 COBISS 9129473 (Jug Is Broken)
- Glavni petelinček, Mladinska knjiga, 1976 COBISS 9308417 (The Chief Rooster)
- Vrtirepov koledar: 1977, Partizanska knjiga, 1976 COBISS 19116801 (Tailwhippers Calendar)
- Pravljice iz mačje preje, Borec, 1980 COBISS 2657537 (Cat Yarn Fairytales)
- Mačja preja, Mladika, 1992 COBISS 32244992 (Cat yarn)
- Smetiščni muc in druge zgodbe, Mladinska knjiga, 1999 COBISS 104616192 (Scruffycat and Other Stories)
- Svetlanine pravljice = Svetlana's fairytales, Miš, 2008 COBISS 241976832 (Svetlana's Fairytales)

=== Author translations and adaptions ===
- Picko in Packo, translation of Wilhelm Busch picture book Max und Moritz, Založništvo tržaškega tiska, 1980 COBISS 5665536
- Maček Mačkursson, translation of works of Jólakötturinn Hallveig Thorlacius, Mladinska knjiga, 1997 COBISS 65732608
- Strahopetko, translation of Fünfter sein Ernst Jandl, Mladinska knjiga, Ljubljana, 1999 COBISS 78386432

== Discography ==
=== Albums ===
- Nočni šanson (1984)
- Dajdamski portreti (1985)
- Pelin žena (with Dennis González) (1986) COBISS 1408311
- Namesto rož (1999) COBISS 8253751

== Awards ==
=== Recognition awards ===
- 2011: Freewoman of Ljubljana

=== Awards ===
- 1968: Yugoslavian award Sterijino pozorje in Novi Sad
- 1975: Levstik Award (for pesniški list Vojskin čas)
- 1975: Yugoslavian award Zmajeve dječje igre
- 1976: Prešeren Fund Award (for the poem collection "War Time")
- 1987: Janusz Korczak Honour List
- 1994: Jenko Award
- 1994: IBBY Honour List
- 1998, 2000, 2002: nomination for Andersen Award
- 2000: Prešeren Award
- 2002: viktor for life's work
- 2009: Golden Order for Merits of the Republic of Slovenia
- 2011: Levstik Award (for life's work)
- 2012: Golden Coin of Poetry
- 2021: Ježek Award
