= Samobor Fortress =

Medieval fortress in Bosnia and Herzegovina

Coordinates: 43.671341°N 19.112950°E

- Goražde / Novo Goražde; Bosnia and Herzegovina
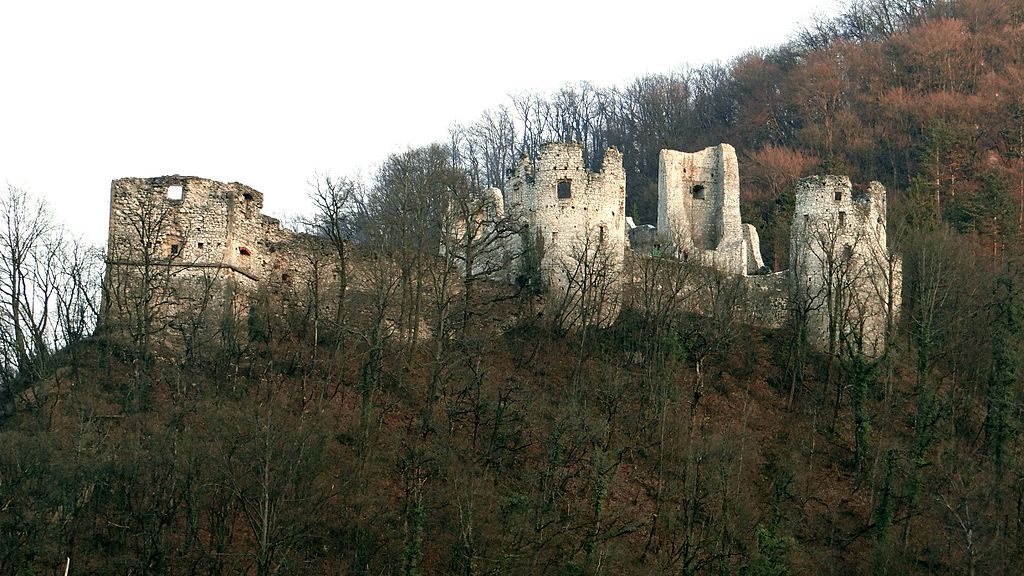
- Samobor on Drina, one of the residences of Kosača family

Site information
- Type: Castle (residential, fortification)
- Owner: Kosača noble family
- Controlled by: Sandalj Hranić May 1404 to at least 1 November 1423; Stjepan Vukčić Kosača; Banate of Bosnia, Kingdom of Bosnia, Ottoman Empire
- Open to the public: yes
- Condition: Repaired

Location
- Location within Bosnia and Herzegovina

Site history
- Built: 14th c.
- Built by: multilayered (probably of local Illyrian origine)
- Materials: Limestone (partly ashlar)
- Battles/wars: Ottoman siege

Garrison information
- Designations

KONS of Bosnia and Herzegovina
- Official name: "Old Samobor fort, the architectural ensemble (2770)".
- Type: Category I historical monument
- Criteria: II. Value - Criteria for designation A, B, C iv.vi., D ii., F ii.iii., G i.ii.v., H i.
- Designated: 20 Jan 2006
- Reference no.: 2770
- Decision no.: 05.2-2-257/05-7
- Site is protected as National Monument of Bosnia and Herzegovina by the KONS BiH

Samobor Fortress is a medieval fortress located on the Drina River, in the municipality of Novo Goražde, Bosnia and Herzegovina. The fortress was built in the 14th century by Grand Duke of Bosnia, Sandalj Hranić. His heir Stjepan Vukčić held the fortress until the arrival of the Ottoman invaders in 1465. The fortress and its surroundings are declared a National Monument of Bosnia and Herzegovina by KONS.

== Etymology ==
According to tradition, the name Samobor, both for this and the fortress of the same name near Gacko, comes from a single, solitary pine tree that stood on a cliff during the period when the fortress was built.

== Location ==
The old town of Samobor is located on a rocky hilltop, on one of the slopes of the Borovska mountain, above the confluence of the Janjina and Drina rivers. From the highest point of the town, located in the northwestern part, the road leading through the Drina valley could be controlled, as well as the local road leading through the Janjina valley. It covers an area of more than one hectare and is one of the largest preserved fortifications in Bosnia and Herzegovina. It was built on a sloping and rocky terrain, with narrow passages and small plateaus. The very jagged shape of this fortified town is adapted to such a terrain configuration. Although it is destroyed, Samobor is the best-preserved fortification that belonged to the Kosači in the Upper Podrinje. At some points, the town is 350 to 400 meters wide. The southern, northern and eastern parts of the fortification were only partially dangerous because the cliffs themselves were sufficient protection.

Today, access to the city is possible from the road that leads through the Janjina Valley, with a relatively steep climb of about an hour. About halfway along the hike, there is a plateau rich in water from a nearby spring, on which the village of Vinje was located. From here, you can reach the medieval route of the road that leads to the entrance to the city itself. You can also reach the city by climbing from Međurečje to the village of Vinje and further to the city. It is assumed that the latter was 4-5 kilometers long. The only access to the city is from the southwest, because at this point the difficult-to-access cliff on which the fortress is located is divided from the northwest by impassable ravines and cliffs from the Borovska Planina massif, and a large gorge stretches from the southeast, east and northwest.

The location of the fortification on the slopes of Borovska Planina Mountain
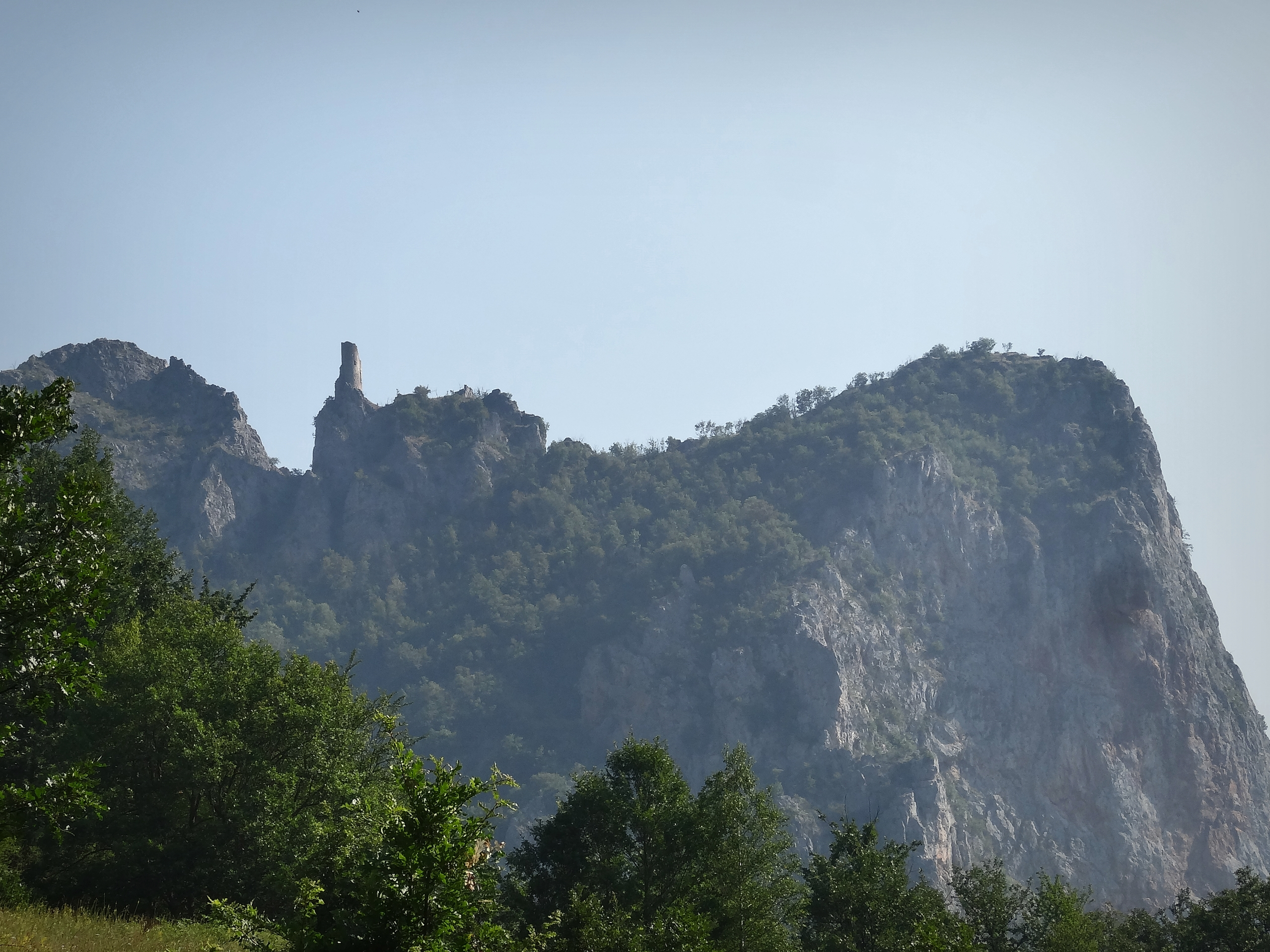
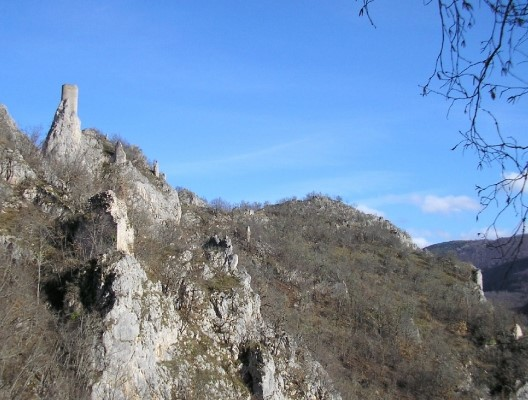

== History ==
The region of the upper Drina, which extends around the upper reaches of the Drina River, is mentioned by the priest Dukljanin at the end of the 13th century. Since that time, the political and economic importance of this region can be traced. This region fell under the Kotromanić state in 1373, when Ban Tvrtko I and Prince Lazar defeated Nikola Altomanović and divided his territories by agreement. At the end of the 14th century, when the regional lords began to strengthen, the region of the upper Drina was given to the Vlatko Vuković by now the king Tvrtko I. It remained under their rule until it fell under Ottoman rule in 1465.

The old town of Samobor was first mentioned in 1397. It was built by Grand Duke of Bosnia, Sandalj Hranić, and was one of the most favorite residences of the Kosačas. It is mentioned more often in documents from the first half of the 15th century, in connection with the stay of Ragusan envoys with Sandalj Hranić. In a document dated January 13, 1423, in the itinerary of a Ragusan embassy, the suburbs of Samobor are also mentioned, where the Ragusan emissaries met Sandalj. Samobor and its suburbs were not a frequent destination for trade caravans at that time, so by 1435, only three caravans with a destination in Samobor were recorded in historical sources.

Samobor was one of the main cities of Grand Duke of Bosnia, Stjepan Vukčić Kosača, who inherited it from his uncle Sandalj Hranić in 1435. The city of Samobor in the parish of Pribud is mentioned in the charter of the Aragonese-Neapolitan King Alfonso V of February 19, 1444, confirming the names of his listed possessions to Stjepan Vukčić Kosača. The city of Samobor and its surroundings are mentioned in two charters of similar content: the first charter was issued on January 20, 1448 by the Holy Roman King Frederick III; the second was issued on April 1, 1454, again by King Alfonso V. Duke Stjepan issued a charter on October 13, 1461 in nearby Međurečje. During the time of Duke Stjepan, Samobor is more frequently mentioned in historical sources during the period of the Ottoman invasion in 1465 and 1466. In December 1464, the Hungarian king Matthias Corvinus captured Jajce from the Ottomans. He was assisted in this by Duke Stjepan and his son Vlatko. King Matthias promised the Duke help with the threatened cities, as he himself already had a plan to capture Zvornik. Since King Matthias did not send the promised help, the Duke suggested that he send his garrisons and take five of the Duke's cities, whose situation was very difficult. In April 1465, the duke still held the city of Samobor, along with some neighboring cities in eastern Serbia and Podrinje, but not for long. In the late spring of that year, the Ottoman army, under the command of the Bosnian Sanjakbey Isa-beg Ishaković, penetrated the lands of Duke Stjepan. Of the duke's cities in Upper Podrinje, Samobor was the first to fall into their hands. Even in this last period of the Herzegovinian rule in the Upper Drina, the suburb of Samobor did not develop into a stronger trading center, and its residents only rarely, in small amounts, borrowed money from Dubrovnik. It is not clear where the suburb of Samobor was located.

According to the census from 1469, Samobor belonged to the Hercegovina vilayet, part of the Bosnian sanjak. Since Samobor was important for the wider area, after the establishment of the nahija, it became the center of the Pribud or Samobor nahiyah. The Hercegovina Vilayet was, as a military-political unit, divided into two seraskerlukas - two military commands. The seraskerluka in which the Samobor nahiyah was located was headed by the serasker Senkur. In judicial and administrative terms, this vilayet was divided into two kadiluks: Drina and Blagaj. The Samobor nahija belonged to the cadiluka of Drina, which included the area of the Upper Drina, with its headquarters in Foča. In the period 1572-1582, Čajniče separated from the nahija of Samobor or Pribud, Međurečje and Duboštica. The kadiluk of Čajniče separated from the Herzegovina nahiyah in 1667 and was annexed to the Bosnian sanjak. The nahiya under the dual name Samobor or Pribud is mentioned until the beginning of the 18th century, when the cadilly of Čajniče again belonged to the Sanjak of Herzegovina. From the occupation until 1832, when the fortress was abandoned, the Ottomans kept a permanent garrison there, led by a dizdar. Around 1800, there were three branches of the army in the city: 20 mustahfiz (fortress guards, timarnici), 18 jebedjija (armorers) and an unknown number of gunners.

== Outlook ==
The old town of Samobor is composed of several units, separate parts that functioned together and each of those parts had a specific role.

=== Southwest walls ===
The main entrance to the entire fortification complex was guarded by a tall three-sided tower with a base in the shape of an approximately equilateral triangle, whose walls were 1.8-2.1 meters thick. To this day, the wall has survived up to the ceiling of the ground level, and the formwork from the walls on the upper floor of this tower has been completely destroyed. The city wall, which rises to the northeast and is 1.5 meters thick, rests against the eastern side of the tower. In this wall, directly next to the tower, there is an arched gate. The southern walls of the western fortress were not even built because the approach from this side of the fortress is inaccessible. The shape of this tower stands out and is one of the most exceptional phenomena in Bosnia and Herzegovina. From the entrance, a path about 400 meters long leads through natural, narrow and sometimes steep ravines to the eastern part of the fortress.

=== Eastern walls ===
The eastern part of the fortified city is inaccessible on three sides because the rocks here are the steepest. On the western side it was protected by the western, entrance tower. Through the middle of the eastern part of the fortress from west to east, a wide natural cut extends, which was probably adapted for the construction of wooden houses. In some places, there are regularly trimmed stone boulders that could have served as bases for the pillars of residential houses or as platforms for cannons. At protruding points on the northern side, there are remains, i.e. some narrow sections of the wall of smaller guards and guard benches carved into the living rock. The aforementioned road led to another gate that protected the entrance to the central part of the city, through which one could climb the main tower in the northwest and access the eastern rampart of the fortress. At the end of the 19th century, it was recorded that this entrance to the inner part of the city was protected by two square towers up to 8 meters high, between which there was a door. In 1973, it was noted that to the northeast of this entrance were the remains of a tower. Today, the entrance is no longer visible, and only the corner section of one of the towers remains.

=== Central town ===
The central part of the fortification includes the area around the mosque, which was located 20 meters northeast of the aforementioned entrance. The mosque is assumed to have been built by converting an old church from Sandalj's time. At the end of the 19th century, the then imam of the Samobor mosque, Mula Osman Imamović, said that the originally built mosque was larger, like the church on whose foundations it was built. It was destroyed twice because it was built on uneven terrain that slopes to the west. In 1892, Delić saw the remains of the altar arch between the eastern wall of the mosque and the rock, while the western entrance to the church had collapsed into a ravine. In order to avoid collapse, the length of the mosque was built along the width of the former church during the reign of the Bosnian governor Malovan Ali Pasha in 1763. The second repair of the mosque followed in 1886-87. The mosque, together with the porch, was 10 meters long, the walls were one meter thick, 3 meters high, and up to 8 meters on the western side. They were built of stone and tufa, coated with lime, and the roof was wooden. In a photo published in 1912, the mosque building was still intact, while in 1973, only the remains of the mosque's foundations were found.

==== Judges' stone chairs ====
In this part of the fortification, from the entrance to the central and upper part of the city all the way up to above the mosque, there are four so-called chairs carved into the living rock along the road. The first of them is located on the left side of the road, about 1.5 meters high, in the shape of an irregular trapezoid with a rectangular seat; the second chair is 5 meters away from the first and faces the interior of the city, and from it you can see the donjon tower; the third chair is located on the right side of the road, about 15 meters away from the first, it has the shape of two steps, one of which faces Međurečje, and the other towards the donjon tower, it is damaged and is missing part of the roof and part of the base on the southeast side; the fourth chair is 6 meters away from the previous one, on the left side of the road, and it is also damaged - it is missing the central part for sitting.

=== Upper town ===
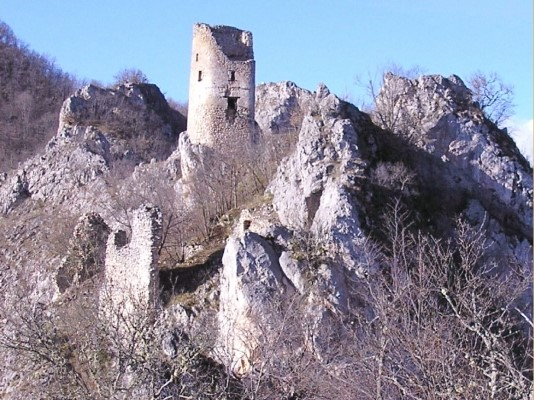
Today's appearance of the fortress with the remains of the tower that towers over the other parts

At the top of the fortress is the most completely preserved building in the entire city. It is the main tower, which was built on a protruding rock at the extreme northwestern tip of the city and dominates a large part of the surrounding area. Built on top of the rock, towering high above the other parts of the fortress, this tower represents one of the most beautiful and certainly the most interesting structures among the medieval fortresses in Bosnia and Herzegovina. The tower has been preserved at a little more than half its original height, about 11 meters. The area east of the tower is the steepest, intersected by a dense network of ramparts, walls and retaining walls, and it is assumed that wooden buildings once stood here. The tower has an irregular elliptical base, and the narrower side walls are rounded on the outside. Three levels of the tower, which was entered over a bridge, have been preserved. The approach to the bridge was protected on both sides by wings that formed an arch, built of limestone. The internal dimensions of the tower are 4 × 2 meters, and the external ones are 6.9 × 4.55 meters. The walls are of different thicknesses, from 1.3 to 1.9 and 0.9 to 1.05 meters. When Stevan Delić examined the fortress, he determined that the tower was still preserved at a height of 18 meters, while in 1973 it was only 11 meters high. It is built of properly hewn stone and travertine blocks arranged in horizontal rows. The architraves above the doors and windows are made of thick oak beams. The tower is buried inside with collapsed walls, and its stones are found in the abysses of Ioannina, which are over 200 meters deep here. According to a picture from 1912, it had one more floor than in 1973, and to this day, part of the southeastern wall has completely collapsed. On a lower and somewhat wider plateau northeast of the highest part of the city with the main tower, the final remains of some buildings can be seen, the shape and size of which cannot be determined without archaeological research.

=== South walls ===
The southern fortress is located about 150 meters below the central plateau. It was connected to the central part of the city by a rampart with broken lines, which was adapted to the steep terrain. At the bottom of the ramparts are the remains of a square-based tower, with a gate on the north side. At the end of the last century, it had all four walls, and in 1973, researchers no longer found the eastern wall, which had fallen into the abyss. Behind the southern tower, the slope drops almost vertically into Ioannina. For a few years before the Austro-Hungarian occupation, it served as a penal colony, although the city was abandoned in 1832.

== Current status ==
Samobor is one of those fortresses in Bosnia and Herzegovina that, due to negligence, was left to the ravages of time and most of it is now in ruins. The main reason for this is certainly the lack of roads that would enable the transport of materials and the undertaking of major archaeological and conservation works. The Institute for the Protection of Monuments of Bosnia and Herzegovina was the project leader, which carried out an architectural survey of the situation and a detailed reconnaissance of the monument in 1973.

As early as 1892, it was determined that not much remained of the fort. All of the wooden material had disappeared, and parts of the fort made of solid materials had begun to collapse. In 2005, when the site was re-examined, it was found that the walls were in ruins and that the main tower was the best preserved, although its walls were also cracked. The mosque could not be seen on the surface, and the arch over the first, western entrance was on the verge of collapse. In many parts of the fortification, the wall cladding had fallen off, and the roads were inaccessible and overgrown.

Today's remains of the old town of Samobor

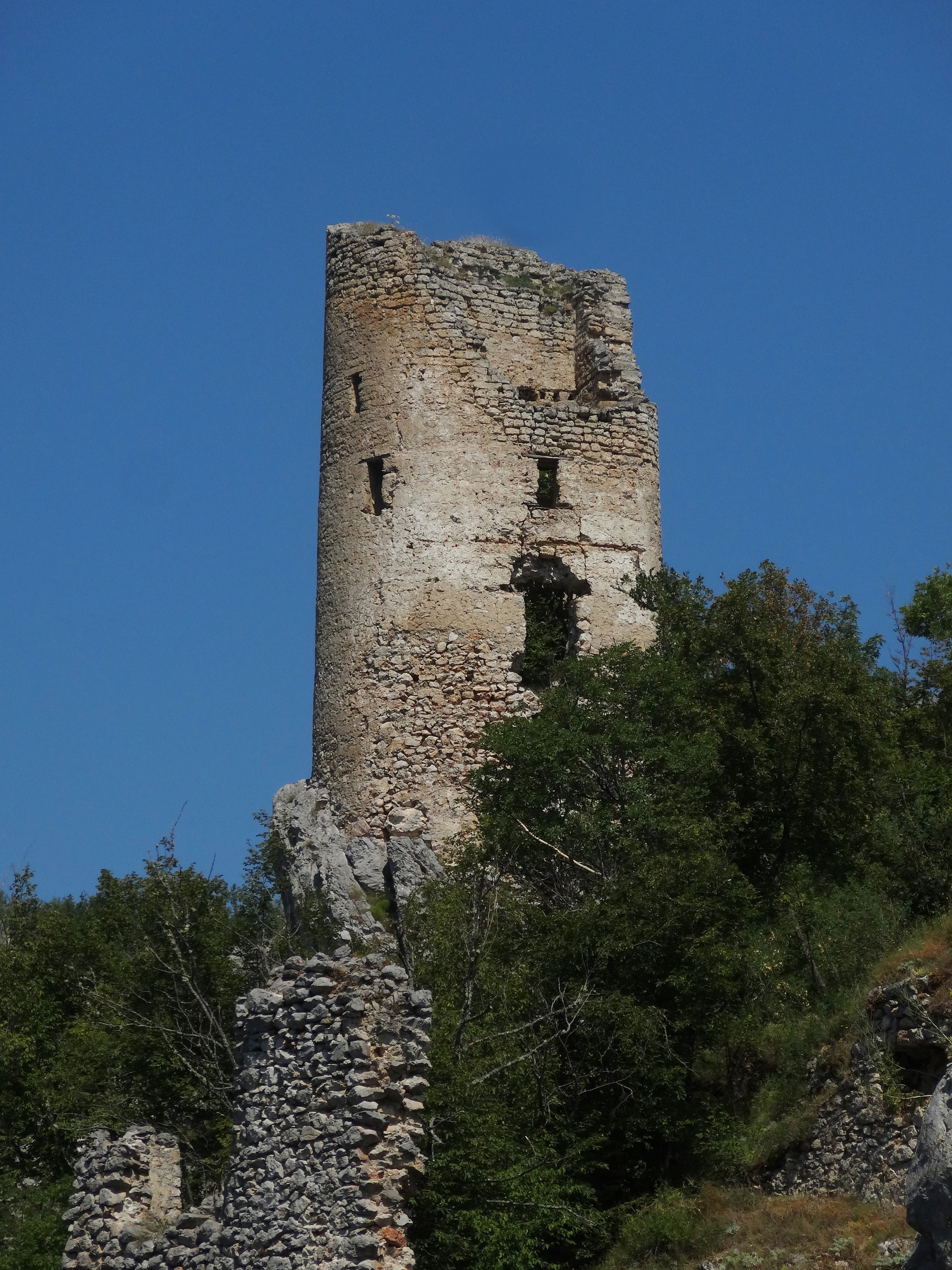

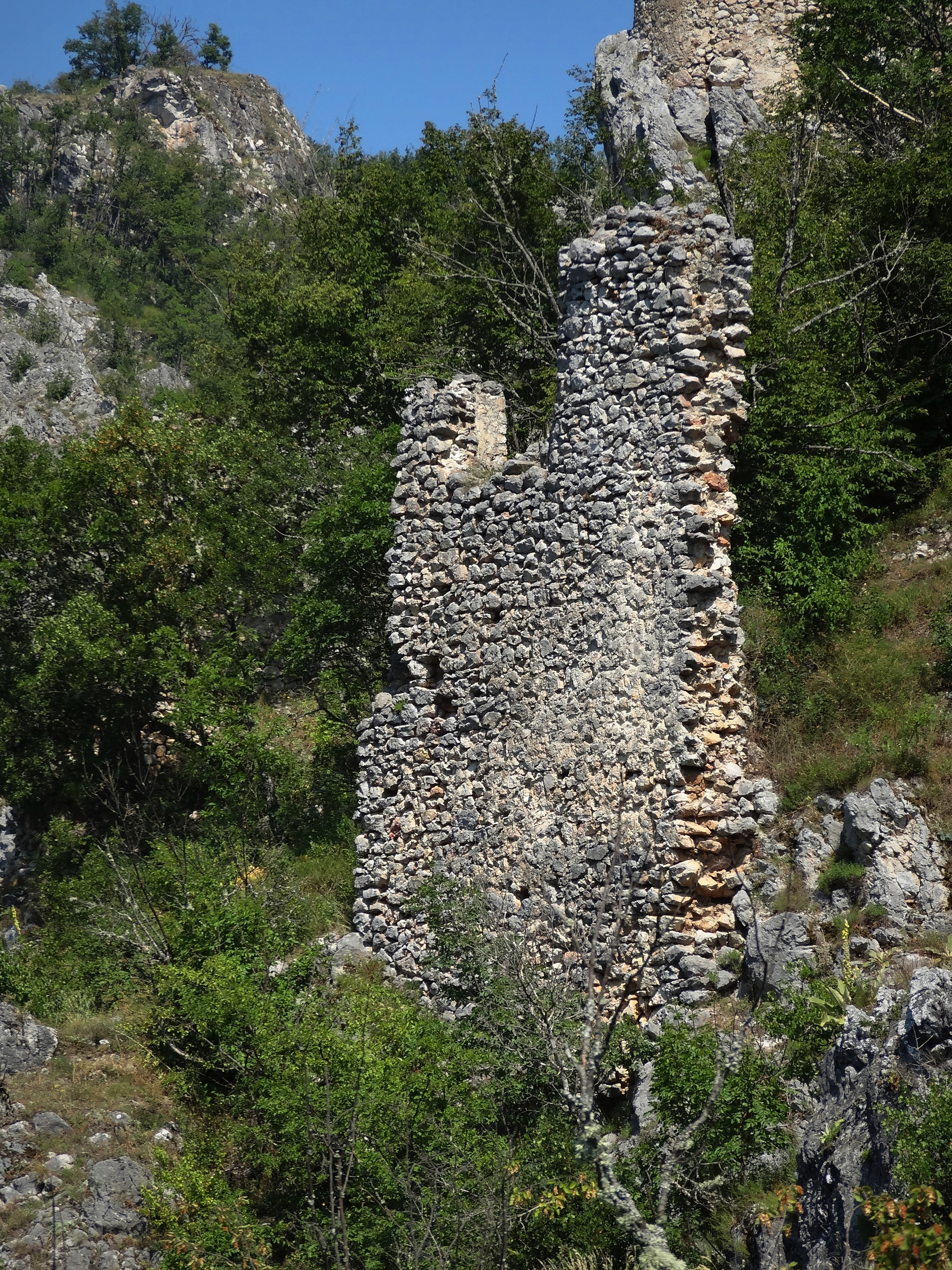

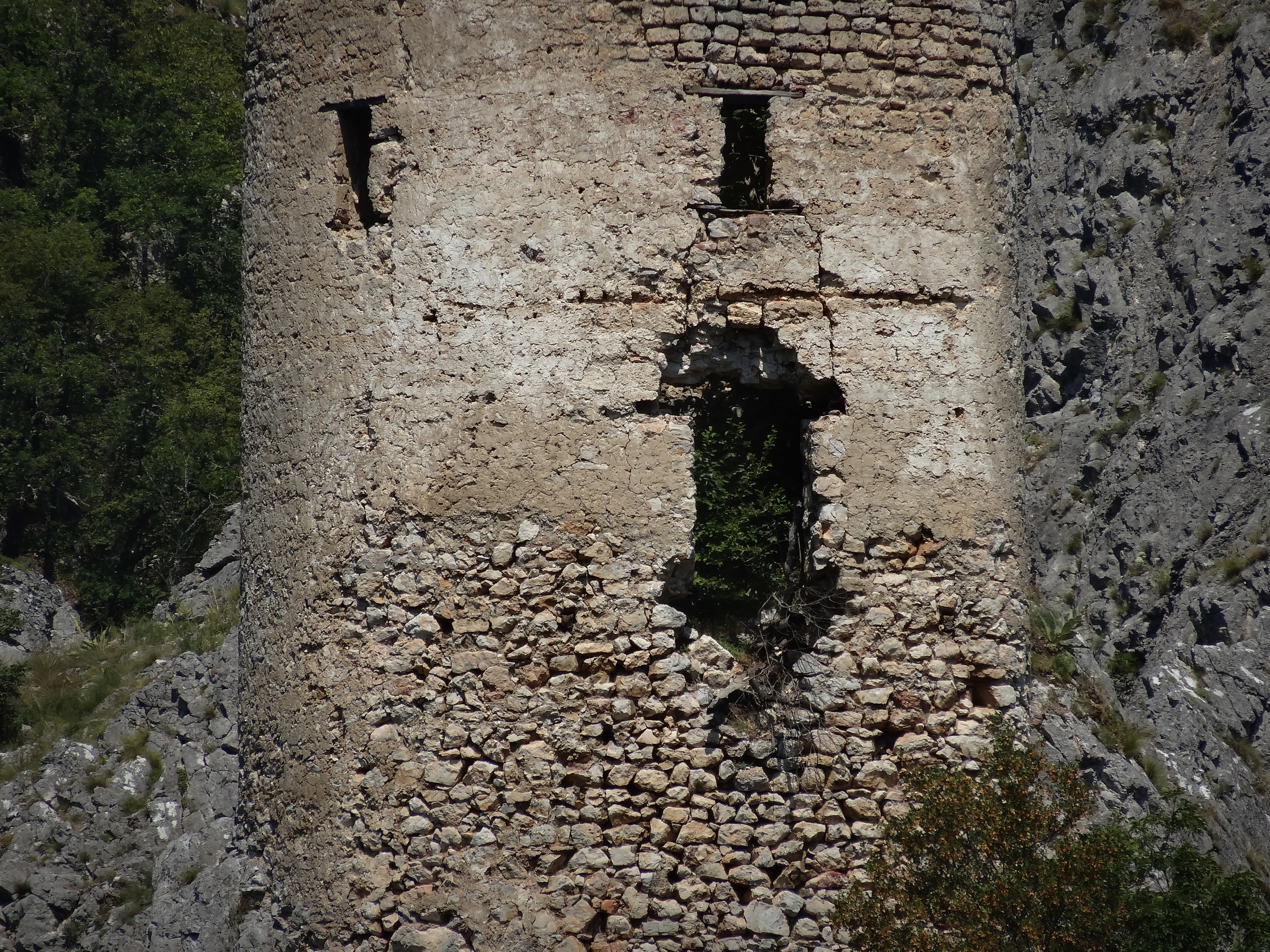

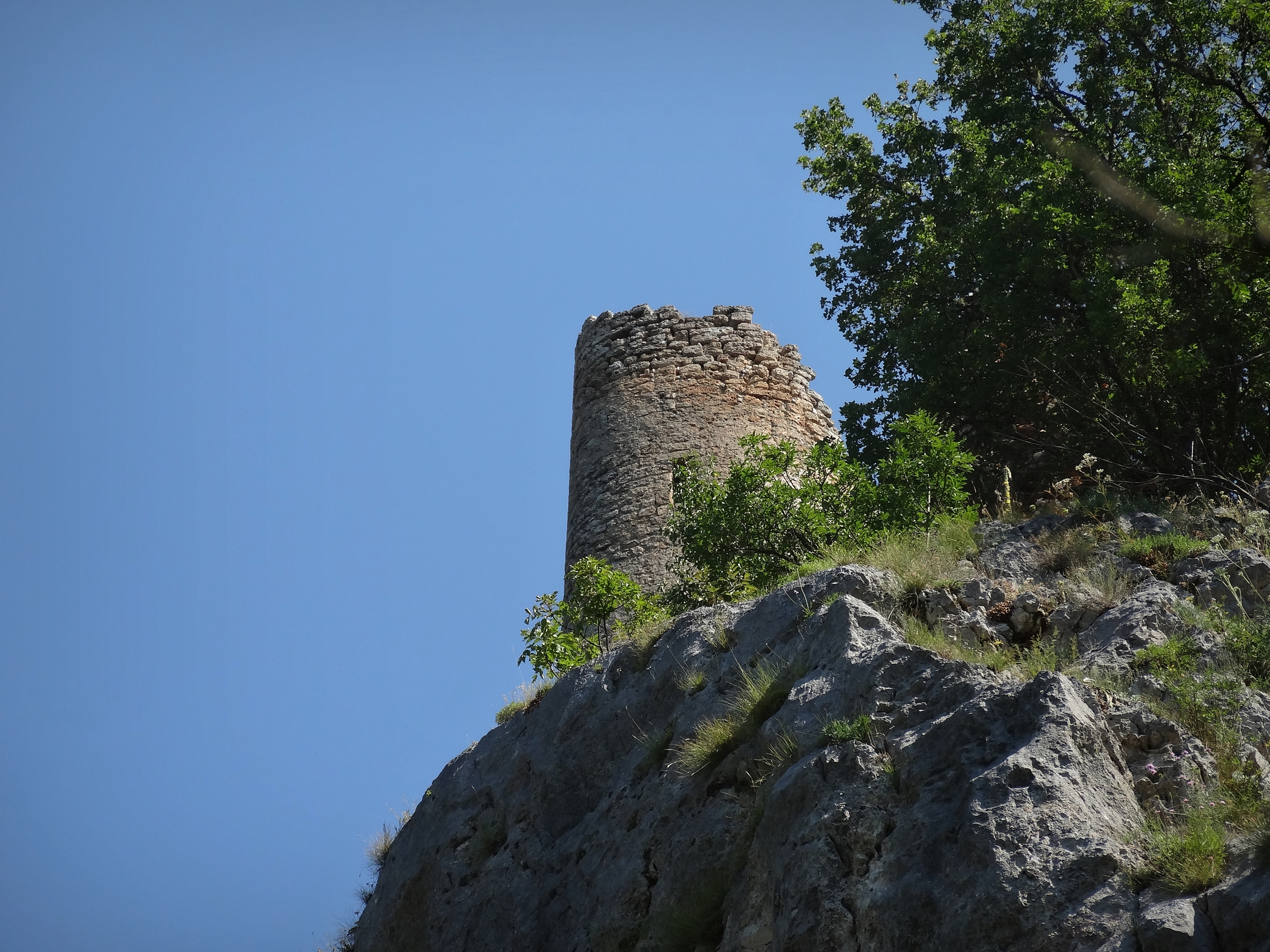

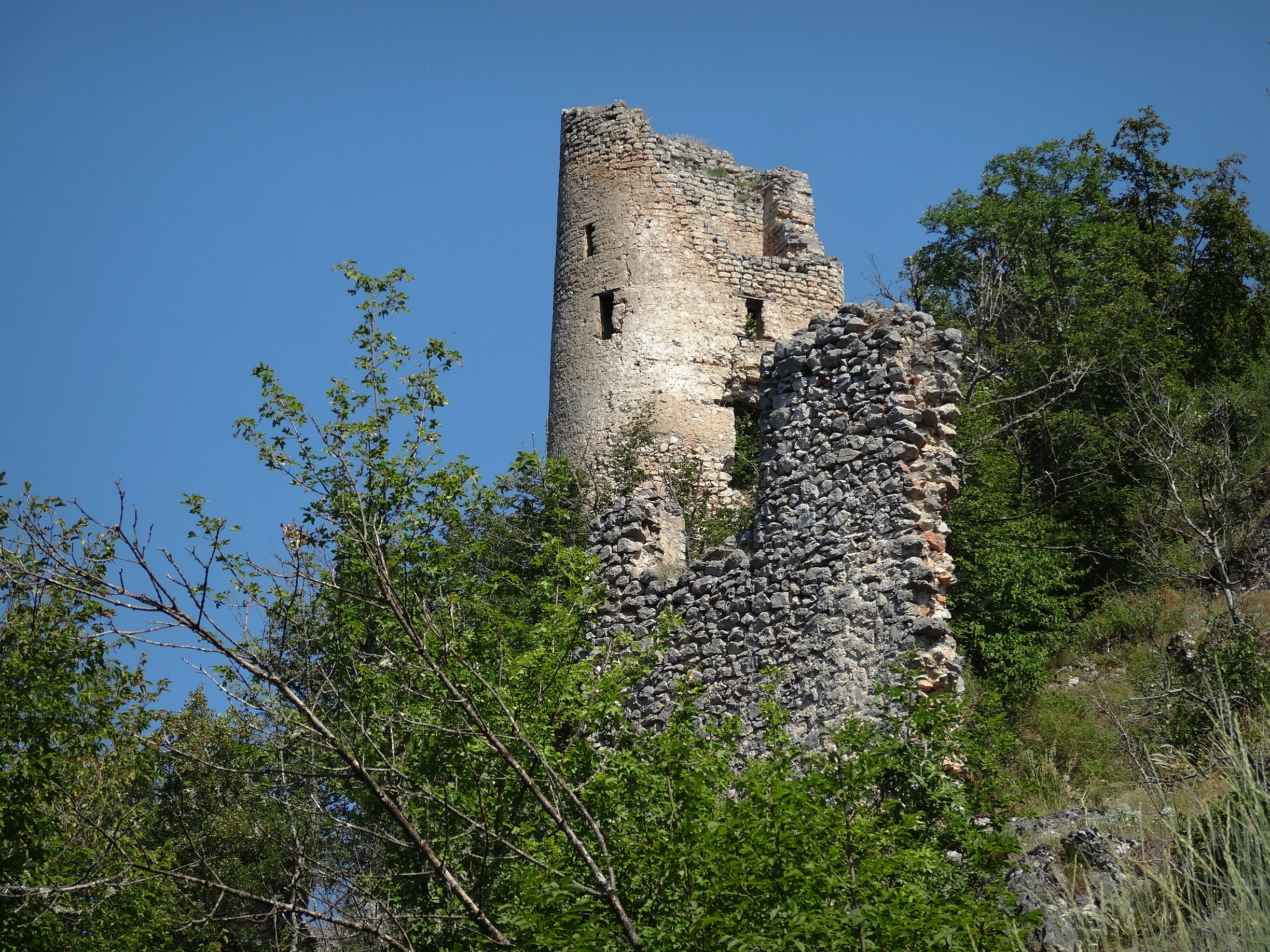

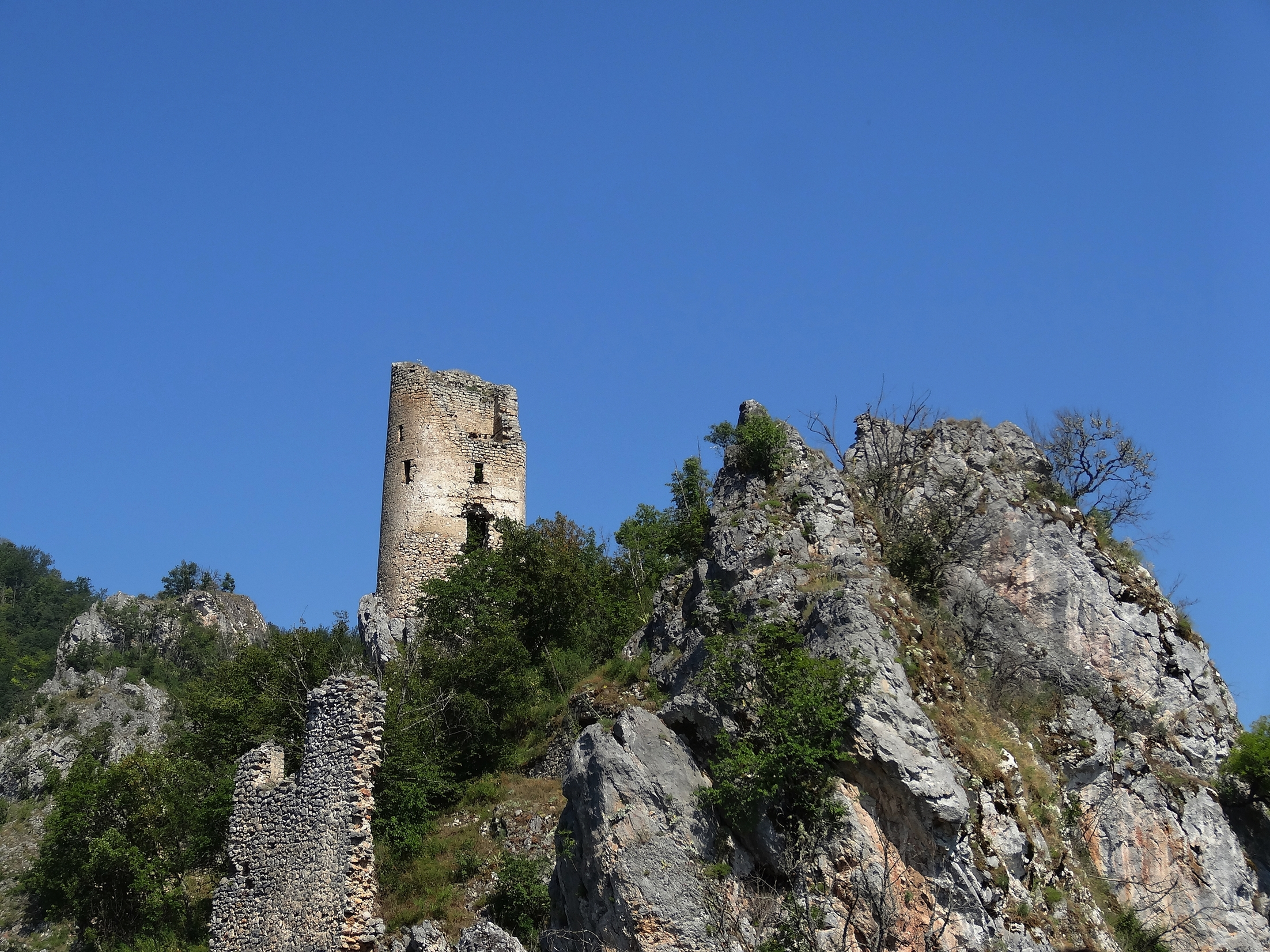

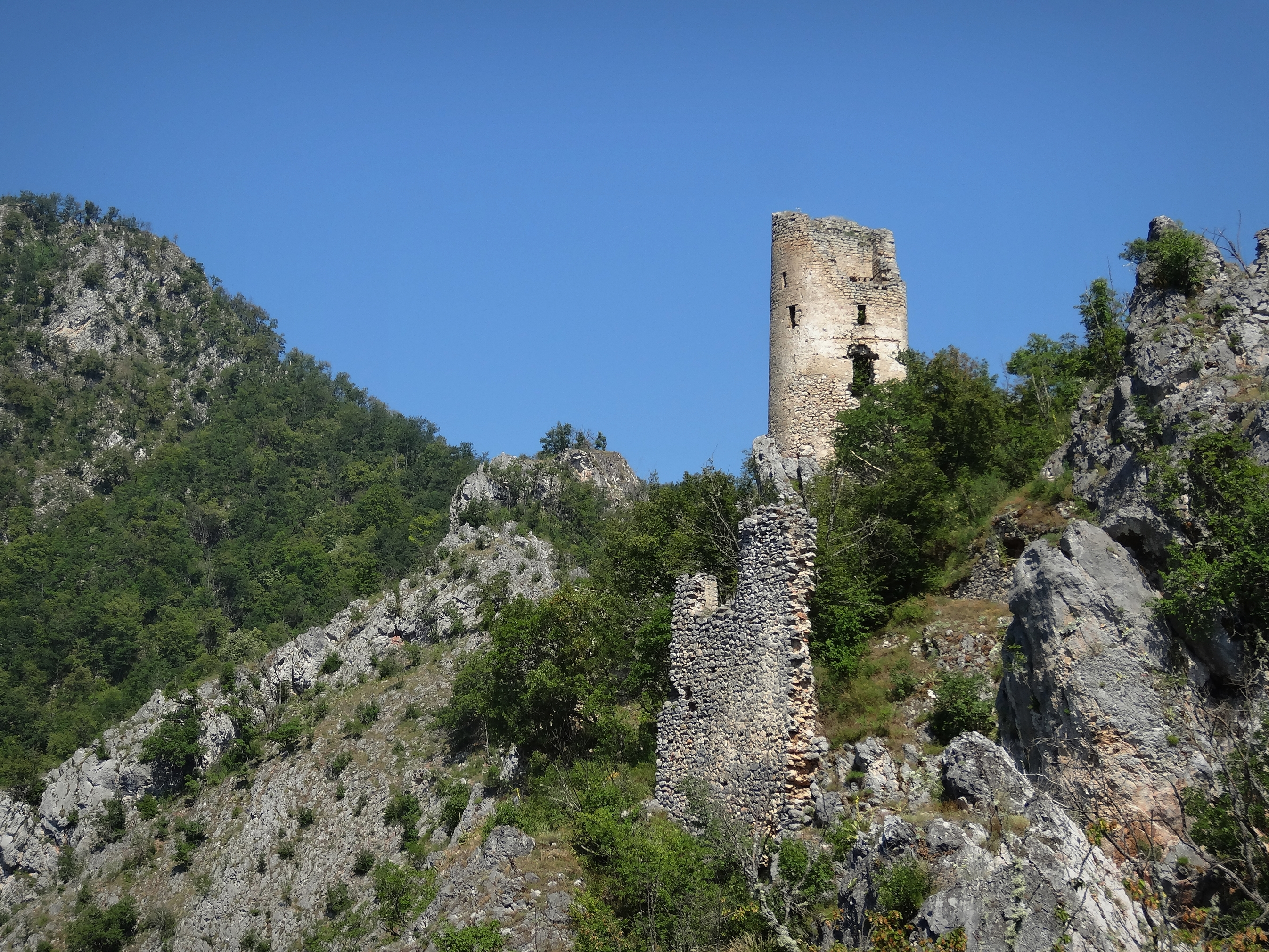

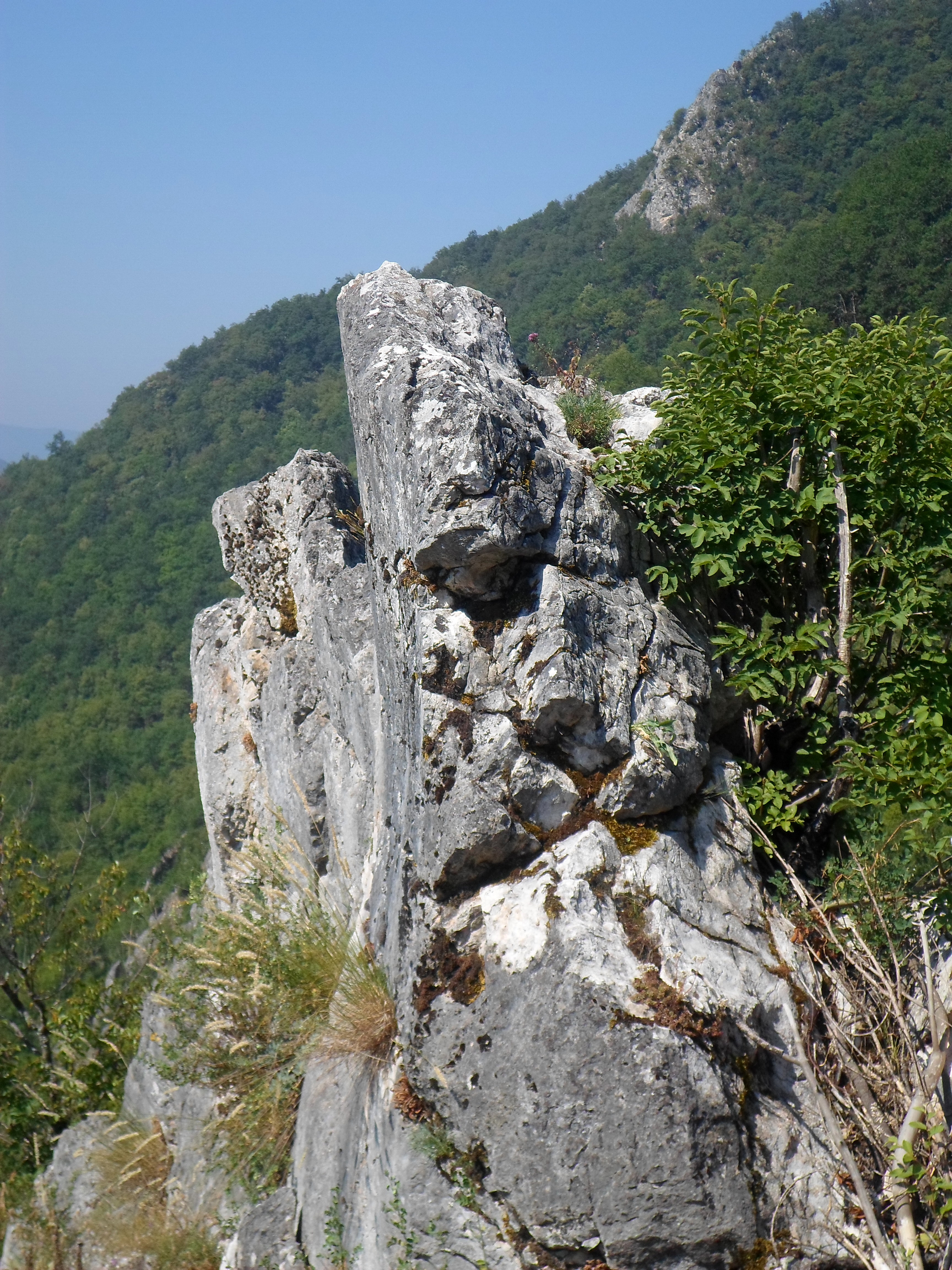

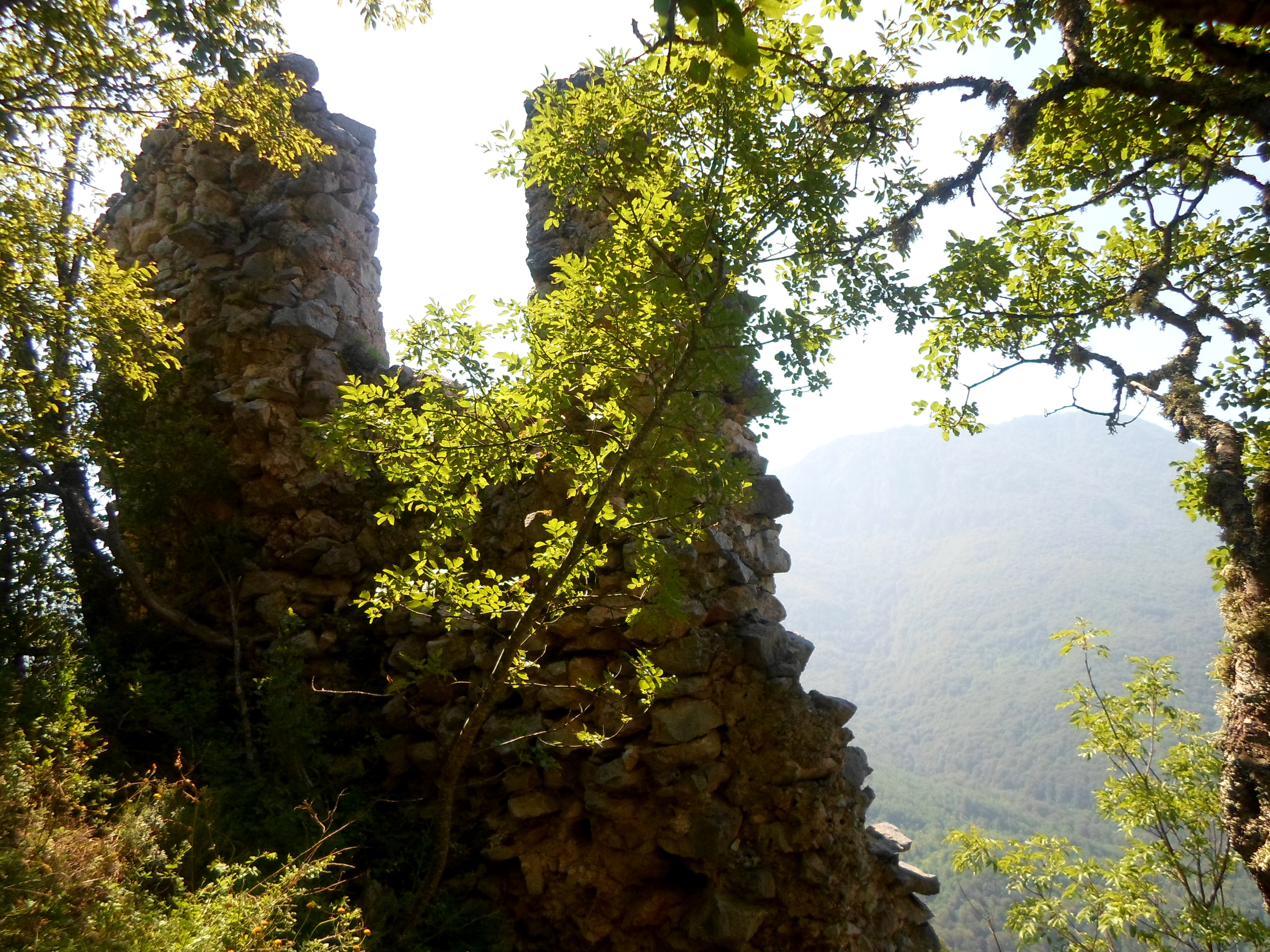

== See also ==
- Ključ Fortress
- Walled town of Počitelj

== Sources ==
- Службени гласник БиХ, број 60/08
- Стари град Самобор на сајту Племенито
- Марко Вего, Насеља босанске средњовековне државе. Свјетлост, Сарајево, 1957
- Шефик Бешлагић, Стећци, каталошко-топографски преглед. Сарајево, 1971
- Група аутора, Извјештај о претходним истраживањима, У: Горње Подриње у доба Косача. Међурепублички научноистраживачки пројекат, Извјештај за 1973. годину. Завод за заштиту споменика културе Босне и Херцеговине, Сарајево, 1973
- Десанка Којић-Ковачевић, Архивско-историјска истраживања горњег Подриња, У: Дрина у доба Косача, Наше старине, 14—15, Сарајево, 1981
- Ћирковић, Сима (1964а). Историја средњовековне босанске државе. Београд: Српска књижевна задруга.
- Ћирковић, Сима (1964). "Сугуби венац: Прилог историји краљевства у Босни". Зборник Филозофског Факултета У Београду. 8 (1): 343–370.
- Ћирковић, Сима (1964в). Херцег Стефан Вукчић-Косача и његово доба. Београд: Научно дело.
- Šabanović, Hazim (1959). Bosanski pašaluk: Postanak i upravna podjela. Sarajevo: Naučno društvo Bosne i Hercegovine.
- Bejtić, Alija (1942). "Jedan srednjovekovni grad na Drini kod Goražde". Narodna Uzdanica : Kalendar Za Godinu 1943. XI. Sarajevo: Muslimansko kulturno društvo "Narodna uzdanica", (Sarajevo : Tiskara „Bosanska pošta“): 135–138. Archived from the original on 6 March 2023. COBISS.SR 214089223 COBISS.BIH 22110470
- Kajmaković, Zdravko (1981). "Drina u doba Kosača" (PDF). Naše starine. Sarajevo: Zemaljski zavod za zaštitu spomenika kulture i prirodnih rijetkosti Narodne Republike Bosne i Hercegovine, (Zagreb : Grafički zavod Hrvatske): 141–177. ISSN 0547-3136. COBISS.SR 57465612 (COBISS.RS 57465612) COBISS.BIH 12902146
