= Bina Štampe Žmavc =

Slovene writer, poet, director and translator

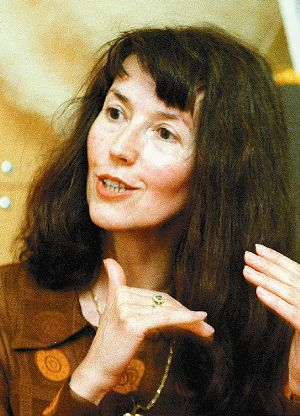
- Born: October 4, 1951 (age 73); Celje
- Occupation: writer, poet, and translator

Bina Štampe Žmavc (born October 4, 1951, in Celje) is a Slovene writer, poet, director and translator.

== Biography ==
She was born on October 4, 1951, in Celje. She visited both primary and grammar schools in Celje. After the grammar school she studied comparative literature and literary theory at the Faculty of Arts in Ljubljana. As a graduate she employed herself in the field of education and taught for five years. She occupied herself with music and theatre as well. She was the leader of the infant improvisational theatre at Experimental Theatre Celje for 13 years, where she was director, stage manager and the author of texts. She is a member of the editorial board of the magazine Poetikon. Nowadays she is considered a classic of Slovene juvenile literature. She lives and works in Celje.

== Work ==
She writes poems, prose and theatre plays, mostly for young readers. She started publishing poetry for adults in the grammar school's gazette named Brstiči, later on in Dialogi, Mentor and Obrazi as well. She has written three poetical collections of sonnets, namely Pesek v pesmi, Poševno sonce and Opoldnevi. Among the poetical collections, Čaroznanke (1990) is the largest one; their motivation has the origin in everyday life as well as reality and experiences of imagination. In the collection Nebeške kočije (1994) the author is focusing on the themes of universe, in which everything is connected, the themes of human being and nature; with her collection Klepetosnedke (1996) she returns to a child and his/her playful relation to the surroundings. Among the prose work we can find animal stories (Slike in zgodbe iz tisoč in enega pasjega dne, 1985) and various short fairy tales and nonsense texts (Popravljalnica sanj, 1992, Muc Mehkošapek, 1998). A characteristic of her juvenile poetry is a rich poetical language. The poet invents new words, her poems are rhythmic. Moreover, imaginary words are typical of her juvenile prose. She also writes plays and puppet show works for children and chansons for adults.

== Bibliography ==
=== Poetry for young people ===
- Čaroznanke, 1990 COBISS 18185984
- Nebeške kočije, 1994 COBISS 44446208
- Zrnca sonca, 1994 COBISS 44373504
- Klepetosnedke, 1996 COBISS 40523521
- Duhec Motimir, 2002 COBISS 120537856
- Škrat s prevelikimi ušesi, 2002 COBISS 116690944
- Snežroža, 2006 COBISS 229002240
- Vaze, 2008 COBISS 237033472
- Roža v srcu, 2010 COBISS 252850688
- Pol sonca, 2011 COBISS 253373184

=== Prose for young people ===
- Slike in zgodbe iz tisoč in enega pasjega dne, 1985 COBISS 503070
- Popravljalnica sanj, 1992 COBISS 31300864
- Kam je izginil sneg, 1993 COBISS 33579264
- Popravljalnica igrač, 1994 COBISS 243959040
- Mavricij in lučka Svečana, 1994 COBISS 45583104
- Ure kralja Mina, 1996 COBISS 61163008
- Vejak, 1997
- Bajka o svetlobi, 1997 COBISS 69944064
- Muc Mehkošapek, 1998 COBISS 69944576
- Pismonoša Hubert, 1998 COBISS 71515392
- Tri zvezde za celjske kneze, 2000 COBISS 107385600
- Drevo srca, 2001 COBISS 55098881
- Ukradene sanje, 2001 COBISS 113454592
- Škrat s prevelikimi ušesi, 2002 COBISS 116690944
- Pogašeni zmaj, 2003 COBISS 125582336
- Živa hiša, 2004 COBISS 248019968
- Vprašanja srca, 2008 COBISS 61909505
- Cesar in roža, 2009 COBISS 255108608
- Košastka Katka, 2009 COBISS 244497408
- Kako raste leto, 2010 COBISS 65392129
- Snežnosek, 2010 COBISS 64067585

=== Plays for young people ===
- O velikem strahu Buholinu, 1985
- Cirkus Cigumigus, 1994
- Ure kralja Mina, 2000 COBISS 61163008
- Princesa kamnitih besed, 2000
- Ernica gosenica, 2000
- O petelinu in pavu, 2001 COBISS 114514688
- Mojca Pokrajculja, 2002 COBISS 119836672

=== Poetry for adults ===
- Pesek v pesem, 1999 COBISS 43354113
- Poševno sonce, 2001 COBISS 114515456
- Opoldnevi, 2005 COBISS 220516096
- Sinjebradec, 2007 COBISS 234930944

=== Radio plays ===
- Kam je izginil sneg, 1993
- Princesa kamnitih besed, 1996 COBISS 109890560
- Ure kralja Mina, 1996 COBISS 66068992
- O petelinu in pavu, 1997 COBISS 71661824

=== Adaptations and translations ===
- Pujs v mlaki (priredba), 1994 COBISS 50777600
- Pojdiva domov, Mali medo (priredba), 1994 COBISS 50778880
- Mesto cvetja (priredba), 1994 COBISS 46318080
- Doktor Belko (prevod), 1999 COBISS 77146368
- Ali ima tudi kenguru mamo (prevod), 2000 COBISS 115884800
- Daj mi poljubček (prevod), 2001 COBISS 111229440
- Poljubček za lahko noč (prevod), 2001 COBISS 111559680
- Zajčkova knjiga pravljic (prevod), 2001 COBISS 115804416
- Zelo osamljena kresnička (prevod), 2002 COBISS 116439296
- Zelo tih čriček (prevod), 2002 COBISS 116439808
- Ali se ne počutiš dobro, Poldek? (prevod), 2002 COBISS 118759936

== Awards ==
- Zlata Linhartova značka ZKOS za režijo in besedilo igre O velikem strahu Buholinu, 1986.
- Nagrada zlata paličica za najboljše slovensko odrsko besedilo za otroke in mladino za dramski tekst Ure kralja Mina, 1994.
- Nagrada Radia Slovenija za izvirno radijsko igro za otroke za igro Princesa kamnitih besed, 1996.
- Nagrada Radia Slovenija za izvirno radijsko igro za otroke za igro Ernica gosenica, 1997.
- Klemenčičeva nagrada za izvirno lutkovno besedilo Društva slovenskih pisateljev in festivala "Klemenčičevi dnevi" za delo Ernica gosenica, 1999.
- Mednarodna bienalna nagrada Janusz Korczak, 2. nagrada za delo Muc Mehkošapek, 2000.
- Nagrada Radia Slovenija za izvirno radijsko igro za otroke za igro O kuri, ki je izmaknila pesem, 2003.
- Nagrada desetnica za otroško in mladinsko književnost za pesniško zbirko Živa hiša, 2007.
- Nagrada večernica za delo Cesar in roža, 2009.
- Nagrada desetnica za najboljše otroško in mladinsko delo za zbirko pravljic Cesar in roža, 2011.

== Sources and literature ==
- Cankarjeva založba, Leksikon slovenska književnost, Ljubljana, 1996
- A. Lutar Ivanc, Album slovenskih književnikov, MK, Ljubljana 2006
- Alenka Kepic Mohar, Šolski album slovenskih književnikov, MK, Ljubljana, 2007
- Bina Štampe Žmavc, Snežroža, Celje, 2007
- Bina Štampe Žmavc
- Wikipedija- Bina Štampe Žmavc
