= Tone Kralj =

Slovene sculptor and painter

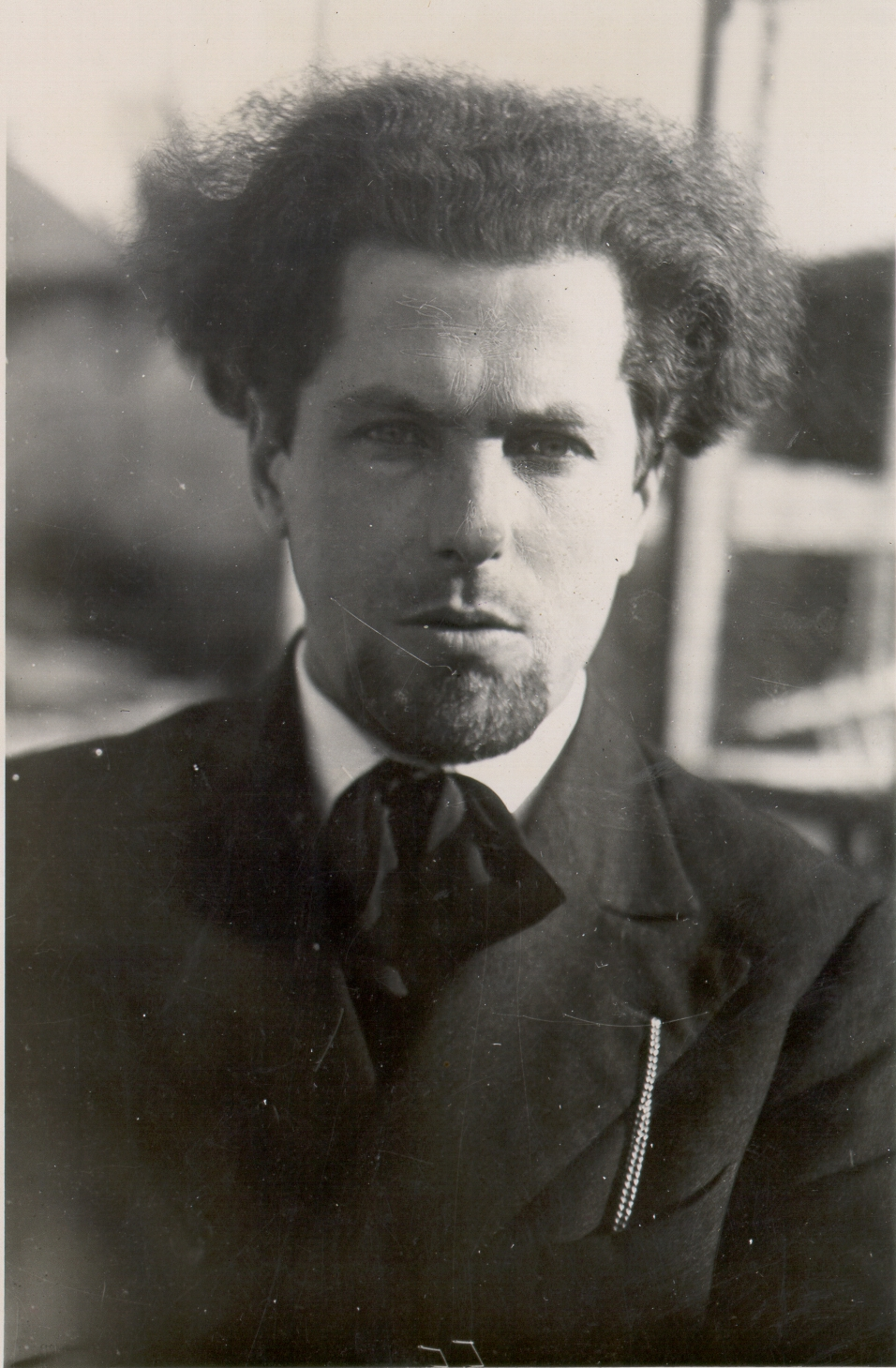
- Born: 23 August 1900; Zagorica, Slovenia
- Died: 9 September 1975; Ljubljana, Slovenia
- Education: Prague, Vienna
- Known for: painting, sculpture
- Notable work: Painting, murals, sculpture and illustration
- Awards: Levstik Award; 1950 for Pravljica o carjeviču Jeruslanu; Prešeren Award; 1972 for his lifetime achievement

Tone Kralj (23 August 1900 – 9 September 1975) was a Slovene sculptor and painter also known for his wall paintings and illustrations.

Kralj was born in Zagorica near Dobrepolje in Lower Carniola in 1900. He studied sculpture in Prague between 1920 and 1923 and then in Vienna, Paris, and Venice. Some of his best-known works are the wall paintings in various churches. His 1954 illustrations for Fran Levstik's Martin Krpan are also some of the most iconic images for the story. He won the Levstik Award in 1950 for his illustrations for Pravljica o carjeviču Jeruslanu (The Story of Prince Jeruslan). He died in Ljubljana in 1975.

In 1972 he received the Prešeren Award for his life's work.
