= Marlenka Stupica =

Slovene children's book illustrator (1927–2022)

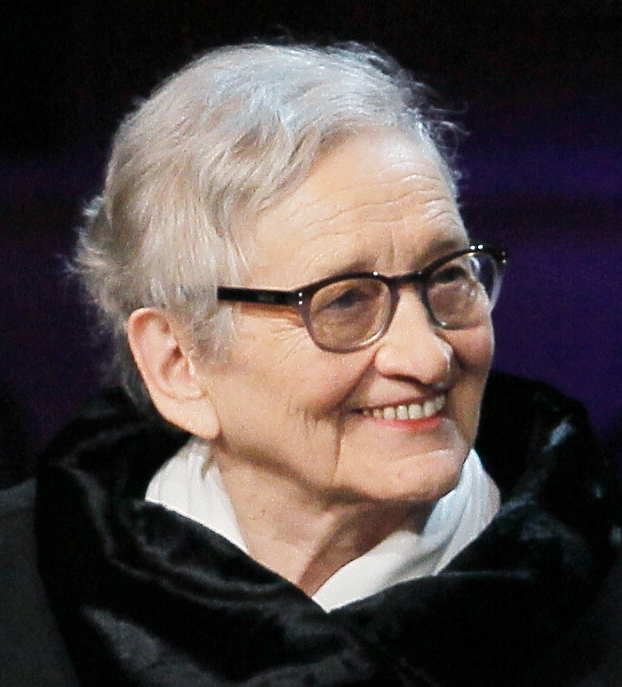
- Stupica in 2013
- Born: Marlenka Muck; 17 December 1927; Maribor, Kingdom of Serbs, Croats and Slovenes
- Died: 17 June 2022 (aged 94); Ljubljana, Slovenia
- Education: Academy of Fine Arts, Ljubljana, 1946/47
- Known for: Drawing, illustrating
- Notable work: Children's books illustrations
- Awards: Prešeren Foundation Award; 1972 for achievements in illustration Levstik Award; 1999 for lifetime achievement Prešeren Award; 2013 for lifetime achievement

Marlenka Stupica (née Muck; 17 December 1927 – 17 June 2022) was a Slovene children's book illustrator. She illustrated over one hundred books for children and is considered one of the top Slovene illustrators.

== Life and work ==
Stupica was born as Marlenka Muck in Maribor, Kingdom of Serbs, Croats and Slovenes on 17 December 1927. She studied at the Academy of Fine Arts in Ljubljana, People's Republic of Slovenia, Federal People's Republic of Yugoslavia, where she graduated in 1950. At that time, she also travelled to numerous European countries. She already illustrated as a student. Overall, she illustrated over one hundred children's books in her life, and also worked as a commercial designer and a puppet scenographer. She exhibited in Tokyo, Bratislava, Bologna, and Rome. Her favourite motifs were landscape, water, trees and sky. She illustrated fairy tales by Brothers Grimm, Hans Christian Andersen, Astrid Lindgren, and Ela Peroci, among others. Her daughter Marija Lucija Stupica was also an acclaimed illustrator.

== Death ==
She died in Ljubljana on 17 June 2022 at the age of 94

== Awards ==
In 1972, Stupica won the Prešeren Foundation Award for her achievements in children's book illustration. She also won the Levstik Award for her illustrations a record six times, in 1950, 1952, 1954, 1959, 1960 and 1970, as well as the same award for lifetime achievement in illustration in 1999. In 2013, she was also bestowed the Prešeren Award for lifetime achievement.
