= Martin Krpan =

Fictional Slovenian folk hero

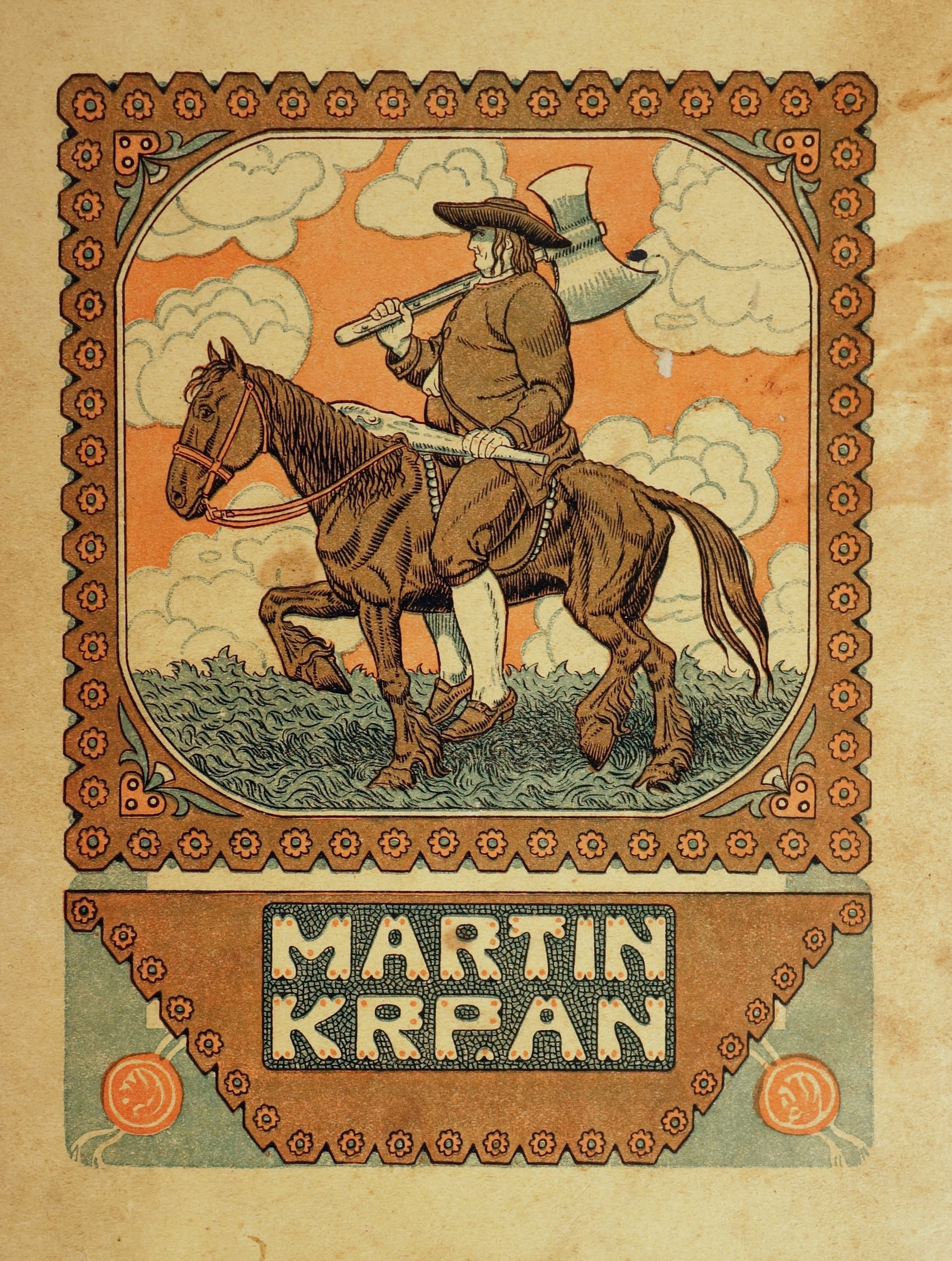
Martin Krpan, the illustration by Hinko Smrekar on the cover of the 1917 book edition

Martin Krpan is a fictional character created on the basis of the Inner Carniolan oral tradition by the 19th-century Slovene writer Fran Levstik in the short story Martin Krpan from Vrh pri Sveti Trojici (Slovene: Martin Krpan z Vrha pri Sveti Trojici). Published in 1858 in the literary journal, Slovenski glasnik, the story's popularity led it to become a part of Slovene folklore and made its lead character a folk hero.

== The story ==
A Slovene subject of the Habsburg Empire and one of the strongest men in it, Martin Krpan hails from a fictional village in Inner Carniola, Hilltop by the Holy Trinity [church] (Vrh pri Sveti Trojici). A smuggler by profession, he makes a living by illegally transporting "English salt" (perhaps a euphemism for a constituent of gunpowder, a laxative, or a smelling salt (Note: The exact nature of this substance is a matter of dispute: it might have been potassium nitrate (saltpeter), magnesium sulfate or ammonium carbonate.)). With the help of his loyal, diminutive mare, they transport the "salt" from the Adriatic coast throughout the Slovene Lands and Inner Austria. On one of his trips, after Krpan meets the imperial carriage on a snowbound road and makes way for it by simply picking up his laden horse and moving it aside, his extraordinary strength is noted by Emperor John (cesar Janez). Several years later, the Emperor summons Krpan to Vienna as his last hope against Brdaus (Slovene: Brdavs), a brutal warrior who has set up camp outside the imperial capital and issued a challenge to single combat, and has already slain most of the city's knights, including the Crown Prince. Reluctantly, Krpan accepts the challenge, scandalizing the court with his uncouthness, honesty and homespun manner before defeating the brute in a duel by using not only his strength but an unexpected reserve of ingenuity. In gratitude, the Emperor bestows him with a pouch of gold pieces and a royal license to legally traffic "English salt," as well as an offer of his daughter's hand in marriage.

== Figural representations ==
Martin Krpan carrying his horse. Book cover illustration by Tone Kralj, 1954.

The story of Martin Krpan as rendered by Levstik in his epic story was first illustrated in 1917 by Hinko Smrekar. Today, Smrekar's illustrations are mainly known from the images on tarot playing cards.

In 1954, the expressionist painter Tone Kralj created a series of large full-page color illustrations of the story. His picture book, reprinted thirteen times, is now the most recognisable image of Martin Krpan.

Krpan is often depicted carrying his mare, a reference to in an iconic scene from the story in which he moves his horse to make way for the imperial carriage.

== Translation in foreign languages ==
- English: Martin Krpan, 2014 ISBN 86-11-16762-7
  - Martin Krpan (picture book), 2017 ISBN 978-86-11-16762-6
- Esperanto: Martin Krpan z Vrha, 1954 COBISS 1305908
- Croatian: Martin Krpan, 1986 COBISS 6132537
- Italian: Martin Krpan, 1983 COBISS 6129721
- Hungarian: Martin Krpan, 1963 COBISS 1857764
- Macedonian: Martin Krpan, 1965 COBISS 1702771
- German: Martín Krpán, 2004 ISBN 961-6512-26-9
- Russian: Martin Krpan : slovenskaja narodnaja povest, 2011 ISBN 978-961-6803-21-2
- Slovak: Martin Krpan z Vrhcu, 1950 COBISS 3477363
- Serbian: Martin Krpan, 1962 COBISS 13140025
- Belarusian. Marcin Krpan, 1982 COBISS 29470976
- Swedish: Martin Krpan från Vrh, 2004 ISBN 91-975443-0-2
- Multilingual: Martin Krpan, 2015 ISBN 978-961-281-480-9
