= Marija Lucija Stupica =

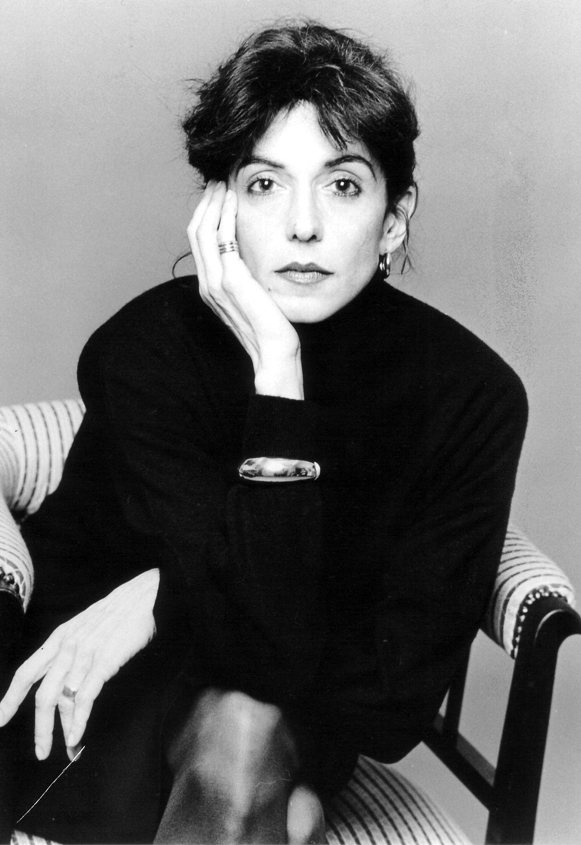
- Born: 13 December 1950; Ljubljana, Slovenia
- Died: 28 May 2002 (aged 51); Ljubljana, Slovenia
- Education: Academy of Fine Arts, Ljubljana
- Known for: Painting, drawing, illustrating
- Notable work: Painting and children's books illustrating
- Awards: Prešeren Foundation Award; 1989 for her book illustrations Levstik Award; 1973 for Kraljična na zrnu graha Levstik Award; 1983 for Leteči kovček and Regica in Skokica; Levstik Award; 1985 for Pastirica in dimnikar

Marija Lucija Stupica (13 December 1950 – 28 May 2002) was a Slovene children's book illustrator.

== Biography ==
Stupica was born in Ljubljana in 1950. She was the daughter of the acclaimed Slovene illustrator Marlenka Stupica and famous painter Gabrijel Stupica. Her father often used her as a model for his paintings.

She studied at the Academy of Fine Arts in Ljubljana.

She won the Prešeren Foundation Award in 1989 for her achievements in children's book illustration. She also won the Levstik Award for her illustrations three times, in 1973, 1983 and 1985. In 2000 she was one of the four finalists for the IBBY Hans Christian Andersen Award.

Her daughter Hana is also an artist and illustrator.
