= COBISS =

Southeastern European library network

COBISS (short for Co-operative Online Bibliographic System and Services) is an organizational model of joining libraries into a national library information system with shared cataloguing, the COBIB union bibliographic catalogue database and local bibliographic databases of participating libraries, the COLIB database on libraries, the CONOR authority database, and with a number of other functions.

== History ==
In 1987, a shared cataloguing system was adopted by the Association of the Yugoslav National Libraries as a common ground for the library information system and the system of scientific and technological information of Yugoslavia. It connected 55 libraries across former Yugoslavia. In 1991, IZUM promoted COBISS as an upgrade of the shared cataloguing system. At that time, the same acronym started to be used also for the related software. As a result of Yugoslavia's disintegration, the libraries outside Slovenia resigned from the membership in the shared cataloguing system, although almost all of them later on gradually renewed the collaboration with IZUM, and are at present building their own autonomous information systems based on the COBISS platform with shared cataloguing in the COBISS.net network. The agreement on the establishment of the COBISS.net network and the free exchange of bibliographic records between the autonomous library information systems of Bosnia and Herzegovina, Montenegro, North Macedonia, Slovenia, and Serbia, was signed in 2003. In 2006, the aforementioned agreement was also signed in the name of Bulgarian libraries by the Bulgarian National Library.

== See also ==
- List of libraries in Bosnia and Herzegovina
- List of libraries in Serbia
- List of libraries in Slovenia
