= St. Mark's Church (Vrba) =

Coordinates: 46°23′15.78″N 14°8′55.15″E

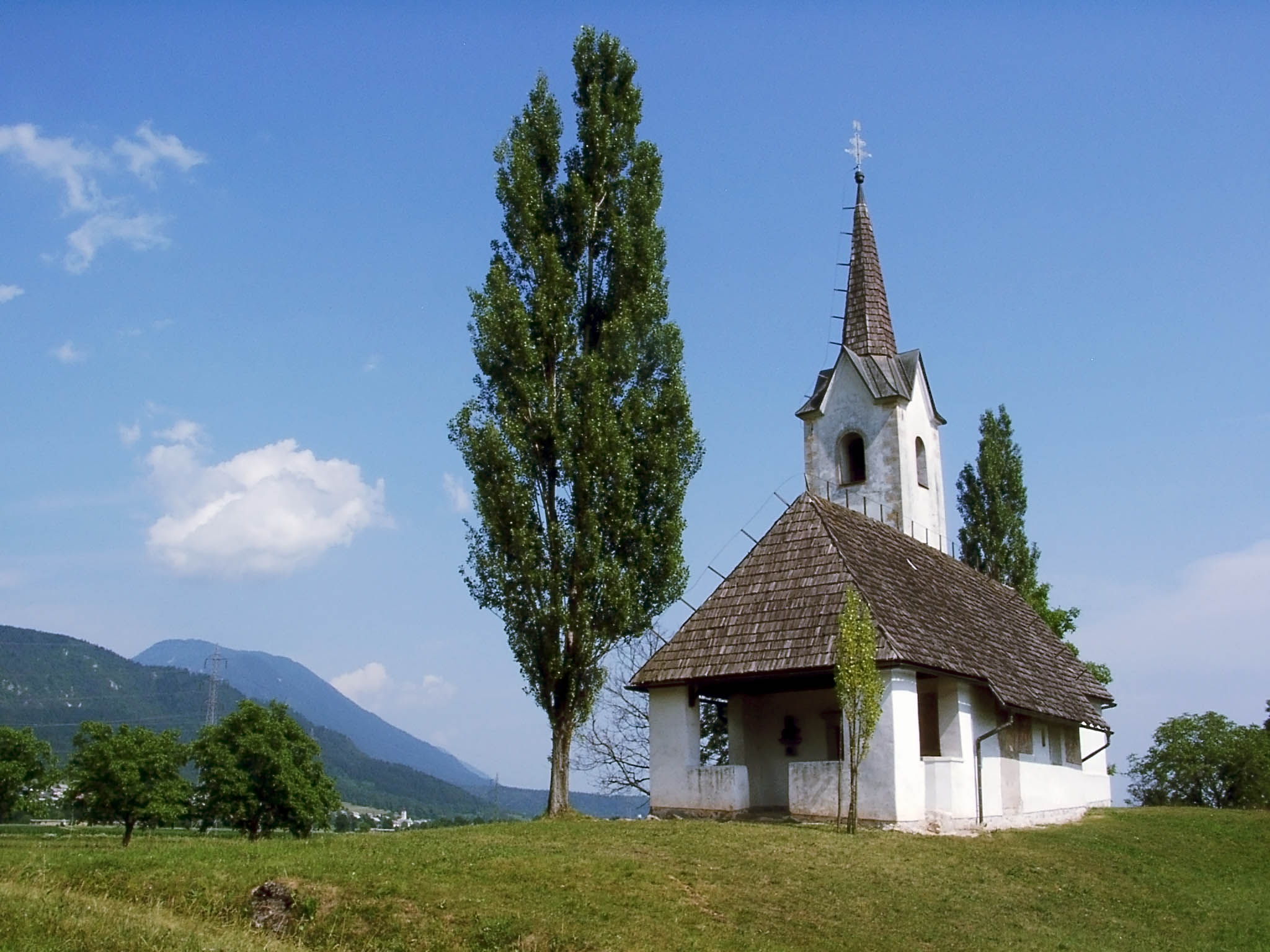
St. Mark's Church in Vrba

St. Mark's Church (cerkev svetega Marka) is a small church on the outskirts of the village of Vrba in Upper Carniola in Slovenia. Despite being a modest and unprepossessing building, St. Mark's Church is widely known in Slovenia due to its appearance in O Vrba, one of the best-known sonnets of the Slovene national poet France Prešeren. Though it is only mentioned in the last verse of the sonnet, the church has come to symbolize the home and safety that one yearns for when the bitterness and disappointment of having followed one's destiny to foreign lands becomes too much to bear. In January 2011, the church was proclaimed cultural monument of national importance by the Government of Slovenia.

== History ==
The church is dedicated to St Mark and is a plain-looking building with a wooden roof and a variety of features from various periods. The Romanesque foundations of an apse displayed inside the church, under the floor of the present apse, show that there was a smaller church on this site before the 14th century. The first major rebuilding seems to have been undertaken in the 16th century when the choir was rebuilt with decorative, rather than structural ribbed vaulting. As indicated by the date 1627 on the rear portal, the steeple and the entry porch were rebuilt. The belltower would at the time have had an onion dome wooden roof—the current pyramidal roof is from the 19th century.

== Features ==
An important feature of the church are its frescoes, though they are rather fragmented. Some wall paintings are preserved on the exterior of the church. An image of St Christopher and one of the Crucifixion date to the early 15th century and are in the style of the Gorizia school. St George and the Dragon, dating to the 16th century, are by the painter Jernej of Loka who also painted the church of St John the Baptist at Lake Bohinj. Both painters also painted parts of the interior. The Gorizia master is the author of the image of Christ, the Twelve Apostles and the symbols of the Evangelists. On the right side of the dividing arch a different contemporary painter depicted St Mark kneeling and a flayed St Bartholomew holding his skin in his hand and smiling. Above the arch an image of an angel from an Annunciation scene is preserved and is the work of Bartholomew of Loka, who also decorated the western wall with scenes from the Passion of Christ, a few of which are preserved.

The church furnishings are more recent. Two gilded side altars are from the early 17th century with slightly crude 17th-century sculpture and 19th-century paintings of the Pietà and of St Bartholomew. The main altar dates to the 18th century. The marble altar table was designed by Tone Bitenc, a pupil of Jože Plečnik, and combines Baroque elements with Plečnik-style modernism.

On the basis of fragments of a painted wooden ceiling dating from around 1500–1515, a new reconstructed ceiling was built in 1990. In the porch is a bust of Archbishop Anton Vovk (1900–1963), the great-grandnephew of Prešeren, born in the same house in Vrba.
