= Oton Župančič =

Slovene poet, translator, and playwright

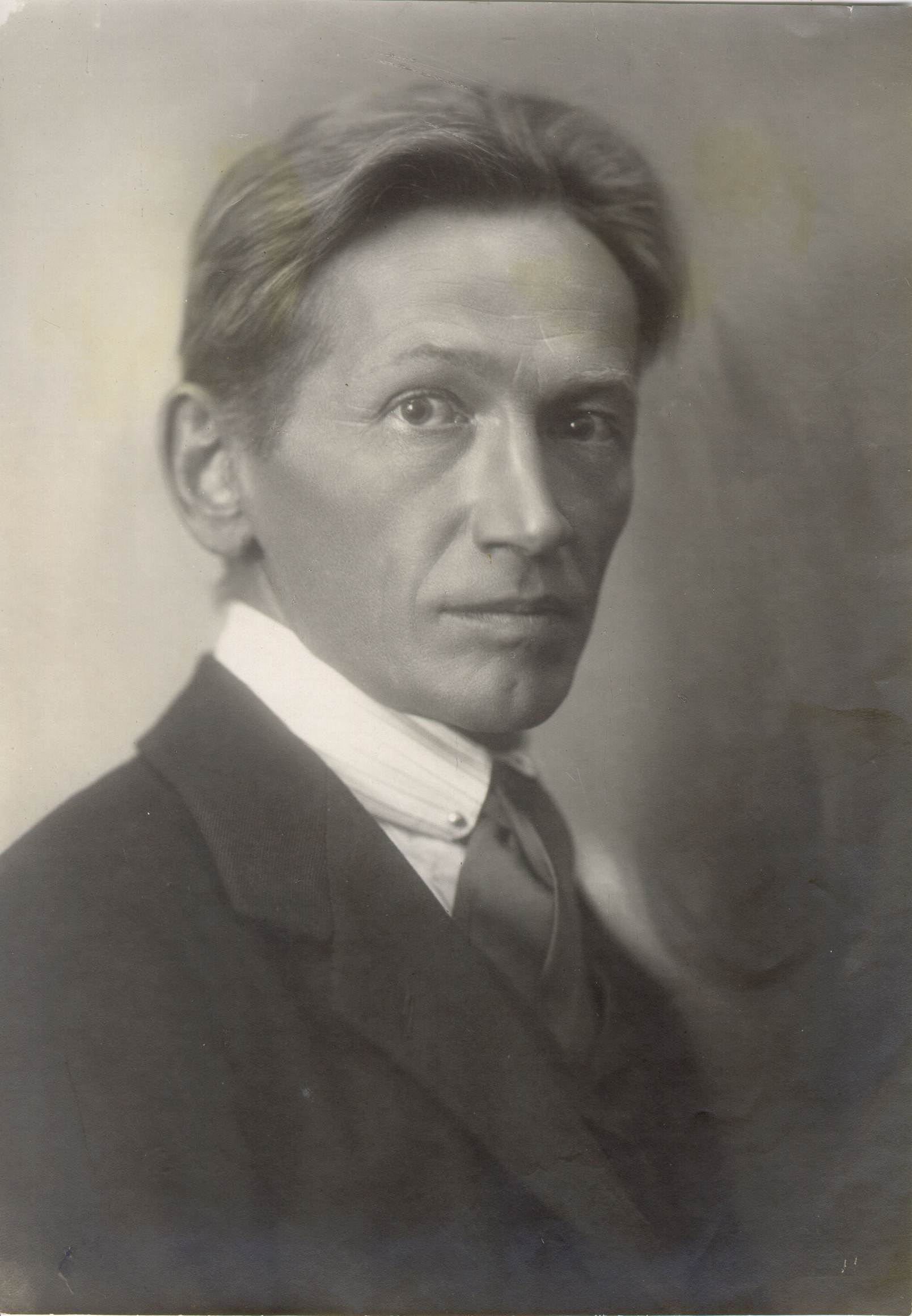
- Born: January 23, 1878 Vinica, Duchy of Carniola, Austria-Hungary (now in Slovenia)
- Died: June 11, 1949 (aged 71) Ljubljana, SR Slovenia, SFR Yugoslavia
- Occupation: Poet; translator; playwright
- Genre: plays, epic poetry, lyrical poetry
- Literary movement: Symbolism, Modernism

Oton Župančič (pronounced [ˈoːtɔn ʒuˈpáːntʃitʃ]; January 23, 1878 – June 11, 1949; pseudonym Gojko [ˈɡóːjkɔ]) was a Slovene poet, translator, and playwright. He is regarded, alongside Ivan Cankar, Dragotin Kette and Josip Murn, as the beginner of modernism in Slovene literature. In the period following World War I, Župančič was frequently regarded as the greatest Slovenian poet after Prešeren, but in the last forty years his influence has been declining and his poetry has lost much of its initial appeal.

== Biography ==
He was born Oton Zupančič in the village of Vinica in the Slovene region of White Carniola near the border with Croatia. His father Franc Zupančič was a wealthy village merchant, his mother Ana Malić was of Croatian origin. He attended high school in Novo Mesto and in Ljubljana. In the Carniolan capital, he initially frequented the circle of Catholic intellectuals around the social activist, author and politician Janez Evangelist Krek, but later turned to the freethinking circle of young Slovene modernist artists, among whom were Ivan Cankar, Dragotin Kette and Josip Murn. In 1896, he went to study history and geography at the University of Vienna. He stayed in Vienna until 1900, but never completed his studies. In the Austrian capital, he became acquainted with the contemporary currents in European art, especially the Viennese Secession and fin de siècle literature. He also met with Ruthenian students from eastern Galicia who introduced him to Ukrainian folk poetry, which had an important influence on Župančič's future poetic development.

In 1900, he returned to Ljubljana, where he taught as a substitute teacher at the Ljubljana Classical Gymnasium. He started to publish his poetry in the liberal literary magazine Ljubljanski zvon, where he clashed with one of its editors and the most influential Slovene author of that time, Anton Aškerc. In 1905, he traveled to Paris and settled in Germany, where he worked as a private tutor until 1910. In 1910, he returned to Ljubljana and worked as a stage director at the Drama Theater of Ljubljana. In 1912, the national liberal mayor of Ljubljana Ivan Tavčar employed him as the director of the City Archive, a post previously occupied by Župančič's former opponent, Anton Aškerc. The following year, 1913, he married Ana Kessler, daughter of the socialite Marija Kessler and sister of the poet Vera Albreht, who was married to the author Fran Albreht. In 1920, he returned to his previous job as a stage director and later manager of the Drama Theater.

During the Italian Fascist and Nazi German partition and annexation of Slovenia in World War II, Župančič sympathized with the Liberation Front of the Slovenian People and wrote poems under different pseudonyms for underground communist journals. After the end of the war in 1945, he was given several honorary positions and awards. During that period, he was dubbed "the people's poet." He died in Ljubljana on June 11, 1949, and was buried with full honours in Žale Cemetery on June 14, in the same grave as his friends from childhood Ivan Cankar, Dragotin Kette, and Josip Murn.

His older son Marko Župančič was a renowned architect, and his younger son Andrej O. Župančič was a pathologist, anthropologist, and author.

== Work ==
Župančič published his first collection of poems in 1899 under the title Čaša opojnosti (The Goblet of Inebriation). The collection, published at the same time and by the same publisher as Cankar's controversial book Erotika (Eroticism), was a compendium of poems from Župančič's earlier periods, when he was strongly influenced by the decadent movement. The two books marked the beginning of modernism in Slovenian literature and caused a controversy. All issues of Cankar's Erotika were bought by the Ljubljana Bishop Anton Bonaventura Jeglič and destroyed, and Župančič's Čaša opojnosti was condemned by the most renowned Slovene conservative thinker of the time, the neo-thomist philosopher Aleš Ušeničnik.

Župančič's later poems showed little influence of decadentism, but remained close to a vitalist and pantheist vision of the world and nature. He gradually turned from pure subjective issues to social, national, and political concerns. Already in 1900, he published the highly influential poem Pesem mladine (The Song of Youth), on the occasion of the centenary of Prešeren's birth, written as a battle song of his generation. In his masterpiece Duma from 1908, the visions of an idyllic rural life and natural beauty are mixed with implicit images of social unrest, emigration, impoverishment, and economic decay of the contemporary agricultural society. The poems Kovaška (The Blacksmith's Song, 1910) and Žebljarska (The Nail Maker's Song, 1912) are a powerful lyrical glorification of the vital and moral strength of oppressed manual workers.

The poetry collection that Župančič is best known for is the book of children's poetry Ciciban, published in 1915.

Župančič was also a prolific and talented translator. He is best known for his translations of the majority of Shakespeare's plays into Slovene, but he also translated other important authors, including Dante, Calderón de la Barca, Molière, Goethe, Balzac, Stendhal, Charles Dickens, Leo Tolstoy, Anatole France, Voltaire, George Bernard Shaw, Knut Hamsun, G. K. Chesterton, and Rostand.

Župančič also wrote two plays, Noč za verne duše (A Night for Faithful Souls, 1904) and Veronika Deseniška (Veronika of Desenice, 1924), which were staged during the time when he headed the Drama Theater in Ljubljana.

In 1940, Župančič collaborated in the production of the documentary O, Vrba, which presented the Prešeren House, where the Slovene national poet France Prešeren was born, and his home village of Vrba. The film was directed by Mario Förster and published after the war in 1945. The house was presented by Fran Saleški Finžgar, who led its arrangement into a museum, and Župančič read Prešeren's poem "O Vrba". This is a rare preserved record of his voice.

== Controversies ==
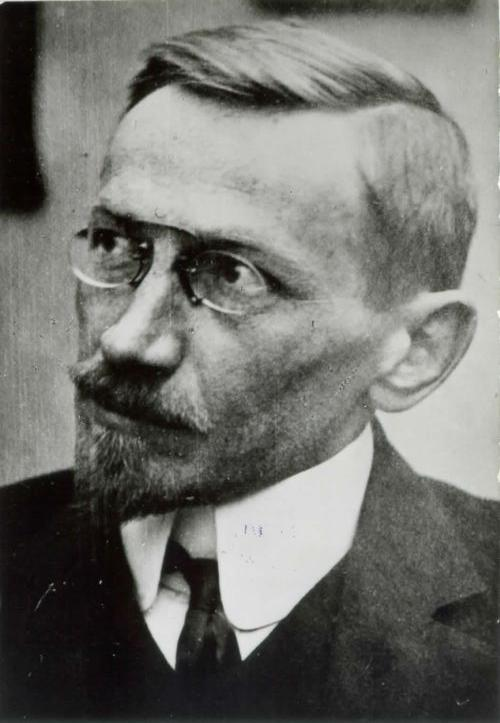
Župančič in the 1930s

Already during his lifetime, Župančič was frequently accused of being excessively pragmatic and a political opportunist. In the 1920s, he was a staunch supporter of the cultural policies of the Yugoslav monarchy, which aimed to create a unified Yugoslav nation. After 1929, he supported the centralist dictatorship of King Alexander of Yugoslavia. In 1932, he published an article in the journal Ljubljanski zvon entitled "Louis Adamic and Slovene Identity", in which he claimed that the Slovenes should not be too preoccupied about their language because they can keep their identity even if they lose the language. The article, published in a period when the Yugoslav authorities were sponsoring the official use of Serbo-Croatian in the Drava Province and when even the name Slovenia was officially banned, caused a huge controversy and a split in the journal Ljubljanski zvon. The literary critic Josip Vidmar rejected Župančič's views in his well-known polemic book The Cultural Problem of Slovene Identity.

Although Župančič remained a monarchist and Yugoslav nationalist until the invasion of Yugoslavia in April 1941, he welcomed the new communist regime after 1945.

After 2000, several interpretations of his poem "Zlato jabolko" (The Golden Apple), written in September 1943, were used in the polemic about Župančič's political position during the war and after it, precisely if he knew about the killing of around 12,000 members of the Slovenian Home Guard, an anti-communist militia that collaborated with the German army in the Summer 1945.

== Influence and legacy ==
During most of his lifetime, Župančič was regarded as a great author. He enjoyed the status of the national poet second only to France Prešeren. In 1931, the French linguist Lucien Tesnière published a book on Župančič (Oton Joupantchhitch: poète slovène. L'homme et l'oeuvre), which was important for the popularization of Župančič's poetry in France. During his lifetime, his works were only translated into French and Serbo-Croatian. Translations into German, English, Hungarian (by Sándor Weöres), Macedonian, Romanian, Bulgarian, Czech, and Slovak have been published since. Slovene composer Breda Šček set Župančič's works to music.

Župančič has had relatively little influence on the younger generations of Slovene authors. Nevertheless, many of his verses and utterances have become catchphrases or common cultural references. Today, he is still very popular as an author of children's literature. His collection of children's poetry called Ciciban (also known as Mehurčki 'Bubbles') has been published in more than 30 editions since it was first issued in 1915.

Numerous streets, public buildings, and institutions in Slovenia, Serbia (mostly in Autonomous Province of Vojvodina) as well as in Slovene-inhabited areas of Italy and Austria are named after him.

== Bibliography ==
Poetry collections:

Čaša opojnosti (The Goblet of Inebriation, 1899)
Čez plan (Over the Plain, 1904)
Samogovori (Monologues, 1908)
V zarje Vidove (In the Vitus Dawn, 1920)
Zimzelen pod snegom (The Evergreen beneath the Snow, 1945)

Children's literature:

Pisanice (Easter Eggs, 1900)
Lahkih nog naokrog (Careless Wanderings, 1913)
Sto ugank (A Hundred Riddles, 1915)
Ciciban in še kaj (Ciciban and More, 1915)

Plays:

Noč za verne duše (A Night for the Faithful Souls, 1904)
Veronika Deseniška (Veronika of Desenice, 1924)

== See also ==
- Slovenian literature
- Culture of Slovenia

== Sources ==
- Janez Mušič, Oton Župančič: življenje in delo (Ljubljana: Mladika, 2007)
- Boštjan M. Turk, Recepcija bergsonizma na Slovenskem (Ljubljana: Filozofska fakulteta Univerze v Ljubljani, 1995)
