= Vrba, Žirovnica =

Vrba
- Village
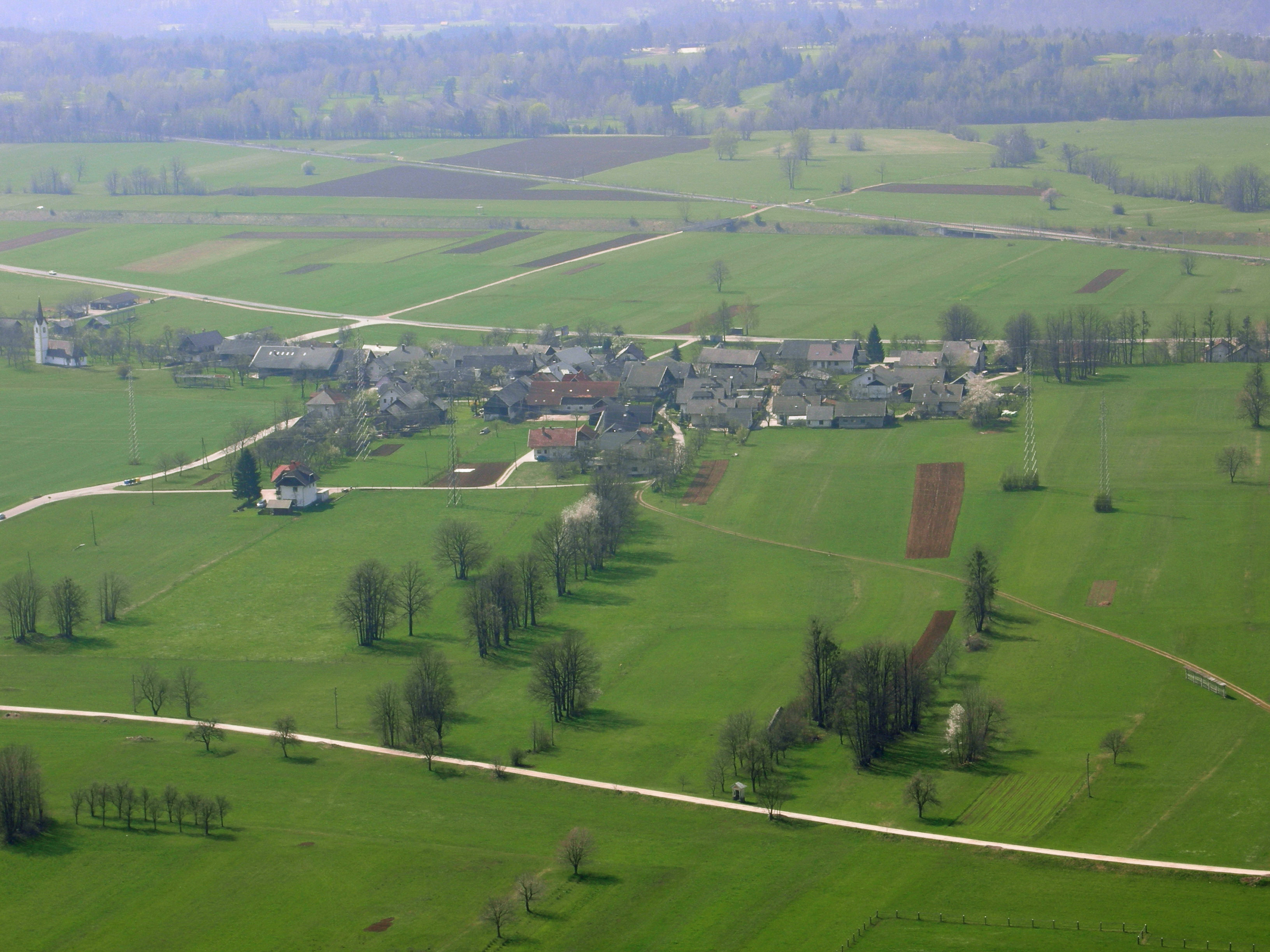
- Vrba from an airplane

- Location within Slovenia
- Coordinates: 46°23′N 14°09′E
- Country: Slovenia
- Traditional region: Upper Carniola
- Statistical region: Upper Carniola
- Municipality: Žirovnica
- First mentioned: 1247

Population (2024)
  - Total: 196

Vrba (pronounced [ˈʋə̀ɾba]; German: Velben) is one of ten villages in the Municipality of Žirovnica in the Upper Carniolan region of Slovenia. It was first mentioned in written sources from 1247 and is a typical example of a compact Alpine village. The Slovene national poet France Prešeren, who was born in the village, dedicated the sonnet "O Vrba" to the village, the first of his Sonnets of Misfortune.

== History ==
In 1940, the Prešeren House and the village were filmed for the black and white sound documentary O, Vrba. It was directed by Mario Förster and produced in 1941. Due to the communist-imposed ban on artistic productions, it was released only in 1945. The house was presented by Finžgar, and Oton Župančič read the poem "O Vrba". Due to the news about the German assault on Poland the film has a threatening atmosphere created by clouds moving over the Karawanks mountain range.

=== Mass grave ===
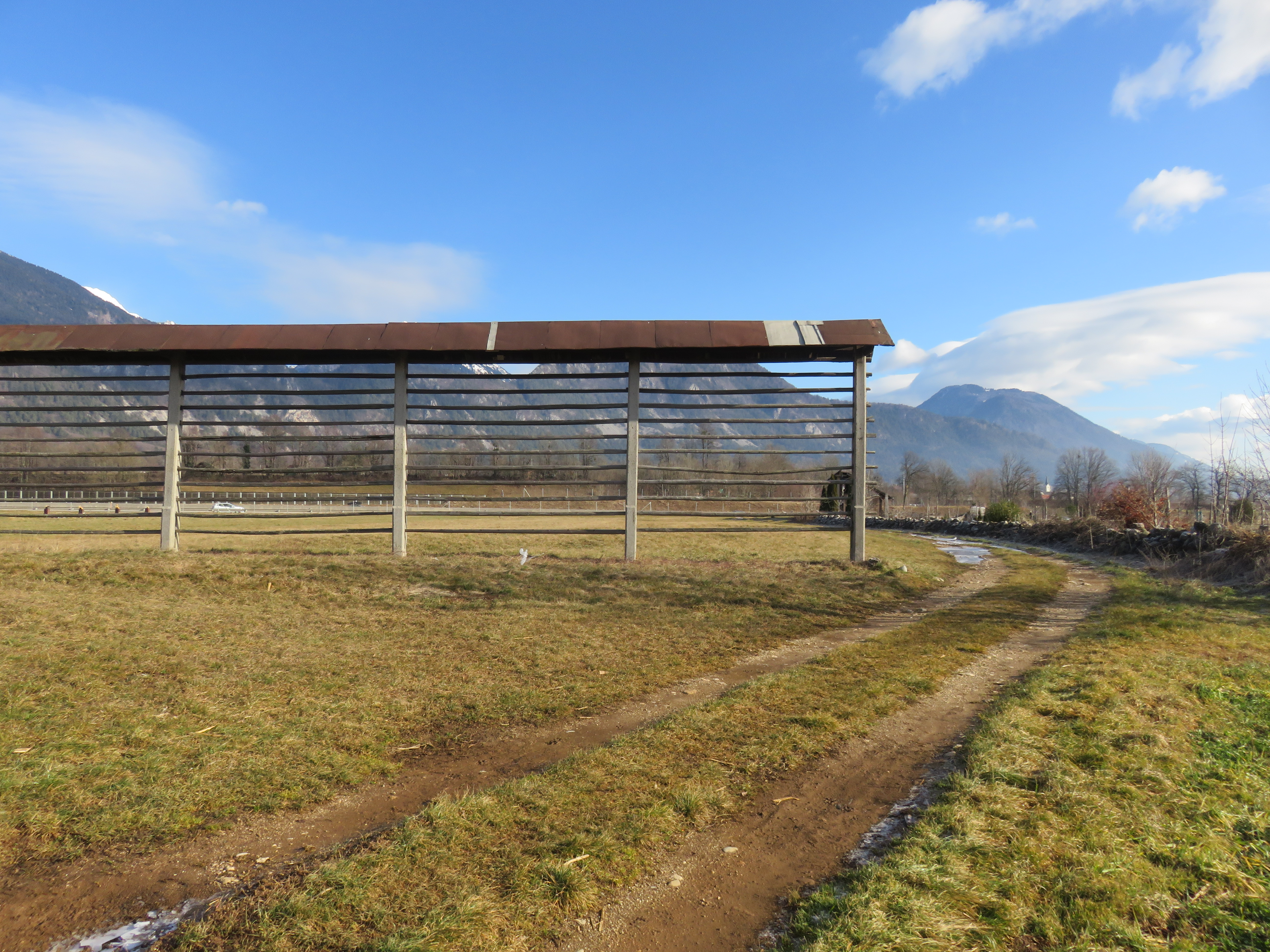
The Bele Linden Mass Grave

Vrba is the site of a mass grave associated with the Second World War. The Bele Linden Mass Grave (Slovene: Grobišče Belejeva lipa) is located in a meadow south of the settlement and west of the freeway, near a hayrack along a field road. It contains the remains of 20 people from Jesenice that were killed en route from Jesenice to Begunje na Gorenjskem.

== Church ==
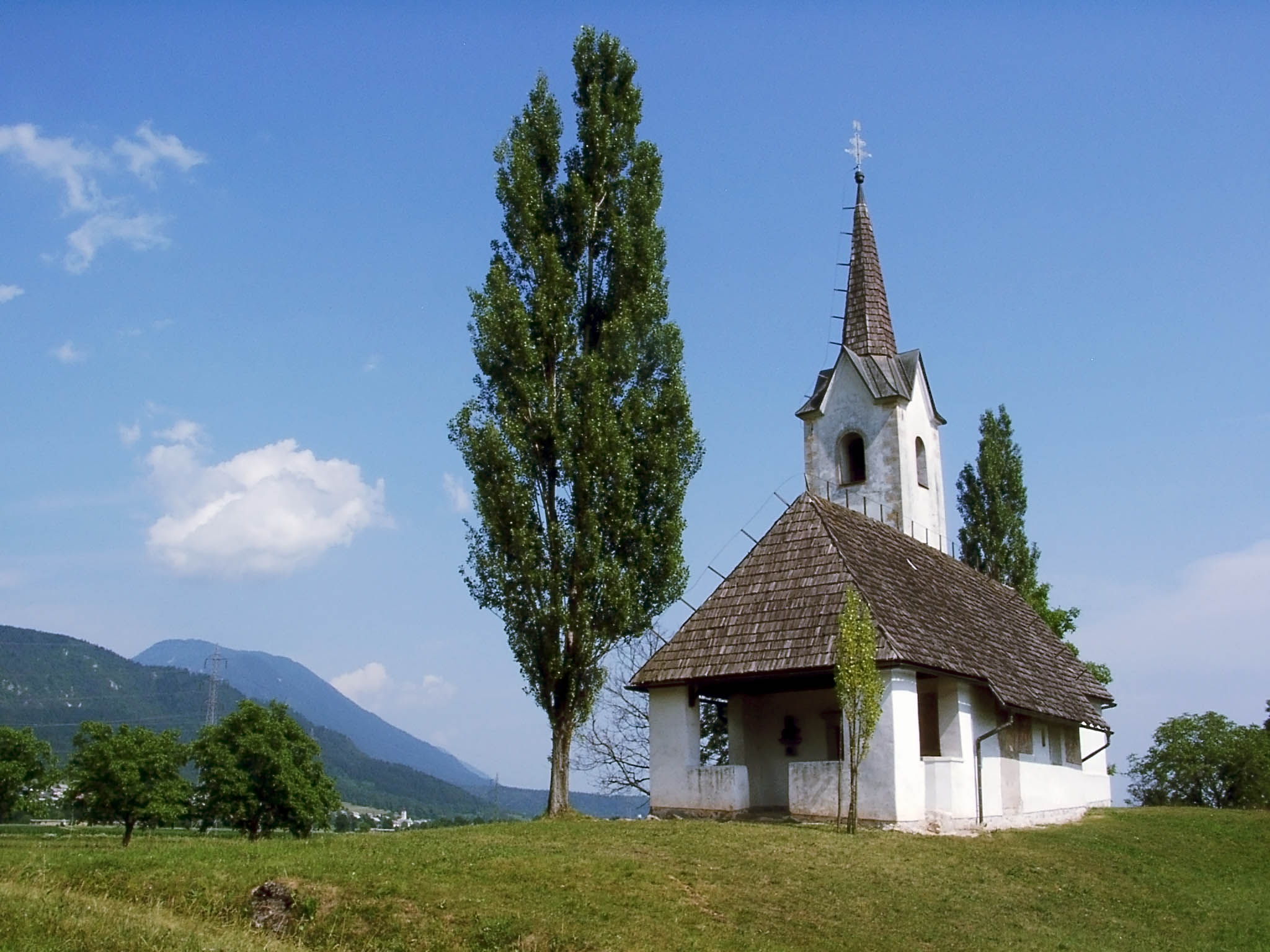
Saint Mark's Church

St. Mark's Church stands on the outskirts of the village behind the Prešeren House. It has Romanesque foundations, but the actual structure is Gothic with an interesting apse, extensive Gothic frescoes from the 15th and early 16th century on the interior walls, a renovated wooden ceiling, and two gilded Baroque altars. On the outside wall there are also relatively well-preserved frescoes of St. Christopher, the Crucifixion, and St. George fighting the dragon from the 15th century.

== Other landmarks ==
The Prešeren House, where France Prešeren and Archbishop Anton Vovk were born, is a typical example of a rural residence from the first half of the 19th century and has been in 1939 on the initiative and under the leadership of the writer Fran Saleški Finžgar arranged as a museum, dedicated to Prešeren's life and work. The museum was opened in May that year.

The linden tree, around which there are sixteen stones, in the center of the village was the meeting place of the elders of the village, who would traditionally meet under this tree to discuss village issues.

In January 2011, the Prešeren House, St. Mark's Church, and the linden tree were proclaimed cultural monuments of national importance by the Government of Slovenia.

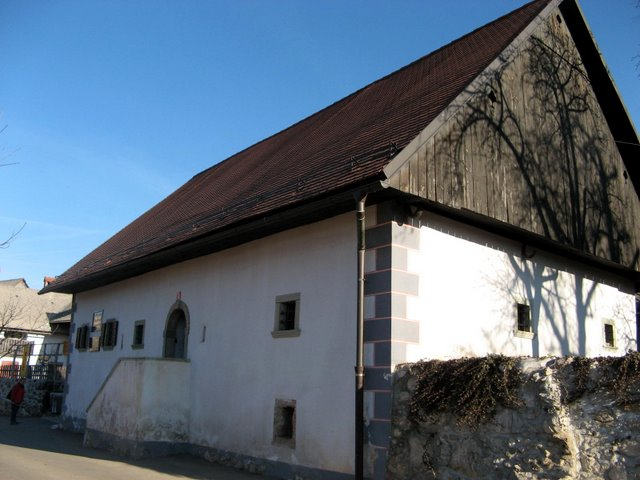
The birthplace of France Prešeren and Anton Vovk

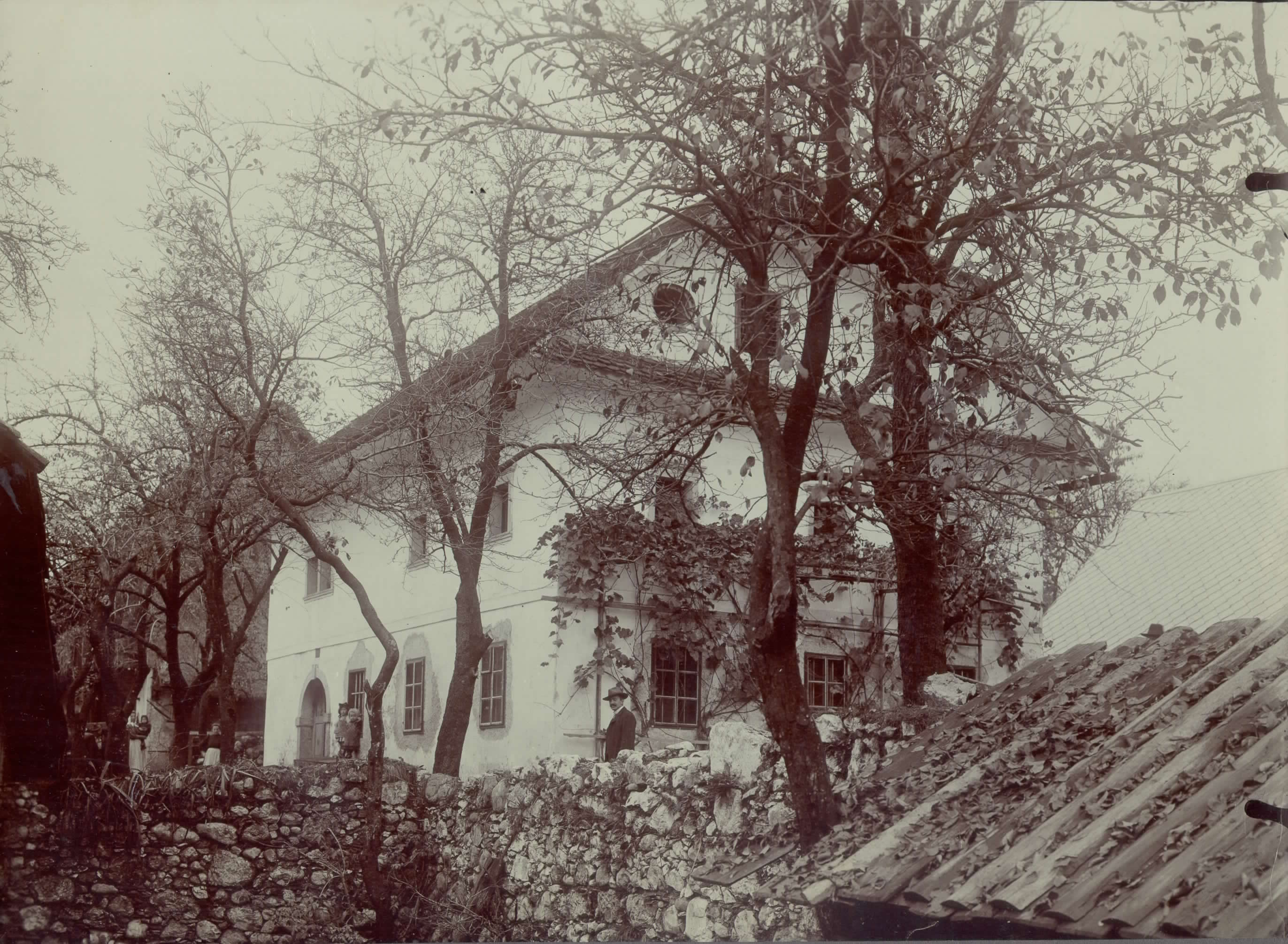
The birthplace of Janez Zlatoust Pogačar, bishop of Ljubljana (1875–1884)

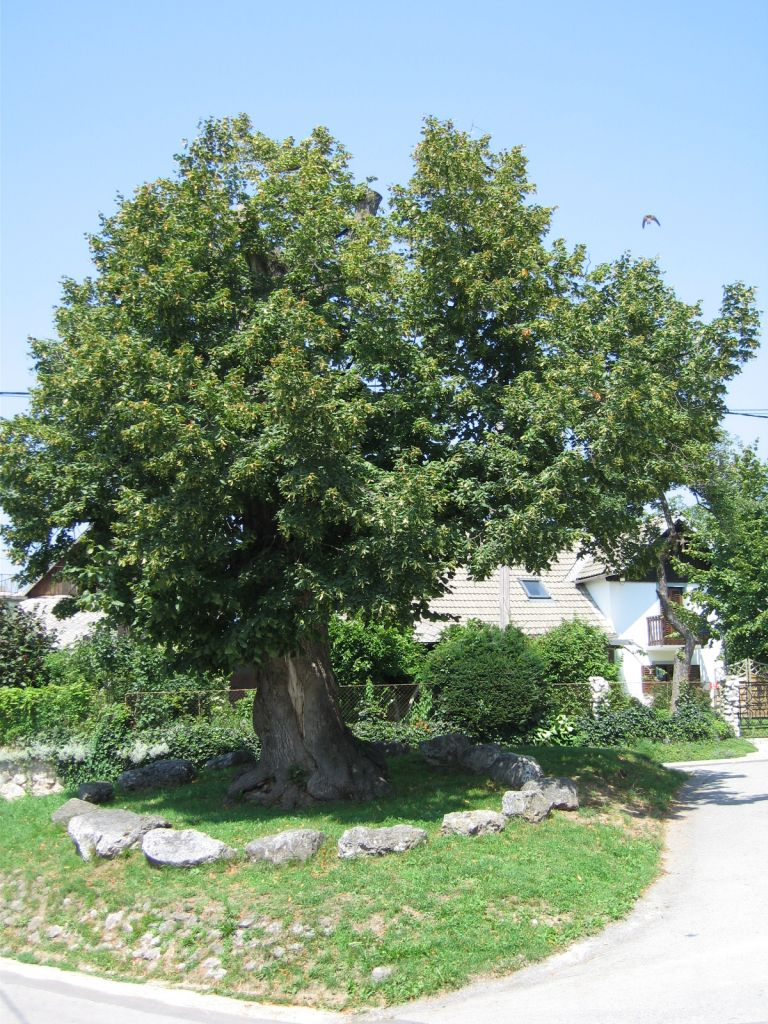
The village linden tree with 16 stones

== Notable people ==
Notable people that were born or lived in Vrba include:

- Janez Zlatoust Pogačar, bishop of Ljubljana (1875–1884)
- France Prešeren (1800–1849), poet
- Anton Vovk (1900–1963), archbishop of Ljubljana
