= Finžgar House =

House in Žirovnica, Slovenia

Coordinates: 46°23′36.82″N 14°9′47.19″E

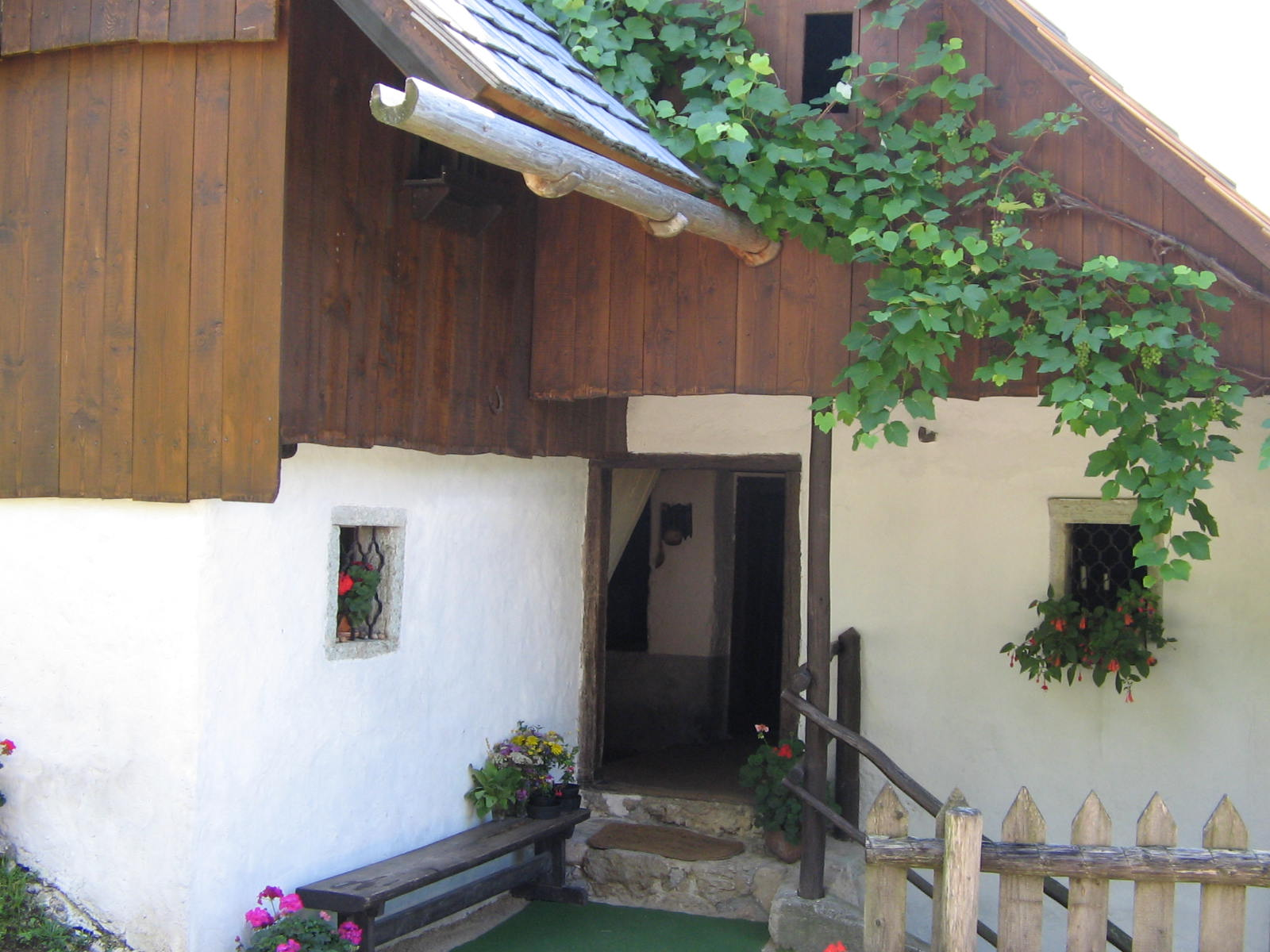
The birth house of the writer Fran Saleški Finžgar (1871–1962), Doslovče

The Finžgar House is a house in the village of Doslovče in the Municipality of Žirovnica in Slovenia. It is the house where the Slovene writer Fran Saleški Finžgar was born in 1871. Administratively, it is part of the Upper Carniola Museum from Kranj. As well as a museum about the writer, it is a museum of rural architecture and life in the Upper Carniola during the late 19th century. It is outfitted with original furniture from the period, some from the actual house and some gathered from elsewhere.

Until the 1930s, the house was a cultural centre and a meeting place of intellectuals from the area. In World War II, it was almost completely destroyed. It was converted into a museum in 1971, on the centenary of the writer's birth. The works were led by the ethnologist Janez Bogataj, whose mother was Finžgar's niece and who spent about 15 years in Finžgar's company. Finžgar was the initiator of the public arrangement of the Prešeren House in the nearby Vrba.
