= The Water Man =

Poem by France Prešeren

The Water Man (Slovene: Povodni mož) was the first Slovene art ballad. It was written around 1825 by the Slovene Romantic poet France Prešeren and published in 1830 in the first almanac of Krajnska čbelica. It is a narration about Urška, a flirt from Ljubljana who ended up in the hands of a handsome man who happened to be a vodyanoy (povodni mož). The poem was based on a story from The Glory of Carniola about a dance at Old Square in Ljubljana in July 1547, when Urška Šefer was enchanted by a vodyanoy and pulled into the Ljubljanica. Prešeren wrote it against the backdrop of his unfulfilled love for Zalika Dolenc. In the first publication of the poem, Urška was named Zalika. Later, in Prešeren's Poems (1847), she was named Urška.

== Cultural references ==
The Water Man was put to music several times, e.g. in 1910 by Viktor Parma, and in the 21st century by Miha Renčelj and Vitja Avsec. In 2021, an eponymous ballet was performed by Opera and Ballet of Slovene National Theatre Maribor on the Bled Island at the beginning of 2021 Slovenian Presidency of the Council of the European Union. In 2022, a pop rock musical based on the ballad and addressing the dangers of social networks was created and performed by popular Slovenian artists.
