= Fran Saleški Finžgar =

Slovene folk writer

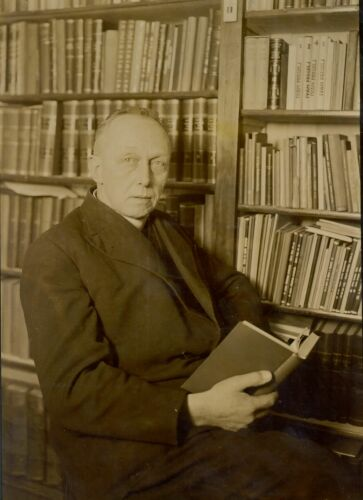
- Fran Saleški Finžgar (1931)
- Born: February 9, 1871; Doslovče
- Died: June 2, 1962 (aged 91); Ljubljana
- Occupations: Roman Catholic priest, novelist, short story writer, playwright, poet, translator
- Writing career
- Language: Slovene
- Notable works: Pod svobodnim soncem (1906–1907); Mister Torrent (1941)
- Notable awards: Prešeren Award (1951); Levstik Award (1953)

Fran Saleški Finžgar (February 9, 1871 – June 2, 1962) was perhaps the most popular Slovene folk writer. He is particularly known for his novels and short stories, although he also wrote poems and plays.

== Life ==
Fran Saleški Finžgar was born into a poor peasant family in the Upper Carniolan village of Doslovče, in what was then the Austro-Hungarian Empire, and his baptismal name was recorded as France Finžgar. His full name Fran Saleški refers to the saint he was named after, Francis de Sales. After finishing primary education in the town of Radovljica, he attended secondary school in Ljubljana between 1882 and 1891, continuing his education at the theological college. He was ordained priest in 1894 and worked in various parishes in Upper Carniola and Ljubljana until 1936, when he retired. He died in Ljubljana at the age of 91 and was buried at the Žale cemetery.

Politically, Finžgar was close to the Christian Socialist ideals of the Slovenian Catholic political activist and leader Janez Evangelist Krek. He was an admirer and friend of the prominent Social Democratic author Ivan Cankar, whom he attended at his deathbed in 1918. During World War II, he collaborated with the Communist-led Liberation Front of the Slovenian People, which led him to some conflict with the collaborationist bishop of Ljubljana, Gregorij Rožman.

The Finžgar House in Doslovče was frequented by many intellectuals from the area, particularly by his best friend Izidor Cankar, an influential art historian. The ethnologist Janez Bogataj, whose mother was Finžgar's niece, spent his first 15 years in Finžgar's company and arranged his birth house for public in 1971. Finžgar's close friend and personal advisor was also the architect Jože Plečnik. When Finžgar served as a priest in the parish of Trnovo in Ljubljana, Plečnik was his neighbour. In the late 1920s, Finžgar commissioned the renovation of the Trnovo parish church to his architect friend.

== Work ==
Finžgar started his literary career as a poet, but later turned to prose. He wrote novels in the Neo-Romantic style, depicting rural and small-town life. He is best known for his patriotic historical novel Under the Sun of Freedom (Slovene: Pod svobodnim soncem), written between 1906 and 1907 and partially modelled on Quo Vadis. The narrative was set during the late Migration Era of the 6th century AD, and depicted a three-way conflict between the primitive but vital South Slavic tribes, the advanced but decadent Byzantine Empire, and the brutal and culturally-alien Avars. The central character is the young Slavic prince Iztok, who makes his way incognito to Constantinople and joins the army in order to learn Roman military tactics, but also falls in love with a Greek noblewoman, navigates Byzantine court intrigue, and converts to Christianity.

Finžgar also wrote short stories and tales for children, the best known of which is Mr. Squall (Gospod Hudournik), a set interlinked humorous adventures of a city-dweller who delights in holidaying in the high Karawanks. In addition, he wrote a number of plays, none of them particularly successful. He translated several works of the Austrian poet Peter Rosegger, whom he admired, into Slovene. He was the editor of the family magazine Mladika (The Shoot) and member of the Slovene Academy of Sciences and Arts.

In 1939, Finžgar participated in the opening of the Prešeren House, the birth house of France Prešeren in Vrba, a village near Doslovče as a museum. In 1940, the Prešeren House and the village were filmed for the black and white sound documentary O, Vrba. It was directed by Mario Förster and produced in 1941. The house was presented by Finžgar, whereas Oton Župančič read the poem "O Vrba".
