= O, Vrba =

- Directed by: Mario Förster
- Starring: Fran Saleški Finžgar (voice); Oton Župančič (voice)
- Music by: Janko Gregorc
- Release date: 1945
- Running time: 7 minutes
- Country: Yugoslavia
- Language: Slovene

O, Vrba is a key Slovene pre-war documentary film. It was commissioned by the Educational Union (Slovene: Prosvetna zveza), directed by Mario Förster and produced in 1941 under the auspice of the company Emona Film. Its first internal premiere took place in the beginning of 1942. Due to the so-called "cultural silence" imposed in the Slovene Lands during World War II, it was released only in 1945 by the State Film Company. It is a short black and white film that shows the Prešeren House after it was opened as a museum, on the day when the authors found out about the German assault on Poland, reflected in a dark atmosphere of clouds traversing the Karawanks. The film reflects Förster's fine feel for light and composition. It contains voice recordings of the writer Fran Saleški Finžgar, who led the arrangement of the house, and of the poet Oton Župančič, who recited the Prešeren's poem O Vrba. The music, written by Janko Gregorc, was the first original Slovene film music. The montage and mixing of sound and picture were done by Rudi Omota.
