= Ivan Seljak =

Slovene painter and illustrator

Ivan Seljak - Čopič
- Born: December 7, 1927; Idrija, Slovenia
- Died: May 23, 1990 (aged 62)
- Education: Academy of Fine Arts, Ljubljana
- Known for: painting, illustrating
- Notable work: Painting and illustration
- Awards: Levstik Award; 1955 for Knjiga o Titu and Posadka brez ladje Levstik Award; 1963 for Aska in volk Prešeren Foundation Award; 1975 for his painting exhibitions Levstik Award; 1976 for Afriške pripovedke and Robinson Crusoe

Ivan Seljak, nom de guerre Čopič (7 December 1927 – 23 May 1990), was a Slovene painter and illustrator.

== Biography ==
Seljak was born in Idrija in 1927.

During the Second World War he joined the Slovene Partisans as a young military courier, where he met Božidar Jakac and other artists who encouraged his artistic talent. After the war he studied at the Academy of Fine Arts in Ljubljana, from which he graduated in 1951.

His main medium was painting, but he also illustrated numerous children's books.

He won the Levstik Award for his illustrations three times: in 1955, 1963, and 1976. He also won the Prešeren Foundation Award in 1975 for the exhibitions of his paintings.

He died in 1990.

== Selected illustrated works ==
- Koraki v svobodo (Marching to Freedom), by Peter Levec, 1945
- Otrok črnega rodu (A Child of a Dark Race), by Jože Pahor, 1947
- Tri hčere (The Three Daughters), Tatar folk tale, 1953
- Posadka brez ladje (The Crew without a Ship), by Tone Seliškar, 1955
- Knjiga o Titu (The Book about Tito), by France Bevk, 1955
- Dvanajst (Twelve), by Alexander Blok, 1957
- Neizprosni sever (The Harsh North), by Pavel Kunaver, 1958
- Novele (Short Stories), by Guy de Maupassant, 1958
- Vesele in žalostne o mulah (Happy and Sad Stories about Mules), by Tone Seliškar, 1963
- Aska in volk (Aska and the Wolf), by Ivo Andrić, 1963
- Gregec Kobilica (Gregec Kobilica), by Branka Jurca, 1965
- Robinson Crusoe (Robinson Crusoe), by Daniel Defoe, 1975
- Moja pesem (My Song), poetry by Karel Destovnik, 1985
