= Marija Kessler =

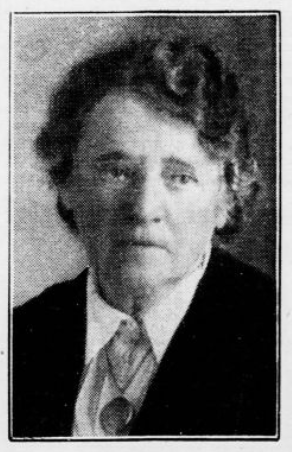
Marija Kessler Portrait

Marija Kessler (April 24, 1860 – May 1, 1939), was a Slovene socialite. Her salon was the cultural center of artist life in Ljubljana in the late 19th century, and was regarded as the most notable example of a salon in Slovenia hosting people like Ivana Kobilca, Ivan Cankar and Mira Pintar.

She was the mother of the poet Vera Albreht, and the mother-in-law of the poets Fran Albreht and Oton Župančič.

== Sources ==
- Vladimir Klemenčič (ed.): Obdobje socialnega realizma v slovenskem jeziku, književnosti in kulturi. Ljubljana 1987, ISBN 86-7207-002-X, p. 128.
