= Doslovče =

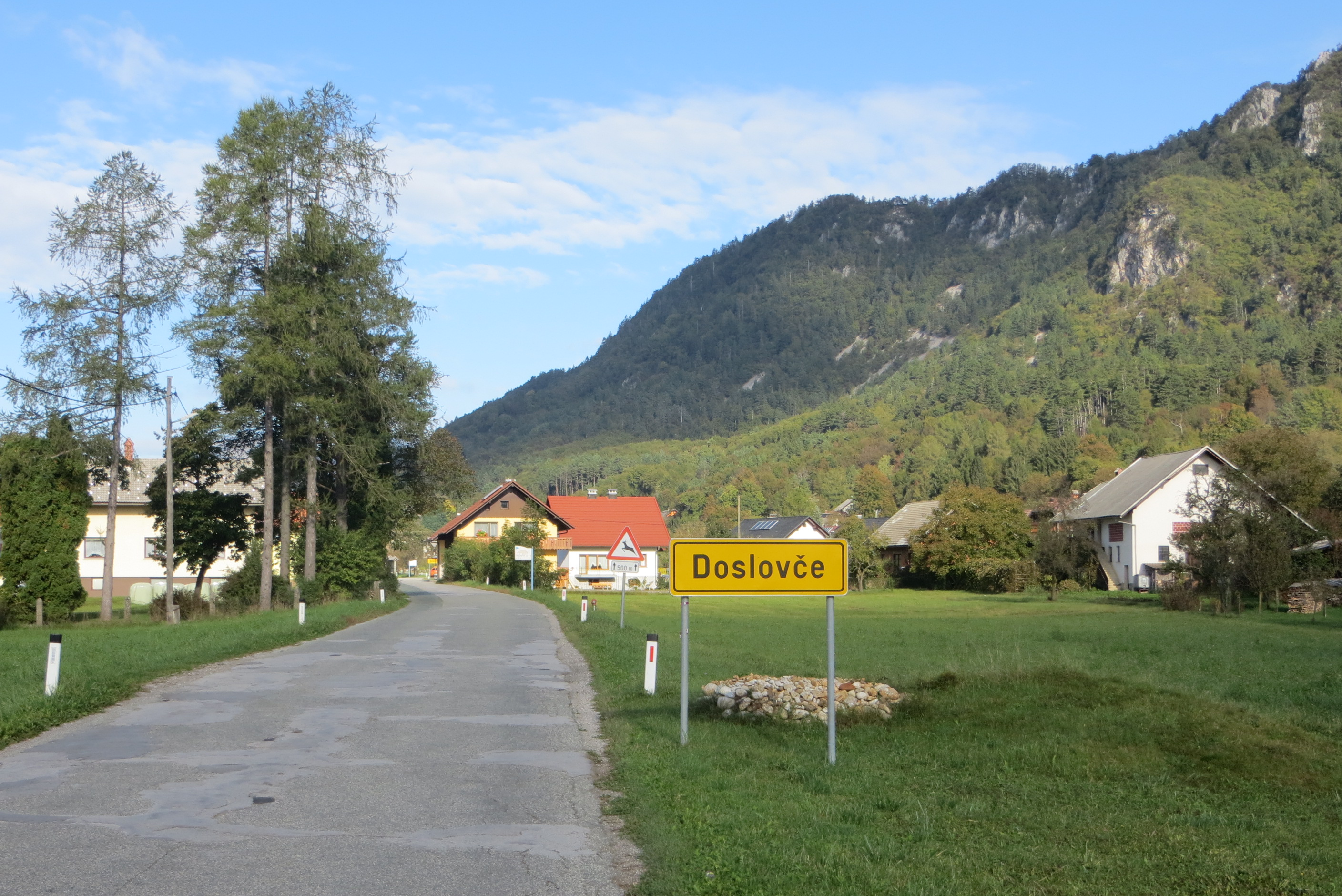

- Location in Slovenia
- Coordinates: 46°23′38″N 14°9′45″E
- Country: Slovenia
- Traditional region: Upper Carniola
- Statistical region: Upper Carniola
- Municipality: Žirovnica
- Elevation: 542 m (1,778 ft)

Population (2002)
  - Total: 110

Doslovče (pronounced [ˈdoːslɔu̯tʃɛ]; in older sources also Dosloviče, German: Doslowitsch) is one of ten villages in the Municipality of Žirovnica in the Upper Carniola region of Slovenia. It is best known as the birthplace of the Slovene writer Fran Saleški Finžgar. His house has been a small museum since 1971.
