= Breda Šček =

Italian/Slovene composer (1893–1968)

Breda Friderika Šček Orel (20 August 1893 – 11 March 1968) was an Italian-Slovene composer, choir conductor, and singer. She published her music under the name Breda Šček.

== Life ==
Šček was one of eight children born in Trieste to Slovene parents Vincencija Kanta and Josip Šček, a train driver. She studied music at the Tartini Conservatory in Trieste and at the Music Liceo Martini in Bologna, Italy. Her teachers included Tina Bendazzi-Garulli, Valdo Garulli, and Adolf Skolek. She married Silvester Orel sometime before 1912.

Šček worked as a singer, teacher, and choral conductor. She notated and arranged previously unpublished folk music. She also composed music for texts by Giovanni Pascoli and more than 30 Slovenian writers, including Franceta Bevka, Karel Destovnik (Kajuh), Simon Gregorčič, Srečko Kosovel, Fran Levstik, France Prešeren, Tone Seliškar, and Oton Župančič (Gojko).

Šček self-published some of her music. Drustvo Hrvatskih Skladatelja also published her works.

== Works ==
=== Orchestra ===
- Mala Suite
- Piccola Suite

=== Piano ===
- Preludiji
- Zvonovi v praznik, 8 pieces

=== Vocal ===
- Cez pohorje sinje, 8 songs (voice and piano)
- "Dekle na vrtu zelenem" (voice and piano)
- Hasanaginica, Cantata (solo voice, choir and piano)
- Jugoslavija, 8 pieces (youth choir)
- "Juhej, jaz pa v gorco grem" (voice and piano)
- Kadar jaz, dekle, umria bom, 33 folk songs (choir)
- Mass
- Med rozami, 4 solo songs
- Oj vrba, 5 songs (voice and piano)
- Pojmo spat, 11 pieces (youth choir)
- Raste mi raste, 7 songs (voice and piano)
- Soci, Cantata (men's choir and orchestra)
- Starka zima
- Sveti Andrej, 23 pieces (men's choir)
- V Nazaretu roza raste, 12 pieces (men's choir)
