= Help in the Winter =

Help in the Winter (Slovene: Zimska pomoč) was a Slovene almanac published in 1944 by 110 anticommunist authors in protest against the Slovene Liberation Front's policy of cultural silence. Whereas the authors were gathered under the guise of charitable activity, later, their work was claimed to be a direct and effective opposition to the cultural silence. The authors who published the almanac did not join the Partisan movement.
