= Vera Albreht =

Slovenian poet, writer, publicist and translator

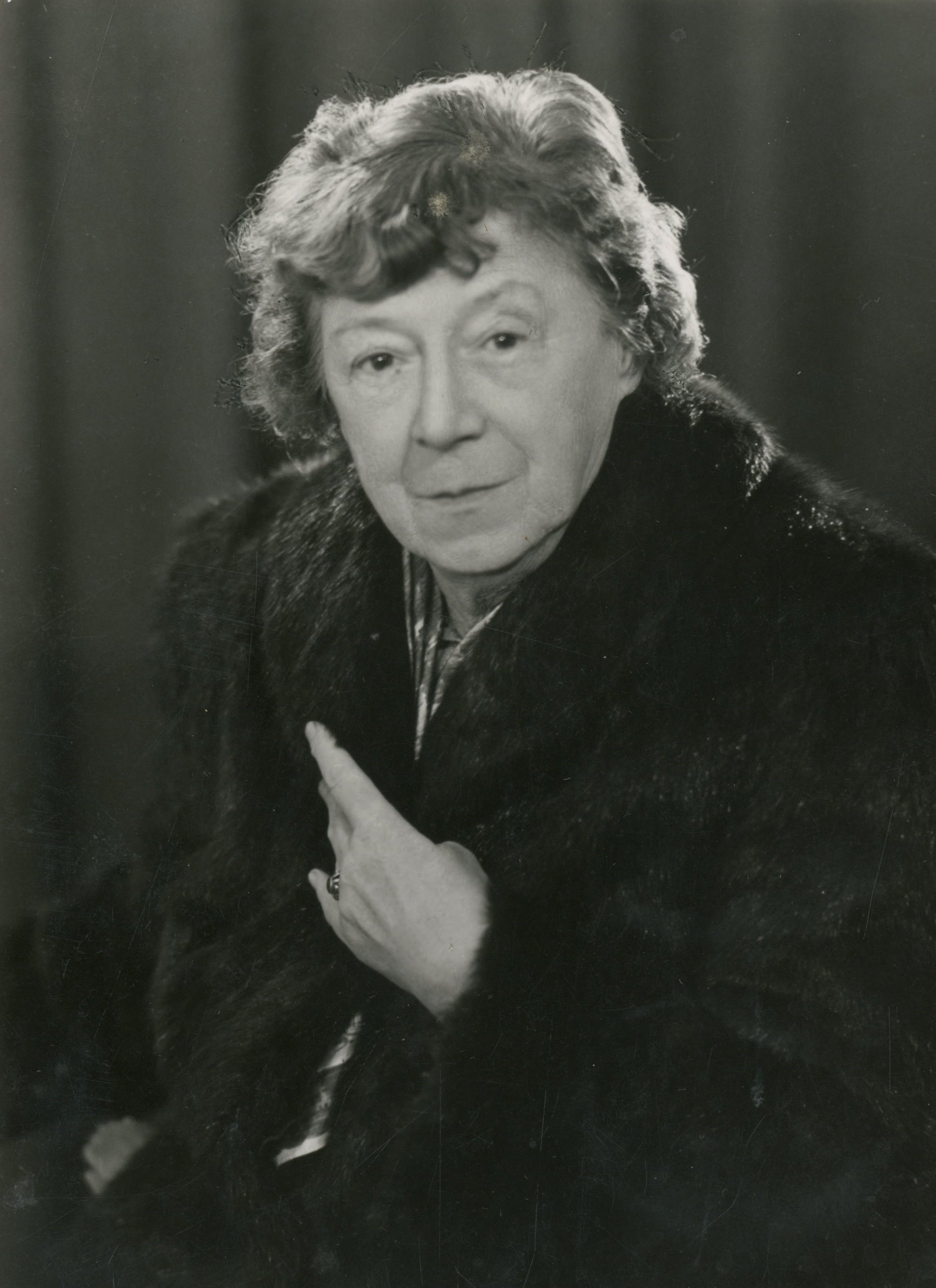
Vera Albreht in 1961

Vera Albreht (née Kessler, 12 February 1895 – 25 May 1971) was a Slovenian poet, writer, publicist and translator.

== Life ==
Vera Albreht was born in 1895 in Krško, Austria-Hungary, where she was baptized Vera Mathilda Maria Paulina Aloisia Kessler. She was born into a bourgeois family who were known as supporters of Slovenian modernism. Her mother was Marija Kessler (née Trenz), an ethnic German socialite, while her father Rudolph Kessler was a Slovene. Her parents' home in Ljubljana was a well known meeting point of the Slovenian literary scene at the time, frequented among others also by her friend Mira Pintar, and Ivan Cankar and Oton Župančič, who married Vera's sister Ana Kessler.

Albreht was educated at the all-girls grammar school in Ljubljana, where she was involved in a school protest against the Habsburg monarchy by wearing red blouses because its soldiers shot at demonstrators.

Albreht studied at the University of Vienna, but never completed her studies due to the outbreak of World War I. During World War I, she worked as a volunteer Red Cross nurse. In 1919 she married the poet and critic Fran Albreht.

During World War II, Albreht and her husband actively participated with the Liberation Front of the Slovenian People. They were both imprisoned by the Italian fascist authorities on a number of occasions between 1941 and 1943. In 1944, she was sent to Ravensbrück concentration camp by the Germans. Albreht later wrote Ravensbriške pesmi (Poems of Ravensbrück) about her experiences.

After the war, Albreht moved with her husband to Ljubljana, where she worked as a publicist and at the Slovene center of International PEN. She died in 1971 in Ljubljana.

== Works ==
Prose

- 1957 – Lupinica (youth prose)
- 1960 – Nekoč pod Gorjanci (Once Upon a Time below the Gorjanci Hills) (youth prose)
- 1964 – Babica in trije vnučki (Granny and Her Three Grandchildren) (youth prose)

Poetry

- 1950 – Mi gradimo (We Build) (youth poetry)
- 1950 – Orehi (Walnuts) (youth poetry)
- 1955 – Vesela abeceda (The Happy Alphabet) (youth poetry)
- 1958 – Živali pri delu in jelu (Animals at Work) (youth poetry)
- 1965 – Pustov god (Pust's Celebration) (youth poetry)
- 1967 – Jutro (Morning) (youth poetry)
- 1967 – Pri igri (At Play) (youth poetry)
- 1967 – Večer (Evening) (youth poetry)
- 1969 – ABC (youth poetry)
- 1972 – Mornar (The Sailor) (youth poetry)
- 1972 – Slikarka (The Painter) (youth poetry)
- 1977 – Ravensbriške pesmi (Ravensbrück Poems)(poetry)
- 1978 – Dobro jutro (Good Morning) (youth poetry)

== See also ==
- List of Slovenian language poets
- Slovenian literature
- Culture of Slovenia
- Yugoslav People's Liberation War
