= Anton Vovk =

20th-century Catholic bishop

His Excellency Anton Vovk
- Archbishop of Ljubljana
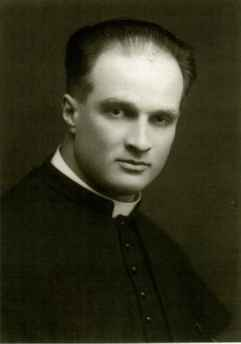
- Diocese: Ljubljana
- Installed: 26 November 1959
- Term ended: 7 July 1963
- Predecessor: Gregorij Rožman
- Successor: Jože Pogacnik

Orders
- Ordination: 29 June 1923
- Consecration: 1 December 1946

Personal details
- Born: 19 May 1900 Vrba, Austria-Hungary
- Died: 7 July 1963 (aged 63) Ljubljana, Slovenia (former Yugoslavia)
- Buried: Ljubljana, Slovenia

The Archbishop Anton Vovk (19 May 1900 – 7 July 1963) was a Roman Catholic priest. He served as auxiliary Bishop of the Diocese of Ljubljana from 1946 to 1961, as well as the first Archbishop of Ljubljana.

== Biography ==
Vovk's father Jožef Vovk and mother Marija née Debelak died when he was young. He was born in the village of Vrba in Upper Carniola in the same house where the poet France Prešeren had been born 100 years earlier (Vovk was Prešeren's grand-nephew because his grandmother Marija “Mina” Volk was Prešeren's sister).

He attended two years of primary school in Breznica and then in Kranj, where he also attended upper secondary school. In 1917 he enrolled in the seminary at the episcopal school in Šentvid, Ljubljana and later in the Ljubljana seminary. He was ordained a priest on 29 June 1923. He served in Metlika and Tržič, where he also became the parish priest in 1928. In 1940 he was appointed an episcopal advisor and Ljubljana canon. During the Axis partition and annexation of Slovenia in the Second World War he assisted refugee priests. In 1944 he became the rector of the seminary.

As general vicar, in June 1945 he assumed the leadership of the Diocese of Ljubljana after Gregorij Rožman fled Yugoslavia. He was installed as bishop on 1 December 1946 and named auxiliary bishop of Ljubljana. In 1950 he was named apostolic administrator of the Diocese of Ljubljana with the rights of a bishop in residence. From 1951 to 1961 he also administered the Slovene part of Rijeka and from 1951 to 1955 the Slovene part of the Diocese of Trieste-Koper. After the death of Gregorij Rožman in Cleveland in 1959, Vovk was ordained bishop of Ljubljana. Pope John XXIII raised the Diocese of Ljubljana to an archbishopric on 22 December 1961, simultaneously elevating Vovk to the position of archbishop of Ljubljana.

The communist regime persecuted Vovk mentally (through nighttime interrogations) and physically, although he had not cooperated with the Axis forces during the war and had promoted Slovene identity. Vovk steadfastly sought to have the communist authorities recognize the constitutionally defined position of the Church and to abandon their persecution and accusations against it. Under the influence of such propaganda, on 20 January 1952 Vovk was doused with gasoline and set alight by secret police agents at the Bršljin train station in Novo Mesto, where he had traveled in order to bless the renovated organ in the nearby Parish of Stopiče. At the time, the Slovene press in Yugoslavia and abroad denied that Vovk had been burned at all or stated that he had suffered only minor injuries. In fact, his burning clothing, especially his celluloid clerical collar, caused serious burns to his neck and face. Although he did not die from his injuries, he suffered from them for the remainder of his life. On 13 May 1999 an episcopal decision was made to begin the process for his beatification, whereby Vovk acquired the epithet Servant of God.
