= Mira Pintar =

Slovenian painter and art collector (1891–1980)

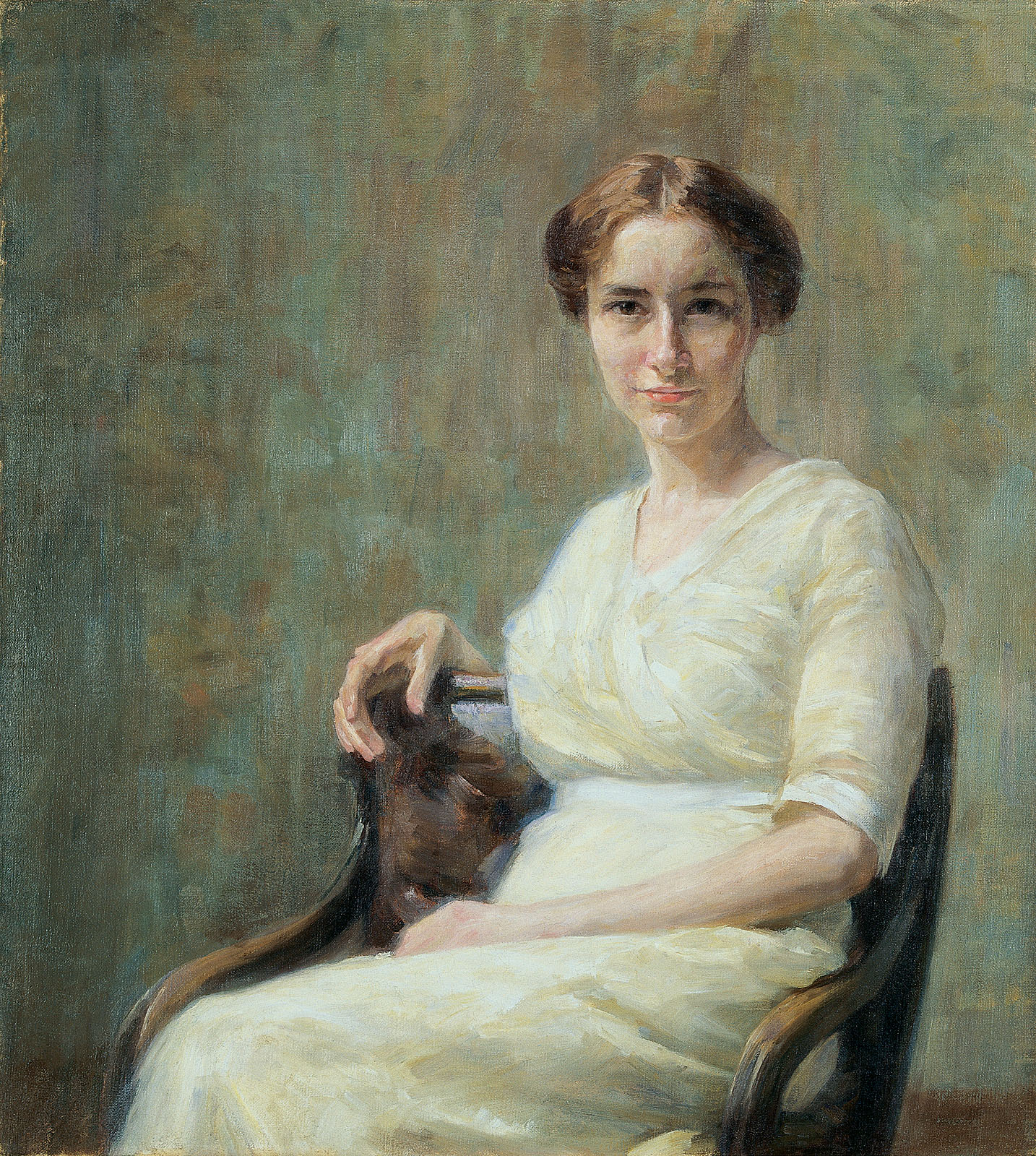
- Portrait of Mira Pintar from 1913, painted by her aunt Ivana Kobilca
- Born: Marija Ana Frančiška Pintar; 5 February 1891; Novo mesto, Austria-Hungary
- Died: 23 June 1980 (aged 89); Ljubljana, Socialist Republic of Slovenia, SFR Yugoslavia
- Occupations: bank clerk, artist, art collector
- Relatives: Ivana Kobilca (aunt)

Marija Ana Frančiška Pintar, also known as Mira Pintar, (5 February 1891 – 23 June 1980) was a Slovenian bank clerk, artist, and art collector. Closely associated with her aunt, the painter Ivana Kobilca, she played an important role as the custodian of her aunt's artistic estate after the painter's death. Although she rarely exhibited her own work, she was active as an embroiderer and painter, and was an important part of the artistic and intellectual circles of early 20th-century Ljubljana.

== Childhood and education ==
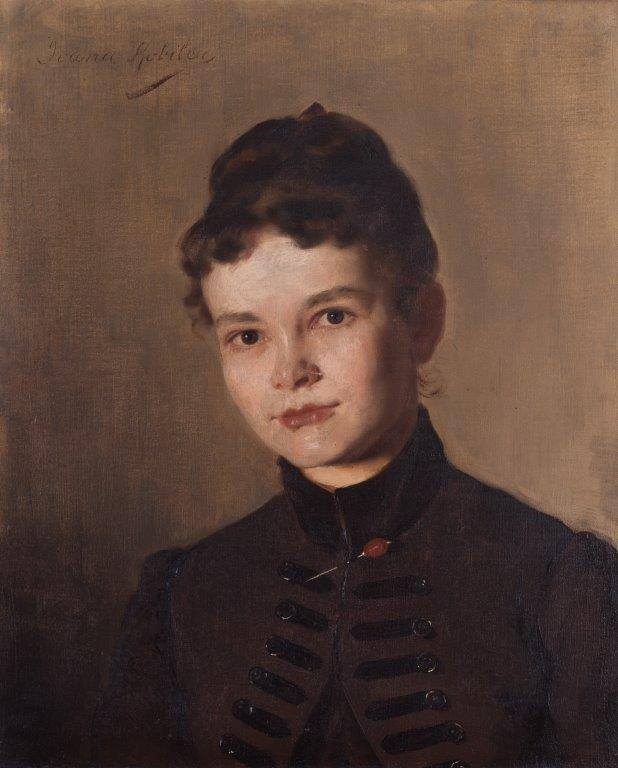
Portrait of Mira's mother, painted in 1887 by Ivana Kobilca.

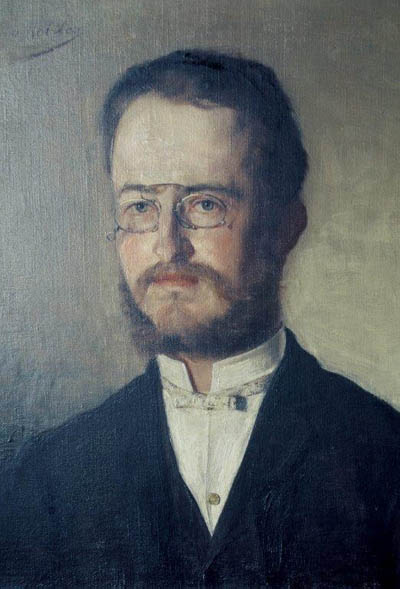
Portrait of Mira's father, painted c. 1890 by Ivana Kobilca.

She was born into a Slovenian family on 5 February 1891 in Novo mesto. Her mother was a private needlework teacher Marija Kobilca (1860–1946), sister of the painter Ivana Kobilca, and her father was the librarian and writer Luka Pintar (1857–1915). She had an older brother, the physician Ivan Pintar (1888–1963). Both of her parents, especially her mother, helped Ivana Kobilca sell paintings and manage commissions. In 1898, Mira moved with her parents and brother to Ljubljana. From an early age she learned embroidery from her mother. After elementary school she attended a higher city school and also privately studied foreign languages. In the 1906/07 school year, her art teacher there was Ivana Kobilca. That year Mira Pintar also began studying with her aunt in her free time. At the end of 1907 Ivana Kobilca moved to Berlin, but remained in close contact with her niece and taught her painting when they were together. They also travelled on holidays together. After finishing the higher civic school, Mira completed the girls' lyceum at Mladika in Ljubljana. She also studied painting at the school of Rihard Jakopič in Ljubljana. After completing the lyceum, she trained in office work at St Christopher's Institute.

== Portrait ==
In the summer of 1913, she visited Ivana Kobilca in Berlin for a holiday. The painter had already been in poor health for several years. The visit cheered her, and she began working more actively and exhibiting again. During this period, she painted the portrait of Mira. In the painting, the girl wears a white dress and her hair is pinned up. Kobilca had for several years been concerned with whiteness and light, and therefore did not varnish the bright oil painting. The work, aligned with bourgeois modernism, is regarded as one of the artist's finest and among the best works by Slovenian artists more generally. It is held in the permanent collection of the National Gallery of Slovenia.

== Career ==
After her education, she worked as a bank clerk. Alongside her job she was very active in the arts. She produced embroidery, especially hand-embroidered tablecloths, and exhibited them. She also painted extensively, mainly still lifes, and drew portraits in charcoal and pencil. Out of self-criticism, she did not exhibit her paintings. She socialized with pianist Dana Kobler and writer Vera Kressler Albreht, and visited the salon of Vera's mother. There she met the writer Ivan Cankar, who in 1911 named the second part Mira of his novella triptych Volja in moč after her, as well as the painter Matija Jama, the poet Oton Župančič, the writer Vladimir Levstik, and other notable Slovenian intellectuals. She also introduced Ivana Kobilca to the salon and its visitors; Kobilca later portrayed several of them. She was an art collector as well, and among the founders of the National Gallery Society (Društvo Narodna galerija), established on 18 September 1918.

== Ivana Kobilca’s estate ==
Even after taking up employment, she maintained close ties with her aunt. In letters, her aunt gave her detailed instructions on handling paintings and even entrusted her with restoring her faded signatures. She also helped her aunt with interviews. At the end of 1926 Ivana Kobilca died, and in her will appointed Mira Pintar as custodian of her legacy and heir to most of her unsold paintings. After twelve years as a bank clerk, she left her job in the 1930s and devoted herself to caring for her aunt's estate and to her own artistic work.

== Later life and death ==
She never married and had no children. She lived in Ljubljana with her mother, who died in 1946. She died in Ljubljana on 23 June 1980.
