= Prešeren House =

House in the Municipality of Žirovnica, Slovenia

Coordinates: 46°23′16.34″N 14°8′50.89″E

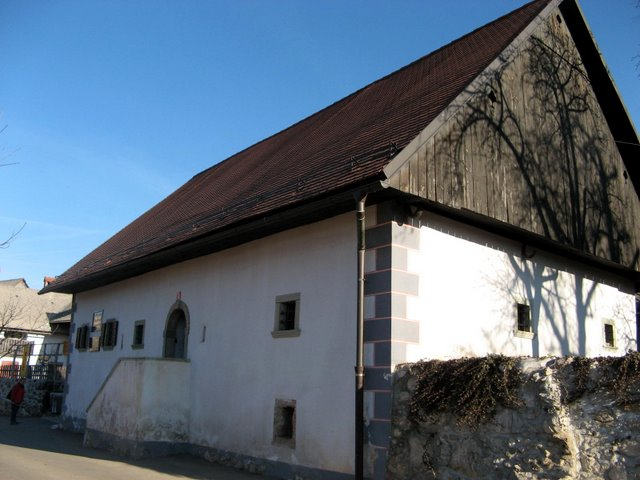
Prešeren House in Vrba

The Prešeren House (traditional Slovene estate name pr' Ribču) is a house in the village of Vrba in the Municipality of Žirovnica in Slovenia. It is the house where the Slovene poet France Prešeren was born in 1800. The Slovene theologian and archbishop Anton Vovk was also born in the same house in 1900. The house is a good example of an Upper Carniolan farmhouse. Since 1939, it has housed a small museum collection with furnishings from the poet's time.

It was originally a 16th-century wooden building with a stone cellar. It was heavily damaged and rebuilt after a fire in 1856. It is mainly due to the efforts of Fran Saleški Finžgar that the house was turned into a museum. It is fitted with 19th-century furnishings. Of the original furniture from Prešeren's time, the benches in the hallway and the main room, a wooden chest from 1837, and the actual cradle in which France Prešeren is alleged to have been rocked to sleep as a baby are preserved and displayed in the museum. In 1985, a section with a collection of books was added to the museum and includes translations of Prešeren's poems into various languages, various editions of his poems, and books about his life and work. The museum was opened to the public on 21 May 1939.

In 1940, the house and the village were filmed for the black and white sound documentary O, Vrba. It was directed by Mario Förster and produced in 1941. Due to the "cultural silence," it was not released until 1945. The house was presented by Finžgar, which is a rare recording of his voice. Due to the news about the German assault on Poland the film has a threatening atmosphere created by clouds moving over the Karawanks mountain range.

The house and nearby St. Mark's Church are on the Cultural Heritage Route, a trail through the villages of the Municipality of Žirovnica. In January 2011, the house, St. Mark's Church, and the linden tree in the centre of the village were proclaimed cultural monuments of national importance by the Government of Slovenia.

== Gallery ==
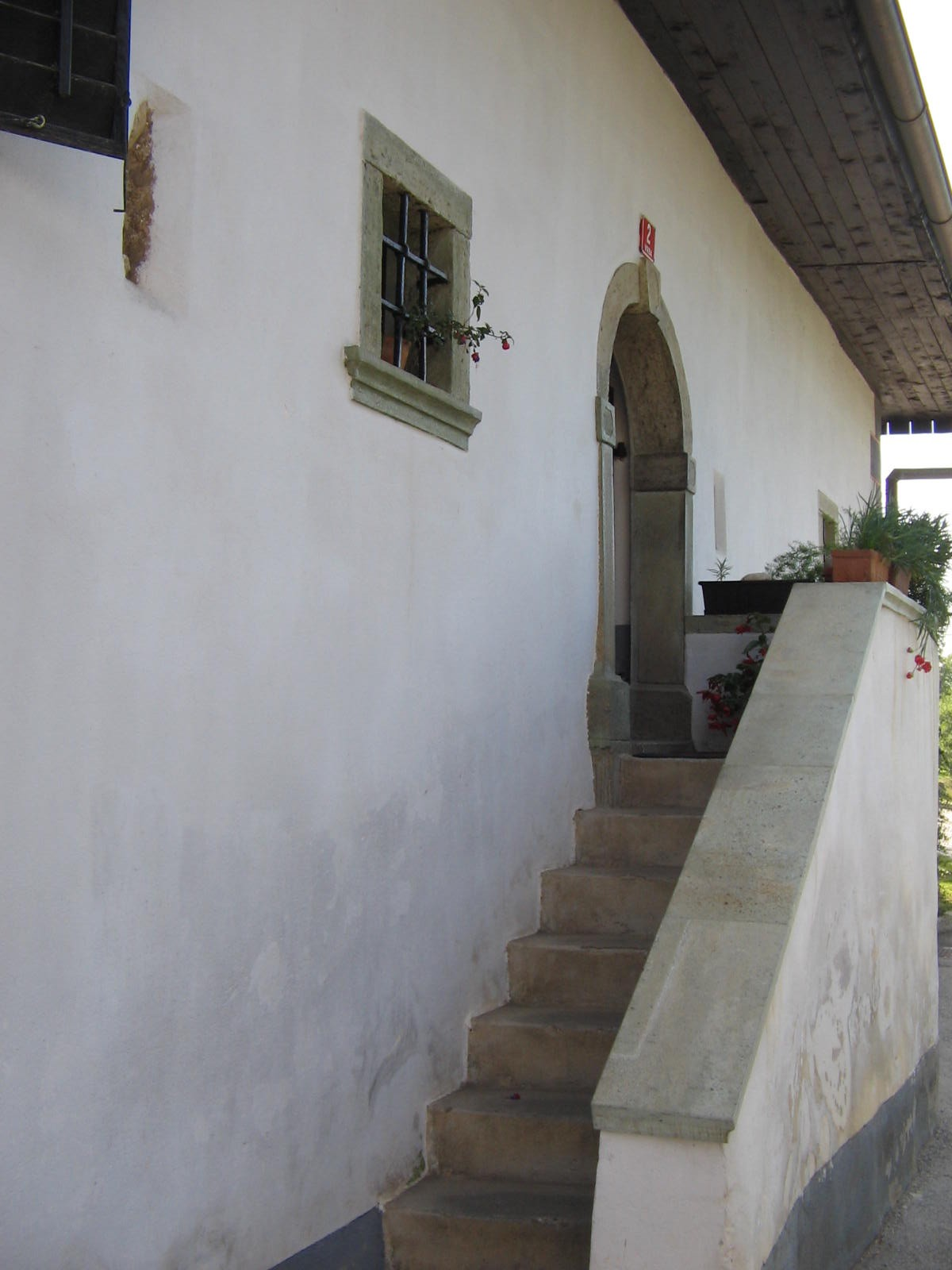
Entrance to the museum

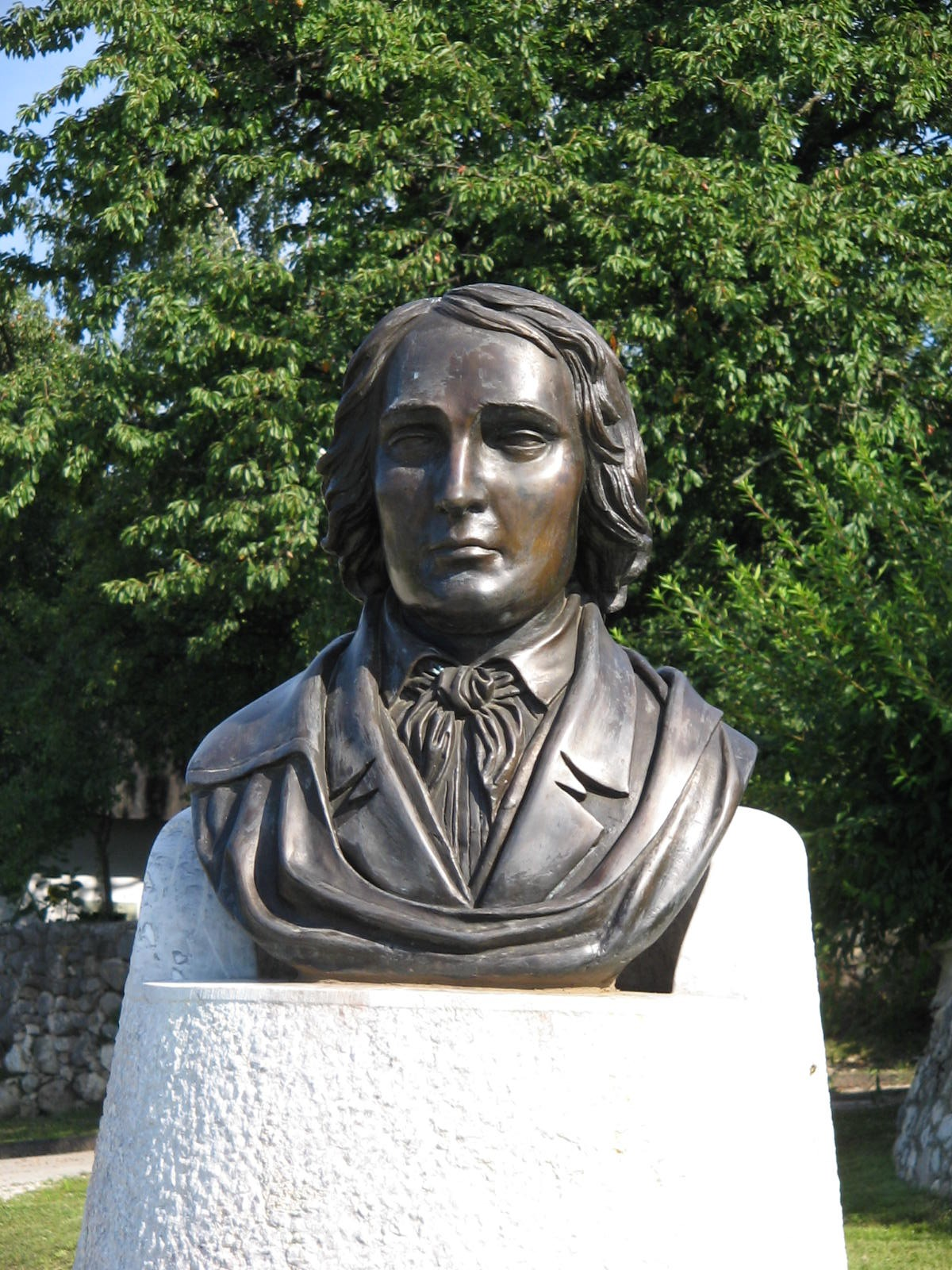
Bronze bust of Prešeren in Vrba

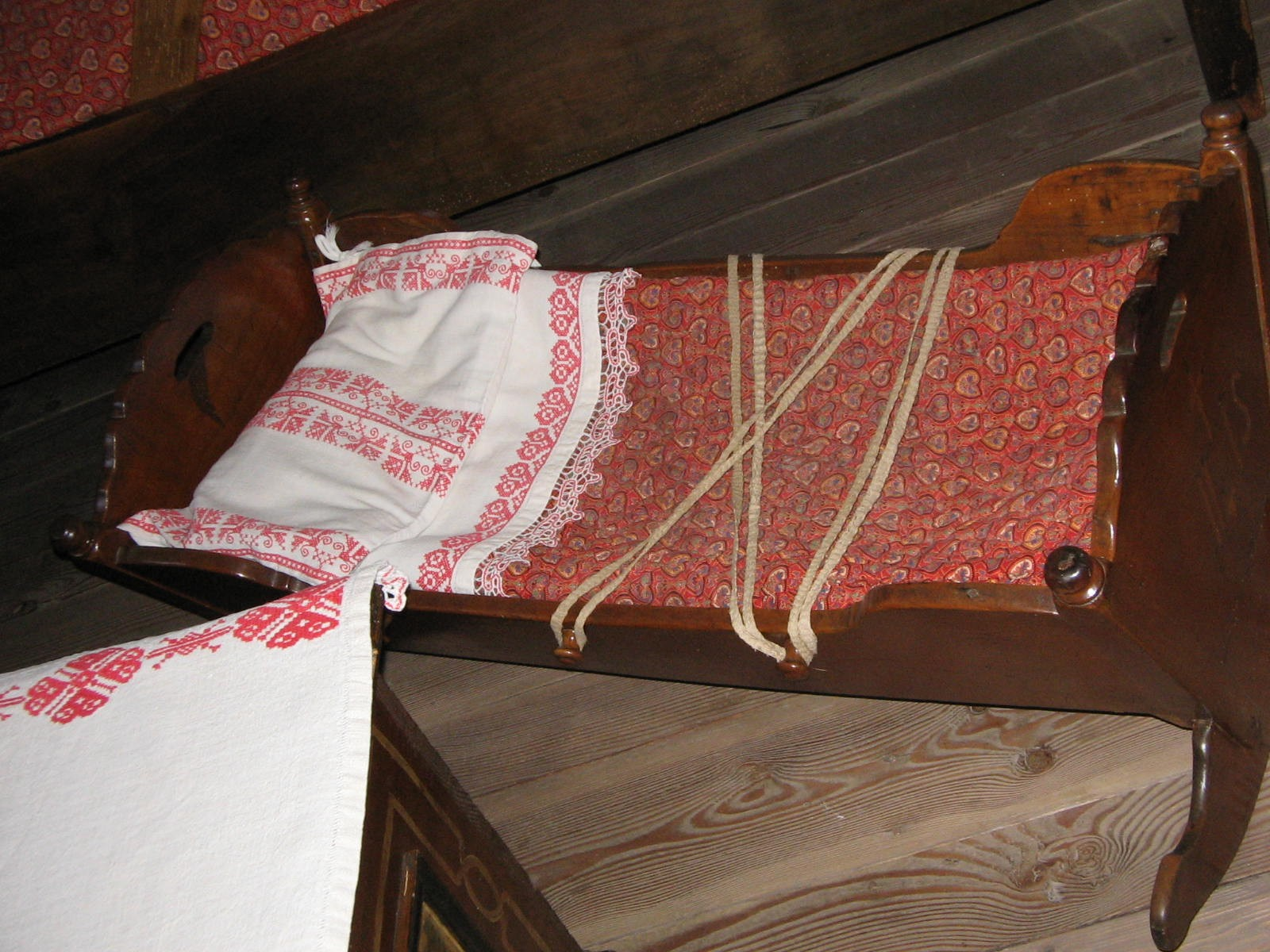
Original cradle

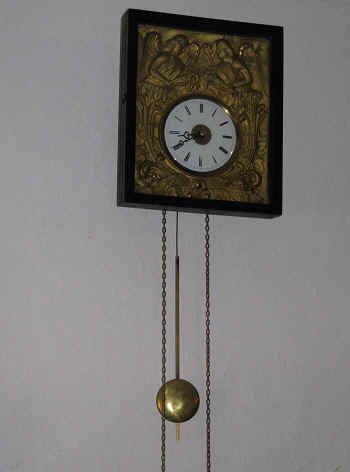
18th-century pendulum clock

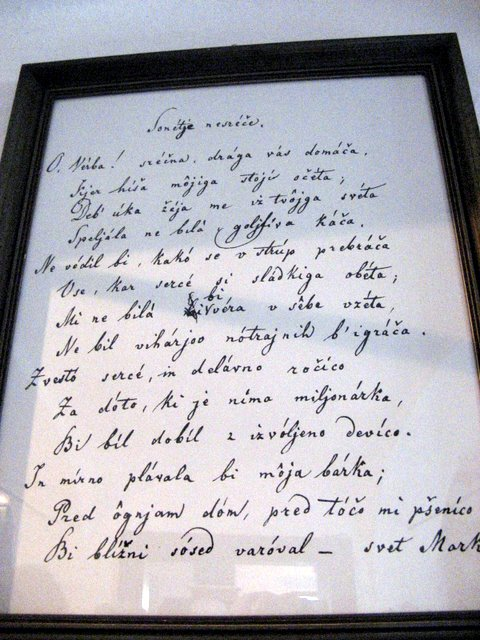
Prešeren's manuscript of "Sonnets of Misfortune"

== See also ==
- Finžgar House
