= Tone Seliškar =

Slovene writer, poet, journalist and teacher

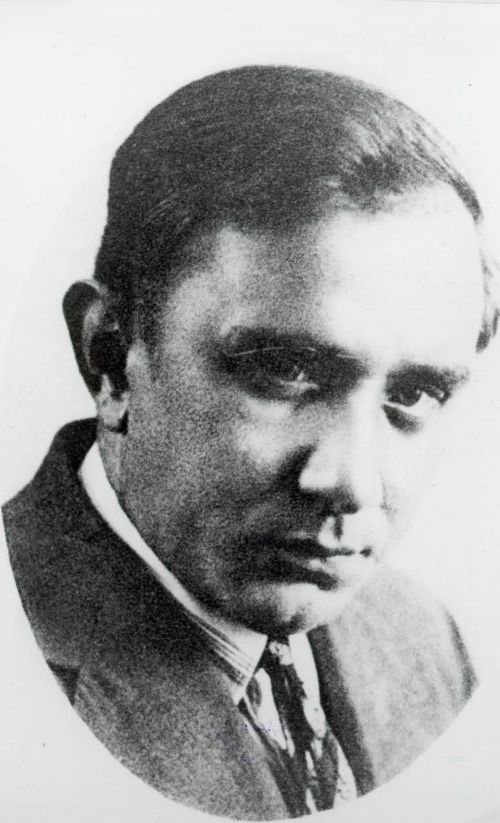
- Born: 1 April 1900; Ljubljana, Austria-Hungary (now Slovenia)
- Died: 10 August 1969 (aged 69); Ljubljana
- Occupations: Writer; poet; teacher; journalist
- Writing career
- Notable works: Bratovščina Sinjega galeba, Mule
- Notable awards: Prešeren Award; 1947 for the story "Tovariši"

Anton "Tone" Seliškar (1 April 1900 – 10 August 1969) was a Slovene writer, poet, journalist and teacher. He published poetry, short stories and novels and is also known for his young adult fiction. Together with Mile Klopčič, he is considered the foremost representative of Slovene social realist poetry of the 1930s and 1940s.

Seliškar was born in Ljubljana in what was then Austria-Hungary in 1900 as the youngest child in a family of seven children. He became a teacher and worked in Dramlje, Trbovlje and Ljubljana. At the encouragement of Prežihov Voranc Seliškar became an activist in the Slovene Liberation Front in 1942 and in 1943 joined the partisans. He used the motif of life in the partisans in many of his later works. After the war he worked as a journalist and editor.

In 1947 he won the Prešeren Award for his story Tovariši (Comrades).

The public library in Trbovlje is named after Seliškar.

Slovene composer Breda Šček set Seliškar's works to music.
