= O Vrba =

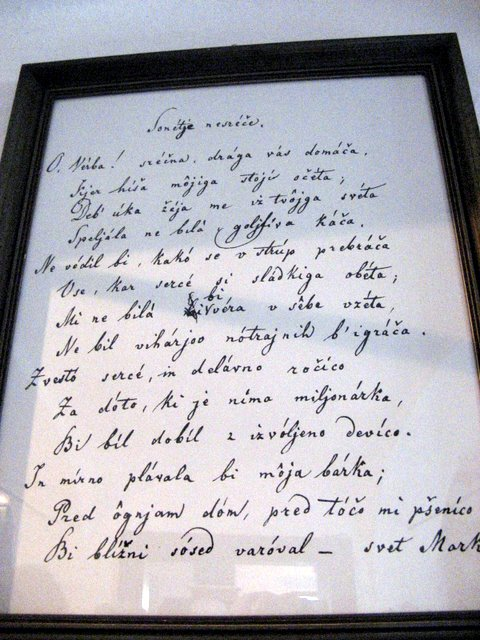
"O Vrba", the manuscript from Prešeren House in the poet's home village of Vrba

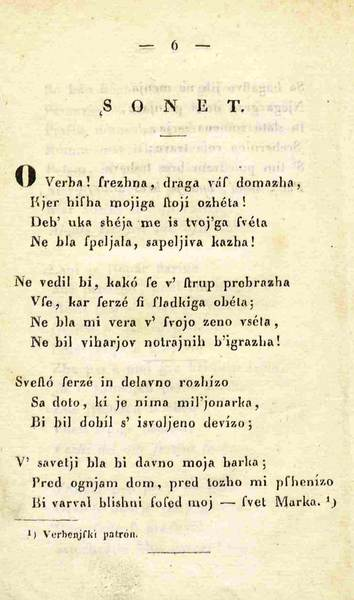
"O Vrba", the first of the Sonnets of Misfortune, in its original form published in 1834 in the 4th volume of Krajnska čbelica

"O Vrba" is a sonnet written in 1832 and later corrected by the Slovene Romantic poet France Prešeren, who is considered the national poet of Slovenia. It was published in 1834 in the fourth volume of the almanac Krajnska čbelica (Carniolan Bee). It is the introductory exposition of a cycle of six sonnets, titled the Sonnets of Misfortune (Slovene: Sonetje nesreče). The sonnet is dedicated to the Prešeren's home village of Vrba, expressing a sense of general melancholy over the lost idyll of the rural environment. According to contemporary Slovene literary critics, especially Marija Pirjevec, Boris Paternu and Janko Kos, the meaning of the sonnet is centered on the problem of insecurity and unhappiness of a free subject detached from the theocentric world view. The sonnet form follows the rules abstracted by August Wilhelm Schlegel from the sonnets of Petrarch. In the 20th century, several musical interpretations of the poem were created, the most known of them probably being a version by the Slovene folk rock musician Vlado Kreslin.
