= Cultural silence =

1942 boycott by the Slovene Liberation Front

Cultural silence (Slovene: kulturni molk) was the boycott, ordered in January 1942 by the communist-dominated Slovene Liberation Front (OF), of all cultural activities and events connected with the German and Italian annexation of Slovenia because the Axis powers authorities limited or forbade cultural activities in Slovene. It was symbolically announced at a concert in the Union Hall in Ljubljana with the popular song The Lime Tree Is in Leaf (Lipa zelenela je). After the capitulation of Italy in 1943, it meant a complete stop to all cultural activity outside the OF.

On 23 January 1943, it was breached by the Academy of Sciences and Arts. In 1944, 110 anticommunist authors published the almanac Help in the Winter (Zimska pomoč) in protest against the policy. The cultural silence postponed the release of the 1941 documentary film O, Vrba until August 1945.

The "cultural silence" was never precisely defined, and after the war the communist authorities used it as a weapon to exact revenge on cultural figures that were deemed undesirable while turning a blind eye to the wartime activity of other cultural figures.
