= The Carniolan Bee =

First almanac of poetry in Slovene

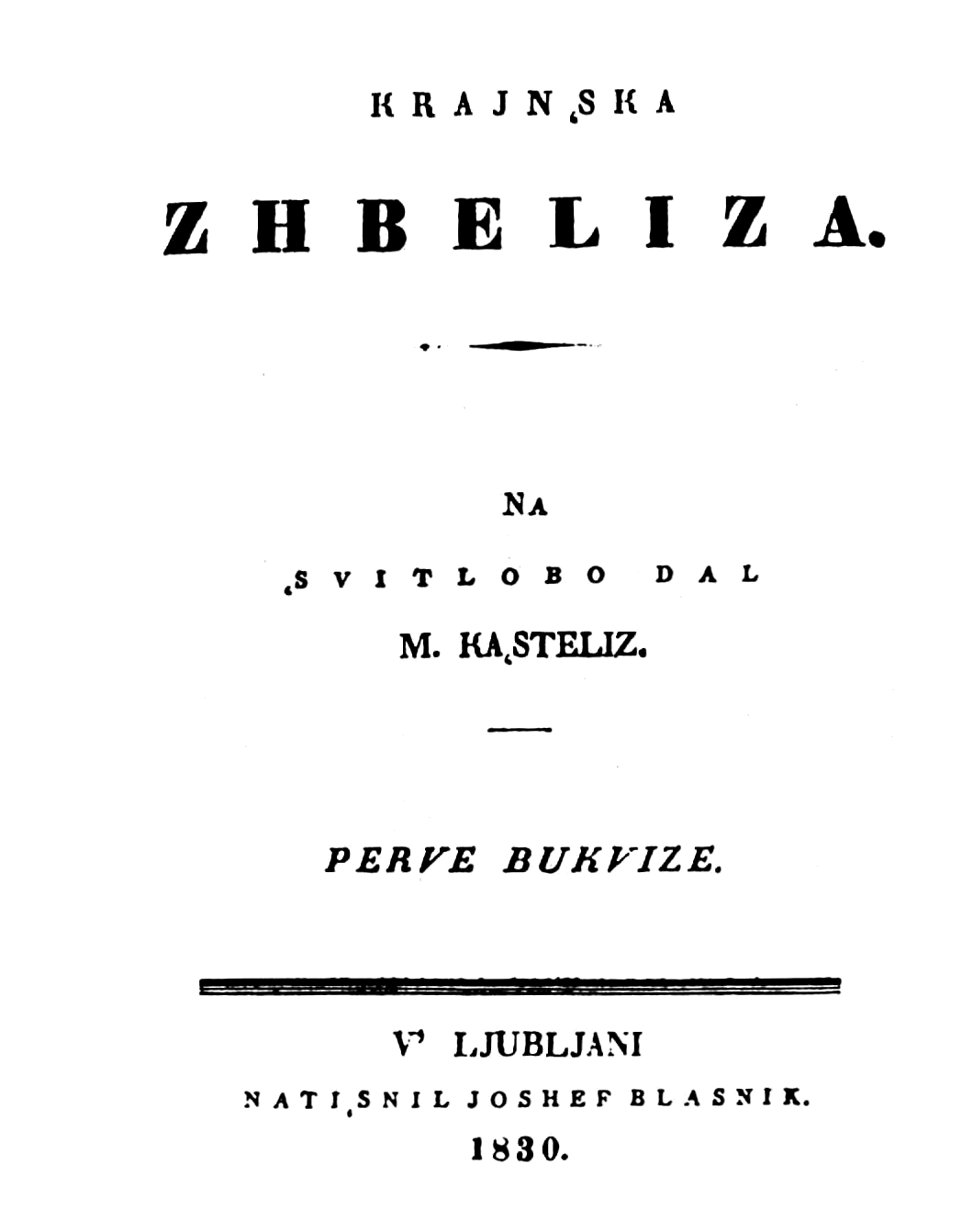
The front page (1830)

The Carniolan Bee (Slovene: Krajnska čbelica) was the first almanac of poetry in Slovene. The first volume was published on 30 April 1830, with subsequent volumes published in 1831, 1832, 1834 and 1848. Its editor was Miha Kastelic, whereas the prominent authors were France Prešeren, Matija Čop and Andrej Smole. The almanac was intended for educated readers and aimed at spreading Slovene among them.
