= France Prešeren =

Slovene poet (1800-1849)

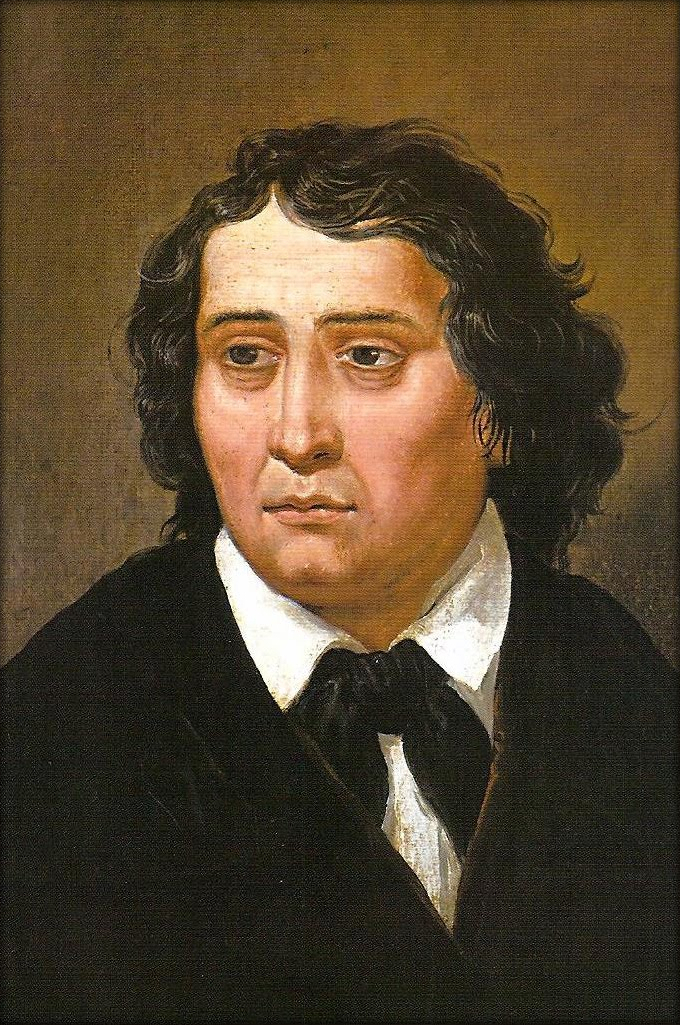
- Prešeren, 1850 oil portrait (Note: The only known portrait from memory of his actual appearance. After 1900, this served as the pattern for later depictions although its veracity has been doubted.)
- Born: 3 December 1800; Vrba, Carniola, Habsburg monarchy (now Slovenia)
- Died: 8 February 1849 (aged 48); Kranj, Austrian Empire (now Slovenia)
- Occupations: Poet, lawyer
- Writing career
- Language: Primarily Slovene, some works in German.
- Notable works: The Baptism on the Savica; O Vrba; Sonnets of Misfortune; A Wreath of Sonnets; Zdravljica
- Movement: Romanticism

Signature
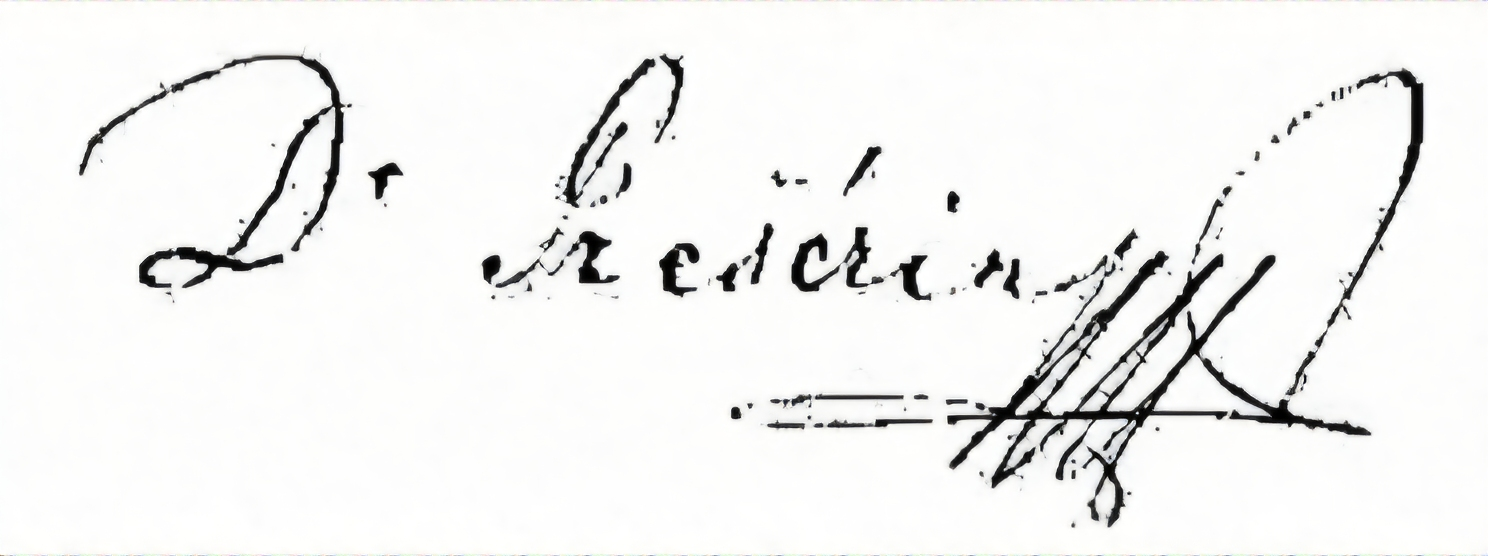

France Prešeren (Note: In his home village he was also known as Ribčev France.) (pronounced [fɾanˈtsɛ́ pɾɛˈʃèːɾən]) (3 December 1800 – 8 February 1849) was a Slovene poet whose works are widely considered some of the most important in Slovene literature. His poems have been translated into many languages.

He has been considered the greatest Slovene classical poet and has inspired later Slovene literature. After his death, he became the leading name of the Slovene literary canon.

He tied together the motifs of his own unhappy love with that of an unhappy, subjugated homeland. Especially after World War II in the Slovene Lands, one of Prešeren's motifs, the "hostile fortune", has been adopted by Slovenes as a national myth, and Prešeren has been described as ubiquitous as the air in Slovene culture. (Note: Translator and a Slovene writer who writes in English, Erica Johnson Debeljak, has been quoted comparing the status of Prešeren in Slovene culture to an entity as ubiquitous as air, describing in her essay "Prešeren's air" how he is frequently referenced to as simply "the poet", the identity of whom is obvious to all but to the yet uninitiated into the Slovene culture.)

Prešeren lived in conflict with both the civil and religious establishment, as well as with the provincial bourgeoisie of Ljubljana. He developed severe alcoholism and tried to kill himself on at least two occasions, facing rejections and seeing most of his closest friends die tragically. His lyric poetry dealt with the love towards his homeland, the suffering humanity, as well as his unfulfilled love towards his muse, Julija Primic.

He wrote poetry primarily in Slovene, but also in German. He lived in Carniola and at first regarded himself a Carniolan, but gradually adopted a broader Slovene identity.

== Life ==
=== Early life and education ===
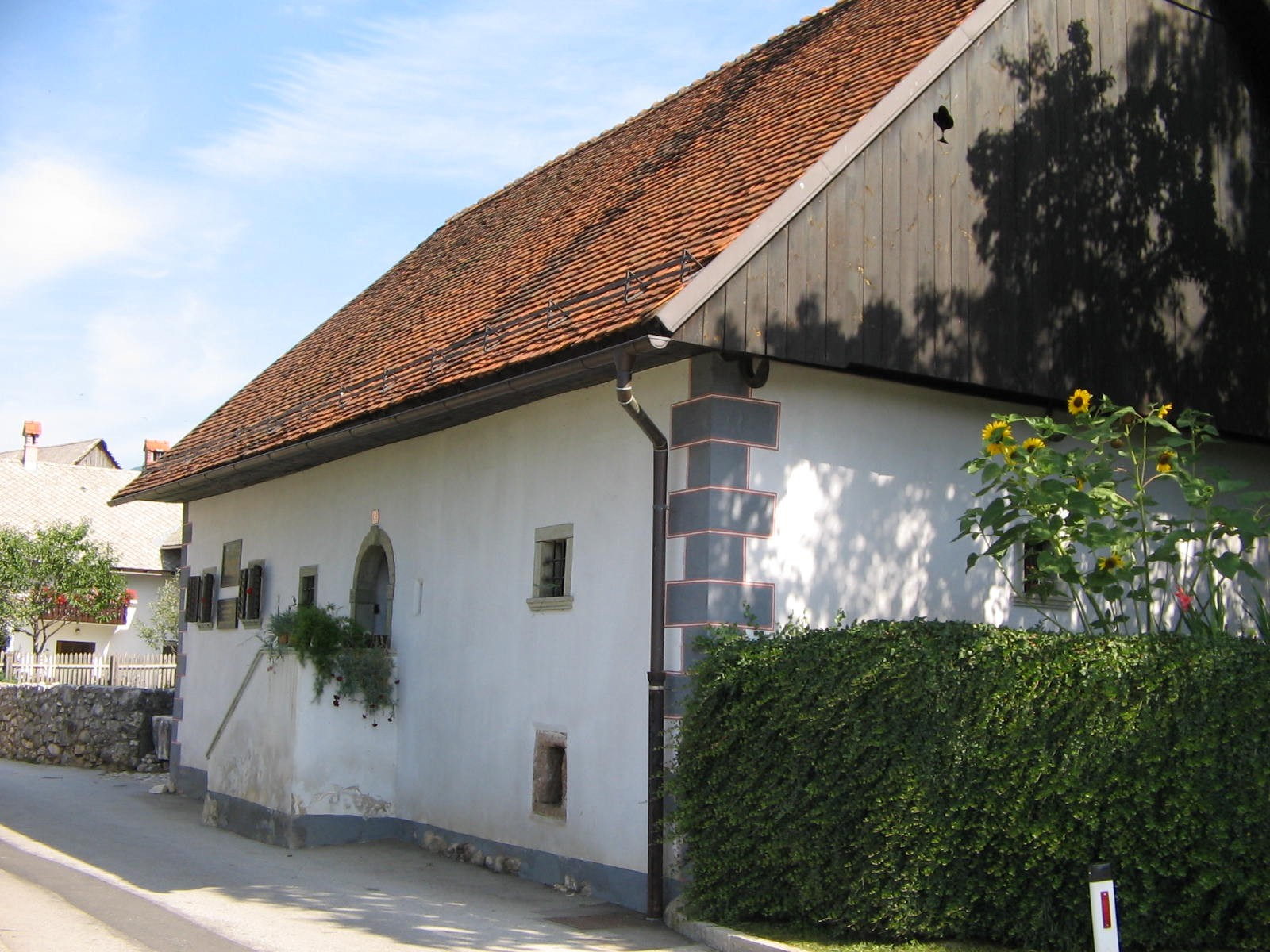
Prešeren's birthplace in Vrba

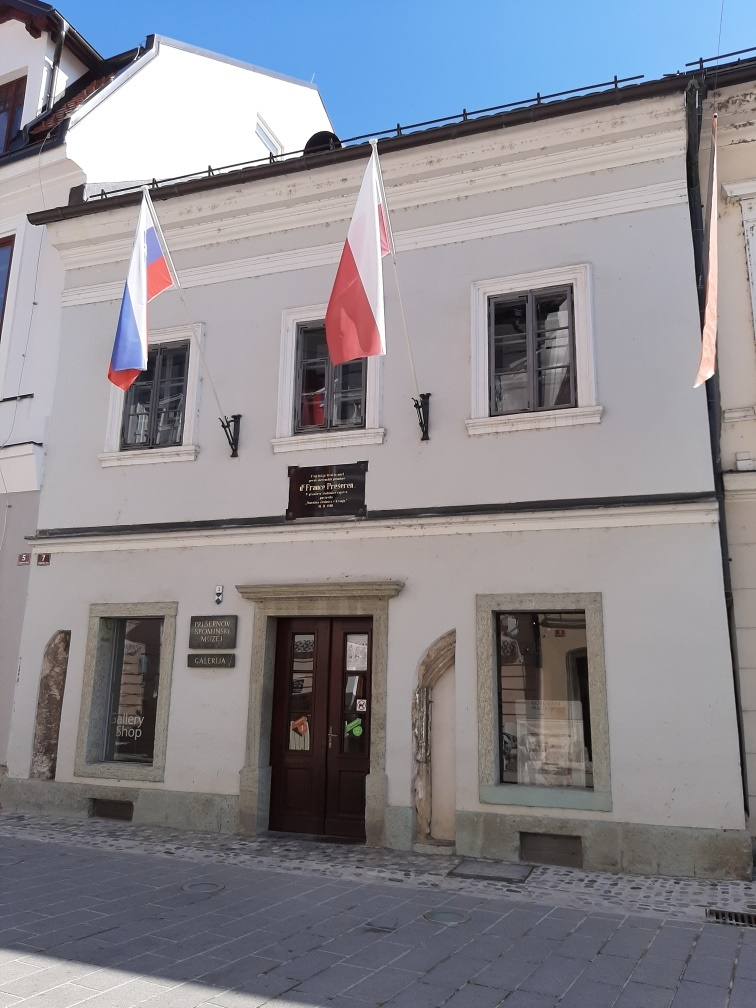
Prešeren's home in Kranj

France Prešeren was born in the Upper Carniolan village of Vrba, then part of the Habsburg monarchy (today in Slovenia), as the third of eight children and the first son in the family of a well-off farmer and an ambitious and better educated mother who taught her children to write and read and soon sent them to their uncles who were Roman Catholic priests.

At the age of eight, he was sent to elementary schools in Grosuplje and Ribnica, run by the local Roman Catholic clergy. In 1812, he moved to the Carniolan provincial capital of Ljubljana, where he attended the State Gymnasium. He learned Latin, Ancient Greek, and German, which was then the language of education, administration, and high culture in most areas inhabited by Slovenes.

In Ljubljana, Prešeren's the poet Valentin Vodnik encouraged him to develop his literary skills in Slovene. As a high school student, he became friends with the future philologist Matija Čop.

In 1821, Prešeren enrolled at the University of Vienna, where he studied law. In Vienna, he studied the western canon including Homer, Goethe, Dante, and the Italian trecentists, especially Petrarch and Boccaccio. He also read contemporary Romantic poets, and he was fired from a teaching post at Klinkowström's Jesuit institute for having lent a booklet of banned poetry to his friend Anastasius Grün.

=== Later life ===
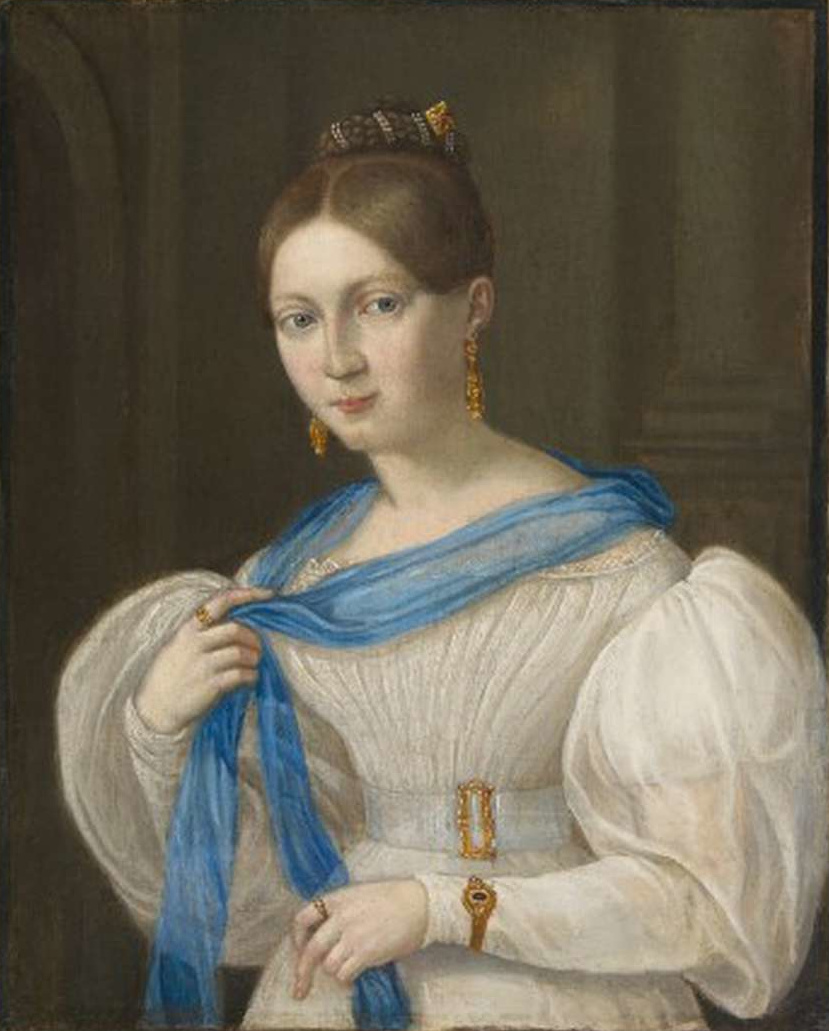
Prešeren's muse, Julija Primic, in a portrait by Matevž Langus

After acquiring a law degree in 1828, he returned to Ljubljana, where he was employed as an assistant in the firm of the lawyer Leopold Baumgartner. He constantly strove to become an independent lawyer, filing as many as six applications, but he was not successful. In 1832, he briefly moved to Klagenfurt in the hope of furthering his career, but returned to Ljubljana after less than a year. In the spring of 1833, in the morning of 6 April, Easter Saturday, he supposedly met Julija Primic, the daughter of a rich merchant, who would become the unfulfilled love of his life. In 1833, he became a member of the Ljubljana high society's social club, called the Casino Society (Slovene: Kazinsko društvo, German: Casino-Gesellschaft), and met Julija in 1834 and 1835 at the theatre and at the dances at the Casino Building, but did not have the courage to directly show her his feelings towards her. In 1834, he began working as an assistant to his friend Blaž Crobath, who gave Prešeren enough free time to engage in his literary activities. In the same year, he met the Czech romantic poet Karel Hynek Mácha and the Slovene-born Croatian poet Stanko Vraz and had long and fruitful discussions on poetry with them.

Around 1836, Prešeren finally realized that his love for Julija would never become mutual (she had married another man the previous year). The same year, he met Ana Jelovšek, with whom he entered into a permanent relationship. They had three children, but never married. Prešeren supported Ana financially and treated her as his rightful mate, but engaged in several other love affairs at the same time. He also spent a lot of time travelling throughout Carniola, especially to Lake Bled, from the scenery of which he drew inspiration for his poems. In 1846, Prešeren was finally allowed to open his own law firm and moved to Kranj with his family. He died there on 8 February 1849. Upon his deathbed he confessed that he had never forgotten Julija.

== Work ==
=== Early years ===
Prešeren's first serious poetic attempts date from his student years in Vienna. In 1824, he wrote some of his most popular poems, still under the influence of Valentin Vodnik and the rich tradition of Slovene folk poetry. In 1825, he completed a collection of "Carniolan poems," which he showed to the philologist Jernej Kopitar. Kopitar was very critical of the young man's literary attempts, and so Prešeren destroyed the entire collection. Kopitar's rejection hindered the development of Prešeren's creativity; he did not publish anything more until 1827, when his satirical poem "To Maidens" (Dekletom) was published by the German-language newspaper Illyrisches Blatt (Illyrian News). In 1828, Prešeren wrote his first important poem, "A Farewell to Youth." However, it was published only in 1830, in the literary almanac Krajnska čbelica (The Carniolan Bee), established the same year by the librarian Miha Kastelic in Ljubljana. The journal published another well-known poem by Prešeren that year, the first Slovene ballad. It was titled "The Water Man" (Povodni mož) and was a narration about Urška, a flirt from Ljubljana that ended in the hands of a handsome man who happened to be a water man.

In 1830, his friend from high school, Matija Čop, returned to Ljubljana and re-established contacts with Prešeren. Čop soon recognized his friend's poetic talent and persuaded him to adopt Romanic poetic forms. Following Čop's advice, Prešeren would soon become a master of the sonnet. His poems were noticed by the Czech scholar František Čelakovský, who published several highly positive critiques of it. Čelakovský's praise was extremely important for Prešeren's self-esteem and gave him the strength to continue in the path on which Čop had orientated him.

=== The most productive years ===
Between 1830 and 1835, Prešeren composed his esthetically most accomplished poems, which were inspired by the setbacks in his personal life, especially by his unrequited love for Julija Primic. Prešeren followed Čop's advice and transformed Julija into a poetic figure, reminiscent of Dante's Beatrice and Petrarch's Laura.

==== A Wreath of Sonnets ====
A Wreath of Sonnets (Sonetni venec) is Prešeren's most important poem from his early period. It is a crown of 15 sonnets. It was published on 22 February 1834 in the Illyrian Paper. In it, Prešeren tied together the motifs of his own unhappy love with that of an unhappy, subjugated homeland. The poem was recognized as a masterpiece by Matija Čop, but it did not gain much recognition beyond the small circle around the journal Krajnska čbelica. Moreover, Julija was unimpressed. Understandably, Prešeren moved to more bitter verses.

==== Sonnets of Misfortune ====
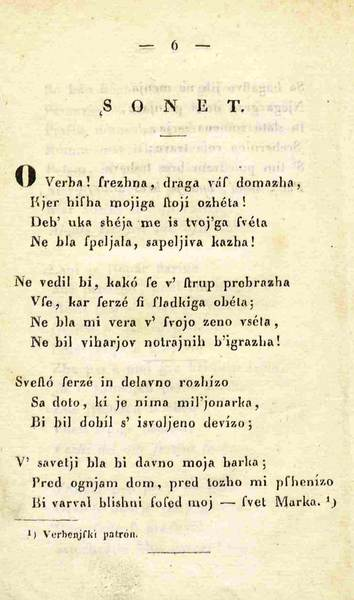
O Vrba, the first of the Sonnets of Misfortune, published in 1834 in the 4th volume of Krajnska čbelica

Another important work from this period are the "Sonnets of Misfortune" (Sonetje nesreče), which were first drafted already in 1832, but were published in the 4th volume of Krajnska čbelica only in July 1834, with some changes. They are the most pessimistic of Prešeren's works. This is a group of six (initially seven) sonnets expressing the poet's despair over life. In the first sonnet, titled "O Vrba," Prešeren reflects on what his life could have been like, had he never left his home village. The other sonnets from the circle have not gained such a widespread popularity, but are still considered by scholars to be among Prešeren's most genuine and profound works.

=== After Čop's death ===
1835 was Prešeren's annus horibilis. His closest friend Matija Čop drowned while swimming in the Sava River, Julija Primic married a wealthy merchant, and Prešeren became alienated from his friend and editor of the literary journal Krajnska čbelica, Miha Kastelic. Following his best friend's death, Prešeren wrote the epic-lyric poem The Baptism on the Savica (Krst pri Savici), dedicating it to Čop. Set during the forced Christianisation of the predecessors of Slovenes, the Carantanians, in the late 8th century, the poem addresses the issues of collective identity and faithfulness to the ancestors' ways, as well as the issue of individual and his hope and resignation. The philosopher Slavoj Žižek interpreted the poem as an example of the emergence of modern subjectivity.

In 1837, Prešeren met Emil Korytko, a Polish political activist from Galicia, confined by the Austrian authorities to Ljubljana. Korytko introduced to Prešeren the work of Adam Mickiewicz, which had an important influence on his later works. The two even jointly translated one of Mickiewicz's poems ("Resygnacja") from Polish to Slovene and started collecting Slovene folk songs in Carniola and Lower Styria. In 1839, Korytko died, leaving Prešeren without an important interlocutor after Čop's death.

In the autumn of the same year, Andrej Smole, one of Prešeren's friends from his youth, returned home after many years of living and travelling abroad. Smole was a relatively rich young intellectual from a well-established merchant family, who supported the development of Slovene culture. The two spent much of the winter of 1839–1840 on Smole's estate in Lower Carniola, where they planned several cultural and literary projects, including the establishment of a daily newspaper in Slovene and the publishing of Anton Tomaž Linhart's comedy Matiček's Wedding which had been prohibited as "politically inappropriate" in 1790, due to the outbreak of the French Revolution. Both projects failed: the planned journal Ilirske novice was blocked by the Viennese censorship, and Linhart's play would be staged only in 1848, without Prešeren's assistance. Smole died suddenly in 1840, literally in Prešeren's arms, while celebrating his 40th birthday. Prešeren dedicated a touching, yet unexpectedly cheerful and vitalist poem to his late friend.

=== Later work ===
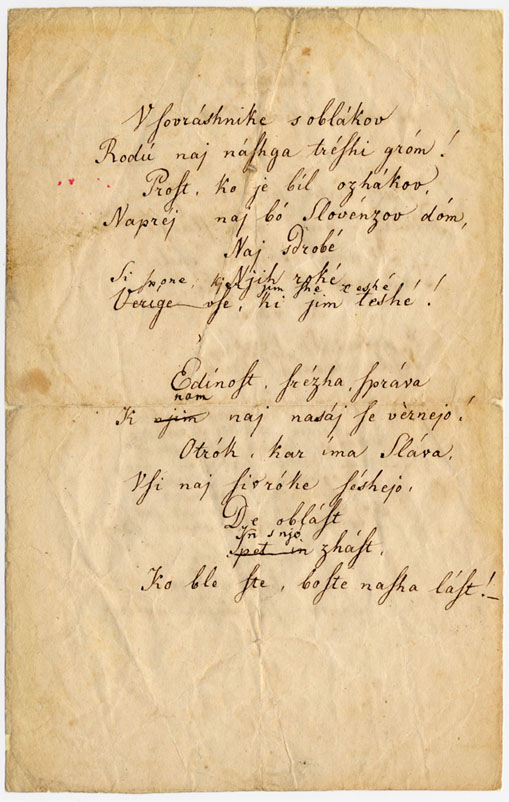
The original manuscript for Zdravljica, written in the old Slovene alphabet

After 1840, Prešeren was left without any interlocutor who could appreciate his works, but continued to write poetry, although much less than in the 1830s. He gradually departed from the typical romantic trend, adopting an increasingly diverse and innovative style. In 1843, an important breakthrough for Prešeren happened: Janez Bleiweis started publishing a new daily journal in Slovene and invited Prešeren to participate in its cultural section. The two men came from rather different backgrounds: Bleiweis was a moderate conservative and staunch supporter of the ecclesiastical and imperial establishments and alien to the Romantic culture. He nevertheless established a fair relationship with the poet. Prešeren's participation in Bleiweis' editorial project was the closest he would come to public recognition during his lifetime.

In 1844, he wrote the patriotic poem "Zdravljica" (A Toast), the most important achievement of his late period. In 1847, a volume of his collected poems was published under the simple title Poezije dr. Franceta Prešerna (Poems of Dr. France Prešeren).

Prešeren spent the last two years of his life occupied with private life and his new job as a lawyer in Kranj. According to some accounts, he was planning several literary projects, including a novel in the realistic style and an experimental play, but he was struck with liver disease caused by his excessive drinking in prior years. The revolution of 1848 left him rather indifferent, although it was carried out by the young generation who already saw him as an idol of democratic and national ideals. Before his death, he did however redact his Zdravljica, which was left out from the 1847 volume of poems, and made some minor adjustments for a new edition of his collected poems.

== Reception and influence ==
Today, Prešeren is still considered one of the leading poets of Slovene literature. Prešeren was also one of the greatest European Romanticists. His heartfelt lyrics and intensely emotional have made him the chief representative of the Romantic school in Slovenia.

Nevertheless, recognition came slowly after his death. It was not before 1866 that a real breakthrough in the reception of his role in Slovene culture took place. In that year, Josip Jurčič and Josip Stritar published a new edition of Prešeren's collection of poems. In the preface, Stritar published an essay which is still considered one of the most influential essays in Slovene history. In it, he showed the aesthetic value of Prešeren's work by placing him in the wider European context. From then on, his reputation as the greatest poet in Slovene was never endangered.

== Legacy ==
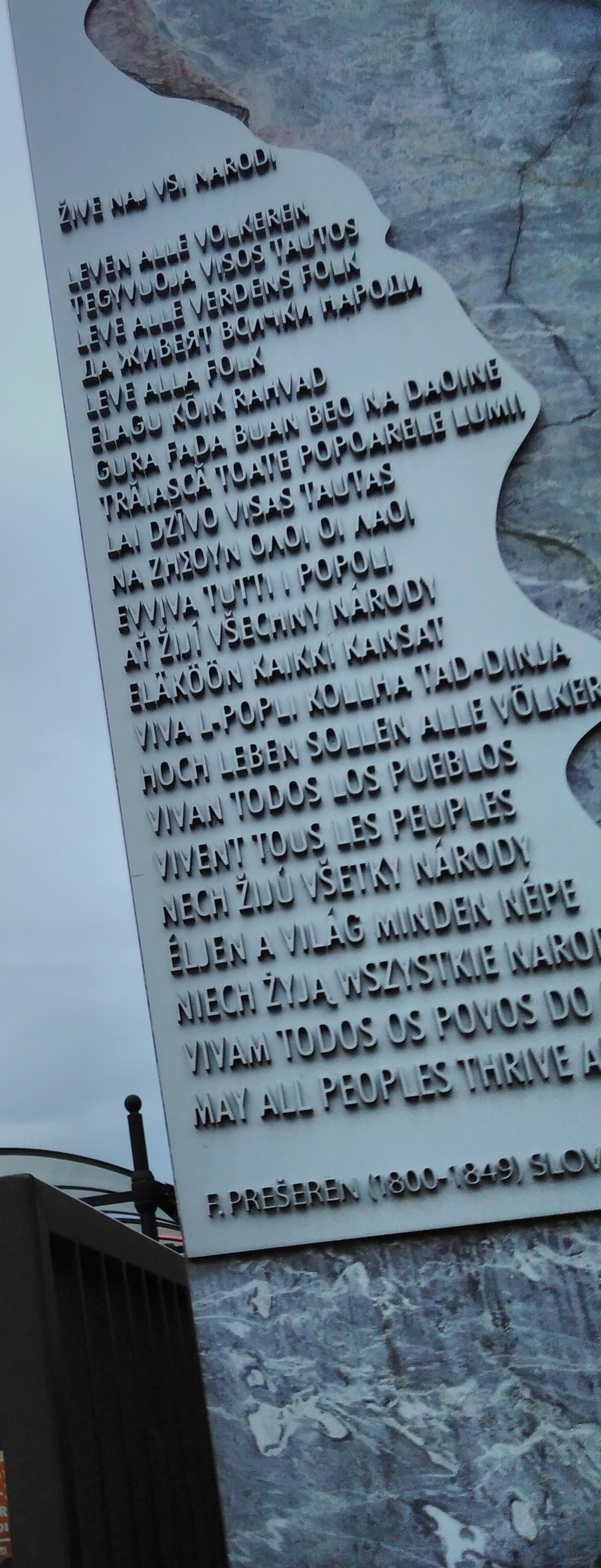
A memorial with “Žive naj vsi narodi” the first line of the Slovene national anthem by France Prešeren near the Schuman roundabout, Brussels.

Prešeren's legacy in Slovene culture is enormous. He is generally regarded as the national poet. In 1905, his monument was placed at the central square in Ljubljana, now called Prešeren Square. By the early 1920s, all his surviving work had been catalogued and numerous critical editions of his works had been published. Several scholars were already dealing exclusively with the analysis of his work and little was left unknown about his life. Slovene composer Breda Šček set his works to music. In 1945, the anniversary of his death, called Prešeren Day, was declared as the Slovene cultural holiday. In 1989, his Zdravljica was declared the national anthem of Slovenia, replacing the old Naprej, zastava slave. In 1992, his effigy was portrayed on the Slovene 1000 tolar banknote, and since 2007, his image is on the Slovene two-euro coin. The highest Slovene prize for artistic achievements, the Prešeren Award, is named after him.
