= Ales (given name) =

Ales (Belarusian: Алесь), also spelled Aleś in Łacinka, is a Belarusian masculine given name. It comes from the Greek name Alexander.

Notable people with the name include:

- Ales Adamovich (1927–1994), Soviet Belarusian writer, screenwriter, literary critic and democratic activist
- Ales Bachyla (1918–1983), Belarusian poet and playwright
- Ales Bialiatski (born 1962), Belarusian pro-democracy activist and prisoner of conscience
- Aleś Dudar (1904–1937), Belarusian poet, critic, translator and a victim of Stalin's purges
- Aleś Harun (1887–1920), Belarusian poet, prose writer, dramatist, lyricist and an opinion journalist
- Ales Michalevic (born 1975), Belarusian public figure and politician
- Ales Prudnikau (1910–1941), Belarusian poet
- Ales Pushkin (1965–2023), Belarusian non-conformist painter, theater artist, performer, art curator, and political prisoner
- Aleś Razanaŭ (1947–2021), Belarusian writer, poet and translator
- Ales Savitsky (1924–2015), Belarusian writer and public figure

== See also ==
- Oles (disambiguation)
- Aleš
- Ales (disambiguation)
- Ales (surname)
