= No Controles =

Single by Olé Olé

from the album Olé Olé
- Released: 1983
- Genre: Techno-pop
- Length: 3:02
- Label: CBS Records International
- Songwriter: Nacho Cano
- Producers: Nacho Cano, Jorge Álvarez

Olé Olé singles chronology
| "Dame" (1983) | "No Controles" (1983) | "Conspiración" (1983) |

"No Controles" is a song written by Nacho Cano, and recorded and released by the Spanish band Olé Olé in 1983.

The song translates as "Don't Control" in English, referring to a series of life choices that could possibly be controlled such as 'mi forma de pensar...vestir', "the way I think or dress".

== History ==
The song was first made popular in Spain and Europe in 1983 by the band Olé Olé, with Vicky Larraz on vocals.

In Latin America, particularly in Mexico, the song was made popular by the band Flans in 1985. Nacho Cano gave them the song because they were good friends. Later made popular by child Venezuelan band Payasitas Nifu Nifa, on their album Las Payasitas Ni Fu Ni Fa in 1995. It was later made popular by Mexico's Café Tacuba on their album of covers Avalancha de Éxitos in 1996.

Recently the song has been featured in the musical Hoy No Me Puedo Levantar also created by Nacho Cano.

It was also sung by Edurne in the TV Show Los Más de La Fiesta in Antena 3.

== In popular culture ==
The song appears in the 2018 video game, Just Cause 4 as a song that can play on the in game radio.
