= Aleš =

Aleš is a Czech and Slovenian name, appearing both as a male given name and a surname (Czech feminine: Alešová). It is a pet form of the names Alexej, Alexander, Alexius, etc. Notable people with the name include:

== Given name ==
- Aleš Bárta (born 1960), Czech organist
- Aleš Besta (born 1983), Czech footballer
- Aleš Brezavšček (born 1972), Slovenian alpine skier
- Aleš Brichta (born 1959), Czech singer
- Aleš Čeh (born 1968), Slovenian footballer
- Aleš Česen (born 1982), Slovenian climber and mountaineer
- Aleš Chvalovský (born 1979), Czech goalkeeper
- Aleš Debeljak (born 1961), Slovenian cultural critic and poet
- Aleš Dryml, Jr. (born 1979), Czech speedway rider
- Aleš Gorza (born 1980), Slovenian alpine skier
- Aleš Hemský (born 1983), Czech ice hockey player
- Aleš Hlad, Slovenian supermoto racer
- Aleš Hrdlička (1869–1943), Czech-American anthropologist
- Aleš Jindra (born 1973), Czech football coach and player
- Aleš Kačičnik (born 1973), Slovenian footballer
- Aleš Klégr (born 1951), Czech linguist
- Aleš Kokot (born 1979), Slovenian footballer
- Aleš Kotalík (born 1978), Czech ice hockey player
- Aleš Kranjc (born 1981), Slovenian ice hockey player
- Aleš Križan (born 1971), Slovenian footballer
- Aleš Kunaver (1943–2024), Slovenian alpinist
- Aleš Lamr (1943–2024), Czech artist
- Aleš Mandous (born 1992), Czech footballer
- Aleš Matějů (born 1996), Czech footballer
- Aleš Mejač (born 1983), Slovenian footballer
- Aleš Pajovič (born 1979), Slovenian handball player
- Aleš Pařez (born 1981), Czech ice hockey player
- Aleš Pipan (born 1959), Slovenian basketball coach and player
- Aleš Píša (born 1977), Czech ice hockey player
- Aleš Puš (born 1979), Slovenian footballer
- Aleš Razým (born 1986), Czech cross-country skier
- Aleš Řebíček (born 1967), Czech politician
- Aleš Šmon (born 1982), Slovenian footballer
- Aleš Šteger (born 1973), Slovenian poet and editor
- Aleš Svoboda (astronaut) (born 1986), Czech fighter pilot and astronaut
- Aleš Svoboda (linguist) (1941–2010), Czech linguist
- Aleš Urbánek (born 1980), Czech footballer
- Aleš Ušeničnik (1868–1952), Slovenian philosopher and sociologist
- Aleš Valenta (born 1973), Czech freestyle skier
- Aleš Veselý (1935–2015), Czech sculptor
- Aleš Vodseďálek (born 1985), Czech Nordic combined skier

== Surname ==
- Mikoláš Aleš (1852–1913), Czech painter

== See also ==
- Ales (disambiguation)
- Josef Aleš-Lyžec (1862–1927), Czech teacher and sportsman
