= Ales (surname) =

Ales is a surname. Notable people with the surname include:

- Alexander Ales (1500–1565), Scottish theologian
- Barney Ales (1934–2020), American music industry executive
- John Ales (born 1969), American actor

== See also ==
- Oles (disambiguation)
- Aleš
- Ales (disambiguation)
- Ales (given name)
