= Olé Olé =

Olé Olé or Ole Ole may refer to:

- Olé Olé (band), a 1980s Spanish pop music group
  - Olé Olé (Olé Olé album), 1983
- Olé Olé, a 1978 album and song by Charo
- Olé, Olé (Izhar Cohen song), the Israeli entry in the 1985 Eurovision Song Contest
- "Ole ole", a song by Rokeri s Moravu from their 1988 album Jugoslovenska Ploča
- Ole ole, a 1989 VHS album by Rokeri s Moravu
- "Ole Ole", a Hindi song from the 1994 film Yeh Dillagi
- Olé, Olé (Rachid Taha album), 1995 album by French-Algerian singer
- "Olé Olé", a 2019 song by German rapper Mero

== See also ==
- "Olé, Olé, Olé", football chant
- Ajax, Olé Olé Olé, a 1969 song by Willy Alberti sung with the Supporters of the Dutch association football club AFC Ajax
- Top of the World (Olé, Olé, Olé), 1998 single by Chumbawamba
- Loving You (Ole Ole Ole), a song by Brian Harvey
