= List of Esta historia me suena episodes =

Esta historia me suena is a Mexican anthology television series produced by Genoveva Martínez for Televisa.

As of 18 August 2023, 168 episodes of Esta historia me suena have aired, concluding the sixth season.

== Series overview ==
| Season | Episodes | Originally released | |
| Season | Episodes | First released | Last released |
|---|---|---|---|
| 1 | 30 | 13 May 2019 | 28 June 2019 |
| 2 | 15 | 18 December 2019 | 22 March 2020 |
| 3 | 38 | 5 August 2020 | 25 September 2020 |
| 4 | 30 | 26 July 2021 | 3 September 2021 |
| 5 | 25 | 13 June 2022 | 15 July 2022 |
| 6 | 30 | 10 July 2023 | 18 August 2023 |

== Episodes ==
=== Season 1: Vol. 1 (2019) ===
| No. overall | No. in season | Title | Directed by | Written by | Original release date | MEX viewers (millions) |
|---|---|---|---|---|---|---|
| 1 | 1 | "Adelante corazón" | Emmanuel Duprez | Gabriel Santos | 13 May 2019 (Note: Premiered early online through Las Estrellas website and YouTube channel on 9 May 2019.) | 2.5 |
| 2 | 2 | "Reggaetón Lento" | Alan Coton | Itzia Pintado | 14 May 2019 | 2.6 |
| 3 | 3 | "Yo No Sé Mañana" | Rodrigo Koelliker | Carlos Pérez Ortega | 15 May 2019 | 2.3 |
| 4 | 4 | "Despacito" | Emmanuel Duprez | Kerim Martínez | 16 May 2019 | 2.5 |
| 5 | 5 | "17 años" | Luis Vélez | Gabriel Santos | 17 May 2019 | 2.7 |
| 6 | 6 | "Échame la Culpa" | Rodrigo Koelliker | Tonantzin García | 20 May 2019 | 2.2 |
| 7 | 7 | "Robarte un Beso" | Rodrigo Koelliker | Kerim Martínez | 21 May 2019 | 2.1 |
| 8 | 8 | "Me Muero" | Emmanuel Duprez | Gabriel Santos | 22 May 2019 | 2.4 |
| 9 | 9 | "3 a.m." | Rodrigo Koelliker | Kerim Martínez | 23 May 2019 | 2.2 |
| 10 | 10 | "Ya es muy tarde" | Rodrigo Koelliker | Tonantzin García | 24 May 2019 | 2.4 |
| 11 | 11 | "100 años" | Rodrigo Koelliker | Carlos Pérez Ortega | 27 May 2019 | N/A |
| 12 | 12 | "El gran varón" | Jorge Senyal | Carlos Pérez Ortega | 28 May 2019 | N/A |
| 13 | 13 | "Perro Fiel" | Alejandro Ramírez | Elvin Rivera Ortega | 29 May 2019 | N/A |
| 14 | 14 | "Nada" | Emmanuel Duprez | Carlos Pérez Ortega | 30 May 2019 | N/A |
| 15 | 15 | "Me haces tanto bien" | Luis Vélez | Gabriel Santos | 31 May 2019 | N/A |
| 16 | 16 | "Con los ojos cerrados" | Rodrigo Koelliker | Tonantzin García | 3 June 2019 | N/A |
| 17 | 17 | "Me soltaste" | Rodrigo Koelliker | Carlos Pérez Ortega | 4 June 2019 | N/A |
| 18 | 18 | "Regálame" | Rodrigo Koelliker | Gabriel Santos | 5 June 2019 | N/A |
| 19 | 19 | "Cómo te voy a olvidar" | Jorge Senyal | Itzia Pintado | 7 June 2019 | N/A |
| 20 | 20 | "Bajo el agua" | Alejandro Gamboa | Gabriel Santos | 10 June 2019 | N/A |
| 21 | 21 | "Pasos de cero" | Emmanuel Duprez | Elvin Rivera Ortega | 11 June 2019 | N/A |
| 22 | 22 | "Todavía" | Jorge Senyal | Itzia Pintado | 13 June 2019 | N/A |
| 23 | 23 | "Me niego" | Alan Coton | Tonantzin García | 14 June 2019 | N/A |
| 24 | 24 | "A un minuto de ti" | Luis Vélez | Kerim Martínez | 18 June 2019 | N/A |
| 25 | 25 | "Y tú te vas" | Carlos Ángel Guerra Villarreal | Tonantzin García | 19 June 2019 | N/A |
| 26 | 26 | "Equivocada" | Emmanuel Duprez | Kerim Martínez | 21 June 2019 | N/A |
| 27 | 27 | "Una Lady Como Tú" | Alejandro Ramírez | Alfredo Ballesteros | 25 June 2019 | N/A |
| 28 | 28 | "Calma" | Alan Coton | Carlos Pérez Ortega | 26 June 2019 | N/A |
| 29 | 29 | "Odio Amarte" | Emmanuel Duprez | Itzia Pintado | 27 June 2019 | N/A |
| 30 | 30 | "Cruz de navajas" | Emmanuel Duprez | Carlos Pérez Ortega | 28 June 2019 | N/A |

=== Season 2: Vol. 2 (2019–20) ===
| No. overall | No. in season | Title | Directed by | Written by | Original release date | MEX viewers (millions) |
|---|---|---|---|---|---|---|
| 31 | 1 | "En el muelle de San Blas" | Emmanuel Duprez | Carlos Pérez Ortega | 18 December 2019 (Note: Premiered early online through Las Estrellas website and YouTube channel on 13 December 2019.) | 2.4 |
| 32 | 2 | "Aléjate de mí" | Alan Coton | Pablo Zuack | 19 December 2019 | N/A |
| 33 | 3 | "Quién como tú" | Alejandro Gamboa | Gabriel Santos | 20 December 2019 | N/A |
| 34 | 4 | "Simplemente amigos" | Rodrigo Koelliker | Camila Villagrán | 2 January 2020 | N/A |
| 35 | 5 | "El color de tus ojos" | Alejandro Gamboa | Paulina González Martínez | 3 January 2020 | 2.6 |
| 36 | 6 | "No Controles" | Jorge Senyal | Elizabeth Cruz | 7 January 2020 | 2.7 |
| 37 | 7 | "¿Qué Me Faltó?" | Alejandro Gamboa | Carlos Pérez Ortega | 8 January 2020 | 2.7 |
| 38 | 8 | "La Mejor Versión de Mí" | Rodrigo Koelliker | Elvin Rivera Ortega | 9 January 2020 | 2.8 |
| 39 | 9 | "Qué bello" | Emmanuel Duprez | Carlos Pérez Ortega | 10 January 2020 | 2.7 |
| 40 | 10 | "Como Tu Mujer" | Rodrigo Koelliker | Paulina González Martínez | 13 January 2020 | 2.5 |
| 41 | 11 | "Más Fuerte De Lo Que Pensaba" | Alan Coton | Carlos Pérez Ortega | 14 January 2020 | 3.3 |
| 42 | 12 | "Bazar" | Rodrigo Koelliker | Tonantzin García | 15 January 2020 | 3.1 |
| 43 | 13 | "Mujer contra mujer" | Emmanuel Duprez | Rodrigo Koelliker | 16 January 2020 | 3.0 |
| 44 | 14 | "La llave" | Jorge Senyal | Itza Pintado | 17 January 2020 | 3.2 |
| 45 | 15 | "Mientes tan bien" | Rodrigo Koelliker | Tonantzin García | 22 March 2020 | 2.2 |

=== Season 3: Vol. 3 (2020) ===
| No. overall | No. in season | Title | Directed by | Written by | Original release date | MEX viewers (millions) |
|---|---|---|---|---|---|---|
| 46 | 1 | "Esta historia me suena" | Rodrigo Koelliker | Gabriel Santos | 5 August 2020 (Note: Premiered early online through Las Estrellas website on 31 July 2020.) | 3.0 |
| 47 | 2 | "Amigos no por favor" | Emmanuel Duprez | Elvin Rivera Ortega | 6 August 2020 | 3.0 |
| 48 | 3 | "Loco" | Alejandro Gamboa | Elvin Rivera Ortega | 7 August 2020 | 2.6 |
| 49 | 4 | "Con todos menos conmigo" | Carlos Guerra Villarreal | Itzia Pintado | 10 August 2020 | 3.1 |
| 50 | 5 | "No es serio este cementerio" | Alan Coton | Pablo Zuack | 11 August 2020 | 3.1 |
| 51 | 6 | "A partir de hoy" | Carlos Guerra Villarreal | Kerim Martínez | 12 August 2020 | 2.8 |
| 52 | 7 | "Me cuesta tanto olvidarte" | Alejandro Ramírez | Itza Pintado | 13 August 2020 | 2.9 |
| 53 | 8 | "Castillos" | Alejandro Ramírez | Kerim Martínez | 14 August 2020 | 2.6 |
| 54 | 9 | "Amiga mía" | Alejandro Gamboa | Kerim Martínez | 17 August 2020 | 2.8 |
| 55 | 10 | "El reloj Cucú" | Emmanuel Duprez | Gabriel Santos | 18 August 2020 | 2.5 |
| 56 | 11 | "Corre" | Emmanuel Duprez | Catalina Álvarez Watson | 19 August 2020 | 3.0 |
| 57 | 12 | "Como quien pierde la estrella" | Rodrigo Koelliker | Kerim Martínez | 20 August 2020 | 2.7 |
| 58 | 13 | "Ni tú ni nadie" | Rodrigo Koelliker | Paulina González Martínez | 21 August 2020 | 3.0 |
| 59 | 14 | "Que lloro" | Luis Vélez | Rodrigo Koelliker | 24 August 2020 | 2.7 |
| 60 | 15 | "Tú lo decidiste" | Emmanuel Duprez | Gabriel Santos | 25 August 2020 | 2.6 |
| 61 | 16 | "Devuélveme a mi chica" | Emmanuel Duprez | Carlos Pérez Ortega | 26 August 2020 | 2.6 |
| 62 | 17 | "¿Cómo pudiste hacerme esto a mí?" | Alan Coton | Itzia Pintado | 27 August 2020 | 2.8 |
| 63 | 18 | "A puro dolor" | Rodrigo Koelliker | Elvin Rivera Ortega | 28 August 2020 | 2.5 |
| 64 | 19 | "Sería más facil" | Alan Coton | Catalina Álvarez Watson | 31 August 2020 | 2.6 |
| 65 | 20 | "Yo no te pido la luna" | Rodrigo Koelliker | Elvin Rivera Ortega | 1 September 2020 | 2.4 |
| 66 | 21 | "Por amarte así" | Luis Vélez | Rodrigo Koelliker | 2 September 2020 | 2.7 |
| 67 | 22 | "Un buen perdedor" | Luis Vélez | Tonantzin García | 3 September 2020 | 2.8 |
| 68 | 23 | "Amores extraños" | Alan Coton | Tonantzin García | 4 September 2020 | 2.6 |
| 69 | 24 | "La puerta del colegio" | Alan Coton | Carlos Pérez Ortega | 7 September 2020 | 2.8 |
| 70 | 25 | "Bella señora" | Emmanuel Duprez | Kerím Martínez | 8 September 2020 | 2.8 |
| 71 | 26 | "La puerta negra" | Alan Coton | Camila Villagrán | 9 September 2020 | 2.9 |
| 72 | 27 | "Que nadie sepa mi sufrir" | Emmanuel Duprez | Carlos Pérez Ortega | 10 September 2020 | 3.0 |
| 73 | 28 | "Mi historia entre tus dedos" | Rodrigo Koelliker | Tonantzin García | 11 September 2020 | 2.8 |
| 74 | 29 | "Si yo fuera mujer" | Rodrigo Koelliker | Itzia Pintado | 14 September 2020 | 2.9 |
| 75 | 30 | "Tres veces te engañe" | Alejandro Gamboa | Gabriel Santos | 15 September 2020 | 2.8 |
| 76 | 31 | "La negra Tomasa" | Alejandro Gamboa | Carlos Pérez Ortega | 16 September 2020 | 2.8 |
| 77 | 32 | "Dígale" | Alan Coton | Elvin Rivera Ortega | 17 September 2020 | 2.7 |
| 78 | 33 | "Las mil y una noches" | Alan Coton | Paulina González Martínez | 18 September 2020 | 2.5 |
| 79 | 34 | "Ya te olvidé" | Rodrigo Koelliker | Catalina Álvarez Watson | 21 September 2020 | 2.9 |
| 80 | 35 | "Prefiero ser su amante" | Emmanuel Duprez | Gabriel Santos | 22 September 2020 | 2.7 |
| 81 | 36 | "Amor prohibido" | Álex Ramírez | Camila Villagrán | 23 September 2020 | 2.7 |
| 82 | 37 | "Aunque no sea conmigo" | Emmanuel Duprez | Rodrigo Koelliker | 24 September 2020 | 2.8 |
| 83 | 38 | "Lobo" | Alejandro Gamboa | Kerím Martínez | 25 September 2020 | 2.8 |

=== Season 4: Vol. 4 (2021) ===
| No. overall | No. in season | Title | Directed by | Written by | Original release date | MEX viewers (millions) |
|---|---|---|---|---|---|---|
| 84 | 1 | "Tiempos mejores" | Emmanuel Duprez | Kerím Martínez | 26 July 2021 (Note: Premiered early online through Las Estrellas website on 22 July 2021.) | 2.5 |
| 85 | 2 | "Que no quede huella" | Emmanuel Duprez | Carlos Pérez Ortega | 27 July 2021 | 2.6 |
| 86 | 3 | "Pobre de ti" | Alejandro Ramírez | Carlos Pérez Ortega | 28 July 2021 | 2.8 |
| 87 | 4 | "Sergio el bailador" | Alejandro Ramírez | Rodrigo Koelliker | 29 July 2021 | 2.9 |
| 88 | 5 | "Besos de ceniza" | Alejandro Gamboa | Elizabeth Cruz | 30 July 2021 | 2.7 |
| 89 | 6 | "La de la mala suerte" | Alan Coton | Catalina Álvarez Watson | 2 August 2021 | 2.7 |
| 90 | 7 | "La Mentira" | Emmanuel Duprez | Gabriel Santos | 3 August 2021 | 2.6 |
| 91 | 8 | "Me dediqué a perderte" | Alejandro Gamboa | Catalina Álvarez Watson | 4 August 2021 | 2.5 |
| 92 | 9 | "El Espejo" | Emmanuel Duprez | Rodrigo Koelliker | 5 August 2021 | 2.7 |
| 93 | 10 | "Me he enamorado de un fan" | Rodrigo Koelliker | Elvin Rivera Ortega | 6 August 2021 | 2.4 |
| 94 | 11 | "Adiós amor" | Alejandro Ramírez | Carlos Pérez Ortega | 9 August 2021 | 2.8 |
| 95 | 12 | "La Lola" | Alejandro Gamboa | Gabriel Santos | 10 August 2021 | 2.8 |
| 96 | 13 | "Cuando un hombre te enamora" | Alejandro Gamboa | Kerim Martínez | 11 August 2021 | 2.7 |
| 97 | 14 | "Suelta mi mano" | Alejandro Gamboa | Elvin Rivera Ortega | 12 August 2021 | 2.6 |
| 98 | 15 | "Por tu maldito amor" | Alan Coton | Gabriel Santos | 13 August 2021 | 2.3 |
| 99 | 16 | "Amanecí en tus brazos" | Alan Coton | Itzia Pintado | 16 August 2021 | 2.5 |
| 100 | 17 | "Corazones invencibles" | Rodrigo Koelliker | Carlos Pérez Ortega | 17 August 2021 | 2.5 |
| 101 | 18 | "La calle de las sirenas" | Alejandro Gamboa | Paulina González Martínez | 18 August 2021 | 2.8 |
| 102 | 19 | "Limón y sal" | Alejandro Gamboa | Elvin Rivera Ortega | 19 August 2021 | 2.7 |
| 103 | 20 | "Enloquéceme" | Rodrigo Koelliker | Rodrigo Koelliker | 20 August 2021 | 2.6 |
| 104 | 21 | "El Rey azul" | Rodrigo Koelliker | Tonantzin García | 23 August 2021 | 2.6 |
| 105 | 22 | "Cobarde" | Alejandro Ramírez | Paulina González Martínez | 24 August 2021 | 2.5 |
| 106 | 23 | "Me plantó" | Rodrigo Koelliker | Camila Villagrán | 25 August 2021 | 2.7 |
| 107 | 24 | "No prometas lo que no será" | Alan Coton | Itzia Pintado | 26 August 2021 | 2.6 |
| 108 | 25 | "Lloran mis muñecas" | Alan Coton | Tonantzin García | 27 August 2021 | 2.6 |
| 109 | 26 | "Pobre niña rica" | Alan Coton | Camila Villagrán | 30 August 2021 | 2.6 |
| 110 | 27 | "El Diablo" | Emmanuel Duprez | Tonantzin García | 31 August 2021 | 2.9 |
| 111 | 28 | "La Cama" | Álex Ramírez | Catalina Álvarez Watson | 1 September 2021 | 2.4 |
| 112 | 29 | "Te aprovechas de mí" | Emmanuel Duprez | Carlos Pérez Ortega | 2 September 2021 | 2.6 |
| 113 | 30 | "Todo todo todo" | Rodrigo Koelliker | Kerim Martínez | 3 September 2021 | 2.7 |

=== Season 5: Vol. 5 (2022) ===
| No. overall | No. in season | Title | Directed by | Written by | Original release date | MEX viewers (millions) |
|---|---|---|---|---|---|---|
| 114 | 1 | "Creo en mí" | Rodrigo Koelliker | Kerím Martínez | 13 June 2022 (Note: Premiered early online through Las Estrellas website on 9 June 2022.) | 2.4 |
| 115 | 2 | "Una hora más" | Alan Coton | Santiago Mesa | 14 June 2022 | 2.6 |
| 116 | 3 | "Leona dormida" | Rodrigo Koelliker | Rodrigo Koelliker | 15 June 2022 | 2.6 |
| 117 | 4 | "Creo en ti" | Álex Ramírez | Elvin Rivera Ortega | 16 June 2022 | 2.2 |
| 118 | 5 | "Ingobernable" | Jorge Senyal | Santiago Mesa | 17 June 2022 | 2.2 |
| 119 | 6 | "Torero" | Emmanuel Duprez | Gabriel Santos | 20 June 2022 | 2.5 |
| 120 | 7 | "Maquillaje" | Rodrigo Koelliker | Camila Villagrán | 21 June 2022 | 2.5 |
| 121 | 8 | "Con la misma piedra" | Emmanuel Duprez | Carlos Pérez Ortega | 22 June 2022 | 3.1 |
| 122 | 9 | "Te voy a perder" | Álex Ramírez | Rodrigo Koelliker | 23 June 2022 | 2.3 |
| 123 | 10 | "Shabadabada" | Rodrigo Koelliker | Tonantzin García | 24 June 2022 | 2.0 |
| 124 | 11 | "Dos mujeres, un camino" | Jorge Senyal | Paulina González Martínez | 27 June 2022 | 2.5 |
| 125 | 12 | "¿Dónde estás, Yolanda?" | Jorge Senyal | Álex Ramírez | 28 June 2022 | 2.5 |
| 126 | 13 | "Me gusta" | Emmanuel Duprez | Carlos Pérez Ortega | 29 June 2022 | 2.5 |
| 127 | 14 | "Juegos de amor" | Alan Coton | Elvin Rivera Ortega | 30 June 2022 | 2.0 |
| 128 | 15 | "Una aventura" | Jorge Senyal | Itzia Pintado | 1 July 2022 | 2.3 |
| 129 | 16 | "Que lo nuestro se quede en nuestro" | Rodrigo Koelliker | Carolina Álvarez Watson | 4 July 2022 | 2.5 |
| 130 | 17 | "Siempre a mí" | Jorge Senyal | Andrea Marra | 5 July 2022 | 2.7 |
| 131 | 18 | "Libre" | Álex Ramírez | Camila Villagrán | 6 July 2022 | 2.5 |
| 132 | 19 | "Perdono y olvido" | Álex Ramírez | Itzia Pintado | 7 July 2022 | 2.4 |
| 133 | 20 | "Vive" | Jorge Senyal | Tonantzin García | 8 July 2022 | 2.2 |
| 134 | 21 | "Cruz de olvido" | Emmanuel Duprez | Carlos Pérez Ortega | 11 July 2022 | 2.9 |
| 135 | 22 | "Un día más de vida" | Alan Coton | Tonantzin García | 12 July 2022 | 2.4 |
| 136 | 23 | "Si nos dejan" | Alan Coton | Gabriel Santos | 13 July 2022 | 2.5 |
| 137 | 24 | "Nada fue un error" | Rodrigo Koelliker | Catalina Álvarez Watson | 14 July 2022 | 2.6 |
| 138 | 25 | "Pienso en ti" | Emmanuel Duprez | Kerím Martínez | 15 July 2022 | 2.3 |

=== Season 6: Vol. 6 (2023) ===
| No. overall | No. in season | Title | Directed by | Written by | Original release date | Mexico viewers (millions) |
|---|---|---|---|---|---|---|
| 139 | 1 | "Escándalo" | Carlos Santos | Tonantzin García | 10 July 2023 | 2.2 |
| 140 | 2 | "Culpable o inocente" | Carlos Santos | Kerim Martínez | 11 July 2023 | 2.0 |
| 141 | 3 | "Ya pasará" | Hildebrando Carballido | Carlos Pérez Ortega | 12 July 2023 | 2.2 |
| 142 | 4 | "Rosa Pastel" | Hildebrando Carballido | Catalina Álvarez Watson | 13 July 2023 | 2.2 |
| 143 | 5 | "No huyas de mí" | Alan Coton | Camila Villagrán | 14 July 2023 | 2.0 |
| 144 | 6 | "Yo no me doy por vencido" | Salvador Aguirre | Andrea Marra | 17 July 2023 | 2.3 |
| 145 | 7 | "Como me haces falta" | Héctor Márquez | Carlos Pérez Ortega | 18 July 2023 | 2.2 |
| 146 | 8 | "Mis sentimientos" | Hildebrando Carballido | Kerim Martínez | 19 July 2023 | 1.9 |
| 147 | 9 | "Pedro Navaja" | Jorge Senyal | Elvin Rivera | 20 July 2023 | 2.1 |
| 148 | 10 | "¿Te ha pasado?" | Hildebrando Carballido | Elvin Rivera Ortega | 21 July 2023 | 1.8 |
| 149 | 11 | "Los caminos de la vida" | Héctor Márquez | Renata Orozco | 24 July 2023 | 2.3 |
| 150 | 12 | "Golpes en el corazón" | Alan Coton | Camila Villagrán | 25 July 2023 | 2.3 |
| 151 | 13 | "A una señora" | Alan Coton | Santiago Mesa | 26 July 2023 | 2.6 |
| 152 | 14 | "Déjala tranquila" | Eduardo Said | Tonantzin García | 27 July 2023 | 2.0 |
| 153 | 15 | "Mariposa Traicionera" | Hildebrando Carballido | Andrea Marra | 28 July 2023 | 1.9 |
| 154 | 16 | "Mis impulsos sobre ti" | Carlos Santos | Itzia Pintado | 31 July 2023 | 2.2 |
| 155 | 17 | "Almohada" | Unknown | Itzia Pintado | 1 August 2023 | 2.4 |
| 156 | 18 | "Louis" | Hildebrando Carballido | Pablo Zuack | 2 August 2023 | 2.0 |
| 157 | 19 | "Contrabando y traición" | Salvador Aguirre | Carlos Pérez Ortega | 3 August 2023 | 2.2 |
| 158 | 20 | "Mala hierba" | Alan Coton | Carlos Pérez Ortega | 4 August 2023 | 1.9 |
| 159 | 21 | "¿Cómo pagarte?" | Salvador Aguirre | Catalina Álvarez Watson | 7 August 2023 | 2.1 |
| 160 | 22 | "Yo quisiera" | Alan Coton | Catalina Álvarez Watson | 8 August 2023 | 2.3 |
| 161 | 23 | "Si no te hubieras ido" | Unknown | Elvin Rivera | 9 August 2023 | 2.0 |
| 162 | 24 | "Mi último viaje" | Alexander Aranda | Gabriel Santos | 10 August 2023 | 2.5 |
| 163 | 25 | "Fabricando fantasías" | Alexander Aranda | Carlos Pérez Ortega | 11 August 2023 | 2.4 |
| 164 | 26 | "Aunque ahora estés con él" | Hildebrando Carballido | Alex Ramírez | 14 August 2023 | 2.5 |
| 165 | 27 | "Tus jefes no me quieren" | Alex Ramírez | Carlos Pérez Ortega | 15 August 2023 | 2.2 |
| 166 | 28 | "Sin Sentimientos" | Héctor Márquez | Renata Orozco | 16 August 2023 | 2.2 |
| 167 | 29 | "Cuando mueres por alguien" | Héctor Márquez | Elizabeth Cruz | 17 August 2023 | 2.3 |
| 168 | 30 | "Matador" | Jorge Senyal | Santiago Mesa | 18 August 2023 | 2.1 |
