= The Thorny Rose =

- Written by: Libretto by A. Bachyla
- Genre: Comic opera

The Thorny Rose is an opera by composer Y. V. Semyanyaka, with a libretto by A. Bachyla, first performed in 1960 under the direction of conductor Valery Dmitrievich Ruter [ru; Valery D. Ruter]. It was the first national comic opera.

== Description ==
The Thorny Rose was the first opera in Belarus to focus on a contemporary plot, about students, their friendships, love, disappointments, and hopes. The opera showcased the composer's melodic gift and accuracy of musical characterization.

== Cast ==
- Lavon Burak – A. M. Savchenko
- Svyatlana – T. I. Shymko (the first performer), I. S. Shikunova
- Malvina – L. I. Galushkina
- Andrey – V. I. Glushakov (the first performer)
- Irina – T. M. Nizhnikova (the first performer), L. I. Zlatova
- Ragneda Yanovna – S. Y. Drucker
- Taras – V. M. Chernobayev

== Reception ==
T. M. Nizhnikova played the role of Irina with great energy. The part was specifically written for her, and in some ways, even modeled on the character of the singer, who never "complained" but acted, inspiring the others with her energy.

The magazine "Soviet Music" noted:

The charming Irina as portrayed by T. Nizhnikova. Great musicality, purity of intonation, high vocal culture combined with a rare acting talent and sweet spontaneity on stage made this character almost central.

S. Drucker's portrayal of Ragneda Yanovna was the pinnacle of her comedic talent: a woman with a narrow-minded, bourgeois outlook, inventive and uncompromising when it came to "family interests."
