= Alexej =

Alexej is a given name. Notable people with the name include:

- Aleksej Aleksandrov (born 1973), Belarusian chess grandmaster
- Alexej Barchevitch (born 1976), Russian-born German violinist
- Alexej Baumgärtner (born 1988), German speed skater
- Alexej Čepička (1910–1990), Czech Communist politician
- Alexej Gerassimez (born 1987), German composer
- Alexej Ivanko (born 1949), Slovak lawyer and politician
- Alexej Jaškin (born 1965), Russian-born Czech ice hockey player
- Alexej von Jawlensky (1864–1941)
- Alexej Manvelov (born 1982), Swedish actor
- Alexej Pludek (1923–2002), Czech writer
- Alexej Prochorow, German weightlifter
- Alexej Stachowitsch (1918–2013), Russian-American educator

== See also ==
- Alexis
