= Ales =

Ales may refer to:

== Places ==
- Alès, a town and commune in France
- Ales, Sardinia, a town in Italy

== Names ==
- Ales (given name), a Belarusian given name
- Ales (surname), a surname
- Aleš, a Slavic given name and surname

== Other uses ==
- Ale, a fermented alcoholic beverage
- Ales (automobile), a 1920s Japanese automobile
- Ales Groupe, a French cosmetics company
- Olympique Alès, a French association football club based in Alès
