= Josef Aleš-Lyžec =

Czech teacher and sportsman (1862–1927)

Josef Aleš-Lyžec Czech pronunciation (1862 Písek – 27 September 1927 Boseň) was a Czech teacher and sportsman.

He was descendant of known south-Bohemian Aleš family, cousin of well-known painter Mikoláš Aleš and father of famous writer Josef Váchal (J. Aleš-Lyžec never married his mother Anna Váchalová, so his son got mother's name). He was great propagator of skiing (the old Czech word lyžec means Ski-Man in English).
