= Esta historia me suena =

Mexican anthology television series

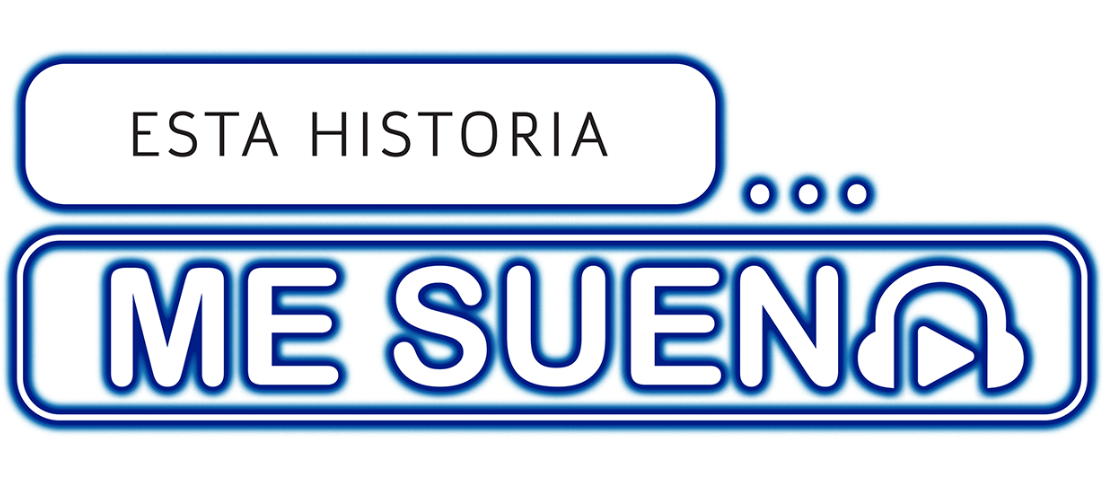
- Created by: Gabriel Santos; Carlos Pérez Ortega
- Directed by: Emmanuel Duprez
- Starring: María José; Jan Carlo Bautista
- Theme music composer: Paty Cantú; Ángela Dávalos
- Opening theme: "Esta historia me suena" by María José
- Country of origin: Mexico
- Original language: Spanish
- No. of seasons: 6
- No. of episodes: 168 (list of episodes)

Production
- Executive producer: Genoveva Martínez
- Producer: Emmanuel Duprez
- Editors: Erika Castañeda; Yuri Murua
- Camera setup: Multi-camera
- Production company: Televisa

Original release
- Network: Las Estrellas
- Release: 13 May 2019 – 18 August 2023

Esta historia me suena (English title: It Rings a Bell) is a Mexican anthology television series produced by Genoveva Martínez for Televisa, that premiered on Las Estrellas on 13 May 2019. The series stars María José and Jan Carlo Bautista. The series tackles intense current issues, with song titles inspiring an episode storyline.

The series has been renewed for a sixth season, which premiered on 10 July 2023.

== Premise ==
Each stand-alone episode addresses family and youth issues in a familiar and optimistic tone and features a song that inspires the episode’s storyline. The storyline leads to reflection between parents and children and how to resolve them in everyday life. The song accompanies and supports that story. Most episodes feature a flash mob that highlights the featured song.

== Production ==
Filming of the series began on 15 October 2018. The series was originally scheduled to premiere on 12 November 2018, however it was delayed because of problems with the rights of some songs used in the episodes.

== Episodes ==
Season	Episodes	Originally released	
Season	Episodes	First released	Last released
1	30	13 May 2019	28 June 2019
2	15	18 December 2019	22 March 2020
3	38	5 August 2020	25 September 2020
4	30	26 July 2021	3 September 2021
5	25	13 June 2022	15 July 2022
6	30	10 July 2023	18 August 2023

== Reception ==
The series premiered with a total of 2.5 million viewers. The first ten episodes aired weekdays at 6:30pm. Due to discreet audience data, on 27 May 2019 the rest of the first season moved to the 5:30pm timeslot.

=== Ratings ===
Viewership and ratings per season of Esta historia me suena
Season	Timeslot (CT)	Episodes	First aired		Last aired		Avg. viewers (millions)
Season	Timeslot (CT)	Episodes	Date	Viewers (millions)	Date	Viewers (millions)	Avg. viewers (millions)
1	Mon–Fri 6:30 pm (1–10); Mon–Fri 5:30 pm (11–30)	10 (Note: Should reflect the number of episodes that contribute to the average given in the last column.)	13 May 2019	2.5	28 June 2019	N/A	2.39
2	Mon–Fri 6:30 pm	12	18 December 2019	2.4	22 March 2020	2.2	2.77
3	Mon–Fri 6:30 pm	38	5 August 2020	3.0	25 September 2020	2.8	2.77
4	Mon–Fri 6:30 pm	30	26 July 2021	2.5	3 September 2021	2.7	2.63
5	Mon–Fri 6:30 pm	25	13 June 2022	2.4	15 July 2022	2.3	2.45
6	Mon–Fri 6:30 pm	30	10 July 2023	2.2	18 August 2023	2.1	2.18

== Awards and nominations ==
Year	Award	Category	Nominated	Result
2020	TVyNovelas Awards	Best Unit Program	Genoveva Martínez	Nominated
