= Oles =

Oles may refer to:

- Oles (given name)
  - Oles Berdnyk (1926–2003), Ukrainian writer, philosopher, theologian and public figure
  - Oles Buzina (1969–2015), Ukrainian journalist and writer
  - Oles Chishko (1895–1976), Ukrainian and Russian Soviet composer and singer
  - Oles Dovgiy (born 1980), Ukrainian businessman, politician and philanthropist
  - Oles Honchar (1918–1995), Soviet and Ukrainian writer and public figure
  - Oles Sanin (born 1972), Ukrainian filmmaker, actor, musician and sculptor
  - Oles Semernya (1936–2012), Ukrainian artist
  - Oles Ulianenko (1962–2010), Ukrainian writer
- Oles (surname)
  - Bartłomiej Oleś (born 1973), Polish musician and composer, brother of Marcin
  - Darek Oles, an alias of Darek Oleszkiewicz (born 1963), Polish-born musician, composer and educator in the United States
  - Leslie Oles (born 1990), Canadian ice hockey player
  - Marcin Oleś (born 1973), Polish musician and composer, brother of Bartłomiej
  - Marian Oleś (1934–2005), Polish Catholic clergyman
  - Oleksandr Oles (1878–1944), Ukrainian writer and poet
- Oles (Villaviciosa), a parish in Villaviciosa, Spain
- The nickname for athletic teams at St. Olaf College, Northfield, Minnesota, U.S.

== See also ==
- OLE (disambiguation)
- Ales (name)
- Olesya (disambiguation)
