= Radim (Jičín District) =

- Municipality
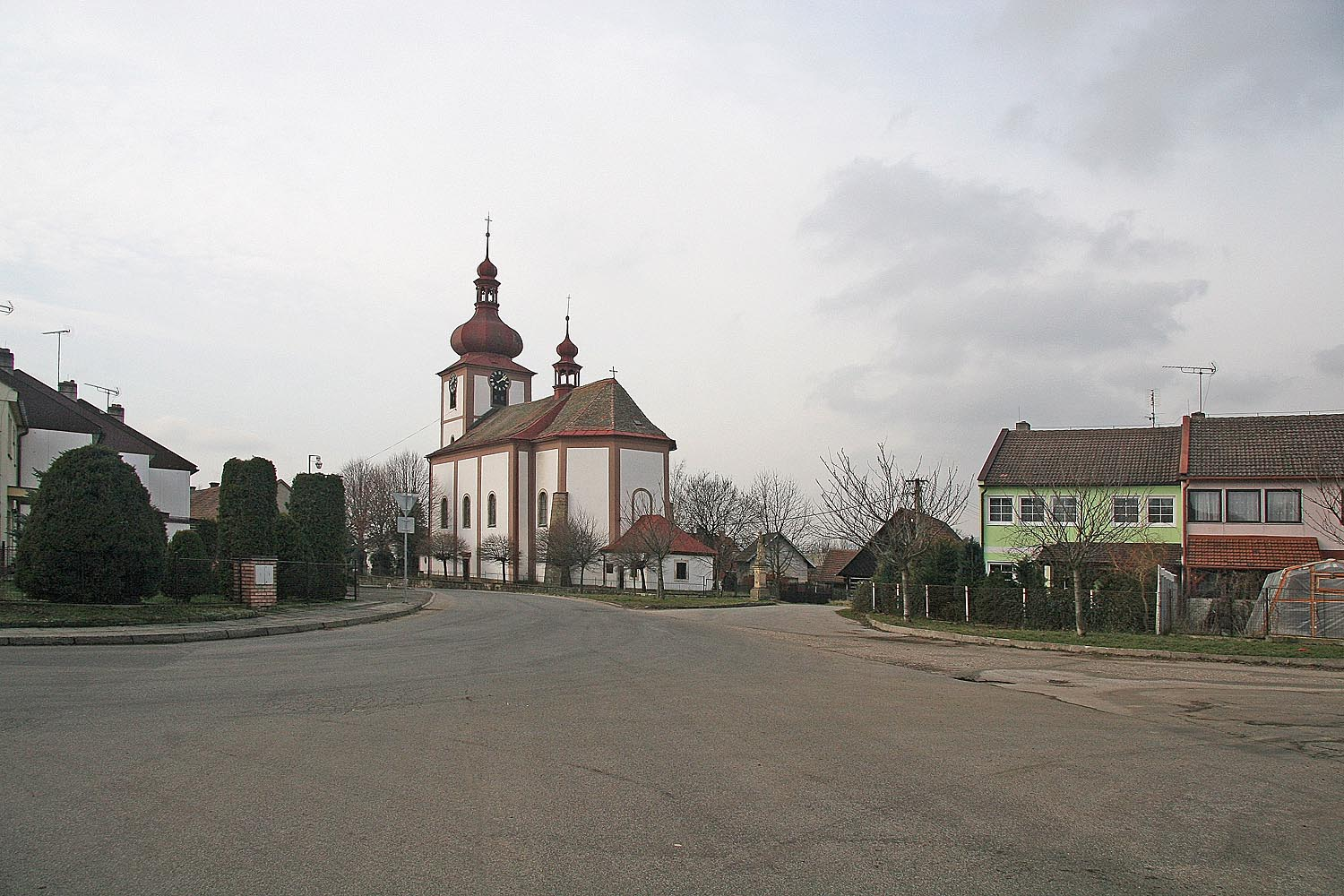
- Church of Saint George

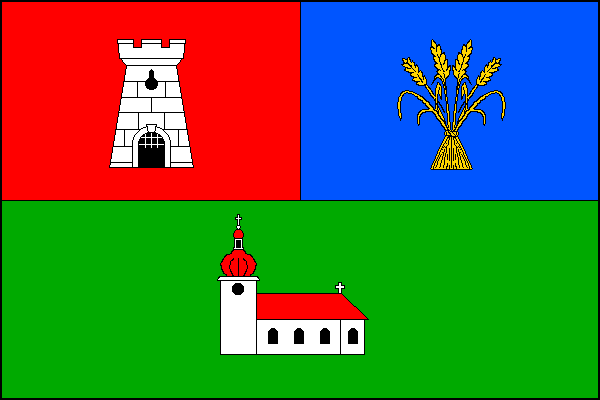
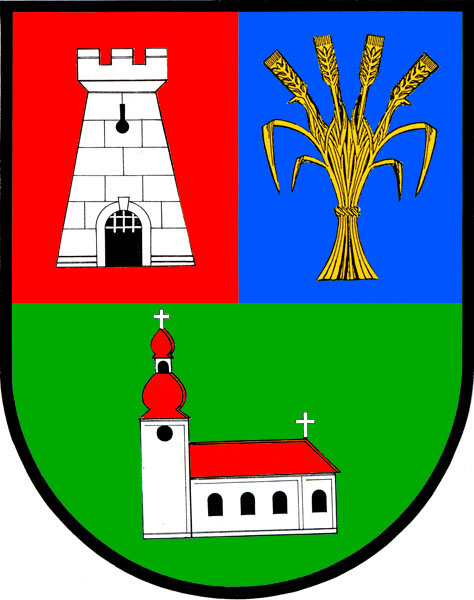
- Flag Coat of arms

- Location in the Czech Republic
- Coordinates: 50°27′32″N 15°25′43″E
- Country: Czech Republic
- Region: Hradec Králové
- District: Jičín
- First mentioned: 1360

Area
  - Total: 10.38 km^{2} (4.01 sq mi)
- Elevation: 306 m (1,004 ft)

Population (2026-01-01)
  - Total: 480
  - Density: 46/km^{2} (120/sq mi)
- Time zone: UTC+1 (CET)
  - Summer (DST): UTC+2 (CEST)
- Postal codes: 507 12, 507 13
- Website: www.obec-radim.cz

Radim is a municipality and village in Jičín District in the Hradec Králové Region of the Czech Republic. It has about 500 inhabitants.

== Administrative division ==
Radim consists of five municipal parts (in brackets population according to the 2021 census):

- Radim (246)
- Lháň (15)
- Podhájí (19)
- Studeňany (89)
- Tužín (46)

== Demographics ==
Historical population
Year	Pop.	±%
1869	1,392	—
1880	1,289	−7.4%
1890	1,225	−5.0%
1900	1,040	−15.1%
1910	1,074	+3.3%
1921	1,001	−6.8%
1930	829	−17.2%
1950	579	−30.2%
1961	518	−10.5%
1970	423	−18.3%
1980	372	−12.1%
1991	376	+1.1%
2001	362	−3.7%
2011	383	+5.8%
2021	415	+8.4%
Source: Censuses

== Notable people ==
- Josef Váchal (1884–1969), writer and painter; lived and died here
