= Pavel Kunaver =

Slovenian science writer (1889–1988)

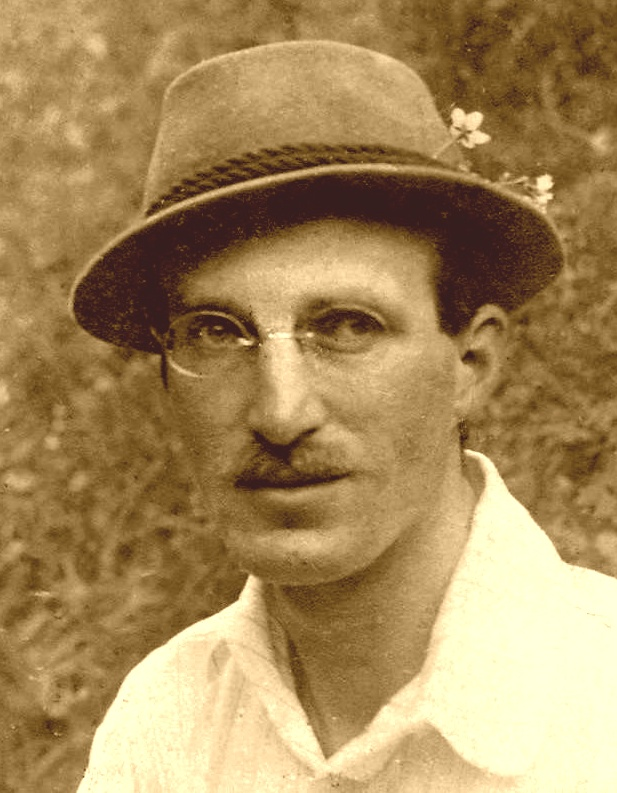
- Kunaver c. 1914
- Born: 19 December 1889; Ljubljana, Slovenia
- Died: 19 April 1988 (aged 98); Ljubljana, Slovenia
- Occupations: Pedagogue, speleologue, scout leader, writer of popular science books
- Spouse: Jeti Kunaver
- Writing career
- Notable awards: Levstik Award; 1981 for Pravljica in resnica o zvezdah (Fairytale and truth about stars)

Pavel Kunaver (19 December 1889 – 19 April 1988) was a Slovene pedagogue, writer of popular science books, geography, history and Slovene language teacher and pioneer of amateur astronomy, mountain climbing, skiing and caving in Slovenia.

== Life ==
Pavel Kunaver was born in the family of Franc Kunaver in Dobrova near Ljubljana, senior guard in the correctional facility and mother Celestina Pristav. There were five brothers and one sister in the family. In addition to Pavel, Jože /Josip Kunaver (1882–1967) is also known as a mountaineer and member of the mountain club Dren (he first brought the skis to Ljubljana, which Pavel also used)

Pavel Kunaver finished passed the State Teacher's Exam in 1910 and served until 1919 he served in primary schools around Ljubljana. Between 1912 and 1913 he completed a course non-state school teachers and from 1913 to 1914 studied geography at the teachers academy of the University of Vienna. He worked as a teacher for subjects of geography history and Slovenian.

In World War I he was a prisoner in the Russian captive camp Marchtrenk from 1915 to 1916. Later, from 1917 to 1918, he was - in the immediate hinterland of the Isonzo Front- a member of the military group cataloguing caves, first on the Karst Plateau around Doberdò del Lago, later mainly on the Trnovo Forest Plateau and on the Banjšice Plateau. Together with Michael Michler he de novo analyzed and catalogued over 100 karst caves. Familiar as he was with the Karst Plateau, he warned General Rudolf Maister about the risks of unfair demarcation between Italy and newly created Kingdom of Serbs, Croats and Slovenes and, at his own initiative, participated in a demarcation commission in one of the karst sectors of the new border.

After World War I, he taught geography at the second civic school in Spodnja Šiška (1919–1929), before becoming its principal (1929–1945). After World War II, he taught geography at Classical gymnasium (1945–1961) and then astronomy at Gimnasia Grammar School in Šentvid at Ljubljana (1961–1970).

== Extracurricular activities ==
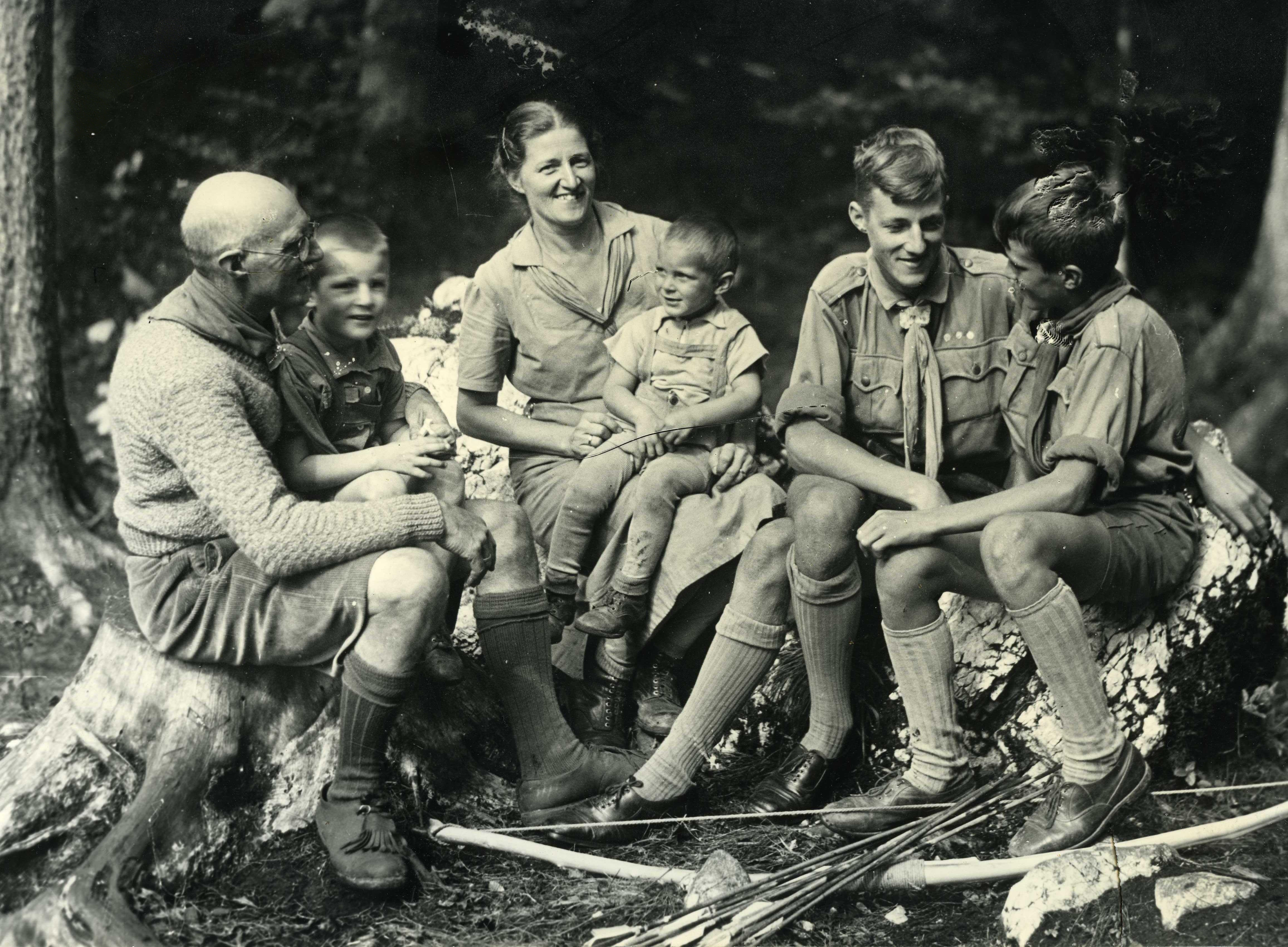
Pavel Kunaver z družino na skavtskem taboru (1938)

Pavel Kunaver had three main areas of interest: mountains, karst and caves, and astronomy. He studied, described, and illustrated the natural world and sought to promote interest in these subjects among others, particularly young people.

Around 1910, he and his friends joined the informal Dren (Die hard) mountain club, which before the first World War, was the first in Slovenia to focus on trekking climbing and mountain skiing. Together with his older brother Jože, his youthful mentor, he was one of the pioneers of skiing, mountaineering and cave exploration in Slovenia. With Ivan Kovač and Ivan Michler, he climbed the Slovenian direction of the Northwall of Triglav as the first team without a guide. as the member of the Dren club, he was also one of the founding members of the Society for the Exploration of Caves (1910). Until The first World War, he explored caves in the Lower Carniola, drawing cave plans and reporting on the seen, initially in the Laibacher Zeitung.

He described his experiences from this period mainly in the books. To mention are Into the mountains (Na planine), Ljubljana, 1921 and Through the Mountains and Valleys, Ljubljana 1923, which, like in 1922, published the first Slovene popular scientific book about Karst, The World of Karst, and later in 1932 The precipices, were a complete novelty to the Slovenian readership. Kunaver is also considered a pioneer of observing and describing the Triglav Glacier. He first mentioned it in his diary in 1905, and later, especially after World War II, he devoted many articles to it.

In 1923 he joined the Young Scout Organization as he saw it as an ideal form for raising the young people at that time. From then until World War II, he was the Scout Master of Slovenian Scouts. He attended several international scouting jamborees and conferences (Kandersteg, Switzerland, 1926; Arrow Park, Upton, Merseyside, England, 1929; Baden, Austria, 1931, Gödölö, Hungary, 1933) and thus came into contact with international scouting circles, further broadening the horizon. After the war, he was among the founding members of the Slovenian Scout Organization and the Senior Patrol Leader of two - Dragon and Grey Wolf - troops.

Pavel Kunaver did not see any significant difference in pedagogical activities on the school premises or outdoors when on camping, trips or excursions. In all the circumstances, he tried to give everything he could and could do the best so that even the young people who surrounded him could take as many experiences and impressions as possible from nature. He was the leader of numerous scout camps, as well as the organizer of many youth research camps and hundreds of tours. He also ran several research camps of The LePlay Society and The Brathay Hall Exploration Group – Rugby.

== Protection of natural heritage ==
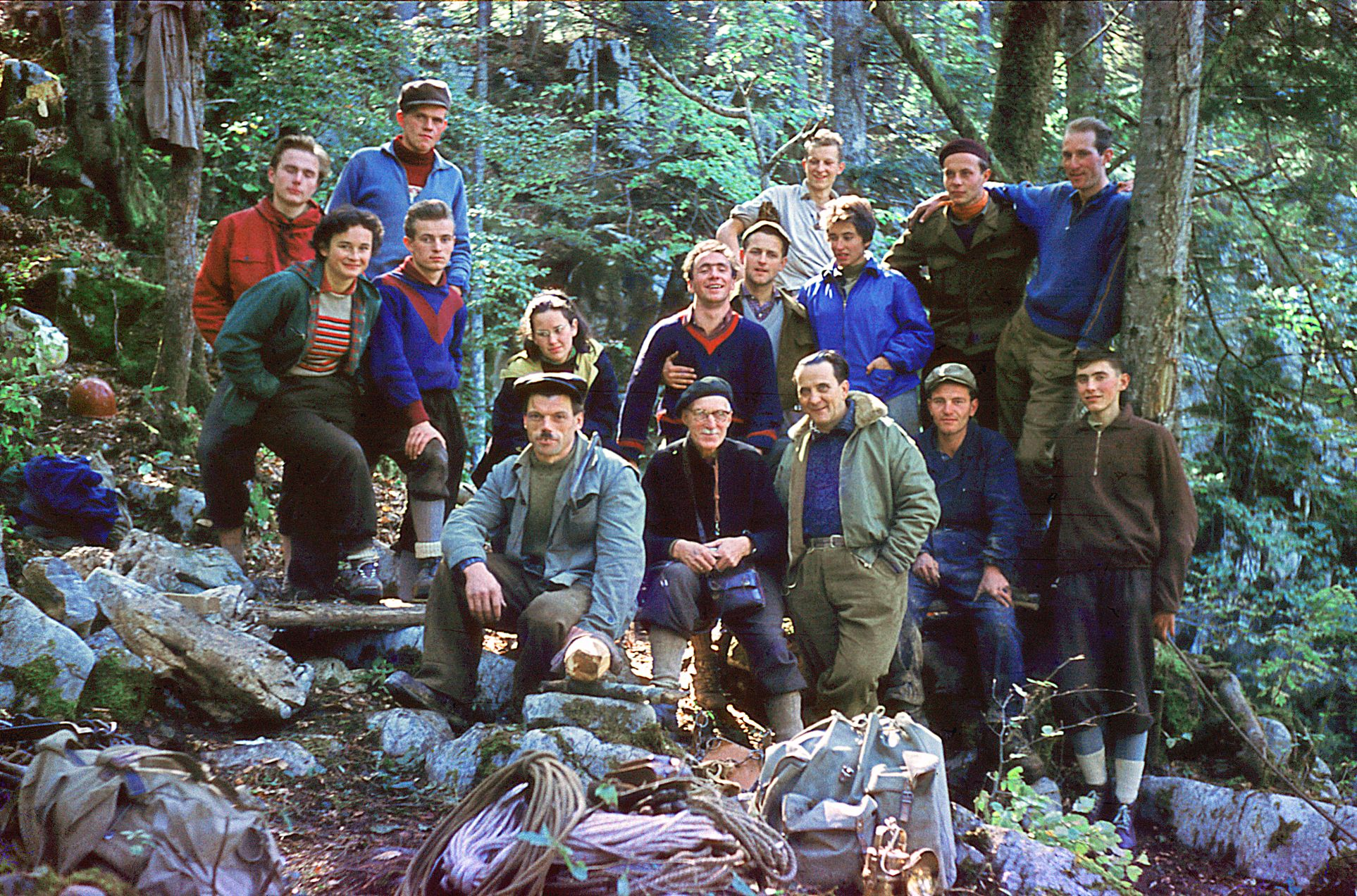
Kunaver with DZRJL team near Gradišnica Cave, 1957

Kunaver was one of the first fighters for the protection of natural heritage in Slovenia, especially for protection of Škocjan Caves from pollution of the Reka River, Postojna Cave and for the preservation of the Mountaineering Field and Lake Cerknica in their natural form. He is particularly well-deserved and celebrated with a public appeal for the conservation and protection of Lake Cerknica, which was at risk of artificial conservation in the late 1960s. He has previously campaigned in public against the use of Triglav and its surroundings as a ski tourist resort and against the use of the waters of Lake Bohinj, Kamnik Bistrica and Soca for hydroelectric power plants. For several years (from 1962 onwards) he headed the Commission for the Protection of Caves and Cave Tourism. In 1912 he became the leader of cave exploration at Ljubljana Cave Exploration Society (DZRJL) (founded in 1910), after DZRJL secretary Josip Cerk perished in a snow blizzard on top of Mt. Stol.

In the aftermath of World War II the revival of DZRJL was to a great extent based on establishing middle school caving clubs, which Kunaver promoted with great success.

== Astronomy ==
As one of the pioneers of popular astronomy in Slovenia, he promoted astronomical knowledge, especially among the young, with a written and spoken word, also on the radio. For pedagogical purposes he founded the first astronomical observatories in Slovenia, first at the civic school in Zgornja Šiška (1939) and after the war at the Montanistic Institute, at the gimnazija in Šubičeva ulica, on the roof of the Vega factory and at the gymnasium in Šentvid. From 1939 onwards, he carried out regular astronomical observations of the Sun's activity for several decades and sent the data to the center in Zurich. He also wrote eight popular books in astronomy and a number of articles in magazines like in Planinski Vestnik and Proteus, in newspapers and in radio.

He won the Levstik Award in 1981 for his book Pravljica in resnica o zvezdah (The Story and Truth About the Stars).

His son Jurij Kunaver, teaching geography at the University of Ljubljana, has written a book about his father (Pavel Kunaver - Sivi volk : pričevanja o vzgojitelju, geografu, alpinistu drenovcu, jamarju, skavtu - taborniku, astronomu, umetniku, naravovarstveniku in pisatelju, 2018). Another son, Aleš Kunaver, is among the top Slovenian alpinists.

== Selected works ==
- Na planine (Into the Hills), 1921
- Po gorah in dolinah (In the Hills and In the Valleys), 1923
- Zadnja pot kapitana Scotta (Captain Scott's Last Journey), 1926
- V prepadih (Amid Precipices), 1932
- Skozi led in sneg (Through Ice and Snow), 1944
- Sprehodi po nebu (Walks Across the Sky), 1944
- Pastir v Zlatorogovem kraljestvu (The Sheapherd in Goldhorn's Kingdom), 1945
- Potovanje po nebu (Travelling the Sky), 1951
- Nebo nad nami (The Sky Above Us), 1956
- Kraški svet in njegovi pojavi (Karst world and its phenomena), 1957
- Neizprosen sever (Relentless North), 1958
- Cerkniško jezero (lake Cerknica), 1961
- Brezna in vrhovi (Peaks and Abysses), 1974
- Kažipot po nebu (A Guide to the Sky), 1974
- Moje steze (My Paths), 1979
- Pravljica in resnica o zvezdah (The Story and Truth About the Stars), 1981
