= Ole =

OLE, Ole or Olé may refer to:

- Olé, a cheering expression used in Spain
- Ole (name), a male given name, includes a list of people named Ole
- Overhead line equipment, in railway electrification

== Computing, mathematics, and engineering ==
- Object locative environment coordinate system
- Object Linking and Embedding, a distributed object system and protocol developed by Microsoft
  - OLE Automation, an inter-process communication mechanism developed by Microsoft
- Olé, Spanish search engine which became part of Telefónica's portal Terra in 1999

== People ==
- Ole (name)

== Places ==
- Ole, Estonia, Hiiu County, a village
- Õle, Järva County, Estonia, a village
- Ole, Zanzibar, Tanzania, a village
- Ole, Mathura district, India, a village
- OLE, IATA airport code for Cattaraugus County-Olean Airport, New York, United States
- Ole Miss, University of Mississippi, Oxford, Mississippi, United States

== Music ==
- Olé Coltrane, an album by John Coltrane, 1962
- Olé (Johnny Mathis album), 1965
- Olé (Azúcar Moreno album), 1998
- "¡Olé!", a song by The Bouncing Souls from their 1999 album Hopeless Romantic
- Olé (Pearl Jam song), 2011
- "Olé" (Adelén song), 2014
- "Olé" (John Newman song), 2016

== Arts ==
- Olé (group), an international musical comedy trio, formed in 1992
- Olé, a 2006 Italian comedy film
- "Olé!", an episode of Hi Hi Puffy AmiYumi

== Other ==
- Olé (sports newspaper), a morning daily Spanish language sports newspaper from Argentina
- Olé Football Academy, an association football academy based in Wellington, New Zealand
- ʼOle language, Sino-Tibetan language spoken in western Bhutan
- Ole (cantillation), a cantillation mark ("goes up") found in Psalms, Proverbs, and Job
- National Oceanic and Atmospheric Administration Fisheries Office of Law Enforcement, often abbreviated NOAA OLE
- Other Learning Experience, one of the components in the Hong Kong Diploma of Secondary Education
- Singapore-Cambridge GCE Ordinary Level, a standardized examination in Singapore

== See also ==
- Olé Olé (disambiguation)
- "Olé, Olé, Olé", a popular football chant
- Olleh, South Korean e-sports player currently associated with Team Liquid
