= Olesya =

Olesya may refer to:

- Olesya (given name)
- Olesya (novel), an 1898 novelette by Alexander Kuprin
- Olesya (film), a 1971 drama film

== See also ==
- Oles (disambiguation)
