= Josef Váchal =

Czech writer and painter (1884 - 1969)

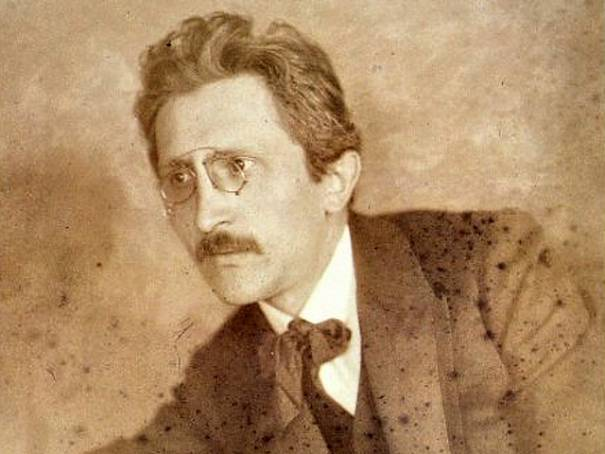
Váchal in the 1920s

Josef Váchal (23 September 1884 in Milavče near Domažlice – 10 May 1969 in Studeňany) was a Czech writer, painter, printmaker and book-printer.

== Life and work ==
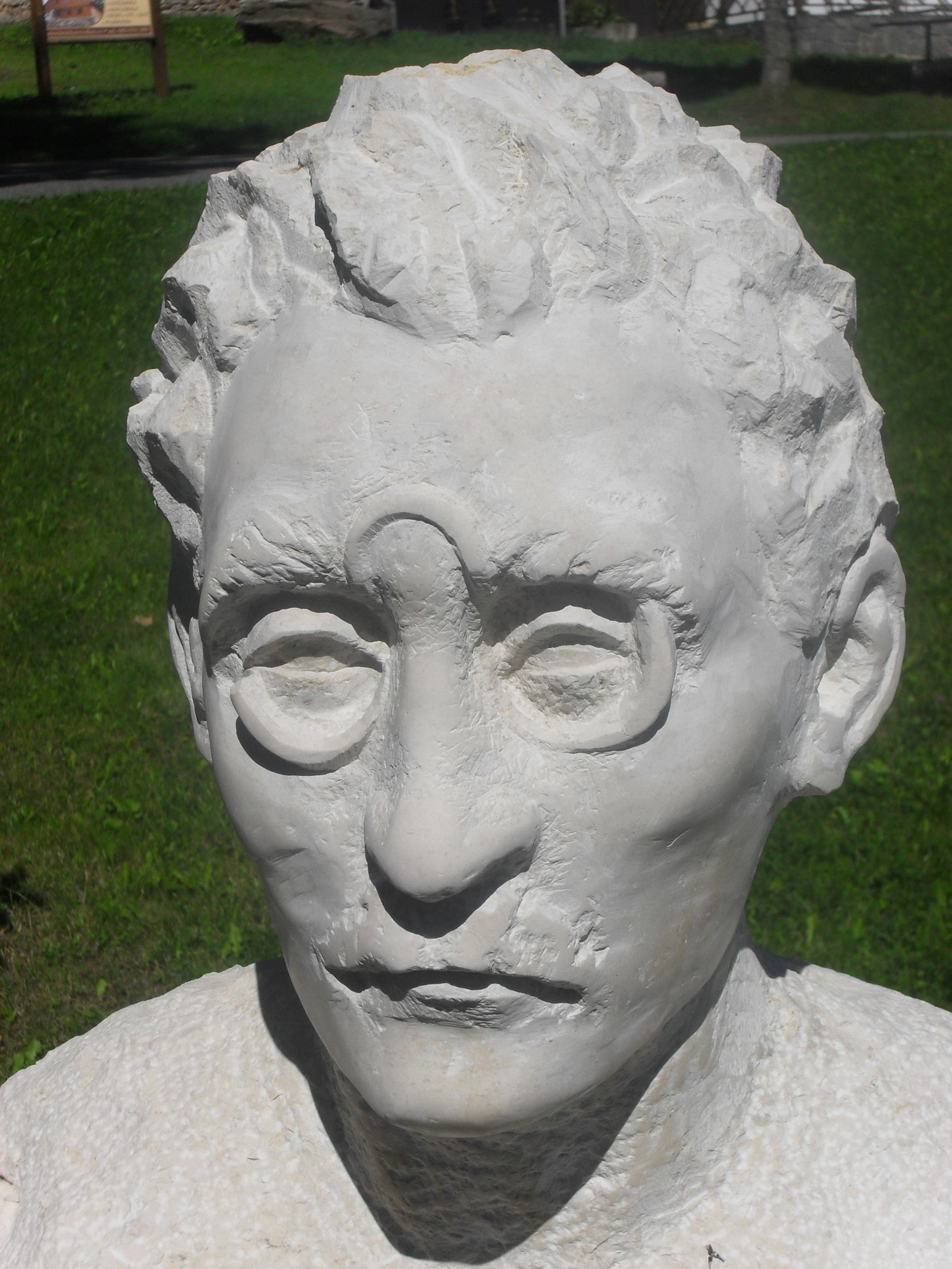
Bust of Josef Váchal in Prášily

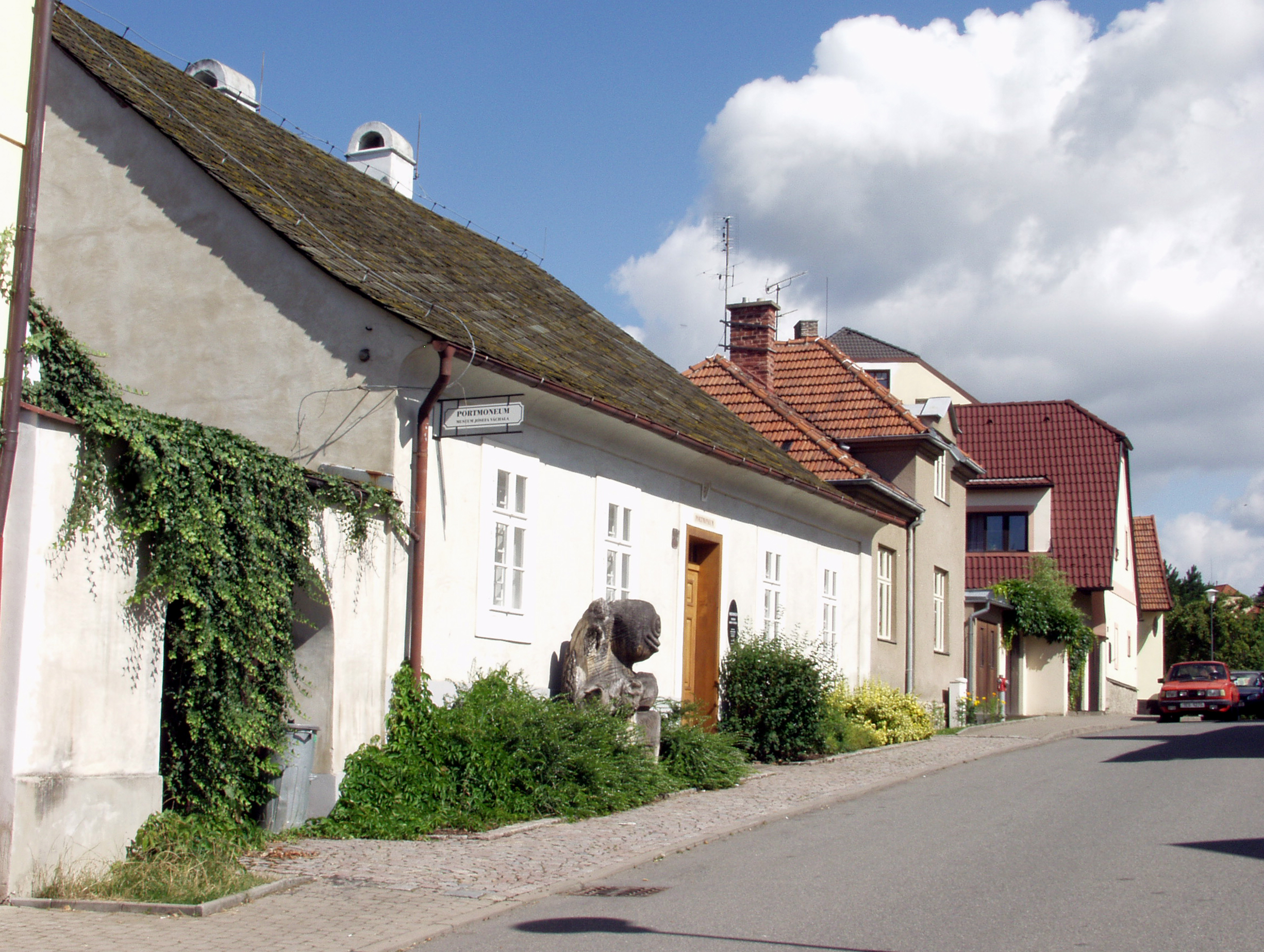
Portmoneum – Váchal's museum in Litomyšl

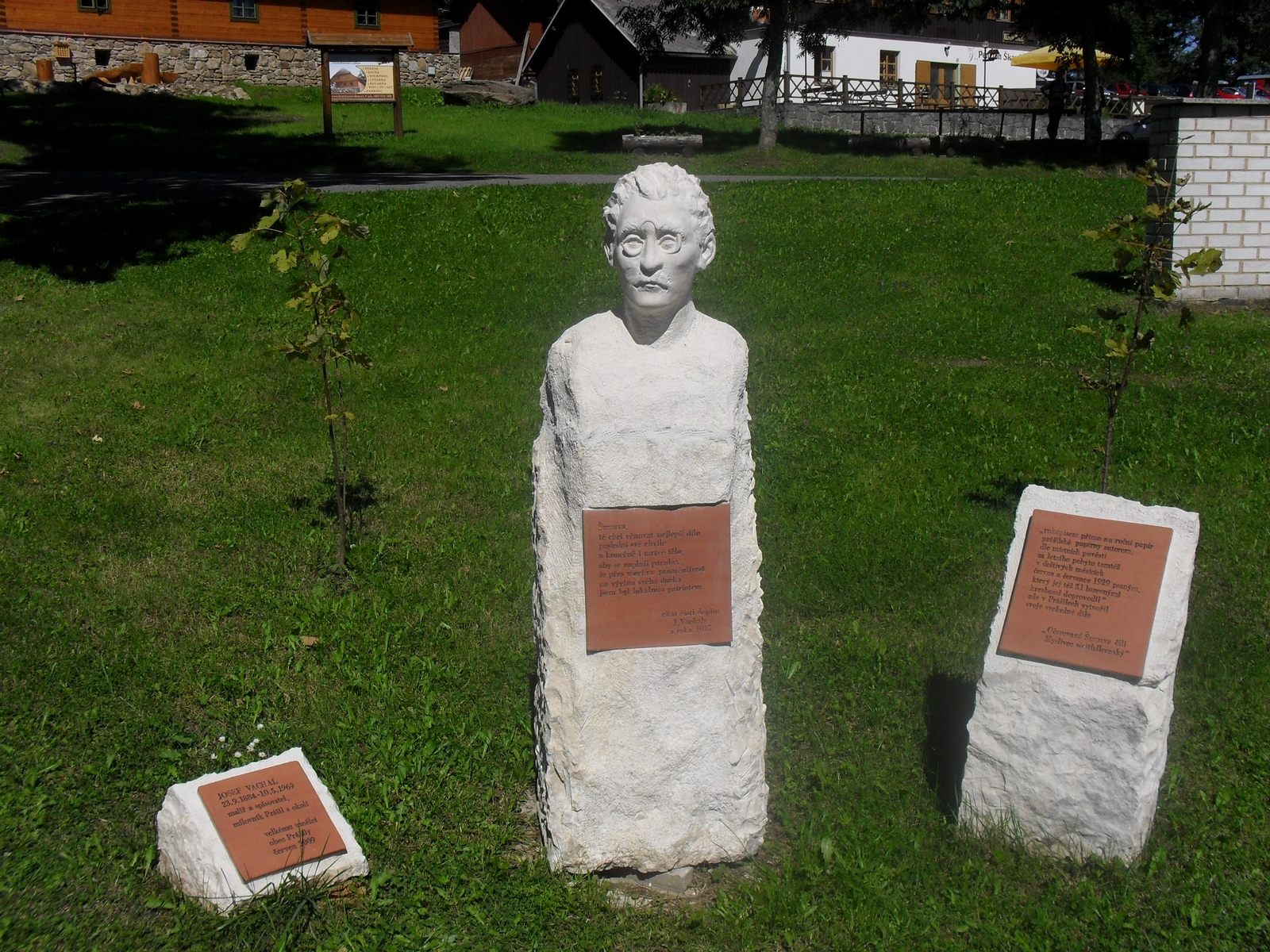
Memorial of Josef Váchal in Prášily

Váchal was the son of Josef Aleš-Lyžec and Anna Váchalová - his parents never married. He was brought up by his grandparents, Jan Aleš and Jana Alešová, in the southern Bohemian town of Písek, where he entered grammar school but left it prematurely. In 1898 Váchal moved to Prague, where he studied bookbinding and befriended his father's cousin, the painter Mikoláš Aleš. He was influenced by Art Nouveau during that time.

In 1900 he wrote his first poems, by 1903 he joined the Prague Theosophy Society, in 1904 he entered the Painter School and later became a respected painter and graphic designer. In 1910 Váchal published his first two books. Between January 1912 and January 1913 he enjoyed a short but intense friendship with the mystical Catholic writer Jakub Deml. In March 1913, Váchal married Máša Pešulová, and began a friendship with the collector J. Portman; Portman's house Portmoneum is now the Váchal Museum in Litomyšl.

From 1916 to 1918 Váchal served as a soldier on the Italian front. During 1940, expressing resistance against Nazi occupation of Czechoslovakia, he moved from Prague to the village of Studeňany, a part of Radim in eastern Bohemia. After the communist revolution of 1948 in Czechoslovakia, he became more socially and culturally isolated and his works were rarely seen in public. He lived in obscurity on the family estate of his partner, the artist cz:Anna Macková, in Studeňany. Even with the coming of Prague Spring in the late 1960s his situation didn't significantly change. He was, however, awarded the state title of Meritorious Artist shortly before his death in 1969. He is buried in Radim.

The publishing house Paseka was inspired by the character publisher Paseka in Váchal's Bloody Novel. Portmoneum, Váchal's museum in Litomyšl, was founded by Paseka publishing house in the early 1990s.

== Major works ==
- Krvavý román [lit. "Bloody Novel"] published 1924
- Mor v Korcule [Plague in Korcula] (published 1927)
- Malíř na frontě. Soca a Italie 1917-1918 [Painter in War. Soca and Italy 1917-1918] (published 1929)
- Šumava umírající a romantická [Gabreta dying and romantical] (published 1931, 11 copies)
- Receptář barevného dřevorytu [Book of colored woodcut] (published 1934) - theoretical work on woodcut techniques
- Nejnovejší legatio mortuorum [Newest legatio mortuorum] (published 1936)
- Kázání ad calendas graecas [Sermon ad calendas graecas] (published 1939, 17 copies)
- Ďáblova odstředivka [Devil's Spin Drier] (published 1941, 10 copies)
- Čertova babička [Imp's Grandma] (written 1940-1948)
- Moudrost Svobodného zednářství [Wisdom of Free-Masonry] (written 1951)
- Robinson mohelnský [Robinson of Mohelno] (written 1955)
- Živant a umrlanti [Living Man (=Váchal) and Zombies (=communists) of this world] (written 1956)
- Čarodejnice z Holešovic neboli Vězeň v bolševickém hradě [Witch of Holesovice or Prisoner in Bolsheviks's Castle] (written 1959)
- Paměti [Memoirs] published 1994
- Deníky 1922-1964 [Diaries] published 1998.
