= Ales Savitsky =

Belarusian writer

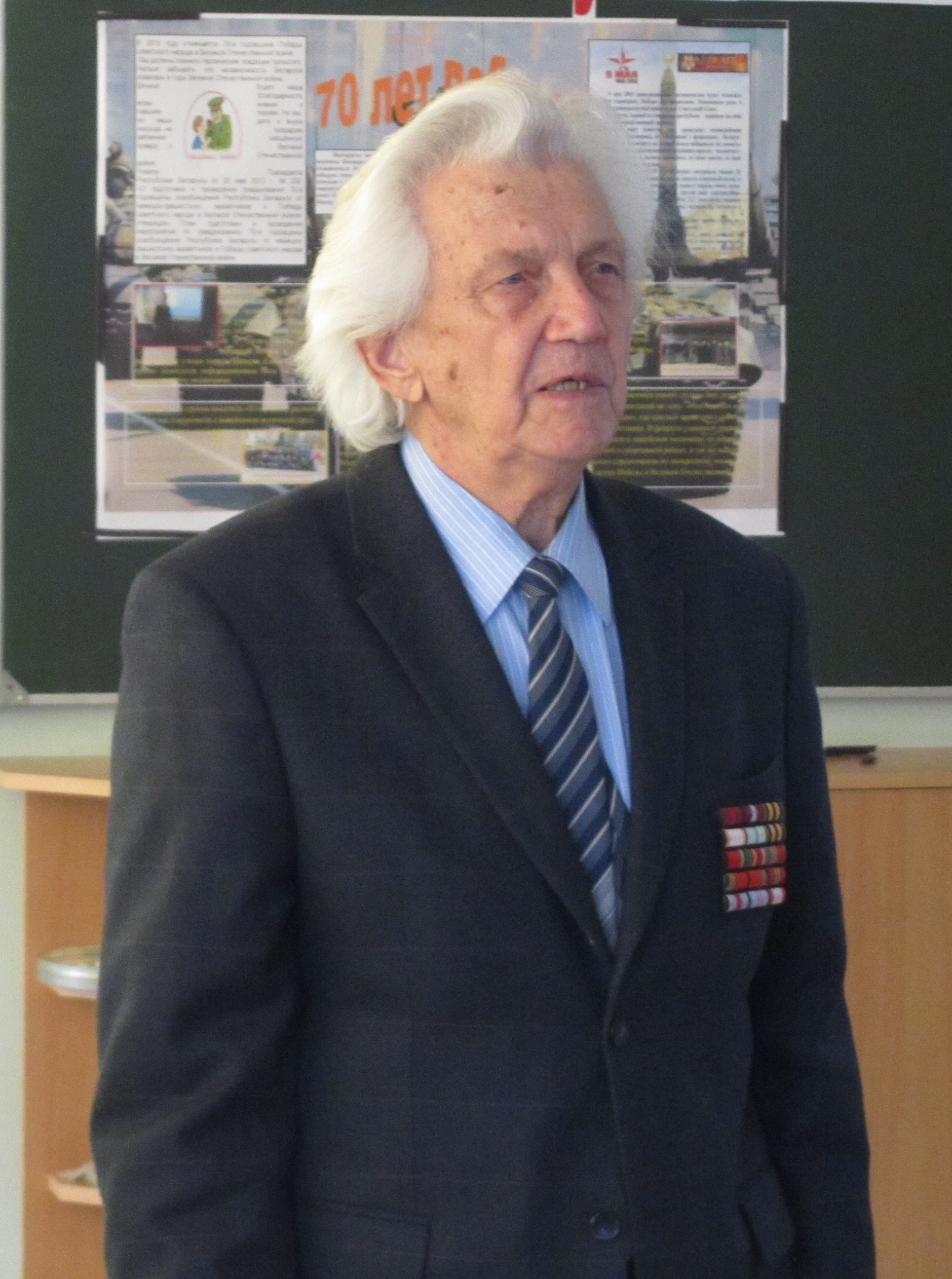
- Savitsky in 2015
- Born: Alexander Onufrievich Savitsky; 8 January 1924; Polotsk, Belarusian SSR, Soviet Union
- Died: 5 October 2015 (aged 91); Polotsk, Belarusian SSR, Soviet Union

Alexander Onufrievich Savitsky, also known as Ales Savitsky, (8 January 1924 – 5 October 2015) was a Belarusian writer and public figure. He was a member of the Writers' Union and the Union of Writers of the BSSR from 1961 to 2015.

== Life ==
Savitsky was born on 8 January 1924 in Polotsk, Belarusian SSR, as the son of a personnel officer of the Red Army. During World War II, he was a member of the guerrilla group "Death to fascism," and in 1943 was the commander of the detachment of subversive groups called the "Bolshevik" Voroshilov Brigade. They operated in the Vitebsk region. In a period 1944 from 1945, while being in the Soviet Army, he participated in the liberation of Lithuania, Poland, and in the battle for the capture of Berlin. He was wounded three times. After demobilization, he worked in the editorial office of the newspaper Polotsk "Bolshevik banner" (later "The Banner of Communism"). In 1958, he graduated from the Maxim Gorky Literature Institute in Moscow, in 1961, and continued postgraduate study at this institute. From 1961 to 1962, he was the head of the editorial staff of the publishing house "Harvest," and in the years from 1962 to 1969 he was the Scientific Secretary of the Literary Museum of Yakub Kolas. Also, from 1969 to 1973, he headed the sector of literary culture department of the Central Committee of the PBC. He died on 5 October 2015 in Polotsk.
