= Aleš Kunaver =

Slovenian alpinist and tour guide

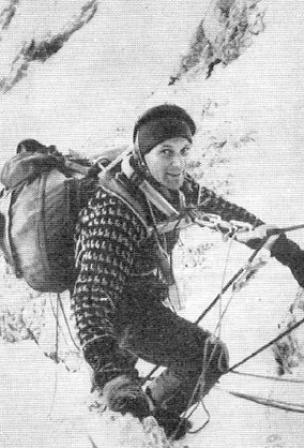
- Born: 23 June 1935; Ljubljana, Slovenija
- Died: 2 November 1984 (aged 49); Blejska Dobrava, Slovenija
- Spouse: Dušica Zlobec
- Children: Vlasta, Brigita, Primož

Aleš Kunaver (June 23, 1935 - November 2, 1984) was a Slovenian alpinist and tour guide.

Kunaver was the longtime head of the Commission for Expeditions to Foreign Mountaineers of the Alpine Association of Slovenia, member of the mountaineering society of Yugoslavia, representative of Yugoslavia to the International Climbing and Mountaineering Federation (UIAA), and a candidate for President of the Alpines Commission.

Kunaver was the first Yugoslav Himalaya film cameraman. He was also the head of six Yugoslav Himalayan expeditions, the driving force behind the Martins Mountaineering School.

Kunaver was credited with the rise of Slovenian mountaineering to the world summit.

== Life ==
Aleš Kunaver was born in Ljubljana to Henrietta and Pavel Kunaver. After graduating from high school, Kunaver enrolled at the Faculty of Mechanical Engineering of the University of Ljubljana. He started mountaineering at age 14, and as a student, he constructed climbing equipment and tools for the mountain rescue service. With his wife Dušica, née Zlobec, he had three children: Vlasta, Brigita, and Primož. He built a prefabricated house for the family with his own hands. For family holidays, he designed and made a plastic boat called "Kuna". The construction of this boat was so good that Jure Šterk crossed the Atlantic in one of the "Kunas". Aleš's only job was in Avtomontaža, a bus body factory, where he first worked as a constructor but soon became the commercial director of this factory. He traveled officially in Europe and much of Africa, as their buses have been established in many countries. Kunaver also wanted to introduce the production of aircraft in Avtomontaža, for which he drew some new types, but these plans, as well as many others, were interrupted by his death in a helicopter accident in the forest above Blejska Dobrava on 2 November 1984.

== Kunaver as alpinist ==
Between 1950 and 1960, Kunaver and his fellow climbers undertook the first winter crossing of the Kamnik Alps; the first winter ascent of the long German route, the Long German Triglav north wall; the first Slovene repetition of Bonatti's route in Grand Capucin; the first Slovene repetition of the classical route in Drus and many others. He made several first ascents in the Slovenian Alps, among them:

- 1961, he climbed with Kazimirjem Drašlarjem the first route in the famous Triglav Sphinx (VI/A2), which at the time was considered the last riddle of the Triglav north wall.
- 1968 Aleš Kunaver, together with Stane Belak-Šrauf and Anton Sazonov-Tonač, successfully finished the first ascent of Čop's Pillar in the Triglav north wall. It involved eight days in the most difficult winter conditions, with very poor equipment; they count to this day among the hardest endeavors in the Slovenian mountains. Seventy rescuers from all over Slovenia had come together on the dangerous, avalanche-prone slopes of Triglav, with two meters of snow and more relentlessly coming down. The three climbers succeeded in climbing out of the wall by themselves and met the rescuers when descending from Triglav.

=== Expeditions ===
He was a member of the first expedition and later the leader and organizer of the following expeditions:

- 1960: a member of JAHO I, first ascents on Trisul 3 (6170 m) and Trisul 2 (6690 m)
- 1962: He and Zoran Jerin made a reconnaissance trip for the next expeditions through western Nepal, from Kathmandu to Darjeeling.
- 1968: Head of the Hindu Kush expedition to Afghanistan; they reached five peaks ranging from 5900 to 6900m.
- 1969: leader of the expedition JAHO III to Anapurna, climbed Anapurna 4 (7525 m); on this expedition, Dr. Andlovic set a unique world record - he saved Kazimir Drašlar's frostbitten fingers at an altitude of 6500 m, in the highest "office" in the world at the time.
- 1972: The leader of JAHO IV ascended Makalu; they reached an altitude of about 8000 m, not by the usual approach but for the first time via the southern wall. The expedition is worth mentioning also for the scientific research done by three scientists who joined the team.
- 1975: leader of JAHO VI to Makalu, via a new route in the southern wall, with one member reaching the summit without using oxygen.
- 1981: leader of the expedition to the southern wall of Lhotse: they reached the top of the wall at 8000 m (Franček Knez, Vanja Matijevec); the International Mountaineering Association (UIAA) assessed it as the "most difficult ascent in the Himalayas so far".
- 1984: leader of the Croatian-Slovenian expedition to Manaslu '84; two members reached the top of the mountain in an alpine style

=== Routes named after him ===
Friends called Kunaver "bara sab", which in the language of the Nepalese locals means "leader". During the six expeditions, he always brought all their members home safely. He gives his name to the following routes in the Slovenian mountains and the Himalayas:

- Kunaver's route in Mali Mangart, 1986 (Filip Bence, Peter Podgornik)
- Kunaver's route on the western wall of Trisul, 1987 (Slavko Frantar, Janez Kastelec, Vlasta Kunaver (Aleš' daughter), Sandi Marinčič, Lado Vidmar)
- Slovenian route on the southern wall of Lhotse, dedicated to Kunaver, 1990 (Tomo Česen)

== Acknowledgments ==
- Student Prešeren Award for the construction of a rescue drum for the mountain rescue service, February 8, 1960.
- The Order of Merit for the Nation with a Golden Star was awarded for the Makalu Expedition in 1975.
- Golden badges of the Mountaineering Association of Yugoslavia:
  - as a member of the 1st Himalayan Expedition
  - for many years of meritorious work in mountaineering, April 27, 1981
  - for the 3rd Yugoslav Himalayan Expedition
  - for the 4th Himalayan Expedition
- Golden badges and the golden badge of honor of the Mountaineering Association of Slovenia
- Bloudek Award in 1974 for top achievements in mountaineering and alpinism as the most successful participant in Yugoslav expeditions to foreign mountains and leader of six expeditions, as a member of GRS, and as the author of films on mountaineering.
- Golden medal at the international competition of skiers - mountain rescuers in Davos, Switzerland (as a team with Marjan Keršič-Belač), 1958
- Diploma for the film "Ascent to Trisul" at the IX. Yugoslav Documentary Film Festival in Belgrade, 1962
- Medal for the same film at the XIV. Trent International Mountaineering Film Festival in 1963

== Manang Mountaineering School ==
In 1978, Kunaver proposed to the government of Yugoslavia to help establish a mountain guide school in Manang. The project was approved, and with the assistance of the Consulate General of Nepal in Slovenia, Mr. Aswin Kumar Shrestha played a vital role in acting as the bridge between the Nepal Mountaineering Association (NMA) and the Alpine Association of Slovenia.

The Nepal Mountaineering Association fully supported the project by providing land and necessary legal guidance. In a dilemma of either leading an expedition to Everest or building a mountaineering school, Kunaver subordinated his mountaineering goals to a desire to help Nepalese locals. With mountaineering knowledge, he wanted to prevent accidents for locals in the Himalayas. He also wanted the locals to become mountain guides, not just ignorant bearer mules. "Everest is the goal and school is the mission," he said when deciding to focus on the Mountaineering School at Manang, with the full support of the Alpine Association of Slovenia. He was very keen to set up and support the training school.

In 1979, in Sabji Khola, Humde, the Manang Mountaineering School was established with the financial support of Yugoslavia, the government of Slovenia, and the great effort and unselfish help of Mr. Ales Kunaver.

== Bibliography ==
- Aleš Kunaver &al: Makalu, Mladinska knjiga 1974, COBISS 635422
- Aleš Kunaver &c: onto the top of the world, Mladinska knjiga, 1979 COBISS 269102
- Aleš Kunaver with himalayan friends: Trisul - Varuh boginje (knjiga in DVD), published by author Dušica Kunaver, 2006
- Aleš Kunaver with himalayan friends: MAKALU, published by author Dušica Kunaver, 2006
- Aleš Kunaver, the land of sherpas 1962, published by author Dušica Kunaver, 2007, ISBN 978-961-6179-66-9
- Aleš Kunaver with climbing friends: LHOTSE - south wall, published by author Dušica Kunaver, 2008

Documentary films:

- ČOP illar, 1968
- TRISUL, 1961
- Aleš Kunaver - The land of sherpas, 1962
- MAKALU, 1972 in 1975
- LHOTSE SOUTH WALL, 1981
