= Olé Olé (Olé Olé album) =

Studio album by Olé Olé
- Released: 1983
- Recorded: 1983
- Genre: Pop
- Label: CBS Records

Olé Olé chronology
Olé Olé (1983)	Voy a mil (1983)

Olé Olé is the debut 1983 album of Spanish pop group Olé Olé for CBS Records. The album established the success of the group with 100,000 sales.

== Track listing ==
1. "Necesito más" (Gustavo Montesano) – 3:35
2. "El mayor secreto" – (Gustavo Montesano) – 3:43
3. "No controles" (Nacho Cano) – 4:00
4. "Alguien" (Gustavo Montesano) – 3:42
5. "Todo mi amor no es para ti" (Luis Carlos Esteban) – 3:32
6. "Conspiración (Habanera de Carmen)" (Georges Bizet, Luis Gómez Escalar) – 3:23
7. "Adrenalina" (Luis Carlos Esteban) – 2:59
8. "Mirando la luna por la ventana" (Gustavo Montesano) – 3:52
9. "Dame" (Luis Gómez-Escolar, Gustavo Montesano) – 3:44
10. "Fantasmas" (LEsteban) – 4:20
