= Vicky Larraz =

- Born: Victoria López-Muñoz de Arce; 26 August 1962 (age 63); Madrid, Spain
- Genres: Pop
- Instrument: Voice
- Years active: 1983–2022

Victoria López-Muñoz de Arce (born 26 August 1962), known professionally as Vicky Larraz, is a Spanish singer-songwriter and television presenter. She represented Spain at the OTI Festival 1987 with her song "Bravo samurái" placing third.

== Albums and Singles ==
=== With Olé Olé ===
- 1983 - Olé Olé
- 1984 - Voy a mil
- 2013 - Por Ser Tú" (Single)
- 2016 - Duetos-"Sin Control" (Album)
- 2017 - En Control" (Album)
- 2017 - Dejame Sola, Supernatural" (Singles)
- 2017 - Victimas del Desamor" (Single)
- 2017 - Bravo Samurai" (Single)

=== With OLE'STAR ===
Vicky Larraz was founding member of OLE'STAR.

- 2018 - Hoy Quiero Confesar (Single)
- 2018 - Regala (Single)
- 2019 - Bravo Samurai (Single)
- 2019 - No Controles (Single)
- 2019 - Dress You Up (Single)
- 2019 - Imaginando (Single)
- 2019 - Lili Bailando Sola (Single)
- 2019 - Imaginando Mil Controles (Single)
- 2019 - Solo Promesas (Single)
- 2019 - Soldados del Amor- feat Layonel (Single)
- 2019 - Seré Luz (Single)
- 2020 - A Fuego Lento (Single)
- 2020 - Tal Vez Será - Feat Mago de Oz (Single)
- 2020 - Gracias por pensar en mí -Feat Antonio Pavón (Single)
- 2021 - Me Lo He Quedao (Single)
- 2022 - Que ha pasado entre tú y yo (Single)

=== Solo albums ===
- 1986 - Vicky Larraz
- 1987 - Siete noches sin ti
- 1989 - Huracán
- 2001 - Todas sus grabaciones en CBS
- 2010 - Contigo otra vez
- 2012 - Earthquake (Single)
- 2015 - Llevatelo Todo 7-CD Box Set
