= Alexej Ivanko =

Slovak lawyer and politician

Member of the National Council
- In office 15 October 2002 – 4 July 2006

Personal details
- Born: 12 February 1949 (age 77)
- Party: Slovak Democratic and Christian Union – Democratic Party; Free Forum

Alexej Ivanko (born 12 March 1949) is a Slovak lawyer and former politician, who served as a member of the National Council in 2002–2006. Ivanko was elected on the originally elected on the Slovak Democratic and Christian Union – Democratic Party list, but left the party caucus in 2005 to join the Free Forum party.

After retiring from politics in 2006, he has been active as an attorney and businessman. In 2022 the Slovak police accused Ivanko of being a part of a criminal network influencing court decisions in Eastern Slovakia. Ivanko refused the allegation. In December 2023 he was found guilty and give and sentenced to a 2-year probation.
