= Aleš Hlad =

Slovenian supermoto racer

Aleš Hlad is a Slovenian supermoto racer who lives near Ljubljana, Slovenia. He raced the KTM motorcycle in the 2007 season for the Bulgarian Motorcycle Federation. He was the 2005 European Champion and won the Athens GP in 2007.

== See also ==
- List of fastest production motorcycles
- Motorcycle racing
