= Aleś Harun =

Belarusian poet and prose writer

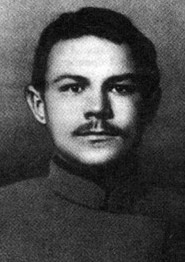
Ales Harun

Aljaksandr Uladzimiravič Prušynski (Belarusian: Аляксандр Уладзіміравіч Прушынскі; 11 March 1887 in Minsk – 28 July 1920 in Kraków), better known as Aleś Harun (Belarusian: Алесь Гарун), was a Belarusian poet, prose writer, dramatist, lyricist and an opinion journalist.

== Biography ==
He was born on February 27 (March 11) 1887 in Minsk. His father, Uladzimir Prušynski, a manual labourer and mother, Sophia (née. Zhivitsa), were members of the Catholic community in Minsk. At five years old he could read in Russian and Polish. Later he graduated from the Minsk third city parish school (1897) and a trade school (1902).

He worked as a joiner in the carpentry and furniture factory in Minsk. From 1904 he joined the Belarusian Party of Socialist Revolutionaries. In 1907 he began to publish in the newspaper "Nasha Niva".

On March 4, 1907, he was arrested for anti-government activities at the underground press on Broad Street in Minsk, where was printed at the time an appeal "to all workers". In July 1908 the Vilnius Court of Justice condemned him to lifelong exile in Siberia. He was exiled to Irkutsk Province. From 1914 he received the right to travel throughout Siberia. While working on a barge on the Lena River, he prepared a collection of his poems, Matshyn Dar (A Mother's Gift), and sent it to Vilnius where it was later published in 1918. In 1917 he returned to Minsk and participated in the first All-Belarusian Congress and Belarusian National Committee but he became disillusioned and as a member of the Belarusian Military Commission he collaborated with the Polish army of Jozef Pilsudski in hopes of Belarusian independence.
