= Alexej Pludek =

Czech writer (1923–2002)

Alexej Pludek (29 January 1923, Prostějov – 7 September 2002, Prague) was a Czech writer. In 1950 his play "Případ Modrá Voda" (The Blue Water case) was shown on stage of "stage D50".

== Bibliography ==
- Slunce v údolí (Sun in the Valley)-a "builder" novel, about the building of railway tracks in Slovakia.
- Dvě okna do dvora (Two windows into the courtyard) (1959)
- Ženy nemají pravdu (Women are not right (in sense of saying something that is false)) (1961)
- Ptačí pírko (A bird's feather) (1959) a book for children
- Tudy chodíval Ječmínek (Through here, Ječmínek walked) (1959)
- Horami jde březen (The March goes through the mountains) (1963)
- Pověsti dávných časů (The myths of old times) (1971)
- Český král Karel (Czech King Karel) (1978)
- Kralevic, král, císař (Prince, King, Emperor) (1983)
- Vabank (1974)
- Faraónův píšař (Pharao's amanuensis) (1966)
- Rádce velkých rádžů (The advisor of the Great Rajah's) (1975)
- Nepřítel z Atlantidy (Enemy from Atlantis) (1981)
- Hledání antipoda (In search of the antipode) (1986)
- Česká pře (Czech Litigation) (1989)
