= Boseň =

- Municipality
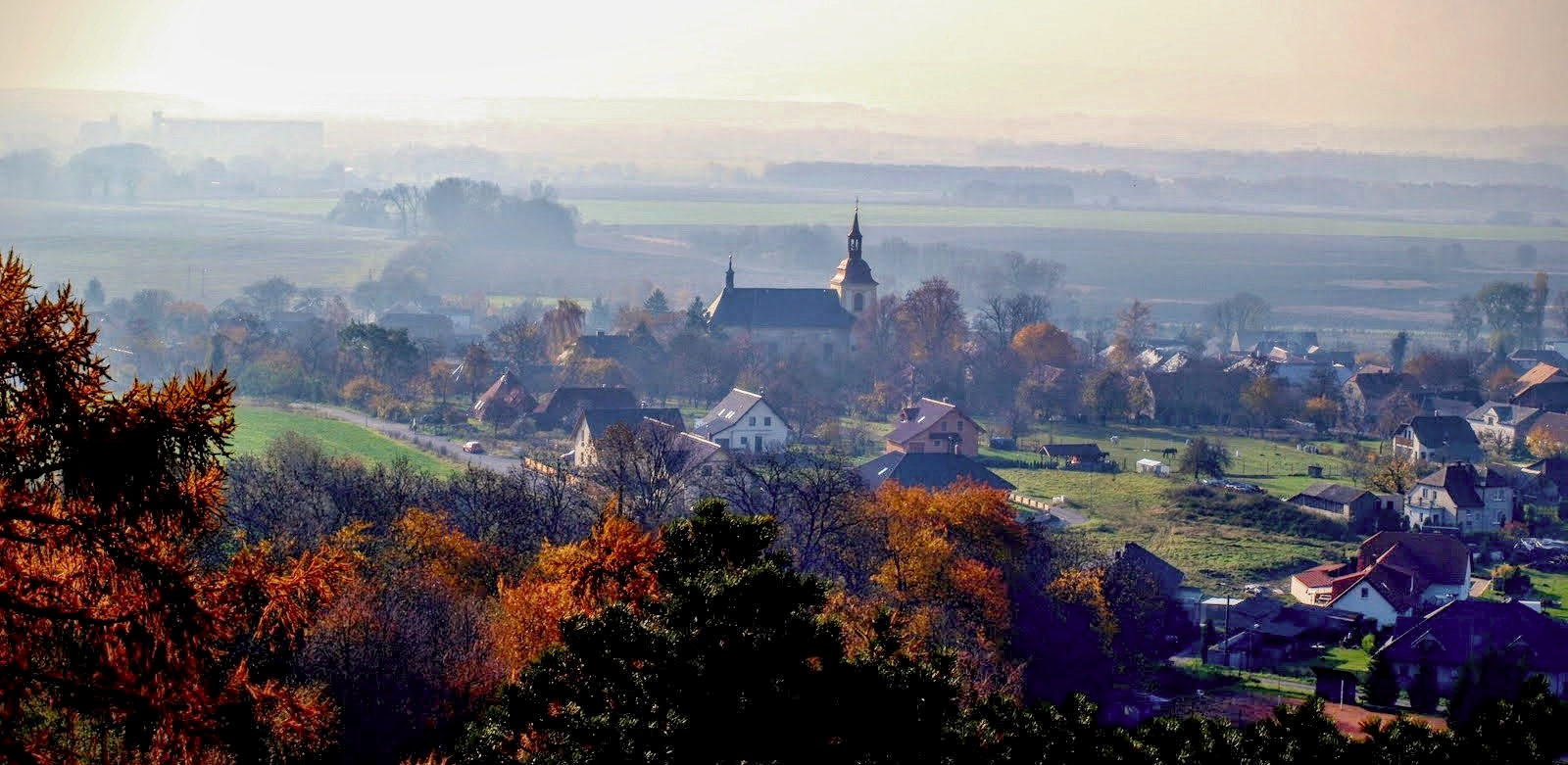
- View from Valečov Castle

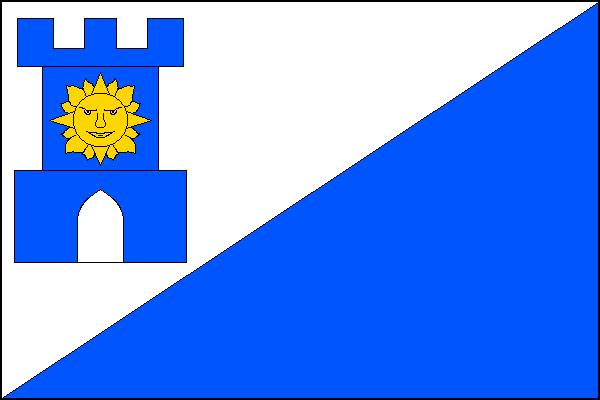
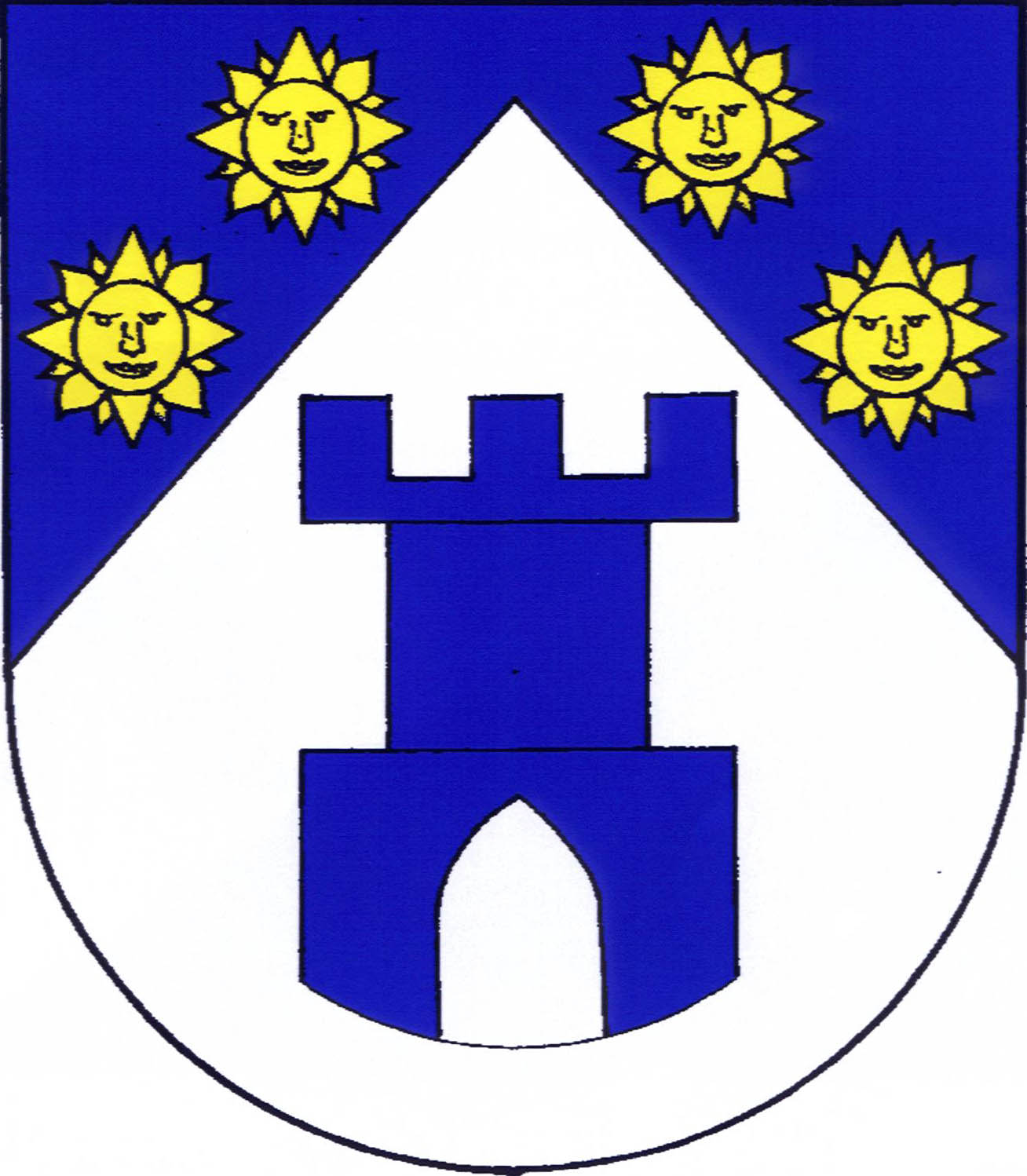
- Flag Coat of arms

- Location in the Czech Republic
- Coordinates: 50°30′15″N 15°1′22″E
- Country: Czech Republic
- Region: Central Bohemian
- District: Mladá Boleslav
- First mentioned: 1057

Area
  - Total: 9.93 km^{2} (3.83 sq mi)
- Elevation: 277 m (909 ft)

Population (2026-01-01)
  - Total: 540
  - Density: 54/km^{2} (140/sq mi)
- Time zone: UTC+1 (CET)
  - Summer (DST): UTC+2 (CEST)
- Postal code: 295 01
- Website: bosen-obec.cz

Boseň is a municipality and village in Mladá Boleslav District in the Central Bohemian Region of the Czech Republic. It has about 500 inhabitants.

== Administrative division ==
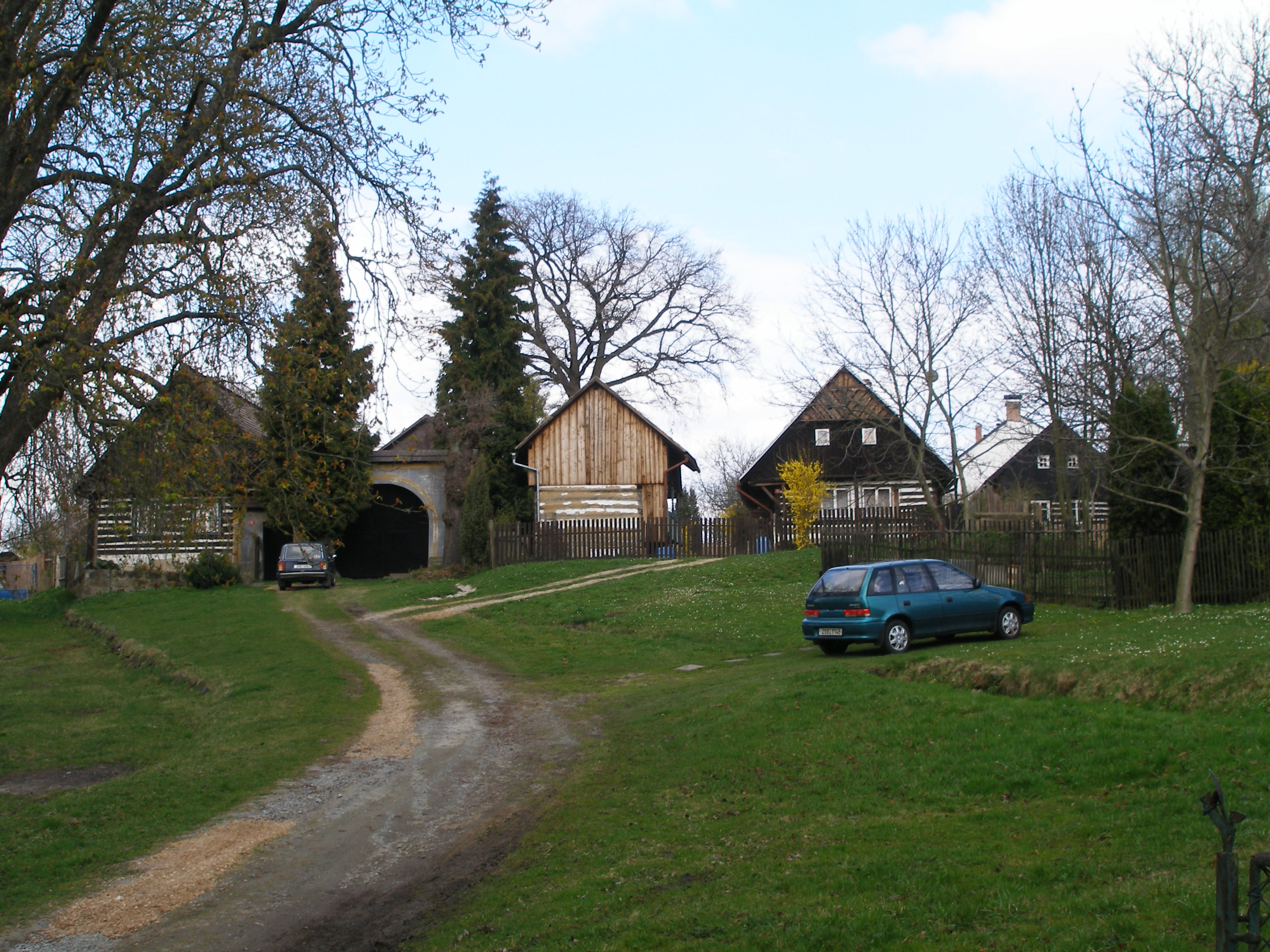
The village of Mužský

Boseň consists of four municipal parts (in brackets population according to the 2021 census):

- Boseň (382)
- Mužský (39)
- Zápudov (12)
- Zásadka (92)

== Etymology ==
The name is derived from the personal name Bosen, meaning "Bosen's (court)".

== Geography ==
Boseň is located about 12 kilometres (7 mi) northeast of Mladá Boleslav and 27 km (17 mi) south of Liberec. It lies in the Jičín Uplands. The highest point is the hill Mužský, which is the highest peak of the entire Mladá Boleslav District with an elevation of 463 m (1,519 ft). Most of the municipal territory lies within the Bohemian Paradise Protected Landscape Area.

== History ==
The first written mention of Boseň is from 1057, when the village was donated to the newly established Litoměřice Chapter. History of the village is connected with the Valečov Castle, which was first mentioned in a document from 1316–1318. The castle was burned down in 1434, but it was reconstructed by Vaněk of Valečov. The castle was then damaged in the Thirty Years' War and in 1652, it was described as a ruin. For two centuries until 1892, the rock spaces of the ruins became the home of the poor.

== Demographics ==
Historical population

| Year | Pop. | ±% |
|---|---|---|
| 1869 | 950 | — |
| 1880 | 962 | +1.3% |
| 1890 | 967 | +0.5% |
| 1900 | 864 | −10.7% |
| 1910 | 828 | −4.2% |

| Year | Pop. | ±% |
|---|---|---|
| 1921 | 853 | +3.0% |
| 1930 | 798 | −6.4% |
| 1950 | 612 | −23.3% |
| 1961 | 595 | −2.8% |
| 1970 | 526 | −11.6% |

| Year | Pop. | ±% |
|---|---|---|
| 1980 | 443 | −15.8% |
| 1991 | 358 | −19.2% |
| 2001 | 368 | +2.8% |
| 2011 | 445 | +20.9% |
| 2021 | 525 | +18.0% |

Source: Censuses

== Transport ==
There are no railways or major roads passing through the municipality.

== Sights ==
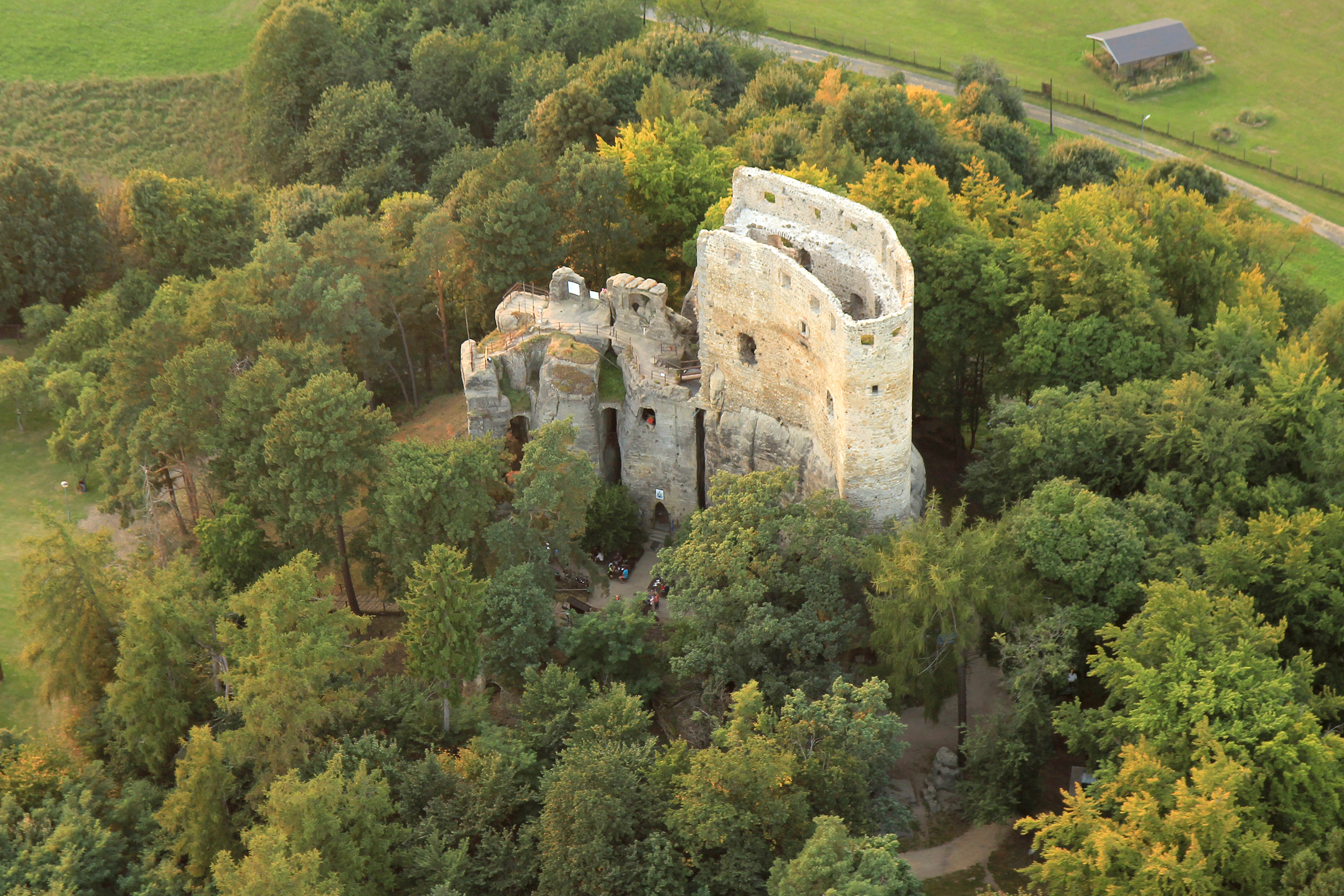
Valečov Castle

Boseň is known for the Valečov Castle. The ruin was first repaired in 1914. Since 1994, it is owned by the municipality of Boseň, which made further reconstructions and opened the castle to the public.

The landmark of the centre of Boseň is the Church of Saint Wenceslaus. The Baroque church was built in 1729 and replaced the original Gothic church from the 14th century.

The village of Mužský is well preserved and is protected as a village monument reservation. It is formed by a set of folk architecture ground-floor wooden houses from the 18th and 19th centuries.

A monument to the victims of the Austro-Prussian War in 1866 is located on the top of Mužský hill.
