= Ales Bachyla =

Belarusian poet and playwright

- Алесь Бачыла
- Born: 2 March 1918; Leshnitsa, Igumensky Uyezd, Minsk Governorate, RSFSR
- Died: 3 January 1983 (aged 64)
- Resting place: Eastern Cemetery, Minsk, Belarus
- Education: BSPU
- Occupations: Playwright, translator, poet
- Writing career
- Language: Belarusian
- Period: 1934–1983

Ales Bachyla (Belarusian: Алесь Бачыла) (1918–1983) was a Belarusian poet and playwright. His verses were generally "memories of the front, daily work of common people, love towards his country and the duty of a citizen, patriotism and portraying nature."
