= Olé Olé (band) =

Spanish band of the 1980s

- Origin: Spain
- Years active: 1980s
- Past members: Vicky Larraz; Marta Sánchez; Sonia Santana

Olé Olé was a popular Spanish band of the 1980s. The group went through three phases of popularity broadly coinciding with three female vocalists. The group began with singer Vicky Larraz (1982–1985). After Larraz went solo came Marta Sánchez (1986–1991) in years that saw increasing success in Latin America. After Sánchez also went solo came the third singer es:Sonia Santana (1992–1993).

== The beginnings of the group: Vicky Larraz 1982–1985 ==
The story of Olé Olé began in 1982, when the CBS label decided to create a new techno-pop group in the Mecano line. The one in charge of choosing the members was Argentine producer Jorge Álvarez, who also produced the first Mecano records. This is how Luis Carlos Esteban met, who came from the group Trastos, Emilio Estecha, from the group Plástico and Juan Tarodo († 2013). As a singer they chose Vicky Larraz. The Argentine Gustavo Montesano joined shortly after. In his country he had been part of the rock group Crucis. The release of "Olé Olé" was with "No Controles", the song that Nacho Cano gave to the group. "No Controles" was published in February 1983 and became an immediate success and launched the group to popularity. This song was also a success in Italy.

The second single was a song that followed the same techno-pop line, "Dame". Gustavo Montesano joined the recording and promotion of the same.

After these two advance singles, an album was published with the same name, "Olé Olé", produced, like all the following ones, by Jorge Álvarez and with arrangements by Luis Cobos. The songs were composed by Luis Carlos Esteban and Gustavo Montesano.

Their next success was the group's version of the song "L'amour est un oiseau rebelle", from the opera "Carmen" by Bizet, "Conspiración". An English version, "Conspiracy", was also recorded on this topic, which was published in Europe, which allowed them to make a promotional tour through different countries of the continent. "Conspiración" was their first Top 40 number 1 in Spain. The fourth and last single from this album was "Adrenalina". They made an extensive tour around the country, making known this work, which was a success and increased its sales.

"Voy a Mil", the band's second album, appeared in 1984 and was presented with the single of the same title. It became a new success and in it Vicky Larraz demonstrates again her vocal power and great energy in each of her performances. The second single was the "Caminemos" version. Only two singles of this work were extracted. Techno-pop songs like "Un Golpe de Suerte", "Pasos de Mujer" or "Desaparecidos", among others, were not released. The album was a success, although to a lesser extent than the first.

After finalizing that year's tour, Vicky Larraz and Luis Carlos Esteban decided to leave the group. Vicky, a restless artist with great creativity, felt very limited her artistic potential within the group, where she could not compose. In this way she started a solo career. Luis Carlos Esteban became one of the most renowned producers and composers in Spain.

== Success in Latin America: Marta Sánchez 1985–1991 ==
The success had accompanied the group from its beginnings, but at that moment they underwent a test of fire: they had to show that they could survive the abandonment of a charismatic singer, Vicky Larraz, and one of its main composers, Luis Carlos Esteban. But again fortune was on their side and they had the support of a new record house, Hispavox. Their new voice, Marta Sánchez, came from the Cristal Oskuro group.

At the end of 1985 they presented the new singer with the release of the single and maxi "Lili Marlene" (version of the German song "Lili Marleen"), which began playing on all radio and television stations, highlighting the symbolic relief Vicky Larraz gave Marta Sánchez when the group went to the TVE program "Tocata", of which Vicky was a presenter at that time. The success led to the launch of their third album in 1986, under the title of "Bailando Sin Salir de Casa".

This was also the name of the second single extracted from the album, a track composed by Marcelo Montesano, Gustavo's brother, who would take the place of Luis Carlos Esteban as the group's keyboardist and composer.

The third single was a ballad composed by Gustavo Montesano, "Déjame Sola", one of the most appreciated songs on the album. The fourth and last single was another composition by Marcelo, "Yo no me subo al coche de cualquiera"

The album became a golden record (more than 50,000 copies sold). Marta Sánchez was beginning to be a well-known singer and the group had succeeded with her new formation.

Marta suddenly decided to dye herself of platinum blonde. This concerned the company and its partners, but it served as a new approach to the image and title of the band's fourth album, "Los Hombres Las Prefieren Rubias." In the spring of 1987, " Sola (Con un Desconocido) " was released, which became Olé Olé's new number 1 and placed the album in the top 20 of the best selling albums in Spain. They surpassed the Platinum record (more than 150,000 copies sold). The second single was "Yo Soy Infiel", a song full of energy that Marta interprets showing that she was a complete artist whose voice improved over time.

At this point, the band had already abandoned its early electronic sound and had shifted towards a much simpler pop.

At the beginning of 1988 the last single of the album was released, "Secretos", a dance song that became an instant success. It reached the number 1 of Spain's Top 40 in its second week.

But in addition to the songs extracted as singles, other songs on the album were also played on radio and television, such as the Italian version of the song "La Bámbola", which achieved notable success, as well as "Ansiedad" and "Poema en el avión".

The new album, "Cuatro Hombres para Eva", became another success and again beat the platinum record. Most of the songs were tailored to Marta's new sexy image. The clearest example was the new single "Supernatural", which became number 1 throughout the summer of 1988. In these months Olé Olé was the group that performed the most concerts throughout the country. At that time, the conquest of Latin America also began, where the group began to acquire a remarkable popularity.

The other singles that gave life to the album would be "Vecina", "Solo Es un viaje" and "Búscala", followed by the bolero "Quizás, Quizás, Quizás". Olé Olé and Marta Sánchez were the most popular group of the moment along with Mecano.

After finishing the tour of this album, Emilio Estecha decided to leave the group to devote himself to computer science.

Its sixth album took the concise title "1990". They went to the United States to record under the instructions of Jorge Álvarez, their regular producer and Nile Rodgers, a reputed American producer who had been part of Chic and had produced for singers like Madonna. Nile Rodgers composed and produced two songs for "Olé Olé", "Te Lo Daré Todo" and "Soldados del Amor." The latter became the first single of the new disc and one of the successes of the summer of 1990, also placing the album in the top 5 of the list of sales in Spain. "1990" was Olé Olé's best-selling album, surpassing double platinum (more than 200,000 copies) .

The presentation of the record on television was carried out in Concha Velasco's program "Viva el Espectáculo", where Marta performed the first three singles of the album, "Soldados del amor", "Con Solo una Mirada" and, before an emotional and grateful presenter, «La Chica Ye-Ye», a song that Concha popularized in the 60s. The fourth single, released at the beginning of 1991, was "Te Lo Daré Todo". They toured in the summers of 1990 and 1991, both in Spain and Latin America. In addition, an English version of "1990" was recorded, with five songs in that language, although it was not promoted. Also at the end of 1990 Olé Olé was chosen to travel to the Persian Gulf and to perform before the Spanish troops participating in the Gulf War. Marta performed various songs and encouraged the soldiers, as Marilyn Monroe did in the Korean War in 1954 or Rosa Morena in the Green March in 1975. The concert was broadcast on TVE (Televisión Española) at Christmas that year.

At the end of 1991 Marta Sánchez decided to launch her solo career.

Again, and after 6 successful albums, Olé Olé was left without a singer.

== Third singer: Sonia Santana 1992–1993 ==
The Olé Olé boys were very clear that they were a group and that if they had survived the abandonment of their first singer, they could overcome the departure of Marta Sánchez. So, they called a national contest in the magazine El Gran Musical to choose their third singer. However, neither Marcelo nor Gustavo agreed with the fact that the election was done like this and they proposed the singer Esther Álvarez, with whom they even recorded some tracks.

The lucky chosen one was Sonia Santana, a young Canarian singer. With her they recorded 1992's "Al Descubierto", which was their seventh and last album.

"Al Descubierto" was a record that was a step towards the maturity of the group without losing the essence of their music. The melodious and sweet voice of Sonia accompanied songs such as "No Mueras Posibilidad" or "Volaba Yo", which were the first two singles of the album.

As a third single, they released "Pero También Te Deseo", an elegant song in classic Olé Olé style. The fourth single, "Adiós", was barely promoted. It was a song composed by Marcelo Montesano about the phenomenon of immigration. The followers of Olé Olé remained unconditional and accepted Sonia as a future bet for the group.

The group obtained relative success, reached the Gold Record by selling 50,000 copies and completed a tour in Spain and America performing the work.

But this time there was no luck. Disconnects between Sonia and the boys led to the dismissal of the singer, leaving the group again without a voice.

This time there was no continuation and this was the end of a career that spanned more than ten years of Spanish pop. Olé Olé's former members have dedicated themselves since then to various solo projects, mostly the production and composition of songs for other artists.

== Olé Olé 2007, 2016: "Duetos sin control" and tour in 2017 ==
In 2007 Luis Carlos Esteban returned and the group released the album "Grandes Éxitos y otras Terapias de Grupo".

In November 2016 Olé Olé reformed again and released "Duetos sin Control", a record of great hits reviewed and performed by Vicky Larraz along with other artists such as Paloma San Basilio, Modestia Aparte, Falete, Daniel Diges and Rocko. It was published under the Rama Lama Music label and was produced by Alejandro de Pinedo. The group was led by Vicky Larraz along with Gustavo Montesano, Marcelo Montesano and Emilio Estecha. Also participating are Olé Olé's other two singers, Marta Sánchez and Sonia Santana. Marta Sánchez performed the song "Búscala" with Vicky Larraz and Sonia Santana sang "Yo soy infiel" with Vicky Larraz. In February 2017 they released "En Control", again their greatest hits, but this time performed only by Vicky Larraz. Only the duet "Búscala" was performed with Marta Sánchez. This return also meant Olé Olé's return to touring in 2017. On March 16 2017 Olé Olé performed in the Joy Eslava hall in Madrid.

In June 2017 an EP is published in digital format entitled "Olé Olé 2.0" that includes two new revisions of his greatest hits, "Déjame sola" and "Supernatural", again produced by Alejandro de Pinedo. On 30 June 2017 Olé Olé performs in Madrid at the World Pride 2017.

== Members ==
- Vicky Larraz (vocal, 1983–1985, 2013, 2016- )
- Juan Tarodo (drums, 1983–1993; died 2013)
- Emilio Estecha (electric bass, 1983–1991, 2013, 2016- )
- Luis Carlos Esteban (keyboard, 1983–1985, 2007)
- Gustavo Montesano (guitar, 1983–1993, 2007, 2013, 2016- )
- Marta Sánchez (vocal, 1986–1991)
- Marcelo Montesano (keyboard, 1986–1993, 2013, 2016- )
- Sonia Santana (vocal, 1992–1993, 2013)
- Marta Domínguez (vocal, 2007)

== Discography ==
=== Albums ===
Studio albums

- 1983: Olé Olé
- 1984: Voy a Mil
- 1986: Bailando sin Salir de Casa
- 1987: Los Caballeros las Prefieren Rubias
- 1988: Cuatro Hombres para Eva
- 1990: 1990
- 1992: Al Descubierto
- 2007: Grandes Éxitos y otras Terapias de Grupo (phase 4)
- 2016: Sin Control (duets)
- 2017: En Control
- 2017: Olé Olé 2.0 (EP with two songs in digital format)

In other languages

- 1991: Olé Olé (1990 in English)

Compilations

- 1991: Un golpe de suerte y otros grandes éxitos
- 1995: Lo mejor de los mejores: Olé Olé
- 2000: No controles
- 2001: Todas sus grabaciones en CBS (1983–1984)
- 2001: Lilí Marlén: Grandes éxitos
- 2010: Grandes éxitos (CD + DVD)
- 2014: Olé Olé Vol. 1 (1983–1984 y 1992) Todas sus grabaciones con Vicky Larraz y Sonia Santana
- 2014: Olé Olé Vol. 2 (1986–1990) Canciones y glamour. Todas sus grabaciones con Marta Sánchez
- 2014: Olé Olé: La colección definitiva
- 2015: Vicky Larraz: Llévatelo todo. Incluye los discos de Olé Olé: "Olé Olé" (1983) y "Voy a mil" (1984). Además, el siguiente material nunca antes publicado: "Concierto de 1983", los 4 temas grabados por Olé Olé en 2006 y numerosas rarezas.

=== Singles ===
Year	Title	Album
1983	No controles	Olé Olé
1983	Dame	Olé Olé
1983	Conspiración	Olé Olé
1983	Conspiracy	Conspiracy – Single
1983	Carmen (Conspiracy)	Single solo
1984	Adrenalina	Olé Olé
1984	Voy a mil	Voy a mil
1985	Caminemos	Voy a mil
1985	Lilí Marlén	Bailando sin salir de casa
1986	Bailando sin salir de casa	Bailando sin salir de casa
1986	Déjame sola	Bailando sin salir de casa
1986	Yo no me subo al coche de cualquiera	Bailando sin salir de casa
1987	Sola (con un desconocido)	Los caballeros las prefieren rubias
1987	Yo soy infiel	Los caballeros las prefieren rubias
1988	Secretos	Los caballeros las prefieren rubias
1988	La Bámbola	Los caballeros las prefieren rubias
1988	Supernatural	Cuatro hombres para Eva
1988	Vecina	Cuatro hombres para Eva
1988	Sólo es un viaje	Cuatro hombres para Eva
1989	Búscala	Cuatro hombres para Eva
1990	Soldados del amor	1990
1990	Con sólo una mirada	1990
1990	La chica ye-ye	1990
1991	Te daré todo	1990
1991	Love crusaders	Olé Olé (1990 en inglés)
1992	No mueras posibilidad	Al descubierto
1992	Volaba yo	Al descubierto
1993	Pero también te deseo	Al descubierto
1993	Adiós	Al descubierto
2007	Amor de aire	Grandes éxitos y otras terapias de grupo
2013	Por ser tú	Single solo
2016	Voy a mil (dueto con Munik)	2017
2017	Supernatural / Déjame sola	Olé Olé 2.0 (E.P.)
2017	Víctimas del desamor (tributo a VIDEO)	
2017	Bravo Samurai (30º aniversario)	

=== Videography ===
- 1983: No controles
- 1983: Conspiración
- 1986: Lilí Marlén
- 1986: Bailando sin salir de casa
- 1987: Yo soy infiel
- 1990: Soldados del amor
- 1990: Con solo una mirada
- 1992: No mueras posibilidad
- 1993: Adiós
- 2007: Amor de aire
- 2013: Por ser tú
