= List of members of the Slovenian Academy of Sciences and Arts =

List of members of Slovenian Academy of Sciences and Arts.

== A ==
Lidija Andolšek-Jeras † - Ivo Andrić † - Mihajlo Apostoloski † - Tatjana Avšič – Županc -

== B ==
Tadej Bajd - Anton Bajec † - Aleksander Bajt † - Krešimir Balenović † - Derek Harold Richard Barton † - Milan Bartoš † - Janez Batis † - Mirko Bedjanič † - Friedrich-Karl Beier † - Aleksandar Belić † - Alojz Benac † - František Benhart - Arthur E. Bergles † - Oton Berkopec † - Emerik Bernard - France Bernik - Janez Bernik - France Bevk † - France Bezlaj † - Robert Blinc † - Milan Bogdanović † - Jože Bole † - Matej Bor † - Nikolaj A. Borisevič † - Marja Boršnik † - Ivan Brajdić - Vladislav Brajković † - Ivan Bratko - Savo Bratos - Rajko Bratož - Matija Bravničar † - Bogdan Brecelj † - Matej Brešar - Anton Breznik † - Srečko Brodar † - Josip Broz - Tito † - Miroslav Brzin † - Zoran Bujas † - Vaso Butozan † -

== C ==
Antonio Cardesa - Reinhart Ceulemans - Henry R. Cooper mlajši - Izidor Cankar † - Emilijan Cevc † - Stojan Cigoj † - Johann Cilenšek † - Dragotin Cvetko † -

== Č ==
Edhem Čamo † - Franc Čelešnik † - Bojan Čerček - Avgust Černigoj † - Bojan Čop † - Vasa Čubrilović † -

== D ==
Aleksandar Despić † - Milan R. Dimitrijević - Davorin Dolar † - Vinko Dolenc - Matija Drovenik † -

Mirko Deanović † - Otto Demus † - Aleksandar Despić † - Jovan Djordjević † - Branislav Djurdjev † - Ilija Djuričić † - Metod Dolenc † - Lojze Dolinar † - Boris Drujan † - Ejnar Dyggve † -

== E ==
Norbert Elsner -

== F ==
Peter Fajfar - Arnold Feil - Dušan Ferluga - Evald Flisar - Aleksandar Flaker - Rudolf Flotzinger - Franc Forstnerič -

Janez Fettich † - Alojzij Finžgar † - Fran Saleški Finžgar † - Kurt von Fischer † - Aldo Franchini † - Ivo Frangeš † - Branko Fučić † -

== G ==
Stane Gabrovec † - Franci Gabrovšek - Ivan Gams † - Kajetan Gantar - Gerhard Giesemann - Paul Gleirscher - Josip Globevnik - Matija Gogala - Ljubo Golič - Wolfgang L. Gombocz - Peter Gosar - Igor Grabec - Niko Grafenauer - Stanko Grafenauer - Drago Grdenić - Irena Grickat-Radulović -

Maksim Gaspari † - Milovan Gavazzi † - Leon Geršković † - Ferdo Gestrin † - Otto F. Geyer † - Velibor Gligorić † - Pavel Golia † - Jože Goričar † - Anton Grad † - Alojz Gradnik † - Bogo Grafenauer † - Ivan Grafenauer † - Milan Grošelj † - Franc Gubenšek † - Branimir Gušić † - Ludvik Gyergyek † -

== H ==
Dušan Hadži - Jovan Hadži † - Stanislav Hafner - Erwin Louis Hahn - Nikola Hajdin - Toshihiro Hamano - Peter Handke - Ljudmil Hauptman † - Harald zur Hausen - Krsto Hegedušić † - Milan Herak - Andrej Hieng † - Matija Horvat † - Lukas Conrad Hottinger † - Valentin Hribar - Vil Hrymyč -

== I ==
Miodrag Ibrovac † - Ljudevit Ilijanić - Svetozar Ilešič † - Anton Ingolič † - Andrej Inkret † - Milka Ivić - Pavle Ivić † -

== J ==
Božidar Jakac † - Rihard Jakopič † - Franc Jakopin † - Matija Jama † - Andrej Jemec - Drago Jančar - Dimitrije Jovčić † - Janko Jurančič † -

== K ==
Hans-Dietrich Kahl - Boris Kalin † - Zdenko Kalin † - Vinko Kambič † - Stevan Karamata † - Edvard Kardelj † - Alan R. Katritzky † - Roman Kenk † - Gabrijel Kernel - Matjaž Kmecl - Dušan Kermavner † - Taras Kermauner - Boštjan Kiauta - Boris Kidrič † - France Kidrič † - Mile Klopčič † - France Koblar † - Vanda Kochansky-Devidé † - Franjo Kogoj † - Blaže Koneski † - Zoran Konstantinović - Marjan Kordaš - Viktor Korošec † - Božidar Kos † - Gojmir Anton Kos † - Janko Kos - Milko Kos † - Ciril Kosmač † - Kajetan Kovič † - Alojz Kralj - Andrej Kranjc - Jože Krašovec - Metka Krašovec † - Ivan Kreft - Uroš Krek † - Leopold Kretzenbacher -

Georg Kossack † - Marko Kostrenčić † - Alija Košir † - Lojze Kovačič † - Juš Kozak † - Marjan Kozina † - Venčeslav Koželj † - Miško Kranjec † - Stane Krašovec † - Josef Kratochvíl † - Miroslav Kravar † - Ivo Krbek † - Bratko Kreft † - Gojmir Krek (tudi Gregor Krek) † - Gustav Krklec † - Miroslav Krleža † - Anton Kuhelj † - Othmar Kühn † - Filip Kalan Kumbatovič † - Niko Kuret † - Ljubov' Viktorovna Kurkina - Gorazd Kušej † - Rado Kušej † - Rudi Kyovsky † -

== L ==
Abel Lajtha - Janez Lamovec - Reinhard Lauer - Anton Lajovic † - Emmanuel Laroche † - Ivan Lavrač † - Božidar Lavrič † - Janko Lavrin † - Lojze Lebič - Henry Leeming † - Jean-Marie Pierre Lehn - Rado L. Lenček † - Janez Levec - Florjan Lipuš - Feliks Lobe † - Janez Logar † - Valentin Logar † - Zdravko Lorković † - Thomas Luckmann - Radomir Lukić † - Franc Ksaver Lukman † - Pavel Lunaček † -

== M ==
Milan Maceljski - Jože Maček - Boris Majer - Sibe Mardešić - Juraj Martinović - Milko Matičetov † - Janez Matičič - Ernest Mayer † - Anne McLaren † - Vasilij Melik † - Janez Menart † - Gian Carlo Menis - Eugene Mylon Merchant - Pavle Merkù † - Dragan D. Mihailovic - Slavko Mihalič - Milan Mihelič - Emili Joseph Milič - Ivan Minatti † - Zdravko Mlinar - Jože Mlinarič - Dušan Moravec † - Leszek Moszyński - Karl Alexander Müller - Hermann Müller-Karpe - Marko Mušič - Zoran Mušič † -

Desanka Maksimović † - Janez Matjašič † - Esad Mekuli † - Anton Melik † - Janez Menart † - Boris Merhar † - Kiril Micevski † - Mihajlo Lj. Mihajlović † - France Mihelič † - Janez Milčinski † - Lev Milčinski † - Andre Mohorovičić † - Vojeslav Molé † - Matija Murko † - Marjan Mušič † -

== N ==
Rajko Nahtigal † - Vladimir A. Negovski † - Velimir Neidhardt - Zdeněk Nejedlý † - Robert Neubauer † - Rudolf Neuhäuser - Jean Nicod - Kazimierz Nitsch † - Jean Nougayrol † - Franc Novak † - Grga Novak † -

== O ==
Anton Ocvirk † - Wacław Olszak † - Valentin Oman - Janez Orešnik - Karel Oštir † -

== P ==
Boris Pahor † - Luko Paljetak - Boris Paternu - Tone Pavček † - Marijan Pavčnik - Branko Pavičević - Janez Peklenik - Slobodan Perović - Márton Pécsi - Raša Pirc - Jože Pirjevec - Mario Pleničar - Janko Pleterski - Boris Podrecca - Livio Poldini - Andrej Vladimirovič Popov - Bogdan Povh † - Otto Prokop - Eugen Pusić † -

Dimitar Panteleev † - Alfonz Pavlin † - Todor Pavlov † - Leonid Semenovič Persianinov † - Anton Peterlin † - Leonid Pitamic † - Jože Plečnik † - Josip Plemelj † - Jože Pogačnik † - Janko Polec † - Ivan Potrč † - Vladimir Prelog † - Stojan Pretnar † - Dušan C. Prevoršek † -

== R ==
Chintamani Nagesa Ramachandra Rao - Fran Ramovš † - Alojz Rebula - Uroš Rojko - Helmut Rumpler - Veljko Rus - Ivan Rakovec † - Alfred Rammelmeyer † - Fran Ramovš † - Primož Ramovš † - Zoran Rant † - Edvard Ravnikar † - Karl Heinz Rechinger † - Ivan Regen † - Jakob Rigler † -

== S ==
Gregor Serša - Roy Thomas Severn - Primož Simoniti - Uroš Skalerič - Janez Sketelj - Marko Snoj - Slavko Splichal - Jan Stankowski - Janez Stanonik † - Marija Stanonik - Branko Stanovnik - Dimitrije Stefanović - Erik Valdemar Stĺlberg - Jože Straus - Franc Strle - Ivo Supičić - Saša Svetina -

Harald Saeverud † - Peter Safar † - Marijan Salopek † - Maks Samec † - Pavle Savić † - Ferdinand Seidl † - Savin Sever † - Jakov Sirotković † - Petar Skok † - Anton Slodnjak † - Anica Sodnik-Zupanc † - Anton Sovré † - Siniša Stanković † - France Stelé † - Pavel Stern † - Petar Stevanović † - Gabrijel Stupica † - Gunnar Olaf Svane† - János Szentágothai † -

== Š ==
Jaroslav Šašel † - Tomaž Šalamun † - Rudi Šeligo † - Alenka Šelih - Alojz Šercelj - Jaroslav Šidak † - Lucijan Marija Škerjanc † - Milan Škerlj † - Stanko Škerlj † - Janko Šlebinger † - Makso Šnuderl † - Peter Štih - Andrija Štampar † - Lujo Šuklje † -

== T ==
Sergio Tavano - Biba Teržan - Miha Tišler † - Miha Tomaževič - Jože Toporišič † - Jože Trontelj - Drago Tršar - Dragica Turnšek -

Alois Tavčar † - Igor Tavčar † - Alan John Percival Taylor † - Lucien Tesnière † - Kosta Todorović † - Božena Tokarz - Nikita Iljič Tolstoj † - Rajko Tomović † - Rudolf Trofenik † - Anton Trstenjak † -

== U ==
Felix Unger -

Jože Udovič † - Aleš Ušeničnik † -

== V ==
Sergej Ivanovič Vavilov † - Lado Vavpetič † - Franc Veber † - Ivan Vidav † - Josip Vidmar † - Milan Vidmar † - Sergij Vilfan † - John Villadsen - Lojze Vodovnik † - Vale Vouk † - Anton Vratuša - Igor Vrišer † - Dimitrije Vučenov † -

== W ==
John S. Waugh † - Anton Wernig - Herwig Wolfram - Frank Wollman † - Karl Matej Woschitz - Maks Wraber † -

== Z ==
Marijan Zadnikar - Franc Zadravec - Ciril Zlobec † - Robert Zorec - Zinka Zorko - Mitja Zupančič -

Marijan Zadnikar † - Dane Zajc † - Vilem Závada † - Boris Ziherl † - Rihard Zupančič † - Fran Zwitter † -

== Ž ==
Boštjan Žekš - Slavoj Žižek - Zinka Zorko † - Andrej O. Župančič - Oton Župančič † -
