= Grafenauer =

Grafenauer is a Slovenian surname related to the German toponym Grafenau.

Notable people with this surname include:

- Bogo Grafenauer (1916–1995), Slovenian historian
- Irena Grafenauer (born 1957), Slovenian flute player
- Ivan Grafenauer (1880–1964), Slovenian literature historian
- Niko Grafenauer (born 1940), Slovenian author
- Stanko Grafenauer (1922–2010), Slovenian mining engineer and mineralogist
