= List of Slovenian chemists =

A list of notable chemists from Slovenia:

== D ==
- Davorin Dolar (1921–2005)

== G ==
- Franc Gubenšek

== K ==
- Ana Mayer Kansky (1895–1962)
- Drago Kolar (1932–2000)

== P ==
- Friderik Pregl (1869–1930)

== S ==
- Branko Stanovnik (1932-)

== Š ==
- Ana Štěrba-Böhm (1885–1936)
