= Stanovnik =

Stanovnik is a surname. Notable people with the surname include:

- Andrés Stanovnik (born 1949), Roman Catholic prelate
- Branko Stanovnik (born 1938), Slovene chemist
- Janez Stanovnik (1922–2020), Slovene politician
