= Darja Lisjak =

Slovenian material scientist

Darja Lisjak is a Slovenian material scientist and professor at the Department for Material Synthesis at Jozef Stefan Institute in Ljubljana, Slovenia. Her work focuses on materials chemistry, nanotechnology, and solid-state chemistry.

== Education and career ==
Lisjak earned her PhD in chemistry and chemical technology from the University of Ljubljana in 1999.

== Selected publications ==
- Mertelj, Alenka, et al. "Ferromagnetism in suspensions of magnetic platelets in liquid crystal." Nature 504.7479 (2013): 237-241.
- Lisjak, Darja, and Alenka Mertelj. "Anisotropic magnetic nanoparticles: A review of their properties, syntheses and potential applications." Progress in Materials Science 95 (2018): 286-328.
- Mertelj, Alenka, et al. "Magneto-optic and converse magnetoelectric effects in a ferromagnetic liquid crystal." Soft Matter 10.45 (2014): 9065-9072.
