= Anton Ingolič =

Slovene writer, playwright and editor

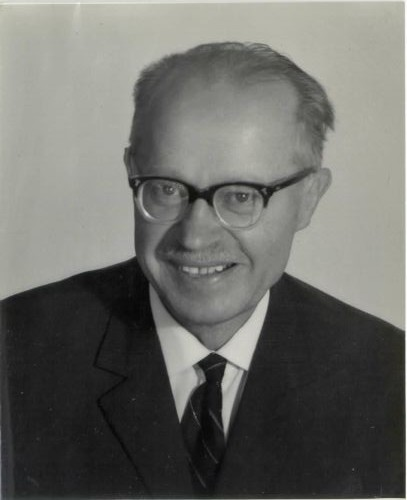
- Anton Ingolič in the 1960s
- Born: 5 January 1907; Spodnja Polskava, Duchy of Styria, Austria-Hungary (now in Slovenia)
- Died: 11 March 1992 (aged 85); Ljubljana, Slovenia
- Occupations: Writer, playwright, editor
- Writing career
- Notable works: Tajno društvo PGC, Gimnazijka, Tako je bilo
- Notable awards: Prešeren Award; 1949 for his novel Pot po nasipu Prešeren Award; 1978 for his youth and adult literature

Anton Ingolič (5 January 1907 – 11 March 1992) was a Slovene writer, playwright, and editor. He is best known for his novels and youth literature.

Ingolič was born in Spodnja Polskava near Slovenska Bistrica in the Austro-Hungarian Duchy of Styria (present-day eastern Slovenia). He went to the local school and completed his secondary education in Maribor before studying in Ljubljana and Paris. He worked as a secondary-school Slovene and French language teacher in Ptuj, Maribor, and Ljubljana. He was editor of the journal Nova Obzorja and became a member of the Slovenian Academy of Sciences and Arts in 1976.

He won the Prešeren Award twice, in 1949 for his novel Pot po nasipu and in 1978 for his literary opus for youth and adults. Between 1961 and 1963 he was president of the Slovene Writers' Association.

The primary school in Spodnja Polskava is named after Ingolič.

== Published works ==
=== Young adult literature ===
- Udarna brigada ("The Udarnik Brigade", 1946)
- Deček z dvema imenoma ("The Boy with Two Names", 1955)
- Tvegana pot ("The Risky Path", 1955)
- Tačko v velikem svetu ("Little Paw in the Great Big World", 1957)
- Tajno društvo PGC ("The Secret Society PGC", 1958)
- Mladost na stopnicah ("Youth in the Stairwell", 1962)
- Enajstorica živih ("Eleven Alive", 1964)
- Gimnazijka ("The [female] Gymnasium Pupil", 1967)
- Deklica iz Chicaga ("The Girl from Chicago", 1969)
- Zgodbe vesele in žalostne ("Happy Tales and Sad", 1971)
- Potopljena galeja ("The Sunken Galley", 1973)
- Diamanti, ribe in samovar ("Diamonds, Fish, and a Samovar", 1974)
- Deklica na sončnem žarku ("The Girl on the Sunbeam", 1976)
- Ptiček brez kljunčka ("Little Bird Without a Beak", 1977)
- Srečanje s podvodnim konjem ("A Meeting with the Hippopotamus", 1978)
- Bila sem izgnanka ("I Was a Refugee", 1979)
- Zgodbe mojega jutra ("Tales of my Morning", 1979)
- Moje pisateljevanje ("My Scribbling", 1980)
- Velika stavka ("The Great Strike", 1980)
- Zaupno ("Confidential", 1981)
- Nemir mladostnika ("The Disquiet of the Youth", 1982)
- Rokove zgodbice ("Rok's Little Tales", 1983)
- Čudovita pot ("The Wondrous Voyage", 1986)
- Leta dozorevanja ("Years of Maturation", 1987)

=== Prose for adults ===
- Mlada leta ("The Young Years", 1935)
- Lukarji ("The Onion Growers", 1936)
- Soseska ("The Neighborhood", 1939)
- Na splavih ("On the Rafts", 1940)
- Matevž Visočnik (1941)
- Pred sončnim vzhodom ("Before Sunrise", 1945)
- Vinski vrh ("Vinsko Hilltop", 1946)
- Pot po nasipu ("The Path by the Embankment", 1948)
- Na prelomu ("On the Breaking Point", 1950)
- Stavka ("Strike", 1951)
- Človek na meji ("Man at the Border", 1952)
- Sončna reber ("Rib of the Sun", 1953)
- Tam gori za hramom ("Blaze Behind the Vinyard Barn", 1956)
- Ugasla dolina ("The Extinguished Valley", 1956)
- Kje ste, Lamutovi? ("Where Are You, O Lamut Family?", 1958)
- Vidim te, Veronika! ("I Can See You, Veronica!", 1959)
- Črni labirinti ("Black Labyrinths", 1960)
- Nebo nad domačijo ("Sky over the Homestead", 1960)
- Oči ("Papa", 1962)
- Pri naših v Ameriki ("With Our Own in America", 1964)
- Lastovka čez ocean ("A Swallow Across the Ocean", 1966)
- Sibirska srečanja ("Siberian Encounters", 1966)
- Šumijo gozdovi domači ("The Forests of Home Rustle Softly", 1969)
- Pretrgana naveza ("Ragged Connection", 1971)
- Delovni dan sestre Marje ("The Workday of Marja the Nurse", 1980)
- Obračun ("A Settling of Accounts", 1982)
- Človek, ne jezi se! ("Don't Have a Cow, Man!", 1984)
- Podobe njenega življenja ("Images of Her Life", 1985)
- Zgodilo se je ("It Did Happen", 1986)
- Družinski festival ("Family Festival", 1988)
- Poslavljanje ("The Farewell", 1989)
- Tako je bilo ("That is How it Was", 1992)
- Črni kurent ("The Black Kurent", 1993)

Historical novels

- Mlatilnica-Lovorjev venec ("The Threshing floor - The Laurel Wreath", 1948)
- Likof-Mejnik ("Likof the Neighbor", 1950)
- Našli so se ("They Found Themselves", 1952)
- Pradedje ("Ancestral Fathers", 1975)
- Gorele so grmade ("The Stakes Blazed", 1977)
