= Zdravko Mlinar =

Retired Slovene sociologist

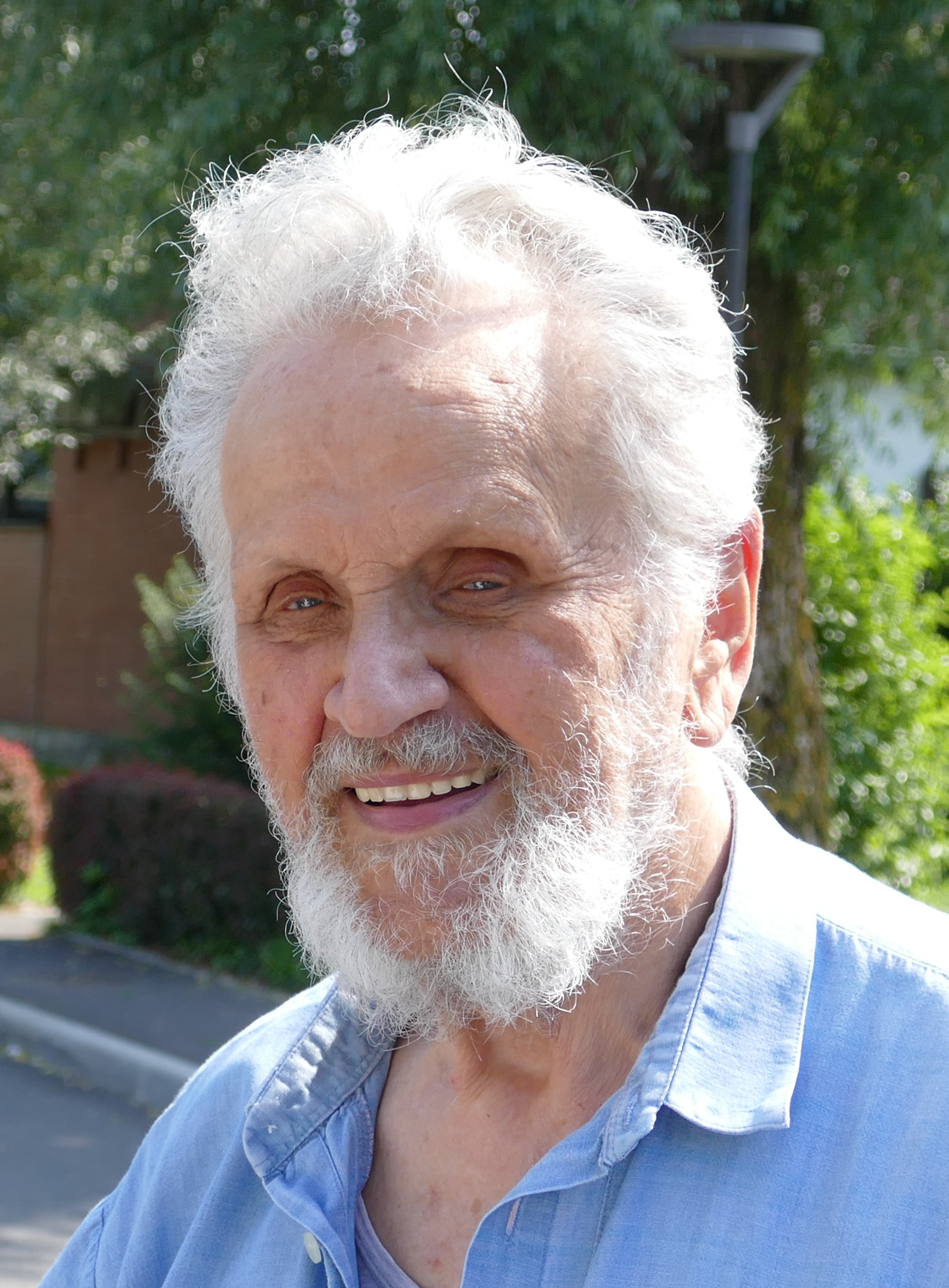
Zdravko Mlinar

Zdravko Mlinar (born 30 January 1933) is a retired Slovene sociologist, Doctor of Social and Political Sciences, Professor of Spatial Sociology, Professor Emeritus at the University of Ljubljana, and a member of the Slovenian and Croatian Academy of Sciences.

== Education ==
Mlinar finished high school in Ljubljana and graduated from the Ljubljana Faculty of Law in 1958. As a postgraduate student, he studied sociology at the Institute of Social Sciences in Belgrade. In 1960, he became an assistant professor in Sociology at the Faculty of Law in Ljubljana, and earned his PhD in 1967.

== Career ==
From 1963 to 1968, he worked as a researcher at the Institute of Sociology and Philosophy. He joined the Faculty of Social Sciences in 1968, first as an associate professor and then in 1974 as a full professor until his retirement in 1997. Between 1974 and 1976, he was dean of the faculty. As a researcher, Mlinar founded the Centre for Spatial Sociology, which focuses on the interdisciplinary studies of spatial, urban, and landscape planning.

Mlinar was elected an associate member of the Slovenian Academy of Sciences and Arts (SASA) in 1981 and a full member in 1987. He was head of the Department of Social Sciences and the secretary of the first Section for Historical and Social Sciences.

=== Spatial sociology ===
Mlinar was the first person to internationally conceive the research and lecturing of spatial sociology. He considered it in the broader context of the multi-level interpretations of socio-structural change and the role of actors in it. In doing so, Mlinar integrated and transcended the frameworks of urban and rural sociology, local self-government, and regional research, revealing the regularities of social change, particularly in terms of individualization and socialisation processes, globalisation, and informatisation.

He studied the dynamics of the interpenetration and exclusion of opposites, transcending the outdated notions of the zero-sum game logic between local and global, homogenisation, diversification, and de-territorialisation and re-territorialisation. He interpreted social transformation as the freeing up of actors and their overcoming of divisions arising from spatial, temporal, sectoral, and hierarchical organisation.

He explored changes in the spatial organisation of public and private life, with a focus on the genuine sphere of the life of the inhabitants’ actual participation, influence and contacts in space. With Henry Teune, he co-authored The Developmental Logic of Social Systems (1978) which Encyclopedia Britannica listed among the "grand theories" concerning social development in the context of centuries of change.

=== Founder ===
Mlinar is considered to be one of the key founders and visionaries enforcing spatial sociology both nationally and internationally. He has worked towards professionalization and socialization of sociology (public sociology). He is one of the co-founders and the first President of the Slovenian Sociological Society and was President of the Yugoslav Sociological Association.

He conceptualized and led a series of scientific meetings in Slovenia and during eight world congresses of the International Sociological Association (ISA), in which he was also Chairman and Vice-Chairman of two of its research committees and co-founder of the working group of Sociology of local-global relations.

=== Collaborations ===
As a professor and researcher, Mlinar collaborated with numerous universities and scientific institutions around the world, including the University of Pennsylvania, Philadelphia, University of Oregon, Eugene, State University of New York at Buffalo, Centre for International Studies – Cornell University, Ithaca, University of North Carolina, Chapel Hill, Institute of Development Studies – University of Sussex, Brighton, Circom (Centre International de Recherches sur les Communautés Coopératives Rurales ), Tel Aviv, Istituto di sociologia internazionale, Gorizia, Instytut Filozofii i Socjologii, PAN, Warsaw, The Rockefeller Foundation Bellagio Center, Inter-University Centre for Postgraduate Studies Dubrovnik, "Inter-Agency Mission" (ILO, FAO, UNESCO, UNIDO) in Ceylon, Colombo, Wiener Institut für Entwicklungsfragen, Vienna, Bartlett School of Architecture and Planning, London, and the Faculty of Architecture, Belgrade.

Additionally, he was invited to deliver a number of ad hoc lectures, including at the Institut d'Etudes Politiques de Paris-Sorbonne, Paris, the University of Trier, Trier, and the Slovak Academy of Sciences.

=== Bibliography ===
His bibliography includes almost 1,000 units. He is the author or co-author of more than 20 publications, which have appeared internationally in over 20 journals (in eight foreign languages) and in about 30 Slovenian and Yugoslav journals. These include the International Journal of Urban and Regional Research, Annals of the American Academy of Political and Social Sciences, International Journal of Sociology and Social Policy, Architecture et Comportment, Espaces et Sociétés, Studia sociologiczno-politiczne, Comparative Political Studies, Sociologičeskie issledovaniâ, Revue de l'Est, La ricerca sociale, Sociologia urbana e rurale, and International Journal of Sociology of Language.

=== Science journals ===
In addition, he was a member of the editorial boards and committees of the following social science journals: Space and Polity, International Journal of Sociology and Social Policy, International Journal of Sociology, La ricerca sociale, The Journal of Conflict Resolution, International Studies Quarterly, Regional Contact, and correspondent/assistant editor for the journal Espaces et Sociétés. He is also Chairman of the Editorial Advisory Board of Teorija in praksa and Žirovski občasnik.

== Works ==
His works include: Social Participation of Citizens in Local Community (1965), People in the new town: Velenje (1965), Sociology of the Local Communities (1974), Local Government and Rural Development (1974); The Developmental Logic of Social Systems (along with lead author Henry Teune), (1978); Social Ecology of Change (lead author) (1978); Humanisation of the City (1983); Contradictions of Social Development (1986), Globalization and Territorial Identities (co-author) (1992); Individualisation and Globalisation in Space (1994), co-authored Autonomy and Connectedness in the European space (1995), Living Environment in the Global Information Age: Spatio-Temporal Organization of Living (2008); Globalization: Enrichments and/or Threats (2012).

The books On Sociological Revealing of Living in Time and Space (2010), and Challenges of Globalisation and Sociology of Zdravko Mlinar (2014) – both of them being thematic issues of Teorija in praksa - were dedicated to the 50th anniversary of the sociology of Zdravko Mlinar.

== Awards ==
He has been awarded as an honorary member of the Slovenian Sociological Society in 1980, the Student Award of the University Council, University of Ljubljana in 1958, and the Boris Kidrič award for his book Humanisation of the City (1985). The SFRY Presidency decoration – Order of the Golden Wreath in 1983, and the book Contradictions of Social Development was labeled as "The best book in the field of the social sciences in Yugoslavia", in 1987.

The Republic of Slovenia Award was given for outstanding achievements in the field of sociology in 1995; decorated with the Honorary President of the Republic of Slovenia symbol of freedom in 2002. An award was also given for "outstanding services and achievements in spreading the reputation of the Faculty of Social Sciences" in 2009.
