= Frajštajn =

- Location in Slovenia
- Coordinates: 46°25′00″N 15°37′47″E
- Country: Slovenia
- Traditional region: Styria
- Statistical region: Drava
- Municipality: Slovenska Bistrica
- Elevation: 267 m (876 ft)

Frajštajn (pronounced [ˈfɾaːi̯ʃtai̯n], German: Freistein) is a former settlement in the Municipality of Slovenska Bistrica in northeastern Slovenia. It is now part of the village of Spodnja Polskava. The area is part of the traditional region of Styria and is now included with the rest of the municipality in the Drava Statistical Region.

== Geography ==
Frajštajn lies northwest of the village center of Spodnja Polskava, along Mill Creek (Slovene: Mlinski potok), east of the A1 freeway.

== Name ==
Frajštain is named after Frajštajn Castle (Slovene: Grad Frajštajn, German: Freistein, Freyenstein).

== History ==
Frajštajn had a population of 205 living in 35 houses in 1870 and 255 living in 37 houses in 1880. Frajštajn was annexed by Spodnja Polskava in 1955, ending its existence as a separate settlement.

== Cultural heritage ==
Frajštajn Castle is a three-story rectangular structure (with an addition on the back) that was built in the Renaissance style around 1570 on the site of an earlier structure called Rosenberghof, which had burned. The property was acquired by the Counts of Celje in 1376 and then owned by the Tattenbachs in the 17th century, who lost the property due to their involvement in the Magnate conspiracy. The year 1643 is carved on the well in front of the castle, probably referring to the year the structure was renovated after being damaged in a peasant rebellion in 1635. The castle was formerly connected to Rače Castle by a tunnel.
