= Dragan D. Mihailović =

Slovenian physicist researching quantum materials

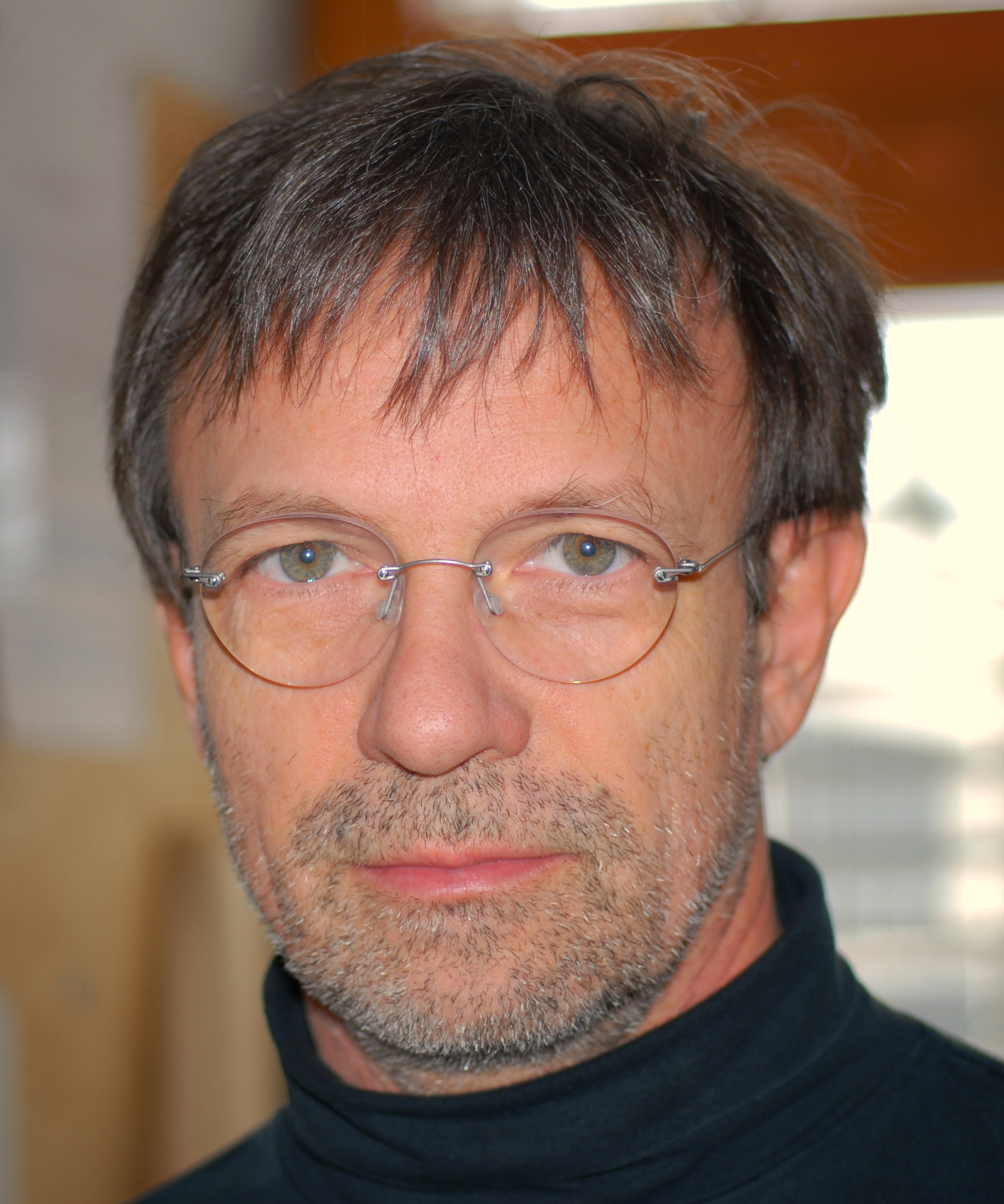
Dragan Mihailović

Dragan D. Mihailović (born 1958 in Novi Sad) is a Slovenian physicist, working as a research scientist at the Jožef Stefan Institute, leading a research group on non-equilibrium studies of quantum materials. The group's research includes temporal studies of electronic phase transitions, mainly superconductivity and electronic crystals. He is currently acting director of the CENN Nanocenter, Professor of physics at the University of Ljubljana and the Jožef Stefan International Postgraduate School and Head of Department of Complex Matter at the Jožef Stefan Institute in Ljubljana, Slovenia.

== Education and career ==
Mihailović was educated in (Ljubljana) Yugoslavia, Washington DC and Magdalen College School, Oxford. He received a degree in physics at the University of Oxford in 1979. and a D.Phil at the University of Oxford in 1983 as a member of Balliol College.

Since 1983, he has been employed at the Jožef Stefan Institute, a post-doctoral researcher at UC Santa Barbara and sabbatical at the Dept. of Physics in Oxford. At the Jožef Stefan Institute, he set up new laboratories for short-time spectroscopy, nanoelectronics and time-resolved multiprobe tunneling microscopy and an advanced quantum devices laboratory jointly with the CENN Nanocenter. In 2002, he founded the Department for Complex Matter. He is the director of the Center of Excellence for Nanosciences and Nanotechnologies (CENN), which he founded in 2004. In the years 2010–2020, he was the president of the scientific council of the Jožef Stefan Institute, and in 2016–2020, the president of the Society of Mathematicians, Physicists and Astronomers of Slovenia (DMFA).

He has been a member of the Slovenian academy of engineers since 1995 and in 2021, he was elected as member of Slovenian Academy of Sciences and Arts. In 2025 he became an honorary member of the Society of Mathematicians, Physicists and Astronomers of Slovenia (DMFA).

His current interest is the study of mesoscopic metastable quantum states created through non-equilibrium processes using time-resolved methods in combination with scanning tunnelling microscopy and charge configuration topological memory devices.

== Awards and honors ==
In 2002, he won the Zois Prize for outstanding scientific achievements, in 1989 he won the Fulbright scholarship, in 1988 he was a "Honorary members of the High Table", Christ Church, University of Oxford, England. In 1986, he won the award of the Boris Kidrič Foundation. In 2012, he was the first in Slovenia to receive a subsidy from the European Research Council (ERC Advanced grant) in the field of phase transitions in time using femtosecond spectroscopy and has held 4 ERC research grants.
