= Milko Kos Historical Institute =

Slovene research institute

The Milko Kos Historical Institute (Slovene: Zgodovinski inštitut Milka Kosa) is a scientific and research institute under the patronage of the Research Centre of the Slovenian Academy of Sciences and Arts. Its mission is the study of Slovenian history from its beginnings to the end of the World War I. The institute's research work is carried out in the form of programmes and projects and follows the guidelines, put forth by the Slovenian Academy of Sciences and Arts:

- publication of sources concerning Slovenian history,
- studies of historical topography and colonization of Slovenian territory,
- studies of economic and social history of Slovenians,
- problems of the 19th century and the first decades of the 20th century Slovenian history

Founded in 1947, the institute was originally conceived as the Section of General and National History at the Institute of history, which was headed by professor Milko Kos. In 1972 the presidium of the Slovenian Academy of Sciences and Arts resolved to transform the Section into an independent Institute of General and National History. The latter got its present-day name in 1977.
