= Ivan Grafenauer =

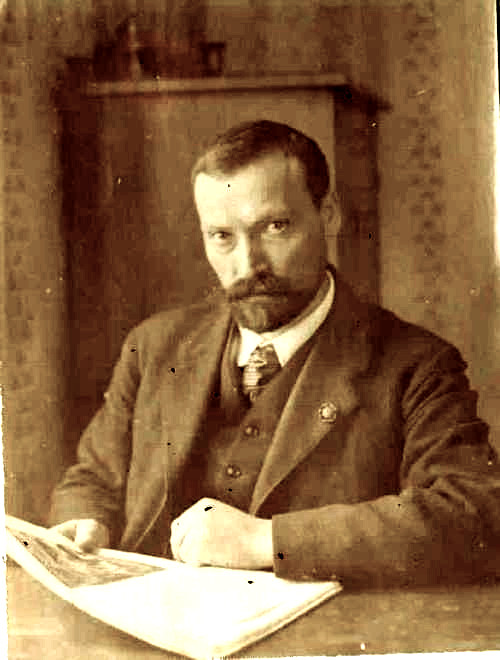
- Ivan Grafenauer in the 1920s

Ivan Grafenauer (7 March 1880 – 29 December 1964) was a Slovenian literary historian and ethnologist of Carinthian Slovene origin.

He was born as Johann Grafenauer, as an illegitimate child of Michael Grafenauer and Elisabeth Flaschberger, in the village of Micheldorf (Slovene: Velika ves) near Hermagor in Carinthia, now part of Austria. At that time, Micheldorf was the westernmost Slovene-inhabited village, not only in Carinthia, but in all the Slovene ethnic territory. His father was a local Slovene cultural activist, and his uncle, Franc Grafenauer, was a Slovene politician and member of the Austrian Imperial Council. After finishing high school in Villach in 1900, he enrolled at the University of Vienna, where he studied Slavic and German philology. Between 1904 and 1908, he taught at the high school in Kranj and from 1908 in Ljubljana. He obtained a PhD at the University of Vienna in 1917 and a habilitation at the University of Zagreb in 1919.

Grafenauer published most of his works in the period between World War I and World War II. He mostly researched the medieval literature in the Slovene Lands, advancing a thesis on an uninterrupted tradition of vernacular literature in Slovene during this period. Among his most important works is a thorough analysis of the Freising manuscripts. After 1940, he dedicated himself almost exclusively to the research of Slovene folk poetry. Many of his articles were published in the prestigious Catholic cultural magazine Dom in svet. In 1940, he became a member of the Slovenian Academy of Sciences and Arts.

He died in Ljubljana.

He was the father of the historian Bogo Grafenauer, the mineralogist Stanko Grafenauer, and the designer Marija Grafenauer Vogelnik, the uncle of the poet Niko Grafenauer, and the grandfather of the flautist Irena Grafenauer.
