= Bogo Grafenauer =

Slovenian historian

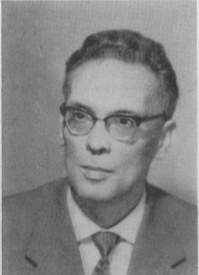
- Bogo Grafenauer in 1968
- Born: Bogoslav Alojzij Janez Grafenauer; 16 March 1916
- Died: May 12, 1995 (aged 79)
- Spouse: Marica (born Dobovišek)
- Children: Darja Mihelič, Mojca Pocajt
- Parent(s): Ivan Grafenauer, Ljudmila (born Dolžan)
- Relatives: Irena Grafenauer, Stanko Grafenauer, Niko Grafenauer

Academic work
- Discipline: Historian

Bogo Grafenauer (16 March 1916 – 12 May 1995) was a Slovenian historian, who mostly wrote about medieval history in the Slovene Lands. Together with Milko Kos, Fran Zwitter, and Vasilij Melik, he was one of the founders of the so-called Ljubljana school of historiography.

== Early life ==
He was born in Ljubljana in a well-established Carinthian Slovene family. His father, Ivan Grafenauer, was a famous literary historian and ethnologist and nephew of Franc Grafenauer, a representative in the Carinthian provincial assembly and representative of Carinthia in Vienna parliament. He was the brother of the mineralogist Stanko Grafenauer and the designer, architect and choreographer Marija Grafenauer-Vogelnik. He was father of the historian Darja Mihelič and also the uncle of the flautist Irena Grafenauer and artist Eka Vogelnik.

He studied history at the University of Ljubljana, graduating in 1940. In his college years, he joined the Christian left intellectual circle around Edvard Kocbek. After the Axis invasion of Yugoslavia in April 1941, he joined the Liberation Front of the Slovenian People. Between 1942 and 1943, the Italian Fascist occupation authorities interned him in the Gonars concentration camp. Nevertheless, he managed to complete his PhD dissertation in 1944 under the supervision of the medievalist Milko Kos.

== Career ==
Grafenauer started publishing already in the late 1930s. In his academic career, Grafenauer focused on social history in the Middle Ages. He continued the researches of Milko Kos on settlements patterns in the Slovene Lands in the Early Middle Ages, focusing on the Slavic settlement of the Eastern Alps and the medieval Slavic principality of Carantania. He wrote several treatises on the transition between tribal and feudal socio-economic forms in the Eastern Alps and the west Balkans. His main contribution was however the history of the German Peasants' Wars in the late 15th and 16th century in the Slovene Lands and in Croatia. He also wrote on the history of the Slovenes in Carinthia in the 19th and 20th centuries, and on agricultural modernization in the early 19th century. Since the 1950s and 1960s, he was among those who introduced the approaches of the French Annales school in the Yugoslav historiography.

Between 1945 and 1955, he wrote several expert surveys on border areas in Carinthia and the Julian March for the Yugoslav diplomacy.

From 1946 to 1982, he taught Slovene medieval history and theory of historiography at the University of Ljubljana. He was also the first editor-in-chief of Zgodovinski časopis, the leading Slovenian historical journal. In 1972, he became a member of the Slovenian Academy of Sciences and Arts. He was also a member of the Yugoslav Academy of Sciences and Arts and the Academy of Sciences and Arts of Bosnia and Herzegovina. Between 1978 and 1987, he served as president of the publishing house Slovenska matica; during his presidency, Grafenauer hired several prominent external collaborators, some of whom (like Ivo Urbančič, Tine Hribar and Drago Jančar) had been persecuted by the Communist regime, raising the quality and reputation of the institution.

In the last decade of his life, Grafenauer rose to prominence again with his resolute fight against autochthonist re-interpretations of Slovenian history, especially against the populist Venetic theory, which denied the Slavic settlement in the East Alps.

Bogo Grafenauer died in Ljubljana and was buried in the Žale cemetery. His daughter, Darja Mihelič, is also a historian.
