= Woschitz =

Woschitz is a surname. Notable people with the surname include:

- Karl Matthäus Woschitz (born 1937), Austrian theologian and bible scholar
- Thomas Woschitz (born 1968), Austrian film director, screenwriter, and film editor
