= Josip Globevnik =

Slovenian mathematician

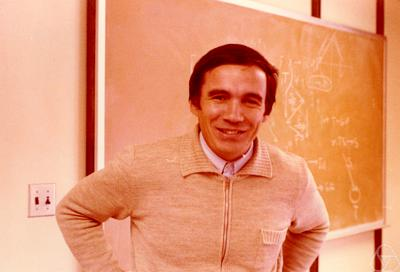
Josip Globevnik

Josip Globevnik (born December 6, 1945, in Ljubljana, Yugoslavia) is a Slovenian mathematician.

Globevnik graduated in 1968 and obtained his PhD in 1972 at the Faculty of Natural Sciences and Technology (FNT) of University of Ljubljana. He worked on the Faculty of Civil Engineering and Geodesy between 1969 and 1988, also as an associate professor (1978) and professor of mathematics (1983). From 1988 on he taught as a professor of mathematical analysis in the FNT and later the Faculty of Mathematics and Physics.

He taught as a guest on universities in the U.S. (1973/74, 1978/79, 1983–1985). For a shorter time, he visited several universities in Europe, Brazil, and Israel.

Globevnik's main research interest is complex analysis. He published around 50 articles in international journals. Since 1985 he has been a correspondence member and since 1989 a regular member of the Slovenian Academy of Sciences and Arts.

In 1976, he was awarded with Kidric Award.
