= Marko Snoj =

Slovenian linguist (born 1959)

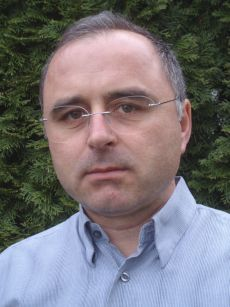
- Snoj in 2008
- Born: 19 April 1959 (age 66); Ljubljana, PR Slovenia, Yugoslavia
- Occupations: Indo-Europeanist, Slavist, Albanologist, etymologist

Marko Snoj (born 19 April 1959) is a Slovenian Indo-Europeanist, Slavist, Albanologist, lexicographer, and etymologist employed at the Fran Ramovš Institute for Slovene Language of the Scientific Research Center of the Slovenian Academy of Sciences and Arts in Ljubljana, Slovenia. He served as director of the institute from 2008 to 2018. He has made numerous scholarly contributions to Indo-European linguistics, particularly in the realms of Slovene and Albanian, and is noted for his work in advancing Slavic etymology in both scholarly and popular domains. He is a full fellow of the Slovenian Academy of Sciences and Arts.

== Career ==
Marko Snoj was born in Ljubljana. He attended Šentvid High School and studied comparative linguistics at the Department of Comparative Linguistics and Oriental Studies at the Faculty of Arts of the University of Ljubljana, completing his bachelor's degree in 1982 with a specialization in comparative linguistics and Hittitology. His 1984 master's thesis treated the problem of i- and u-coloration in the reflexes of Indo-European syllabic sonorants in Balto-Slavic.

Following his military service in 1985–86 (which he used for learning Albanian from his fellow conscripts), he worked on his doctoral dissertation on Proto-Slavic z from Indo-European s in Light of the Most Recent Accentological Discoveries, which he defended in 1989. His advisor was the Indo-Europeanist and academy member Bojan Čop; his doctoral committee also included the etymologist and academy member France Bezlaj and Indo-Iranian specialist Varja Cvetko Orešnik.

== Work on Slovene etymology ==
In 1981, he was invited by France Bezlaj to work on the project Etimološki slovar slovenskega jezika (Slovenian Etymological Dictionary). He contributed a considerable number of the entries, especially in the third (1995) and fourth volumes (2005), as well as most of the work for the final, fifth volume Kazala (Indices) (2007).

His work for the third volume was awarded the Gold Medal of the Scientific Research Institute of the Academy of Sciences.

In 1997, he published a popular etymological desk reference of Slovene, Slovenski etimološki slovar, which was later revised and expanded in 2003.

In appearances on radio and television, he has popularized etymology in Slovene. Especially noteworthy is his series of twenty-two one-hour programs on the national television station, TV Slovenija, Besede (Words), which has been rebroadcast several times since its first showing during the February–June 1998 season.

== Albanian studies ==
In the late 1980s, he continued his training in Albanian by attending summer courses at the University of Pristina. Later, he published Kratka albanska slovnica (A Short Grammar of Albanian) (Ljubljana 1991), Rückläufiges Wörterbuch der albanischen Sprache (Reverse Dictionary of Albanian) (Hamburg 1994), and an article on the history of Albanian studies research in Slovenia in the volume Studime II (Prishtina 1996).

Together with academy member Rexhep Ismajli, he prepared an annotated translation into Albanian of studies on Albanian by the renowned Slovene Slavic specialist Franz Miklosich entitled Gjurmime shqiptare/Albanische Forschungen (Albanian Studies; Prishtina 2007).

=== Contributions to Slavic accentology ===
From 1991 to 1992, under the auspices of a Humboldt Fellowship Snoj studied with the Indo-Europeanist Gert Klingenschmitt at the University of Regensburg, Germany, where he concentrated on problems of Balto-Slavic accentology. His articles on Slavic accentology take into account contemporary work on Indo-European laryngeal theory and the nature of Indo-European paradigms with regard to ablaut and the morphological distribution of word-level prosodic features.

== International activity ==
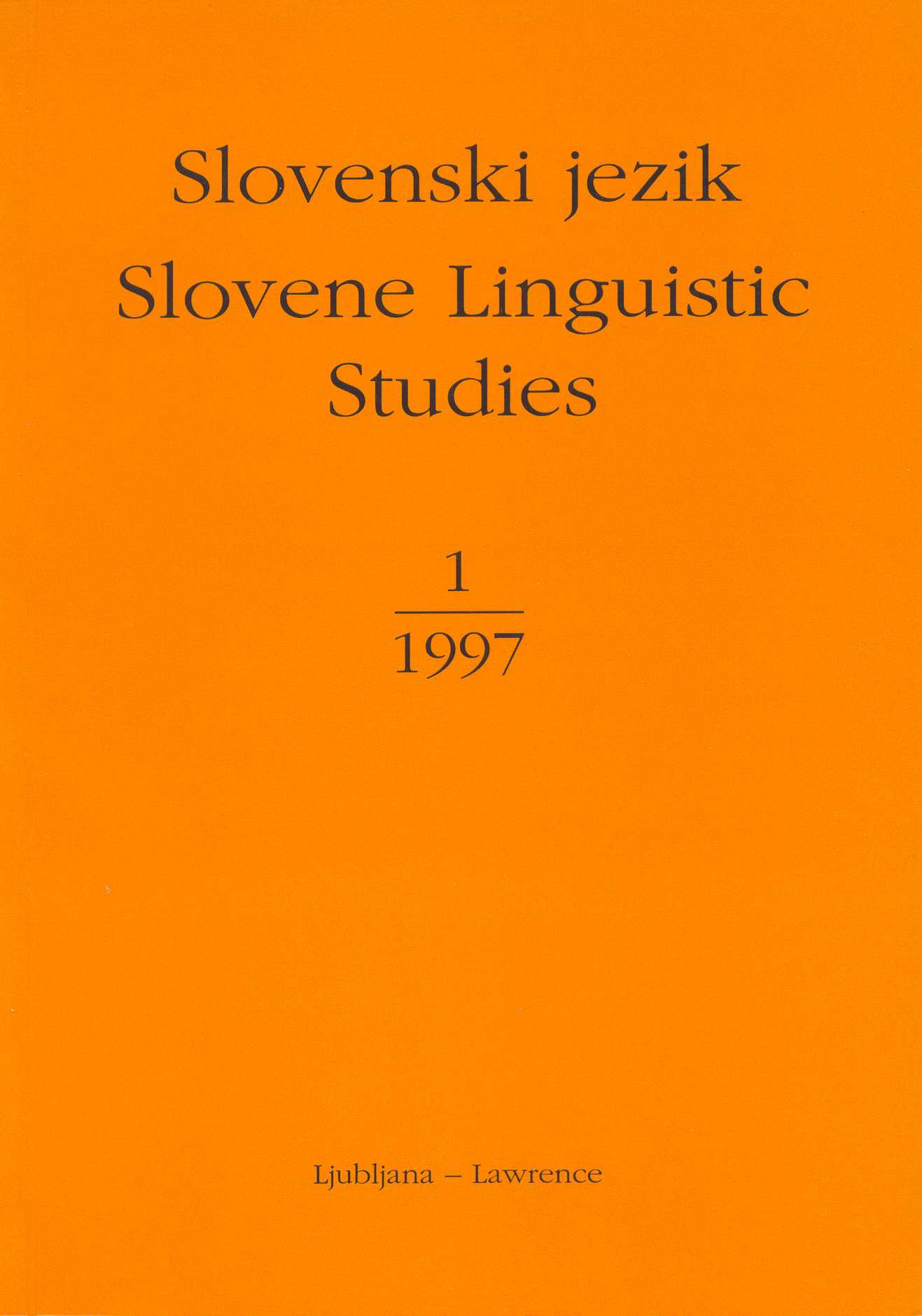
The first issue of Slovenski jezik/Slovene Linguistic Studies, 1997

Snoj has lectured and participated in conferences abroad, including Austria, Belarus, Canada, Croatia, Kosovo, Montenegro, Serbia, and the United States.

In 1994, he established the journal Slovenski jezik / Slovene Linguistic Studies with the American Slavic specialist Marc L. Greenberg.

== Selected bibliography ==
- 1976–2007. Bezlaj, France; Snoj, Marko; Furlan, Metka; Klemenčič, Simona. Etimološki slovar slovenskega jezika. Ljubljana: Mladinska knjiga. 5 vols. ISBN 86-11-14125-3. ISBN 961-6568-19-1. ISBN 978-961-254-016-6. COBISS 4728325
- 1991. Kratka albanska slovnica. Ljubljana: Filozofska fakulteta. 128 pp. COBISS 24439296
- 1994. Rückläufiges Wörterbuch der albanischen Sprache (Lexicographia Orientalis, Bd. 3). Hamburg: Buske. XI, 482 pp. ISBN 3-87548-081-3. COBISS 1966381
- 2002a. “Etimologija imen”, in Słowiańska onomastika, Encyklopedia, vol. 1. Edited by Ewa Rzetelska-Feleszko & Aleksandra Cieślikowa. Warsaw–Krakow: Towarzystwo Naukowe Warszawskie, pp. 152–4. COBISS 21003053
- 2002b. “Tuji vplivi: substrati, adstrati, superstrati”, in Słowiańska onomastika, Encyklopedia, vol. 1. Edited by Ewa Rzetelska-Feleszko & Aleksandra Cieślikowa. Warsaw–Krakow: Towarzystwo Naukowe Warszawskie, pp. 210–3. COBISS 21918765
- 2003. Slovenski etimološki slovar. 2., pregledana in dopolnjena izd. Ljubljana: Modrijan. XXVII, 1022 pp. ISBN 961-6465-37-6. COBISS 124973312
- 2004. “Zur Akzentuierung der urslawischen ter-Stämme”, in Per aspera ad asteriscos: studia indogermanica in honorem Jens Elmegård Rasmussen sexagenarii idibus Martiis anno MMIV. Edited by Adam Hyllested. (Innsbrucker Beiträge zur Sprachwissenschaft, vol. 112). Innsbruck: Institut für Sprachen und Literaturen der Universität, pp. 537–43. COBISS 23147821
- 2005a. “Etymology”, in Encyclopedia of Linguistics, vol. 1: A–L. Edited by Philipp Strazny. New York: Fitzroy Dearborn, pp. 304–6. COBISS 24665133
- 2005b. “Zur Bewahrung und weiteren Entwicklung einiger Fälle der urindogermanischen Akzentmobilität im Urslawischen”, in Indogermanica: Festschrift Gert Klingenschmitt: indische, iranische und indogermanische Studien dem verehrten Jubilar dargebracht zu seinem fünfundsechzigsten Geburtstag. Edited by Günter Schweiger. (Studien zur Iranistik und Indogermanistik, vol. 3). Taimering: Schweiger VWT, pp. 605–9. COBISS 26107181
- 2006. Slovar jezika Janeza Svetokriškega (Dela, 49/7; 49/8). Ljubljana: Založba ZRC. 2 vols., XVIII + 711; 710 pp. ISBN 961-6568-45-0. COBISS 227080704
- 2009. Etimološki slovar slovenskih zemljepisnih imen. Ljubljana : Modrijan : Založba ZRC. 603 pp. COBISS 247065344
- 2020. Slovar Pohlinovega jezika : na osnovi njegovih jezikoslovnih del. Ljubljana : Založba ZRC. 986 pp. COBISS 31361283
- 2023. Imena slovenskih psov Ljubljana : Založba ZRC. 336 pp. ISBN 978-961-05-0738-3. COBISS 162132483

== See also ==
- Pristina
