= Milko Kos =

Slovenian historian

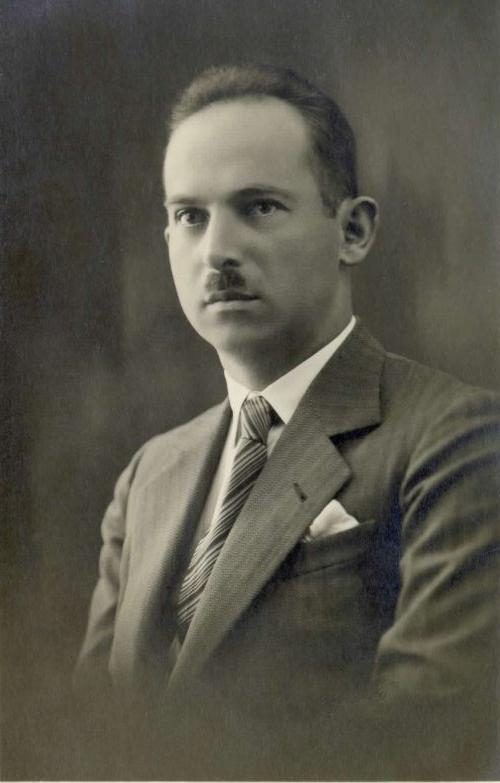
- Kos in the 1930s
- Born: 12 December 1892; Gorizia
- Died: 24 March 1972 (aged 79); Ljubljana

Milko Kos (12 December 1892 – 24 March 1972) was a Slovenian historian, considered the father of the Ljubljana school of historiography.

== Early life and education ==
He was born in the town of Gorizia (then part of Austro-Hungarian Empire, now in Italy), where his father, the renowned medievalist Franc Kos, taught at the state high school. His mother was a Friulian from Gorizia and Gradisca. His younger brother Anton Gojmir Kos later became a prominent painter.

He studied history at the University of Vienna, specializing in the social history of the Middle Ages. He was an expert on medieval settlement patterns in the Slovene Lands. He also wrote about the social history of medieval towns and issues related to early Slovenian history, including the Slavic principality of Carantania and the Freising manuscripts.

== Career ==
In 1928, he started teaching at the University of Ljubljana, where he replaced Ljudmil Hauptmann as the head of the chair for Slovene history. In this position, he influenced almost all Slovenian historians of the post–World War II period; most of them graduated under his direct supervision, including Fran Zwitter and Bogo Grafenauer.

Between 1941 and 1945, Kos served as the chancellor of the University of Ljubljana. During the difficult period of Italian and Nazi German annexation of Slovenia, Kos maintained an underground connection with the Liberation Front of the Slovenian People.

After the war, he became a member of the Slovenian Academy of Sciences and Arts. In 1955, he received the Prešeren Award, the highest recognition for cultural achievements in Slovenia, for his work on the land registers in the Slovenian Littoral.

== Death and legacy ==
He died in Ljubljana.

The Milko Kos Historical Institute of Ljubljana is named after him.
