= Reinhart Ceulemans =

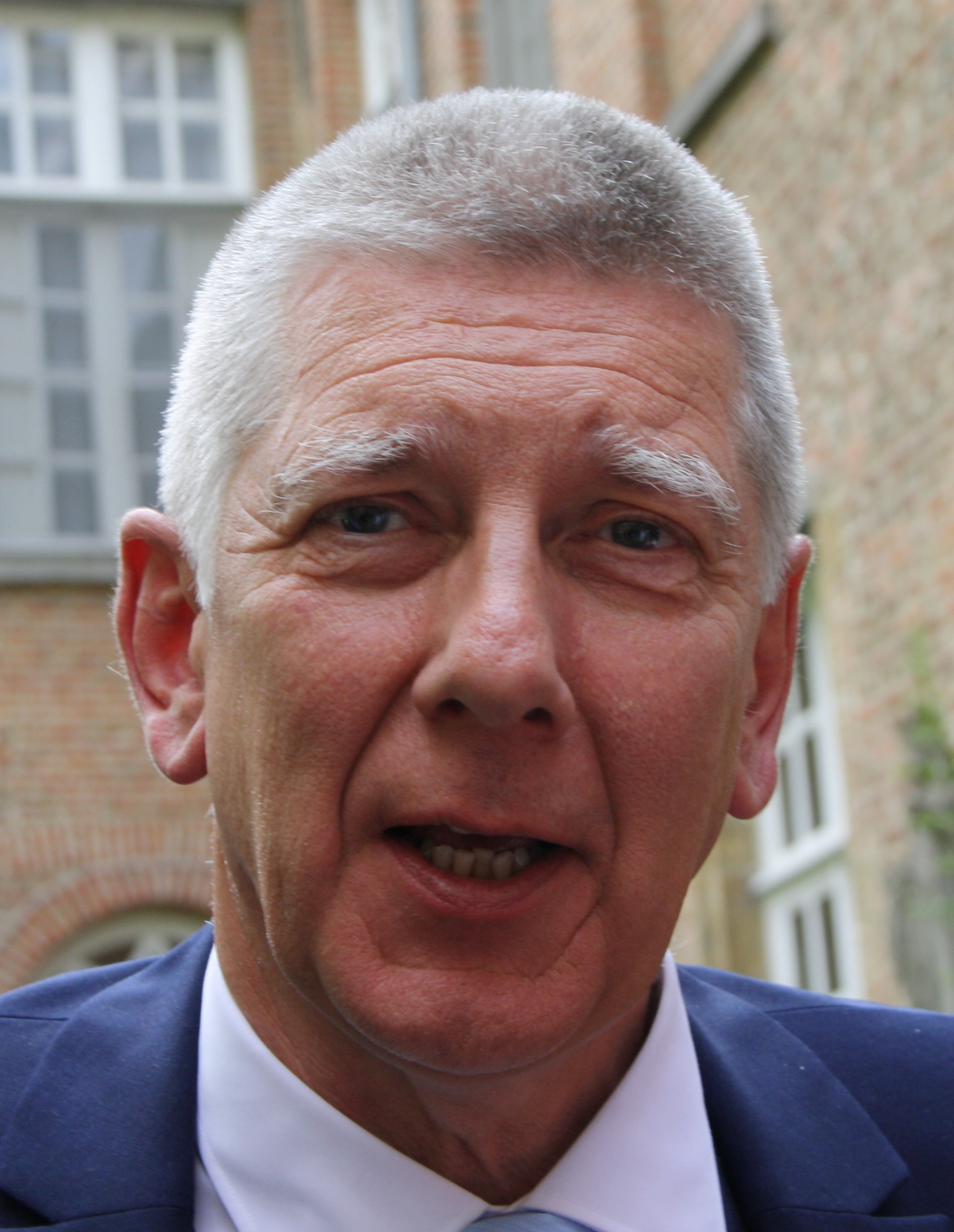
- Born: January 15, 1954 (age 72); Wilrijk, Antwerp, Belgium
- Education: University of Antwerp
- Known for: Tree responses to CO2, biosphere–atmosphere carbon fluxes, bioenergy plantations
- Awards: IUFRO Scientific Achievement Award (1990); Francqui Chair (2006–2007)
- Scientific career
- Fields: Ecology
- Workplaces: University of Antwerp
- Website: www.uantwerpen.be/en/staff/reinhart-ceulemans/personal-website/

Reinhart Jan Maria Ceulemans (born 15 January 1954, Wilrijk/Antwerp, Belgium) is a Belgian ecologist and emeritus professor at the University of Antwerp, where he directed the Research Center of Excellence PLECO. He has served, among others, as vice-dean of the Faculty of Sciences and has held visiting professorships at the University of Washington, Université Paris-Sud, University of Ghent, and University of Antwerp. Since retiring in 2019, he has been an emeritus professor at the University of Antwerp, a researcher at CzechGlobe in Brno, and a consultant to the Slovenian Forestry Institute. He is best known for his work on tree and plantation responses to elevated atmospheric carbon dioxide, biosphere–atmosphere carbon fluxes, and the development and assessment of short-rotation coppice (poplar and willow) systems for bioenergy.

== Early life and education ==
Ceulemans studied biology at the University of Antwerp, where he obtained his B.Sc. (1975), M.Sc. (1977), and Ph.D. in Sciences (Botany) in 1980. His doctoral dissertation investigated genetic variation in productivity determinants in poplar. He later obtained a Higher Education Teaching Degree (Habilitation) in 1990.

== Academic career ==
From 2000 to 2019 Ceulemans led the Research Group of Plant and Vegetation Ecology (PLECO, Department of Biology, University of Antwerp). In 2007 the research group was recognized as a Research Center of Excellence at the University of Antwerp. As the director of the Research Center, he also became the Methusalem titular with long-term funding from the Flemish Government through the University of Antwerp (2007-2019). He was chairman of the Department of Biology (2004-2006), vice dean of the Faculty of Sciences (2006-2009) and chair of various international evaluation and selection committees, including the European Science Foundation (ESF). Under his supervision a total of 28 PhD's were defended.

He has held visiting professorships at the University of Washington (Seattle, 1987–1988), Université Paris-Sud/Paris XI (Orsay, 1989) and at Ghent University, among others.

== Research ==
=== Responses to elevated CO2 and FACE experiments ===
He played a major role in European open-air CO2 enrichment experiments (including POPFACE and EUROFACE) and related research quantifying the growth responses and acclimation of temperate tree species to elevated CO2. These studies contributed to understanding how nitrogen uptake and other processes mediate forest productivity responses to rising atmospheric CO2 concentrations.

=== Bioenergy plantations and POPFULL ===
A central thread of his later career was the development and system-level assessment of poplar and willow short-rotation coppice (SRC) systems for bioenergy. Ceulemans led the ERC Advanced Grant project POPFULL (System analysis of a bio-energy plantation: full greenhouse gas balance and energy accounting), which implemented a large operational SRC plantation and performed full greenhouse-gas balances and life-cycle assessments to evaluate the climate mitigation potential of woody bioenergy at plantation scale. The POPFULL work and related publications (including multi-author studies on energy performance and soil carbon) have been highlighted by the ERC and related project pages.

=== Biosphere–atmosphere fluxes and ICOS ===
From the late 1990s Ceulemans’ group participated in European carbon-flux research networks (including CARBO-EUROPE) and in national coordination of greenhouse-gas observation infrastructure. From 2013 to 2019 he coordinated Belgium’s participation in the Integrated Carbon Observation System (ICOS) research infrastructure and served as a Belgian focal point for ICOS, helping to manage a national network of monitoring stations.

== Awards and honors ==
- In 1990, he received the Scientific Achievement Award of the International Union of Forest Research Organizations (IUFRO).
- During the academic year 2006-2007 he was titular of the Belgian Francqui Chair at the Université Catholique de Louvain (UCL). As a Francqui Chair he taught various courses and classes on forest ecophysiology, the ecology and genetics of poplar, plant ecology and related.
- He was elected a member of the Royal Flemish Academy of Belgium for Science and the Arts (since 2009)
- On 27 April 2010, he received the academic title of Doctor Honoris Causa at Mendel University of Brno (Czech Republic) from the Faculty of Forestry and Wood Sciences. Two years later – on 15 March 2012 – he became Doctor Honoris Causa at the Université d’Orléans, France.
- In 2015, he was elected a corresponding member of the Slovenian Academy of Sciences and Arts (since 2015)
- Ranked in ScholarGPS “2024 Highly Ranked Scholar – Lifetime” lists for Bioenergy.

== Publications and output ==
By 2019, Ceulemans was the author or co-author of over 345 publications in peer-reviewed scientific journals, as well as the (co-)editor of nine books on plant responses to environmental factors and tree physiology. He also co-authored over 50 publications in scientific volumes, proceedings and popularizing journals. His publications have been cited over 30 000 times and he has an H-index of 83 on Google Scholar.

== Selected publications ==
- Ceulemans R.; M. Mousseau (1994). "Tansley Review. Effects of elevated atmospheric CO_{2} on woody plants". New Phytologist. 127: 425–446. doi:10.1111/J.1469-8137.1994.TB03961.X.

Invited Tansley review, providing a comprehensive review of the major physiological responses of trees to elevated CO_{2}. This enabled the development of process-based models for the prediction of global change effects on forest ecosystems. It has been cited more than 600 times.

- Norby R.J.; S.D. Wullschleger; C.A. Gunderson; D.W. Johnson; R. Ceulemans (1999). "Tree responses to rising CO_{2} in field experiments: implications for the future forest". Plant, Cell and Environment. 22 (6): 683–714. Bibcode:1999PCEnv..22..683N. doi:10.1046/J.1365-3040.1999.00391.X.

This work showed that trees can profit from atmospheric CO_{2} concentrations with a mean biomass stimulation of 30%, despite the variability between experiments and species. The authors also gave proof of the fact that acclimation counteracts and mitigates most of this stimulation. It has been cited more than 400 times.

- Valentini R.; G. Matteucci; A.J. Dolman; E.D. Schulze; C. Rebmann; E.J. Moors; A. Granier; P. Gross; N.O. Jensen; K. Pilegaard; A. Lindroth; A. Grelle; C. Bernhofer; T. Grunwald; M. Aubinet; R. Ceulemans; A.S. Kowalski; T. Vesala; U. Rannik; P. Berbigier; D. Loustau; J. Guomundsson; H. Thorgeirsson; A. Ibrom; K. Morgenstern; R. Clement; J. Moncrieff; L. Montagnani; S. Minerbi; P.G. Jarvis (2000). "Respiration as the main determinant of carbon balance in European forests". Nature. 404 (6780): 861–865. Bibcode:2000Natur.404..861V. doi:10.1038/35009084. PMID 10786790. S2CID 205005949.

This work summarizes the exchange fluxes of carbon between the terrestrial biosphere and the atmosphere for European forests. It has been cited more than 1100 times.

- Janssens I.A.; A. Freibauer; P. Ciais; P. Smith; G.-J. Nabuurs; G. Folberth; B. Schlamadinger; R.W.A. Huthes; R. Ceulemans; E.-D. Schulze; R. Valentini; A.J. Dolman (2003). "Europe's terrestrial biosphere absorbs 7 to 12% of European anthropogenic CO_{2} emissions". Science. 300 (5625): 1538–1542. Bibcode:2003Sci...300.1538J. doi:10.1126/SCIENCE.1083592. PMID 12764201. S2CID 45159989.

This work assessed the carbon sink in Europe's terrestrial biosphere; it was estimated at 135 to 205 teragram per year. This work has been cited over 500 times.

- Njakou Djomo S.; A. Ac. T. Zenone; T. De Groote; S. Bergante; G. Facciotto; H. Sixto; P. Ciria Ciria; J. Weger; R. Ceulemans (2015). "Energy performances of intensive and extensive short rotation cropping systems for woody biomass production in the EU". Renewable and Sustainable Energy Reviews. 41: 845–854. Bibcode:2015RSERv..41..845N. doi:10.1016/J.RSER.2014.08.058. hdl:10261/291634.

This study reviews the available literature on the energy and greenhouse gas balance of bioenergy production. It has been cited over 100 times.
