= Jože Trontelj =

Slovenian Physician, a Doctor of Neurosciences, and a bioethicist from (2008-2013)

Jože Trontelj (1939–2013) was a Slovenian physician, doctor of neurosciences, and bioethicist. From 2008 to 2013, he was the President of the Slovenian Academy of Sciences and Arts. He authored or co-authored over 150 papers in journals, over 30 book chapters and 3 books, mainly on electromyography and physiological basis of neurological disorders, and over 70 publications on bioethical issues.

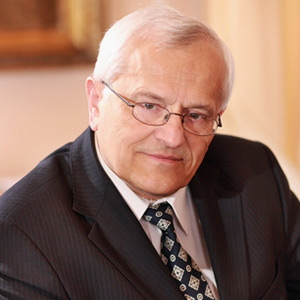
Dr. Jože Trontelj

== Medical career ==
Jože Trontelj was born in 1939 in Kamnik, Slovenia (then part of Yugoslavia). He graduated from the Medical Faculty of Ljubljana, Slovenia in 1964, specialised in neurology in 1973 and obtained a D.Sc. Degree in Neurological Sciences in 1972. He was installed as a Professor of Neurology at the Medical Faculty of Ljubljana in 1986.

Trontelj’s work in clinical neurophysiology focused on disorders of nerves and muscles. In the 1970s, he co-developed single fibre electromyography, a revolutionary method which is still part of the standard diagnostic armamentarium of all major medical centres. He introduced clinical neurophysiology during a number of visits in Kuwait (1978–1994).

Most of hiss research was in the physiology and disorders of neuromuscular transmission, spinal and brainstem reflexes, pain, and the criteria of brain death. He has received Yugoslavia's National Prize for Scientific Research, and an honorary title of an Ambassador of the Republic of Slovenia in Science.

== Work in bioethics ==
From 1995 to 2013, Trontelj chaired the National Medical Ethics Committee of Slovenia and served as the Slovenian delegate to the Steering Committee on Bioethics (CDBI) of the Council of Europe. As a member of the Working Party on biomedical research, he participated in the drafting of the Additional Protocol on Biomedical Research to the Oviedo Convention. For two consecutive terms he served as a member of the CDBI Bureau. In 2010, he was nominated to UNESCO's International Bioethics Committee.

In medical ethics, Dr. Trontelj's main interests were biomedical research on human beings, informed consent to medical interventions and research, brain death, organ donation, ethical questions in immunisation, artificial procreation, non-academic medical practices, vegetative state and states of minimal responsiveness, and end of life decisions. He also contributed to drafting of Slovenian laws on organ transplantation, biomedically-assisted reproduction, gene technology, mental health and patient's rights.

== Other work ==
Trontelj was active in acivil initiative in the early seventies to preserve two valleys in Slovenia threatened by hydroelectric projects. As a member of the Prime Minister's Strategic Council for Culture, Education and Research in 2004–2008, and a subsequent President's Group on the Strategies of Future Developments of Slovenia in 2009, he contributed to ethical aspects of planning for Slovenia's future. He also served as a member of the National Health Council (1996–2000), Chairman of the Medical Research Council (1996–1998), and Senior Advisor to the Minister of Health.

In 1991 he was elected Member of the Slovenian Academy of Sciences and Arts. He became the Academy's Vice-president in 1998 and President in 2008, a post he held until his death in 2013.

In 2013, he co-founded the Institute for Ethics, which was renamed the Jože Trontelj Institute for Ethics and Values in his honour following his death.
