= St. Margareten im Rosental =

St. Margareten im Rosental Šmarjeta v Rožu
- Municipality
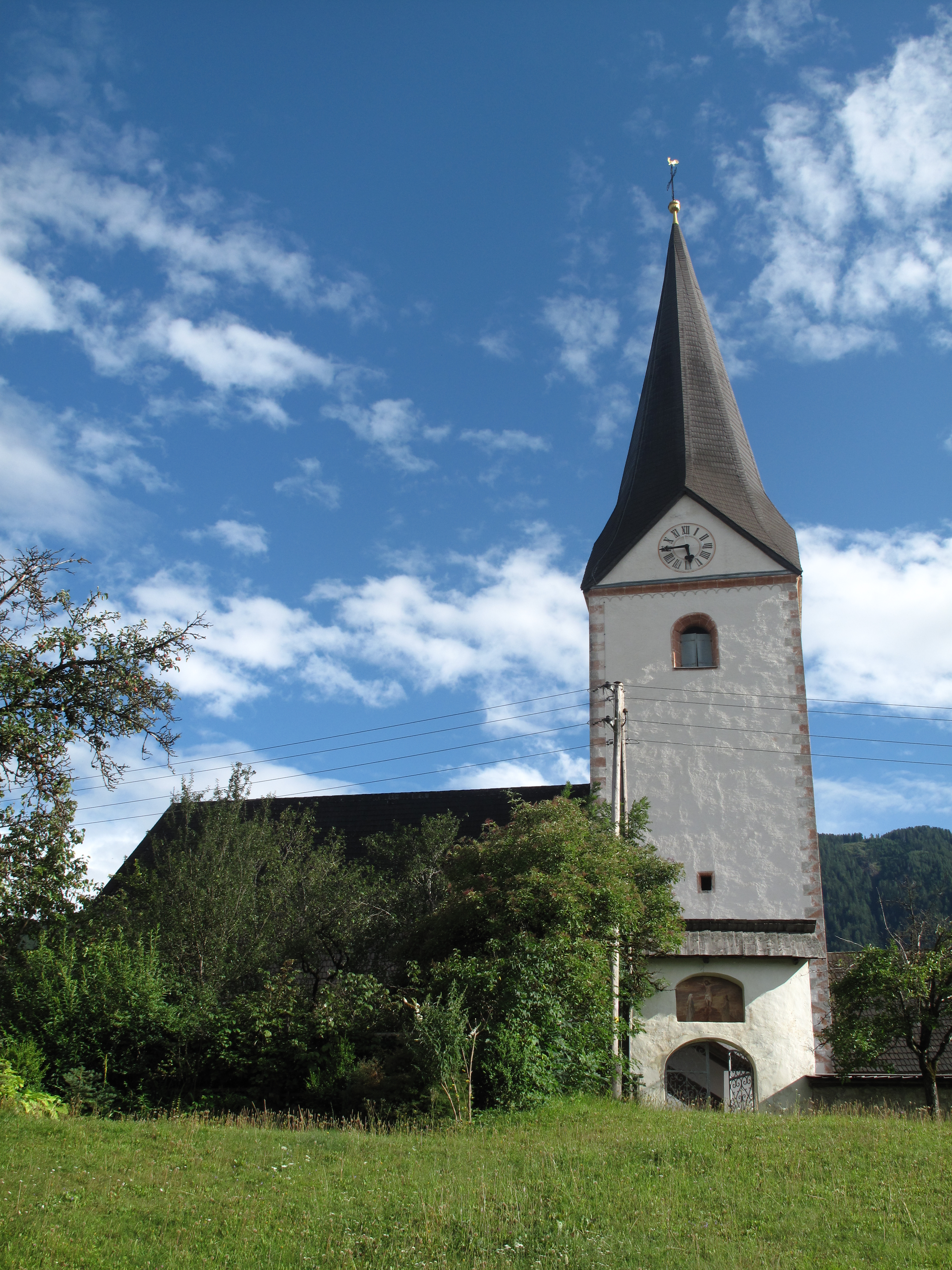

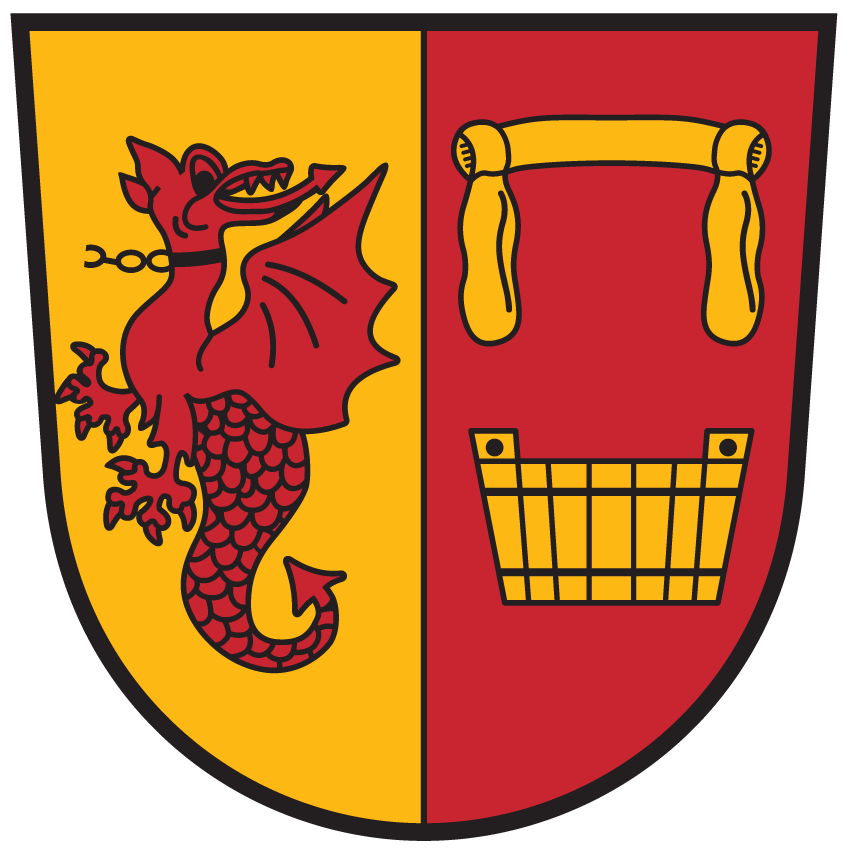
- Coat of arms

- Location within Austria
- Coordinates: 46°33′N 14°25′E
- Country: Austria
- State: Carinthia
- District: Klagenfurt-Land

Government
  - Mayor: Lukas Wolte

Area
  - Total: 43.99 km^{2} (16.98 sq mi)
- Elevation: 607 m (1,991 ft)

Population (2018-01-01)
  - Total: 1,099
  - Density: 24.98/km^{2} (64.71/sq mi)
- Time zone: UTC+1 (CET)
  - Summer (DST): UTC+2 (CEST)
- Postal code: 9173
- Area code: 04226
- Website: www.st-margareten.at

St. Margareten im Rosental (Slovene: Šmarjeta v Rožu) is a town in the district of Klagenfurt-Land in the Austrian state of Carinthia.

== Geography ==
The municipality lies in the southeast Rosental at the foot of the Hochobir. On the north, the Drau forms the municipal boundary, on the east the Freibach, and on the south and the west tributaries of the Karawank and the Inzegraben.

== Population ==
According to the 2001 census 11,8% of the population are Carinthian Slovenes.

Village	Number of people 1991	Percent of Slovenes 1991	Percent of Slovenes 1951
Trieblach/Treblje	92	35,3%	56,2%
Gupf/Vrh	85	15,3%	85,1%
Niederdörfl/Doljna vas	184	19,6%	84,9%
St.Margarethen/Šmarjeta	274	16,1%	59,6%
Homölisch/Hmelše	9	33,3%	98,1%
Gotschuchen/Kočuha	221	15,4%	79,1%
Sabosach/Zavoze	47	25,5%	55,2%
Seel/Selo	30	33,3%	50,0%
Dobrowa/Dobrava	33	21,2%	91,5%
Hintergupf/Zavrh	34	19,4%	100%
Dullach/Dole	56	5,4%	95,1%
Oberdörfl/Gornja vas	88	5,0%	23,2%

== Notable people ==
- Karl Matthäus Woschitz (b. 1937), theologian and bible scholar

== District Klagenfurt Land ==
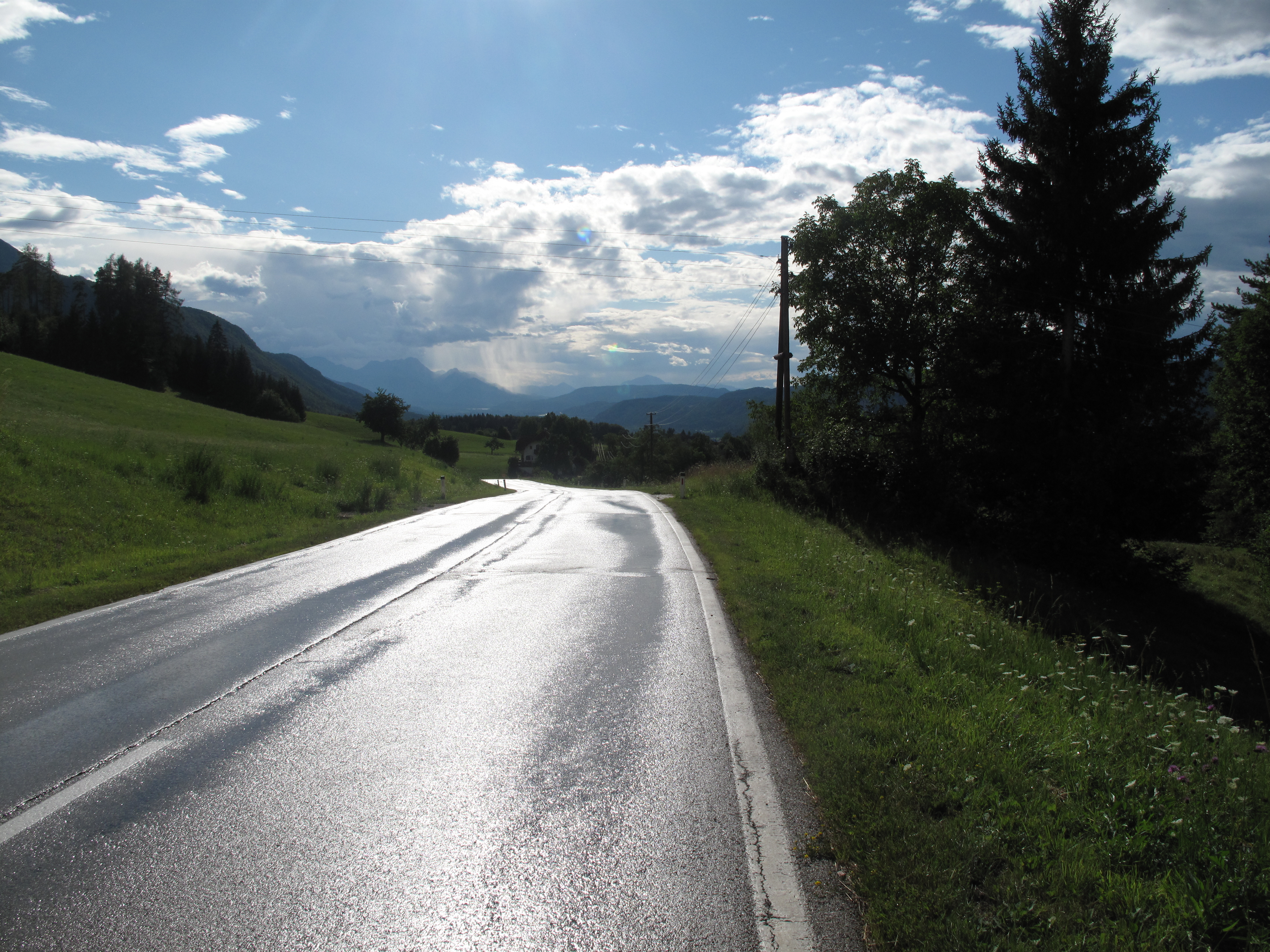
Between Sankt Margarethen and Oberdörfl, road panorama

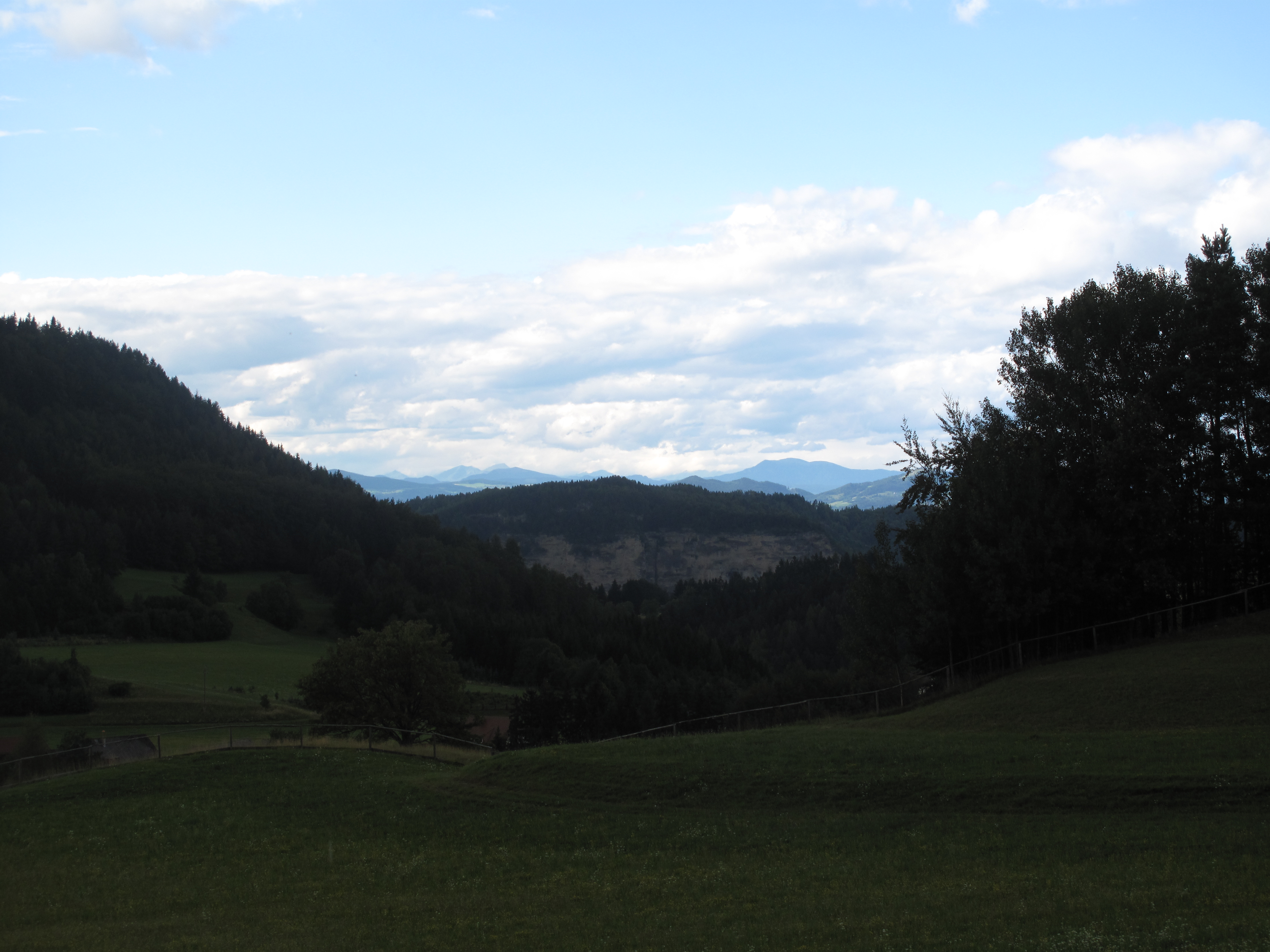
Between Oberdörfl and Abtei, panorama
