= Aleksander Bajt =

Slovenian economist (1921–2000)

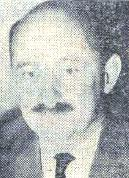
- Born: February 27, 1921; Ljubljana, Kingdom of Serbs, Croats and Slovenes
- Died: February 24, 2000 (aged 78)
- Occupations: Chetnik intelligence officer; jurist; economist
- Known for: Chetnik intelligence officer during WWII and influential post-war Yugoslav macroeconomist

Aleksander Bajt (February 27, 1921 – February 24, 2000) was a Chetnik intelligence officer during the World War II and a Yugoslav and Slovenian economist, best known as being the most influential macroeconomist in Socialist Yugoslavia.

== In Slovenia ==
Bajt was one of economists consulted to design model for privatization of socially owned companies in post-socialist Slovenia.

Bajt was a member of the Slovenian Academy of Art and Science.

== Bajt's memoires ==
In 1999, he published his memoirs, titled Berman's dossier (Slovene: Bermanov dosije) in which he surprised the Slovenian public when he revealed his pro-Chetnik and pro-western activities during World War II.

== Sources ==
- Wagener, Hans-Jurgen (12 February 1998). Economic Thought in Communist and Post-Communist Europe. Routledge. ISBN 978-1-134-68184-6.
