= France Bezlaj =

Slovenian linguist

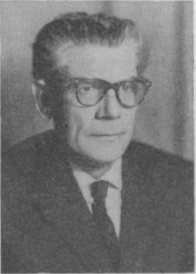
- Born: September 19, 1910; Litija
- Died: April 27, 1993 (aged 82); Ljubljana
- Occupations: Scholar of Slavic languages (Slavistics), etymologist, lexicographer, and onomastician

France Bezlaj (September 19, 1910 – April 27, 1993) was a Slovenian linguist.

He was born in Litija. He received a degree in Slavic studies at the Faculty of Arts in Ljubljana and Prague, and a PhD in 1939 with a dissertation on Slovene phonetics titles Oris slovenskega knjižnega izgovora (A Description of Standard Slovene Pronunciation). From 1958 to 1980 he worked as a professor of comparative Slavic linguistics at the Faculty of Arts in Ljubljana. In 1964 he became a regular member of the Slovene Academy of Sciences and Arts. He was the founder and editor of the journal Onomastica Jugoslavica (1969–1991). After specializing in phonetics during his studies in Prague, he later devoted himself to onomastics and etymology.

Bezlaj published the founding work of Slovene onomastics Slovenska vodna imena (Slovenian Hydronyms; vol. 1 in 1956, volume 2 in 1961). His lifetime achievement is Etimološki slovar slovenskega jezika (Slovene Etymological Dictionary, 4 vols., 1976–2005), which was supplemented and edited after his death by Marko Snoj and Metka Furlan. He discovered numerous parallels in various areas of Slavic territory by studying lexical elements in Slovene and Serbo-Croatian, pointing out traces of various linguistically heterogeneous strata reflecting older and younger Proto-Slavic migrations waves. He also worked on issues in standard Slovene.

He died in Ljubljana.

His lifetime opus includes 260 bibliographic units, in addition to scientific discussions and articles, seven books and several study manuals.
