= Savin Sever =

Slovene architect (1927–2003)

Savin Sever (27 June 1927, in Krško – 12 April 2003, in Ljubljana) was a Slovene architect. He was the son of a lawyer from the Littoral temporarily working in Krško, but he grew up in Maribor and Ljubljana.

Sever is considered one of the most typical representatives of the Ljubljana school of architecture. His work represents a synthesis of the tradition of Jože Plečnik and the influence of Edvard Ravnikar, whom he studied under. Sever is considered one of the most important Slovenian architects after the Second World War.

His best-known works include the Mladinska Knjiga printing office, the Astra department store, the Slovenian Automobile Association (AMZS) pavilion, the Merkur store, the Poljane parking garage, the portal to the Karawanken Tunnel, and the Triplex parking garage. The Triplex A parking garage (Garažna hiša Triplex A) was designed in 1966 with rounded corners, and the Triplex B parking garage (Garažna hiša Triplex B) in 1970 with angular corners.

Sever was a member of the Slovenian Academy of Sciences and Arts.

Sever is buried in the Vič Cemetery in Ljubljana.

== Awards ==
The awards that Sever received during his lifetime include:

- The Prešeren Fund Award, 1967, for the Mladinska Knjiga printing office in Ljubljana,
- The Prešeren Award, 1971, for a decade of significant architectural creation
- The Plečnik Medal, 1985, for the SOČA printing office in Nova Gorica; 2003, for significant contributions to the development of Slovenian architecture
- The Plečnik Prize, 1991, for designing the portal to the Karawanken Tunnel
