= Gunnar Svane =

Danish linguist (1927–2012)

- Born: 25 September 1927; Copenhagen, Denmark
- Died: 22 June 2012 (aged 84)
- Occupation: Philologist

Gunnar Olaf Svane (25 September 1927 - 22 June 2012) was a distinguished Danish linguist, professor, and scholar specializing in Albanology and Slavic studies. His academic career was primarily associated with Aarhus University in Denmark, where he served as a professor of Slavic studies from 1965 until his retirement in 1994. Svane's expertise extended to medieval Slavic languages and South Slavic languages, but he is particularly renowned for his research on Slavic loanwords in the Albanian language.

== Career and contribution ==
Svane's significant contributions to Albanology include his book *"Slavische Lehnwörter im Albanischen"* (Slavic Loanwords in Albanian), published in Aarhus in 1992, which provided an in-depth analysis of the influence of Slavic languages on Albanian. This work is considered a crucial resource in understanding the linguistic interactions between Slavic and Albanian speakers.

In addition to his studies on Slavic loanwords, Svane dedicated considerable effort to the works of Pjetër Budi, a significant figure in Albanian literature and history.

Svane's work on Budi involved transliterations and the creation of concordances, which were vital for modern scholars studying early Albanian literature. His dedication to this area of research has had a lasting impact on the field of Albanology.

Throughout his career, Svane was recognized for his contributions to linguistics and was an external member of both the Academy of Sciences and Arts of Kosovo, the Academy of Sciences of Albania and Slovenian Academy of Sciences and Arts. His scholarly legacy continues to influence the study of Slavic and Albanian languages.

== Publications ==
- "How to read Budi's "Speculum Confessionis", 1980-81 (Si të lexojmë veprën e Budit Speculum Confessionis) Studia Albanica, Tirana, 2021.
- "Pjetër Budi, Rituale romanum 1621, Konkordanca 1-2" (Pjetër Budi, Rituale romanum 1621), Concordance 1–2, 1982;
- "Pjetër Budi, Dottrina Christiana 1618 me një tejshkrim në drejtshkrimin modern dhe konkordancë" (Pjetër Budi, Dottrina Christiana 1618, with a transcription into modern orthography and a concordance), 1985;
- "Dottrina Christiana 1618, Konkordencë 1-2" (Dottrina Christiana 1618, Concordence 1-2), 1985;
- "Albanian Manuscripts from the 18th century in the Royal Library of Copenhagen" (Dorëshkrime shqipe to shek. 18 në Bibliotekën Mbretërore to Kopenhagës) Studime filologjike, 1986, 4; Tirana
- "Pjetër Budi, Speculum Confessionis 1621, me një tejshkrim në drejtshkrimin modern dhe konkordancë" (Pjetër Budi, Speculum Confessionis 1621, with a transcription into modern orthography and a concordance), 1986;
- "Pjetër Budi, Speculum Confessionis 1621, Konkordancë 1-4" (Pjetër Budi, Speculum Confessionis 1621, Concordence 1-4), 1986.
- "Slavische Lehnwörter im Albanischen", Acta Jutlandica LXVIII, (Humanistische Reihe 67.), Aarhus 1992
