= Zoran Bujas =

Croatian psychologist (1910–2004)

Zoran Bujas (27 December 1910 – 11 January 2004) was a Croatian psychologist.

== Biography ==
Bujas was born in Split and spent his childhood in Zadar and Dubrovnik, where he graduated from high school in 1928. He graduated psychology from the University of Zagreb in 1932, where he obtained his Ph.D. in 1933. Bujas continued his studies at the University of Paris from 1933 to 1936, taking part in research at the Laboratory for the Psychophysiology of Senses, headed by Henri Piéron. From 1938 until his retirement in 1981 he was professor of experimental and physiological psychology at the University of Zagreb.

Bujas was a dean of the Faculty of Philosophy in 1955/56 and a rector of the University of Zagreb in 1956/57 and 1957/58. In 1968 he became the first and the only psychologist to become a full member of the Yugoslav Academy of Sciences and Arts (now Croatian Academy of Sciences and Arts). From 1989 to 1991 he served as a vice-president of the academy. Since 1985, Bujas was also a corresponding member of the Slovenian Academy of Sciences and Arts. He was named professor emeritus of the University of Zagreb in 2000.

His fields of research interest were sensory psychophysiology, psychometrics, and work psychophysiology, particularly methodological problems and approaches in investigation.

Bujas was a pioneer of psychological testing; his "Series Z" test (Croatian: Serija Z), co-authored with Ramiro Bujas in 1937, was the first Croatian intelligence test.

Academic offices
Preceded by Hrvoje Iveković	Rector of the University of Zagreb; 1956–1958	Succeeded by Marijan Horvat
