= Franc Gubenšek =

Franc Gubenšek (31 October 1937 – 17 August 2010) was a Slovene biochemist and academic, notable for his work on toxins in snake venom. Gubenšek's research focused on neurotoxic phospholipases. With his colleagues at the Jožef Stefan Institute, he was one of the first Slovene scientists to determine primary structure of those proteins, later focusing on their receptors and developing a hypothesis about the mechanism of their activity. In later years, he studied the molecular evolution of snake venom toxins. He co-discovered a novel mobile element of DNA and demonstrated horizontal gene transfer of this element between snakes and ruminants in evolutionary history which attracted significant attention of the scientific community.

Apart from his scientific work, Gubenšek chaired the biochemistry department at the Faculty of Chemistry and Chemical Technology (University of Ljubljana), organized several scientific conferences and served in the editorial boards of the journals Acta Chimica Slovenica and Toxicon. He was elected as a member of the European Molecular Biology Organization as the first scientist from Slovenia, and a member of the Slovenian Academy of Sciences and Arts.
