= Contextual searching =

Contextual search is a form of optimizing web-based search results based on context provided by the user and the computer being used to enter the query. Contextual search services differ from current search engines based on traditional information retrieval that return lists of documents based on their relevance to the query. Rather, contextual search attempts to increase the precision of results based on how valuable they are to individual users.

== Basic contextual search ==
The basic form of contextual search is the process of scanning the full-text of a query in order to understand what the user needs. Web search engines scan HTML pages for content and return an index rating based on how relevant the content is to the entered query. HTML pages that have a higher occurrence of query keywords within their content are not rated higher. Users have limited control over the context of their query based on the words they use to search with. For example, users looking for the menu portion of a website can add "menu" to the end of their query to provide the search engine with context of what they need. The next step in contextualizing search is for the search service itself to request information that narrows down the results, such as Google asking for a time range to search within.

== Explicitly supplied context ==
Certain search services, including many Meta search engines, request individual contextual information from users to increase the precision of returned documents. Inquirus 2 is a Meta search engine that acts as a mediator between the user query and other search engines. When searching on Inquirus 2, users enter a query and specify constraints such as the information need category, maximum number of hits, and display formats. For example, a user looking for research papers can specify documents with "references" or "abstracts" to be rated higher. If another user is searching for general information on the topic rather than research papers, they can specify the GenScore attribute to have a heavier weight.

Explicitly supplied context effectively increases the precision of results, however, these search services tend to suffer from poor user-experience. Learning the interface of programs like Inquirus can prove challenging for general users without knowledge of search metrics. Aspects of supplied context do appear on major search engines with better user-interaction such as Google and Bing. Google allows users to filter by type: Images, Maps, Shopping, News, Videos, Books, Flights, and Apps. Google has an extensive list of search operators that allow users to explicitly limit results to fit their needs such as restricting certain file types or removing certain words. Bing also uses a similar set of search operators to assist users in explicitly narrowing down the context of their queries. Bing allows users to search within a time range, by file type, by location, language, and more.

== Automatically inferred context ==
There are other systems being developed that are working on automatically inferring the context of user queries based on the content of other documents they view or edit. IBM's Watson Project aims to create a cognitive technology that dynamically learns as it processes user queries. When presented with a query Watson creates a hypothesis that is evaluated against its present bank of knowledge based on previous questions. As related terms and relevant documents are matched against the query, Watson's hypothesis is modified to reflect the new information provided through unstructured data based on information it has obtained in previous situations. Watson's ability to build off previous knowledge allows queries to be automatically filtered for similar contexts in order to supply precise results.

Major search services such as Google, Bing, and Yahoo also have a system of automatically inferring the context of particular user queries. Google tracks user's previous queries and selected results to further personalize results for those individuals. For example, if a user consistently searches for articles related to animals, wild animals, or animal care a search for "jaguar" would rank an article on jaguar cats higher than links to Jaguar Cars. Similar to Watson, search services strive to learn from users based on previous experiences to automatically provide context on current queries. Bing also provides automatic context for particular queries based on the content of the query itself. A search of "pizza" returns an interactive list of restaurants and their ratings based on the approximate location of the user's computer. The Bing server automatically infers that when a user searches for a food item, they are interested in documents within the context of purchasing that food item or finding restaurants that sell that particular item.

=== Contextual mobile search ===
The drive to develop better contextualized search coincides with the increasing popularity of using mobile phones to complete searches. BIA/Kelsey research marketing firm projected that by 2015 mobile local search would "exceed local search by more than 27 billion queries". Mobile phones provide the opportunity to provide search services with a broader supply of contextual information, particularly for location services but also personalized searches based on the wealth of information stored locally on the phone including contacts information, geometric analysis such as speed and elevation, and installed apps.
