= Stanko Grafenauer =

Slovenian mineralogist and academic

Stanko Grafenauer (13 May 1922 – 7 August 2010) was a Slovenian mining engineer, mineralogist and academic. He made significant contributions to the field of mineralogy and introduced new measurement techniques in his research. Grafenauer was also recognised for his work as a geologist and his involvement in academia. His main fields of research were: ultramafic rocks with chromite deposits, Triassic igneous rocks of Slovenia, and studying mineral deposits in the Balkans thought to be related to Triassic igneous activity. He was also involved in the study of Moon samples.

== Early life and education ==
Stanko Grafenauer was born in Ljubljana, then part of Yugoslavia. In 1941, he enrolled in his studies at the Faculty of Engineering in Ljubljana but was interrupted by the outbreak of World War II. During the war, he was interned in Gonars and Monigo. After the war, he resumed his education and graduated in 1948. After completing his doctoral studies, Grafenauer joined the Mežica mine in 1955, where he remained until 1961. During this time, he held the position of chief mining engineer and implemented innovative working methods. His work extended beyond day-to-day operations, as he also conducted systematic research into the formation and genesis of ore deposits. In order to enhance his expertise, Grafenauer pursued further education in the field. From 1957 to 1958, he expanded his knowledge of X-ray diffraction and ore microscopy through specialised training in Heidelberg. This additional training allowed him to deepen his understanding of these techniques and apply them effectively to his research.

== Career ==
After completing his degree, Grafenauer worked as a geologist in the mines of Mežica and Raduša (1949–1954). He also worked at the Geological Institute of Macedonia in Skopje. His professional endeavors focused on researching various minerals and implementing new measurement techniques in the field. In 1959, Grafenauer achieved habilitation. Subsequently, in 1961, he was appointed as an associate professor of ore deposit geology at the Faculty of Mining, Metallurgy, and Chemical Technology at the University of Ljubljana. In 1965, he became a full professor at its successor, the Faculty of Natural Sciences and Technology. In April 1973, he was elected as an associate member of the Slovenian Academy of Sciences and Arts. In April 1981, he became a full member of the academy. Throughout his career, he received several accolades, including the Boris Kidrič Foundation Award in 1972, which honoured his outstanding achievements. He was the first in Yugoslavia to use the electron microprobe and he found there a number of rare minerals, such as maucherite and mackinawite.

== Personal life ==
Beyond his professional accomplishments, Stanko Grafenauer displayed diverse interests. As a retiree, he authored a book featuring recipes for dishes prepared within his family. He had a daughter named Irena Grafenauer, who gained renown as a flutist. His father was linguist and historian, best known as historian of literature, Ivan Grafenauer, his sister was designer, architect and choreographer Marija Grafenauer-Vogelnik, and his brother was the historian Bogo Grafenauer.
