= Ferdinand Seidl =

Slovenian naturalist and geologist (1856-1942)

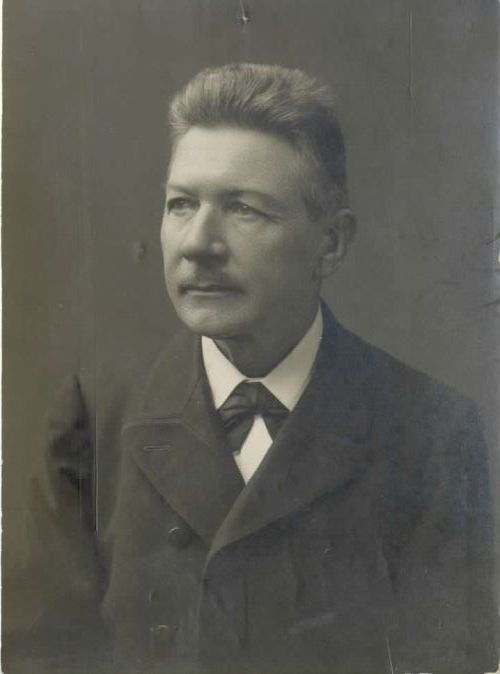
- Born: March 10, 1856; Novo Mesto, Duchy of Carniola, Austrian Empire
- Died: December 1, 1942 (aged 86); Novo Mesto, Province of Ljubljana, Kingdom of Italy
- Occupation(s): Naturalist, geographer, geologist, botanist

Ferdinand Seidl (March 10, 1856 – December 1, 1942) was a Slovenian naturalist and geologist.

Seidl is considered the founder of Slovenian geology and geological terminology.

His wide ranging interests encompassed geology, seismology, meteorology and botany but the 1895 Ljubljana earthquake led to a focus on seismology. He was the author of the first Slovenian popular book on geology.

He died in his native Novo Mesto, where a street bears his name (Seidlova ulica).
