= Miodrag Ibrovac =

Serbian and Yugoslav literary historian, novelist, academic

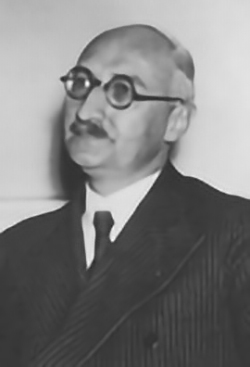
- Born: Миодраг Ибровац; August 24, 1885; Gornji Milanovac, Kingdom of Serbia
- Died: June 21, 1973 (aged 87); Belgrade, SFR Yugoslavia
- Occupation(s): Historian, writer, university professor

Miodrag Ibrovac (24 August 1885 in Gornji Milanovac – 21 June 1973 in Belgrade) was a Serbian and Yugoslav literary historian, novelist, academic and professor at the University of Belgrade.

== Biography ==
He graduated from college in 1907, and since 1911 has taught at the Belgrade lyceum. From 1924 to 1958, Ibrovac was a full professor at the Faculty of Philology of the University of Belgrade in the Department of French Language and Literature where he succeeded Bogdan Popović. He was a corresponding member of the Serbian Academy of Sciences and Arts in 1968 and a full professor in 1970. He was a member of the Serbian delegation at the Paris Peace Conference that brought an end to the Great War with the signing of the Treaty of Versailles in 1919. The delegation from Serbia consisted of Nikola Pašić, Slobodan Jovanović, Milenko Radomar Vesnić, Miodrag Ibrovac and others.

He is one of the founders of the Serbian PEN Center.

He was president of the Society for Cultural Co-operation Yugoslavia-France.

== Works ==
- Ivo Vojnovic et son poème dramatique "La Résurrection de Lazare", [Paris], 1917, extrait de Monde Slave, (N°5, 1917).
- Un poete de Raguse, 1918.
- La langue serbo-croate, Ligue des universitaires serbo-croato-slovènes, Paris, 1918.
- Jose-Maria de Heredia, sa vie, son oeuvre (1923)
- La poésie Yougoslave contemporaine, Revue Internationale des Etudes balkaniques, Belgrade, 1937
- Anthologie de la poésie Yougoslave des XIXe et XXe siècles, (introduction and notes by M. Ibrovac; in collaboration with Savka Ibrovac), Delagrave, Paris, 1935.
- Essai de Bibliographie française de la Littérature Yougoslave, with Pavle Popović, Librairie Félix Alcan, Paris, 1931.
- Les sources des "Trophées": thèse complémentaire pour le doctorat à la lettres présentée la Faculté des Lettres de l'Université de Paris, Les presses françaises, Paris, 1923 (prize of the French Academy).
- Kopitar i francuzi
- Bibliografski priručnik
