= Davorin Dolar =

Slovenian physical chemist (1921–2005)

- Born: 1 January 1921
- Died: 12 November 2005 (aged 84)
- Education: University of Ljubljana, University of Leningrad
- Known for: Research on thermodynamic and transport properties of polyelectrolytic solutions
- Scientific career
- Fields: Physical chemistry
- Institutions: University of Ljubljana

Davorin Dolar (1 January 1921 – 12 November 2005) was a Slovenian chemist at the University of Ljubljana. He was a physical chemist who studied polyelectrolyte solutions. He is regarded as a founder of modern physical chemistry teaching in Slovenia. He was a member of the Slovenian Academy of Sciences and Arts.

== Education and career ==
In 1939, Dolar began studying chemistry at the University of Ljubljana and then graduated in 1944. In 1947 he enrolled at the University of Leningrad and continued studying physical chemistry. In 1952 he became an assistant professor of physical chemistry in Ljubljana. In 1954 he moved to Brooklyn to work under Professor Gregor at the Polytechnic Institute. In 1957, after returning to Ljubljana, he obtained his PhD. He was appointed an associate professor in 1960, and a professor in 1965. In 1960, while working at the Chair in Physical Chemistry, he started doing research in thermodynamic and transport properties of polyelectrolytic solutions, eventually gaining notability in the field. In 1978 he became a full member of the Slovenian Academy of Sciences and Arts. He received the Boris Kidrič Award in 1979 and the Order of Slovenia in 1988. After retiring from Ljubljana in 1989, he was named a professor emeritus and received a golden plaque from the university in 1993. In 2004, he received the Zois Award for Lifetime Achievement.

== Personal life ==
When deciding what to study at the university, Dolar was torn between mathematics, physics, and chemistry. He ended up choosing chemistry because he wanted to stay near the mountains and there was a factory nearby in need of chemical engineers. Known in his prime as a master mountain climber and mountain rescuer, he continued to hike his entire life.

His father was Simon Dolar, a popular mathematics professor, who was responsible for inspiring Davorin's love of the sciences. From his retirement in 1989 to his death in 2005, Dolar remained highly active in the academic community, continuing to advise aspiring chemists until the end of his life.
