= Karl Matthäus Woschitz =

Austrian theologian and bible scholar (born 1937)

Karl Matthäus Woschitz (born September 19, 1937) is an Austrian theologian and bible scholar. He is professor emeritus of biblical theology and religious studies and was head of the institute of religious studies of the University of Graz from 1984 to 2005. Today he is rector of the Christ-König church in Klagenfurt.

Woschitz was born in Sankt Margareten im Rosental, and received his Matura at gymnasium Schloss Tanzenberg, Sankt Veit an der Glan, in 1955. He received his doctor's degree from University of Innsbruck, was ordained into the priesthood in Klagenfurt (1961), and promoted to professor at University of Graz Faculty of Catholic Theology. After 1971, he taught in Salzburg and Innsbruck and lectured at several universities in Austria and Germany.

From 1989 to 1991 he was Dean of the University of Graz faculty of theology. He was appointed prelate of honour by Pope John Paul II in 1995, awarded with the Austrian Cross of Honour for Science and Art, 1st class in 1996 and he has been Vice Dean of the European Academy of Sciences and Arts class VII - World Religions since 1994 as well as member of the Slovenian Academy of Sciences and Arts since 2001.
