= International Journal of Sociology and Social Policy =

Peer-reviewed academic journal

- Discipline: Sociology, social policy
- Language: English
- Edited by: Colin C. Williams

Publication details
- History: 1981–present
- Publisher: Emerald Group Publishing
- Frequency: Bimonthly

Standard abbreviations
- ISO 4: Int. J. Sociol. Soc. Policy

Indexing
- ISSN: 0144-333X
- LCCN: 82647107
- OCLC no.: 45317607

Links
- Journal homepage

The International Journal of Sociology and Social Policy is a peer-reviewed academic journal covering research in sociology and on social policy. The journal was established in 1981 and is published by Emerald Group Publishing. The editor-in-chief is Colin C. Williams (University of Sheffield).

== Abstracting and indexing ==
The journal is abstracted and indexed in:

- ABI/INFORM
- Educational Research Abstracts
- International Bibliography of the Social Sciences
- ProQuest
- Sociological Abstracts
- TOC Premier
