= Spodnja Polskava =

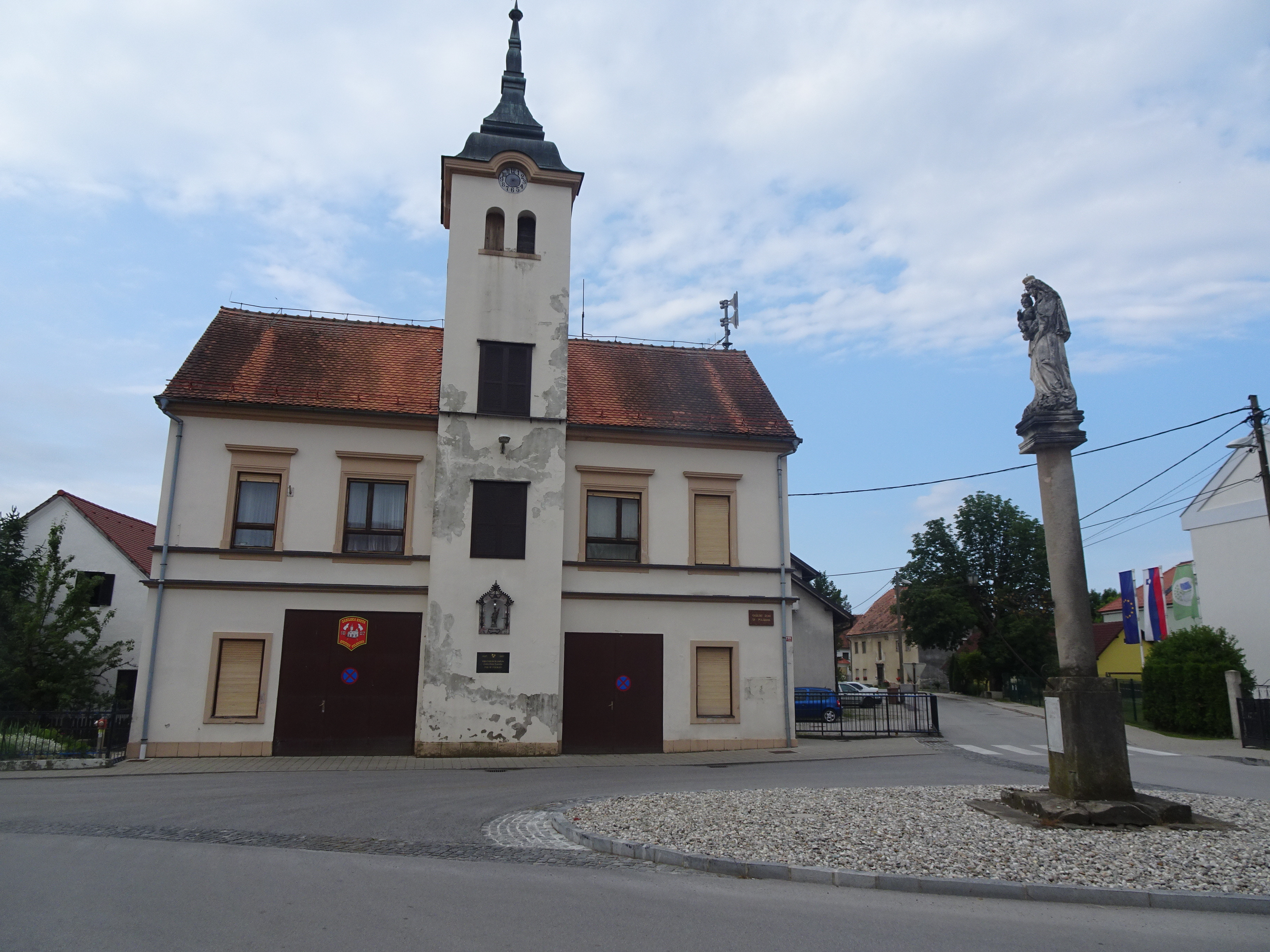
- Spodnja Polskava

- Location in Slovenia
- Coordinates: 46°24′51.05″N 15°38′2.03″E
- Country: Slovenia
- Traditional region: Styria
- Statistical region: Drava
- Municipality: Slovenska Bistrica

Area
  - Total: 8.54 km^{2} (3.30 sq mi)
- Elevation: 266 m (873 ft)

Population (2002)
  - Total: 814

Spodnja Polskava (pronounced [ˈspoːdnja pɔlˈskaːʋa]) is a settlement in the Municipality of Slovenska Bistrica in northeastern Slovenia. The area is part of the traditional region of Styria. It is now included with the rest of the municipality in the Drava Statistical Region.

The parish church in the settlement is dedicated to Saint Stephen and belongs to the Roman Catholic Archdiocese of Maribor. It was built in the 16th century and refurbished in the Baroque style in the early 17th century.
