= Jožef Stefan Institute =

Research institute in Ljubljana, Slovenia

Coordinates: 46°2′32.29″N 14°29′15.97″E

- The institute's symbol is the abbreviation IJS in the five-bit code ITA2 for punched tape.
- Established: 1949
- Chair: Leon Cizelj
- Staff: 1170 (2022)
- Address: Jamova ulica 39
- Location: Ljubljana, Slovenia
- Website: www.ijs.si

The Jožef Stefan Institute (JSI) (Slovene: Institut »Jožef Stefan«, IJS) is the largest research institute in Slovenia. The main research areas are physics, chemistry, molecular biology, biotechnology, information technologies, reactor physics, energy, and the environment. At the beginning of 2022, the institute had 1,170 employees, of whom 568 were PhD holders.

The mission of the Jožef Stefan Institute is the accumulation and dissemination of knowledge at the frontiers of natural science and technology for the benefit of society at large through the pursuit of education, learning, research, and development of high technology at the highest international levels of excellence.

== History ==
The institute was founded by the State Security Administration (Yugoslavia) in 1949 for atomic weapons research. Initially, the Vinča Nuclear Institute in Belgrade was established in 1948, followed by the Ruđer Bošković Institute in Zagreb in 1950 and the Jožef Stefan Institute as an institute for physics in the Slovenian Academy of Sciences and Arts. It is named after the distinguished 19th-century physicist Josef Stefan (Slovene: Jožef Stefan), best known for his work on the Stefan–Boltzmann law of black-body radiation.

The institute was named the Jožef Stefan Physics Institute in 1952. Soon after, it received a betatron, an electron microscope, and started operation of a Van de Graaff generator. It was rebranded the Jožef Stefan Nuclear Institute in 1959, and the word Nuclear was dropped in 1969. In 1992 the institute became public.

IJS is involved in a wide variety of fields of scientific and economic interest. After close to 60 years of scientific achievement, the institute has become part of the image of Slovenia.

Over the last 60 years it has created a number of important institutions, such as the University of Nova Gorica, the Jožef Stefan International Postgraduate School and the Ljubljana Technology park.

In November 2000, the physicist Boštjan Zalar succeeded the professor of robotics Jadran Lenarčič as the institute's head.

In 2021, the institute established the International Research Centre on Artificial Intelligence (IRCAI), which is supported by UNESCO.

In April 2025, Leon Cizelj, an expert in nuclear technology, succeeded the physicist Boštjan Zalar as the institute's head.

== Departments ==
- Physics
  - F1 Theoretical Physics
  - F2 Low and Medium Energy Physics
  - F3 Thin Films and Surfaces
  - F4 Surface Engineering and Optoelectronics
  - F5 Condensed Matter Physics
  - F7 Complex Matter
  - F8 Reactor Physics
- Chemistry and Biochemistry
  - B1 Biochemistry and Molecular Biology
  - B2 Molecular and Biomedical Sciences
  - B3 Biotechnology
  - K1 Inorganic Chemistry and Technology
  - K3 Physical and Organic Chemistry
  - K5 Electronic Ceramics
  - K6 Engineering Ceramics
  - K7 Nanostructured Materials
  - K8 Synthesis of Materials K8
  - K9 Advanced Materials
  - O2 Environmental Sciences
- Electronics and Information Technologies
  - E1 Automation, Biocybernetics and Robotics
  - E2 Systems and Control
  - E3 Artificial Intelligence
  - E5 Open Computer Systems and Networks
  - E6 Communication Systems
  - E7 Computer Systems
  - E8 Knowledge Technologies
  - E9 Intelligent Systems
- Reactor Engineering and Energetics
  - R4 Reactor Engineering
- Centers
  - Centre for Knowledge Transfer in Information Technologies
  - Networking Infrastructure Centre
  - Reactor Infrastructure Centre
  - Scientific Information Centre Library
  - Center for Technology Transfer and Innovation

== Campuses ==
The institute has facilities in two locations. The main facilities and the headquarters are at Jamova 39 in Ljubljana, and the other location is the institute's Podgorica Reactor Center located in Brinje near Ljubljana.

== Research reactor ==
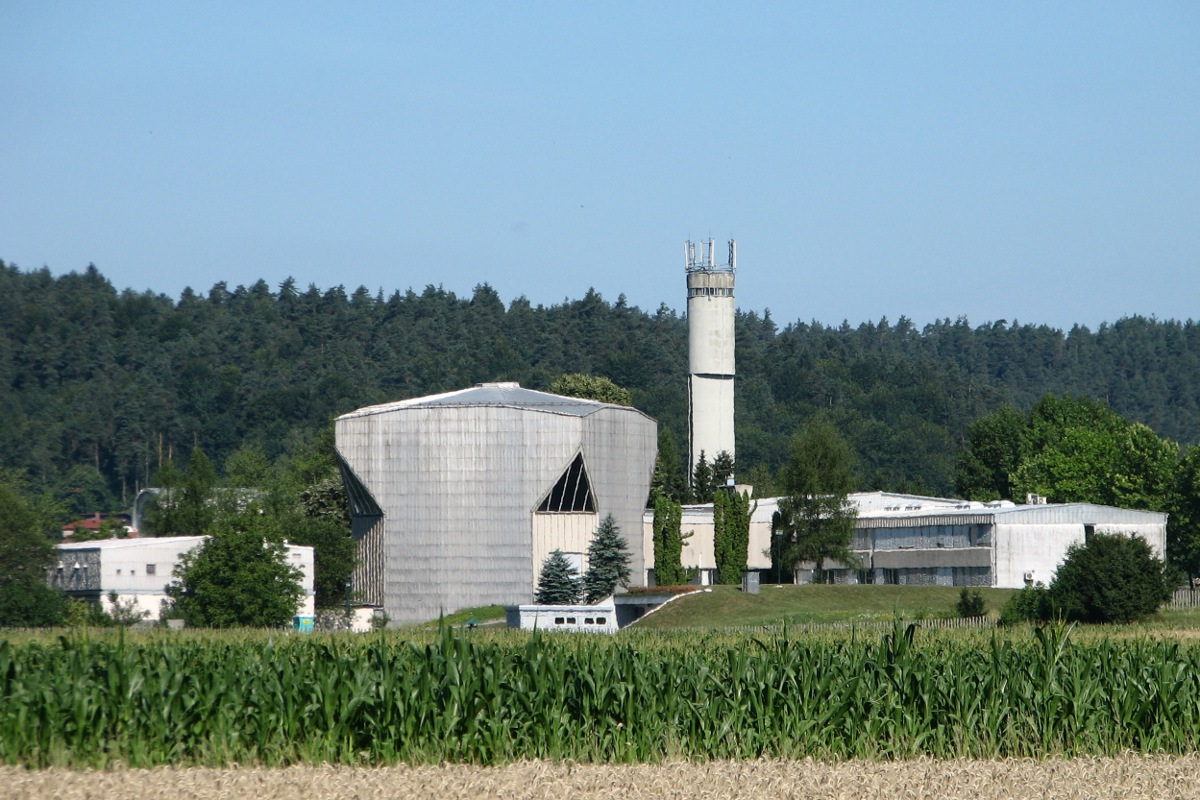
The Podgorica Reactor Center in Brinje

The institute's Podgorica Reactor Center is home to a pool type research reactor. The General Atomics TRIGA Mark II reactor is rated for a nominal 250 kW thermal. The reactor was first licensed in 1966 and is expected to continue operation at least into the 2030s.

The Central Radioactive Waste Storage of Slovenia is co-located at the institute's reactor facility. This facility is used for storage of the low- and intermediate-level solid radioactive waste from the Podgorica Reactor Center and other, non-institute small waste producers such as medical, research, and industrial applications of ionising radiation.

== Selection of online services from the institute ==
- VideoLectures.Net Collection of videos of scientific events
- AnswerArt Question Answering system
- SearchPoint Contextual Web Search
