= Branko Stanovnik =

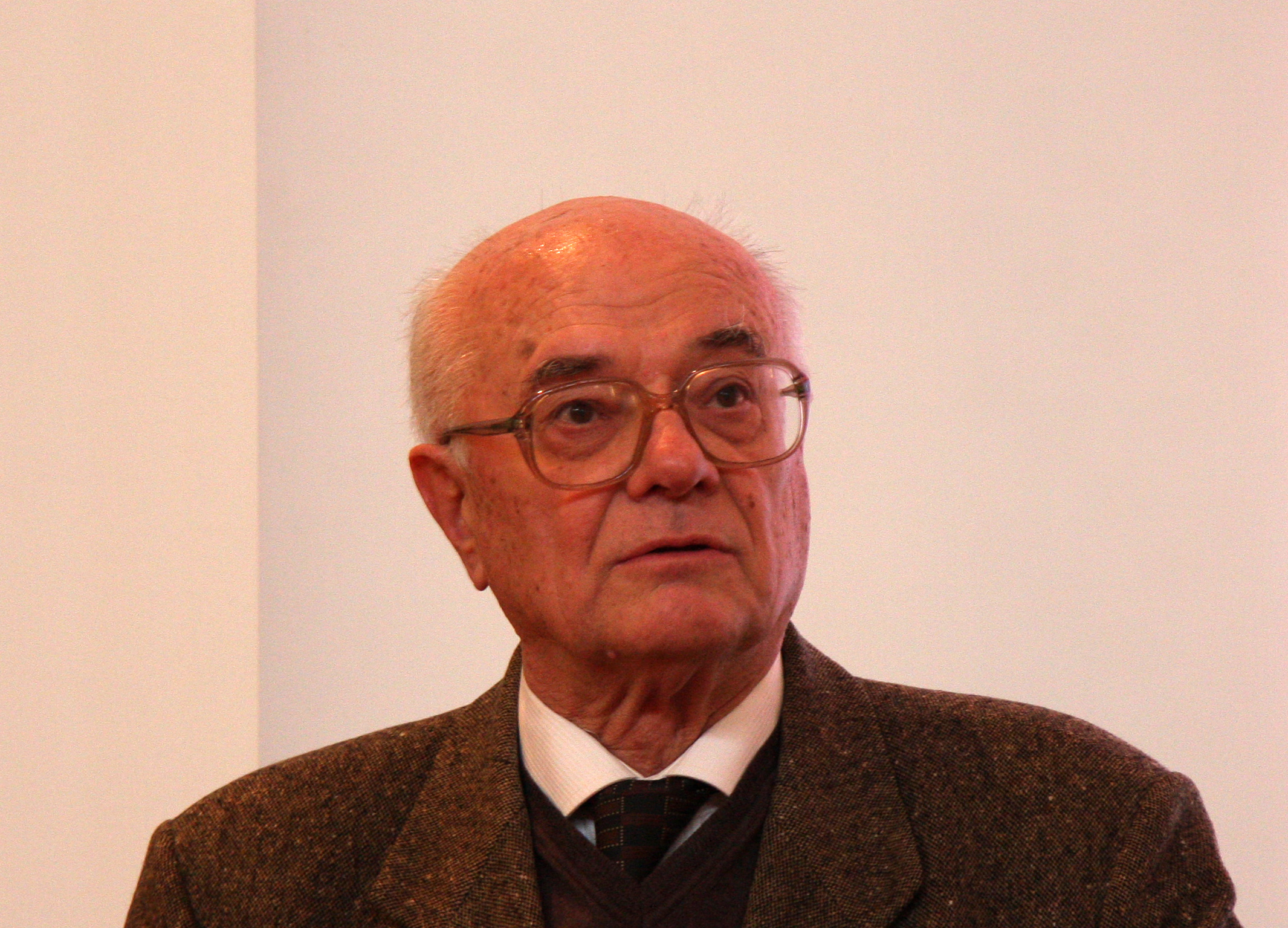
- Branko Stanovnik (2013)
- Born: August 11, 1938 (age 88)
- Education: University of Ljubljana
- Occupations: Chemist, academic
- Awards: Kidric Fund Award (1972); Boris Kidric Award (1977); Medal for Science (1977); Honorary Medal and Diploma of Technical University of Bratislava (1975); Kametani Award (2007); Medala and Memor (2007); Zois's Lifetime Achievement Award (2016)

Branko Stanovnik (born August 11, 1938) is a Slovenian chemist, specializing in organic chemistry, and member of the Slovenian Academy of Sciences and Arts (SAZU).

== Academic background ==
Stanovnik graduated from the Department of Chemistry of the Faculty of Mining and Technology, University of Ljubljana. He received his doctorate in organic chemistry in 1964, and was elected Assistant Professor in 1964, Associate Professor in 1967 and Full Professor of organic chemistry in 1972.

== Academic and research contributions ==
Stanovnik has been an associate member of SAZU since 1991, and a full member since 1995. Since 1999 he has been the head of the SAUL International Cooperation and Scientific Coordination.

He has been a Fellow of the Royal Society of Chemistry in London since 1984, and a regular member of The New York Academy of Sciences since 1995. He is also a member of the European Academy of Sciences and Arts.

Stanovnik was the head of the Chemistry Department in 1967-1968 and 1968-1969, Head of the Chair of Organic Chemistry 1984-89, Deputy Head of the Department of Chemistry and Chemical Technology, Faculty of Natural Sciences and Technology 1992-95, Vice-Dean of the Faculty of Chemistry and Chemical Technology 1995-97.

He has published more than 550 scientific and professional papers, mainly in international journals.

== Awards ==
Stanovnik won the Kidric Fund Award for Science in 1972, the Boris Kidric Award and Medal for Science in 1977 and the Honorary Medal and Diploma of Technical University of Bratislava in 1975.

In 2007, he received the Kametani Award and the Medal and Diploma "In Memory of Professor A. N. Kost".

Stanovnik was awarded the Zois Lifetime Achievement Award in 2016.
