= Niko Grafenauer =

Slovenian poet, essayist, literary historian, editor and translator

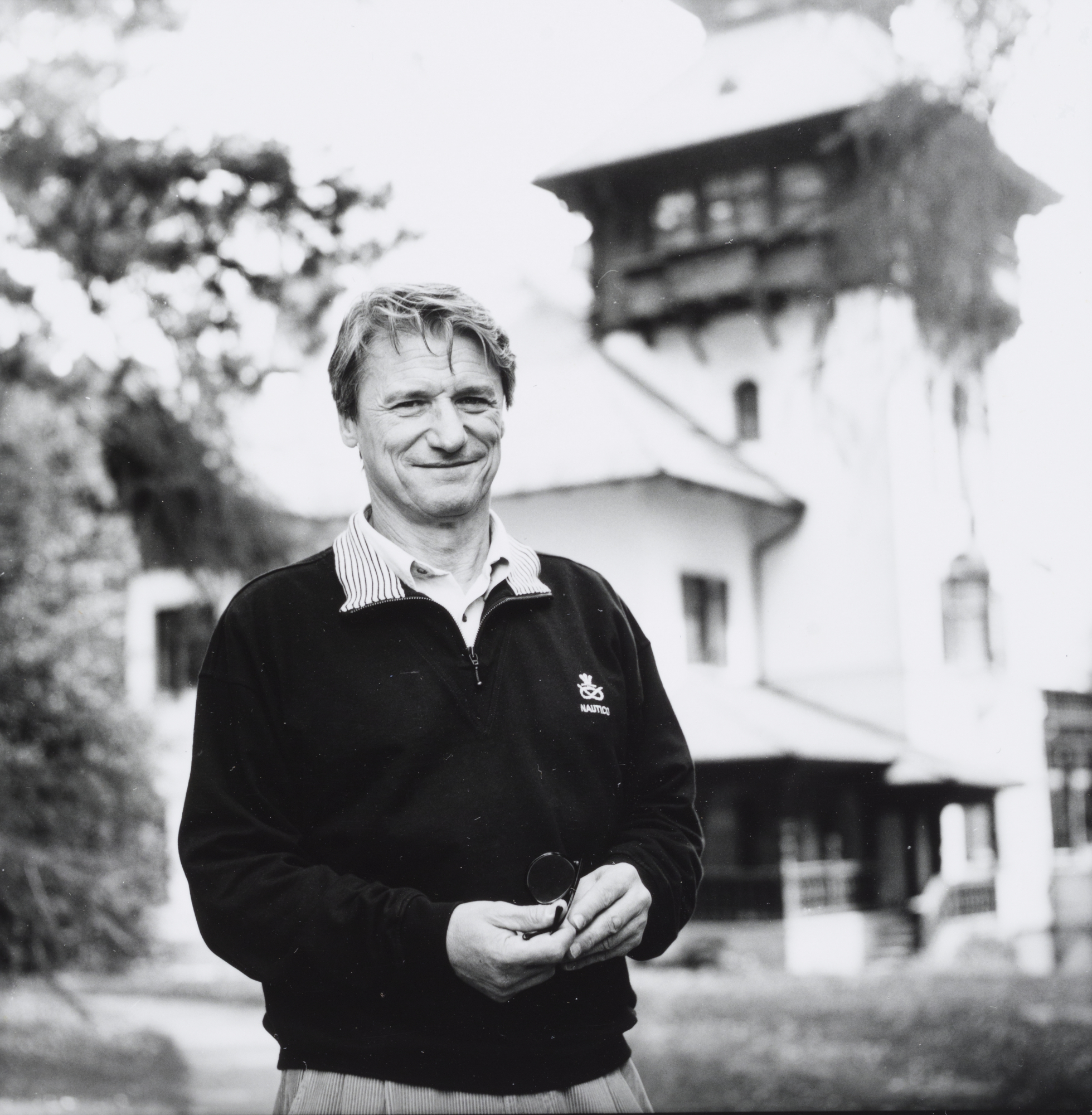
- Slovenian poet, essayist, literary historian, editor and translator
- Born: 5 December 1940 (age 85); Ljubljana, Drava Banovina, Kingdom of Yugoslavia (now in Slovenia)
- Occupations: Poet; essayist; editor

Niko Grafenauer (born 5 December 1940) is a Slovenian poet, essayist, literary historian, editor and translator. He is particularly known as author of popular children literature, and for his active participation in the Slovenian public life, especially in conservative and liberal conservative platforms.

He was born in Ljubljana, Slovenia (then part of the Kingdom of Yugoslavia), to a poor working-class family. Both his parents died in the first year of his life. He spent his childhood with his older sister in the small town of Velike Lašče. He attended high school in Cerknica. He enrolled at the University of Ljubljana, where he studied history of literature, graduating in 1969 under the supervision of the famous literary historian and philosopher Dušan Pirjevec.

He started publishing poetry already in the 1950s, especially in the literary magazine Sodobnost. In 1982, he was among the founders of the alternative opposition magazine Nova revija. In the 1990s and early 2000s, he served as its chief editor.

Grafenauer started with children's literature, the most famous of which was the collection Pedenjped, about a naughtly, stubborn, clumsy but independent and creative boy. Under the influence of philosophy, especially Heideggerianism and hermeneutics, Grafenauer later shifted to reflective poetry. However, his large corpus of children literature is still considered among the best in post-World War II Slovenian literature.

He lives in Ljubljana, and is active member of several civil society movements, most notably the Rally for the Republic. He is member of the Slovenian Academy of Sciences and Arts.
