= Irena Grafenauer =

Slovenian flutist (born 1957)

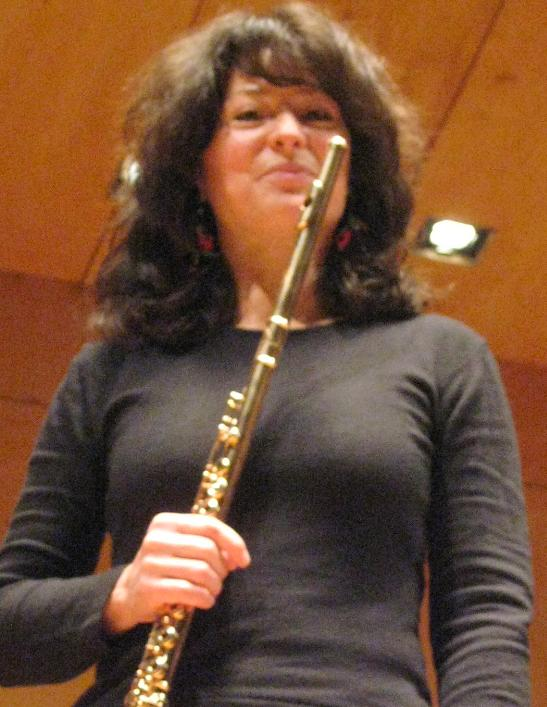
- Irena Grafenauer (2007)
- Born: June 19, 1957 (age 69); Ljubljana, Slovenia
- Education: Ljubljana Academy of Music
- Occupation: Classical flautist
- Organizations: Bavarian Radio Symphony Orchestra
- Awards: Prešeren Award

Irena Grafenauer (born 19 June 1957 in Ljubljana, Slovenia) is a Slovenian flute player and soloist, a pupil of Boris Čampa, Karlheinz Zöller and Aurèle Nicolet.

Irena Grafenauer was born to Stanko Grafenauer, a geologist, and Magdalena Grafenauer. She started her formal musical education at the age of 8. After graduating from the Academy of Music in Ljubljana in 1974, she continued her studies with Karlheinz Zöller and Aurèle Nicolet. She won First Prize in three international competitions: in Belgrade (1974), Geneva (1978) and Munich (1979). From 1977 to 1987 she was principal flautist with the Bavarian Radio Symphony Orchestra under Rafael Kubelik and Colin Davis. In October 1987 she was appointed Professor at the Salzburg Mozarteum. She has successfully toured most European countries, the United States, Japan, and Australia as a soloist. She has performed regularly at Gidon Kremer’s Lockenhaus Festival since 1981 and toured extensively with ”Kremer & Friends”.

Irena Grafenauer formed a duo with the harpist Maria Graf. She has also worked regularly with the Berlin Philharmonic Duo Jörg Baumann and Klaus Stoll, pianists Oleg Maisenberg, Robert Levin, and Helmut Deutsch, guitarist Eliot Fisk, and the Cherubini String Quartet.

Irena Grafenauer records exclusively for the Philips label. She has been contracted to record concertos and quartets by Mozart with members of the Academy of St Martin in the Fields and the French album with music by Debussy, Ravel, Ibert and Roussel.

She taught in Mozarteum, Salzburg, for almost 30 years.

In 2003, she was bestowed the golden order of freedom by the then President of Slovenia Janez Drnovšek for her achievements. At the same time, she also fell ill for chronic myeloid leukemia, a type of white blood cell cancer. She contributed significantly to the promotion of bone marrow transplantation in Slovenia.

Irena Grafenauer was also awarded a number of accolades for her endeavours in Slovenia: in 2004, she became the Slovene Woman of the Year (as selected by readers of the magazine Jana), she was bestowed an honorary doctorate by the University of Ljubljana, she became an honorary citizen of Ljubljana and an honorary member of the Slovenian Philharmonic Orchestra, and she was awarded the Prešeren Award for lifetime achievement in 2005.
