= Slovenian Academy of Sciences and Arts =

National academy of Slovenia

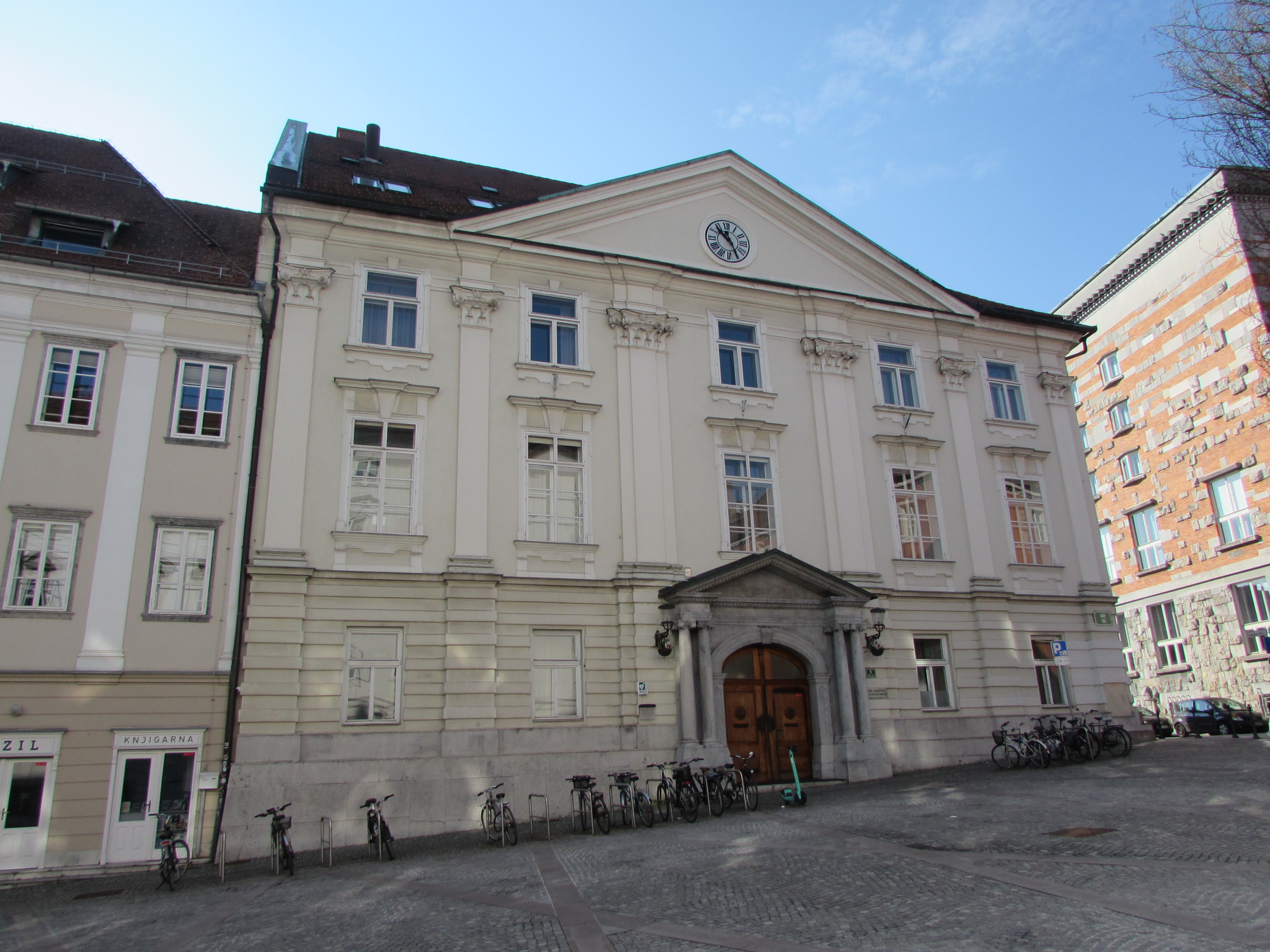
- Lontovž, the headquarters of the SAZU, at New Square (Novi trg) in Ljubljana
- Abbreviation: SAZU
- Formation: 1938
- Type: National academy
- Purpose: Science, arts, academics
- Headquarters: Ljubljana, Slovenia
- Location: 46°02′52″N 14°30′16″E
- Members: 93 members (as of August 2020)
- President: Peter Štih
- Website: sazu.si

The Slovenian Academy of Sciences and Arts (Slovene: Slovenska akademija znanosti in umetnosti (SAZU) (Note: Also occasionally abbreviated SASA in some English publications.)) is the national academy of Slovenia, which encompasses science and the arts and brings together the top Slovene researchers and artists as members of the academy.

== Cultural significance ==
Established in 1938, the Slovene Academy of Sciences and Arts (SAZU) is the supreme national institution for science and the arts. It associates scientists and artists who have been elected as its members for their outstanding achievements in the field of sciences and arts. It cultivates, encourages and promotes sciences and arts and, through its activities, contributes to the development of scientific thought and creativity in the arts, particularly by: addressing basic issues of sciences and arts; participating in establishing the policies of research activities and creativity in arts; giving appraisals, proposals and opinions on the position, development and promotion of sciences and arts and on the organisation of research activities and creativity in the arts; organising research work, also in co-operation with universities and other research institutions, particularly in the fields which are important for the awareness of and gaining insight into the natural and cultural heritage of the Slovene nation and for the development of its language and culture; and developing international co-operation in the field of sciences and arts.

== Leadership ==
The president (currently Peter Štih), the two vice-presidents, the secretary general and the secretaries of its various sections are elected for a period of three years with the possibility of one further re-election. SAZU can have a maximum of 60 full and 30 associate members; at present it has 84 full and 10 associate members. It can also have a maximum of 90 corresponding members from scientific institutions abroad; at present it has 85 such members.

SAZU is active in different fields of research, as reflected in the corresponding six sections of the Academy: The Section of Historical and Social Sciences has 11 full members, three associate members and 19 corresponding members, and comprises two subsections, Historical Sciences and Social Sciences. The Section of Philological and Literary Sciences has 15 full members, two associate members and 16 corresponding members. The Section of Mathematical, Physical, Chemical and Technical Sciences has 15 full members, four associate members and 17 corresponding members and comprises two subsections, Mathematical, Physical and Chemical Sciences and Technical Sciences. The Section of Natural Sciences has 12 full members, two associate members and eight corresponding members. The Section of Medical Sciences has nine full members, two associate members and 11 corresponding members. And the Section of Arts has 12 full members, six associate members and 14 corresponding members.

SAZU has founded 17 important research institutes from the fields of the humanities and natural sciences, each of which functions an autonomous research organisation, yet falls under the overall management of the Academy's Research Centre (ZRC SAZU).

SAZU also has several special units, including the Department for International Relations and Scientific Co-ordination is headed by a full member of SAZU and the Slovene Academy of Sciences and Arts (SAZU) Library, the third largest library in Slovenia, which regularly exchanges publications with scientific institutions all over the world.

== History ==
Slovenian scientists entertained the idea of an Academy since the establishment of the University of Ljubljana in 1919. The Scientific Society for Humanistic Sciences was established in 1921. In 1925 the Slovene Society, the National Gallery of Slovenia and Pravnik association drafted the first proposal for the law which would establish the academy. The second draft was completed in 1929 yet the Academy was not established until 11 August 1938.

SAZU was established in 1938 and was initially named Academy of Sciences and Arts (AZU). On 23 January 1943, AZU breached the cultural silence. Due to the efforts of Milan Vidmar, the epithet Slovenian was added to its name in 1943 with a decree by Leon Rupnik, the mayor of Ljubljana under the Italian annexation. The renaming was disregarded after the war.

In autumn 1945, the National Government of Slovenia led by Boris Kidrič took autonomy from the Academy and again named it Academy of Sciences and Arts. His father, the literary historian France Kidrič was elected its president, and confirmed for the second term in 1948. In 1948, it lost even more autonomy and was renamed to the Slovenian Academy of Sciences and Arts again. The academy lost its members with the new act and 30 days later ceased to exist. In 1949, an amendment to the act was passed that allowed for membership not only of scientists and artists, but also of those the deeds of which had a "special significance". In this manner, Josip Broz - Tito and Edvard Kardelj became its honorary members. Boris Kidrič, Josip Vidmar and Boris Ziherl were elected members, which significantly influenced the development of the Academy.

According to the Soviet scheme of development, the Institute of Physics and the Institute of Chemistry were established in 1946, followed by the Institute of Electrical Economics four years later. Despite this, humanistics, social sciences and classical natural history remained the dominating fields. In 1950, there were ten institutes, one board and one committee, among them the Institute of the Slovene language and the Institute of Literatures. In this time, the Academy divided into five classes: a class for historical and social sciences, a class for philological and literary sciences, a class for mathematical-physical and technical sciences, a class for natural history and medicine, and a class for arts. This make its composition similar to the current one.

SAZU joined the European Scientific Foundation in 1995.

== See also ==
- List of members of Slovenian Academy of Sciences and Arts
- Anton Melik Geographical Institute
- Jožef Stefan Institute
- ARNES
- University of Ljubljana
