= Slovene literature =

Slovene literature is the literature written in Slovene. It spans all literary genres; historical fiction has been a recurring strand within Slovene fiction. The Romantic 19th-century epic poetry of France Prešeren, a central author in the Slovene literary canon, influenced later developments in Slovene writing.

Literature played an important role in the development and preservation of Slovene identity because the Slovene nation did not have its own state until 1991 after the Republic of Slovenia emerged from the breakup of Yugoslavia. Poetry, narrative prose, drama, essay, and criticism kept the Slovene language and culture alive, allowing—in the words of Anton Slodnjak—the Slovenes to become a real nation, particularly in the absence of "masculine" attributes such as political power and authority.

== Early literature ==
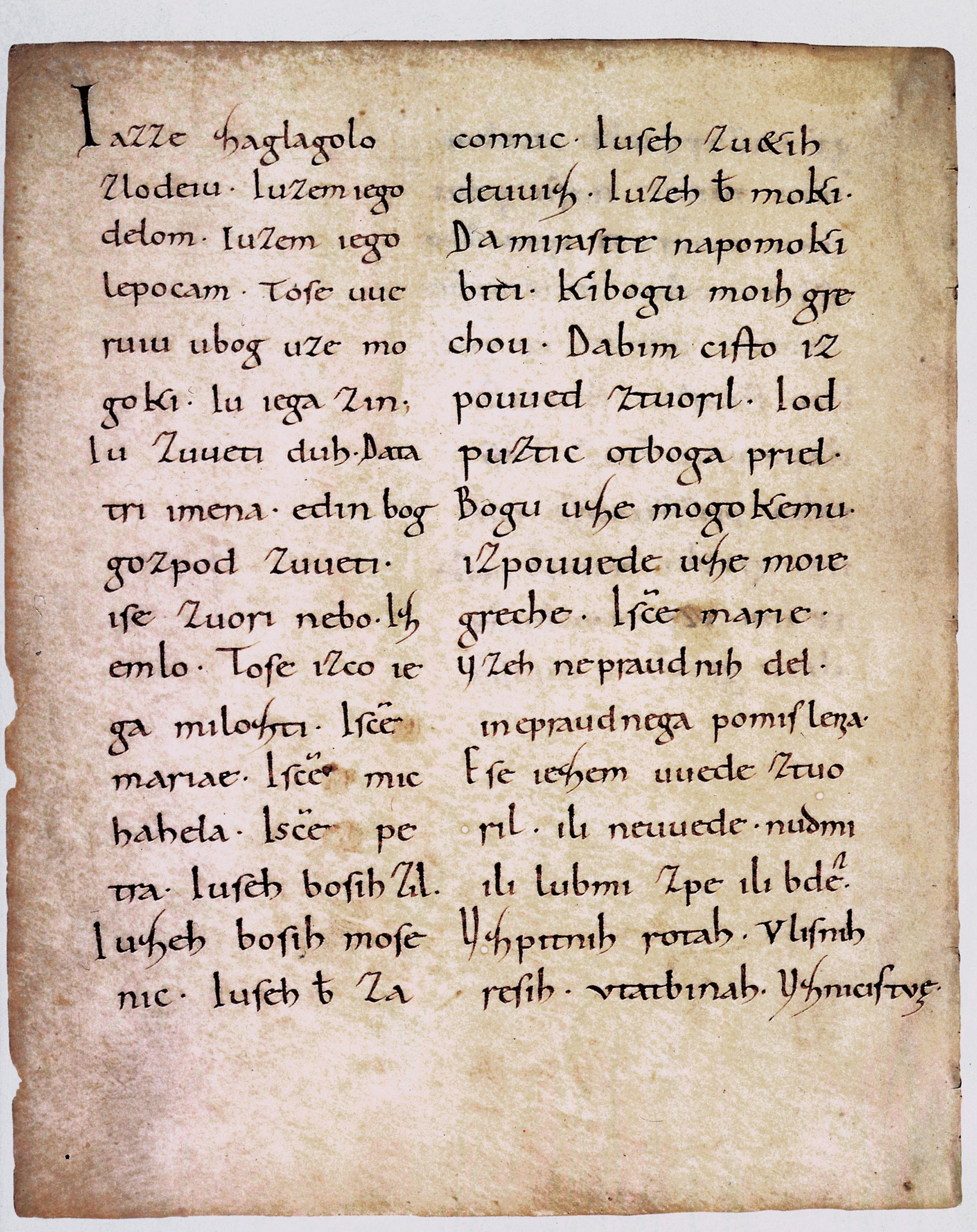
The Freising Manuscripts, dating from the 10th century, most probably written in upper Carinthia, are the oldest surviving documents in Slovene.

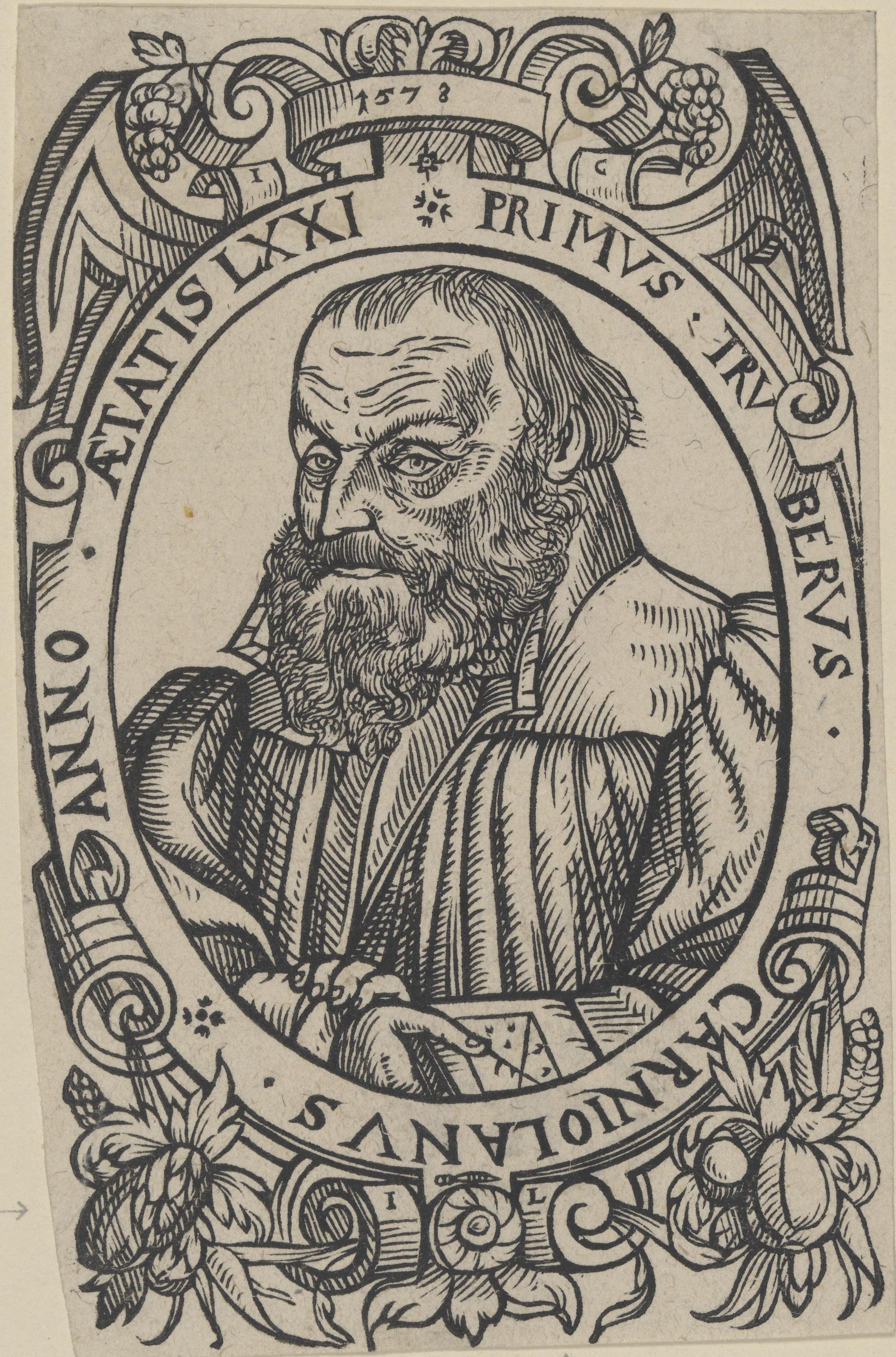
Protestant preacher Primož Trubar, author of the first printed book in Slovene

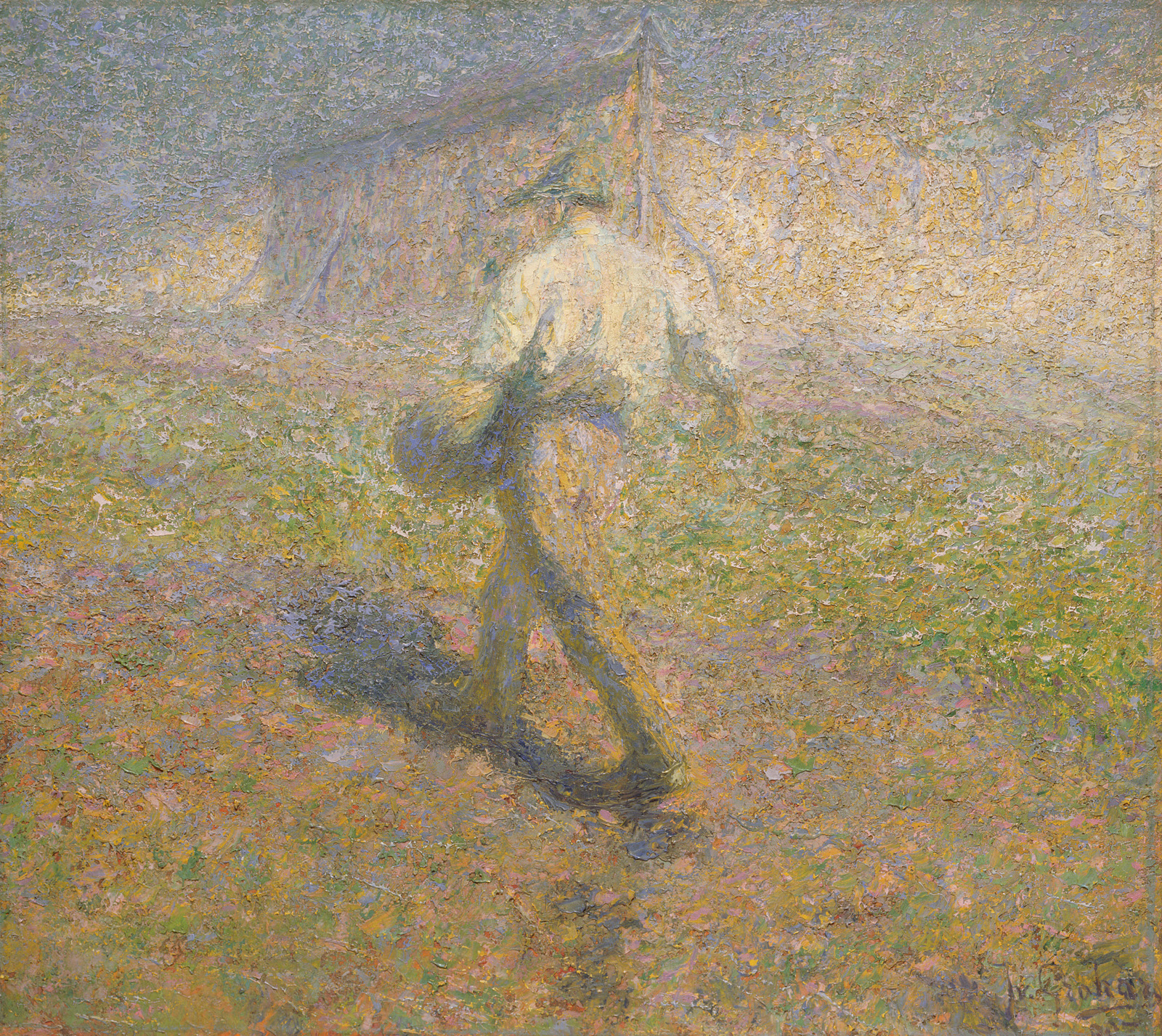
The Sower (1907) by the Impressionist painter Ivan Grohar is a metaphor for the Slovenes as a vigorous nation in front of an uncertain future and a nation that sows in order that it could harvest.

There are accounts that cite the existence of an oral literary tradition that preceded the Slovene written literature. This was mostly composed of folk songs and also prose, which included tales of myths, fairy tales, and narrations.

=== First written text ===
The earliest documents written in Old Slovene are the Freising manuscripts (Brižinski spomeniki), dated between 972 and 1022, found in 1803 in Freising, Germany. This book was written for the purpose of spreading Christianity to the Alpine Slavs and contained terms concerned with the institutions of authority such as oblast (authority), gospod (lord), and rota (oath).

=== First books ===
The first printed books in Slovene were Catechismus and Abecedarium, written by the Protestant reformer Primož Trubar in 1550 and printed in Schwäbisch Hall. Based on the work by Trubar, who from 1555 until 1577 translated into Slovene and published the entire New Testament, Jurij Dalmatin translated the entire Bible into Slovene from c. 1569 until 1578 and published it in 1583. In the second half of the 16th century, Slovene became known to other European languages with the multilingual dictionary, compiled by Hieronymus Megiser. Since then each new generation of Slovene writers has contributed to the growing corpus of texts in Slovene. Particularly, Adam Bohorič's Arcticae horulae, the first Slovene grammar, and Sebastjan Krelj's Postilla Slovenska, became the bases of the development of Slovene literature.

== Historical periods ==
=== Fin-de-siecle ===
This period encompasses 1899–1918.

=== 1945–1990 ===
==== Intimism ====
Intimism (Slovene: intimizem) was a poetic movement, the main themes of which were love, disappointment and suffering and the projection of poet's inner feelings onto nature. Its beginner is Ivan Minatti, who was followed by Lojze Krakar. The climax of Intimism was achieved in 1953 with a collection of poetry titled Poems of the Four (Pesmi štirih), written by Janez Menart, Ciril Zlobec, Kajetan Kovič and Tone Pavček. An often neglected female counterpart to the four was Ada Škerl, whose subjective and pessimistic poetic sentiment was contrary to the post-war revolutionary demands in the People's Republic of Slovenia.

==== Modernism ====
Expressionist tendencies in Slovene poetry were articulated early by Joza Lovrencic; his collection Deveta dežela (Trieste, 1917) is often cited as the first book-length Expressionist work in Slovene, and he developed the epic cycle Trentarski študent, later issued as Sholar iz Trente (1939).

== See also ==
- List of libraries in Slovenia
