= Melita Vovk =

Slovene painter and illustrator (1928–2020)

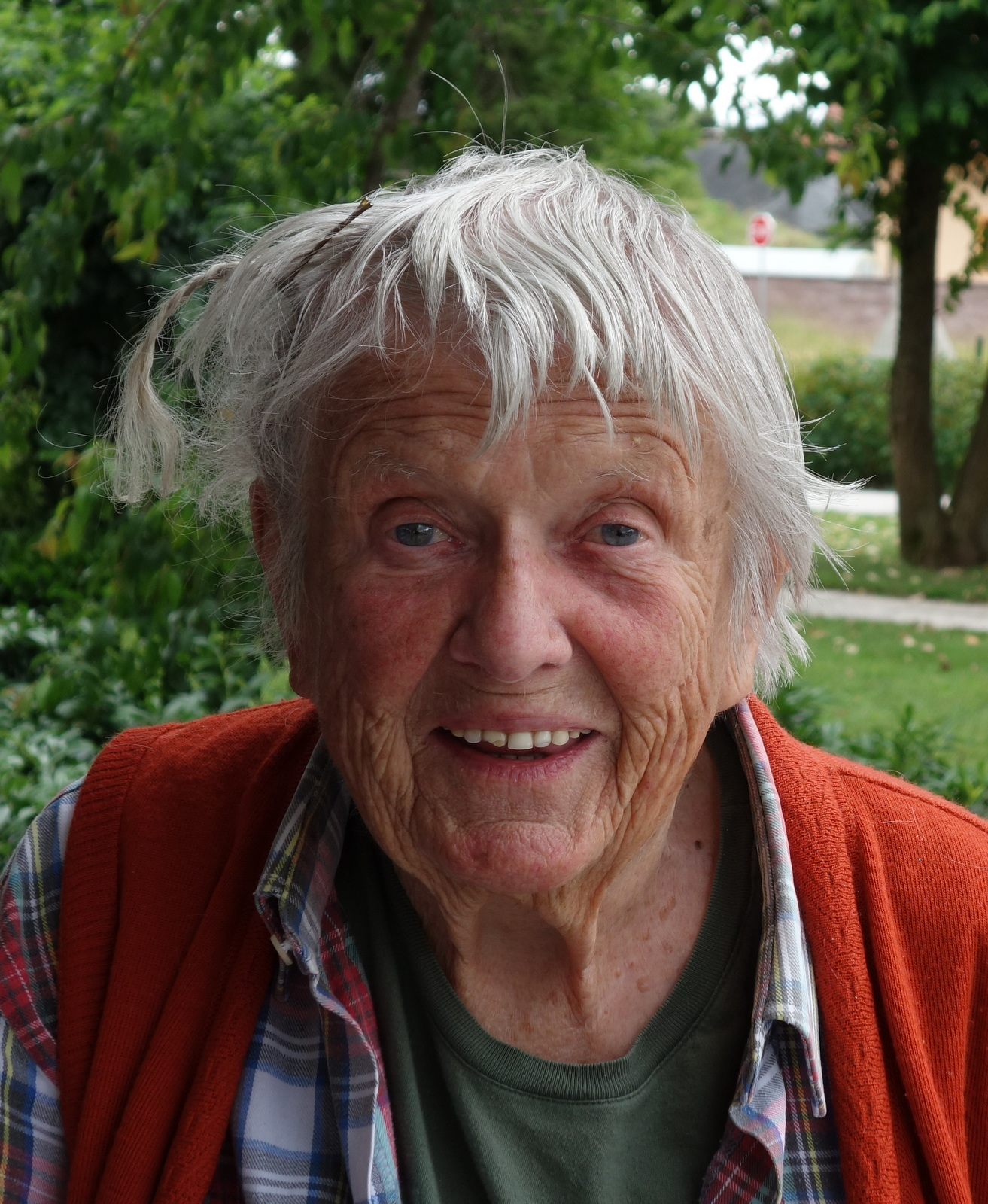
- Melita Vovk
- Born: 14 June 1928; Bled, Slovenia
- Died: 28 July 2020 (aged 92); Bled, Slovenia
- Education: Academy of Fine Arts, Ljubljana
- Known for: painting, illustrating
- Notable work: Painting and children's books illustration
- Awards: Levstik Award; 1957 Zgode in nezgode kraljevskega dvora Levstik Award; 1965 Basni and Puhek v Benetkah and Pustov god

Melita Vovk (14 June 1928 – 27 July 2020) was a Slovene painter and illustrator of children's books.

== Biography ==
Melita Vovk was born in Bled in 1928.

She has illustrated numerous children's books and won the Levstik Award twice, in 1957 for her illustrations for Zgode in nezgode kraljevskega dvora (Tales and Mishaps of the Royal Court) by Milan Šega and in 1965 for her illustrations for three books, Basni (Fables) by Ivan Krylov, Puhek v Benetkah (Puhek in Venice) by Mira Mihelič and Pustov god (Pust's Birthday) by Vera Albreht.

She received the lifetime achievement award for illustration at the 9th Slovenian Biennial of Illustration in 2010.

Vovk's first husband was the literary critic and stage director Bojan Štih and she was sometimes referred to as Melita Vovk Štih. Their daughter Ejti Štih is also a painter who lives and works in Santa Cruz in Bolivia.

== Selected Illustrated Works ==
- Ko zorijo jagode (When Strawberries Ripen), written by Branka Jurca, 1976
- Uganke (Riddles), written by Oton Župančič, 1975
- Zverinice z Večne poti (Little Beasts from the Eternal Road), written by Polonca Kovač, 1975
- Avtomoto mravlje (Automotive Ants), written by Jože Snoj, 1975
- Veliki čarovnik Ujtata (The Great Wizard Ujtata), written by Vida Brest, 1974
- Juri-Muri v Afriki (Juri-Muri in Africa), written by Tone Pavček, 1973
- Popki (Belly Buttons), written by Breda Smolnikar, 1973
- Nevsakdanje potovanje (An Unusual Trip), written by Ada Škerl, 1973
- Gimnazijka (High School Girl), written by Anton Ingolič, 1973
- Moja prva knjiga (My First Book), written by Tone Seliškar, 1969
- Teden ima sedem dni, sedem dni ima teden (The Week Has Seven Days, Seven Days Does Have the Week), written by Smiljan Rozman, 1969
- Novo leto na strehi (New Year on the Roof), written by Mira Mihelič, 1966
- Pustov god (Pust's Birthday), written by Vera Albreht, 1965
- Puhek v Benetkah (Puhek in Venice), written by Mira Mihelič, 1965
- Sračje sodišče ali Je, kar je (The Crows's Court Or What Is Just Is), written by Matej Bor, 1961
- Žemlje (Bread Rolls), written by Ferdo Godina, 1961
- Skriti dnevnik (The Hidden Diary), written by Leopold Suhodolčan, 1961
- Nekoč pod Gorjanci (Once Under the Gorjanci), written by Vera Albreht, 1960
- Tacek (Tacek), written by Ela Peroci, 1959
- Zgode in nezgode kraljevskega dvora (Tales and Mishaps of the Royal Court), written by Milan Šega, 1957
- Ptice in grm (The Birds and the Bush), written by Vida Brest, 1955
