= Mihelič =

Mihelič is a surname. Notable people with the surname include:

- France Mihelič (1907–1998), Slovene painter
- Mira Mihelič (1912–1985), Slovene writer and translator
- Rene Mihelič (born 1988), Slovene footballer
