= Josip Murn =

Slovenian poet

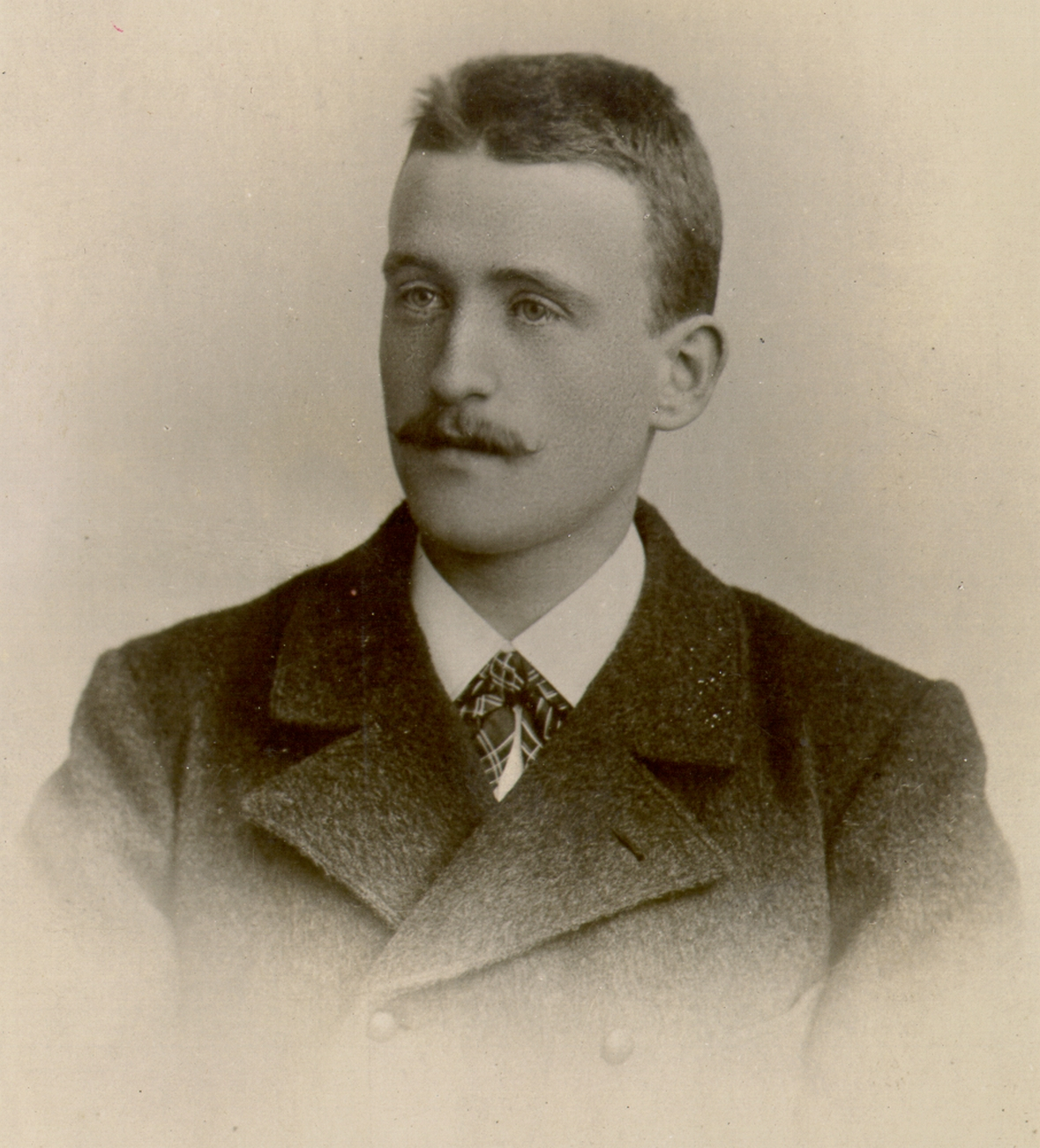
- Born: 4 March 1879; Ljubljana, Austria-Hungary
- Died: 18 June 1901 (aged 22); Ljubljana, Austria-Hungary
- Occupation: Poet
- Writing career
- Literary movement: Fin de siecle, Symbolism

Josip Murn (pronounced [ˈjóːsip ˈmùːɾn]), also known under the pseudonym Aleksandrov ([alɛˈksáːndɾɔw]; 4 March 1879 – 18 June 1901) was a Slovene symbolist poet. Together with Ivan Cankar, Oton Župančič, and Dragotin Kette, he was regarded as one of the beginners of modernism in Slovene literature. After France Prešeren and Edvard Kocbek, Murn was probably the most influential Slovene poet of the last two centuries.

== Life ==
Murn was born in a condominium in the very center of Ljubljana as an illegitimate son to a poor woman, Maria Murn, and baptized Josef. His mother moved to Trieste soon after his birth, leaving him in foster care to some relatives from the suburbs of Ljubljana.

As a teenager, he enrolled in the local high school, where he came in contact with other young Slovene literates, such as Ivan Cankar, Dragotin Kette, and Oton Župančič, who experimented in new trends of European poetry, in particular Slovene Moderna, a national literary trend that combined Naturalism, Impressionism, Decadence and Symbolist ideas. He was a gifted student, shy, but also very self-confident. He started writing poetry at a very young age and soon achieved a very high level of quality. His talent was spotted by a high-class society woman Franja Tavčar, the influential wife of the national-liberal politician and author Ivan Tavčar, who arranged for him a scholarship to study at the University of Vienna.

In 1898 he moved to Vienna, spending there a year mostly visiting literary cafés and art exhibitions. Strongly influenced by the Viennese Secession, he wrote a series of poems with the common title Fin de siècle, in which he delivered his impressions on the life in the metropolis.

In 1899, he moved back home and started traveling around the Slovene Lands. He spent several months in Upper Carniola, when he observed the peasant life style. He began to incorporate peasant motifs in his symbolist poetry. He took elements not only from Slovene, but also from Irish, Scottish, Slovak, and Latvian folk motifs.

He later traveled to the Austrian Littoral, visiting his mother in Trieste and living briefly in Grado before settling in the Vipava Valley for some time. There, he decided to adopt the pseudonym Aleksandrov, reminiscent of Slavic peasant archaism, and moved to an even more simple and impressionist poetic expression.

He settled in Ljubljana in 1901, renting a small room in a slum building on the banks of the river Ljubljanica (an abandoned sugar factory, known as Cukrarna). He died there at the age of 22 from tuberculosis, on the same bed as his friend Dragotin Kette just two years before.

He is buried in the Žale cemetery, next to the tombs of Dragotin Kette, Ivan Cankar and Oton Župančič, in what is known as the "monument of Slovene modernism" (Spomenik slovenske moderne).

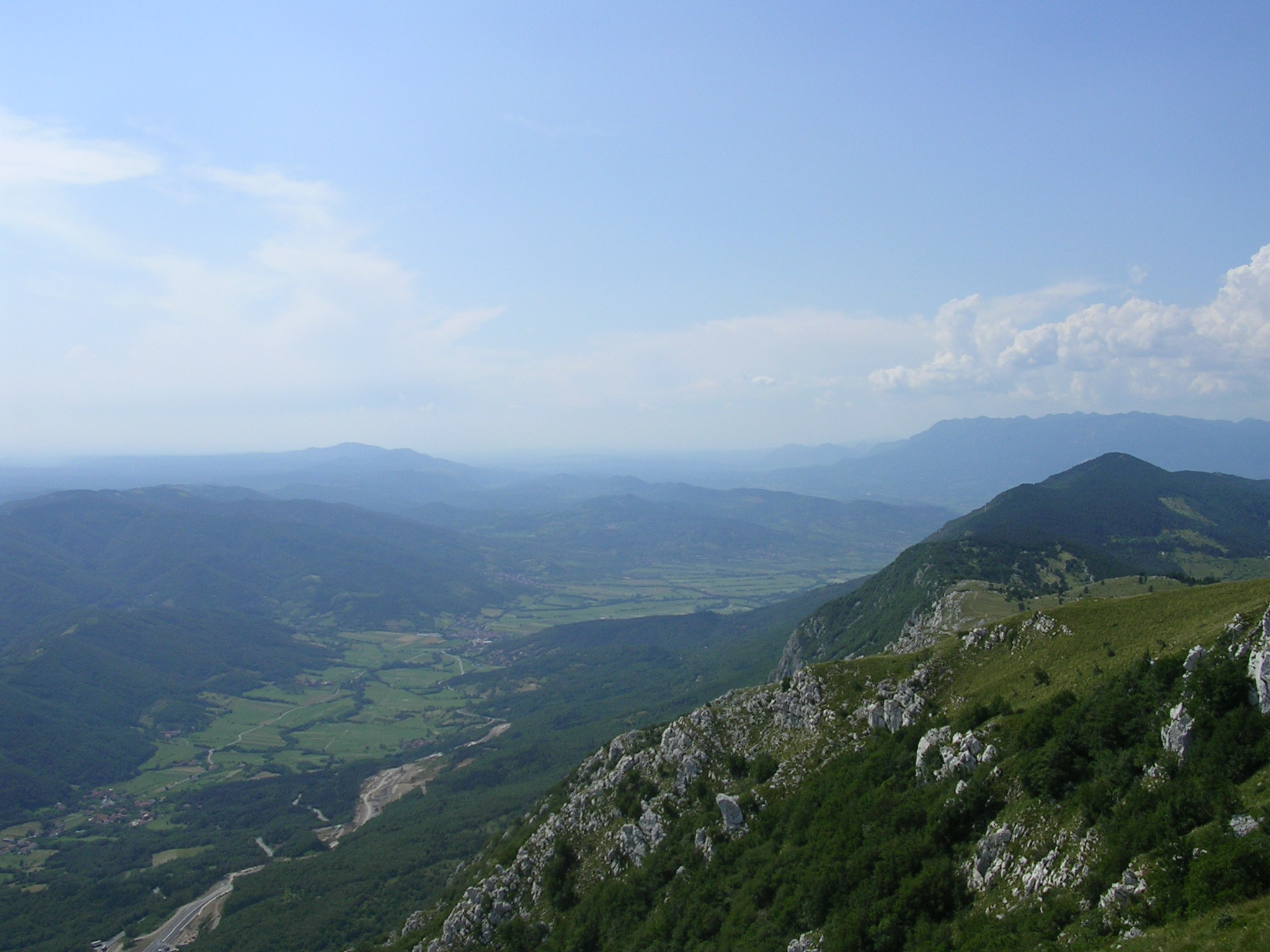
The scenery of the Vipava Valley, a major source of inspiration for Murn's poetry

== Reception ==
Murn remained mostly unacknowledged by contemporary critics. The doyen of 19th-century Slovene poetry, Anton Aškerc rejected him as a decadent. Even some of his closest colleagues, namely Cankar and Župančič, did not look favorably on his poetic endeavor, regarding it as too symbolist, abstract, "anemic," and "non-lively." He did gain some recognition during his Vienna period, when his poems were published in established literary magazines such as Ljubljanski zvon, but the later developments in his poetry did not receive a positive response by the public.

His fame came soon after his death. The literary critic, Ivan Prijatelj, edited a volume of his collected poems in 1903, jointly with a brilliant essay which gained recognition both to Murn and to Prijatelj himself as a literary critic. Prijatelj's essay also influenced Oton Župančič to change his opinion on Murn's poetry; as an homage to his late friend, Župančič wrote the poem "Manom Josipa Murna Aleksandra" (To the Manes of Josip Murn, a.k.a. Aleksandrov). By the end of the decade, Murn was already firmly established in the Slovene literary canon, and considered a great influence on Intimism and successive generations of poets, particularly Alojz Gradnik, Srečko Kosovel, Miran Jarc, France Balantič, Edvard Kocbek, Dane Zajc, Niko Grafenauer, and Jože Snoj. Snoj dedicated extensive studies to Murn's poetry.
