= Ivan Minatti =

Slovene poet, editor, and translator

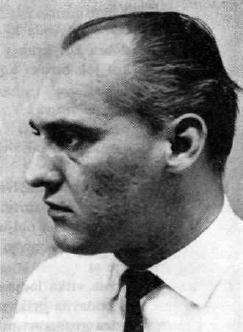
- Born: 22 March 1924; Slovenske Konjice, Kingdom of Serbs, Croats and Slovenes (now in Slovenia)
- Died: 9 June 2012 (aged 88); Ljubljana, Slovenia
- Occupations: Poet; translator; editor
- Writing career
- Notable works: You Have to Love Somebody (poem collection), The Pain of the Unexperienced (poem collection), I Listen to the Silence Inside Me (poem collection)
- Notable awards: Prešeren Fund Award; 1964 for the poem collection You Have to Love Somebody; Sovre Award; 1972 for the translations of Kočo Racin and Izet Sarajlić; Prešeren Award; 1985 for the poem collection I Listen to the Silence Inside Me; Veronika Award; 2009 for his life work
- Literary movement: Slovene Intimism

Ivan Minatti (22 March 1924 – 9 June 2012) was a Slovene poet, translator, and editor. He started writing poetry before World War II but principally belongs to the first postwar generation of Slovene poets. He is one of the best representatives of Slovene Intimism.

== Life ==
Minatti was born in 1924 in Slovenske Konjice in northeastern Slovenia. His family moved first to Slovenj Gradec and then to Ljubljana while he was still a child. He attended Gymnasium in Ljubljana, finished it in 1943, and then enrolled in medical studies, but postponed his education to join the Partisans in 1944. After the war, he studied Slavic studies at the Faculty of Arts of the University of Ljubljana and graduated in 1952. He worked as an editor at Mladinska Knjiga publishers from 1947 until his retirement in 1984. He became a regular member of the Slovenian Academy of Sciences and Arts in 1991. He died at the age of 88 and was buried at Žale in Ljubljana.

== Work ==
Minatti's poems, influenced by the horrors of the war, are lyrical and deal with modern-age resignation and melancholy. According to the poet Boris A. Novak, his work signified a radical break with collectivist postwar poetry and the start of personal poetry, making Minatti one of the breakthrough Slovene poets of the 20th century. The poet and translator Veno Taufer characterised him as a rock-steady and, at the same time, of a soft heart, and ascribed his success to his expression of human as well as social distress in postwar Communist Slovenia. Minatti is known for his references to nature. According to the poet Ciril Zlobec, he used nature as a source of deep symbols and metaphors for man and his life.

== Awards ==
Minatti won the Prešeren Fund Award in 1964 for his poetry collection You Have to Love Somebody (Slovene: Nekoga moraš imeti rad). In 1972, he won the Sovre Award, bestowed for the best translations into Slovene, for his translations of lyrical poems by the Macedonian poet Kočo Racin and the Bosnian poet Izet Sarajlić. In 1985, he won the Prešeren Award for his poetry collection I Listen to the Silence Inside Me (Prisluškujem tišini v sebi).

== Poetry collections ==
- Off-Trail (S poti, 1947)
- And the Spring Will Come (Pa bo pomlad prišla, 1955)
- You Have to Love Somebody (Nekoga moraš imeti rad, 1963)
- The Wind Sings (Veter poje, 1963)
- The Pain of the Unexperienced (Bolečina nedoživetega, 1964)
- Poems (Pesmi, 1971)
- The Face (Obraz, 1972)
- When I Am Silent and Good (Ko bom tih in dober, 1973)
- The Poems (Pesmi, 1977) - with Janez Menart and Lojze Krakar
- I Eavesdrop on the Silence Within Me (Prisluškujem tišini v sebi, 1984)
- Behind the Closed Eyelids: Chosen Poems (Pod zaprtimi vekami, izbrane pesmi, 1999)
- Minatti – Chosen Lyrical Poetry (Minatti – izbrana lirika, 2004)
