= Writers' Constitution =

The "Writers' Constitution" (Pisateljska ustava) was an informal draft of a constitution of the Slovene state prepared at the time when unity of the Socialist Federal Republic of Yugoslavia began to crumble, as an expression of the will of the Slovene nation to self-determine. The text entitled "Gradivo za slovensko ustavo" (Materials for the Slovene constitution) was published on 15 April 1988 in the journal Časopis za kritiko znanosti and presented ten days later as "Teze za Ustavo Republike Slovenije" (Theses for the Constitution of the Republic of Slovenia) at a public event in Cankar Centre, Ljubljana. This text later served as the basis for the current Constitution of Slovenia, therefore the "Writers' Constitution" is regarded one of the pillars of Slovene statehood and one of the key events in the process of gaining independence.

Writing was spurred by the 1987 amendments to the Yugoslav constitution which meant the federation would become highly centralized. In response, the Slovene Writers' Association (Društvo slovenskih pisateljev, DSP) proposed a new Slovene constitution and formed a constitutional committee which prepared several contributions, later joining forces with the Slovene Sociological Association (Slovensko sociološko društvo, SSD) which formed a working group as well. Members of these bodies were:

DSP constitutional committee	SSD working group
Tone Peršak; Milan Apih; Janez Menart; Tone Pavček; Dimitrij Rupel; Veno Taufer	Peter Jambrek (head); France Bučar; Tine Hribar; Mitja Kamušič; Veljko Rus; Ivan Svetlik

The document expressed the desire to change the current political system, emphasizing the right of self-determination, sovereignty and full statehood. A modern – short and concise – constitutional draft was created, which only specified the basis of state organization and protected basic rights of individuals while allowing plenty of freedom in societal organization. The authors used a collections of articles "Contributions to the Slovene National Program" published in the 57 issue of the magazine Nova revija (1986) as a basis. The resulting text was dubbed the "Writers' Constitution" because of the important role of writers in its forming.

Later, the newly formed DEMOS coalition took on the task of finalizing the constitution and prepared a very similar draft. After DEMOS won the 1990 parliamentary election, this draft was taken as a basis by the constitutional committee of the Slovene assembly which finalized the so-called "Podvin Constitution" (Podvinska ustava) in August 1990. The coalition intended to adopt it by the end of 1990, but the process was delayed because of the controversies regarding the phrase "sanctity of life" which was taken from the preamble of the Writers' Constitution (also connected with the debate about abortion rights). After a consensus was reached, the assembly adopted it as the Constitution of the Republic of Slovenia on 23 December 1991.
