= Joza Lovrencic =

Slovene poet, editor and translator (1890–1952)

Joža Lovrenčič
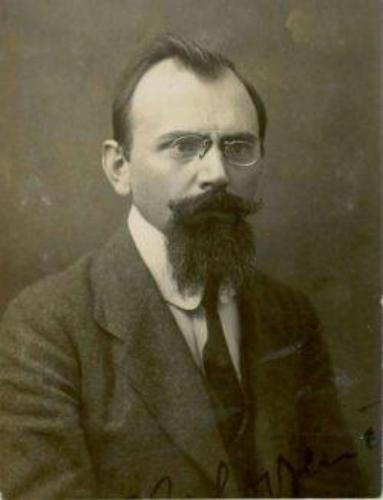
- Joža Lovrenčič, c. 1920. Public domain (Wikimedia Commons).
- Born: Joža Lovrenčič; 2 March 1890; Kred (near Kobarid), Cisleithania, Austro-Hungarian Empire
- Died: 11 December 1952 (aged 62); Ljubljana, People's Republic of Slovenia (then part of the Federal People's Republic of Yugoslavia)
- Education: University of Graz
- Occupations: Poet; prose writer; editor; translator; secondary-school teacher
- Spouse: Antonietta Manzoni
- Children: Jože Lovrenčič; Nina A. Lovrenčič-Lenček
- Writing career
- Language: Slovene
- Period: 1910–1952
- Notable works: Deveta dežela (1917); Trentarski študent / Sholar iz Trente (1915–1922; ed. 1939); Tiho življenje (1931); Pereči ogenj (1928); Publius in Hispala (1927)
- Movement: Expressionism

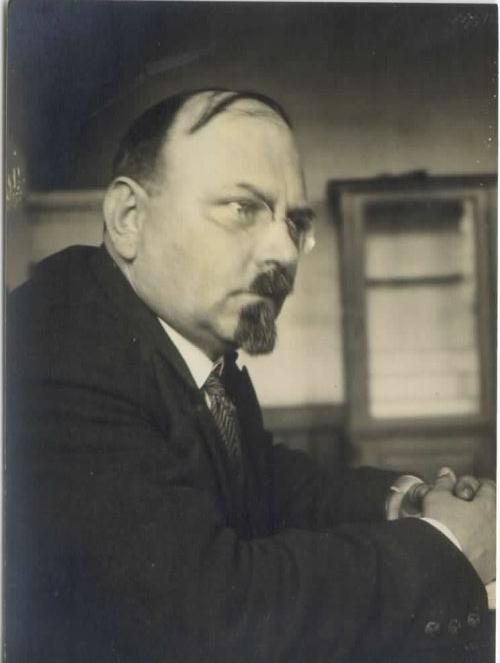
Lovrenčič in the 1940s. Public domain (Wikimedia Commons).

Joža Lovrenčič (2 March 1890 – 11 December 1952) was a Slovene philologist, poet, prose writer, editor, translator and teacher, regarded as one of the early introducers of Expressionism into Slovene poetry. His collection Deveta dežela (Trieste, 1917) is frequently cited as the first book-length Expressionist poetry collection in Slovene, while the epic cycle Trentarski študent—issued in book form as Sholar iz Trente (1939)—is considered among the most ambitious Slovene epic attempts of the first half of the 20th century. In 1946 he was convicted in a political trial and imprisoned; although pardoned the same year, his books were withdrawn from general access and he was sidelined professionally under postwar library-purge policies.

== Biography ==
Lovrenčič was born in Kred (municipality of Kobarid). He attended secondary school in Gorizia and studied Slavic studies and Latin at the University of Graz, completing a doctorate on 12 January 1915. Between 1914 and 1916, he taught at the Gorizia gymnasium and, during the wartime relocation, at courses for the Slovene gimnazija in Trieste. In 1919, he represented the Goriška region in the provisional national body in Belgrade and served as a delegate to the Paris Peace Conference (November–December 1919). From 1920 he taught in Ljubljana, and between 1931 and 1941/42 he edited the student periodical Mentor.

=== Second World War ===
After the fall of Fascism and the establishment of the Operationszone Adriatisches Küstenland, in 1944–1945 he was appointed headmaster of the Slovene gymnasium in Gorizia when the institution was re-opened in the city; he also engaged in local cultural activities and wrote for the weekly Goriški list.

== Literary career ==
Lovrenčič began publishing in Vrtec, Slovan, Omladina and, regularly, in Dom in svet. His poetics moved from Impressionism to free verse with condensed, chromatic and spiritually inflected imagery; Deveta dežela (Trieste, 1917) is often named as the first Expressionist poetry collection in Slovene. In epic verse he developed the cycle Trentarski študent (1915–1922), a modern reworking of legends from the Trenta Valley, published in book form as Sholar iz Trente. Ep iz XVI. stoletja (Ljubljana, 1939). He also wrote historical and legend-based prose, including Publius in Hispala (Ljubljanski zvon, 1927), Pereči ogenj. Povest izpod Jamnika (1928) and Tiho življenje (1931).

=== Translations and philology ===
Beyond adaptations for young readers (Collodi, Jón Sveinsson, Zane Grey), between 1950 and 1952 he prepared a complete translation of Ovid’s Metamorphoses. Long unpublished, it has been appearing since 2017 with critical apparatus in Keria. Parts issued to date include books 13–15 (2017), 10–12 (2018) and 7–9 (2018). The discovery and editing of the manuscript has been analysed by David Movrin.

== 1946 trial, pardon and postwar library purges ==
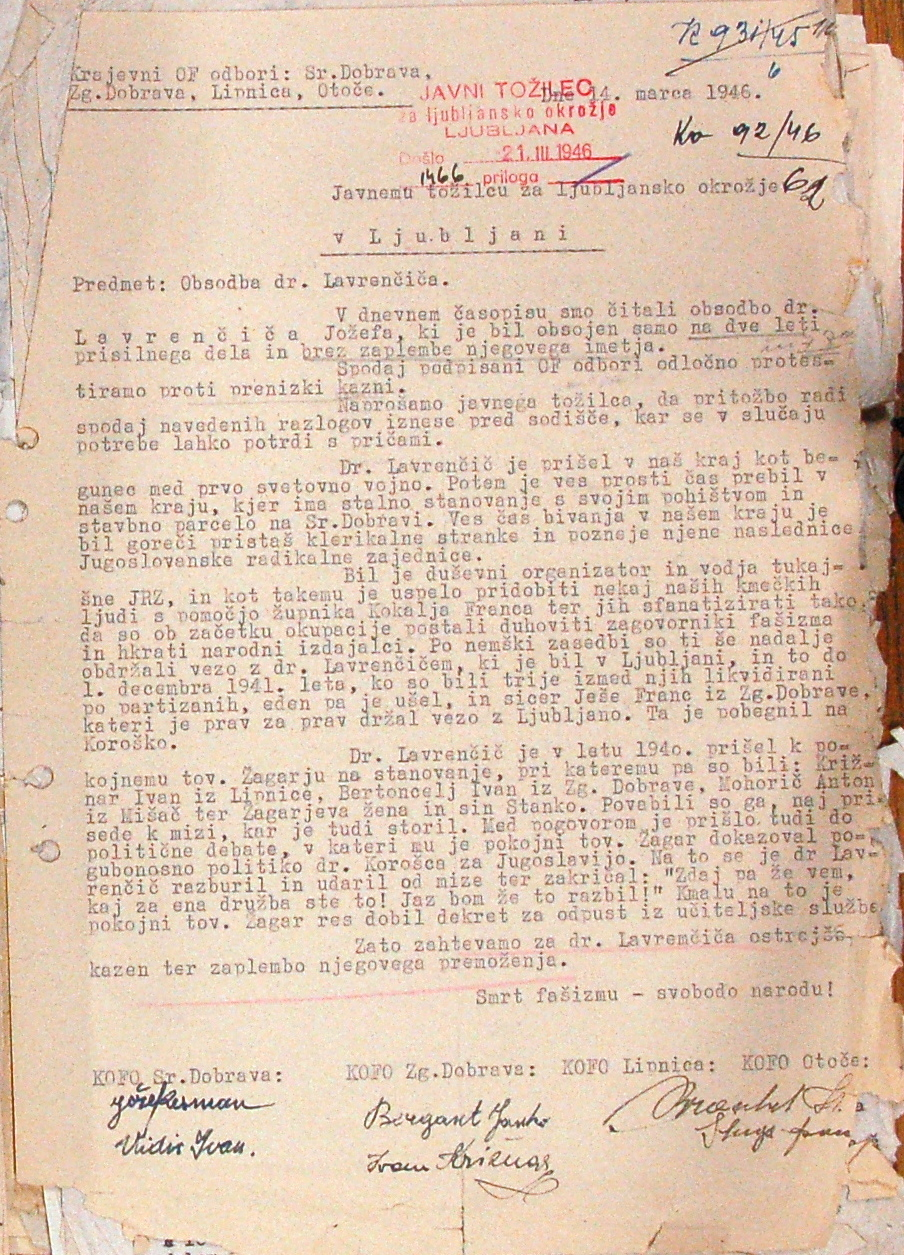
Circular (1946) from local committees of the Liberation Front of the Slovene Nation regarding Lovrenčič’s conviction. Vovko family archive (Wikimedia Commons).

In 1946, Lovrenčič was prosecuted by the new Slovene authorities for his political role in Gorizia during 1944–1945—particularly his headship of the gymnasium under German administration—and sentenced to two years’ imprisonment; he was pardoned later that year. Despite the pardon, he was not publicly rehabilitated. Within the wider context of censorship and the post-1945 "cleansing" of libraries, his works were removed from open access and he was excluded from teaching and editorial work.

== Selected works ==
Poetry and epic

- Deveta dežela (Trieste: J. Štoka, 1917).
- Trentarski študent (1915–1922, in journals); book version: Sholar iz Trente. Ep iz XVI. stoletja (Ljubljana: Jugoslovanska knjigarna, 1939).
- Tri božje poti (Ljubljana, 1944).

Fiction and historical prose

- Gorske pravljice (Gorizia, 1921).
- Publius in Hispala (Ljubljanski zvon, 47/1, 1927).
- Pereči ogenj. Povest izpod Jamnika (Gruda, 1928).
- Tiho življenje (Ljubljana: Mladinska matica, 1931).

Correspondence and editions

- Ves vaš ljubeči očka. Pisma hčerki Nini (1919–1952) (ed. Rozina Švent; Celje/Gorica: Celjska & Goriška Mohorjeva družba, 2010).

== Reception and legacy ==
Criticism has emphasised his passage from Impressionism to a religiously inflected Expressionism, his use of free verse and the scale of his epic design. Recent studies have discussed classical intertextuality and macaronic Latin in Sholar iz Trente. The posthumous publication of his Ovid has renewed interest in his philological and literary legacy.

== Controversies ==
Debate has focused on his wartime headship of the Gorizia gymnasium (1944–1945) and the political nature of the 1946 trial. Although pardoned in the same year, administrative measures persisted (withdrawal of works and professional marginalisation) as part of cultural policy in socialist Yugoslavia.

== Images ==
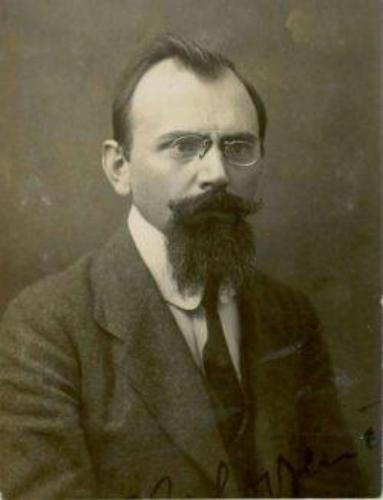
Portrait of Joža Lovrenčič.

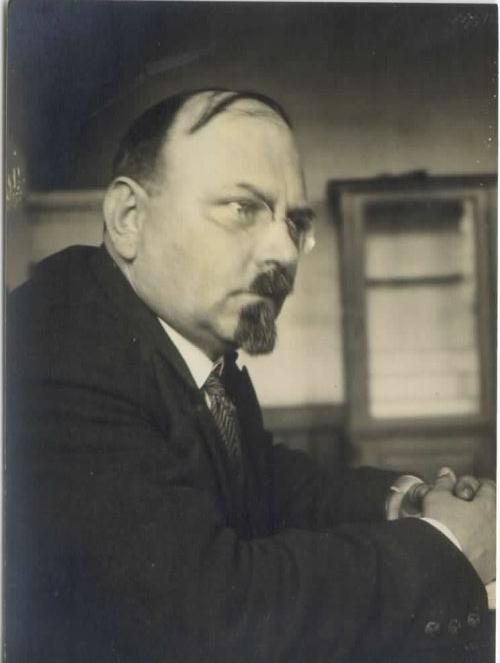
Lovrenčič in the 1940s

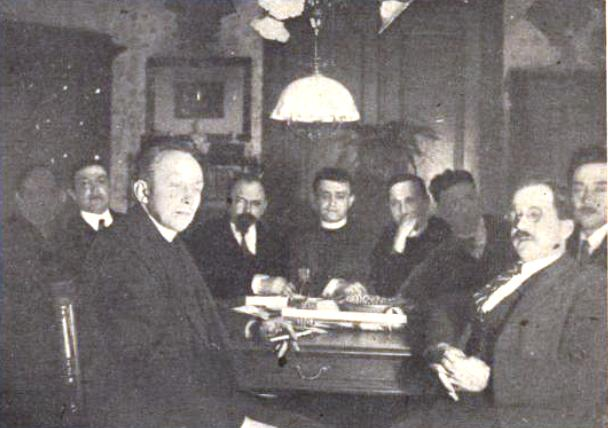
Literary gathering (pre-1945). Middle row: France Koblar, Lojze Remec, Joža Lovrenčič, Butkovič-Domen, France Zabret, Tine Debeljak and France Stele

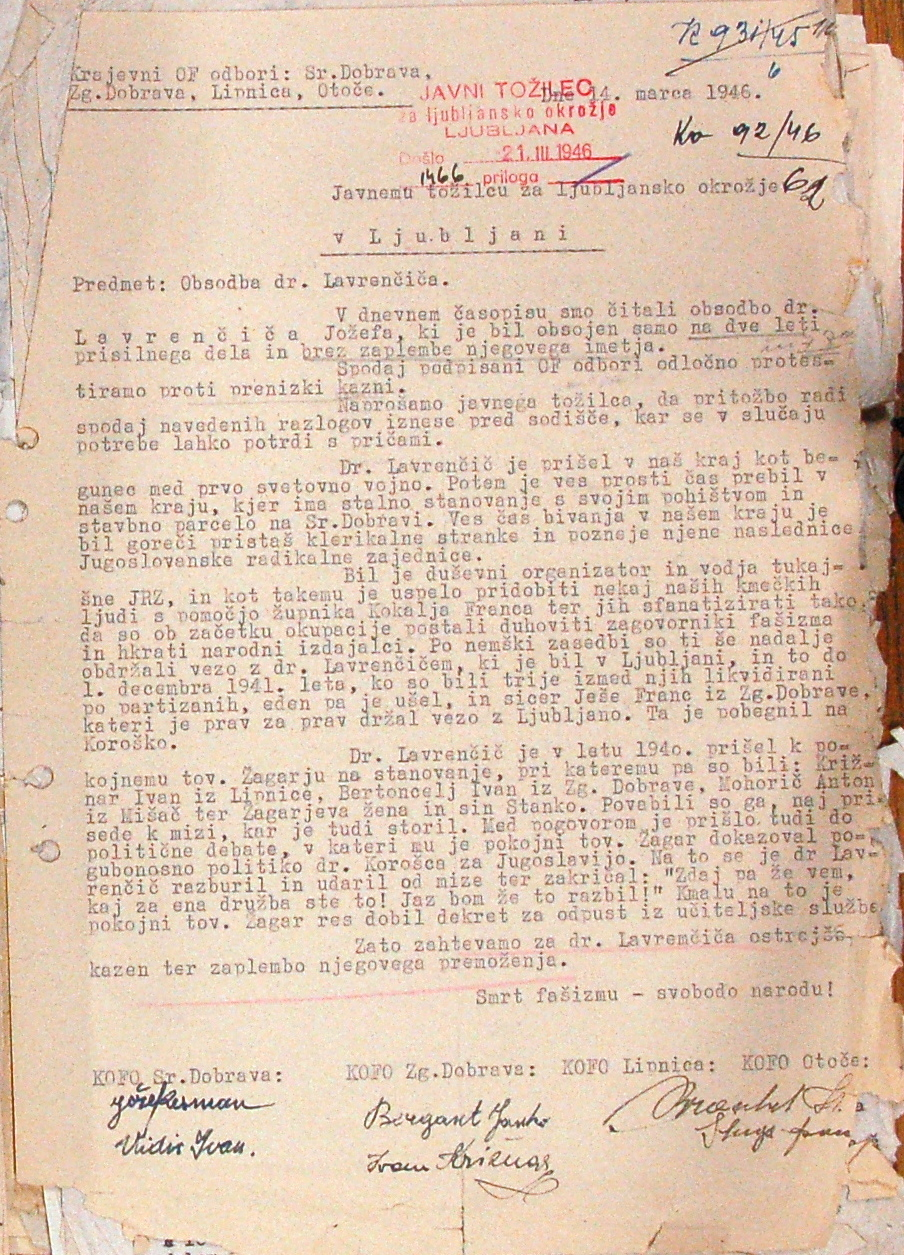
OF circular (1946) on Lovrenčič's criminal case. Vovko family archive

== See also ==
- Slovene literature
- Expressionism
- Gorizia
- Ovid and Metamorphoses
- Censorship in socialist Yugoslavia
