= Ada Škerl =

Slovene poet, writer and translator

Ada Škerl (3 April 1924, in Ljubljana – 29 May 2009, in Maribor) was a Slovene poet, writer and translator from French.

== Life ==
Ada Škerl was born on 3 April 1924, in Ljubljana. During the Second World War, she was a member of the Liberation Front of the Slovene Nation. After the war, she enrolled for Slavic studies at the Ljubljana Faculty of Philosophy, as well as for dramatics at the Academy of Theatre, Radio, Film and Television (Ljubljana).

Škerl worked at the publisher Mladinska knjiga for a period. She worked as a teacher in Škofja Loka for three years, then returned to Ljubljana.

Between 1958 and 1982, she worked for Radiotelevizija Slovenija.

Škerl would perform her poetic works on stage, earning her popularity and publication in literary journals. But after the Second World War, it was considered necessary to strengthen the national spirit towards the reconstruction of the homeland. Her poetry was rejected by the establishment. She was accused of petty sentimentalism and threatened with censorship. She withdrew from literary life for years after this attack.

Škerl spent the last years of her life in Maribor. She died on 29 May 2009.

== Work ==
Škerl is primarily known for her poetry. Her first book of poems Senca v srcu (Shadow in the Heart) was published in 1949, while Obledeli pasteli (Faded Pastels) came out in 1965, and Temna tišina (Dark Silence) in 1992.

Facing censorship and critical rejection for Senca v srcu, Škerl withdrew from literary life for years. Because of the propaganda against her book, it had sold out, but by the time her next collection was published, Slovene poetry was leaning towards modernism, and her observations of intimacy remained on the periphery of the literary scene.

Škerl's first book was considered a break from objectivist poetry. Written in metaphorical language, the poems depicted the pain of unfulfilled erotic expectations, which leads to a feeling of isolation, doubt, weariness and fear. The next, Faded Pastels, remained true to her attitude to life, and was sympathetic and self-denying. Her final collection, Dark Silence, was the final fulfillment of a poet who had remained vivid in the literary scene, even if marginalised.

She also wrote books for children. Zgodba o morskem konjičku was published in 1953, Voščila in 1962, and Nevsakdanje potovanje in 1973.

Her translations of children's literature from French were also well received. Among others, she translated Claude Aveline's Baba Diène et Morceau-de-Sucre in 1953, and Victor Hugo's Les travailleurs de la mer in 1956.

In her last years, she was considered the lone woman aspect of the poetic collective Pesmi štirih, along with Janez Menart, Ciril Zlobec, Kajetan Kovič and Tone Pavček.

Škerl's works began to receive appreciation towards the end of her life. Her poems from Senca v srcu were set as libretto by Ivo Svetina for an opera on her life performed by the Ljubljana Slovene National Theatre Opera and Ballet in 2017.

== Bibliography ==
- Senca v srcu. Založba Mladinska knjiga. 1949.
- Zgodba o morskem konjičku. Primorska založba. 1953.
- Voščila. Založba Mladinska knjiga. 1962.
- Obledeli pasteli. Založba Lipa. 1965.
- Nevsakdanje potovanje. Založba Mladinska knjiga. 1973.
- Temna tišina. Državna založba Slovenije. 1992.

=== Translations ===
- Claude Aveline (1953). Baba Diène et Morceau-de-Sucre [Baba Dijen in Košček Sladkorja]. Založba Mladinska knjiga.
- Victor Hugo (1956). Les travailleurs de la mer [Pomorščaki]. Slovenski knjižni zavod.
