= Ponikve, Sežana =

Ponikve
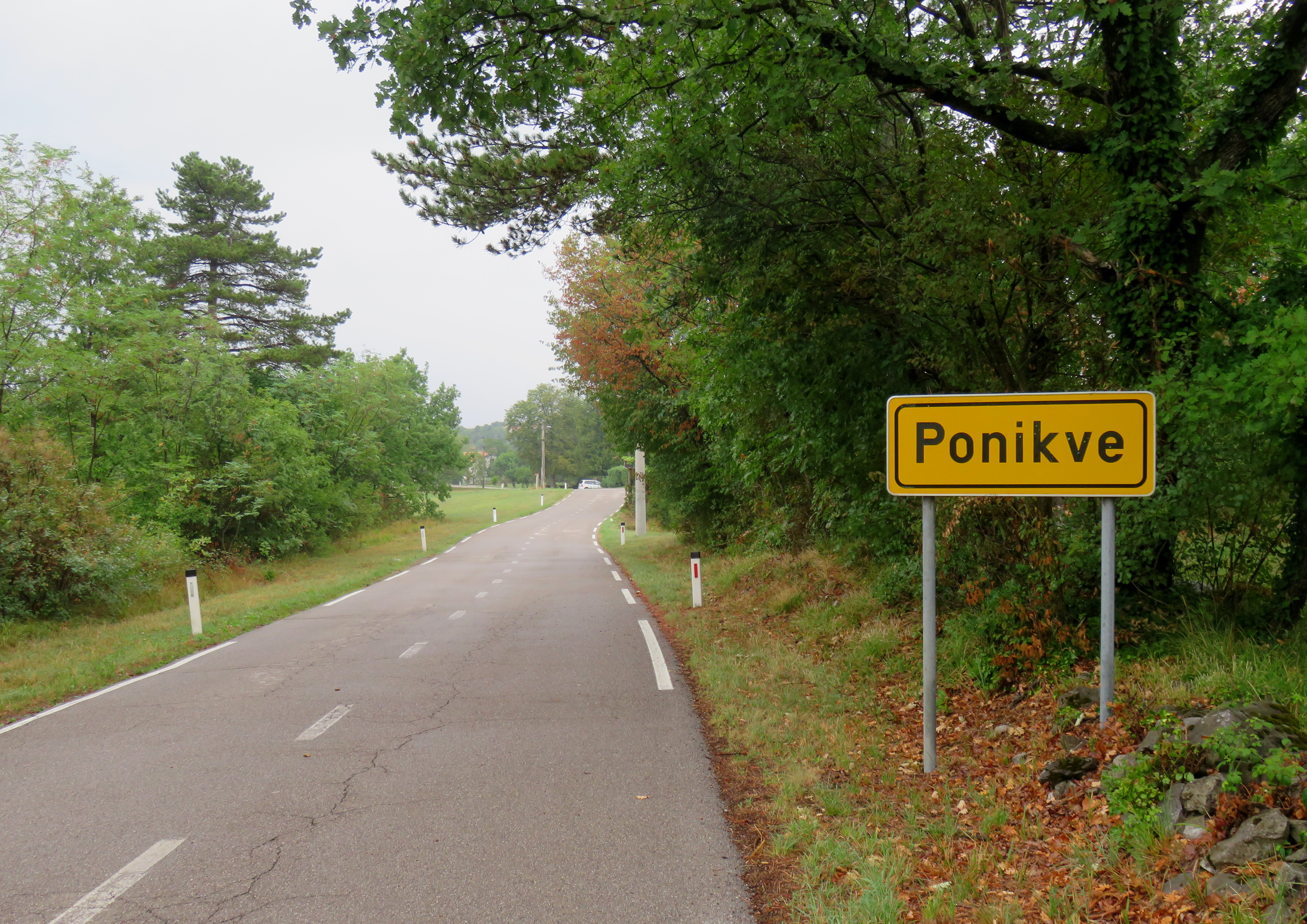

- Location in Slovenia
- Coordinates: 45°47′16.94″N 13°51′48.22″E
- Country: Slovenia
- Traditional region: Littoral
- Statistical region: Coastal–Karst
- Municipality: Sežana

Area
  - Total: 4.57 km^{2} (1.76 sq mi)
- Elevation: 351.2 m (1,152 ft)

Population (2002)
  - Total: 116

Ponikve (pronounced [pɔˈniːkʋɛ]) is a village south of Štanjel in the Municipality of Sežana in the Littoral region of Slovenia.

== Name ==
The name Ponikve is a plural form derived from the word ponikva 'influent stream' or 'sinkhole' (into which such a stream disappears). In its plural form it refers to a gently rolling landscape consisting of the basins of an influent stream. Like other villages named Ponikve and similar names (e.g., Ponikva), it refers to a local landscape element.

== Notable people ==
Notable people that were born or lived in Ponikve include:

- Ciril Zlobec (1925–2018), poet, journalist, and politician
