= Šentjurij na Dolenjskem =

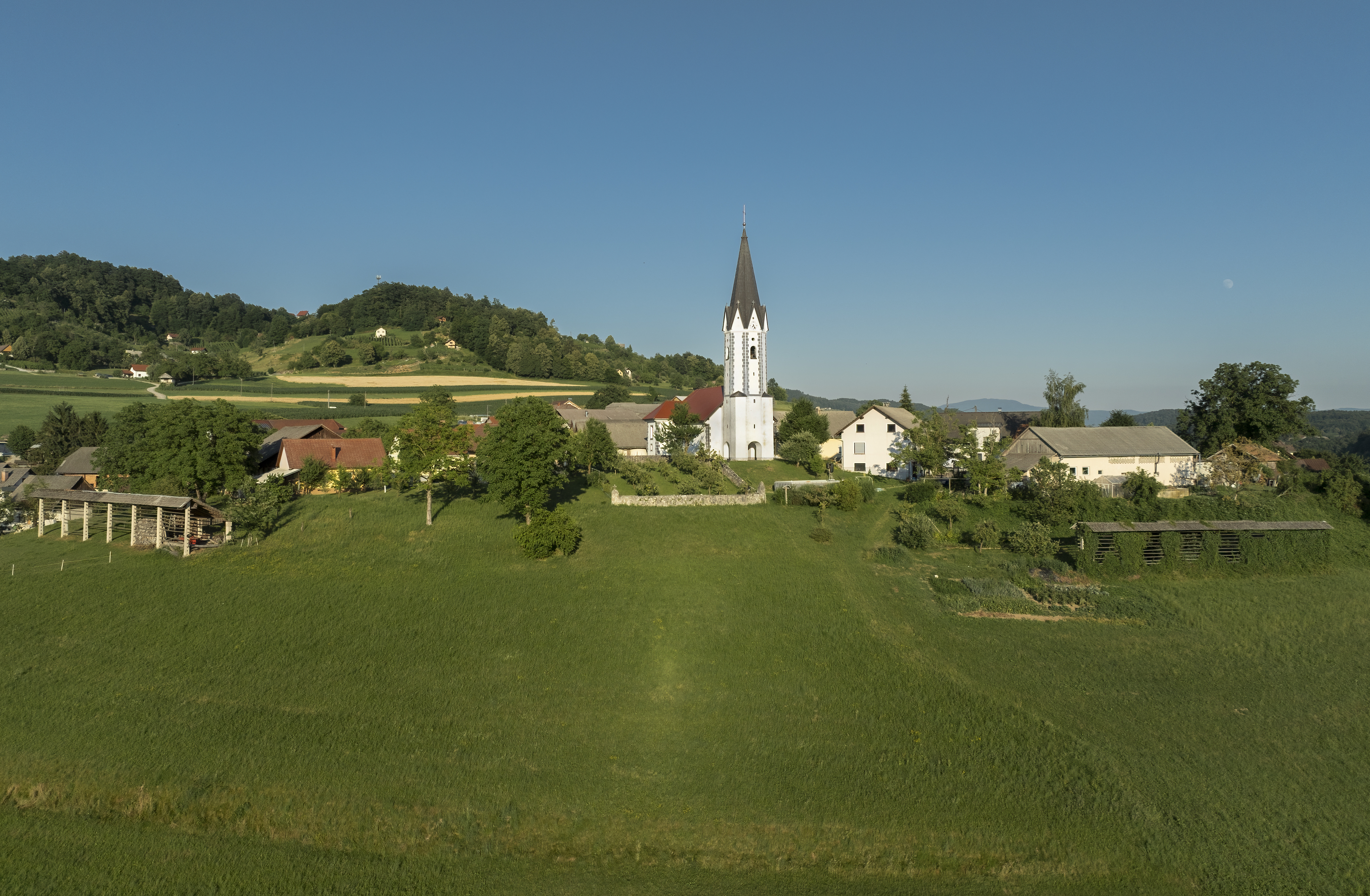

- Location in Slovenia
- Coordinates: 45°52′37″N 15°6′29.06″E
- Country: Slovenia
- Traditional region: Lower Carniola
- Statistical region: Southeast Slovenia
- Municipality: Mirna Peč

Area
  - Total: 0.94 km^{2} (0.36 sq mi)
- Elevation: 289.9 m (951 ft)

Population (2002)
  - Total: 73

Šentjurij na Dolenjskem (pronounced [ʃɛnˈtjuːɾii̯ na dɔˈleːnskɛm]) is a village in the Municipality of Mirna Peč in southeastern Slovenia. The area is part of the historical region of Lower Carniola. The municipality is now included in the Southeast Slovenia Statistical Region.

== Name ==
The name of the settlement was changed from Šent Jurij to Šentjurij na Dolenjskem in 1955.

== Church ==
The local church from which the settlement gets its name is dedicated to Saint George (Slovene: sveti Jurij) and belongs to the Parish of Mirna Peč. It dates to the late 16th century with some later adaptations.

== Notable people ==
Notable people that were born or lived in Šentjurij na Dolenjskem include:

- Tone Pavček (1928–2011), poet
