= Leonid Pitamic =

Slovene-Yugoslav lawyer, diplomat and academic (1885-1971)

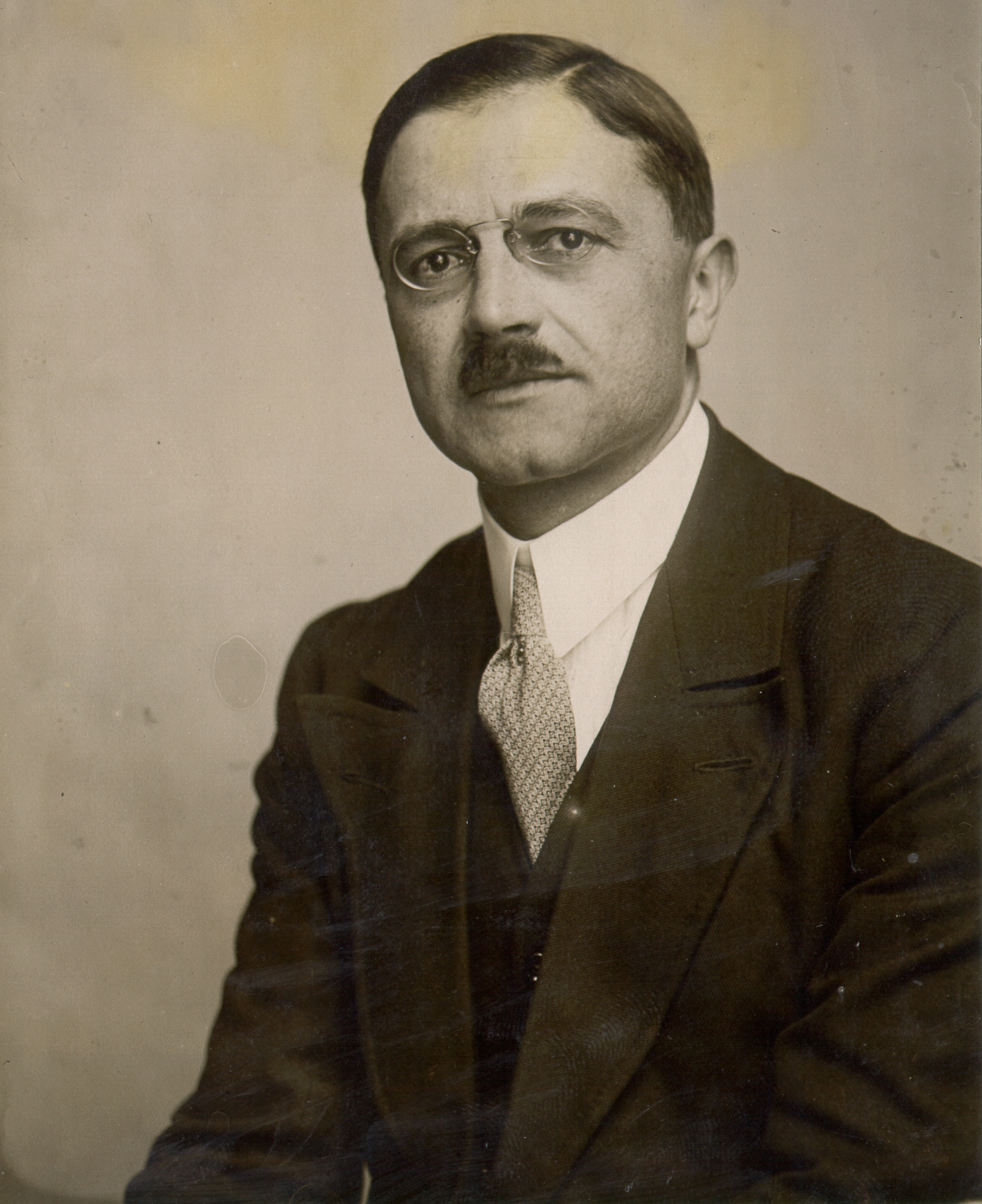
Pitamic in the 1920s

Leonid Pitamic (15 December 1885 – 30 June 1971) was a Slovene Yugoslav lawyer, philosopher of law, diplomat, and academic.

== Life ==
He was born in the Carniolan town of Postojna, then part of the Austro-Hungarian Empire, today in Slovenia. After finishing the classical lyceum in Gorizia and the Theresianum in Vienna, he enrolled in the University of Vienna, where he studied law. After graduation in 1908, he worked in the local branches of the state administration in Carniola, and later in the ministerial offices in Vienna. In 1915, he obtained habilitation in Austrian civil law, and in 1917 in philosophy of law. After the dissolution of the Austro-Hungarian Empire, he became a member of the administrative commission of the National Government of the short-lived State of Slovenes, Croats and Serbs.

In 1919, he served as a legal expert in the Yugoslav delegation at the Versailles Peace Conference. The same year, he was named professor at the newly formed University of Ljubljana. In September 1920, he was named as Secretary for Internal Affairs in the Regional Government for Slovenia. In December of the same year, he became the last president of the regional government before its dissolution. In the 1920s, he worked as the Yugoslav deputy delegate at the League of Nations, and between 1929 and 1935 as the ambassador of the Kingdom of Yugoslavia to the United States.

Between 1926 and 1927, he served as chancellor of the University of Ljubljana. After his return from the United States in 1935, he resumed teaching at the universities of Ljubljana and Zagreb. In the academic year 1940/41 was elected dean of the Faculty of Law and remained there as a professor until June 1952, when he finally retired.

In 1928, he became a member of the Yugoslav Academy of Sciences and Arts and in 1938 of the Academy of Sciences and Arts in Ljubljana (later renamed the Slovenian Academy of Sciences and Arts). In 1948 the Communist regime expelled him from the academy. His academy membership was reinstated after his death in 1971 and it was unofficially reinstated after 1988 and officially in 1996.

He died in Ljubljana and was buried in Žale cemetery.

== Work ==
Pitamic published several treatises on philosophy of law. He was the follower of the theories of legal positivism established by Hans Kelsen. His most important work is the volume Država (The State), published in 1927 and translated into English in 1933 under the title A Treatise on the State.
