= Intimism (poetic movement) =

Intimism (Slovene: intimizem) was a poetic movement that emerged in Slovenia in 1945, after the end of World War II. Its main themes were love, disappointment and suffering and the projection of poet's inner feelings onto nature. Its beginner was Ivan Minatti, who was followed by Lojze Krakar.

The climax of Intimism was achieved in 1953 with a collection of poetry titled Poems of the Four (Pesmi štirih), co-authored by Janez Menart, Ciril Zlobec, Kajetan Kovič and Tone Pavček. For all of them, it was their first collection.

A female counterpart to the four was Ada Škerl. A collection of her poetry, published in 1949 under the title Shadow in the Heart (Senca v srcu), was unacceptable in the post-war People's Republic of Slovenia. Contrary to the collective revolutionary worldview demanded at the time, it was subjective and didn't express trust in the future. Škerl was politically persecuted due to its publication.
