= Constitution of Slovenia =

National constitution

The Constitution of the Republic of Slovenia (Slovene: Ustava Republike Slovenije) is the fundamental law of the Republic of Slovenia.

== Writing and amendments ==
Preparation of the document began in August 1987 in the Slovene Writers' Association which published an informal draft, and after the DEMOS coalition won the majority in the Assembly of the Socialist Republic of Slovenia in April 1990, continued in the Assembly. The large part of the work was completed at Podvin Castle near Radovljica in August 1990 under the leadership of the lawyer Peter Jambrek. The Constitution was adopted by the National Assembly of the Republic of Slovenia on 23 December 1991.

Since its proclamation, the Constitution has been amended seven times, with four major amendments:

- In July 1997, the Spanish compromise legalised selling of real estate to foreigners as part of the convergence with the European Union.
- In July 2000, the proportional voting system was entered directly in constitution to avoid legal gap that threatened to happen after the National Assembly didn't approve the law about this issue according to somewhat unclear referendum results: three voting systems were proposed to people but none of them won the absolute majority of voters. In a disputed decision, the Constitutional Court of Slovenia ruled that if any law is to be passed, it is to be the law according to the option that got relative majority. In the political events that followed the time was running out and changing the constitution seemed like a good escape from status quo.
- In March 2003, the constitutional amendment was passed that enabled for the transmission of certain legal powers to international organisations. This would allow Slovenia to enter the European Union and NATO if it be the will of the people. A referendum on such was held on 23 March 2003.
- In June 2006, three articles of the constitution were amended to clarify the definition of Public Authority, to clarify transfer of state functions to municipal authorities, and to clarify how regions are established and authorized to carry out state functions. As of April 2020, these have not yet been established.

In December 2025, The Slovenia parliament voted 61 votes in favour and none against in the 90-member chamber for an constitutional amendment that enshrines the right to use cash in all banking and other legal transactions. becoming the third European Union country to constitutionally protect the right to pay in cash, following Hungary and Slovakia.

== Contents ==
The document is divided into ten chapters:

1. General Provisions
2. Human Rights and Fundamental Freedoms
3. Economic and Social Relations
4. Organisation of the State (under this provision, two of the seats in the National Assembly are reserved, one each to members of the country's Italian and Hungarian national communities)
5. Self-Government
6. Public Finance
7. Constitutionality and Legality
8. The Constitutional Court
9. Procedure for Amending the Constitution
10. Transitional and Final Provisions
