= Virmaše =

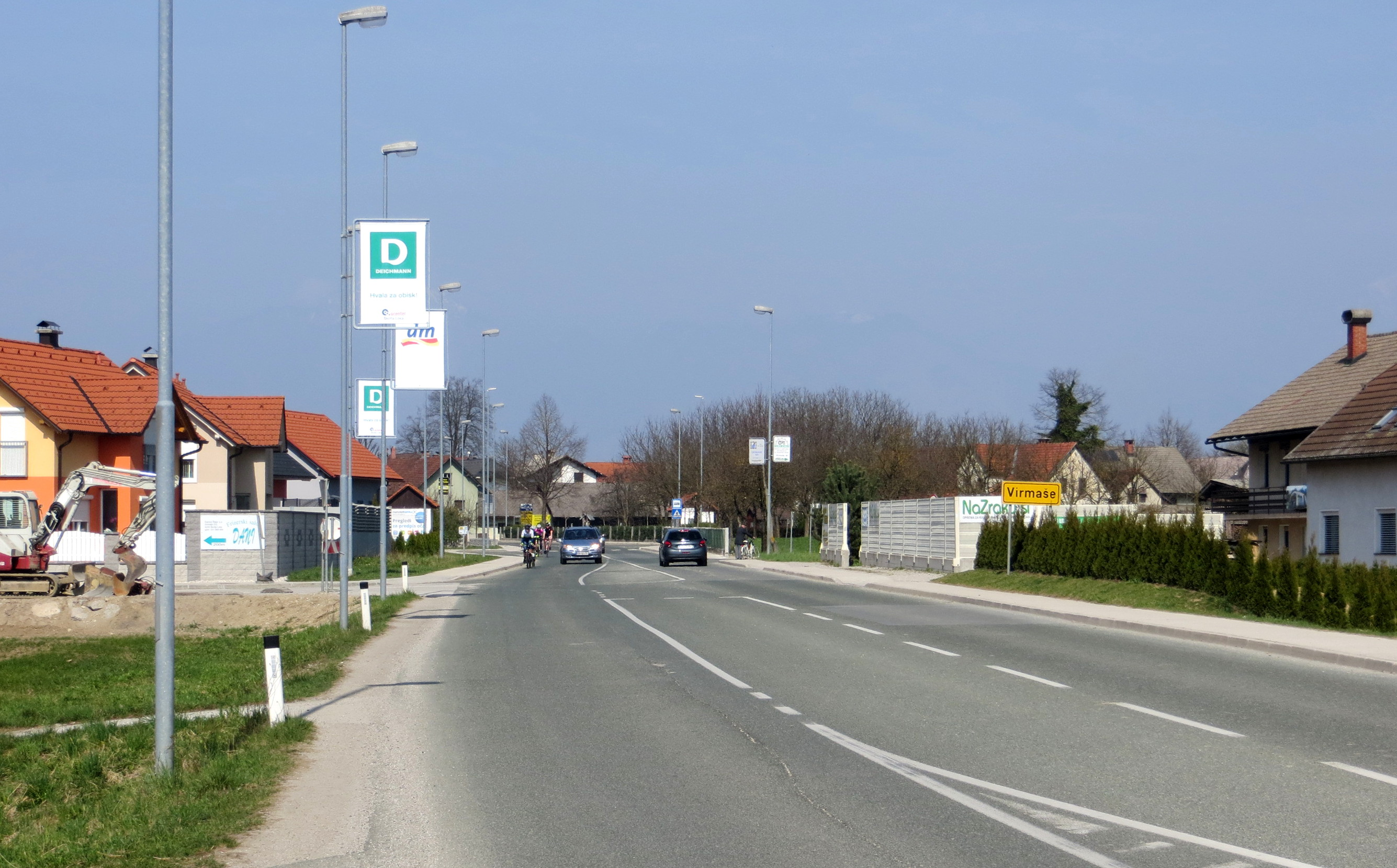

- Location in Slovenia
- Coordinates: 46°10′45.71″N 14°19′37.26″E
- Country: Slovenia
- Traditional region: Upper Carniola
- Statistical region: Upper Carniola
- Municipality: Škofja Loka

Area
  - Total: 1.65 km^{2} (0.64 sq mi)
- Elevation: 362.6 m (1,190 ft)

Population (2002)
  - Total: 512

Virmaše (pronounced [ˈʋiːɾmaʃɛ], in older sources sometimes also Virmaže; German: Ermern) is a settlement in the Municipality of Škofja Loka in the Upper Carniola region of Slovenia.

== Name ==
The settlement was attested in written sources in 1286 as Erenbrehen (and as Erinrich in 1291, Ernnechen and Ermbrechen before 1392, Ernwrehen in 1395, Emerhern in 1421, and Ermerhern in 1428). The Slovene name is a fused prepositional phrase, from *v Ermaše. The initial *Ver- changed to Vir- as a regular sound change in the local dialect. The root of the Slovene name is the accusative plural demonym *Erm(r)ašane, derived from the toponym *Ermrah. This was borrowed into Slovene from Middle High German *Eren-rîch, a compound originally meaning 'rich in honor'.

== Notable people ==
Notable people that were born or lived in Virmaše include:

- Gašper Porenta (1870–1930), painter
- France Mihelič (1907–1998), painter
- Stane Mihelič (1906–2005), Slavic specialist, education specialist, and beekeeper
- Viktor Volčjak (1913–1987), physician
