= Kred, Kobarid =

Kred
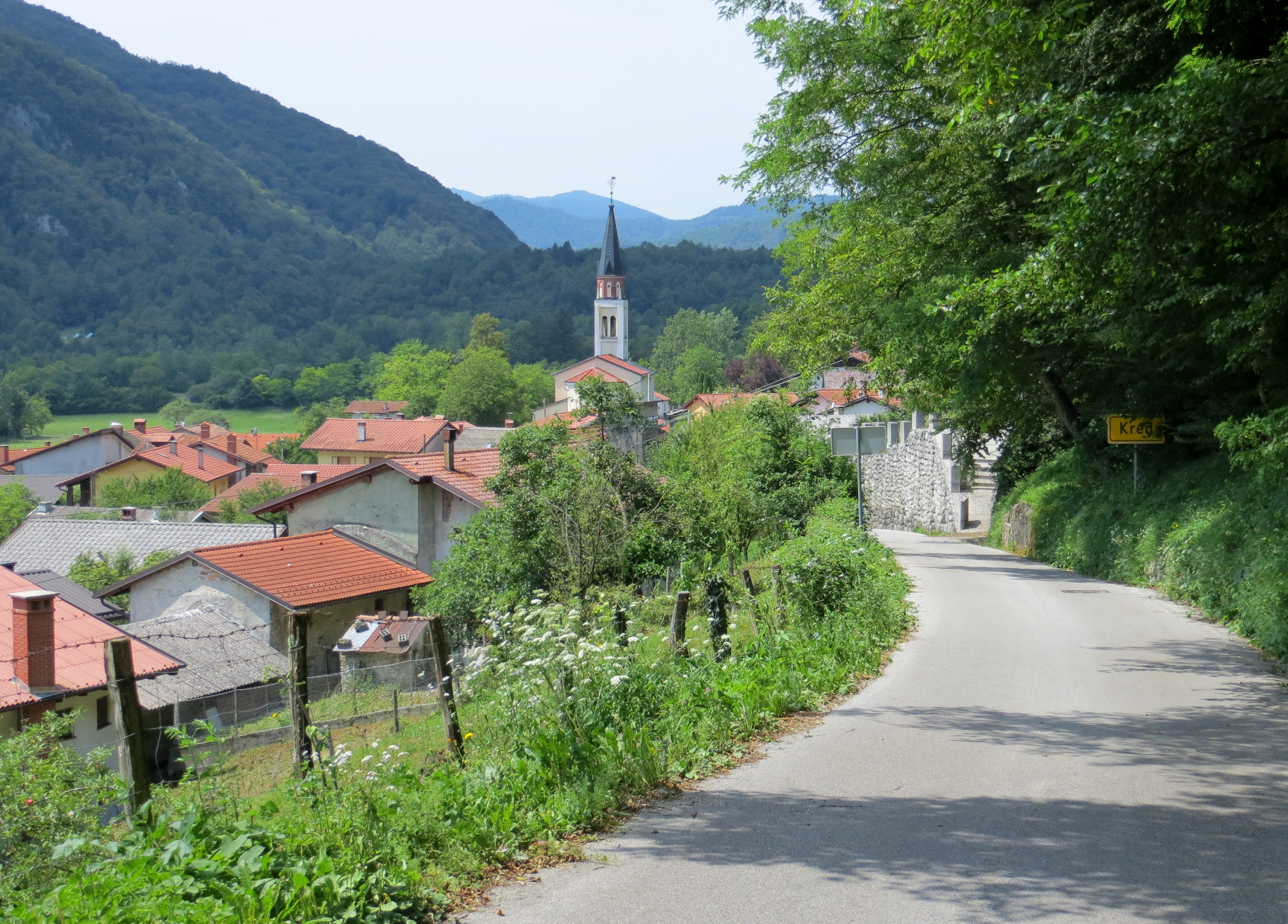

- Location in Slovenia
- Coordinates: 46°15′0.38″N 13°30′46.1″E
- Country: Slovenia
- Traditional region: Slovenian Littoral
- Statistical region: Gorizia
- Municipality: Kobarid

Area
  - Total: 2.28 km^{2} (0.88 sq mi)
- Elevation: 253.2 m (831 ft)

Population (2002)
  - Total: 128

Kred (pronounced [ˈkɾeːt]) is a village in the Municipality of Kobarid in the Littoral region of Slovenia. It is located in the Breginj Combe.

The parish church in the centre of the village is dedicated to Saint Nicholas.

== Notable people ==
Notable people that were born or lived in Kred include:

- Joža Lovrenčič (1890–1952), expressionist poet and educator
