= Žale =

Cemetery in Ljubljana, Slovenia

Coordinates: 46.067455°N 14.528424°E

Žale Central Cemetery Centralno pokopališče Žale
- Plečnik's monumental entrance to Žale
- Interactive map of Žale Central Cemetery; Centralno pokopališče Žale

Details
- Established: 1906
- Location: Bežigrad, Ljubljana
- Country: Slovenia
- Owned by: Žale Public Company
- Size: 375,000 square metres (93 acres)
- No. of interments: 150,000
- The Political Graveyard

UNESCO World Heritage Site
- Type: Cultural
- Criteria: iv
- Designated: 2021 (44th session)
- Part of: The works of Jože Plečnik in Ljubljana – Human Centred Urban Design
- Reference no.: 1643
- Region: Europe and North America

Žale Central Cemetery (Slovene: Centralno pokopališče Žale), often simply Žale, is the largest and the central cemetery in Ljubljana and Slovenia. It is located in the Bežigrad District and operated by the Žale Public Company.

== History ==
The ossuary of the victims of the First World War

The cemetery was built in 1906 behind Holy Cross Church. The first burial was performed in the same year on May 3, when the priest Martin Malenšek was transferred there from the old Navje cemetery.

During World War I, many of the fallen soldiers of all sides were buried in Žale. However, they were all Roman Catholics, while Protestants, Jews and Muslims were buried in Navje. In 1923 the authorities allowed Jews and Muslims to be buried in Žale too, but only on the exterior side of the cemetery wall.

In 1931 the new part of the cemetery (B part) opened. The Italian military cemetery was arranged there and many Italian soldiers were reburied from the A part. At the same year the Jewish part of the cemetery was arranged too, however it was separated from the main part by a fence. In 1939 the Ossuary of World War I Victims was built by architect Edvard Ravnikar, where 5,258 of the victims of this war as well as of the associated conflicts were later buried.

With the growth of Ljubljana the need for graves was growing too. In the 1930s the cemetery was proclaimed the central cemetery of Ljubljana and the planning of its expansion began. As the plans of the architect Ivo Spinčič failed to please the authorities, in 1936 a new design was commissioned from the architect Jože Plečnik. The new part, named Plečnik Žale Cemetery, was completed in 1942. It is a special architecture with monumental entrance with big arch, with different small chapels and some additional buildings.

Until 1968, only coffin burials were performed in Žale, but in that year the Žale Crematorium was built and the urn burials became available too.

In 1974 with the construction of the C part, the cemetery expanded again. The C part was designed by the architect Peter Kerševan. In 1988 the D part (Nove Žale, New Žale) designed by Marko Mušič opened.

As of 2008 the cemetery measures 375,000 m^{2} and comprises sections A, B, and C east of Tomačevo Street (Slovene: Tomačevska cesta), and section D west of the road. The fifth part of the cemetery, the Plečnik Žale, is not used for burials but for pre-burial ceremonies and associated cemetery activities. More than 150,000 people have been buried at Žale, about 2,000 of them prominent. The whole area of Žale has been proclaimed a cultural monument of Slovenia.

Since August 2021, the Plečnik Žale Cemetery has been inscribed as part of Plečnik's legacy on the UNESCO World Heritage List.

== Notable people ==
About 2,000 prominent people are buried in Žale cemetery, including:

- Fran Albreht, author, editor and politician
- Vera Albreht, poet
- Vladimir Bartol, writer
- Katja Boh, sociologist, politician and diplomat
- Ivan Cankar, author and political activist
- Fran Saleški Finžgar, writer and priest
- Rihard Jakopič, painter
- Davorin Jenko, composer, author of the music for the Serbian national anthem
- Edvard Kardelj, Communist leader
- Dragotin Kette, poet
- Edvard Kocbek, poet, essayist and politician
- Milan Komar, philosopher
- Janez Evangelist Krek, politician
- Dragotin Lončar, author, politician, historian
- Janez Menart, poet
- Josip Murn Aleksandrov, poet
- Lili Novy, poet
- Anton Peterlin, physicist
- Leonid Pitamic, jurist
- Jože Plečnik, architect
- Krista Povirk, catechist, poet, choir director
- Rudi Šeligo, writer, politician and playwright
- Dominik Smole, writer and playwright
- Matej Sternen, painter
- Gregor Strniša, poet
- Jernej Šugman, actor
- Marija Šuštar, ethnochoreologist and folklorist
- Josip Vidmar, literary critic
- Milan Vidmar, electrical engineer, chess player and theorist
- Angela Vode, politician, author, feminist activist
- Gregor Žerjav, politician
- Vitomil Zupan, writer
- Oton Župančič, poet
