= France Mihelič =

Slovene painter and illustrator (1907–1998)

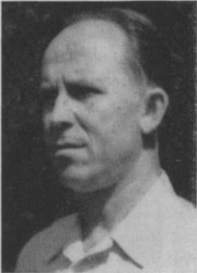
- France Mihelič in 1965
- Born: Frančišek Mihelič; 27 April 1907; Virmaše, Slovenia
- Died: 1 August 1998 (aged 91); Ljubljana, Slovenia
- Education: Academy of Fine Arts, Zagreb
- Known for: Painting and illustrating
- Notable work: Painting and illustration
- Awards: Prešeren Award; 1949 for the paintings Kolona v snegu and Vaška ječa Levstik Award; 1949 for Solzice; Levstik Award; 1951 for Najdihojca; Levstik Award; 1952 for Pestrna; Prešeren Award; 1955 for his graphic opus Levstik Award; 1956 for Štirje letni časi Prešeren Award; 1965 for the set and puppets for Sinja Ptica; Jakopič Award; 1978 for his lifetime achievement

France Mihelič (27 April 1907 – 1 August 1998) was a Slovene painter, one of the key figures in Slovene painting in the second half of the 20th century, known for his surrealist figurative paintings and prints.

Mihelič was born in Virmaše near Škofja Loka in 1907 and baptized Frančišek Mihelič. He studied art at the Zagreb Academy of Fine Arts between 1927 and 1931. He received the Prešeren Award three times, in 1949 for his paintings Kolona v snegu and Vaška ječa, in 1955 for his graphic opus and in 1965 for the set and puppets for a puppet performance of Sinja ptica (Bluebird) staged in 1964 at the Ljubljana Puppet Theatre.

He won the Levstik Award for his book illustrations four times: in 1949 for his illustrations of Prežihov Voranc's book Solzice (Lilies of the Valley), in 1951 for Fran Levstik's Najdihojca, in 1952 for France Bevk's Pestrna (Child Minder) and in 1956 for Mira Mihelič's Štirje letni časi (The Four Seasons).

In 1978 he also won the Jakopič Award for his lifetime achievement in painting.

He was married to the writer and translator Mira Mihelič.
