= Lojze Krakar =

Slovene poet, translator, editor, literary historian and essayist

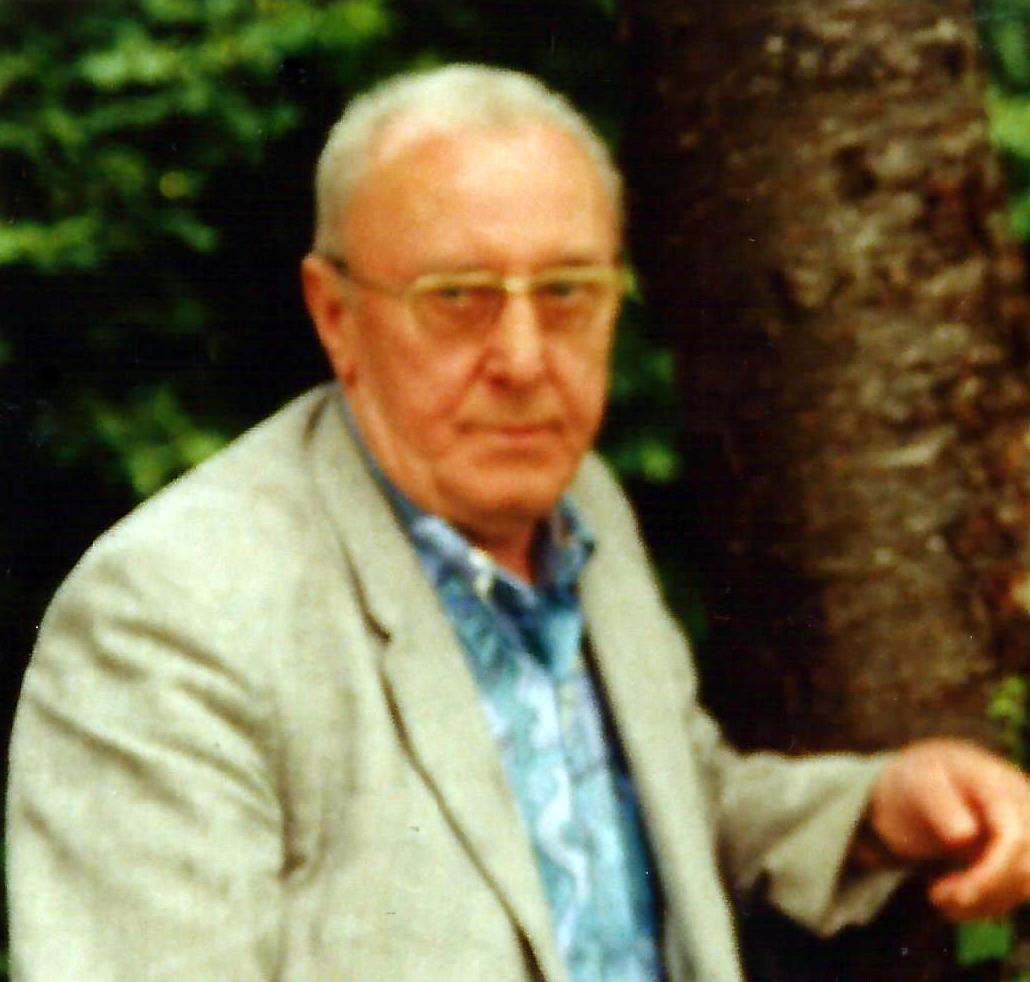
- Lojze Krakar
- Born: 21 February 1926; Semič, Kingdom of Yugoslavia (now in Slovenia)
- Died: 24 December 1995 (aged 69); Ljubljana, Slovenia
- Occupations: Poet; translator; editor; literary historian; essayist
- Writing career
- Notable works: Goethe pri Slovencih, Cvet pelina, Nekje tam čisto na robu, Sonce v knjigi, Prišel je lev
- Notable awards: Levstik Award; 1962 Sonce v knjigi Prešeren Foundation Award; 1963 Cvet pelina Prešeren Award; 1977 Nekje tam čisto na robu Levstik Award; 1991 Prišel je lev
- Movement: Intimism

Lojze Krakar (21 February 1926 – 24 December 1995) was a Slovene poet, translator, editor, literary historian, and essayist. He also wrote poetry for children.

Krakar was born in Semič in White Carniola in 1926. He studied Slavic languages and literature at the University of Ljubljana and graduated in 1954 and obtained a doctorate from the Frankfurt Goethe University in 1970. He worked as a lecturer, editor, and translator.

In 1963 he won the Prešeren Foundation Award for his poetry collection Cvet pelina (The Flower of the Woodworm). In 1977 he was awarded the Grand Prešeren Award for his poetry collection Nekje tam čisto na robu (Somewhere There Right on the Edge) He won the Levstik Award twice, in 1962 for his book of poetry for children Sonce v knjigi (The Sun in a Book), and in 1991 for his story in verse Prišel je lev (The Lion Arrived).
