= Mira Mihelič =

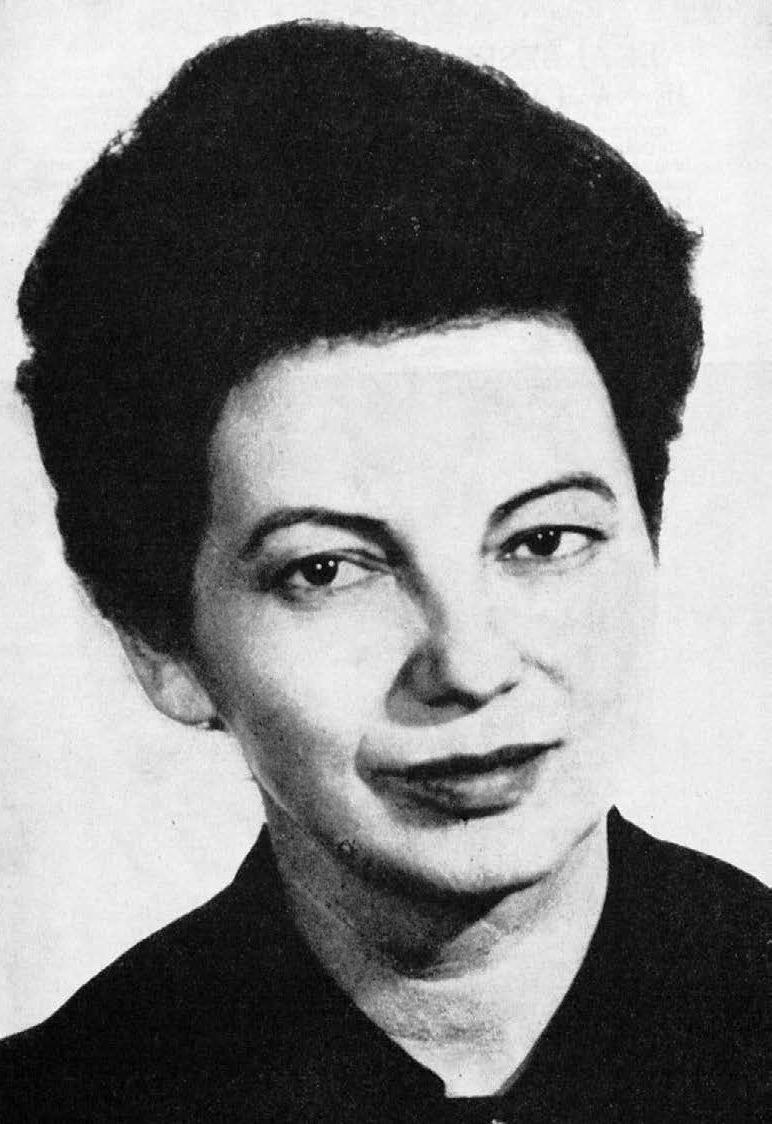
- Born: 14 July 1912; Split, then Austria-Hungary (now in Croatia)
- Died: 4 September 1985 (aged 73); Ljubljana, Slovenia
- Occupation: Writer
- Spouse(s): France Mihelič, painter
- Writing career
- Notable awards: Sovre Prize; 1963; Prešeren Award; 1983

Mira Mihelič, also known as Mira Kramer Puc (14 July 1912 – 4 September 1985) was a Yugoslav writer and translator.

== Biography ==
Mira Mihelič was born in Split on 14 July 1912, then Austria-Hungary (now in Croatia) as Mira Kramer. She went to school in Ljubljana and studied law for a while. She then became a professional writer and translator, one of the most noted Slovene literary figures of the 20th century. She was a longtime member of Slovene and international writers' societies, serving as president of the Slovene Writers' Association and Slovene PEN from 1973 also vice-president of International PEN. It was largely due to her efforts that international meetings organised by Slovene PEN began, an annual event that continues to date. She died in Ljubljana in 1985.

== Work ==
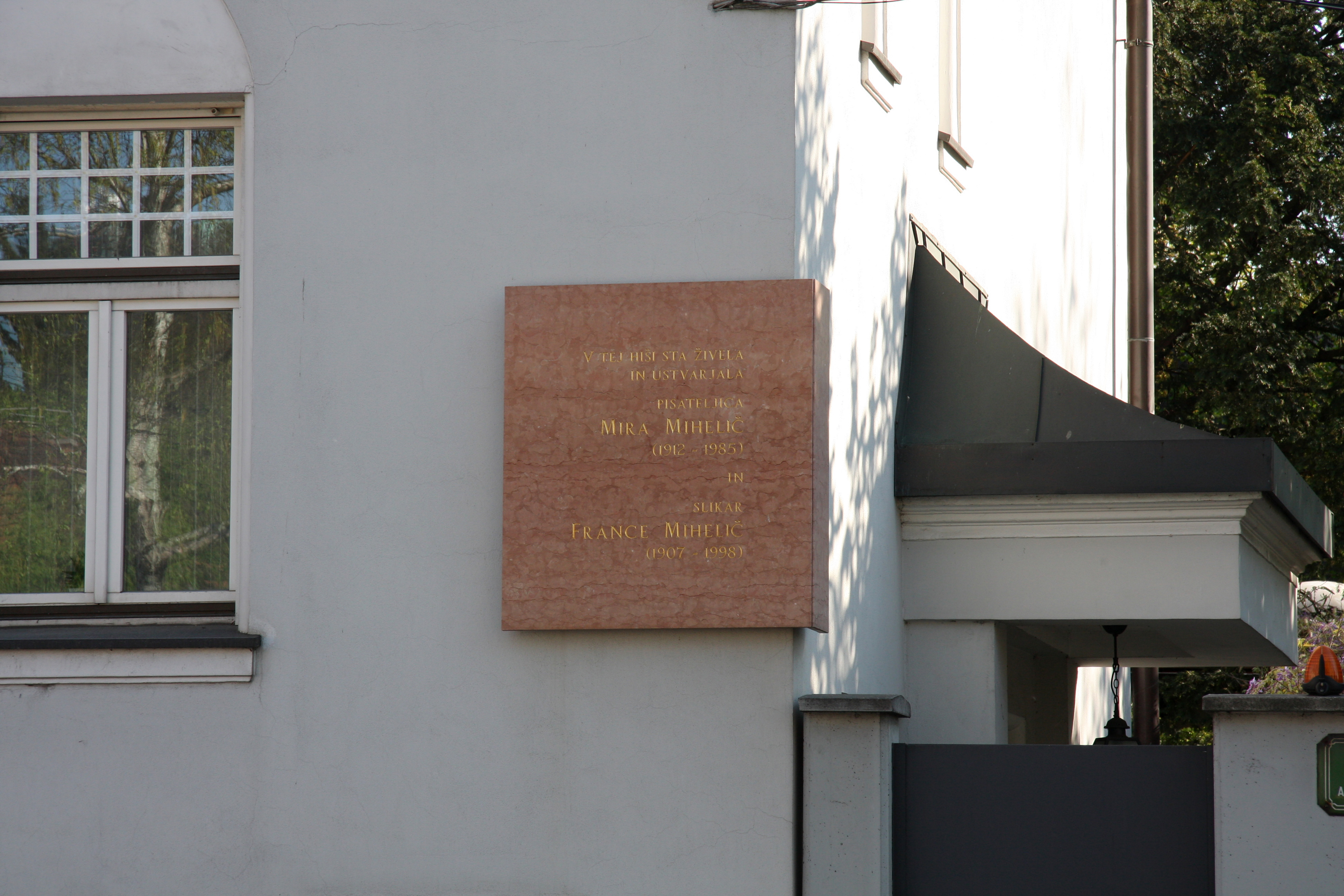
The plaque at the house in Ljubljana where Mira and France Mihelič lived and created

Mihelič's first novels Obraz v zrcalu (Face in the Mirror) (1941) and Tiha Voda (Quiet Waters) (1942) are descriptions of life in the comfortable world and aristocratic atmosphere of family traditions where a culture of fairly earned wealth, respect and pride prevails. She then soon discovered her own personal view of the descriptive world of literature in which she juxtaposes respect with irony, enthusiasm with repulsion, class allegiance with attempts to escape from it etc. Her characters are torn between traditions, respect, controlling their feelings on the one side and lust and ambition on the other with love, intrigue, political power and wealthy playing a key role. A special place is given to the emancipated and independent modern woman rebelling against the traditional devoted role of women of her mother and grandmother's generation in favour of emotional fulfilment, though this does not necessarily mean the idealisation of women. An example of this is the heroine of her 1959 novel April, taking place in the first months of the Second World War. In Stolpnica osamelih žensk (1969) and Vrnite se, sinovi (1972), she further develops the irony in her descriptions of characters and gestures. Tujec v Emoni (1978) and Cesta dveh cesarsjev (1981) are historical novels about intrigues in ancient Emona and a love story at the time of the Congress of Laibach respectively. Her final novel Ure mojih dni (1985), is a memoir. She also wrote novels for younger readers such as Pridi, moj mili Ariel (1965) and Puhkova kresna noč (1972). In 1963 she was awarded the Sovre Prize for her Slovene translations of the William Faulkner's Light in August, Thomas Wolfe's Look Homeward, Angel, and Charles Dickens's The Pickwick Papers. In 1983, she won the Prešeren Award for lifetime achievement.

She was married to the painter France Mihelič.

== Selected works ==
- April (1959)
- Vrnite se, sinovi (Return, my Sons) (1972)
- Plamen in dim (Flma and Smoke) (1973)
- Pridi, moj mili Ariel (Come, My Gentle Ariel) (1965)
- Tujec v Emoni (A Stranger in Emona) (1978)
- Cesta dveh cesarjev (The Road of Two Emperors) (1981)
- Svet brez sovraštva (A World without Hatred) (1945) play
- Operacija (Operation) (1950) play
- Ure mojih dni (The Hours of my Days) (1985)
