= Tone Pavček =

Slovene poet, translator and essayist

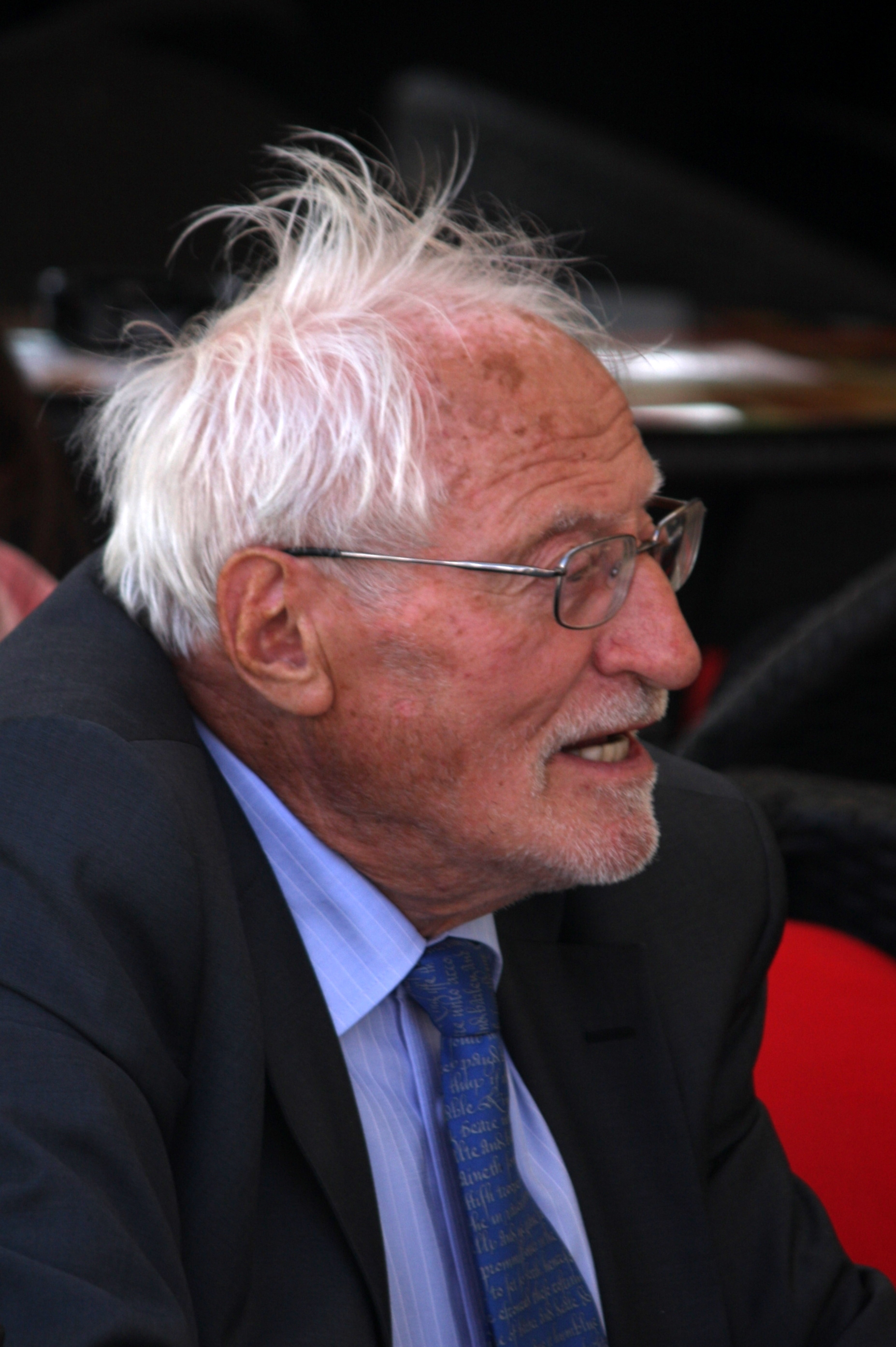
- Born: 29 September 1928; Šentjurij near Mirna Peč, Kingdom of Serbs, Croats and Slovenes
- Died: 21 October 2011 (age 83); Ljubljana, Slovenia
- Occupations: poet, translator
- Children: Saša Pavček, Marko Pavček (deceased since 1979)
- Writing career
- Period: first post-war generation
- Genres: lyrical, narrative, children and satirical poetry
- Notable work: Poems of the Four
- Notable awards: Sovre Award; 1979; Prešeren Award; 1986; Veronika Award; 2007 for Ujedanke: obrazi naše vsakdanjosti
- Literary movement: Intimism

Tone Pavček (pronounced [ˈtoːnɛ ˈpaːu̯tʃək]; 29 September 1928 – 21 October 2011) was one of the most influential Slovene poets, translators, and essayists from the first post-war generation. He published numerous collections of poetry, well received by readers and critics alike. He also translated a number of Russian works into Slovene.

== Biography ==
=== Early life ===
Tone Pavček was born on 29 September 1928 at Šentjurij in southeastern Slovenia. He attended the first grade of elementary school in Mirna Peč, but was soon sent to a boarding school in Ljubljana. There he graduated from a classical high school, and went on to study law, receiving a bachelor's degree in 1954, although he never performed legal services.

=== Professional career ===
In 1955 Pavček started working as journalist for the daily newspapers Ljubljanski dnevnik (Ljubljana Daily) and Ljudska pravica (People's Justice). In 1958 he worked as a journalist and later a programme director at RTV Slovenia, a position he held until 1972. In the late 1960s he was involved in the Slovenization of the national television, taking part in productions of well-received children's series such as Bratovščina sinjega galeba and Erazem in potepuh, the notable series for the general public Mali oglasi and Dekameron, and a memorable television film Andrej Hieng, gluhi mož na meji.

From 1972 to his retirement in 1990, he was editor-in-chief of the Cankarjeva Založba press, a major publisher at the time in Slovenia.

For a period of four years, starting in 1963, he was also an art director for the Slovenian Youth Theatre in Ljubljana. He presided over the Slovenian Writers Association from 1979 to 1983.

=== Political engagement ===
From 1986 to 1990, Pavček was a member of the National Assembly. He was also a member of a working group of the Slovene Writers' Association and Slovenian Sociological Association that created the basis for the first Slovenian constitution, today referred to as the ”Writers' Constitution”. It was published in 1988 in the Journal for Critique of Science, for Imagination and New Anthropology. Pavček took part in a public rally on Congress Square on 8 May 1989, where he read the May Declaration, the first public document demanding Slovenia's independence from Yugoslavia.

=== Late life ===
In 1990 Pavček retired and retreated from public life. He remained a frequent guest at literary and cultural events, visiting libraries, schools, and other public institutions. In 1996 he became a UNICEF Goodwill Ambassador, and in 2001 a member of the Slovenian Academy of Sciences and Arts. He was awarded the Golden Order for Merits of the Republic of Slovenia in 2009.

Tone Pavček died on 21 October 2011, at the age of 83 in Ljubljana. He was buried with military honors in Žale cemetery.

== Writing ==
Throughout his life, he was devoted to literature as poet, author of children's books and translator. From his first published poems in Pesmi štirih (Poems of the Four, 1953) to his final pages of Angeli (Angels, 2012) his poetry is entwined with vitalism and positive attitudes towards life. His poetry for children gained a wide audience due to its original fairy-tale motifs, integrating fantasy and folk elements. Especially important are his translations of Russian literature.

As a highly prolific writer, Pavček's work was recognized by a number of institutions. For the contribution to children's literature he was a three-time recipient of the Levstik Award (1958, 1961, 2005), and two-time nominee for the Hans Christian Andersen Award (2010, 2012). He received the Prešeren Fund Award (1965) and Grand Prešeren Award (1986) for his collections of poems Ujeti ocean (Trapped Ocean) and Dediščina (Heritage). For the book Ujedanke: obrazi naše vsakdanjosti he received the Veronika Award (2007). His translations were recognized with the Sovre Award in 1979.

=== For adults ===
Pavček published his first poem, "Sonet Ivanu Cankarju" (A Sonnet to Ivan Cankar) at the age of 18 in the contemporary youth literary magazine Mladinska revija. His first collection of poems, Pesmi štirih (Poems of the Four), co-authored by Kajetan Kovič, Ciril Zlobec, and Janez Menart, was published in 1953. It marks a significant shift to intimism in the Slovene poetry tradition of the 20th century. In his next collections, Ujeti ocean (Trapped Ocean, 1964) and Poganske hvalnice (Pagan Hymns, 1976), his lyrical expression remains vitalistic, idolizing nature and the countryside.

His poetic development reached its peak in his two collections of poems entitled Dediščina (Heritage, 1983) and Goličava (Wasteland, 1988). Touched by tragic death of his son, he discusses the questions of life and death, identifying an individual as well as community in the process. His works entitled Upocasnitve (Slow Downs, 1998), Darovi (Gifts, 2005), and Ujedanke (2006) mark a return to his native Lower Carniola, where he was born, and Slovene Istria, where he resided.

The collection of poems Angeli (Angels, 2012), which he finished on his deathbed and was published posthumously, received a great public and critical acclaim, making it the best selling book in Slovenia in 2012.

=== For children ===
In his numerous fairy tales, picture books, and verses, Pavček's children's poetry is extremely popular with younger readers. Through words and rhythm, sparkling with wit and optimism, he is able to communicate to his readers on a personal level, inviting them to relive their own experiences.

One of his best-known children's books is Jurij Muri v Afriki: o fantu, ki se ni maral umivati (Jurij Muri in Africa: About Boy Who Didn't Like to Wash, 1958), which had three sequels: the last one entitled Jurij Muri po Sloveniji (Juri Muri around Slovenia) in 2011.

=== Translations ===
Pavček is notable for translations of his contemporaries, especially the Russian poets Sergei Yesenin, Vladimir Mayakovsky, Anna Akhmatova, Boris Pasternak, Marina Tsvetaeva, and Nikolay Zabolotsky.
