= Kajetan Kovič =

Slovene poet, writer, translator and journalist

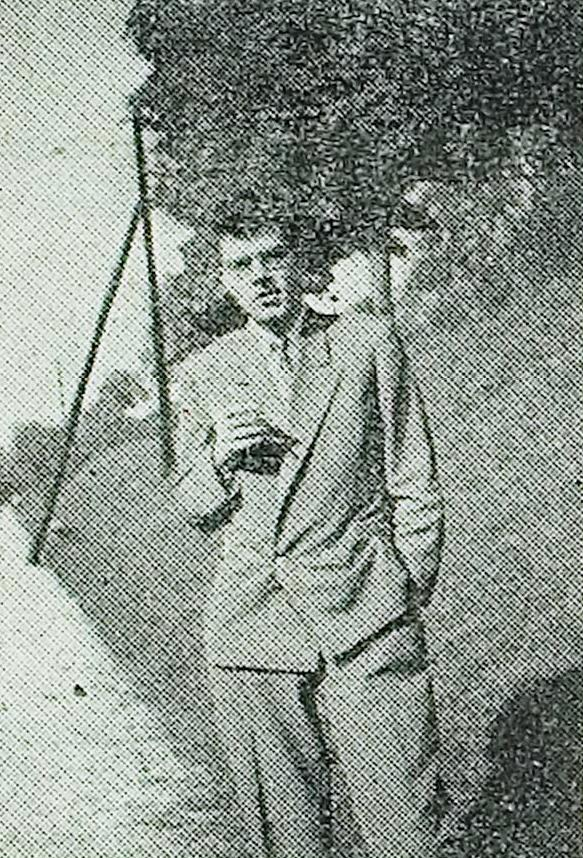
- Born: 21 October 1931; Maribor, Kingdom of Yugoslavia (now in Slovenia)
- Died: 7 November 2014 (aged 83); Ljubljana, Slovenia
- Occupations: poet, writer, journalist
- Writing career
- Notable works: Pesmi štirih, Ogenjvoda, Labrador, Ne bog ne žival, Moj prijatelj Piki Jakob, Maček Muri
- Notable awards: Prešeren Award; 1978 for his poetry collection Labrador; Jenko Award; 1993 for his poetry collection Sibirski cirkus
- Literary movement: Intimism

Kajetan Kovič (21 October 1931 – 7 November 2014) was a Slovene poet, writer, translator, and journalist. In 1978, he received the Prešeren Award, the highest artistic award in Slovenia, for his poetry collection Labrador.

== Life ==
Kovič was born in Maribor in 1931 and spent his childhood in the small town of Poljčane and Hrastje–Mota near Radenci in eastern Slovenia. He graduated from high school in Maribor and received a bachelor's degree in comparative literature from the University of Ljubljana in 1956. He died on 7 November 2014.

== Career ==
Kovič started writing poetry in high school, and he published his first poetry in 1948. He was best known for his poems and he wrote several bestselling children's books. Kovič also wrote political poetry, such as a poem in honor of Josip Broz Tito. He established himself as a translator of German, French, Czech, Hungarian, Croatian, Serbian, and Russian poetry into Slovene. He also translated the poems that France Prešeren wrote in German into Slovene. His poem Maček Muri (Muri the Tomcat) may be the best-known children's poem in Slovene, with an iconic picture book that has not gone out of print for more than fifty years and a popular musical adaptation.

== Awards and recognition ==
Kovič won the Prešeren Foundation Award in 1967 for his poetry collection Ogenjvoda (Fire-Water) and later the Grand Prešeren Award in 1978 for his poetry collection Labrador. In 1993, he received the Jenko Award from the Slovene Writers' Association for his poetry collection Sibirski Cirkus (Siberian Cycle). Two years later, he was made a member of the Slovenian Academy of Sciences and Arts.

== Poetry collections ==
- Utonil bi (I Would Drown, 1948)
- Pesmi štirih (Poems of the Four, 1953) co-authored with Janez Menart, Ciril Zlobec and Tone Pavček
- Prezgodnji dan (The Earliest Day, 1956)
- Korenine vetra (The Roots of the Wind, 1961)
- Ogenjvoda (Firewater, 1965)
- Vetrnice (Whirligig, 1970)
- Mala čitanka (Small Reader, 1973)
- Pesmi (Poems, 1973)
- Labrador (1976)
- Dežele (Lands, 1988)
- Poletje (Summer, 1990)
- Letni časi (The Seasons, 1992)
- Sibirski ciklus in druge pesmi raznih let (The Siberian Cycle and Other Poems of Various Years, 1992)
- Lovec (Hunter, 1993)
- Glas (Voice, 1998)
- Vrt (Garden, 2001)
- Kalejdoskop (Kaleidoscope, 2001)
- Pesmi (Poems, 2003)
- Vse poti so (All Paths Are, 2009)

== Prose ==
- Ne bog ne žival (Neither God nor Beast, 1965)
- Tekma ali kako je arhitekt Nikolaj preživel konec tedna (The Race, or How the Architect Nicholas Spent His Weekend, 1970)
- Iskanje Katarine (Searching For Catherine, 1987)
- Pot v Trento: prizori iz navadnega življenja Franca M. (Voyage into the Trenta Valley: Scenes from the Ordinary Life of Franc M., 1994)
- Profesor domišljije: ljubljanska zgodba (The Professor of Imagination: A Tale of Ljubljana, 1996)
- Jutranji sprehajalec (The Morning Perambulator, 2005)
- Sled sence zarje (A Trace of the Shadow of Dawn, 2006)
- Mala nebesa (Small Heavens, 2008)

== Children's books ==
- Franca izpod Klanca (Francine from below the Steep Hill, 1963)
- Zlata ladja (The Golden Ship, 1969)
- Moj prijatelj Piki Jakob (My Friend Piki Jacob, 1972)
- Maček Muri (Muri the Tomcat, 1975)
- Zgodnje zgodbe (Early Tales, 1978)
- Križemkraž (Crisscross, 1980)
- Zmaj Direndaj (The Dragon Direndaj, 1981)
- Pajacek in punčka (The Puppet and the Little Girl, 1984)
- Križemkraž: zgodnje pesmi, zgodnje zgodbe in še malo mačje godbe (Crisscross: Early Poems, Early Tales, and a Bit of Cat Music, 1991)
- Mačji sejem (Cats' Fair, 1999)
