= Janez Menart =

Slovene poet

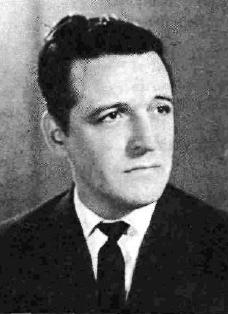
- Born: September 29, 1929; Maribor, Kingdom of Serbs, Croats and Slovenes
- Died: January 22, 2004 (aged 74); Ljubljana, Slovenia
- Occupations: poet, translator
- Spouse: Tonka Menart
- Children: one daughter: Barbara Menart Senica
- Writing career
- Period: first post-war generation
- Genres: lyrical, narrative, and satirical poetry
- Notable works: Poems of the Four, First Autumn, Newspaper Verse, White Fairytale, Traffic Lights of the Youth, Under the Plague Spot, Medieval Ballads, translations of classical French and English poetry and plays
- Notable awards: Award of the City of Ljubljana; 1965 Translation of Shakespeare's sonnets Sovre Award; 1975 Reworkings of poems by Robert Burns and Lord Byron; Župančič Award; 1978 collection of poems Under the Plague Spot; Prešeren Award; 1979 (declined) collections and translations of poetry Sovre Award; 1988 Collected works of François Villon
- Literary movement: Intimism

Janez Menart (29 September 1929 – 22 January 2004) was a Slovene poet, best known for his Intimist poetry. He translated a number of classic French and English poetry and drama works into Slovene, including Shakespeare's sonnets.

== Biography ==
Menart was born in Maribor. His mother was a theatre actress. She soon fell ill, so the family moved back to Ljubljana. His father worked as an emergency medical technician and committed suicide when Janez was seven years old. His mother died eight years later.

Due to poor social circumstances Janez and his older sister lived almost from the beginning of schooling in the boarding schools. Janez was able to enter grammar school only because he won one of the four scholarships offered by Drava Banovina in 1940. Having finished it he attended the Faculty of Philosophy at the University of Ljubljana where he graduated in Slovene philology and in comparative literature studies.

After compulsory military service he was at first a publisher's reader, then a stage director and finally a director of puppet section at Triglav film. In that time he also married and got a daughter. Since 1963, when he left film, he earned his money by writing and translation.

Then he employed himself as the editor of drama editorial board at RTV Ljubljana. Due to political circumstances he was later degraded to a stage director and in the final three years he worked as a translator for current needs. In 1979 he decided to leave his job and employ himself as a programme leader of the book sales club Svet knjige at Mladinska knjiga. He stayed there till his retirement in 1990.

He died in Ljubljana due to a hospital infection.

== Work ==
Janez Menart was one of the most popular Slovene poets in the second half of the 20th century. Over four hundred of his individuals poems have been translated to about 25 foreign languages and over half of these translations were published in independent editions. Over one hundred of his poems and chanson lyrics have been set to music, some of them have also been recorded on cassettes and discs.

Menart began seriously writing songs when he was 15 and had first of them published in the last two years of attending grammar school. He gradually published them in a continuously larger number of literary journals and by radio. His career of a prominent literate began in 1953 when he published the collection Poems of the Four (Pesmi štirih) in collaboration with Kajetan Kovič, Tone Pavček and Ciril Zlobec. His poetry is traditionally confessional, the narration realistic and satirical while the form rests on traditional meter with romantic images and everyday reality. Also well known are his epigrams.

Menart complemented original poetry by translating foreign language literature. Slovenes have to thank him for, among others, the excellent translations of Shakespeare's Sonnets, Byron's, Burns's and Prévert's poetry and Villon's Collected Works. He also translated English Renaissance plays such as Volpone by Jonson and Doctor Faustus by Christopher Marlowe.

Although mainly known as a poet and translator, Menart also wrote scripts for puppet and documentary films and television plays. He was also the first in Slovenia to publish a CD audiobook, with his poems largely interpreted by him himself.

== In music ==
In 1975, his poem "Homeland" (Slovene: Domovina), translated by the Croatian poet Zvonimir Golob, was used as lyrics for the song "Domovina" sung by the Croatian rock and folk musician Drago Mlinarec.
