= Ciril Zlobec =

Slovene writer, translator, and politician

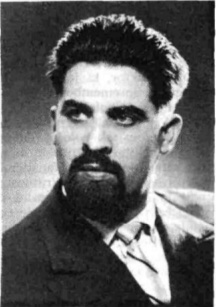
- Ciril Zlobec in 1969
- Born: 4 July 1925; Ponikve, Kingdom of Italy (now Slovenia)
- Died: 24 August 2018 (aged 93); Ljubljana, Slovenia
- Occupations: Poet; writer; journalist; translator; politician
- Writing career
- Notable works: Pesmi štirih, Najina oaza, Glas
- Notable awards: Prešeren Foundation Award; 1965 for his poetry collection Najina oaza Prešeren Award; 1982 for his poetry collection Glas; Veronika Award; 2000 for Samo ta dan imam
- Movement: Intimism

Ciril Zlobec (4 July 1925 – 24 August 2018) was a Slovene poet, writer, translator, journalist and former politician. He is best remembered for his poems, publishing several volumes of poetry in his lifetime. In 1990 he became a member of the Presidency of Slovenia at a critical time for Slovene independence.

== Life and career ==
Zlobec was born in 1925 in the village of Ponikve on the Karst Plateau in what was then the Julian March region of the Kingdom of Italy. He attended school in Gorizia and Koper. He was expelled from school in 1941 for writing poetry in Slovene, the use of which was strictly forbidden under the policies of Fascist Italianization. During the Second World War he was an activist for the Slovene Liberation Front and briefly joined the Partisans. After the war he completed his studies and graduated from the University of Ljubljana in 1953. He worked as a journalist and translator, publishing numerous collections of poetry as well as two novels. In 1989 he was made a member of the Slovenian Academy of Sciences and Arts.

He rose to public prominence in 1953, as one of the four co-authors of the collection of poetry called "The Poems of the Four" (Pesmi štirih). The collection marked a turning point in the Slovene post-war culture, as it represented a break with the hitherto imposition of Socialist realism as the sole style in literature. The other three poets who participated in the project were Kajetan Kovič, Janez Menart and Tone Pavček.

Zlobec won the Prešeren Foundation Award in 1965 for his poetry collection Najina oaza (Our Oasis) and the Grand Prešeren Award in 1982 for his poetry collection Glas (Voice).

In the 1970s and 1980s, he also served as the editor of the intellectual and cultural journal Sodobnost.

In 1990, Zlobec joined the Socialist Party of Slovenia and ran successfully for the Slovenian Presidency, an advisory body to the President of the Republic. He was considered a close ally of the President Milan Kučan.

After 1992, he retired from political life.

He was the father of the activist, author, translator and politician Jaša Zlobec.

== Poetry collections ==
- Pesmi štirih (1953) co-authored with Janez Menart, Kajetan Kovič and Tone Pavček
- Pobeglo otroštvo (1957)
- Ljubezen (1958)
- Najina oaza (1964)
- Pesmi jeze in ljubezni (1968)
- Čudovita pustolovščina (1971)
- Dve žgoči sonci (1973)
- Vračanja na Kras (1974)
- Kras (1976)
- Pesmi (1979)
- Glas (1980)
- Pesmi ljubezni (1981)
- Beseda (1985)
- Nove pesmi (1985)
- Rod (1988)
- Moja kratka večnost (1990)
- Ljubezen dvoedina (1993)
- Stopnice k tebi (1995)
- Skoraj himne (1995)
- Ti – jaz – midva (1995)
- Mojih sedemdeset (1995)
- Samo ta dan imam (2000)
- Čudež telovzetja (2004)

== Novels ==
- Moška leta našega otroštva (1962)
- Moj brat svetnik (1970)
- Spomin kot zgodba, autobiographical novel, (1998)

Preceded by Kole Čašule	President of the Association of Writers of Yugoslavia; 1985-1986	Succeeded by 1986-1988 office vacant Slobodan Selenić from 1988
