= List of Slovenian playwrights =

This is a list of Slovenian playwrights.

== B ==
- Peter Božič (1932–2009)

== C ==
- Ivan Cankar (1876–1918)

== Č ==
- Tone Čufar (1905–1942)

== F ==
- Fran Saleški Finžgar (1871–1962)

== J ==
- Drago Jančar (born 1948)
- Jože Javoršek (1920–1990)
- Dušan Jovanović (1939–2021)

== K ==
- Primož Kozak (1929–1990)
- Bratko Kreft (1905–1996)
- France Kunstelj (1914–1945)

== L ==
- Fran Levstik (1831–1887)
- Anton Tomaž Linhart (1756–1795)

== M ==
- Karel Mauser (1918–1977)
- Marija Mijot (1902–1994)
- Vinko Möderndorfer (born 1958)

== N ==
- Anton Novačan (1887–1951)
- Boris A. Novak (born 1953)

== P ==
- Tone Partljič (born 1940)
- Žarko Petan (1929–2014)
- Ivan Potrč (1913–1993)

== R ==
- Marjan Rožanc (1930–1990)

== S ==
- Dominik Smole (1929–1992)
- Gregor Strniša (1930–1987)

== Z ==
- Dane Zajc (1929–2005)

== Ž ==
- Oton Župančič (1878–1949)
