= Pirjevec =

Pirjevec is a Slovene surname, found mostly in the Slovenian Littoral and among Slovenes in the Italian provinces of Trieste and Gorizia.

Notable persons with this surname include:

- Alenka Pirjevec (born 1945), Slovene puppeteer
- Avgust Pirjevec (1887–1943), Slovene literary historian
- Dušan Pirjevec (1921–1977), Slovene literary historian and philosopher
- Jože Pirjevec (born 1940), Slovene historian
- Marija Pirjevec, literary historian
