= Serf (disambiguation) =

Serf refers to a person in a serfdom, a condition of debt bondage. Serf or Serfs may also refer to:

== People ==
- Monique Andrée Serf (1930–1997), French singer better known as Barbara
- Robert Serf, French automobile manufacture, and its eponymous owner
- Saint Serf (c. 500 – c. 583), a saint of Scotland

== Works ==
- Serf (film), 2019 Russian comedy film
- The Serfs (play), 1907 Slovene satirical play
- The Serfs, 1928 German silent drama film

== Other ==
- SERF, acronym for spin exchange relaxation-free, a type of magnetometer

== See also ==
- Surf (disambiguation)
- Sirf (film), 2008 Indian Hindi-language drama film
- JobSerf, former employment service and job search outsourcing (JSO) company
- LandSerf, geographic information system for editing, processing and visualizing spatial data
