= Petan =

Petan is a surname. Notable people with the surname include:

- Alex Petan (born 1992), Italian ice hockey player
- Nic Petan (born 1995), Canadian ice hockey player
- Žarko Petan (1929–2014), Slovene writer and director
