= See You in the Next War =

1980 film

- Directed by: Živojin Pavlović
- Written by: Živojin Pavlović; Vitomil Zupan
- Starring: Metod Pevec, Jožica Avbelj
- Cinematography: Tomislav Pinter
- Edited by: Olga Skrigin
- Release date: 4 February 1980
- Running time: 118 minutes
- Country: Yugoslavia
- Languages: Slovenian; German

See You in the Next War (Serbian: Довиђења у следећем рату, transliterated: Doviđenja u sledećem ratu, Slovene: Nasvidenje v naslednji vojni) is a 1980 Yugoslav war film directed by Živojin Pavlović. It competed in the Un Certain Regard section at the 1982 Cannes Film Festival.

The film's screenplay is based on the Vitomil Zupan's novel Menuet za kitaro (A Menuet for Guitar), published in 1975. Like the novel, the film takes place partially in Nazi-occupied Slovenia during World War II, and partially in Spain, where the main character, a former partisan, meets his former German adversary in a summer resort.

== Cast ==
- Jozica Avbelj
- Ivo Ban - Tujcko
- Hans Christian Blech
- Joze Horvat
- Zvone Hribar
- Boris Juh
- Barbara Levstik
- Metod Pevec
- Tanja Poberznik
- Milan Puzic
- Janez Starina
- Ruth Gassmann
- Maks Bajc
