= Hiša Marije Pomočnice =

1904 novel by Ivan Cankar

- Author: Ivan Cankar
- Language: Slovenian
- Publisher: Lavoslav Schwentner
- Publication date: 1904
- Publication place: Slovenia
- ISBN: 8-636-10635-4

Hiša Marije Pomočnice (The Ward of Mary Help of Christians) is a novel by the Slovenian author Ivan Cankar. It was first published in 1904 by Lavoslav Schwentner. The novel was reprinted in 1989, with earlier editions in 1956 by the Koper publisher Lipa, in 1999 by Karantanija (Klasiki collection), and in 2004 by DZS in the Slovenska zgodba series (Dnevnikova knjižnica, no. 5). It was translated into English in 1968 by Henry Leeming and published in 1976 under the title The Ward of Our Lady of Mercy.

The novel is set in a charity ward for girls with terminal illnesses. The individual girls and their often difficult families are the focus of the novel.

== Plot ==
The novel begins with Malči’s arrival at Hiša Marije Pomočnice, brought by her mother. The narrative is told through an omniscient narrator, who gradually shifts focus from Malči’s experience of the ward to the attitudes of the young patients toward life and death, the latter being a constant presence in the ward or hospice. We meet the bold Lojzka, the obliging Rezika, Tina, the oldest and most mature, the blind Tončka, the mysterious and solitary Katica, the quiet Pavla, the hunchbacked and robust Brigita, Minka, who dies soon after Malči’s arrival, and Sister Cecilija, a kind and compassionate figure who is the only adult the girls trust. In contrast, visitors to the ward are always portrayed as outsiders who do not belong to the sacred world of the House of Dying.

The girls are regularly visited by a countess with her attendants, who charitably distribute oranges and cookies and expect the patients to pray for their benefactors, though Lojzka feigns gratitude and mocks them behind their backs.

Sister Cecilija serves as the girls’ only true connection to the outside world, bringing them a canary named Hanzek, which they adore, but its peaceful existence ends due to a violent intrusion from the outside. Katica’s father, a large and dirty drunk who frightens all the girls, including his own daughter, approaches the canary, causing it to fly in panic toward the window, hit the glass, and die.

Sister Cecilija then brings a sparrow, which they name Anarchist because it is rebellious and cannot be tamed, persistently seeking an escape from the room. It hops against the window all night, crashing into it and falling until it is badly injured by morning, after which it is nearly dead and swept out. Cankar compares this to Tina, who sees the House as a morgue and, along with the prematurely seduced Brigita, is the only one longing for a different life. Realizing she will never live a normal life as a healthy woman, Tina attempts suicide. The next morning, she is taken from the room, but the girls, like the sparrow Anarchist, quickly forget her.

Cankar naturalistically describes the environments of Lojzka, Brigita, and Tončka, sparking criticism for allegedly hiding pornography under the guise of naturalism.

Lojzka’s parents commit adultery in her presence; her father even brings home a fourteen-year-old impoverished girl, gets her drunk, and abuses her (Cankar uses vivid imagery here); they also argue and physically fight but skillfully hide it in public, which Lojzka resents deeply.

Before arriving at Hiša Marije Pomočnice, Brigita lived with her parents and other workers in two modest rooms. They occasionally hold parties in the larger room where they get drunk, and men kiss Brigita’s mother and take her to the next room. When Brigita’s father stabs one of these men, her mother expels him; the lover returns after a few weeks, but the father never does. On Sundays, Brigita is left alone, and one of the workers seduces her.

Tončka’s father, a stern churchwarden, remarries after his wife’s death. With his new wife comes her daughter Lucija, who forces Tončka into homosexual acts. The father is unfaithful to his new wife, sexually harasses the maids, and neglects Tončka. Even when one of his acquaintances abuses her, he shows no compassion. The stepmother takes a minor lover and arranges for Tončka’s father to be imprisoned. Tončka is happy to be taken away but is reclaimed by her father after a year and a half, forcing her to leave Hiša Marije Pomočnice.

Malči’s mother is a private seamstress who works day and night. Malči has only a distant memory of when her mother was happy and planned a better future with a young gentleman who once stayed with them. Malči feels less and less sympathy for her mother and no desire to return home. During her short time in the ward, Malči matures and accepts her fate, not understanding why her mother cries at her deathbed.

We also observe reversed roles between the girls and their parents with the obliging Rezika, who wants to protect her father; the nearly immobile Katica, who comforts her mother and wipes her tears; and the dying Minka, who spends her last night compassionately reflecting on her deceased parents. Minka, having lived in the room for years, tells the girls about their predecessors and their final moments.

Another resident is the quiet and wise Jewish girl Pavla, visited by her mother with her daughters and son Edvard, whom Tina falls in love with and eagerly awaits. When Edvard one day visits with a young, beautiful girl, Tina despairs, realizing her fate is death, not love.

Among all the girls, the bold Lojzka stands out, unable to hide her aristocratic origins. She is arrogant and provocative, often teasing Tina about her feelings for Edvard. In a way, she represents the old life with its hypocrisy, envy, and ingratitude, though she too does not want to return home and always shares the gifts her parents bring with her roommates.

External visitors are generally depicted as selfish sinners or at least tormented and rejected individuals incapable of seeing the noble kingdom of beauty and purity that the room of St. Neža in Hiša Marije Pomočnice represents for the young patients. Here, they find a safe haven from the violent and cruel world they do not wish to return to.

The novel ends with Malči’s death. The girls await a spring outing but must wait for Malči to die first. Malči also anticipates a journey to a sunny land and hopes her mother, who long hoped for a different life, will come and join them. When her mother arrives at her deathbed, Malči is ready to travel to a better world. In her final delusions, she imagines traveling with the girls and her mother toward sunlight, where the hair of Jesus Christ, the bridegroom her soul eagerly awaits, already glistens.

== See also ==
- List of Slovenian novels
