= Alenka Pirjevec =

- Born: 5 July 1945 (age 81); Ljubljana
- Occupations: puppeteer, theatre director and actress
- Years active: 1968–present
- Parents: Dušan Pirjevec (father); Marjeta Vasič (mother)

Alenka Pirjevec is a puppeteer, theatre director and actress from Slovenia.

== Early life and education ==
Alenka Pirjevec was born on 5 July 1945 in Ljubljana, Slovenia, to Slovenian partisan, literary historian and philosopher Dušan Pirjevec and his wife, partisan co-fighter and university professor of the French language, Marjeta Vasič.

She attended primary school and classical gymnasium in Ljubljana where she graduated in 1964 and enrolled in the Academy of Theatre, Radio, Film and Television (AGRFT) in the department for play and theatre in 1965, where she finished three years and transferred for the fourth year to the Academy of Theatre in Belgrade and graduated with a diploma in 1969.

== Career ==
She continued living in Belgrade working part-time as an actress in the national theatre while also working as a translator from Slovene to Serbo-Croatian until 1973 when she returned to Ljubljana.

Upon return, she started working in the Puppet Theatre of Ljubljana in 1975 as actress and animator where she still works at (as of 2020). She held the position of artistic director in the seasons 1987/88 and 1988/89.

Falling in love with puppets she asked her senior to teach her animating puppets and performing with them. In spring of 1984, Alenka received a scholarship of the theatre and attended a six-week course named "Théâtre d'objets" under the guidance of Josef Krofta in the Institut International de la Marionnette in Charleville-Mézières, France.

In the season 1991/92 she received a scholarship from the ministry of culture in Slovenia and attended the international specialised course in technology of puppet creation in the National School Supérieure Des Arts De La Marionnette (ESNAM) in Charleville-Mézières, France.

In October 2020 she completed her master's degree at AGRFT titled "The Invisible Space between Puppet and Puppeteer" and has since been working in the following departments: drama play and puppet animation, puppet directing, puppet dramaturgy, teaching puppet animation, artistic design of the puppet show, production of puppets including sculptural work from various materials (wood, polyester resin, styrofoam, foam rubber), sewing, crocheting, knitting, bobbin-making.

Roles in puppet theatre
Year	Title	Theatre	Role	Character/-s
2017	Prva ljubezen	ŠKUC Gledališče	direction, stage performance, dramaturgy, production of puppets, stage design	
2016	Luna	Mestno gledališče Ptuj	puppeteer, production of puppets, props and scenes	
2013	Pazi, Pika	Lutkovno gledališče Ljubljana, Gledališče Koper	puppeteer	Teta Betka
2013	Sovji Grad	Lutkovno gledališče Ljubljana	puppeteer	Franz Pozzi, Milan Klemenčič
2011	Dvojčka in vrag	ŠKUC gledališče	puppeteer, production of puppets	René Fernández Santana
2010	Male Živali	Lutkovno gledališče Ljubljana	puppeteer	Čistilka Violenca Žarek
2009	Burka o jezičnem dohtarju	Lutkovno gledališče Jože Pengov	puppeteer, adaptation of puppets	Ovčar, Sodnik, Dohtarjeva žena
2008	Narcis in Eho	Lutkovno gledališče Ljubljana	puppeteer	Zbor
2008	Srečna srečka	Lutkovno gledališče Ljubljana	puppeteer	Matija, Poglavar podgan, Podgana
2008	Krst pri Savici (Krst pri Savici)	Gledališče GLEJ	direction, dramaturgy, puppeteer	Pater Hieronim, Bogomila
2008	Krst pri Savici (Krst pri Savici)	Gledališče GLEJ, Lutkovno gledališče Ljubljana	direction, dramaturgy, art design, puppeteer, mentor of puppet animation, production of puppets and scenes	Pater Hieronim, Bogomila
2007	Čarovnička	Lutkovno gledališče Ljubljana	puppeteer, animation of other various puppets and objects	Mikša, Turisti
2007	Recital Prešernove poezije (France Prešeren)	extra-institutional projects	master of ceremonies	
2006	Goske	Lutkovno gledališče Ljubljana	direction, dramaturgy, art design, production of puppets and scenes, puppet animation assistance	
2005	Doktor Faust (Doctor Faustus)	Lutkovno gledališče Ljubljana	mentor of puppet animation, puppeteer	Doktor Faust, profesor v Wittenbergu, Gašperček, Karon, čolnar, Viclipucli, Lepa Helena
2004	Svinjski pastir (The Swineherd)	Lutkovno gledališče Ljubljana	puppeteer	Prva dvorna dama
2003	Doktor Faust (Doctor Faustus)	Lutkovno gledališče Ljubljana	mentor for animation of puppets, puppeteer	Doktor Faust, Pluton, Viclipucli
2003	Perzej	Lutkovno gledališče Ljubljana	puppeteer	Mama, Perzefona, kraljica Hada, 3 Graje, sestre starke
2003	Slovenski dramski umetniki meščanom Ljubljane	extra-institutional projects	puppeteer	
2002	Veveriček posebne sorte	Lutkovno gledališče Ljubljana	puppeteer	Veverica Replja, teta
2000	Očka, kje stanuje miklavž?	Lutkovno gledališče Ljubljana	puppeteer	Lisica Zvitorepka, Muca copatarica, Deklica Medvedek, Tri deklice, Zahodna vešča, Parkeljc
2000	Viteški turnir v Šiški	Lutkovno gledališče Ljubljana	puppeteer	Rihard Levjesrčni
1999	Joža	Lutkovno gledališče Ljubljana	puppeteer	Lastnica
1998	Krava v Cirkusu	Lutkovno gledališče Ljubljana	puppeteer	Klovn, Mali klovn, leteče žabe, glasbeni inštrumenti in različni predmeti
1998	Namišljeni bolnik	Lutkovno gledališče Ljubljana	puppeteer	Béline, Arganova druga žena
1997	Črne maske	Lutkovno gledališče Ljubljana	puppeteer	Lorenzo, Prva maska, Petruccio
1996	Mala Lili	Lutkovno gledališče Ljubljana	puppeteer	Fant, Papagaj Pago, Papagaj 2
1996	Zimska pravljica	Lutkovno gledališče Ljubljana	puppeteer	Lisica, Maček
1995	Kače	extra-institutional projects, multimedia project		
1994	Cirkus Cigumigus	Lutkovno gledališče Ljubljana	puppeteer	Koza Piruetka, Mačka Žvrgolinka, Veliki klovn, Lev Leopold
1994	Pepelka (Cindarella)	Lutkovno gledališče Ljubljana	puppeteer, production of puppets	Pepelkina mama, Prva sestra, Otroci, konj, metulji, ptice, drevo, cvetice
1993	Hudobni Graščak	Lutkovno gledališče Ljubljana	puppeteer	Pavliha
1992	Hudič in pastir	Lutkovno gledališče Ljubljana	puppeteer	Pastir, Lucifer
1992	Trnuljčica (Sleeping Beauty)	Cankarjev dom v Ljubljani	puppeteer	
1992	Slavec	Lutkovno gledališče Ljubljana	puppeteer	Mala kuharica, Glasbenica, Plesalka, Pahljačar
1991	Tramvajčica	Lutkovno gledališče Ljubljana	puppeteer	Begajček, Mora Shrhljivka, Paralonca
1991	Nekoč je bil kos lesa	Lutkovno gledališče Ljubljana	direction, puppeteer	
1990	Kronan Norec	Lutkovno gledališče Ljubljana	puppeteer	Sova, Kačja kraljica, Kraljica mravelj
1990	Svoji grad	Lutkovno gledališče Ljubljana	puppeteer	Tajni svetnik Kratohvil, Cmokavzar, Lakaja in pes
1990	Mojca in živali	Lutkovno gledališče Ljubljana	puppeteer	Medved
1989	Zgodba južnega gozda ali kdo je ubil sonce	Lutkovno gledališče Ljubljana	puppeteer	Vedomec, Dubata, prvi Sončev sin
1989	Korenčkov palček	Lutkovno gledališče Ljubljana	puppeteer	Korenček
1989	Rigorka, zvezda z neba	Lutkovno gledališče Ljubljana	puppeteer	Angel - Štirje angeli
1987	Lizistrata	Lutkovno gledališče Ljubljana	puppeteer	Voditeljica žen - Kinesias
1987	Snežna kraljica	Lutkovno gledališče Ljubljana	puppeteer	Babica, Snežna kraljica, Starka, Razbojnikova žena, Golob
1986	Če zmaj požre mamo	Lutkovno gledališče Ljubljana	puppeteer	Pikec
1986	Mrtvec pride po ljubico	Lutkovno gledališče Ljubljana	puppeteer	Anzel, Mrtva Mlinarica
1986	Čudežni prstan	Lutkovno gledališče Ljubljana	puppeteer	Mira - kraljica Mira
1985	Pravljica o carju Saltanu	Lutkovno gledališče Ljubljana	puppeteer	Carica, Babaruha
1985	Zvezdica zaspanka	Lutkovno gledališče Ljubljana	puppeteer	3. zvezda, Papiga
1984	Peter pan v Kensingtonskem parku	Lutkovno gledališče Ljubljana	puppeteer	Ptice, škrati, vile, drevesa, cvetlice
1984	Smešno za zjokat	Lutkovno gledališče Ljubljana	puppeteer	Kraljica Oglate dežele
1983	Igra o letu	Lutkovno gledališče Ljubljana, Cankarjev dom	puppeteer	Zvončnica, Gorska vila, Pehtra
1983	O ptički, ki je ukradla zlato jabolko	Lutkovno gledališče Ljubljana	puppeteer	Svetloba sredi noči
1983	Hiša	Lutkovno gledališče Ljubljana	puppeteer	Mačka
1982	Sanje o govoreči češnji	Lutkovno gledališče Ljubljana	puppeteer	Mačka, ki ribe žgačka
1982	Vrtec pri stari kozi	Lutkovno gledališče Ljubljana	puppeteer	Koza
1980	Guignol v težavah	Lutkovno gledališče Ljubljana	puppeteer	Sodnik
1980	Medvedek Pu (Winnie the Pooh)	Lutkovno gledališče Ljubljana	puppeteer	Teta, Sova
1979	Mali Princ	Lutkovno gledališče Ljubljana	puppeteer	Mali princ
1979	Jakec in njegov stric hladilnik	Lutkovno gledališče Ljubljana	puppeteer	Teta Miša
1978	Zgodba o Ferdinandu	Lutkovno gledališče Ljubljana	puppeteer	Čmrlj, Plesalka
1978	Gugalnica	Lutkovno gledališče Ljubljana	puppeteer	Ptice
1978	Resnična pravljica	Lutkovno gledališče Ljubljana	puppeteer	
1977	Kljukčeva predstava	Lutkovno gledališče Ljubljana	puppeteer	
1977	Živi na soncu mož	Lutkovno gledališče Ljubljana	puppeteer	Zla pošast, ki je vklenila Dobrega moža
1976	Beli konjič	Lutkovno gledališče Ljubljana	puppeteer	Karlinca, Tina
1976	Že že, kaj pa poklic?	Lutkovno gledališče Ljubljana	puppeteer	Kraljica Lenivijeva
1975	Hiša tete Barbare	Lutkovno gledališče Ljubljana	puppeteer	Teta Barbara

Roles in theatre and other production
Year	Title	outlet	Role	Character
2007	Doktor Faust	radio	voice actress	Gašperček
2002	Nevidni prostor med igralcem in lutko	theatre	actress	
1991	Lutkovno gledališče / Portret Milana Klemenčiča	TV	actress	
1984	Obuti maček	theatre	actress, reciter	Obuti maček
1974	Bakhantke / Bakhai	theatrical performance, AGRFT	actress	Zbor
1974	Exitus	short film, AGRFT	actress	
1968	Improvizacija v Versillesu	theatrical performance, AGRFT (3rd year)	actress	Ga. du Parcova
1968	Romeo in Julija	theatrical performance, AGRFT (3rd year)	actress	Capuletova
1968	Lizistrata / Lysistrate	theatrical performance, AGRFT (3rd year)	actress	Zbor žena, žena - zasdeba A, Lizistrata - zasedba B
1968	Variacije	short film, AGRFT	actress	
1968	Cele dneve v krošnjah dreves	SNG Drama Ljubljana	actress	Gostje v baru
1967	Pokopljite mrtve / Bury the Dead	theatrical performance, AGRFT (2nd year)	actress	Katharina Driscolova
1967	Don Carlos	theatrical performance, AGRFT (2nd year)	actress	Eboli
1967	Čas in Conwayevi / Time and the Conways	theatrical performance, AGRFT (2nd year)	actress	Gospa Conway
1966	Spalnik Hiawatha / Pullman Car Hiawatha	theatrical performance, AGRFT (2nd year)	actress	12. ura - slušateljica 1. semestra
