= Lili Novy =

Slovene poet and translator

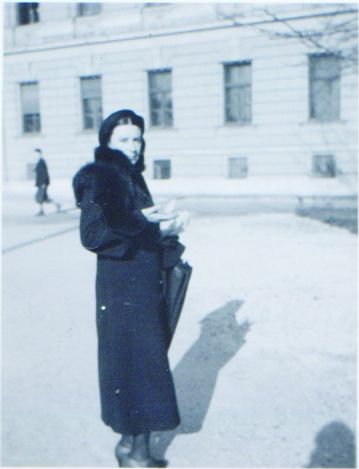
Lili Novy in 1936

Lili Novy née Haumeder (24 December 1885 – 7 March 1958) was a Slovene poet and translator of poetry. She is considered the first Slovene female lyric poet as well as one of the most important Slovene female poets in general.

== Biography ==
She was born in Graz as Lili Haumeder to an ethnic German father named Guid Haumeder and a Slovene mother Ludvika Ahačič. She was educated privately and began writing poetry in German.

In her mid twenties she began to include herself in the Slovene literary scene and began translating Prešeren's German poems into Slovene and vice versa and also began publishing in literary magazines. She also translated a lot of Goethe into Slovene. Gradually, under the influence of Alojz Gradnik, she began writing her own poetry in Slovene. During her lifetime only one collection of her own poems was published: Temna vrata (Dark Door) (1941). After spending an entire life on the move with a husband in the military, Lili Novy eventually settled in Ljubljana.

== Death and legacy ==
Novy died in 1958 at Ljubljana. She was 72 years old. Her bust marks the house in the centre of the old town where she lived. One of the halls in the Cankar Hall Cultural Centre in Ljubljana is also named after her.

In the 1970s, the essayist Jože Javoršek published a monograph on Novy which led to a positive reassessment of her work.

== Published work ==
- Temna vrata (Dark Door) - poetry collection (1941)
- Oboki (Arches) - poetry collection (1959)
- Pikapoka - collection of children's poems (1968)
- Majhni ste na tem velikem svetu (You are Small in this Big World) - collection of children's poems (1973)
