= Dušan Pirjevec =

Slovenian academic

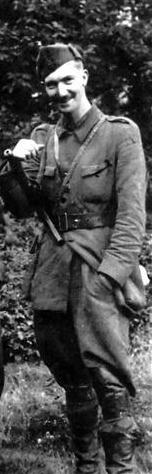
Dušan Pirjevec

Dušan Pirjevec, known by his nom de guerre Ahac (20 March 1921 – 4 August 1977), was a Slovenian Partisan, literary historian and philosopher. He was one of the most influential public intellectuals in post–World War II Slovenia.

== Early years and revolutionary activity ==
Dušan Pirjevec was born in Solkan, which was then a suburb of the Italian town of Gorizia. His birthplace is now located in the Slovenian town of Nova Gorica. His father was the literary historian Avgust Pirjevec from Gorizia; his mother, Iva née Mozetič, came from a wealthy merchant family from Solkan. His sister, Ivica Pirjevec, later became an anti-Nazi agitator and was captured and killed by the Nazis in 1944 (a street in the Ljubljana neighbourhood of Tacen in the Šmarna Gora District bears her name). Soon after Pirjevec's birth, the family moved to Ljubljana, in what was then the Kingdom of Serbs, Croats and Slovenes, where his father worked as the chief librarian of the National Research Library. Pirjevec attended the Ljubljana Technical High School, and in 1939 he enrolled in the University of Zagreb, where he studied agronomy. In 1940, he joined the Communist Party of Yugoslavia.

Already in his teenage years, Pirjevec developed an interest in literature, especially in the French poètes maudits. In the years before World War II, he published several articles under different pseudonyms in the distinguished liberal-progressive literary journal Ljubljanski zvon. Together with the young poet Karel Destovnik Kajuh, he was the co-editor of the radical magazine Svobodna mladina ("The Free Youth").

In the early 1940s, he took part of the "Conflict on the Literary Left", a polemics involving the critical Croatian left-wing writer Miroslav Krleža against the Communist Party's ideological hardliners around Boris Ziherl and Edvard Kardelj. In the polemics, was largely evolving around the relation between personal artistic freedom and collective revolutionary engagement, Pirjevec defended Krleža's insistence on artistic freedom, trying to show that it is not in conflict with a Marxist Leninist position.

== Partisan ==
Soon after the Axis invasion of Yugoslavia in April 1941, Pirjevec joined the Partisan resistance in the Liberation Front of the Slovenian People, adopting the battle name Ahac, by which he remained known for the rest of his life. In late 1941, he was involved in the fight against the Italian Fascist occupation regime in the so-called Province of Ljubljana. He chose the fighting name Ahac (Agathius). The choice was highly symbolic: since the late 16th, Saint Agathius was venerated in the Slovene Lands as the patron saint against Turkish invasions, and in the 17th century he was also venerated as the saint protector of Carniola.

His talent in organization was spotted by the communist leader Aleš Bebler who secured Pirjevec's promotion to the rank of political commissar in the military units active in Lower Carniola. During this time, he became notorious for his bellicosity and brutal treatment of opponents. In a highly controversial memoir published posthumously in 1990, fellow fighter and famous essayist Jože Javoršek even accused Pirjevec of burning war prisoners alive. He was also involved in an internal enquiry over the massacre of a group of Romani people in the region of White Carniola in 1942, but was acquitted. In 1943, he was sent to organize the resistance fight to the Slovenian Littoral and to Friulian Slovenia in Italy, and in 1944 to southern Carinthia.

After the end of the War, Pirjevec was placed in the propaganda units of the newly established communist regime in Slovenia. Between 1945 and 1947, he worked as the editor of the daily newspaper Ljudska pravica (People's Justice), the main communist newspaper in Slovenia. There, he met the literary critic Bojan Štih, who introduced him to contemporary trends in literature. In 1947, Pirjevec became the chairman of the Agitprop section at the University of Ljubljana. During this period, he became a close personal friend with Vitomil Zupan, with whom he engaged in several provocations of what they saw as the "reactionary and petit bourgeoise" cultural scene in Ljubljana. In summer 1948, he was arrested and trialed in a show trial for numerous severe crimes, such as subversive activity, immoral acts and rape. Unlike his close personal friend who was arrested and accused of the same crimes in the same trial, Pirjevec was sentenced to a relatively mild sentence of two years in prison. He was released already after half a year, and put on probation. He was excluded from the Communist Party and stripped of all his war honours.

== The scholar ==
Between 1948 and 1952, Pirjevec studied French language and comparative literature at the University of Ljubljana under the supervision of the literary historian Anton Ocvirk. Between 1952 and 1961, he was employed as a clerk at the Institute for Literature of the Slovenian Academy of Sciences and Arts, later rising to the position of personal assistant to the institute's president Josip Vidmar.

In 1958, Pirjevec became an assistant at the Department for Comparative Literature of the University of Ljubljana. In 1959, he was actively involved the so-called "Slodnjak affair", when the conservative-minded literary historian Anton Slodnjak was dismissed from his post of professor of Slovene literature for having published an anthology of Slovene literature in Germany, which included several authors who were not well viewed by the communist regime. The same year, Pirjevec was admitted again to the Communist Party.

Between 1961 and 1962, Pirjevec started a long polemic with the Serbian writer Dobrica Ćosić regarding the cultural policies in the Socialist Federal Republic of Yugoslavia. In contrast to Ćosić, who argued for Yugoslavism and a more unified cultural policy in Yugoslavia, Pirjevec defended the cultural autonomy of the single republics in the Yugoslav federation and national sentiment. The polemic gave Pirjevec a high degree of public visibility.

In 1961, Pirjevec achieved his PhD in comparative literature and in 1963 he became a professor at the Faculty of Arts of the University of Ljubljana. In the late 1960s, he rose to prominence among students as a charismatic professor. The Department of Comparative Literature, where he taught, became one of the most vibrant centers of Slovene intellectual scene of the 1960s and 1970s. Among Pirjevec's pupils were Dimitrij Rupel, Niko Grafenauer, Rudi Šeligo, Andrej Inkret and many other intellectuals who later formed the core of the intellectual movement focused around the alternative journal Nova revija. In this period, Pirjevec also developed a close friendship with literary historian Taras Kermauner and philosopher Ivo Urbančič, who represented critical positions towards the communist system. In 1964, Pirjevec criticized the regime's decision to prohibit the publication of the alternative journal Perspektive, and was again expulsed from the Party for this reason.

In the 1960s, Pirjevec published several monographs on modern Slovene literature, focusing especially on the fin-de-siecle period. Most famous were his studies on the writer and essayist Ivan Cankar. He also published numerous studies of classical works of the western canon, in which the most famous is his treatise on the problem of evil in the works of Dostoyevski. He based his scholarly research on the esthetic theories of Hegel, Georg Lukács and Mikhail Bakhtin, but also on Sartre's existential philosophy and Roman Ingarden phenomenology of the literary science. He was also receptive to currents coming from the new historicism.

During this period, Pirjevec maintained close contacts with the Praxis School, which was trying to formulate an alternative and humanist vision of Marxism. He was also member of the Committee of the famous Korčula Summer School organized by the Praxis group. Between 1969 and 1971, he served as editor of the Slovenian journal Sodobnost.

In the late 1960s and early 1970s, Pirjevec was sympathetic to the student movement that developed at the University of Ljubljana. In 1971, he joined the protests against the arrest of two students of the university, Frane Adam and Milan Jesih, which escalated in the occupation of the Faculty of Arts by the students.

From the 1970s, Pirjevec gradually left his previous Marxist positions. Under the influence of the philosopher Ivan Urbančič, he grew increasingly closer to the philosophy of Martin Heidegger, whom he personally met in 1974.

He died in Ljubljana on August 4, 1977, and was buried in the cemetery in Šmartno pod Šmarno Goro.

== Personal life ==
Pirjevec was married twice. His first wife was his partisan co-fighter, the university professor of French language Marjeta Vasič, the second was the actress and later writer Nedeljka Kacin. His daughter Alenka Pirjevec is a famous theatre actress and puppeteer. His second daughter with Slovenian journalist Olga Ratej is a Slovenian dramaturg Ira Ratej.

== Influence and legacy ==
Together with Edvard Kocbek, Pirjevec is considered one of the most influential intellectuals in Slovenia in the period between 1945 and 1980. He influenced not only literary critic and history, but also philosophers such as Tine Hribar, Ivan Urbančič, Dean Komel and Croatian philosopher Mario Kopić. He was crucial in the intellectual development of several public figures, among whom the most famous was writer and sociologist Dimitrij Rupel, who later became the first Slovenian foreign minister. Pirjevec was portrayed in several novels and memoirs, including Gert Hofmann's Die Fistelstimme (1982), Milan Dekleva's Oko v zraku ("The Eye in the Air"), Iztok Osojnik's Braşow, Rudi Šeligo's Izgubljeni sveženj ("The Lost Bundle"), and Taras Kermauner's Navzkrižna srečavanja ("Crossed Encounters"), as well as in Boris A. Novak's epos Vrata nepovrata ("The Door of No Return").

Pirjevec's view on the national question, articulated in polemics with the ideologue of Yugoslav Socialism Edvard Kardelj, was particularly influential among the dissident Slovene intellectuals of the late 1970s and 1980s. Pirjevec was the single most quoted author in the "Contributions to the Slovenian National Program", a public manifesto written by 16 non-communist intellectuals in 1987, which is frequently seen as the beginning of the Slovene movement for independence that culminated in the declaration of independence of Slovenia in 1991.

In 1997, a bust of Pirjevec was erected in the hall of the Faculty of Arts of the University of Ljubljana. In 1998, a memorial plaque was placed in his native house in Nova Gorica.

== Sources ==
- Aleš Gabrič, Socialistična kulturna revolucija (Ljubljana: Cankarjeva založba, 1995).
- Mihailo Đurić, Das Denken am Ende der Philosophie. In memoriam Dušan Pirjevec (Ljubljana: 1982).
- Taras Kermauner, Skupinski portret z Dušanom Pirjevcem (Ljubljana: Znanstveno in publicistično središče, 2002).
- Martin Brecelj, Rivoluzione e catarsi. Il pensiero filosofico di Dušan Pirjevec (Trieste: Mladika 2000).
- Janko Kos, Slovenska književnost (Ljubljana: Cankarjeva založba, 1982), 267–268.
- Mario Kopić (ed.), Dušan Pirjevec: Smrt i niština (Zagreb: Demetra, 2009). ISBN 978-953-225-124-1
- Seta Knop (ed.), Dušan Pirjevec, slovenska kultura in literarna veda (Ljubljana: Znanstvena založba Filozofske fakultete, 2011). ISBN 978-961-237-462-4
- Prelević, Marko (2021). Dobrica Ćosić: Vernik i grešnik. Beograd: Nedeljenik.
