= Jože Javoršek =

Slovenian playwright, writer, poet, translator and essayist

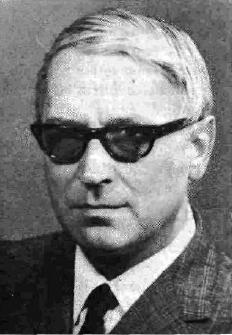
- Born: October 20, 1920; Velike Lašče, Kingdom of Serbs, Croats and Slovenes (now in Slovenia)
- Died: September 2, 1990 (aged 69); Ljubljana, Slovenia
- Occupations: Playwright, writer, essayist
- Writing career
- Movements: Existentialism, Surrealism, Theatre of the Absurd

Jože Javoršek was the pen name of Jože Brejc (October 20, 1920 – September 2, 1990), a Slovenian playwright, writer, poet, translator and essayist. He is regarded as one of the greatest masters of style and language among Slovene authors. A complex thinker and controversial personality, Javoršek is frequently considered, together with the writer Vitomil Zupan, as the paradigmatic example of the World War II and postwar generation of Slovene intellectuals.

== Life ==
Javoršek was born as Jože Brejc in the small Lower Carniolan town of Velike Lašče, in what was then the Kingdom of Serbs, Croats and Slovenes. He studied comparative literature at the University of Ljubljana. During his student years, he became involved with Slovenian Christian Socialist groups, where he met the poet and thinker Edvard Kocbek. Kocbek had a huge influence on Javoršek, encouraging him to pursue a literary career.

During World War II, Javoršek joined the Partisan resistance, where he fought alongside the later philosopher and literary critic Dušan Pirjevec and the writer Vitomil Zupan. It was during his underground activity in the Italian-ruled Province of Ljubljana that he adopted the pseudonym Jože Javoršek. After the end of the War in 1945, he worked as the personal secretary of Edvard Kocbek, who was appointed Minister for Slovenia in the Yugoslav government. He continued his studies at the French Sorbonne and shortly worked as assistant at the Yugoslav embassy in Paris. In the French capital, he frequented the circles of French left-wing intellectuals; among others, he became acquainted with Albert Camus, and established a close friendship with Louis Guilloux, Gérard Philipe, and Marcel Schneider.

He returned to Slovenia in 1948. The next year, he was imprisoned by the Communist authorities and sentenced to 12 years in prison at a show trial. He was released in 1952, but rehabilitated only shortly before his death in 1990.

After returning to liberty, he mostly worked as a playwright and stage director in several Slovene-language theatres in Ljubljana. During this time, he was among the first who introduced the surrealist and absurdist elements on Slovenian and Yugoslav stages. He established close contacts with the stage directors Žarko Petan and Bojan Štih who both shared some of Javoršek's modernist and progressive esthetic views. Javoršek managed to stage several plays based on the theories of Antonin Artaud and Alfred Jarry in the Drama Theatre of Ljubljana, directed by Štih. Because of this innovative approach that challenged the cultural policies of the Communist regime, Javoršek gained influence on the younger generation of Slovene artists and authors, known as the Critical generation, who departed from the prevailing humanistic and intimistic trend in Slovenian culture and literature of the time and embraced more metaphysical questions. Among those young authors were Dominik Smole, Taras Kermauner, Primož Kozak, and others. Javoršek had nevertheless a critical attitude to the younger generations and often disapproved their radical modernist approaches.

Between 1961 and 1967, Javoršek worked as an assistant at the Slovenian Academy of Sciences and Arts and between 1967 and 1982 as secretary in the office of the Academy's president Josip Vidmar.

He died in Ljubljana in 1990 and was buried in his hometown of Velike Lašče. A memorial plaque, designed by the Slovene sculptor Stojan Batič, was placed on his birthplace in the 1990s.

== Work ==
Javoršek wrote poetry, plays, novels and essays. He started as a poet. Already as a teenager, he published several poems in the left-wing Slovenian magazines of the time, such as Mladina and Kocbek's Dejanje. After World War II, a collection of his wartime poems, entitled Partizanska lirika ("Partisan Lyrics"), was issued in 1947. After his experience in jail, he turned mostly to plays, essays and prose. During his lifetime, he published another collection of poems under the title Usoda poezije ("The Fate of Poetry", 1972), which he himself edited with extensive critical and biographical commentary.

Javoršek gained recognition foremost as a playwright. His early plays, based on existential concerns, but filled with irony, playfulness and artistic use of language games, largely contributed to the modernization of the Slovene theatre in the 1950s. In his plays, he was critical towards the established political powers and social conformism.

He wrote several novels, the most notable being Hvalnica zemlji ("An Ode to the Earth", 1971) and Nevarna razmerja ("Dangerous Liaisons", 1978). But it was in his essays and memoirs that he gained most recognition and also caused most controversy. One of the first essayistic works that made him famous to the wider public was the book Kako je mogoče? ("How Is It Possible?), in which he explored his feelings of desperation after the suicide of his son Svit. The book is written as a dialogue between two generations that fail to comprehend each other. It is also a strong critique of the younger generation of Slovenes in general – and young intellectuals in particular – whom Javoršek accused of nihilism. He also published a Guide Through Ljubljana (Vodnik po Ljubljani) in which he presented the city's sights and history in the light of an ironic, philosophical and existential reflection, linking the monuments to the personal fates of the famous individuals connected with them. The epistolary novel Nevarna razmerja, a paraphrase of Pierre Choderlos de Laclos'es famous book Les Liaisons dangereuses, is written as a serial of partially authentic and partially fictitious letters between the author and several notable figures, both living and dead, among whom Vitomil Zupan, Boris Pahor, Pierre Emmanuel, Taras Kermauner, Dusan Pirjevec, and Francesco Robba.

In his last works, La Memoire Dangereuse ("The Dangerouse Memory"), which was published in French by a Parisian editing house and translated into several European languages, and Spomini na Slovence ("Memories of the Slovenes"), published shortly before his death, he explored his memory and gave a sometimes extremely critical accounts of his contemporaries.

He wrote influential essays on Molière, Shakespeare, the Slovenian poet Lili Novy and the Slovene protestant preacher and pioneer of Slovenian literature Primož Trubar. He was also an admirer of the 19th-century Slovene author Fran Levstik and helped to republish new editions of his works. Shortly before his death in 1990, he also contributed to the monograph Histoire et littérature slovènes ("Slovenian History and Literature", published by the Centre Georges Pompidou of Paris.

He also translated several important authors into Slovene, mostly from French and Serbo-Croatian, among them Corneille, Molière, Hippolyte Taine, Eugène Ionesco, Jean Anouilh, Edmond Rostand, Jean-Paul Sartre, Albert Camus, and Meša Selimović.

== Personality ==
During his lifetime, Javoršek was considered a controversial and unique personality. His dubious relationship with the establishment, as well as his sometimes extremely acrimonious attacks on the contemporary literary circles, both Slovene and French, gained him the nickname The Lonely Rider. His last work, "Memories of the Slovenes", published partly posthumously in three parts, created a controversy and shed a new light on the Slovene literary and cultural scene of the War and Postwar period. Among the several scabrous details described by Javoršek in the copious work, are the misdeeds of the influential thinker Dušan Pirjevec Ahac allegedly perpetrated during the war resistance, as well as the conduct of notable personalities such as the literary critic Josip Vidmar and the poet Edvard Kocbek, for whom Javoršek worked as a personal secretary. The work also includes details about the personal lives of Slovenian Communist leaders Edvard Kardelj and Boris Kidrič.

Despite his negative experience in jail, Javoršek remained a convinced supporter of Socialism. Although he started as a Christian Socialist, he later rejected Christianity, as can be seen from his writings, and embraced a nietzschean style of vitalism and skepticism.

Javoršek regarded himself as being primarily a theater manager and not an intellectual or a writer. As such, he often claimed he had the license of a court jester and loved drawing parallels between himself and the famous playwrights in history who were also theatre managers, such as Shakespeare, Molière or Carlo Goldoni. He probably best explained the way in which he saw his own role in the essay Shakespeare and Politics, which was written in 1965 for a volume entitled "Shakespeare among the Slovenes", edited by the famous literary critic France Koblar and published by the Slovenska matica publishing house. In the essay, he made the following assessment of Shakespeare:

If Shakespeare had been a slightly more important person during his lifetime, at least as important as Ben Jonson, history would have provided us with more details about his life. But Shakespeare was not at the top of the social ladder, he was little more than a parasite of contemporary magnates. Nor did he belong to the great minds of his time. He was too uneducated to achieve such a position, as it is known. The romantic ideas according to which Shakespeare was a great wit, a great historian or a great thinker, are nowadays completely rejected […]. Today, it is evident that Shakespeare was first of all a true dodger of his era. He used the various materials from history or from the contemporary circumstances in England to create attractive theatrical masterpieces. First of all, we have to understand that Shakespeare never thought of theatre as literature. The theatre was a dangerous and slightly indecent institution, which every respectful and truly honored member of the society would rather avoid.

This is a description of Javoršek's perception of his own role in the society.

== Influence and legacy ==
Although he tried to avoid direct clashes with the Communist establishment after his release from jail, Javoršek was one of the main driving force behind the establishment of the Stage '57, an alternative theatre created in 1957 by the younger generations of Slovene artists, which had a crucial role in shaping their generation against the pressures of the repressive cultural policies of the Communist regime. Already during his lifetime, he gained recognition in other parts of Yugoslavia, especially in Serbia. Some consider him to be one of the best essayists in Slovene, together with Ivan Cankar, Marjan Rožanc and Drago Jančar. His book La Memoire Dangereuse, published in the 1980s by the French publishing house Arléa, gained him an important recognition beyond Yugoslav borders. The book has been translated also to German and Serbo-Croatian.

== Personal life ==
Javoršek's first wife died while he was in prison. Their only son, Svit, committed suicide in 1969, at the age of 23. He later married the translator Marija Kiauta.

== Essential bibliography ==
=== Poetry ===
- Partizanska lirika ("Partisan Lyrics", 1947)
- Usoda poezije ("The Fate of Poetry", 1972)

=== Plays ===
- Odločitev ("The Decision", 1953)
- Kriminalna zgodba ("Criminal Story", 1955)
- Konec hrepenenja ("The End of Yearning", 1955)
- Povečevalno steklo ("Amplifying Glass", 1956)
- Veselje do življenja ("Joy of Life", 1958)
- Manevri ("Maneuvers", 1960)
- Dežela gasilcev ("A Land of Firemen", 1973)
- Improvizacija v Ljubljani ("An Improvisation in Ljubljana", 1977)

=== Essays ===
- Srečanja ("Encounters", 1958)
- Okus sveta ("The Flavour of the World", 1961)
- Indija Koromandija ("The Neverland", 1962)
- Vodnik po Ljubljani ("A Guide to Ljubljana", 1965)
- Shakespeare in politika ("Shakespeare and Politics", 1965)
- Kako je mogoče? ("How Is It Possible", 1969)
- Esej o Molieru ("An Essay on Molière", 1974)
- Primož Trubar (1977)
- Lili Novy (1984)
- La Memoire Dangereuse ("The Dangerous Memory", 1987)
- Spomini na Slovence ("Memories of the Slovenes", 1989)

=== Prose ===
- Obsedena tehtnica ("An Obsessed Scales", 1961)
- Spremembe ("Changes", 1967)
- Hvalnica zemlji ("An Ode to the Earth", 1971)
- Nevarna razmerja ("Dangerous Liaisons", 1978)

== See also ==
- Slovenian literature
- Culture of Slovenia
- Liberation Front of the Slovenian People

== Sources ==
- Jože Horvat, "Umrl je Jože Javoršek" in Delo, yr.32, n.206 (November 4, 1990), 1.
- Milenko Karan, "Nasprotnika ni nikoli doživljal kot sovražnika" in Delo, yr.32, n.238 (October 11, 1990), 14.
- Jože Kastelic, Jože Brejc (Jože Javoršek) (Ljubljana: Literarni klub, 1999).
- Dušan Mevlja, "Jože Javoršek: in memoriam" in Večer, yr. 46, n.207 (September 5, 1990), 15.
- Aleksij Pregarc, "Jože Javoršek: in memoriam" in Primorski dnevnik, yr.46, n.203 (September 9, 1990), 17.
- Barbara Rančigaj, Jože Javoršek in drama absurda (Ljubljana: Filozofska fakulteta Univerze v Ljubljani, 2004).
- Jože Šifrer, "Jože Javoršek" in Delo, yr.32, n.208 (September 6, 1990), 7.
- Slobodan Selenić, "Jože Javoršek" in Scena: časopis za pozorišnu umetnost (Belgrade, 1990).
- Franc Zadravec, Jože Javoršek: Nevarna razmerja. Slovenski roman dvajsetega stoletja (Ljubljana: Znanstveni inštitut Filozofske fakultete, 1997–2002).
- Ciril Zlobec, "Samotni jezdec Javoršek: v spomin" in Dnevnik, yr. 38, n.243 (September 6, 1990), 8.
- Ivan Zoran, "Odšel je samotni jezdec" in Dolenjski list, yr.41, n.37 (September 13, 1990).
