= Mihailo Đurić =

Serbian philosopher (1925–2011)

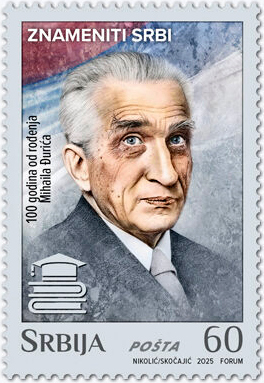
- Đurić on a 2025 stamp of Serbia
- Born: 22 August 1925
- Died: 25 November 2011 (aged 86)
- Education: University of Belgrade
- Occupation: Philosopher

Mihailo Đurić (Serbian Cyrillic: Михаило Ђурић; 22 August 1925 – 25 November 2011) was one of Serbia's most prominent philosophers. He was a professor at the University of Belgrade's Law School and member of the Serbian Academy of Sciences and Arts.

Within the frame of ancient Greek culture, he studied philosophy, law, politics and history, but also modern political theory and ethics. A majority of his works are within the field of philosophy and method of sociology, history of political theories and political science. In the past two decades, his work was mainly devoted to the study of Nietzsche and Heidegger.

== Education ==
Đurić studied law, philosophy and classic philology in Belgrade, where he obtained his PhD with the thesis on Ideas of the Natural Law in Greek Sophists (1954). He was professor at Law School from 1954 until 1973, when, for political reasons, he was removed from the university. In 1954 he was appointed as Research Fellow at the University of Belgrade's Law School, where he was later promoted to Assistant Professor in 1957, Associate Professor in 1964, and full Professor in 1969. He taught History of Political Theory, General Sociology and Methodology of Social Science.

== Trial and imprisonment ==
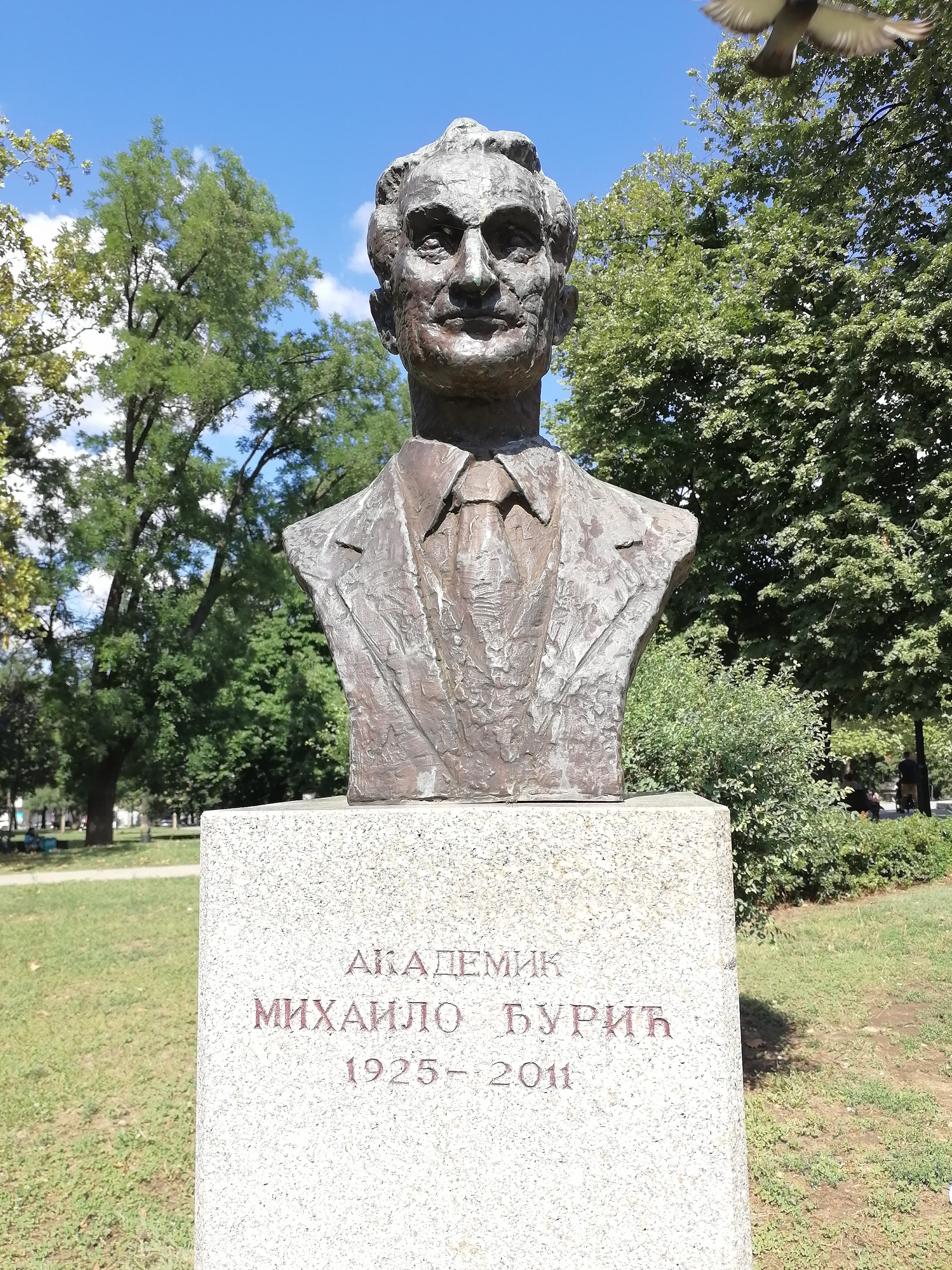
The bust of Mihailo Đurić at Mali Tašmajdan

In 1972, Mihailo Đurić was expelled from the university, tried and sentenced to 9 months in prison for his criticism of the 1971 Constitutional Amendments as well as his opposition to demolishing of the Petar Petrović Njegoš chapel on Mount Lovćen. The discussion at the Law Faculty was delivered in a public discussion within the university building and the article on Njegoš in a literary review written in opposition to the destruction.

During his trial and imprisonment, many public figures expressed their opposition to then Yugoslav communist government, among them philosopher Ernst Bloch.

After the release from prison Đurić was formally employed at the Institute of Social Sciences in Belgrade, from 1974 until 1989, when he returned to university. From his release from prison (1972), he was also a visiting professor at the Universities of Vienna, Berlin and Augsburg. In 1991, after rehabilitation, he returned to Law School. For many years Đurić was a member of the Institute of Philosophy at the University of Belgrade Faculty of Philosophy, the Scientific Council of which he chaired from 1986 until 1998.

== Nietzsche and Heidegger ==
Starting from 1980s, Đurić's writings both in Serbian and in German fundamentally contributed to our understanding of the works of Nietzsche and Heidegger and the crucial link between these two philosophers. While his Nietzsche and the Metaphysics (1984) and The Challenge of Nihilism (1986) concentrate mainly on Nietzsche, the On the Need of Philosophy Today: Philosophy between East and West is mainly a book about Heidegger and his reading of Nietzsche.

== Selected bibliography ==
=== Đurić's prominent works in Serbian ===
- Ideja prirodnog prava kod grčkih sofista- Beograd, 1954 (The Idea of Natural Law among the Greek Sophists)
- Problemi sociološkog metoda- Beograd, 1962 (Problems of the Sociological Method)
- Sociologija Maksa Vebera- Zagreb, 1964 (Sociology of Max Weber)
- Humanizam kao politički ideal: Ogled o grčkoj kulturi- Beograd, 1968 (Humanism as Political Ideal :A Study of Greek Culture)
- Stihija savremenosti- Beograd, 1972, (Disaster of the Iskustvo razlike: Suočavanje s vremenom- Beograd, 1994 (The Experience of Difference : Facing the Modern Age)
- Niče i metafizika- Beograd, 1984 (Nietzsche and the Metaphysics)
- Izazov nihilizma – Beograd, 1986 (The Challenge of Nihilism)
- Mit, nauka, ideologija. Nacrt filozofije kulture – Beograd, 1989 (Myth, Science, Ideology. Outline of a Philosophy of Culture)
- Filozofija u dijaspori. Petronijevićeva “Načela metafizike”- Novi Sad, 1989 (Philosophy in Diaspora. Petronijevics “Principles of Metaphysics”)
- Putevi ka Ničeu : Prilozi filozofiji budućnosti- Beograd, 1992 (Roads to Nietzsche : Contributions to the Philosophy of Future)
- Iskustvo razlike : Suočavanje s vremenom- Beograd, 1994 (The Experience of Difference : Facing the Modern Age)
- O potrebi filozofije danas : Filozofija između Istoka i Zapada- Beograd, 1999 (On the Need of Philosophy Today: Philosophy between East and West)
- Poreklo i budućnost Evrope : Odiseja drevne filozofske ideje- Beograd, 2001 (Origin and Future of Europe : Odyssey of one ancient philosophic Idea)
- Krhko ljudsko dobro. Aktuelnost Aristotelove praktičke filozofije- Beograd, 2002 (The Fragile Human Good. Contemporary Importance of Aristotle 's Practical Philosophy)
- Srbija i Evropa između prošlosti i budućnosti. Letopis jugoslovenske tragedije- Beograd, 2003 (Serbia and Europe between Past and Future. Annals of the Yugoslav Tragedy)
- Raška beseda, 2003

=== Đurić's prominent works in German ===
- Mythos, Wissenschaft, Ideologie: ein Problemaufriss, Amsterdam 1979.
- Nietzsche und die Metaphysik, Berlin 1985.
- Kunst und Wissenschaft bei Nietzsche, Würzburg, 1986.
- Nietzsches Begriff der Philosophie, Würzburg, 1990.
- Die Serbische Philosophie heute, München, 1993.

=== Editor and coauthor ===
- Das Denken am Ende der Philosophie. In memoriam Dušan Pirjevec (Ljubljana 1982)
- Kunst und Wissenschaft bei Nietzsche (Würzburg 1986)
- Nietzsches Begriff der Philosophie (Würzburg 1990)
- Nietzsche und Hegel (Würzburg 1992)
- Die serbische Philosophie heute (München 1993)
