= Mario Kopić =

Croatian philosopher (born 1965)

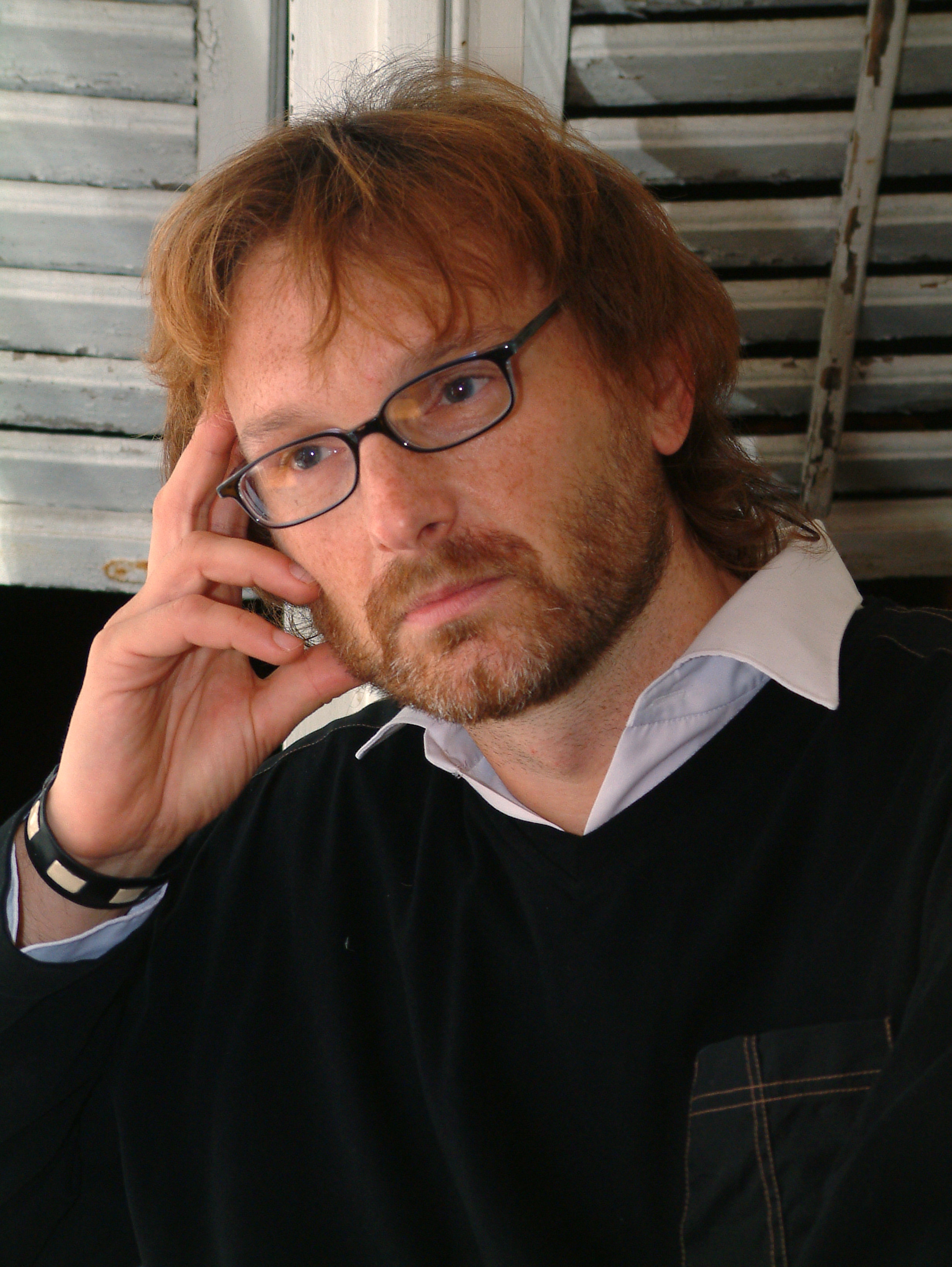
- Born: 13 March 1965 (age 60); Dubrovnik, Croatia, former Yugoslavia

Philosophical work
- Era: 21st-century philosophy
- Region: Western Philosophy
- School: Continental philosophy, existentialism, phenomenology
- Main interests: Ethics, religion, culture

Mario Kopić (born 13 March 1965) is a philosopher, author and translator. His main areas of interest include: the history of ideas, the philosophy of art, the philosophy of culture, phenomenology and the philosophy of religion.

Kopić is influenced by and writes extensively on Friedrich Nietzsche, Martin Heidegger, Hannah Arendt, Jacques Derrida, Gianni Vattimo, Reiner Schürmann and Dušan Pirjevec. He also translated works by Nietzsche (Thus Spoke Zarathustra, On the Genealogy of Morality), Giorgio Agamben, Gianni Vattimo, Jacques Derrida, Emmanuel Levinas and Dušan Pirjevec into Croatian.

== Life and work ==
Mario Kopić was born in Dubrovnik, Croatia, former Yugoslavia. He studied philosophy and comparative literature at the University of Zagreb; phenomenology and anthropology at the University of Ljubljana; the history of ideas at the Institute Friedrich Meinecke at the Free University of Berlin (under the mentorship of Ernst Nolte); and comparative religion and anthropology of religion at the Sapienza University of Rome (under the mentorship of Ida Magli).

Mario Kopić's philosophical work is under the influence of the Italian philosophical approach known as pensiero debole or "weak thought", the political thought of Arendt, and the ethical-political thought of late Derrida.

In his latest works The Unhealable Wound of the World, The Challenges of the Post-metaphysics, Sextant and The Beats of the Other Kopić developed a kind of onto-politics of liberal-conservative postmodernism and the post-anthropocentric humanism. For him the world is the space of being as event, and only then the arena of national and social or political conflict. The world, or existence, is our ontological responsibility, which precedes political, judicial and moral responsibility.

Kopić appears in Igor Ivanov Izi's 1995 film N.E.P.

== Published books ==
- Art and Philosophy: An Anthology (Filozofija i umjetnost - Antologija), Delo 11-12 /1990, Belgrade 1990.
- Experiencing the Margins of the Sense (Iskušavanje rubova smisla: pabirci iz estetike), Dubrovnik 1991.
- With Nietzsche on Europe (S Nietzscheom o Europi), Zagreb 2001.ISBN 953-222-016-X
- Nietzsche and Evola: The Thought as Destiny (Nietzsche e Evola: il pensiero come destino), Rome 2001.
- A Trial to the West (Proces Zapadu), Dubrovnik 2003. ISBN 953-7089-02-9
- The Challenges of the Post-Metaphysics (Izazovi post-metafizike), Sremski Karlovci - Novi Sad 2007. ISBN 978-86-7543-120-6
- The Unhealable Wound of the World (Nezacjeljiva rana svijeta), Zagreb 2007. ISBN 978-953-249-035-0
- Gianni Vattimo Reader (Ed.),(Gianni Vattimo: Čitanka (Ur.)), Zagreb 2008. ISBN 978-953-249-061-9
- Dušan Pirjevec, Death and Nothing (ed.), (Smrt i niština, (Ur.)) Zagreb 2009. ISBN 978-953-225-124-1
- Sextant: The Outlines of the Spiritual Foundations of the World (Sekstant: Skice o duhovnim temeljima svijeta), Belgrade 2010. ISBN 978-86-519-0449-6
- The Beats of the Other (Otkucaji drugoga), Belgrade 2013. ISBN 978-86-519-1721-2
- The Windows: Essays on Art and Literature (Prozori: Ogledi o umjetnosti), Dubrovnik 2015. ISBN 978-953-7835-24-8
- Darkness in the Pupil of the Sun: Philosophical Essays (Tama u zjenici sunca: Filozofski ogledi), Dubrovnik 2018 ISBN 978-953-7835-43-9
- Desire and Striving (Žudnja i stremljenje), Zagreb 2018 ISBN 978-953-341-117-0
- Against the Obvious (Protiv samorazumljivosti), With Vedran Salvia, Dubrovnik 2020. ISBN 978-953-7835-57-6
- The Otherworld according to Dante Alighieri (Prekogroblje po Danteu), Zagreb 2021. ISBN 978-953-341-219-1
- The Incurable Sight of Words (Neizlječivi pogled riječi), Dubrovnik 2023. ISBN 978-953-7835-74-3
- Etudes about Love and Death. Plato, Dante, Dostoevsky, Derrida, Belgrade 2023. ISBN 978-86-80640-79-2
- Return to Wonder (Povratište čuđenju), Belgrade 2024. ISBN 978-86-80640-98-3
- Incidentals (Usputice), Dubrovnik 2025. ISBN 978-953-7835-84-2

== See also ==
- Continental philosophy
- Postmodern Christianity
- Ontotheology
- Phenomenology (philosophy)
- Phenomenology of religion

== Sources ==
- Interview with Mario Kopić, Zarez, 2008 (in Croatian)
- Interview with Mario Kopić, Danas, 2010 (in Serbian)
- Interview with Mario Kopić, Dubrovački list, 2011 (in Croatian)
- Interview with Mario Kopić, Dubrovački list, 2015 (in Croatian)
- Nezacjeljiva rana svijeta (in Croatian)
- 2011 article by Mario Kopić about Hannah Arendt (in Croatian)
- 2012 article by Mario Kopić about Heidegger (in Croatian)
- 2013 article by Mario Kopić about Derrida (in Croatian)
- 2015 article by Mario Kopić about Reiner Schürmann (in Croatian)
