= Slavko Grum =

Slovenian physician and writer

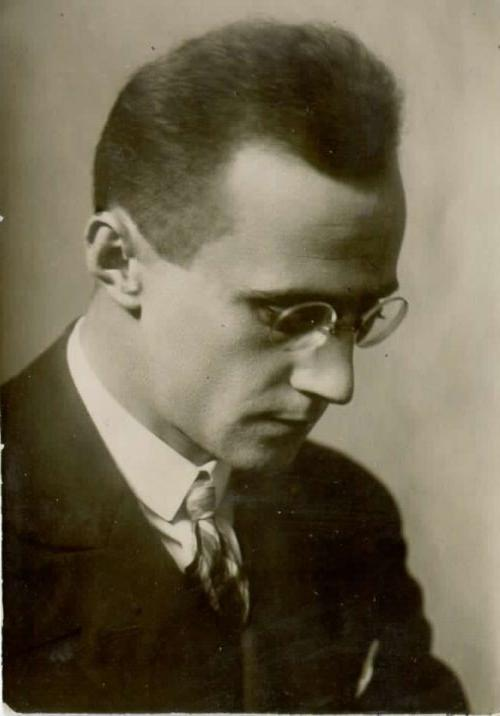
- Born: 2 August 1901; Šmartno pri Litiji
- Died: 3 August 1949 (aged 48); Zagorje ob Savi
- Occupations: physician, playwright, novellist, essayist
- Writing career
- Period: 1921–1940; the mature period of his writing 1925–1929
- Notable work: An Event in the Town of Goga
- Notable awards: An Event in the Town of Goga (Dogodek v mestu Gogi): second award in the field of drama in Belgrade
- Literary movement: expressionism, symbolism, naturalism, decadence

Slavko (Ignacij) Grum (1901–1949) was a Slovenian physician, playwright and prose writer.

== Life ==
Grum was born as the third, second-to-last child of Franc Grum, a foreman at the leather factory in Šmartno pri Litiji, and Marija Grum, née Dolšek. Due to his father's job, the family moved to Novo Mesto in 1906, where he attended elementary schol as a day student at the Franciscan monastery. One of his teachers was Father Blanko, who encouraged him to write and also sparked his interest in the natural sciences. Due to work obligations, the rest of the family moved to Mokronog and then to Konjice, while he remained in Novo Mesto with a boarding house landlady. After finishing elementary school, he attended high school from 1911 to 1919. During this time, he lived with his sister Marija and the Novo Mesto businessman Josip Klemenčič in an attic room, which he affectionately called the "coffin". In 1919, he graduated from high school and, despite his parents' urging that he study theology, decided to pursue medicine in Vienna, for which he secured a scholarship. He enjoyed going to the theater and the movies. As a doctor, he became versed in psychoanalysis, a new field of psychiatry that emphasises the unconscious aspect of human life. This had a significant impact on his artistic work, which was closely linked to his professional interests. In 1920, he faced an existential crisis, suffered from psychosomatic disorders, and became addicted to cocaine. Once the crisis had passed, he wrote prolifically. During rehearsals for the production of Cankar's Lepa Vida, he became close to the actress playing the title role, Joža Debelak, the daughter of a head teacher from Šmartno and an electrical engineering student. She was his most important literary and personal confidante. In 1926, he graduated and returned home. In Ljubljana, he was drafted into the army, but was discharged after two months due to a heart condition. At the end of 1926, he began his mandatory internship at hospitals in Ljubljana and, at his own request, remained at the hospital as an assistant physician. As a doctor, he worked at a women's hospital and a psychiatric clinic, where he gathered material for writing his most important works and plays. In 1929, the National Theatre in Ljubljana rejected his request to stage his play An Event in the Town of Goga, for which he had received a second prize in Belgrade. In addition, his request for a transfer to a hospital in his hometown was denied. He broke up with Joža Debelak, which led to an increase in his drug addiction. Disappointed, he resigned from his job and, together with his possessive and domineering mother, settled in Zagorje and became a very successful doctor in private practice. After 1929, his literary output began to dwindle; he published only reprints and variations. In 1946, he attempted suicide by taking Veronal. Three years later, he died of liver cancer in an isolation ward in Zagorje. He is buried in Šmihel near Novo Mesto.

== Literary work ==
While studying in Vienna, Grum developed a passion for theatre and cinema; he was particularly fascinated by the melodramatic and sentimental mannerisms of the silent film star of the time, Conrad Veidt. From 1921 to 1924, he wrote the plays Pierrot and Pierrette (Pierrot in Pierrette), The Merciless Saviour (Neusmiljeni odrešenik), and Tired Curtains (Trudni zastori). In 1921, he became acquainted with Freud, who had a profound influence on his later works. In 1922, he was captivated by Alexander Moissi's melancholic, decadent and morbid performance in a production of Ibsen's Ghosts. During the summer of 1922, he staged an amateur production of Funtek's The Race (Tekma), followed the next year by Cankar's Beautiful Vida (Lepa Vida) and Strindberg's Miss Julie. His period of mature writing spanned from 1925 to 1929. For the most part, he did not publish in magazines, but in a far less prestigious venue, the daily newspaper Jutro. His works were translated by Czechs and Slovaks. By 1928, nine short stories had been translated into foreign languages. The next artist who inspired him was director Alexander Tairov, in a production of Wilde's Salome. In 1927, he published the dramatic scene The Rebel (Upornik) and compiled a selection of his published short storiest titled White Asylum (Beli azil), was to be printed by Tiskovna zadruga and the Slovak publishing house Slovenský východ, but it was never actually published. In 1928, he gave a lecture on the sexual education of youth at the Matica cinema, where he explained Freud's theory and later published the lecture. That same year, he published his best-known work, the drama An Event in the Town of Goga (Dogodek v mestu Gogi), for which he received second prize in the field of drama in Belgrade. It was staged three years later at the National Theatre in Maribor and subsequently at the National Theatre in Ljubljana. An Event in the Town of Goga, and with it Slavko Grum, is considered a Slovenian classic. That was followed by essays, including the psychoanalytic text Suicide (Samomor). He conceived a collection of short stories titled The Prodigal Son (Izgubljeni sin). By the end of his life, he had further written only the narrative works Escape to the Beyond (Beg v onstran) and Escape from Life (Beg iz življenja), the novella The Boy and the Madman (Deček in blaznik), and the popular science essay The Truth About Alcohol (Resnica o alkoholu). His bequest, comprising Grum's most important literary works, was donated by Olga Hlede and is kept at the Miran Jarc Library in Novo Mesto.

== Namings ==
A street in Novo Mesto and the Slavko Grum Elementary School in Zagorje ob Savi are named after Slavko Grum. In Litija, the former district headquarters has been renovated to house the Dr. Slavko Grum Central Library. On the 120th anniversary of his birth (2021), a bust of him was unveiled in his hometown of Šmartno pri Litiji.

The Grum Award for the best Slovenian play is named after him. At the main municipal celebration during the cultural festival in Zagorje, the Slavko Grum plaque is also awarded to cultural workers for their many years of successful work in the field of culture.
