= Maks Bajc =

Slovenian actor

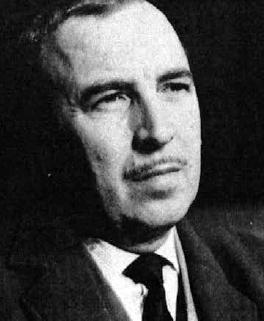
Maks Bajc

Maks Bajc (7 October 1919, in Ljubljana – 25 September 1983) was a Slovenian actor who acted in Yugoslavian movies from 1955 until 1983.

Bajc was also a theatre actor and a member of the Ljubljana Drama Group.

He played in films including Tri četrtine sonca (1959), Ballad About a Trumpet and a Cloud (1961) and Stronghold of Toughs.

== Partial filmography ==
- 1983: Zadah tela
- 1980: Nasvidenje v naslednji vojni
- 1977: To so gadi
- 1977: Kavarna
- 1976: Idealist
- 1969: Pozdravi Marijo
- 1968: Sončni krik
- 1967: Grajski biki
- 1964: Ne joči, Peter
- 1963: Samorastniki
- 1960: Akcija
- 1959: Tri četrtine sonca
