= Stronghold of Toughs =

Grajski biki
- Directed by: Jože Pogačnik
- Written by: Marjan Brezovar, Peter Kavalar
- Starring: Nikola-Kole Angelovski; Maks Bajc; Miha Baloh; Polde Bibič; Hana Brejchová; Olivera Markovič
- Release date: 26 April 1967
- Running time: 88 minutes
- Country: Yugoslavia
- Language: Slovene

Grajski biki is a 1967 Yugoslav film directed by Jože Pogačnik. Its international English title is Stronghold of Toughs.

== Plot summary ==
The film is a somber social drama in which war orphans rebel against teachers and authority figures in their reform school. It stars Danny, a teen punk who organizes a breakout, only to become a victim of the code of toughness by which he lives. Sex and violence are included in the sometimes confusing story that appeared at the Mannheim Film Festival in 1967.
