= Performing arts of Slovenia =

Performing arts of Slovenia are shaped by a number of Slovenian actors and actresses, dancers, theatre directors, and theatre managers. Several professional and a number of amateur community theatres operate on the repertory system in Slovenia.

== The national theatres ==
There are four national theatres in Slovenia that include the Ljubljana National Drama Theatre and Slovene National Theatre Opera and Ballet Company, both located in Ljubljana; the Maribor National Drama Theatre, located in Maribor; and Slovenian Littoral National Theatre, located in Nova Gorica.

== Other professional theatres ==
Founded in 1949, Ljubljana City Theatre (Mestno Gledalisce Ljubljansko MGL) is the second largest drama theatre in Slovenia. Founded in 1955 as the first professional theatre for children and youth in Slovenia was the Slovenian Youth Theatre. Established in 1948, the Ljubljana Puppet Theatre, located in Ljubljana, is a puppet repertory theatre.

Established in 2011, the Koper Theatre, located in Koper, is the second youngest professional theatre in Slovenia.

Other professional theatres include Glej Theatre., Preseren Theatre Kranj (Presernovo gledalisce Kranj), Celje City Theatre (Slovensko Ljudsko Gledalisce Celje SLG), Maribor Puppet Theatre (Lutkovno Gledalisce Maribor).

== See also ==
- Music of Slovenia
- Art of Slovenia
