= Vitomil Zupan =

Slovene writer and Gonars concentration camp survivor

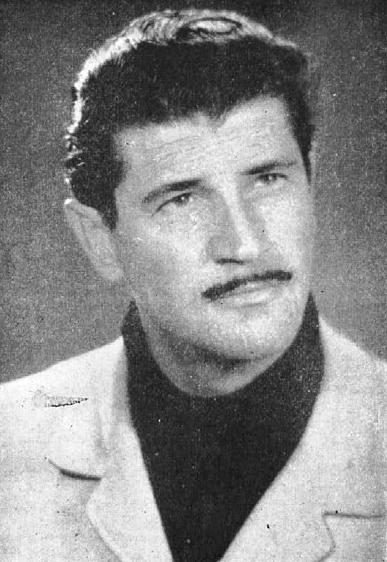
- Born: 18 January 1914; Ljubljana, Duchy of Carniola, Austria-Hungary (now in Slovenia)
- Died: 14 May 1987 (aged 73); Ljubljana, Slovenia, Yugoslavia
- Occupations: Writer, playwright, poet, screenwriter
- Children: Dim Zupan
- Writing career
- Notable works: Menuet za kitaro, Komedija človeškega tkiva, Levitan, Igra s hudičevim repom

Vitomil Zupan (18 January 1914 – 14 May 1987) was a post-World War II modernist Slovene writer (Note: In addition to his novels, he also wrote poetry, plays, essays, and screenplays. He wrote the screenplay for Maškarada, directed by Boštjan Hladnik, which, despite being screened only in a censored form, became a cult film of the Slovenian hippie generation.) and Gonars concentration camp survivor. Because of his detailed descriptions of sex and violence, he was dubbed the Slovene Hemingway and was compared to Henry Miller. He is best known for Menuet za kitaro (A Minuet for Guitar, 1975), describing the years he spent with the Slovene Partisans. In Titoist Yugoslavia he was sentenced to 18 years in a show trial, and upon his release in 1955 his works could only be published under his pseudonym Langus. He is considered one of the most important Slovene writers.

== Life ==
Zupan was born in Ljubljana, then part of Austria-Hungary. His mother was a teacher and his father, a soldier, was killed in the First World War. At age 18, Zupan played Russian roulette and shot a friend in the head, killing him. As a result, he was prohibited from graduating from secondary school in Yugoslavia. After leaving the country, he traveled for years—earning money as a sailor, ship's stoker, house painter in France, ski instructor, and professional boxer—across the Mediterranean, the Middle East, and North Africa, all before the outbreak of World War II. Upon returning home, he enrolled in the University of Ljubljana's Faculty of Engineering, which he did not graduate from, and read medical textbooks in an attempt to better understand his emotional condition.

After the Axis invasion of Yugoslavia in April 1941, as a member of the Sokol athletic movement he joined the Liberation Front and participated in its underground activities in the annexed Province of Ljubljana until the authorities sent him to the Gonars concentration camp in 1942.

After the capitulation of Italy, in 1943 he joined the Slovene Partisans, first in combat units and soon after in the cultural unit, where he was assigned to write resistance propaganda theater plays. After World War II, until 1947, when he fully dedicated himself to writing, he served at Radio Ljubljana as the cultural program's chief editor. For his novel Rojstvo v nevihti (Birth in a Storm) he was awarded his first Prešeren Award the same year. He married Nikolaja Dolenc and they had two sons, Dim Zupan and Martel Zupan; however, after the Tito–Stalin split in 1948, he was accused of anti-government conspiracy, spying, antipatriotic activity, immoral acts, murder, and attempted rape, and was sentenced in a show trial to almost twenty years in prison. He was released in 1955 and his two sons lived without their father, similar to his own childhood. He graduated from the University of Ljubljana in 1958.

He published his works for several years only under a pseudonym and was again able to publish under his name again from the 1960s onward. His best-known novel, Menuet za kitaro (Minuet for Guitar), was adapted by the Serbian director Živojin Pavlović for his 1980 film See You in the Next War (Slovene: Nasvidenje v naslednji vojni, Serbian: Doviđenja u sledećem ratu) and Zupan received his second Prešeren Award—this time for lifetime achievement.

Zupan died in Ljubljana in 1987 and is buried in the Žale cemetery.

== Work ==
Vitomil Zupan is best known for his semi-autobiographical novels centered on the quest of an individual for his identity in the modern world. He gave an idiosyncratic description of the years he spent with the Slovene Partisans in his 1975 novel Menuet za kitaro (Minuet for Guitar), described the ruthless environments in repressive institutions, such as the army and the prison in the 1982 novel Levitan, and described the period before and during World War II in the third part of his trilogy, Komedija človeškega tkiva (A Comedy of Human Tissue).

In the 1978 novel Igra s hudičevim repom (A Game with the Devil's Tail), he wrote about a middle-aged man who becomes involved in a sexual affair with his housekeeper, filled with depictions of sexuality and the banality of everyday life, because of which he was accused of pornography. However, his novels were also filled with philosophical and cultural references, and he wrote poetry, most of which remained unpublished during his lifetime. A collection of Zupan's poetry from his prison years was first published in 2006 and revived interest in Zupan's literary legacy.

He also wrote the children's book Potovanje v tisočera mesta (Travelling to a Thousand Cities; NIP "Kosmos", 1956).

== Reception and legacy ==
The Yugoslav critics were part of official Titoist nomenclature, and rejected his bohemian style and freethinking attitude and accused his writings of being decadent, cynical, and a glorification of evil, amorality, and nihilism.

Alternative Slovene writers and literary thinkers, such as Dušan Pirjevec Ahac and Taras Kermauner, were influenced by Zupan's work and they challenged the Titoist cultural policies. The echos of Zupan's vitalism and anticonformism can be seen in the works of the writer and essayist Marjan Rožanc, who reflected on Zupan in his 1983 novel-like essay Roman o knjigah (A Novel about Books). He also influenced the poet Borut Kardelj.

== Selected bibliography ==
- Rojstvo v nevihti (1943). Birth in a Storm
- Potovanje na konec pomladi (1972). Journey to the End of Spring
- Bele rakete lete na Amsterdam (1973). White Rockets Fly to Amsterdam
- Klement (1974)
- Menuet za kitaro: Na petindvajset strelov (1975). Minuet for Guitar (in Twenty-Five Shots), trans. Harry Leeming (Dalkey Archive, 2011)
- Igra s hudičevim repom (1978). A Game with the Devil's Tail
- Komedija človeškega tkiva (1980). A Comedy of Human Tissue
- Levitan (1982)
- Potovanje v tisočera mesta (1983). Travelling to a Thousand Cities
- Apokalipsa vsakdanjosti (1988). Apocalypse of the Everyday

== Sources ==
- "Interview with Taras Kermauner on Slovenian National TV (February 3, 2008)". RTV SLO. Archived from the original on 11 April 2008.
- "Vitomil Zupan: Stvar Jurija Trajbasa". Absolventi PefMB.
- Vesna Milek, "Pesmi zoper smrt: portret Vitomila Zupana" in Delo 48(114) (20 May 2006): 26–28.
- Bernard Nežmah, "Vitomil Zupan, Levitan: ponatis legendarnega dela iz leta 1982" in Mladina (13 May 2002): 81.
- Alenka Puhar, "Pesmi starega restanta: Zupanovo zbrano zaporniško delo" in Delo 48(111) (17 May 2006): 15.
- Marjan Rožanc, Roman o knjigah (Ljubljana: Slovenska matica, 1983).
