= Jože Pogačnik =

Slovenian filmmaker (1932–2016)

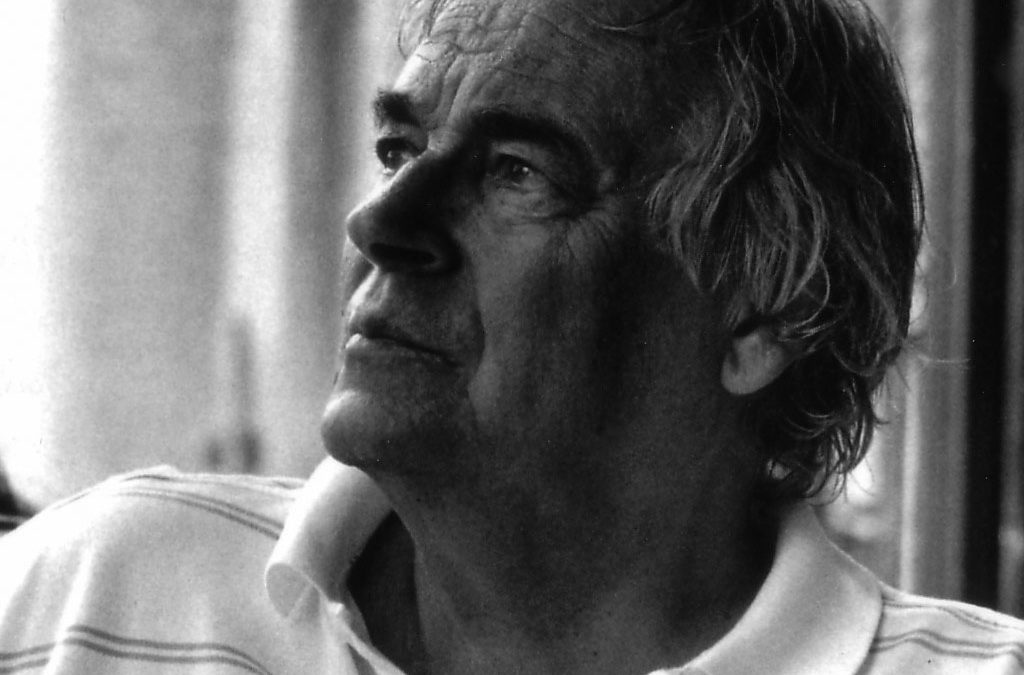
- Born: 22 April 1932; Maribor, Kingdom of Yugoslavia (now Slovenia)
- Died: 16 February 2016 (aged 83); Ljubljana, Slovenia
- Years active: 1960–1989

Jože Pogačnik (22 April 1932 – 16 February 2016) was a Slovenian film director and screenwriter.

After studying film directing, Pogačnik first worked as a film critic, before becoming a prominent author of documentary films in the 1960s, mainly dealing with social issues. He also made several short films, including Tri etide za Cathy i Miloša, which won the Silver Bear award at the 1972 Berlin International Film Festival.

In 1967 he made his first feature film Stronghold of Toughs (Slovenian: Grajski biki), and he won the Golden Arena for Best Director for his last feature film Cafe Astoria (Kavarna Astoria, 1989) at the 1989 Pula Film Festival.

== Selected filmography ==
- Stronghold of Toughs (Grajski biki, 1967)
- Cafe Astoria (Kavarna Astoria, 1989)
