= Menuet za kitaro =

1975 novel by Vitomil Zupan

- 1980 edition
- Author: Vitomil Zupan
- Language: Slovenian
- Genre: Novel, Historical Fiction, War Fiction
- Publisher: DZS
- Publication date: 1975
- Publication place: Slovenia
- Media type: hardcover
- Pages: 426
- ISBN: 978-8634124699

Menuet za kitaro is a novel by Slovenian author Vitomil Zupan. It was first published in 1975.

== See also ==
- List of Slovenian novels
