= Dominik Smole =

Slovenian writer and playwright

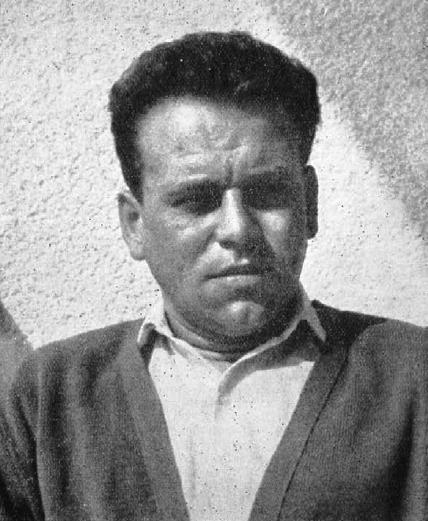
- Born: 24 August 1929; Ljubljana, Kingdom of Serbs, Croats, and Slovenes (now in Slovenia)
- Died: 29 July 1992 (aged 62); Ljubljana, Slovenia
- Occupations: Writer, playwright
- Writing career
- Notable work: Antigona
- Literary movement: Existentialism

Dominik Smole (24 August 1929 – 29 July 1992) was a Slovenian writer and playwright.

== Biography ==
Smole was born in Ljubljana in what was then the Kingdom of Serbs, Croats, and Slovenes. He attended school in Ljubljana and after the end of World War II he was employed as a broadcaster at Radio Primorska (Radio Slovenian Litoral), which was set up in Ajdovščina by the Yugoslav occupation authorities of the Julian March. He later returned to Ljubljana and worked as stage director at the Slovene Youth Theatre and later at the Drama Theatre. There he met Jože Javoršek, Žarko Petan and Bojan Štih who influenced him in searching for new modes of expression in theatre.

In the mid-1950s we worked at Stage '57, an alternative theatre set up by young Slovenian artists and authors, which introduced more modern approaches to Slovene theatre. Smole belonged to the so-called Critical generation, a group of talented young intellectuals, mostly from Ljubljana, who tried to challenge the rigid and repressive cultural policies of the Titoist regime in Slovenia. After the demise of the group, which came with the imprisonment of Jože Pučnik and the suppression of the Stage '57 and the group's two literary magazines, Revija 57 and Perspektive, Smole retreated into private life. For some years he worked as a manual worker, in protest against the regime repression of free speech, but later dedicated to writing. During this time he maintained strong contacts with the dissident poet and thinker Edvard Kocbek, who strongly encouraged him to pursue his literary career.

Smole spent most of his life in Ljubljana, working as a free-lance writer most of his life. He died in Ljubljana in 1992 and is buried in the Žale cemetery.

== Work ==
Smole was not a prolific writer: he did not create a large oeuvre, but his works are nevertheless regarded as the peak of modern Slovene literature. He was a crucial collaborator of the literary and cultural magazines that struggled to open a space for public debate in Communist Slovenia in the 1960s.

The central part of Smole's opus was published in the literary journal Beseda between 1951 and 1957, mostly as short stories with an urban theme, psychological and moral portraits of people and relationships, moral uncertainties and confusions of contemporary man. The stories include Mala novoletna zgodba (A Short New Year Story), Pismo iz mesteca v mesto (A Letter from a Small Town to a Big Town), Roman Gize Tikveš (Giza Tikveš's Novel), Večerni letoviščarski sprehod brez dogodka (An Uneventful Holiday Evening Strol). His main novel Črni dnevi in beli dan (Black Days and a White Day) (1958) was also created as a cycle of short stories; as a whole represents one of the most interesting Slovene literary works of its time. The novel also served as the literary basis for the film Ples v dežju (Dance in the Rain), directed by Boštjan Hladnik in 1961.

His main plays include Potovanje v Koromandijo (Travels to Neverland), Igre in igrice (Plays and Games), and Zlata čeveljčka (Little Golden Shoes). One of his most important plays is Krst pri Savici (adaptation of Prešeren's epic-lyric poem The Baptism on the Savica), a paraphrase of France Prešeren's major work with the same title, in which he used the setting of the Christianisation of the predecessors of the Slovenes in the 8th century to deliver a clear yet subtle metaphor of the political conditions in Slovenia after the Second World War. He employed the same scheme in his most important poetic play, Antigona (Antigone), written in 1961. The play is conceived as a remake of Sophocles' famous play, where everything revolves around an Antigone who never appears on the stage. Smole's Antigone thus uses the reference to one of the greatest myths of Ancient Greek literature as a clear allusion to the contemporary Slovene political and social situation and its main concealed secret, the summary killings of 12,000 Slovenian Home Guard members in May and June 1945, perpetrated by the Communist authorities. The play has also been translated into English.

Smole was a sharp thinker who lucidly analyzed his surroundings. Already during his lifetime, he was acclaimed for his refined expression and frequently referred to as a master of style. His works echo the existentialist issues of contemporary modern literature. His literature can be read both as a critical account of totalitarian reality, as well as a global metaphor on the tragic essence of the human condition.

== Sources ==
- Helga Glušič, Sto Slovenskih Pripovednikov (Ljubljana: Prešernova družba, 1996) ISBN 961-6186-21-3
- Taras Kermauner, Perspektivovci (Ljubljana: Znanestveno in publicistično središče, 1995).
- Miran Štuhec, Aristokracija duha in jezika (Ljubljana: Študentska založba, 2005).
