= The Serfs (play) =

Play by Ivan Cankar

The Serfs is a satirical play by Ivan Cankar; the Slovene title is Hlapci.

== Background ==
In 1907, an election took place in Austro-Hungary. After the clerical-conservative victory, Cankar, a renowned Slovenian writer and playwright, wrote this play condemning the "servants" that the people are; naming them "serfs".

== Censored ==
The play was censored by the Austro-Hungarian government over strikes regarding over 60 points in the text. Because of this, the play was not performed until 1919.
