= Ljubljana Puppet Theatre =

Coordinates: 46.0502°N 14.5101°E

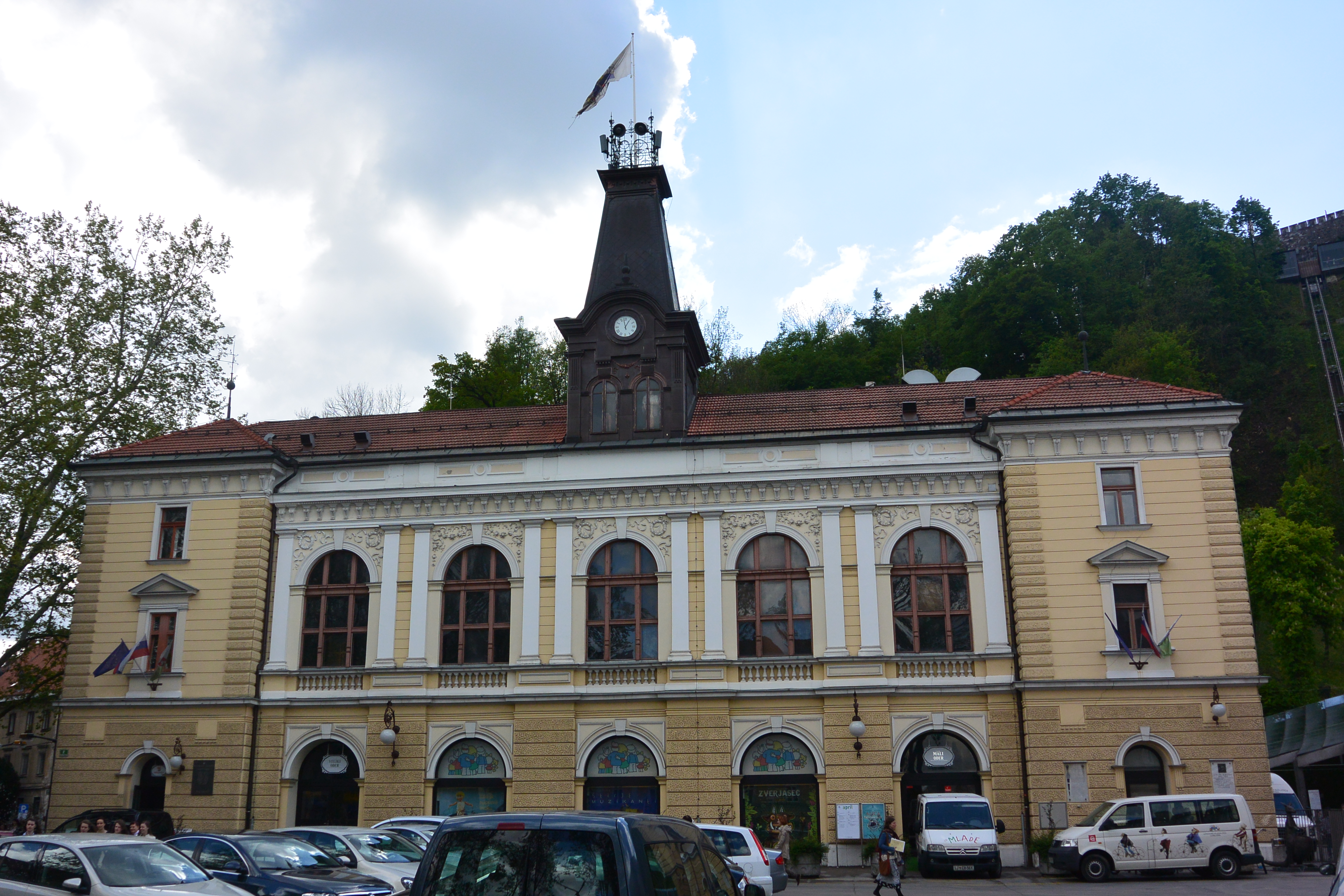
Šentjakobsko gledališče (St. James's Theatre) at Krekov Square houses the Ljubljana Puppet Theatre.

The Ljubljana Puppet Theatre (Slovenian: Lutkovno gledališče Ljubljana) was founded in 1948, originally as the City Puppet Theatre, and remains the premier Slovenian theatre for puppetry. It is located in Ljubljana, the capital of Slovenia. It had its opening premiere on October 10 as part of the Ljubljana Festival. The first artistic director was Jože Pengov, a Slovenian director, playwright, actor, writer, translator, publicist, and founder of the modern craft of Slovenian puppet theater. Today, the Theatre hosts and participates in numerous European and Slovenian festivals.

The theatre stages puppetry shows but also live-action dramas, musicals, and other performance entertainments.

The theatre has four stages accommodating between 60 and 210 seats: St Jacob's Stage, The Main Stage, Small Stage, and Stage Under the Stars located on the top floor with a glass roof up to the night skies.

The theatre also contains a small Museum of Puppetry which opened in 2015.
