= JobSerf =

Former employment out-sourcing system

JobSerf, Inc. was an employment service and job search outsourcing (JSO) company. It was founded in 2004 by three Dallas executives: Jay Martin, Phil Miller, and David Micek. Jay Martin is a former Strategy and Supply Chain Consultant who worked for Arthur D. Little, IBM and PepsiCo. Phil Miller is a Dallas-based Financial Executive and former CFO. David Micek has been a CEO of multiple companies, and was also the president of internet leader AltaVista. In 2004, JobSerf was the first company to demonstrate the feasibility of job search outsourcing.

== Job Search Outsourcing ==
JobSerf took the work of searching for and applying to jobs on employment websites such as Craigslist or CareerBuilder and outsourced these tasks to offshore resources.

The types of service that JSO's provide include general information (e.g. books, articles), customized or tailored advice (e.g. coaching, profile specific information) and tools (e.g. products and services which aim to facilitate easier or more effective job searching by the candidate). Companies like JobSerf aim to take ownership and complete the execution of the task of online job searching.

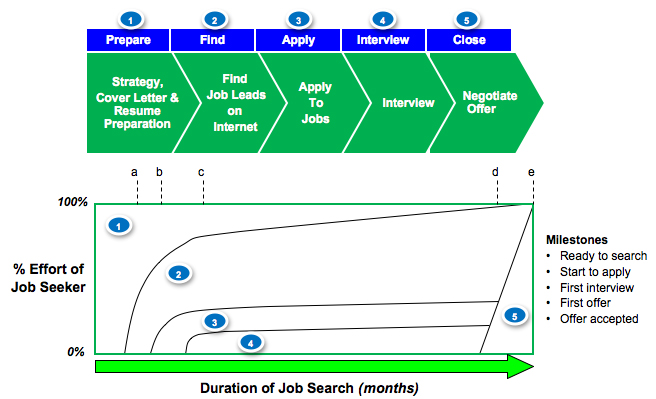
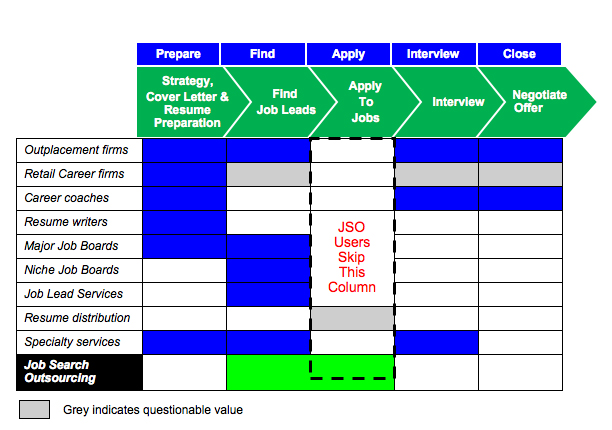

=== Process ===
Typically, a job seeker would sign-up on JobSerf's website, and then provide JobSerf with information regarding where to reach them, search focus, past experience and job boards. Users must define their objectives in their job search. Objectives include facets such as geographic area, industries, functional expertise, career level and salary requirements.

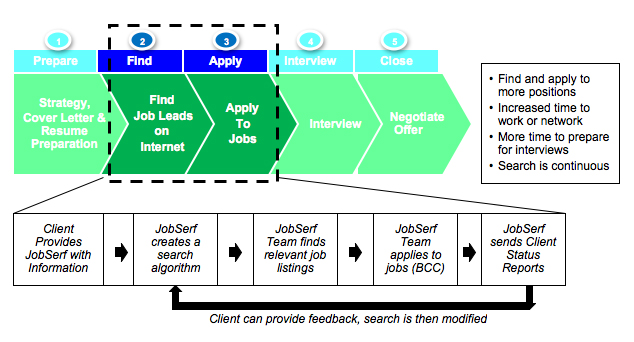
After this is completed, users create between 1 and 5 targeted résumés and cover letters for each type of position. The company used a ‘fill-in’ concept on the cover letters to provide semi-customization when applying to jobs. The company then created a search algorithm of keywords and websites to conduct deep searches for jobs on the internet. The jobs found were then applied to with the provided cover letters and résumés via the user's email address. The company had redundancy controls to prevent applying to those companies and websites that a user advises them to avoid.

== Email Address Technology ==
JobSerf utilized a proprietary technology allowing it to send and receive emails using users' addresses without accessing their personal information. This approach let the company apply for jobs on behalf of jobseekers, making it seem as though the applications were directly from the candidates. Emails appeared with the customer's name, and replies were received directly by the customer, not JobSerf.
