= Avgust Pirjevec =

Slovene literary scholar, lexicographer and librarian

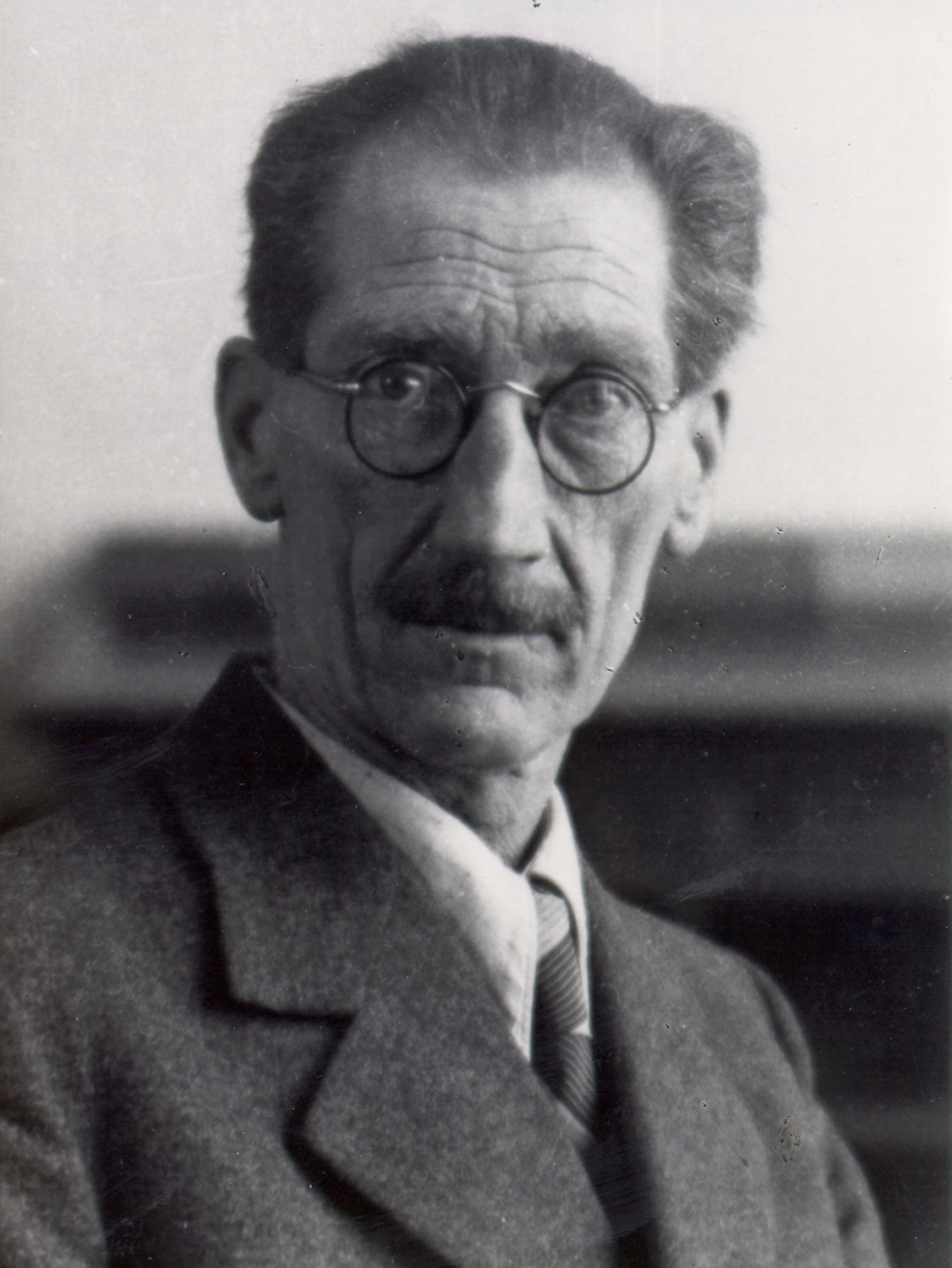
- Born: September 28, 1887; Gorizia, Kingdom of Italy
- Died: December 9, 1943 (aged 56); Gusen concentration camp, Nazi Germany

Academic background
- Education: University of Vienna

Academic work
- Discipline: Literacy; Lexicography

Avgust Pirjevec (28 September 1887 – 9 December 1943) was a Slovene literary scholar, lexicographer, and librarian.

== Biography ==
Pirjevec was born in a Slovene-speaking family in Gorizia, a town in the Austrian Littoral (now part of Italy). He studied Slavic philology at the University of Vienna. He graduated in 1913 with a thesis on Fran Levstik. During World War I he served in the Austro-Hungarian Army. After the demobilization in 1917, he taught Slovene and German language at a Slovene-language high school in Trieste. In 1920, he was fired by the new Italian authorities in the Julian March. In 1921, he moved to Ljubljana, in what was then the Kingdom of Serbs, Croats and Slovenes, and became the chief librarian of the National Research Library. Between 1925 and 1927 he shortly worked at the Library of the National Museum.

In the 1920s and 1930s, Pirjevec published several treatises on Slovene literature in the 19th century, especially the Romantic circle of France Prešeren and Matija Čop. Together with Ivan Prijatelj and France Kidrič, Pirjevec was the main exponent of the positivist group of Slovenian literary historians of the interwar period. He was also important as a theoretician librarian; publishing numerous articles and monographs on the function and organization of libraries and library systems in modern societies. In addition, he wrote a cataloguing instruction manual for use by academic libraries.

During the interwar period, Pirjevec maintained a position of a progressive and national liberal intellectual. He was critical of the absolute monarchy of King Alexander I of Yugoslavia and supported the idea of an autonomous United Slovenia within the Kingdom of Yugoslavia. During World War II, his son Dušan Pirjevec became an important resistance leader of the Yugoslav partisans in Slovenia; his daughter Ivica Pirjevec was active in the Liberation Front of the Slovenian People and was killed by the Nazis in 1944. Because of the anti-Fascist activities of his children, Pirjevec was arrested by the Nazi authorities of the Province of Ljubljana and sent to the Mauthausen-Gusen concentration camp in autumn 1943. He died in the Gusen concentration camp in December 1944.

After the war, a bust of Pirjevec was erected in the main entrance hall of the National and University Library of Slovenia.
