= Žarko Petan =

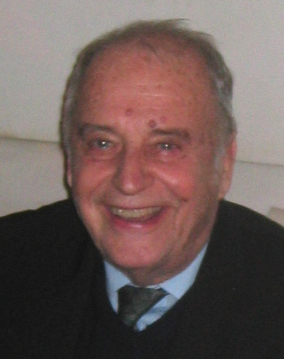
Žarko Petan

Žarko Petan (27 March 1929 – 2 May 2014) was a Slovenian writer, essayist, screenwriter, and theatre and film director. He is best known as a writer of aphorisms.

Petan was born into a relatively wealthy urban middle-class family in Ljubljana, Slovenia, then part of the Kingdom of Yugoslavia. He spent his childhood in Zagreb, Croatia, where his father owned a hotel in the city centre. In 1940, the family moved to Maribor in Slovenia, where they owned a café. After the Axis invasion of Yugoslavia in 1941, they moved to Trieste to escape Nazi German persecution. After the end of World War II, they returned to Maribor.

Petan soon entered into conflict with the new Communist regime. In 1949, while serving in the Yugoslav People's Army, he was accused of enemy propaganda and sentenced to 9 years in jail. He was released in 1951, and enrolled in the University of Ljubljana, where he studied economics. After graduation, he enrolled in the Academy for Theatre, Radio, Film and Television in Ljubljana, where he studied theatre directing.

In the late 1950s, he worked with Jože Javoršek and Bojan Štih at the Drama theatre in Ljubljana, which was one of the first theatres to introduce the theatre of the absurd on Yugoslav stages. Together with Dominik Smole, Taras Kermauner and Dane Zajc, he was one of the co-founders of the alternative theatre Stage 57, which challenged the rigid cultural policies of the Titoist regime. After the abolition of the theatre by the authorities in 1964, Petan returned to the established theatres.

Between 1992 and 1994, he served as Director General of the Slovenian National Radio and Television Broadcast.

Žarko Petan was an extremely prolific writer. He has published more than 60 books in Slovene, and many others in other languages, especially in Croatian. His work has been translated into more than a dozen foreign languages. He died on 2 May 2014.
