= Bojan Štih =

Slovene literary critic, stage director and essayist

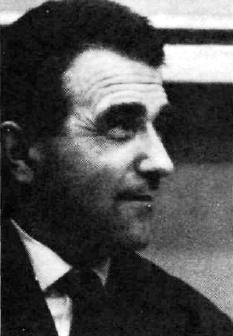
Bojan Štih

Bojan Štih (18 February 1923 – 14 October 1986), was a Slovene literary critic, stage director, and essayist. He was one of the most influential figures in modern Slovene theatre after 1945.

Štih was born in Ljubljana, where he attended Bežigrad High School. During World War II, he collaborated with the Liberation Front of the Slovenian People. In 1942 he was arrested by the Italian Fascist authorities and sent to the Gonars concentration camp. In late August 1942 he escaped from the camp along with a group of Slovene Communist activists, among whom was also the Partisan leader Franc Ravbar and Boris Kraigher, who later who became prime minister of the Socialist Republic of Slovenia. Štih actively participated in the Slovene Partisan resistance in the Julian March.

After the end of the war in 1945, he worked as a journalist and editor. In 1957, he received a bachelor's degree in history from the University of Ljubljana. The same year, he started working as a director at the Drama Theatre in Ljubljana, where he worked together with the playwright and author Jože Javoršek. In the 1960s, he worked in the majority of theatres in Slovenia, where he introduced contemporary western trends. He was also a prolific essayist.

He died in Ljubljana in 1986 and is buried in Žale Cemetery. Štih Hall (Štihova dvorana) in Cankar Hall, the largest cultural and congress centre in Slovenia, was named after him, as was Štih Street (Štihova ulica) in the Bežigrad district of Ljubljana.

He was the uncle of Barbara Brezigar, Slovene jurist and politician and current Chief Public Prosecutor of the Republic of Slovenia.

== Sources ==
- Jože Pogačnik, "Bojan Štih" in Slovenska misel: eseji o slovenstvu (Ljubljana: Cankarjeva založba, 1987), 470-71.
