= Srečko Kosovel =

Slovene poet

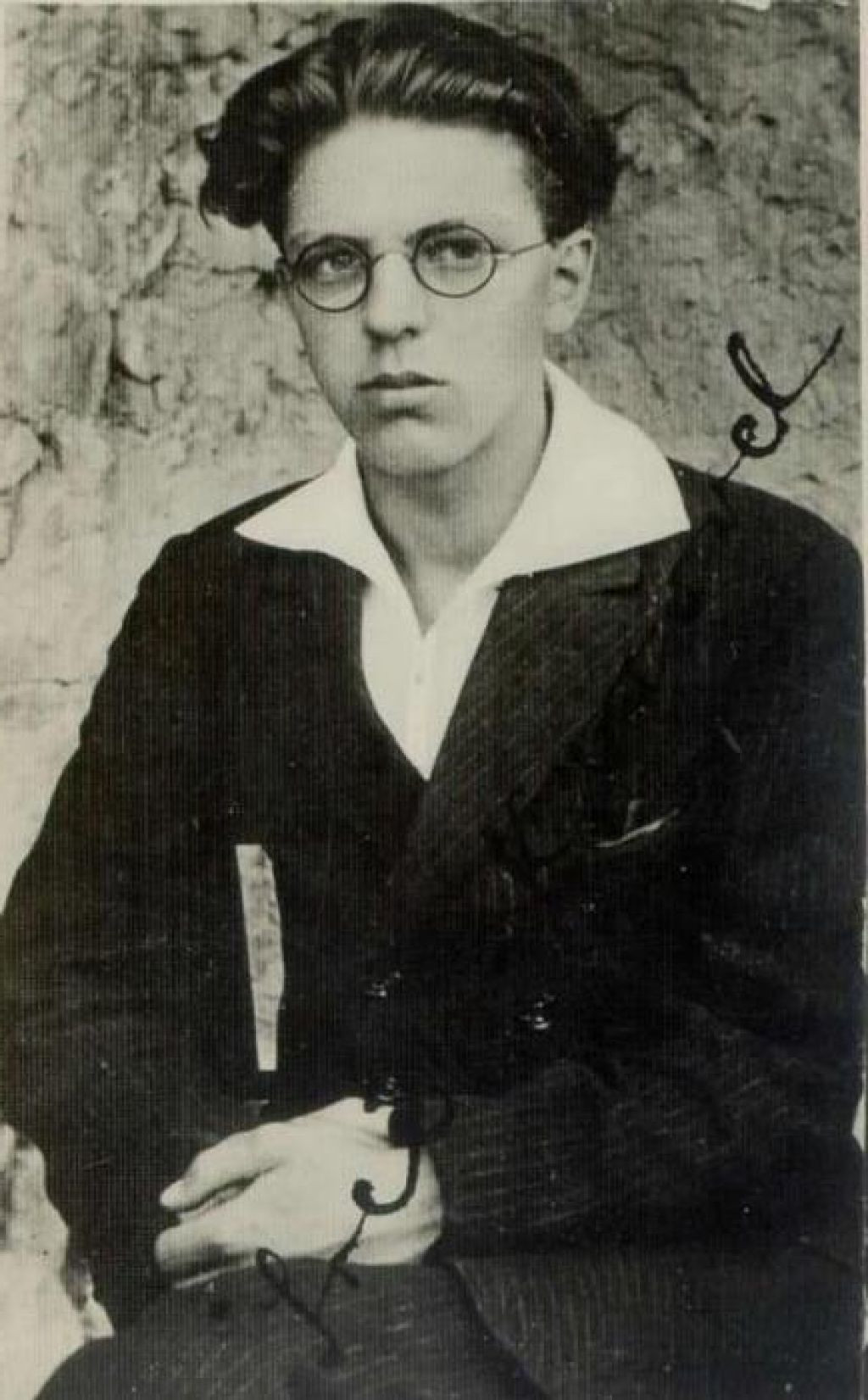
- Born: March 18, 1904; Sežana, Gorizia and Gradisca, Austria-Hungary (now in Slovenia)
- Died: May 27, 1926 (aged 22); Tomaj, Kingdom of Italy (now in Slovenia)
- Occupation: Poet
- Writing career
- Notable work: Konsi
- Literary movement: Impressionism, Expressionism, Constructivism

Srečko Kosovel (18 March 1904 – 27 May 1926) was a Slovenian poet, now considered one of central Europe's major modernist poets. He was labeled an impressionistic poet of his native Karst region, a political poet resisting forced Italianization of the Slovene areas annexed by Italy, an expressionist, a dadaist, a satirist, and as a voice of international socialism, using avant-garde constructivist forms. He is now considered a Slovenian poetic icon.

Most of Kosovel's works were published almost four decades after his early death at 22. In his homeland, Kosovel entered the 20th-century Slovene literary canon as a poet who produced an impressive body of work of more than 1000 drafts, among them 500 complete poems, with a quality regarded as unusually high for his age.

== Life ==
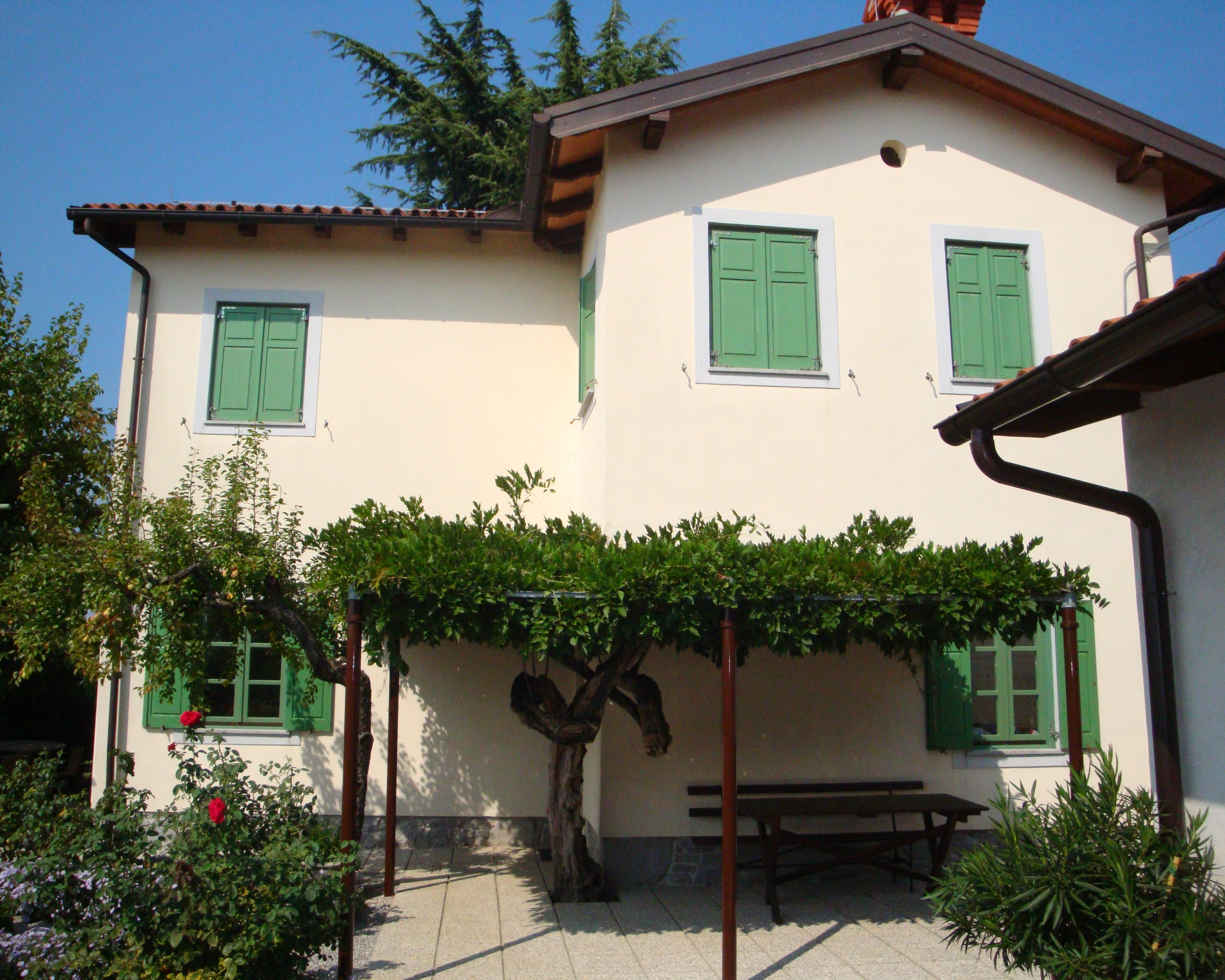
The house in Tomaj where Kosovel spent his childhood

Srečko Kosovel was born as the youngest of five children to father Anton Kosovel, a Slovene teacher, who was not allowed to continue teaching in the Slovene language after the Austrian Littoral was annexed by Italy with the Treaty of Rapallo, 1920, and mother Katarina (née Streš) who was 40 years old at the time of his birth and nurtured the artistic talents of their children. Kosovel's sister played the piano and one of his brothers was an aspiring writer. Born in Sežana, then part of the Austro-Hungarian Empire, Kosovel lived in the nearby village of Tomaj until 1924.

Before the annexation of his native Karst region by Italy, he familiarized himself with works of Slovene culture in general, especially Slovene literature, as well as drama at the Slovene theatre in Trieste, housed in the Trieste National Hall, the cultural center of Slovenes in Trieste.

Kosovel has been compared to Rimbaud, sharing the young age at which they were exposed to human suffering during war. The Battles of the Isonzo—one of the worst engagements of the First World War, began when Kosovel was 12 and officially ended when he was 17—were near Kosovel's native village, and Rimbaud's native village was near the battles of the Franco-Prussian War. Kosovel had regular contacts with wounded soldiers and saw corpses because the battlefield was only some 15 kilometers from his home, which had a traumatizing effect on him. His parents wanted him to be removed from the vicinity of the war, and so in 1916 both he and his sister moved to Ljubljana, where he stayed until his early death.

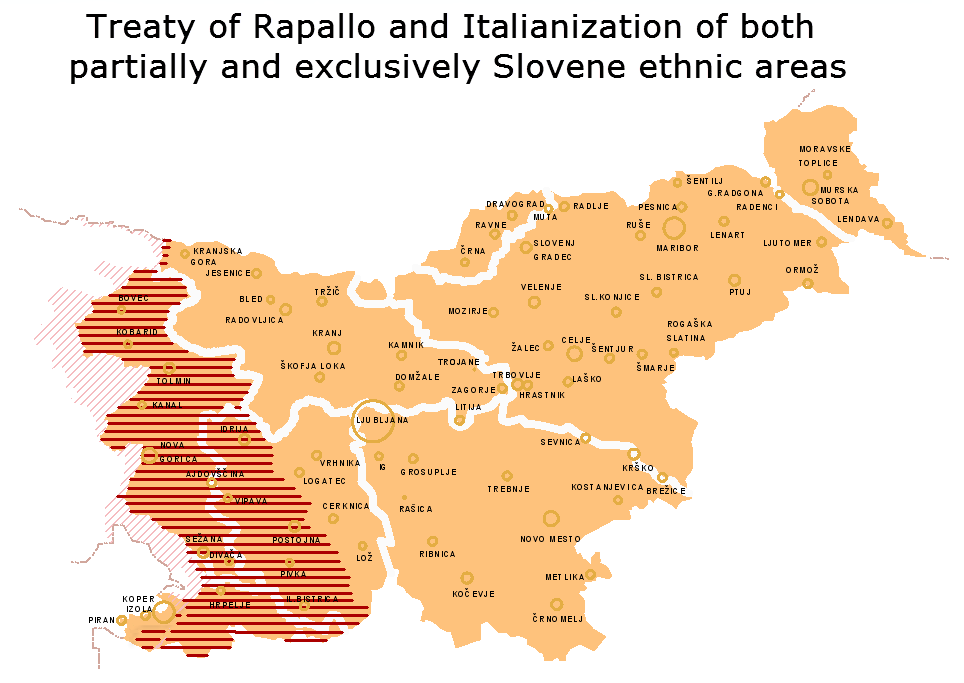
The Treaty of Rapallo and the Italianization of ethnic Slovene areas, which included a quarter of Slovene ethnic territory and approximately 327,000 out of a total population of 1.3 million Slovenes, on the map of present-day Slovenia with its traditional regions' boundaries.

With the Treaty of Rapallo and Italian annexation of Slovene territories, including his native Karst region, Kosovel felt robbed of his beloved landscape because this and all Slovene schools and organizations were forbidden by the Fascist regime. Slovene intellectuals were subjected to reprisals, and this has been called one of the tragedies of his short life, evoking in him grief, anger, displacement, and disorientation. This was especially because his new homeland, the Kingdom of Yugoslavia, also showed no interest in the suffering of the Slovene minority under the Fascist regime in Italy. Even in his negotiations with Italy in 1923, when Benito Mussolini wanted to modify the Rapallo borders in order for Italy to annex the still-independent state of Rijeka, King Alexander preferred "good relations" with Italy over the proposals for border corrections at Postojna and Idrija proposed by SHS Prime Minister Nikola Pašić. This led to Kosovel's political and artistic radicalization. He had contacts with the radical political and insurgent anti-Fascist organization TIGR. In 1926, he visited the Yugoslav town of Zagorje to perform one of his recitals, and while waiting for the train to return to Ljubljana caught a cold, which eventually developed into meningitis. He returned to his home village of Tomaj, where he died on 27 May 1926.

== Work ==
His early works were mainly about his feelings of longing for his family and native Karst landscape. Kosovel met his peers, Slovenes that have left Italy-annexed ethnic Slovene areas, at the University of Ljubljana and they established literary magazine called Lepa Vida ("The Fair Vida", a motive from Slovene folk poetry), where Kosovel served as the magazine's editor. Kosovel became acquainted with more radical ideas at the "Ivan Cankar Club", named after the Slovenian radical author, and increasingly became attracted by the revolutionary ideas and the avant-garde Soviet and German works that Ivo Grahor introduced him to.

=== The constructivist turn ===
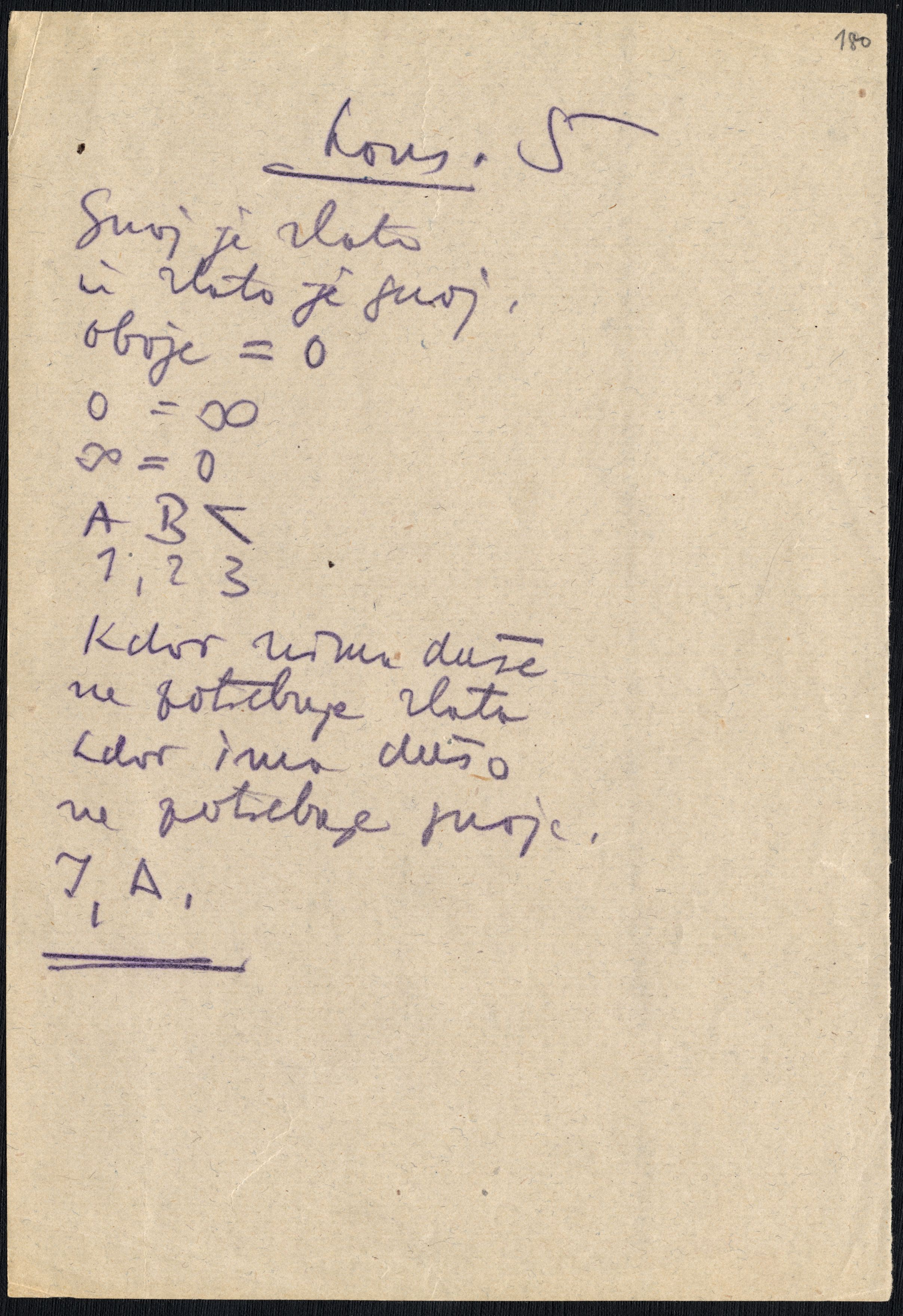
Manuscript of Kons 5, one of Kosovel's most famous late poems. It reads: Dung is gold and gold is dung. Both = 0 0 = ∞ ∞ = 0 AB < 1, 2, 3. Whoever has no soul doesn't need gold. Whoever has a soul doesn't need dung. EE-AW

In 1925, together with a constructivist artist Avgust Černigoj, Kosovel was considering establishing a new magazine Konstruktor ("Constructor") and started writing his constructivist poems, called konsi (kons in singular), short for konstrukcije ("constructions"). With the constructivism he turned away from a silent lyric to a loud, presumptuous, offensive poetry full of linguistic innovations: language free of syntax and logical ordering, freedom of imagery, use of typography, styles and colors, mathematical symbols, equations, paper collages, and all other sorts of experimental writing.

At about the same time, Kosovel prepared to publish a collection of his early poems, entitled Zlati čoln ("Golden Boat"). With this selection of poems, he intended to put an end to his early style, strongly influenced by the impressionist poetry of Josip Murn. He was however crushed by the negative response of both publishing houses and some of his closest friends.

Kosovel then turned exclusively to his constructivist poetry, which he wanted to publish in a collection entitled Konsi. He however never managed to achieve this; his constructivist poetry would remain unknown to the public until as late as 1967, when Anton Ocvirk decided to release Kosovel's collection under the title Integrali '26.

The same year, in 1925, Kosovel became editor of the magazine Mladina (Youth). This had an enormous impact on his life: he had very ambitious plans with the journal, intending to transform it into a nationwide left-wing publication that would attract all modernist and avant-gardiste artists from Slovene Lands and Yugoslavia, as well as serving as the platform for a radical Slovenian political agenda. He remained the programme editor of the paper until his death.

=== Late works ===
The year 1925 was Kosovel's most productive period. It was also a time that saw him shift his politics to the left. As his prose became simpler in style, it had a greater appeal to the proletariat. Kosovel conceived the idea of a proletarians' writers union and a publishing house called Strelci ("Archers"), in which his collection of constructivist poetry could also be published.

== Reception ==
The poetry of Kosovel is seen to come from three artistic movements: Impressionism, Expressionism and Constructivism. Kosovel's poetry also incorporates elements with Dadaism, Surrealism and Futurism. His style is too complex to be identified by a particular movement or current. His works show his concern with social and political oppression in the Slovene Lands, the fate of Slovenes threatened by foreign powers, the feeling of a decadence of Europe and the hope for a "new dawn". The Karst region, with its ascetic and rigid scenery, is one of the main motifs in Kosovel's poetry. His verses are full of wit, irony, depth and a sentiment of tragedy.

He has been often compared to other brilliant and tragic European authors from his same generation, such as the Hungarian Attila József, Italian Cesare Pavese, or Spanish Federico García Lorca.

Slovene composer Breda Šček set Kosovel’s texts to music.

=== Posthumous publications ===
In 1927, Alfonz Gspan published his late friend's early poems in a booklet consisting of 66 works. In 1946, Anton Ocvirk published Kosovel's "Collected Works", which were received by interest from the literary community. Ocvirk further published "The Golden Boat" in 1954. These publications however omitted Kosovel's late works. Only in 1967, a book called "Integrals '26" was published, edited by Ocvirk. The third volume of "Collected Works" was published in 1977.

Kosovel also left unfinished works in lyrical prose form, sketches, note, diaries and essays and criticisms concerning cultural problems. Much of it was published in 2004, on the 100th anniversary of Kosovel's birth, in the monograph entitled Ikarjev sen ("Icarus'es Dream"), edited by the literary critics Aleš Berger and Ludwig Hartinger.

A new selection of Kosovel's poetry has been translated into English by Bert Pribac, David Brooks, assisted by Teja Brooks Pribac: "The Golden Boat: Selected Poems of Srečko Kosovel" (Salt 2008). Many further works by Srečko Kosovel have been translated into English by Lesley Zore: "Best of Srečko Kosovel's Work, Translated by Lesley Zore" (self-published, 2020-2021).
