= Alamut (Bartol novel) =

Novel by Vladimir Bartol

- Cover of the English translation of the novel.
- Author: Vladimir Bartol
- Original title: Alamut
- Translator: Michael Biggins
- Language: Slovene
- Genre: Historical fiction
- Publisher: Scala House Press
- Publication date: 1938
- Publication place: Kingdom of Yugoslavia
- English publication date: 2004
- Media type: Print
- ISBN: 0-9720287-3-0
- OCLC: 55518032
- Dewey Decimal: 891.8/435 22
- LC Class: PG1918.B33 A7813 2004

Alamut is a novel by Vladimir Bartol, first published in 1938 in Slovenian, dealing with the story of Hassan-i Sabbah and the Hashshashin, and named after their Alamut fortress. The maxim of the novel is "Nothing is an absolute reality; all is permitted". This book was one of the inspirations for the video game series Assassin's Creed.

Bartol first started to conceive the novel in the early 1930s, when he lived in Paris. In the French capital, he met with the Slovene literary critic Josip Vidmar, who introduced him to the story of Hassan-i Sabbah. A further motivation for the novel came from the assassination of Alexander I of Yugoslavia perpetrated by Croatian and Bulgarian radical nationalists, on the alleged commission of the Italian fascist government. When it was originally published, the novel was sarcastically dedicated to Benito Mussolini.

== Plot ==
The novel is set in the 11th century at the fortress of Alamut, which was seized by the leader of the Ismailis, Hassan-i Sabbah or Sayyiduna (سیدنا, "Our Master"). At the start of the story, he is gathering an army for the purpose of attacking the Seljuk Empire, which has taken over possession of Iran. The story opens from the point of view of Halima who was purchased by Hassan to become a houri. The story commences with the journey of young ibn Tahir, who is, according to his family's wish, intending to join the Alamut garrison. There, he is appointed to the squad of the most valiant soldiers, named the fedai (فدائی). Fedai are expected to obey orders without demur and forfeit their lives if necessary. During their demanding training, they come to be convinced that they shall go to heaven immediately after their death if they die in the line of duty. Meanwhile, Halima joins the other houris in the garden which Hassan has been building, the young girls are educated in various arts by the leader of the houris and confidant to Hassan, Miriam. Hassan managed to achieve such level of obedience by deceiving his soldiers; he gave them drugs (hashish) to numb them and afterwards ordered that they be carried into the gardens behind the fortress—which were made into a simulacrum of heaven, including houris. Therefore, fedayin believe that Allah has given Hassan the power to send anybody to Heaven for a certain period. Moreover, some of the fedayin fall in love with houris, and Hassan unscrupulously uses that to his advantage.

Meanwhile, the Seljuk army besieges Alamut. Some of the soldiers are captured and Hassan decides to demonstrate his power to them. He orders a pair of fedayin (Yusuf and Suleiman) to kill themselves; Suleiman by stabbing himself, Yusuf by jumping off a tower. They gladly fulfill their master's order since they believe that they will soon rejoice with their beloved in heaven. After the siege, Hassan orders ibn Tahir to go and kill the grand vizier of the Seljuk sultan Nizam al-Mulk. Hassan wants to take revenge for al-Mulk's treachery against him long ago. Ibn Tahir stabs the vizier, but, before he passes away, the vizier reveals the truth of Hassan's deceptions to his murderer. Upon hearing of his success, Hassan informs Miriam that Ibn Tahir is likely dead as a result of discovery, Miriam commits suicide from her disillusionment. Halima also commits suicide when she learns she will never be with Suleiman whom she fell in love with. Ibn Tahir decides to return to Alamut and kill Hassan. When ibn Tahir returns, Hassan receives him and also reveals him his true motto: "Nothing is an absolute reality, all is permitted". Then, he lets ibn Tahir go, to start a long journey around the world. Another fedai kills the Seljuk Sultan and the Seljuk empire dissolves. The fight for the Seljuk throne begins. Hassan encloses himself in a tower, determined to work until the end of his days. He transfers the power over the Ismaelits to the hands of his faithful dai, military, and religious chiefs.

== Interpretations ==
Some of the contemporaneous literary critics, such as Lino Legiša, have interpreted it as an allegory of the TIGR, an organization formed in order to fight the Fascist Italianization in the former Austrian Littoral. Allegedly, Vladimir Bartol had sympathised with said organisation.

== Cultural impact ==
The novel and its plot were the inspiration for the popular Assassin's Creed series of video games. Many elements of the book's plot can be found in the first game, and the phrase from the novel under an alternative translation: "nothing is true; everything is permitted" is the guiding principle of the game's Assassin Brotherhood—who are the descendants of the Ismaili Hashashin.

The novel helped inspire the Assamite clan of the Vampire: The Masquerade tabletop game.

Author William S. Burroughs found fascination within the story of Hassan-i-Sabbah and included the motto, "Nothing is true; everything is permitted", and many references to the work in his 1959 post-modern novel, Naked Lunch, and also in his novels The Nova Express and Cities of the Red Night.

Slovenian Avant-garde music group Laibach created a symphonic work based on this novel. The music is composed by Luka Jamnik of Laibach and also by Iranian composers; Nima A.Rowshan and Idin Samimi Mofakham. The piece also features some poems of Omar Khayam and Mahasti Ganjavi.

== Translations ==
The novel was published in English in 2004 in a Michael Biggins translation. Earlier it was translated into about 18 other languages including Czech (1946), Serbo-Croatian (1954), French (1988), Spanish (1989), Italian (1989), German (1992), Persian (1995), Arabic, Greek (2001), Korean and Slovak. More recently it has been translated into Hungarian (2005), Finnish (2008), Turkish (1998), Macedonian (2014), Lithuanian (2014), Bulgarian (2017), Portuguese (2019), Brazilian Portuguese (2022), and Polish (2022).

Written, in Persian, on the hand on the cover of the Michael Biggins translation are the words: "I Feel Sorry for the Garden No one is thinking about the flowers No one is thinking about the fish No one wants to believe that the garden is dying that the garden's heart has swollen under the sun that the garden is slowly forgetting its green moments ..."

== See also ==
- Joseph von Hammer-Purgstall, author of the 1835 nonfiction book The History of the Assassins, a likely influence on Bartol.
