= Slovene theatre in Trieste =

Theatre in Trieste, Italy

The Slovene Civic Theatre in Trieste (Slovene: Slovensko stalno gledališče; Italian: Teatro Stabile Sloveno) is the professional theatre of the Slovene minority in Trieste. The building was designed in the 1960s by Edo Mihevc, a Slovene architect of Trieste descent.

== History ==
On 8 March 1902, its predecessor, the Slovene Drama Society, was established in Trieste. In 1904, the theatre moved to the National Hall building. It had premiered 245 works by 1920, when it was burned by Italian Fascists, and it was prohibited during the Fascist Italianization period between the 1920s and 1945.

After World War II, the theater did not have its own fixed location until 1964, when it received its present location at Petronio Street no. 4. It premiered 254 works between the 1964/65 and 2003/04 seasons.

== Today ==
It is visited by students from schools with Slovene as the language of instruction, both from Trieste and in Littoral Slovenia. It also offers subtitles for visitors that speak only Italian.
