= Slovene Littoral =

Traditional region of Slovenia

Coordinates: 45°59′21.58″N 13°48′35.33″E

Slovene Littoral Primorska
- Traditional region
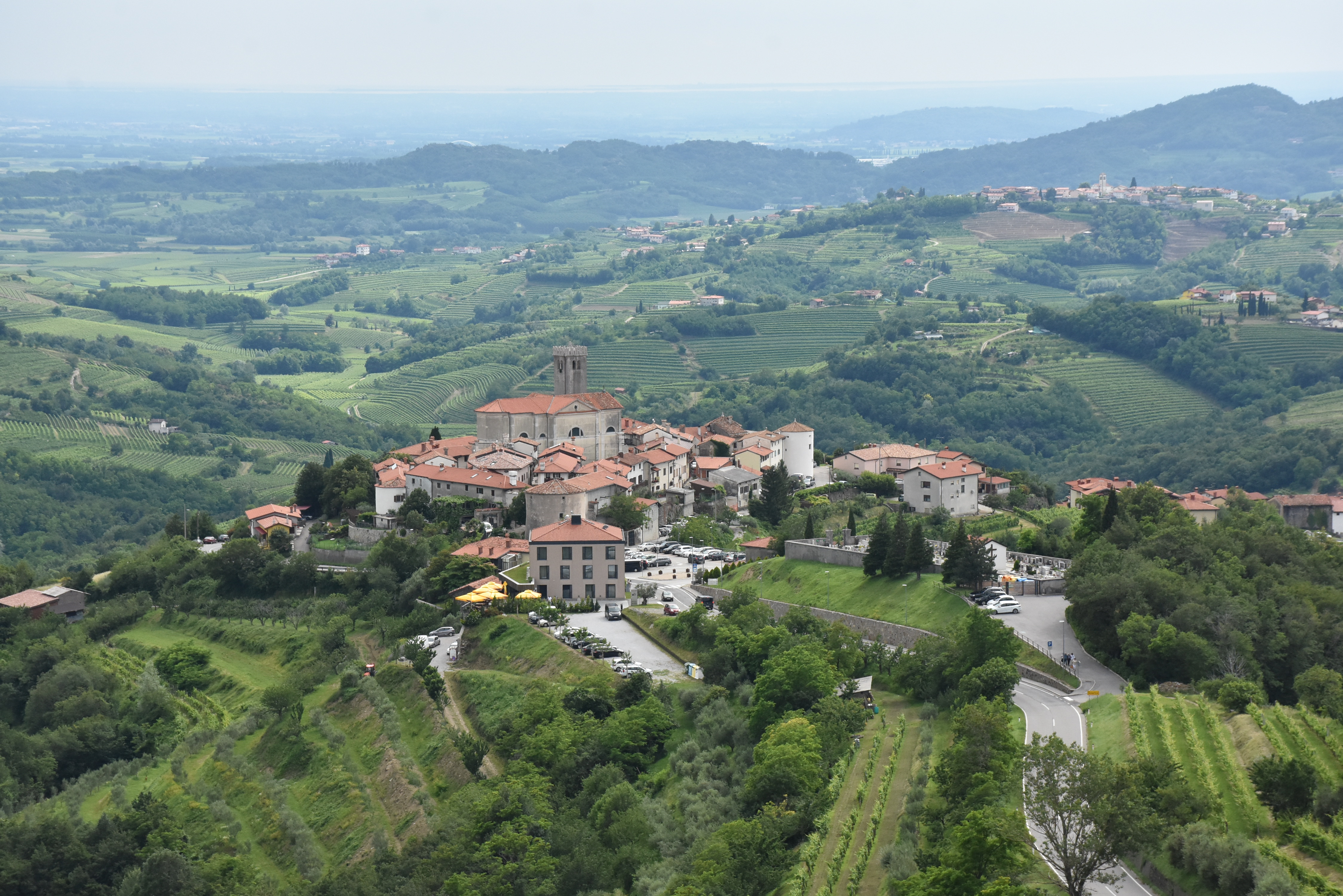
- Typical Littoral rural landscape in Šmartno
- Interactive map of Slovene Littoral
- Country: Slovenia

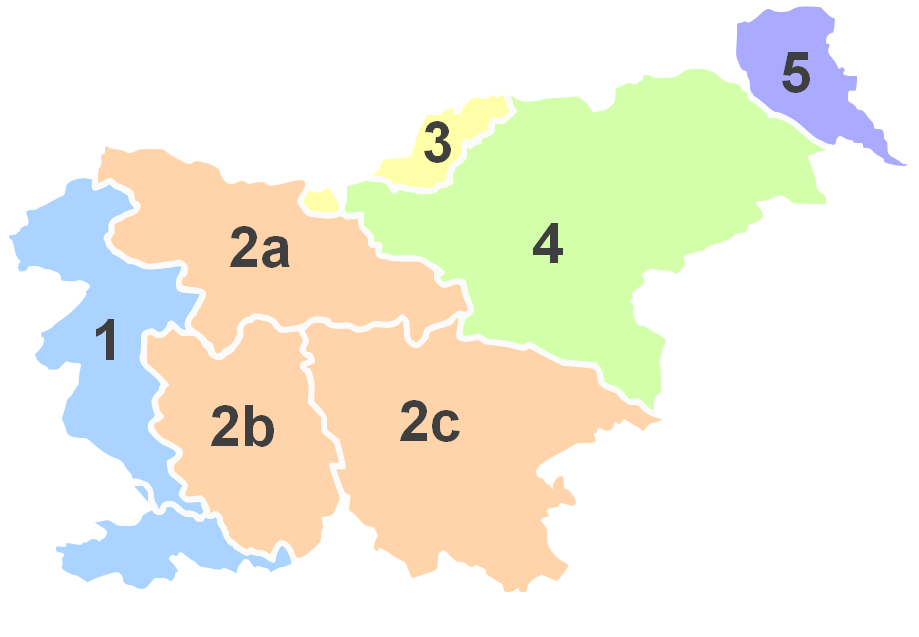
Traditional regions of Slovenia.: 1. Littoral; 2. Carniola: 2a Upper, 2b Inner, 2c Lower; 3. Carinthia; 4. Styria; 5. Prekmurje

The Slovene Littoral, or simply Littoral (Slovene: Primorska, pronounced [pɾiˈmóːɾska]; Italian: Litorale; German: Küstenland), is one of the traditional regions of Slovenia. The littoral in its name – for a coastal-adjacent area – recalls the former Austrian Littoral (Avstrijsko Primorje), the Habsburg possessions on the upper Adriatic coast, of which the Slovene Littoral was part. Today, the Littoral is often associated with the Slovenian ethnic territory that, in the first half of the 20th century, found itself in Italy to the west of the Rapallo Border, which separated a quarter of Slovenes from the rest of the nation, and was strongly influenced by Italian fascism.

== Geography ==
The region forms the westernmost part of Slovenia, bordering the inter-municipal union of Giuliana in the region of Friuli-Venezia Giulia of Italy. It stretches from the Adriatic Sea in the southwest up to the Julian Alps in the north, with the Danube–Adriatic watershed serving as the eastern border.

The Slovene Littoral comprises two traditional provinces: Goriška and Slovene Istria. The Goriška region takes its name from the town of Gorizia (Slovene: Gorica) now in Italy; the adjacent conurbation of Nova Gorica and Šempeter-Vrtojba today is the urban centre of the Slovene Littoral. Slovene Istria comprises the northern part of the Istrian peninsula, and it provides the country's only access to the sea on the Slovene Riviera coastline with the ports of Koper, Izola, and Piran.

After Ljubljana, the Slovene Littoral is the most developed and economically prosperous part of Slovenia. The western part of Slovene Istria is a bilingual region where both Slovene and Italian may be used in education, legal and administrative environments.

The northern part of the Slovene Littoral is part of the larger Gorizia Statistical Region, and the south belongs to the Coastal–Karst Statistical Region.

== History ==
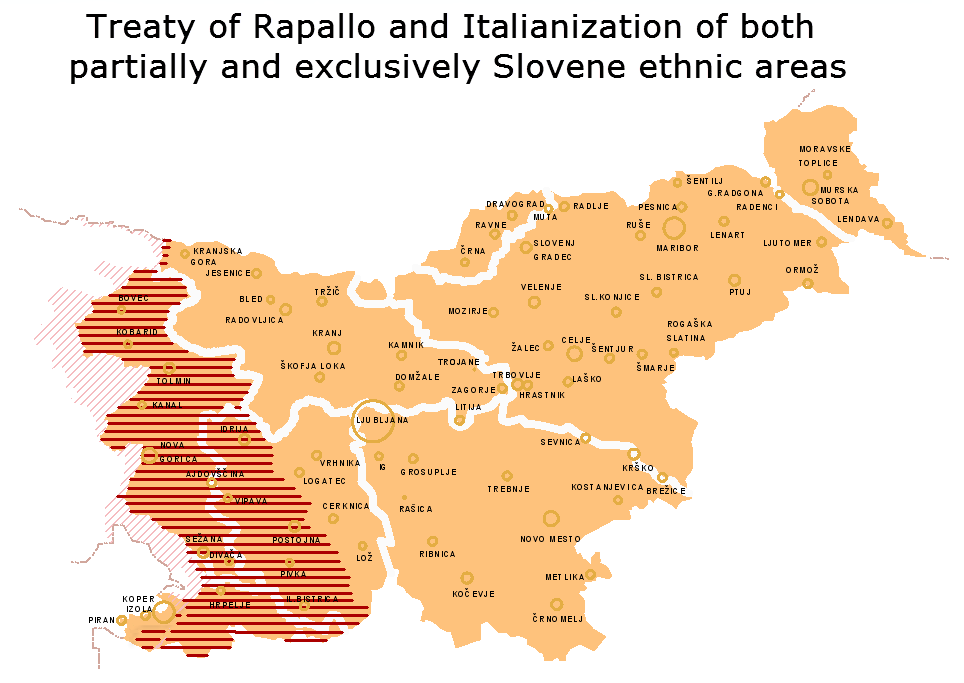
The annexed western quarter of Slovene ethnic territory, and approximately 327,000 out of the total population of 1.3 million Slovenes, were subjected to forced Fascist Italianization. On the map of present-day Slovenia with its traditional regions' boundaries.

After they had acquired the Carniola hinterland in 1335, the Habsburgs gradually took possession of the coastal areas. In the second half of the 14th century, they acquired Postojna and the Upper Vipava Valley from the Patriarchate of Aquileia, followed by Duino and parts of the Karst Plateau. These areas were annexed to Carniola, though they maintained a separate identity well into the Early Modern Age. In 1500 the Habsburgs inherited the comital lands of Gorizia (Görz), when the last Count Leonhard of Gorizia died childless. The Habsburg Princely County of Gorizia and Gradisca was established in 1754, it became part of the Austrian Kingdom of Illyria in 1816. With the Istrian march and the Imperial Free City of Trieste, it was re-arranged as the Austrian Littoral crown land in 1849.

At the end of World War I and the dissolution of Austria-Hungary in 1918, the area, together with the western part of Inner Carniola and the Upper Carniolan municipality of Bela Peč / Weissenfels (later Italianized to Fusine in Valromana, now a frazione of Tarvisio), was occupied by the Italian army. As stipulated in the 1915 London Pact, a quarter of predominantly Slovene ethnic territory and approximately 327,000 out of the total population of 1.3 million Slovenes were adjudicated to Italy by the 1919 Treaty of Saint-Germain and finally annexed according to the 1920 border Treaty of Rapallo.

Incorporated into the Julian March (Venezia Giulia) a forced Italianization of the Slovene minority began, intensified after the Fascists under Benito Mussolini came to power in 1922, and lasted until 1943. The Slovenes in Italy lacked any minority protection under international or domestic law. Numerous Slovenes emigrated to the Kingdom of Yugoslavia, others fought against Italian rule in the anti-fascist TIGR organization.

After World War II, according to the 1947 Paris Peace Treaties, the bulk of the region with the upper Soča (Isonzo) Valley fell to Yugoslavia. Parts of the area were re-arranged as the Free Territory of Trieste, while Italy retained the urban centres of Gorizia and Gradisca. In 1954 Italy also recovered the main port of Trieste. As a result, the new urban centres on the Slovenian side of the border developed.

== Gallery ==
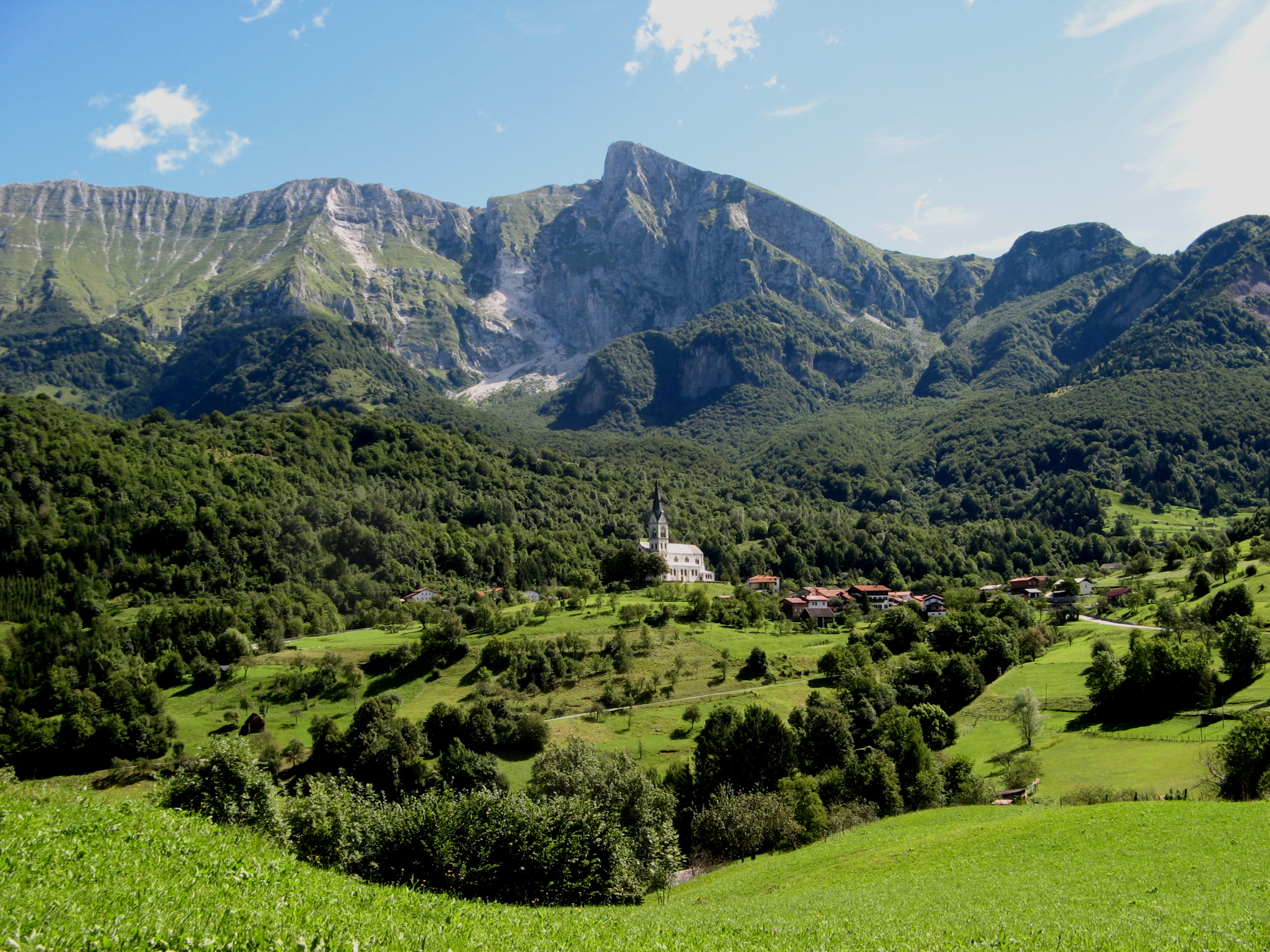
Mount Krn in the Julian Alps

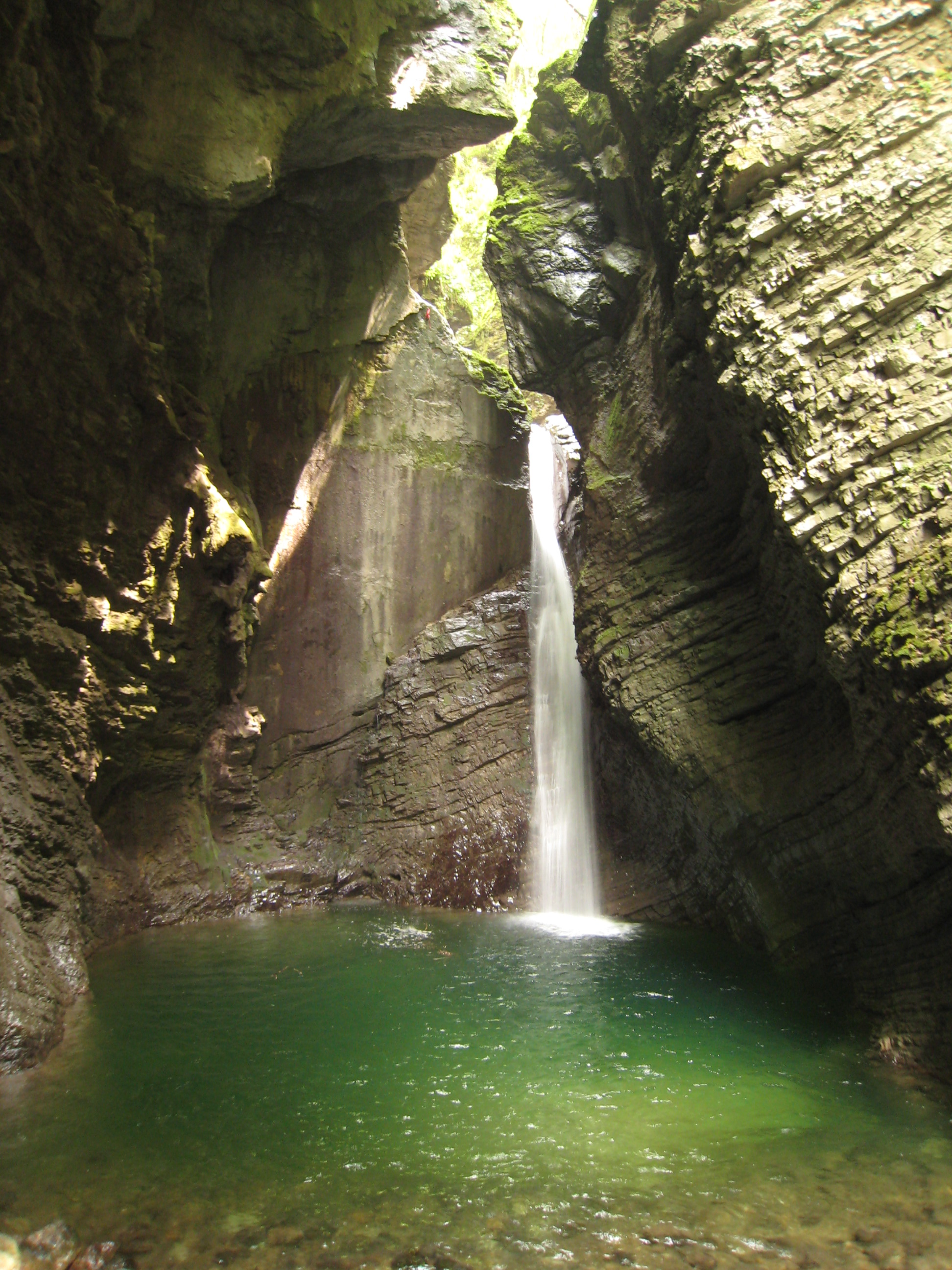
Kozjak Falls in the Soča Valley

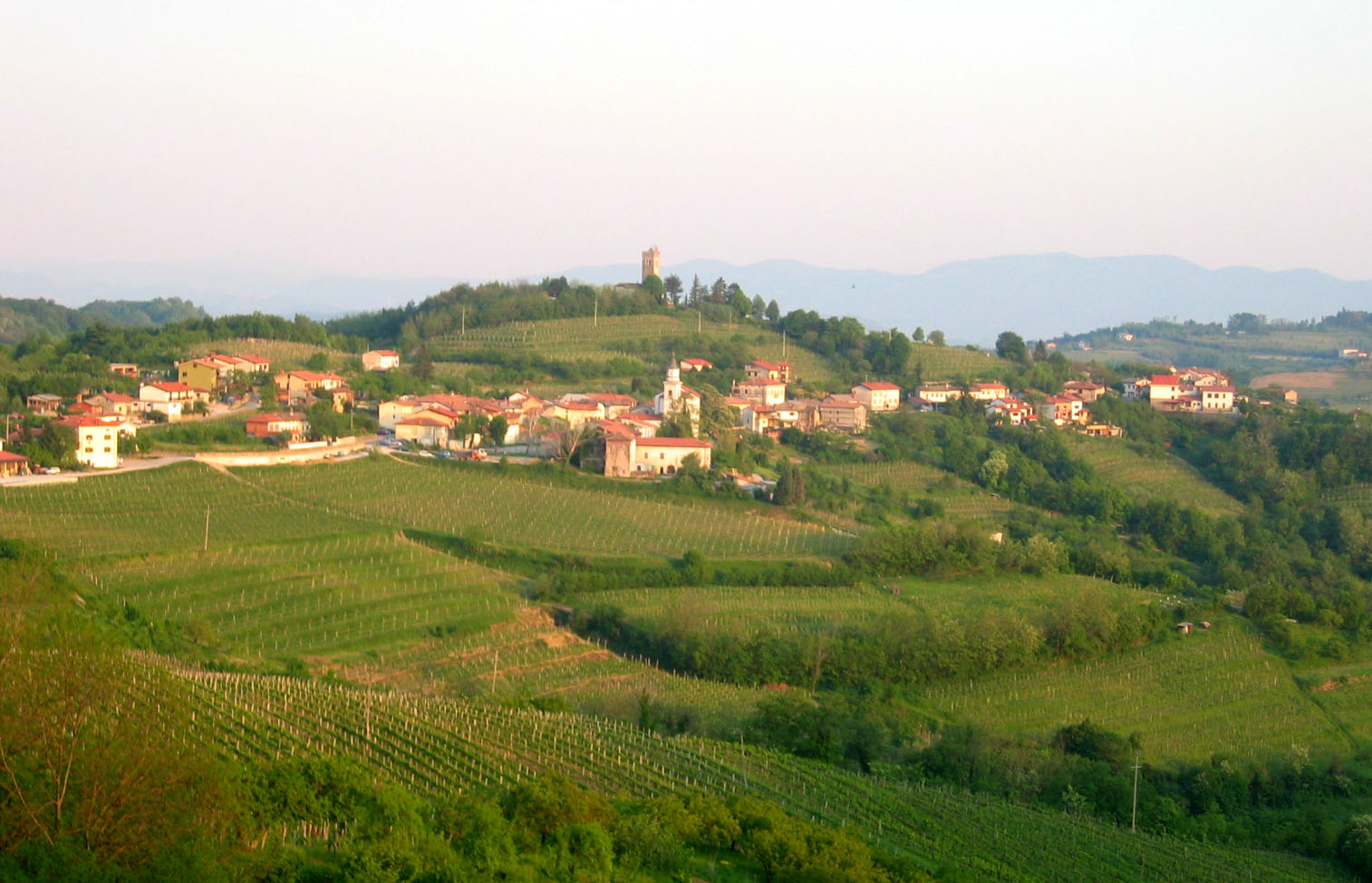
The Gorizia Hills wine region

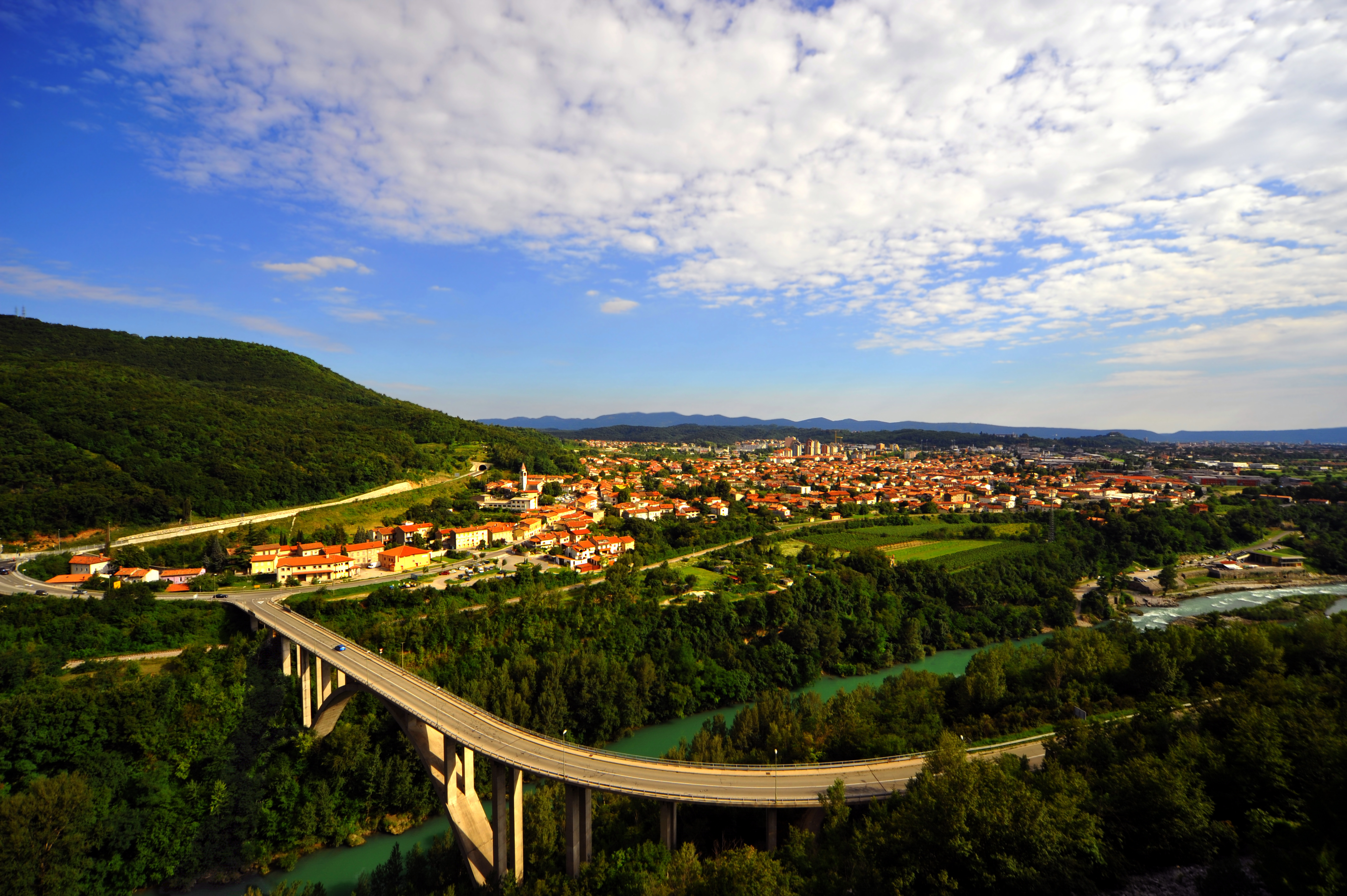
The town of Nova Gorica

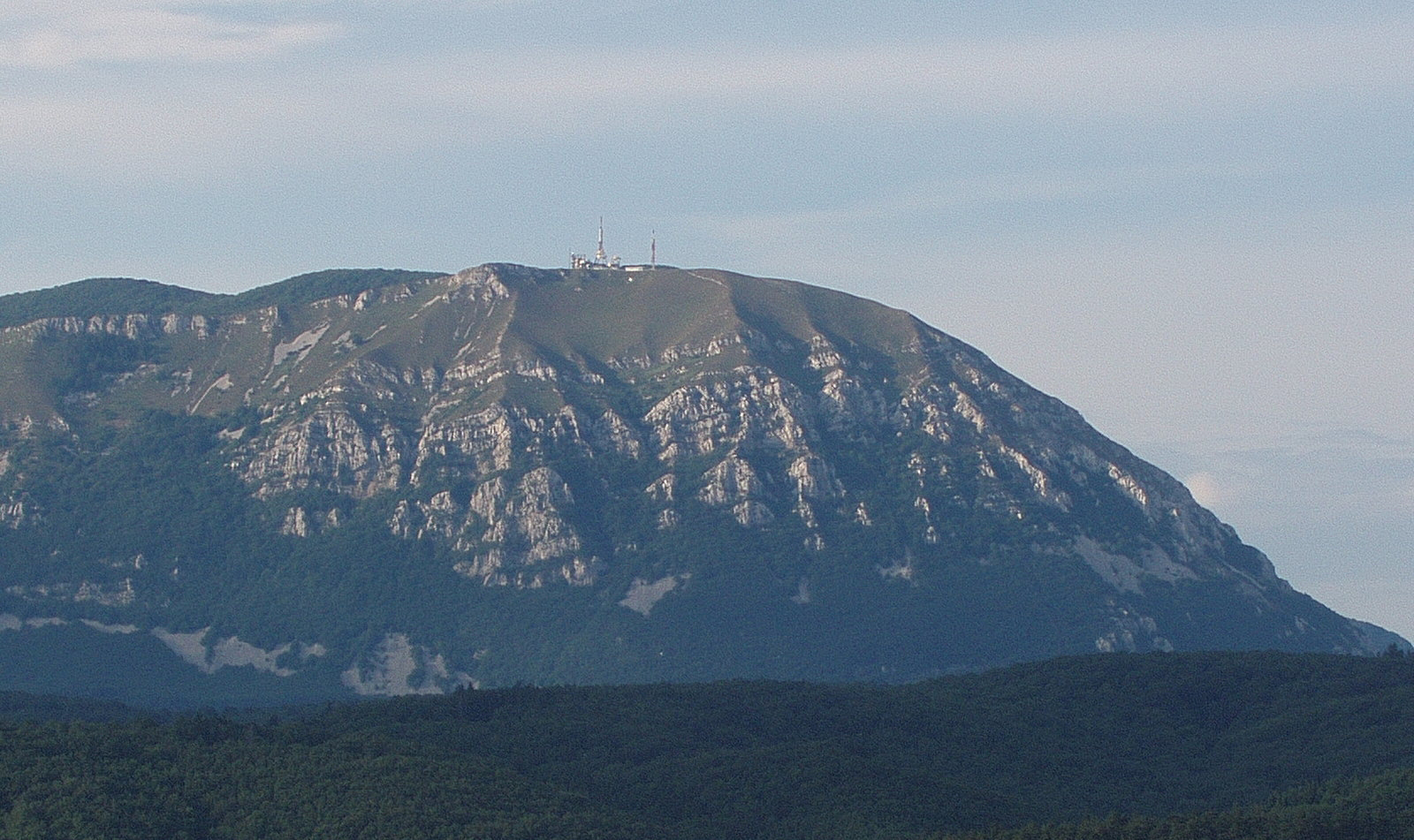
The Nanos Plateau above the Vipava Valley

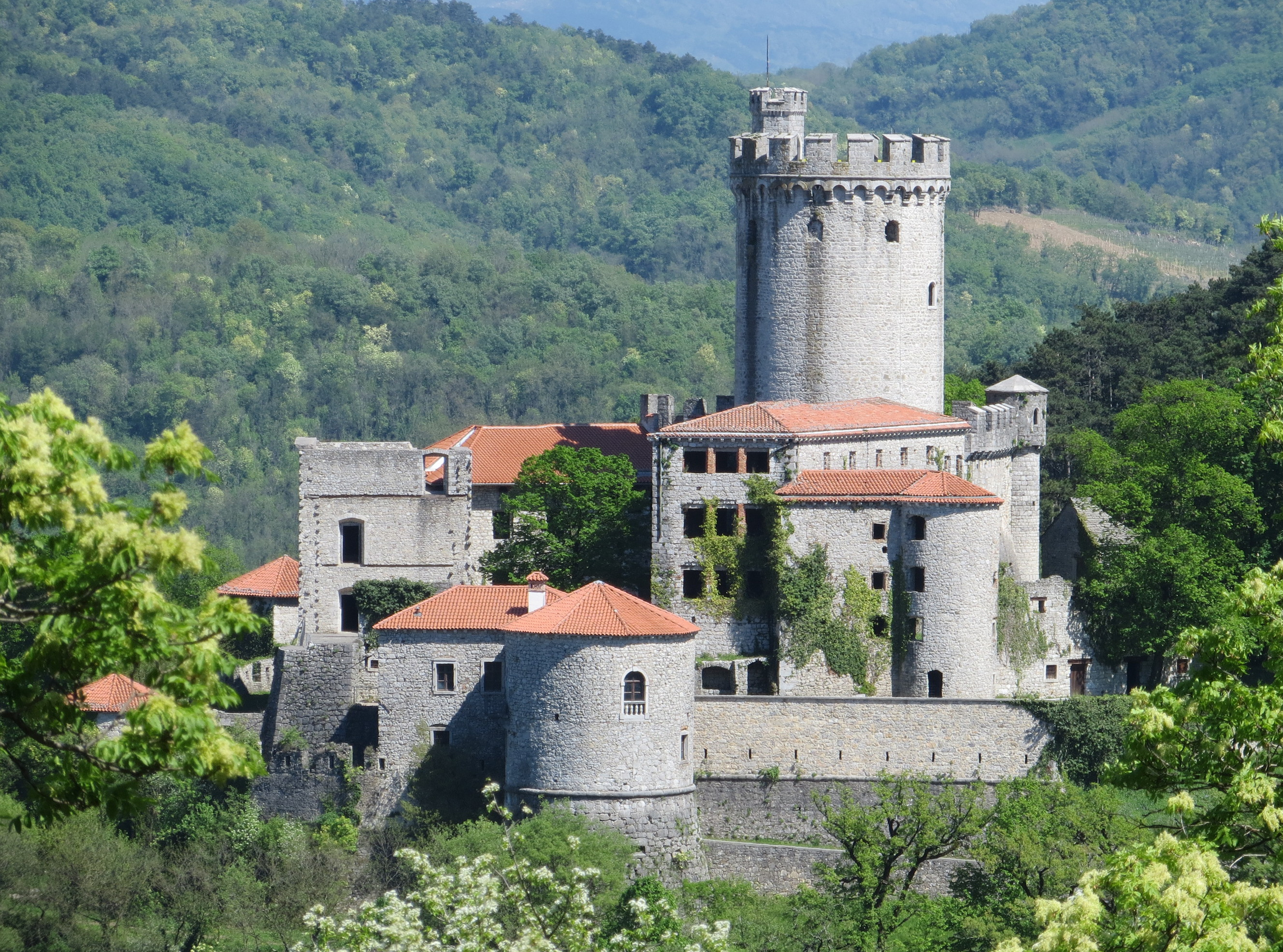
Rihemberk Castle near Branik

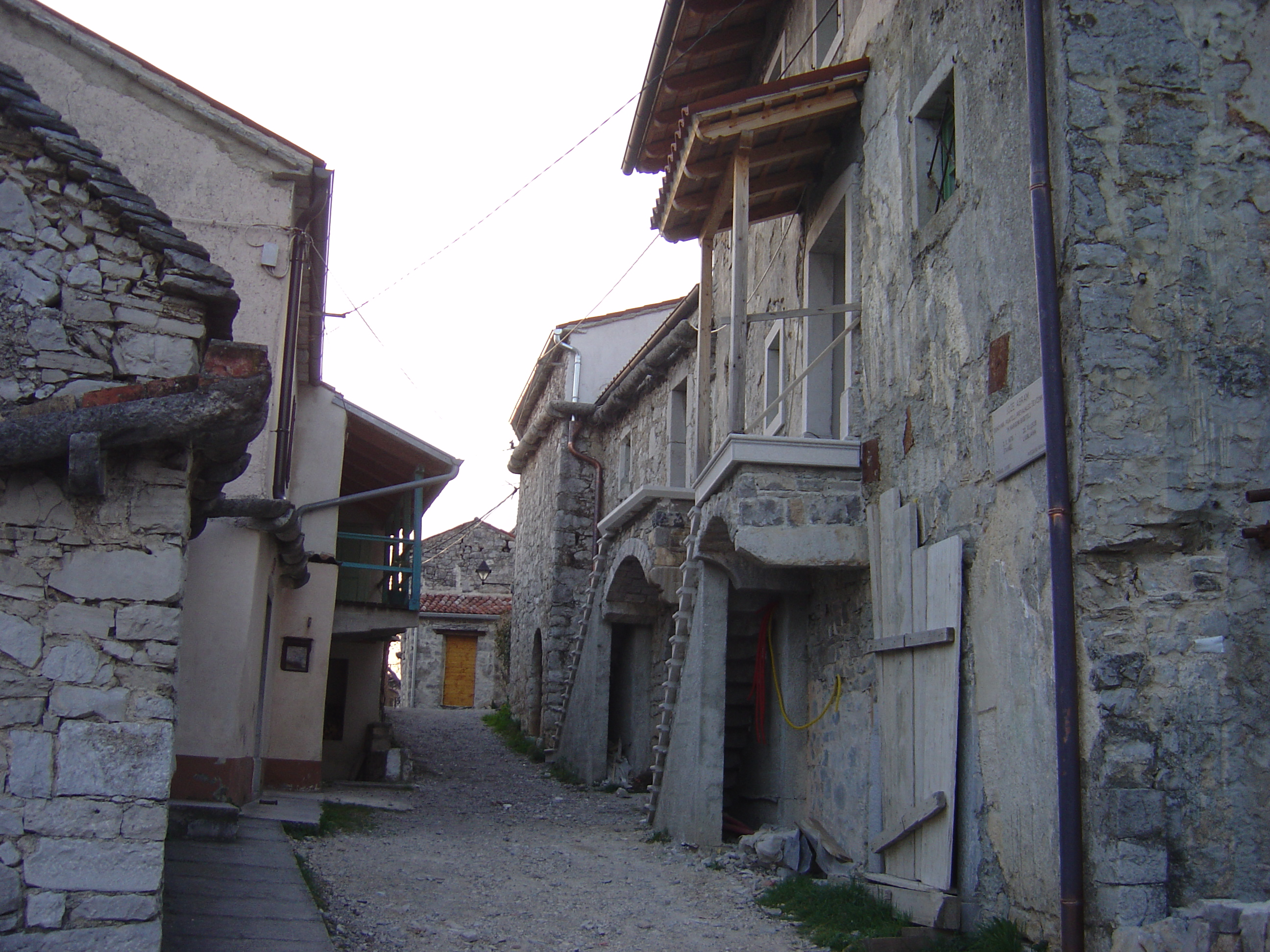
Rural architecture in Štanjel, in the Municipality of Komen

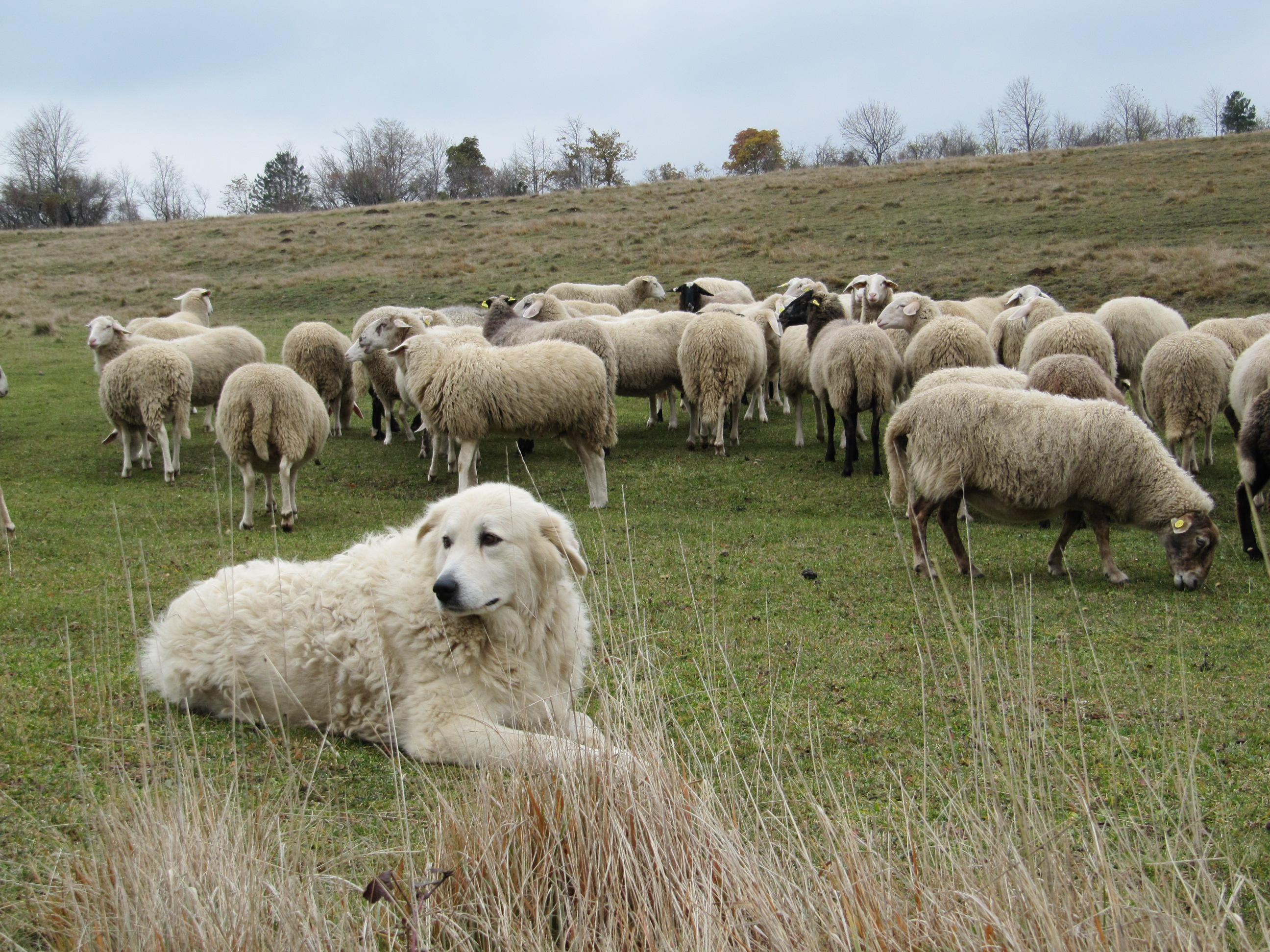
A herd of sheep on the Karst Plateau

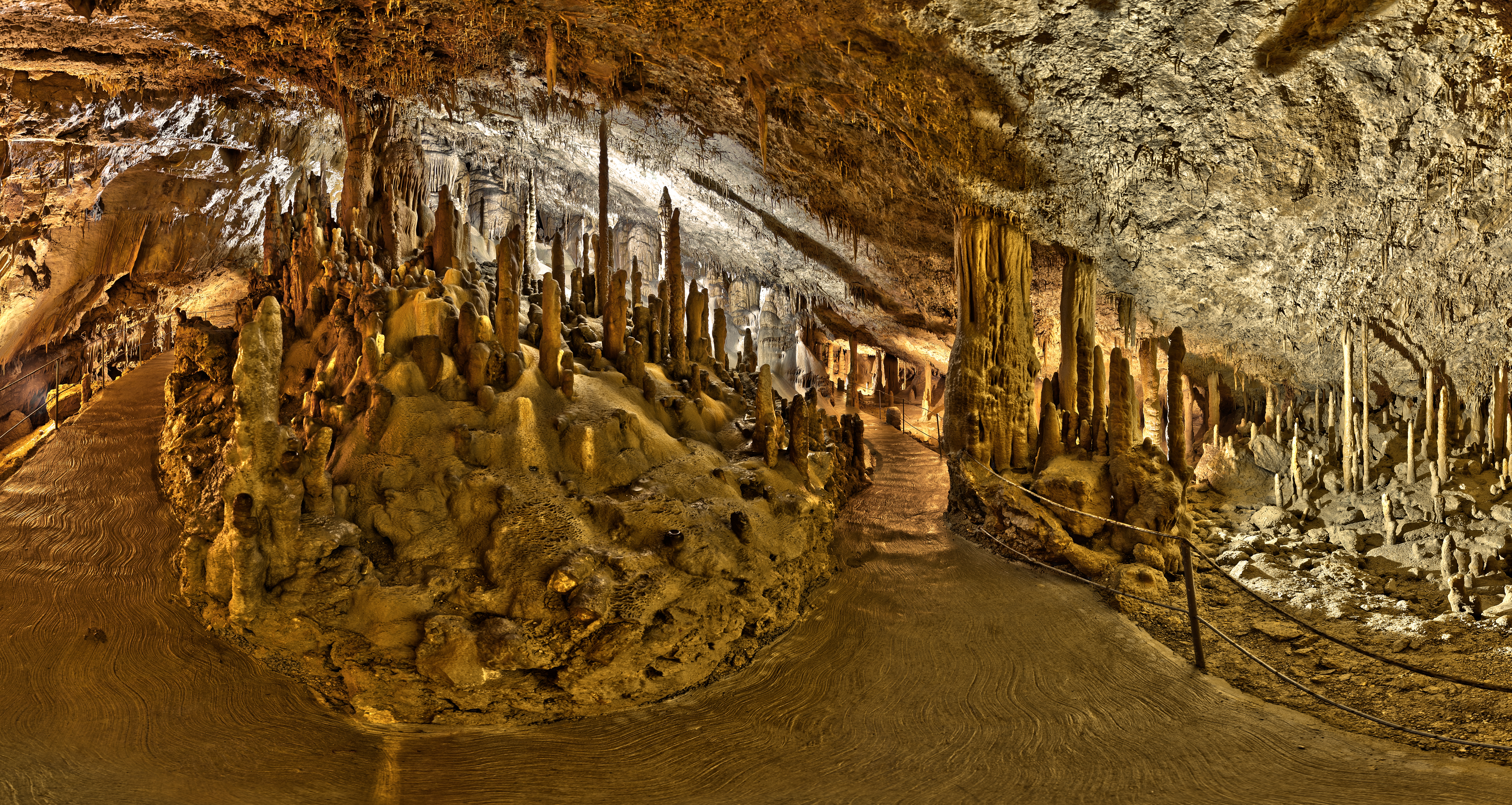
Škocjan Caves, a UNESCO site

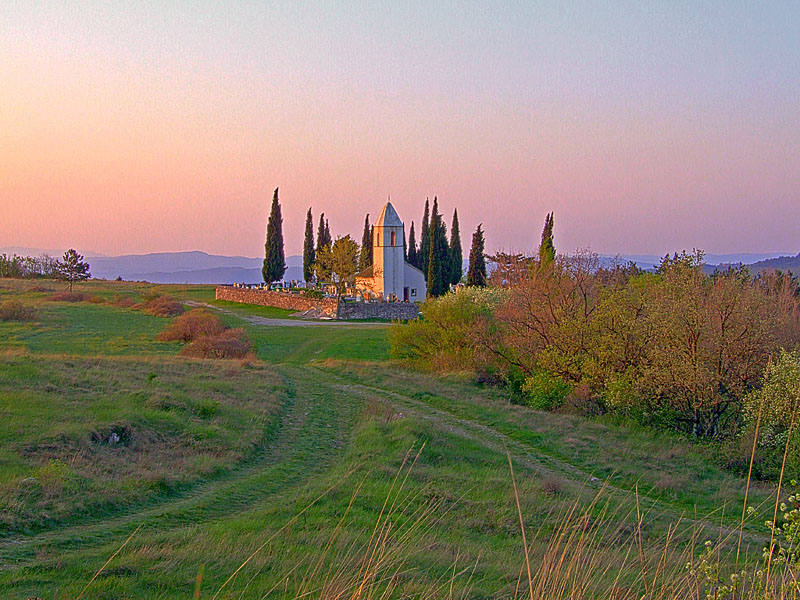
Landscape in Slovene Istria

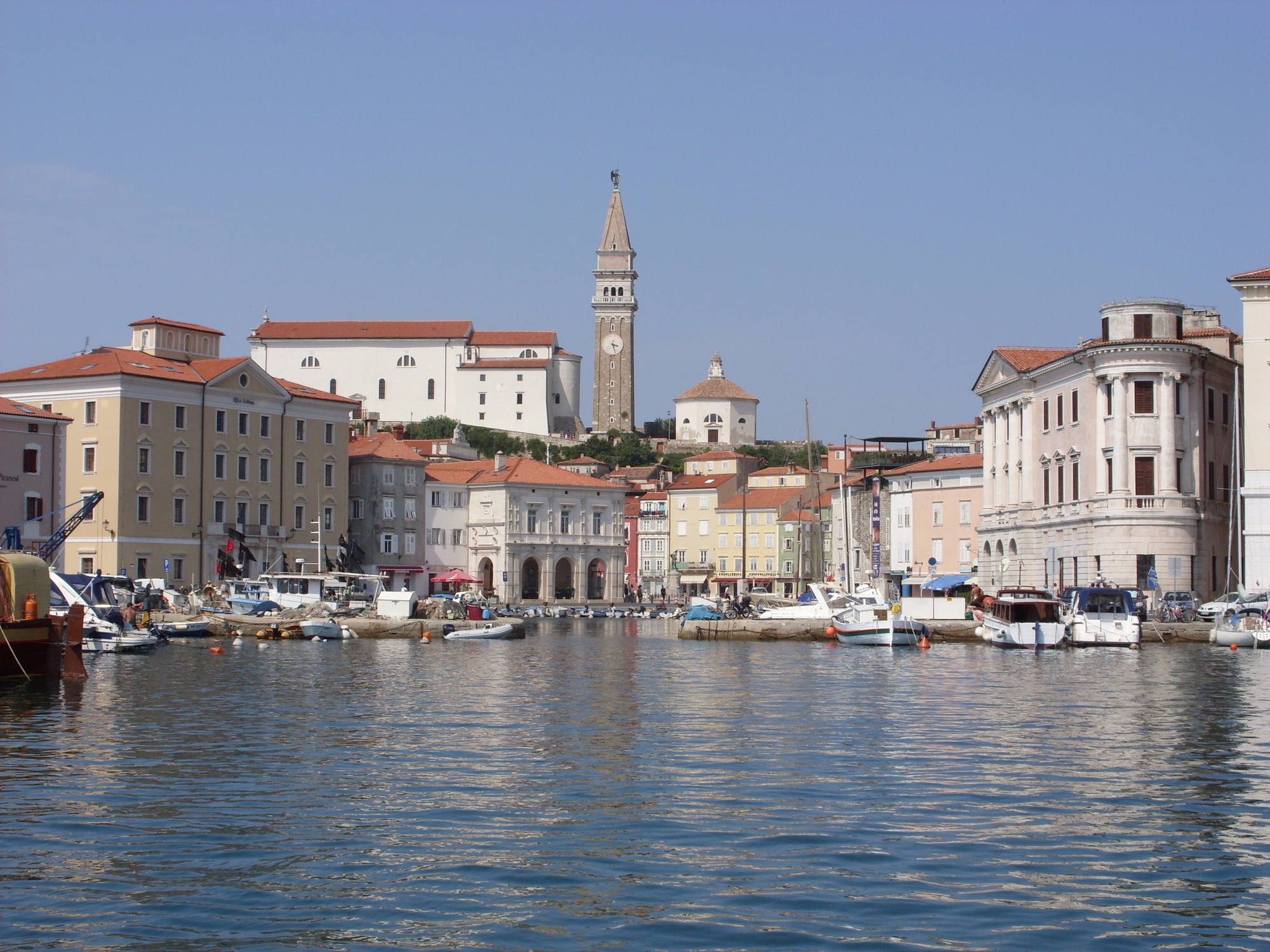
The Adriatic town of Piran

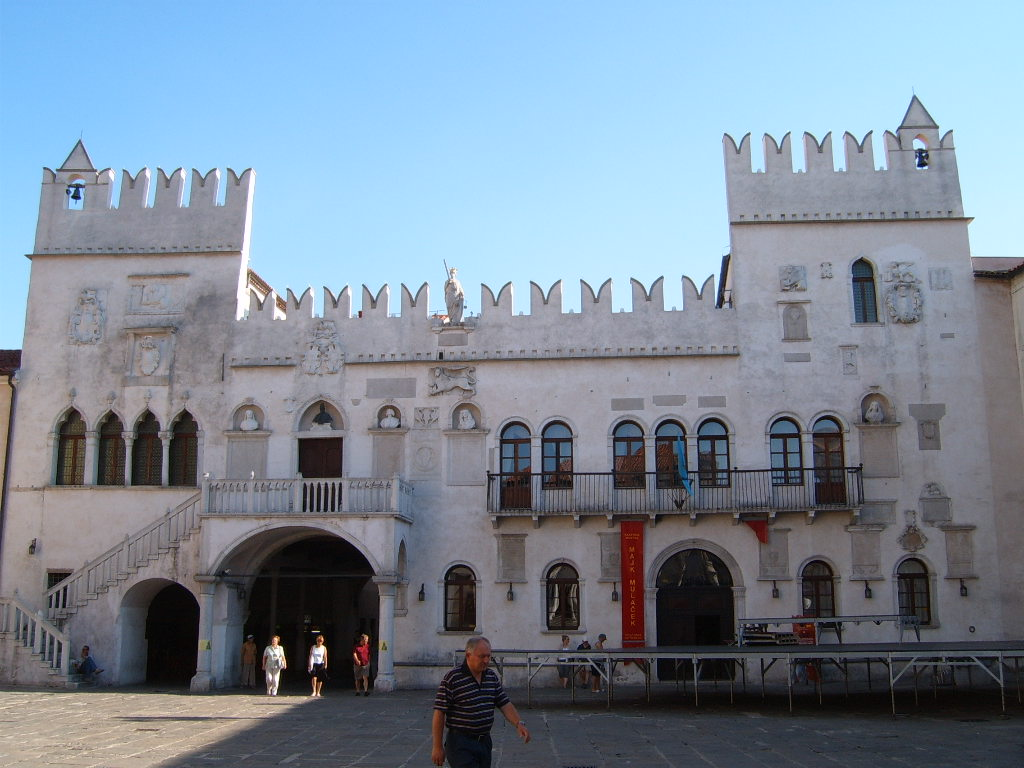
The Praetorian Palace in Koper

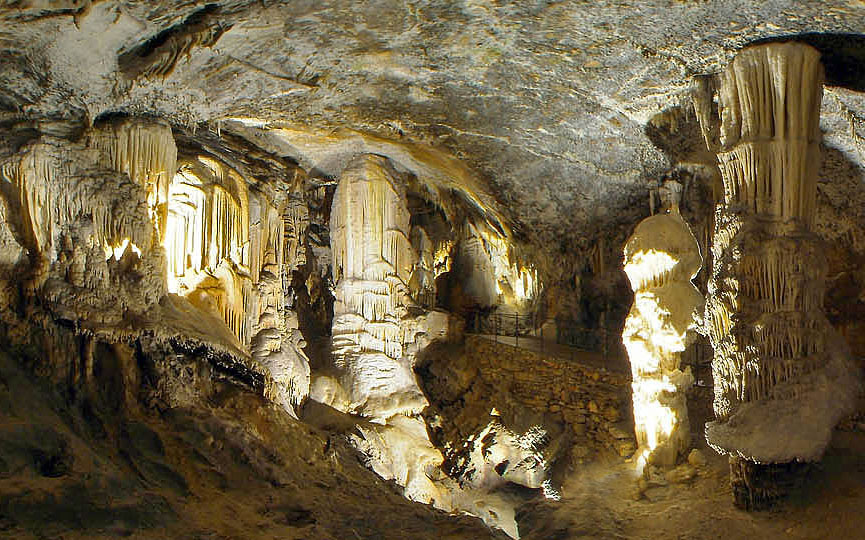
Postojna Cave

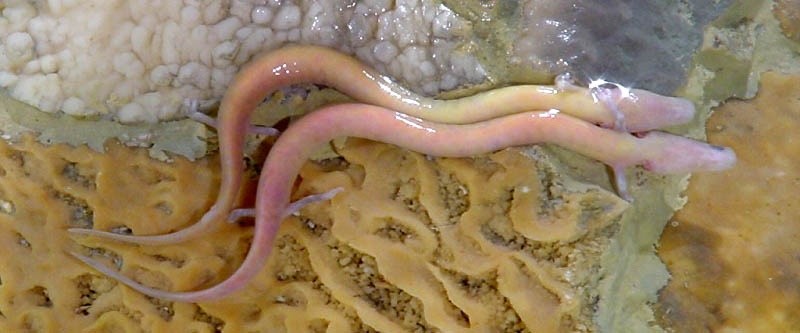
Olms in Postojna Cave

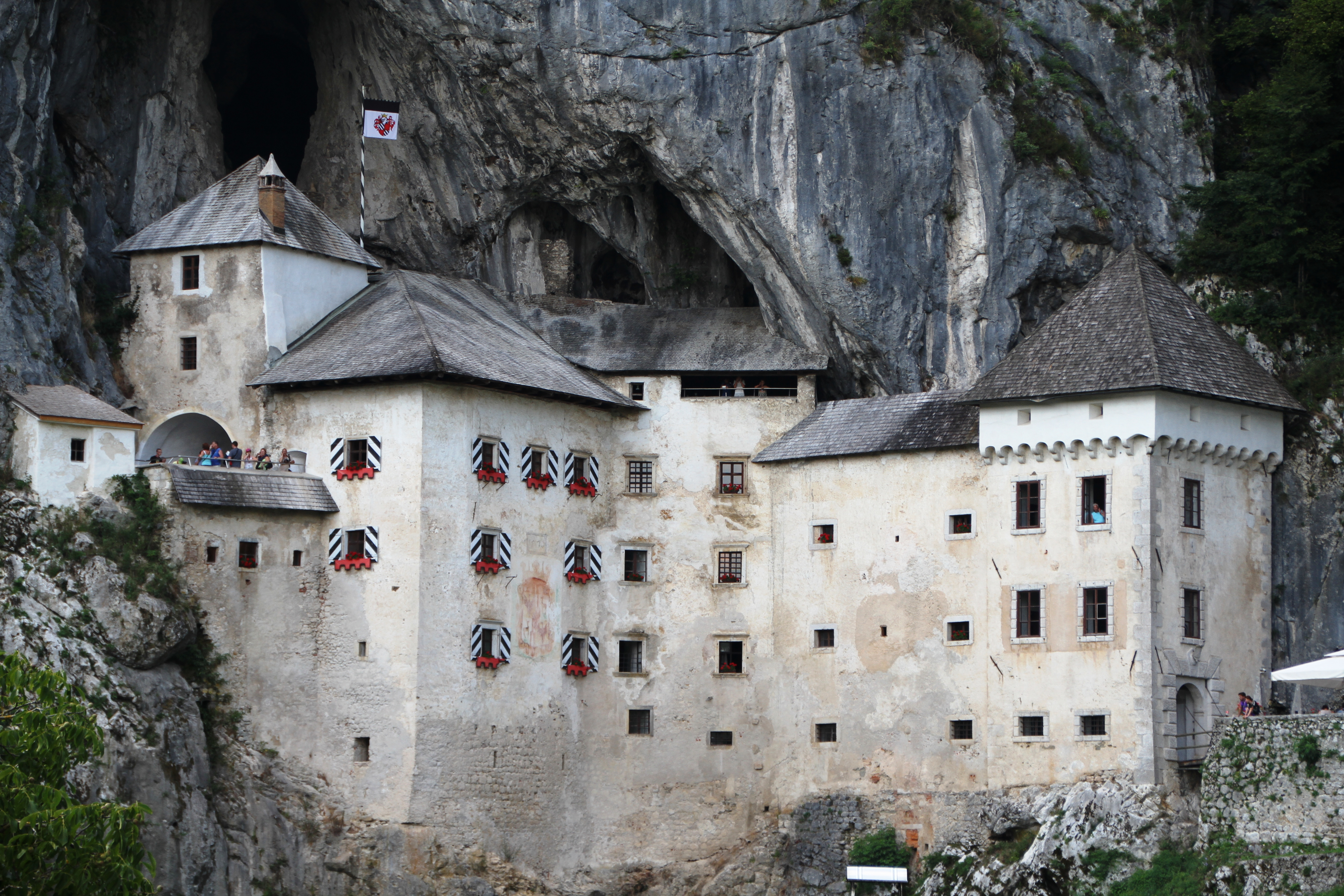
Predjama Castle in Inner Carniola

== See also ==
- Battles of the Isonzo
- Goriška
- Morgan Line
- Treaty of Osimo
- Karst Plateau
- Vipava Valley
- Soča
- Slovenian wine
- Venetian Slovenia
