= Slovene minority in Italy (1920–1947) =

The Slovene minority in Italy (1920–1947) was the indigenous Slovene population—approximately 327,000 out of a total population of 1.3 million ethnic Slovenes at the time—that was cut from the remaining three-quarters of the Slovene ethnic community after the First World War. According to the secret Treaty of London and the Treaty of Rapallo in 1920, the former Austrian Littoral and western part of the former Inner Carniola of defeated Austria-Hungary were annexed to the Kingdom of Italy. Whereas only a few thousand Italians were left in the new South Slavic (Note: In the beginning called the Kingdom of Serbs, Croats and Slovenes, renamed Yugoslavia in 1929.) state, a population of half a million Slavs, both Slovenes and Croats, was subjected to forced Italianization until the fall of Fascism in Italy. After the Second World War, most of the region known as the Slovenian Littoral was transferred to Yugoslavia under the terms of the Treaty of Peace with Italy, 1947.

== Italianization ==
At the end of the 19th century, Trieste was the largest Slovene city, with more Slovene inhabitants than even Ljubljana. The Austrian census of 1911 recorded 56,845 Slovene speakers, compared to 41,727 in Ljubljana (part of the general Austrian census of 1910). They were the largest ethnic group in 9 of the 19 urban neighbourhoods of Trieste, and represented a majority in 7 of them. The Italian speakers, on the other hand, made up 60.1% of the population in the city center, 38.1% in the suburbs, and 6.0% in the surroundings. They were the largest linguistic group in 10 of the 19 urban neighbourhoods, and represented the majority in 7 of them (including all 6 in the city centre). Of the 11 villages included within the city limits, the Slovene speakers had an overwhelming majority in 10, and the German speakers in one (Miramare).

After being ceded from multiethnic Austria, the Italian nationalist milieus sought to make Trieste a città italianissima, committing a series of attacks led by Black Shirts against Slovene shops, libraries, lawyers' offices, and the central place of the rival community in the Trieste National Hall. Forced Italianization followed, and by the mid-1930s several thousand Slovenes, especially intellectuals from the Trieste region, emigrated to the Kingdom of Yugoslavia and to South America.

Notable Slovenes affected by Italianization included the poet Srečko Kosovel and the writer Boris Pahor. Slovenes that emigrated included the writers Vladimir Bartol and Josip Ribičič, the legal theorist Boris Furlan, and the architect Viktor Sulčič. In order to fight the Fascist repression, the militant anti-fascist organization TIGR was formed in 1927.

== Today ==
The estimated number of today's Slovene minority in Italy is 83,000 to 100,000.

== Notable members of the Slovene minority in Italy (1920–1947) ==
- Boris Pahor (1913-2022)
- Vladimir Bartol (1903–1967)
- Milko Bambič (1905–1991)

== See also ==
- Slovene Lands
