= Vladimir Bartol =

Slovenian writer

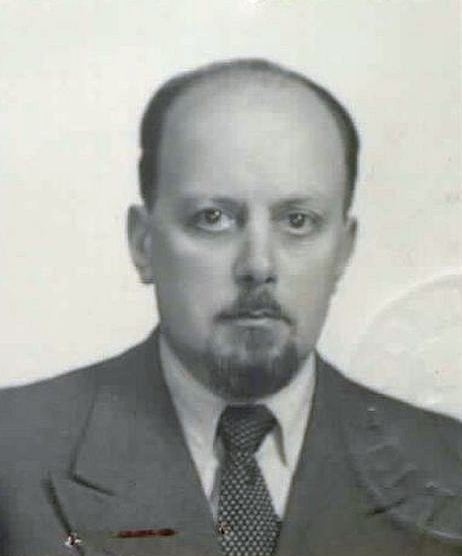
- Bartol in 1953
- Born: 24 February 1903; Trieste, Austria-Hungary
- Died: 12 September 1967 (aged 64); Ljubljana, SR Slovenia, SFR Yugoslavia
- Occupation: Writer

Vladimir Bartol (24 February 1903 – 12 September 1967) was a writer from the Slovene minority in Italy. He is best known for his 1938 novel Alamut, the most popular work of Slovene literature around the world, which has been translated into numerous languages.

== Life ==
Bartol was born on 24 February 1903 in San Giovanni (Slovene: Sveti Ivan), a suburb of the Austro-Hungarian city of Trieste (Slovene: Trst) (now in Italy), in a middle class Slovene minority family. His father Gregor Bartol was a post office clerk, and his mother Marica Bartol Nadlišek was a teacher, a renowned editor and feminist author. He was the third child of seven and his parents offered him extensive education. His mother introduced him to painting, while his father shared with him his interest in biology. Bartol began to be interested in philosophy, psychology, and biology, but also art, theatre, and literature, as described in his autobiographical short stories.

Bartol began his elementary and secondary schooling in Trieste and concluded it in Ljubljana, where he enrolled at the University of Ljubljana to study biology and philosophy. In Ljubljana, he met the young Slovene philosopher Klement Jug who introduced him to the works of Friedrich Nietzsche. Bartol also gave special attention to the works of Sigmund Freud.

He graduated in 1925 and continued his studies at Sorbonne in Paris (1926–1927), for which he obtained a scholarship. In 1928, he served the army in Petrovaradin (now in the autonomous province of Vojvodina in Serbia). From 1933 to 1934, he lived in Belgrade, where he edited the Slovenian Belgrade Weekly. Afterward, he returned to Ljubljana where he worked as a freelance writer until 1941. During World War II, he joined Slovene partisans and actively participated in the resistance movement.

After the war, he moved to his hometown Trieste, where he spent an entire decade, from 1946 to 1956. Later he was elected to the Slovenian Academy of Sciences And Arts as an associate member, moved to Ljubljana and continued to work for the Academy until his death on 12 September 1967. He is buried in the Žale cemetery in Ljubljana.

== Work ==
Some of his works, including the 1938 novel Alamut, have been interpreted as an allegory of the TIGR and the fight against the Italian repression of the Slovene minority in Italy. Alamut is set in Persia in the Middle Ages and features the Order of Assassins.

=== List of works ===
- Lopez (1932, play)
- Al Araf (1935, short story collection)
- Alamut (1938, novel), translated into Czech (1946), Serbian (1954), French (1988), Spanish, Italian (1989), German (1992), Turkish, Persian (1995), English (2004), Hungarian (2005), Arabic, Greek, Korean and other languages.
- Empedokles (1945)
- Tržaške humoreske ("Triestine Humoresques", 1957, short story collection)
- Čudež na vasi ("Village Miracle", 1984, novel)
- Don Lorenzo (1985, story)
- Med idilo in grozo ("Between Idyll and Terror", 1988, short story collection)
- Zakrinkani trubadur ("The Masked Troubadour", 1993, essay collection)
- Mladost pri Svetem Ivanu ("Youth at St. Ivan", 2001, autobiography)
- Pisma iz blaznice ("Letters from the Madhouse", 2024, collecting the novellas Pozni zdravnik in Prebujenje)

== See also ==
- Slovenian literature
- Slovene minority in Italy (1920-1947)
- List of Slovenian writers
- List of Slovenes
