= Italianization =

Spread of Italian culture and language, either by integration or assimilation

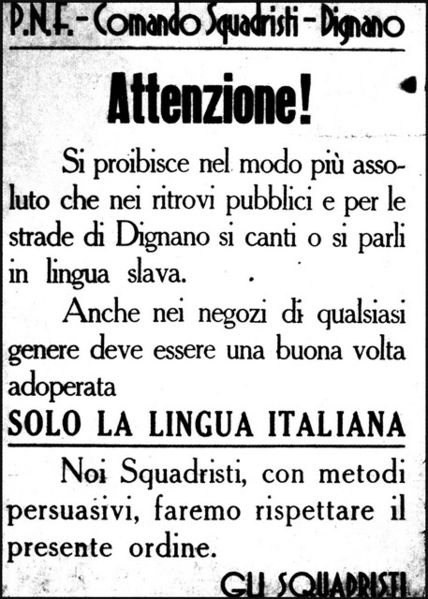
A leaflet from the period of Fascist Italianization prohibiting singing or speaking in the "Slavic language" in the streets, public places and shops of Dignano (now Vodnjan, Croatia). Signed by the Squadristi (blackshirts), and threatening the use of "persuasive methods" in enforcement.

Italianization (Italian: italianizzazione [italjaniddzatˈtsjoːne]; Croatian: talijanizacija; French: italianisation; Spanish: italianización; Portuguese: italianização; Slovene: poitaljančevanje; German: Italianisierung; Greek: Ιταλοποίηση, romanized: Italopoíisi) is the spread of Italian culture, language and identity by way of integration or assimilation. It is also known for a process organized by the Kingdom of Italy to force cultural and ethnic assimilation of the native populations living, primarily, in the former Austro-Hungarian territories that were transferred to Italy after World War I in exchange for Italy having joined the Triple Entente in 1915; this process was mainly conducted during the period of Fascist rule between 1922 and 1943.

== Regions and populations affected ==
Between 1922 and the beginning of World War II, the affected people were the German-speaking and Ladin-speaking populations of Trentino-Alto Adige, Friulians, and Slovenes and Croats in the Julian March. The program was later extended to areas annexed during World War II, affecting Slovenes in the Province of Ljubljana, and Croats in Gorski Kotar and coastal Dalmatia, Greeks in the Ionian islands and, to a lesser extent, to the French- and Arpitan-speaking regions of the western Alps (such as the Aosta valley). On the other hand, other indigenous communities, such as in Lombardy, Venetia and the island of Sardinia, had already undergone cultural and linguistic Italianization starting from an earlier period.

=== Istria, Julian March and Dalmatia ===
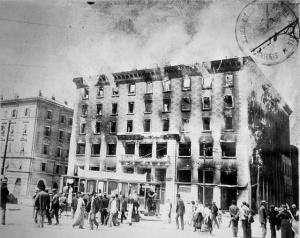
Fascists burn the Slovenian Narodni dom ("National Home") in Trieste, 13 July 1920

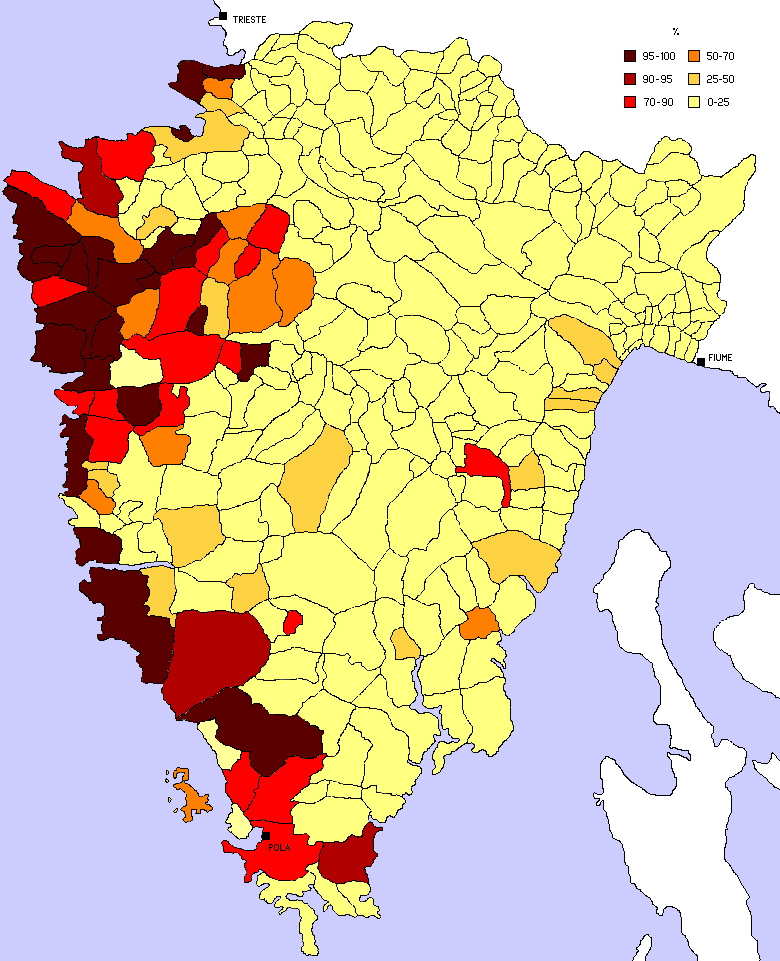
Proportion of Istrian Italians in Istria in 1910, per the Austro-Hungarian census

The former Austrian Littoral (later renamed the Julian March) was occupied by the Italian Army after the Armistice with Austria. Following the annexation of the March by Italy, 400 cultural, sporting (for example Sokol), youth, social and professional Slavic organizations, and libraries ("reading rooms"), three political parties, 31 newspapers and journals, and 300 co-operatives and financial institutions had been forbidden, and specifically so later with the Law on Associations (1925), the Law on Public Demonstrations (1926) and the Law on Public Order (1926), the closure of the classical lyceum in Pazin, of the high school in Volosko (1918), the closure of the 488 Slovene and Croat primary schools followed.

The period of violent persecution of Slovenes in Trieste began with riots on 13 April 1920, which were organised as a retaliation for the assault on the Italian occupying troops by the local Croatian population in the 11 July Split incident. Many Slovene-owned shops and buildings were destroyed during the riots, which culminated in the burning down of the Narodni dom ("National Home"), the community hall of the Triestine Slovenes, by a group of Italian Fascists, led by Francesco Giunta. Benito Mussolini praised this action as a "masterpiece of the Triestine fascism". Two years later he became prime minister of Italy.

In September 1920, Mussolini said:

When dealing with such a race as Slavic – inferior and barbaric – we must not pursue the carrot, but the stick policy. We should not be afraid of new victims. The Italian border should run across the Brenner Pass, Monte Nevoso and the Dinaric Alps. I would say we can easily sacrifice 500,000 barbaric Slavs for 50,000 Italians.

— Benito Mussolini, speech held in Pola, 20 September 1920

This expressed a common Fascist opinion against the Croatian and Slovene minority in the Julian March.

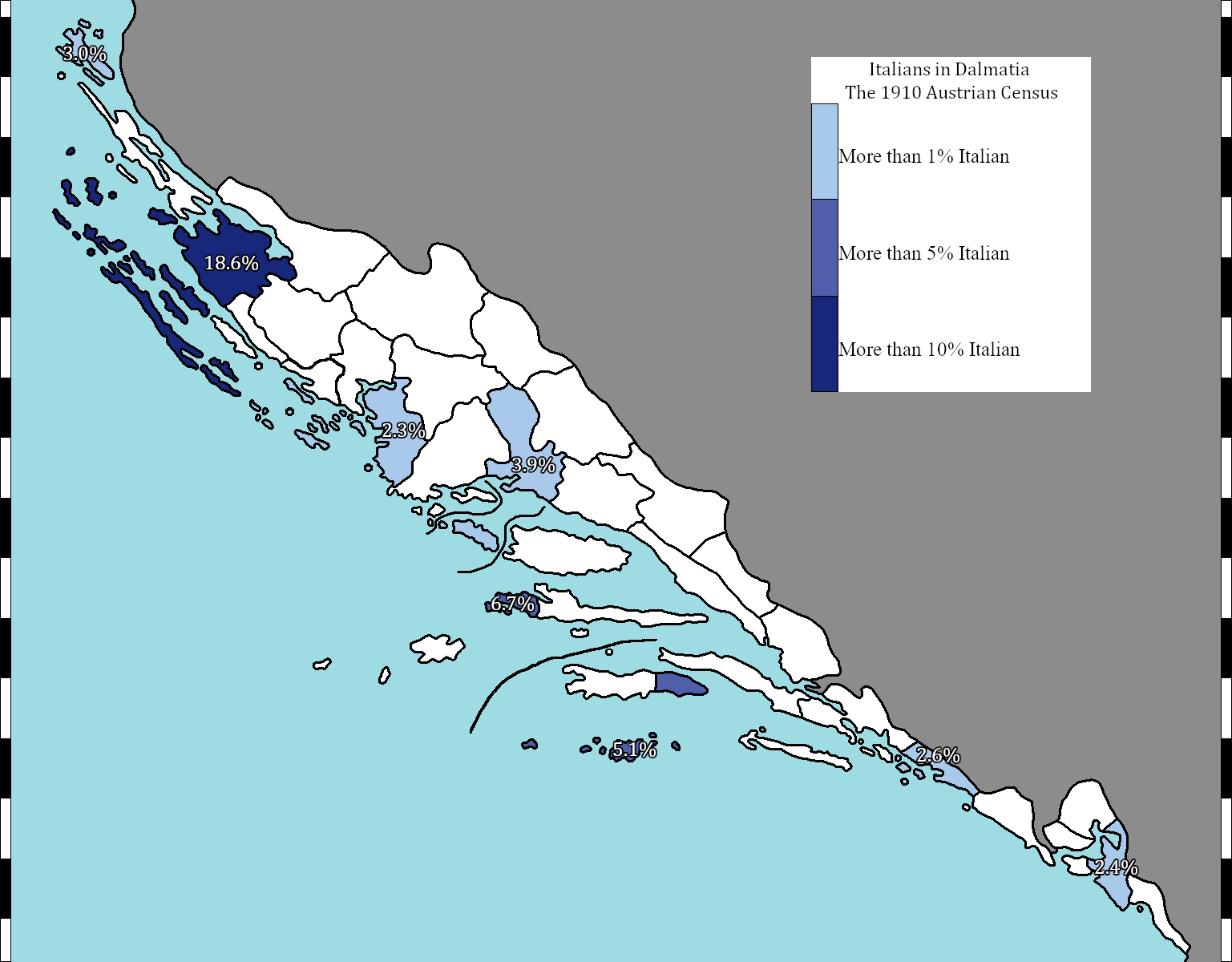
Proportion of Dalmatian Italians in Dalmatia in 1910, per the Austro-Hungarian census

Italian teachers were assigned to schools and the use of Croatian and Slovene languages in the administration and in the courts restricted. After March 1923 these languages were prohibited in administration, and after October 1925 in law courts, as well. In 1923, in the context of the organic school reform prepared by the fascist minister Giovanni Gentile, teaching in languages different from Italian was abolished. In the Julian March this meant the end of teaching in Croatian and Slovenian. Some 500 Slovene teachers, nearly half of all Slovene teachers in the Littoral region, were moved by the Italians from the area, to the interior of Italy, while Italian teachers were sent to teach Slovene children Italian. However, in Šušnjevica (it: Valdarsa) the use of Istro-Rumanian language was allowed after 1923.

In 1926, claiming that it was restoring surnames to their original Italian form, the Italian government announced the Italianization of German, Slovene and Croat surnames. In the Province of Trieste alone, 3,000 surnames were modified and 60,000 people had their surnames amended to an Italian-sounding form. First or given names were also Italianized.

Slovene and Croat societies and sporting and cultural associations had to cease every activity in line with a decision of provincial Fascist secretaries dated 12 June 1927. On a specific order from the prefect of Trieste on 19 November 1928, the Edinost political society was also dissolved. Croat and Slovene financial co-operatives in Istria, which at first were absorbed by the Pula or Trieste savings banks, were gradually liquidated.

In 1927, Giuseppe Cobolli Gigli, the minister for public works in fascist Italy, wrote in Gerarchia magazine, a Fascist publication, that "The Istrian muse named as Foibe those places suitable for burial of enemies of the national [Italian] characteristics of Istria".

The Slovene militant anti-Fascist organization TIGR emerged in 1927. It co-ordinated the Slovene resistance against Fascist Italy until its dismantlement by the Fascist secret police in 1941. At the time, some TIGR ex-members joined the Slovene Partisans. As a result of the repression, more than 100,000 Slovenes and Croats emigrated from Italian territory between the two world wars, the vast majority to Yugoslavia. Among the notable Slovene émigrés from Trieste were the writers Vladimir Bartol and Josip Ribičič, the legal theorist Boris Furlan, and the architect Viktor Sulčič.

During the Italian annexation of Dalmatia in World War II, Giuseppe Bastianini immediately gave way to a massive and violent Italianization of the annexed provinces: the political secretaries of the fascist party, of the after-work club, of the agricultural consortia and doctors, teachers, municipal employees, midwives were sent to administer them, immediately hated by those whose jobs they took away. Italian was imposed as a compulsory language for officials and teachers, although Serbo-Croatian was tolerated for communications within the civil administration. In the major centres, various signs written in Croatian were replaced by writings in Italian, Croatian flags, newspapers and posters were prohibited except the bilingual ones published by the Italian civil and military authorities; cultural and sporting societies dissolved, the Roman salute imposed, some Italian surnames restored. It was also proceeded, as already in Julian March and South Tyrol, with the Italianization of geographical names, streets and squares. A special office for the Adriatic lands offered loans and benefits to those willing to denationalize, and in the meantime purchased land to redistribute to former Italian combatants. Scholarships were established for Dalmatians who wanted to continue their studies in Italy and 52 Dalmatian Italians and 211 Croatians and Serbs made use of them.

=== South Tyrol ===
Ethnic distribution South Tyrol Census 1880. In green German majority, in blue Ladin majority and in red Italian majority.

In 1919, at the time of its annexation, South Tyrol was inhabited by almost 90% German speakers. In October 1923, the use of the Italian language became mandatory (although not exclusive) on all levels of federal, provincial and local government.

Regulations by the fascist authorities required that all kinds of signs and public notices be in Italian only. Maps, postcards and other graphic material had to show Italian place names. In September 1925, Italian became the sole permissible language in courts of law. Illegal Katakombenschulen ("Catacomb schools") were set up by the local German-speaking majority to teach children the German language. The government created incentives to encourage immigration of native Italians to South Tyrol. Several factors limited the effects of the Italian policy, namely the adverse nature of the territory (mainly mountains and valleys of difficult access), the difficulty for the Italian-speaking individuals to adapt to a completely different environment and, later on, the alliance between Germany and Italy: under the 1939 South Tyrol Option Agreement, Adolf Hitler and Benito Mussolini determined the status of the German people living in the province. They either had to opt for emigration to Germany or stay in Italy and become fully Italianized. Because of the outbreak of World War II, this agreement was never fully implemented and most ethnic Germans remained or returned at the end of the war.

Following World War II, South Tyrol was one of the first regions to be granted autonomy on the ground of its peculiar linguistic situation; any further attempts at Italianization were formally abandoned.

In the 21st century, just over 100 years after the Italian annexation of the region, 64% of the population of South Tyrol speak German as their first and everyday language.

=== Aosta Valley ===
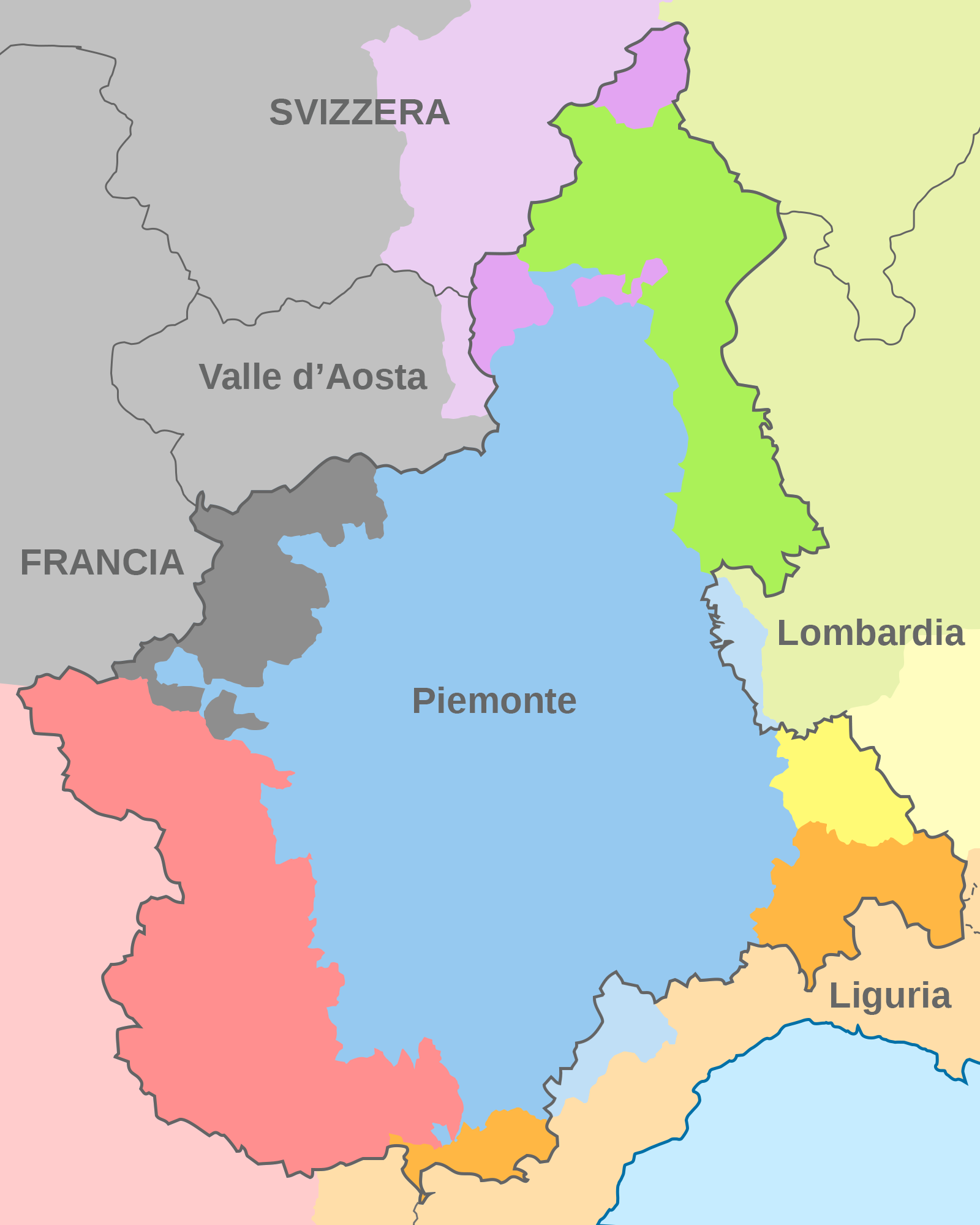
Linguistic map of north-western Italy, of which the Aosta Valley is a part

Fascism tried to Italianize Aosta Valley, suppressing the French-speaking schools (French: Écoles de hameau), establishing the exclusive use of the Italian language in judicial offices (Royal Decree of 15 October 1925, n. 1796), suppressing the teaching of the French language (Royal Decree 22 November 1925, n. 2191), Italianizing toponyms (ordinance of 22 July 1939) and suppressing newspapers in French, such as Le Duché d'Aoste, Le Pays d'Aoste and La Patrie valdôtaine. Furthermore, with Royal Decree n. 1 of 2 January 1927, Aosta Valley became the province of Aosta including also part of the Italian-speaking Canavese.

A secret society was organized in the region for the defense of the Aosta Valley identity and the use of the French language, the Ligue valdôtaine, whose founder was Anselme Réan, as well as a partisan activity which led to the Declaration of Chivasso, signed by the representatives of the communities Alpine in defense of their particularism. A member of the resistance, Émile Chanoux, arrested by the fascist militia, was assassinated in prison on the night of 18–19 May 1944.

=== Sardinia ===
In 1720, the island of Sardinia was ceded to Alpine House of Savoy, which at the time already controlled a number of other states in the Italian mainland, most notably Piedmont. The Savoyards had imposed the Italian language on Sardinia as part of a wider cultural policy designed to bind the island to the Mainland in such a way as to prevent either future attempts of political separation or curb a renewed interest on the part of Spain. In fact, the complex linguistic composition of the native islanders, theretofore extraneous to Italian and its cultural sphere, had been previously roofed by Spanish as the prestige language of the upper class for centuries; in this context, Italianization, while difficult at first, was intended as a cultural policy whereby the social and economic structures of the island could become increasingly intertwined with the Mainland and expressly Piedmont, where the Kingdom's central power lay. The 1847 Perfect Fusion, performed with an assimilationist intent and politically analogous to the Acts of Union between Britain and Ireland, determined the conventional moment wherefrom, according to Antonietta Dettori, the Sardinian language ceased to be regarded as an identity marker of a specific ethnic group, and was instead lumped in with a dialectal conglomerate which, in the Mainland, had long been subordinate to the national language. The jurist Carlo Baudi di Vesme, in his 1848 essay Considerazioni politiche ed economiche sulla Sardegna, stated that Sardinian was one of the most significant barriers separating the islanders from the Italian Mainland, and only the suppression of their dialects could ensure that they might understand the governmental instructions, issued in Italian, and become properly "civilized" subjects of the Savoyard Kingdom.

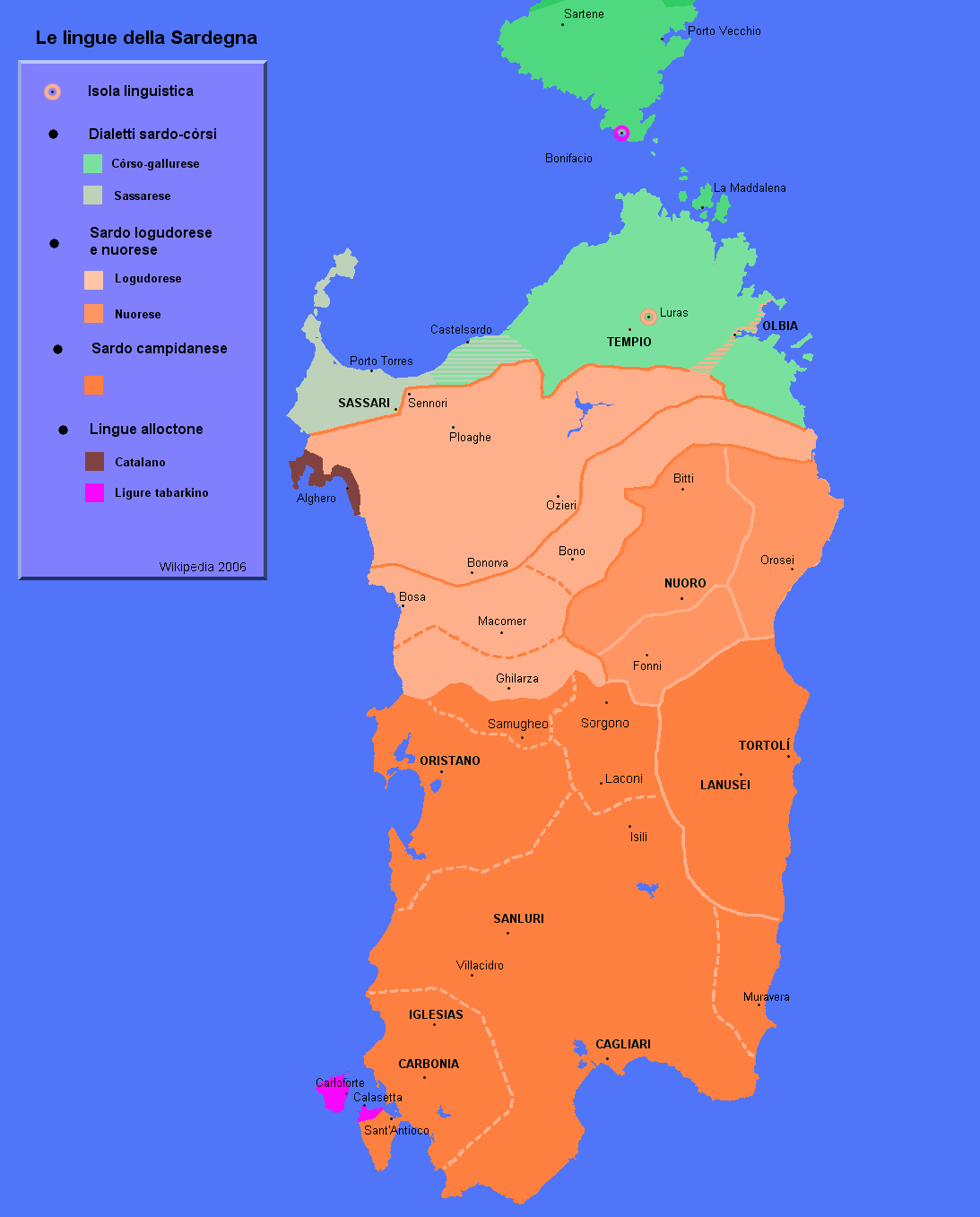
Sardinian languages

However, it was not until the rise of fascism that Sardinian was actively banned and/or excluded from any residual cultural activities to enforce a thorough shift to Italian. According to Guido Melis, the resulting assimilation created "an intergenerational rift that could no longer be healed".

After the end of the Second World War, efforts continued to be made to further Italianize the population, with the justification that by doing so, as the principles of the modernization theory ran, the island could rid itself of the "ancient traditional practices" which held it back, regarded as a legacy of barbarism to be disposed of at once in order to join the Mainland's economic growth; Italianization had thus become a mass phenomenon, taking roots in the hitherto predominantly Sardinian-speaking villages. To many Sardinians, abandoning their language and acquiring Italian as a cultural norm represented a means through which they could distance themselves from their original group, which they perceived as marginalized and lacking in prestige, and thereby incorporate themselves into an altogether different social group. The Sardinians have been thus led to part with their language as it bore the mark of a stigmatized identity, the embodiment of a long-suffered social and political subordination in a chained society, as opposed to the social advancement granted them by embracing Italian; such social stigma went beyond the Sardinian language itself to also encompass the Sardinian-influenced accent when speaking Italian, which, unlike other accents, was equally considered uncouth and befitting criminals, or ignorance. Research on ethnolinguistic prejudice has pointed to feelings of inferiority amongst the Sardinians in relation with mainlanders and the Italian language, perceived as a symbol of continental superiority and cultural dominance. Many indigenous cultural practices were to go extinct, shifting towards other forms of socialization.

Within a few generations Sardinian, as well as Alghero's Catalan dialect, would become a minority language spoken by fewer and fewer Sardinian families, the majority of whom have turned into monolingual and monocultural Italians. This process has been slower to take hold in the countryside than in the main cities, where it has become most evident instead.

Nowadays, the Sardinians are linguistically and culturally assimilated into Italian and, despite the official recognition conferred to Sardinian by the national law in 1999, according to Giulio Paulis "identify with their language to lesser degree than other linguistic minorities in Italy, and instead seem to identify with Italian to a higher degree than other linguistic minorities in Italy". It is estimated that around 10 to 13 percent of the young people born in Sardinia are still competent in Sardinian, and the language is currently used exclusively by 0.6% of the total population. A 2012 study conducted by the University of Cagliari and Edinburgh found that the interviewees from Sardinia with the strongest sense of Italian identity were also those expressing the most unfavourable opinion towards Sardinian.

=== Dodecanese islands ===
The twelve major islands of the Dodecanese, of which the largest is Rhodos, were ruled by Italy between 1912 and 1945. After a period of military rule, civil governors were appointed in 1923 shortly after Fascists began to rule Italy and Italians were settled on the islands. The first governor, Mario Lago, encouraged intermarriage between Italian settlers and Greeks, provided scholarships for young Greeks to study in Italy and set up a Dodecanese church to limit the influence of the Greek Orthodox Church. Fascist youth organizations were introduced on the islands, and the Italianization of names was encouraged by the Italian authorities. The islanders did not, however, receive full citizenship and were not required to serve in the Italian armed forces. The population was allowed to elect their own mayors. Lagos' successor, Cesare Maria De Vecchi, embarked on a forced Italianization campaign in 1936. The Italian language became compulsory in education and public life, with Greek being only an optional subject in schools. In 1937 the elected mayors were replaced by appointed loyal fascists. In 1938, the new Italian Racial Laws were introduced to the islands.

=== Ionian Islands ===
The cultural remnants of the Venetian period were Mussolini's pretext to incorporate the Ionian Islands into the Kingdom of Italy. Even before the outbreak of World War II and the Greek-Italian 1940-1941 Winter War, Mussolini had expressed his wish to annex the Ionian Islands as an Italian province. After the fall of Greece in early April 1941, the Italians occupied much of the country, including the Ionians. Mussolini informed General Carlo Geloso that the Ionian Islands would form a separate Italian province through a de facto annexation, but the Germans would not approve it. Nevertheless, the Italian authorities continued to prepare the ground for the annexation. Finally, on 22 April 1941, after discussions between the German and Italian rulers, Hitler agreed that Italy could proceed with a de facto annexation of the islands. Thus on 10 August 1941 the islands of Corfu, Cephalonia, Zakynthos, Lefkada and some minor islands were officially annexed by Italy as part of the Grande Communità del Nuovo Impero Romano (Great Community of the New Roman Empire).

As soon as the fascist governor Piero Parini had installed himself on Corfu he vigorously began a forced Italianization policy that lasted until the end of the war. The islands passed through a phase of Italianization in all areas, from their administration to their economy. Italian was designated the islands' only official language; a new currency, the Ionian drachma, was introduced with the aim to hamper trade with the rest of Greece, which was forbidden by Parini. Transportation with continental Greece was limited; in the courts, judges had to apply Italian law, and schooling followed the educational model of the Italian mainland. Greek administrative officials were replaced by Italian ones, administrative officials of non-Ionic origin were expelled, the local gendarmes were partially replaced by Italian Carabinieri, although Parini initially allowed the Greek judges to continue their work, they were ultimately replaced by an Italian Military Court based in Corfu. The "return to the Venetian order" and the Italianization as pursued by Parini were even more drastic than the Italianization policies elsewhere, as their aim was a forced and abrupt cessation of all cultural and historical ties with the old mother country. The only newspaper on the islands was the Italian language "Giornale del Popolo". By early 1942 pre-war politicians in the Ionian Islands began to protest Parini's harsh policies. Parini reacted by opening a concentration camp on the island of Paxi, to which two more camps were added on Othonoi and Lazaretto islands. Parini's police troops arrested about 3,500 people, which were imprisoned at these three camps. The Italianization efforts in the Ionian islands ended in September 1943, after the armistice of Cassibile.
