= Trieste National Hall =

Coordinates: 45°39′17″N 13°46′29″E

Building entrance in 2021

The Trieste National Hall or Slovene Cultural Centre (Slovene: Narodni dom) in Trieste is a multimodal building that served for 15 years as a social and economic centre for the Slovene minority in the city. It included the Slovene theatre in Trieste, a hotel, a restaurant, a gym and numerous cultural associations. It is notable for having been burned in 1920 by Italian Fascists following the murder of several Italian Navy soldiers in Dalmatia by Yugoslavs, which made it a symbol of the Slovene minority in Italy. The building was restored from 1988 to 1990. and later used as a hotel (Hotel Regina). Around 2010 it has been renovated according to the original plans.

== Building ==
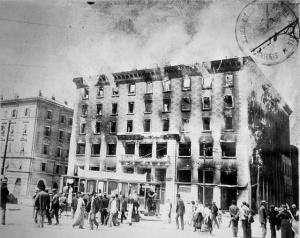
Burning of Hotel Balkan

Such institutions were typical in Slovenian ethnic territory in the decades around 1900. It was built by the Slovenian architect Max Fabiani between 1901 and 1904. Fabiani designed the building with the concept of technical-rational structure, with the facade of monumental stone. It was completed in 1904. It had an ornate facade and state-of-the-art equipment, including an electric generator and central heating.

== Fascist attack ==
On 13 July 1920, at the end of a violent anti-Slovenian demonstration as a reaction to the July 11 Split incident in which several Italian soldiers were killed in Dalmatia by Yugoslavs, the building was burned by the Fascist Blackshirts, led by Francesco Giunta. The act was praised by Benito Mussolini, who had not yet assumed power, as a "masterpiece of the Triestine Fascism" (Italian: capolavoro del fascismo triestino). It was part of a wider pogrom against the Slovenes and other Slavs in the very centre of Trieste and the harbinger of the ensuing violence against the Slovenes and Croats in the Julian March.

On 15 May 1921, less than a year after the arson attack, the architect Fabiani became a member of the Italian Fascist movement. The reason for his joining the party and his political activity in the following years remains unclear.

== Legacy ==
Boris Pahor's autobiographical novel Trg Oberdan (Note: Boris Pahor's novel has been translated into German under the title Piazza Oberdan.) describes how he witnessed the Fascists burning the building.
