= List of Slovenes =

This is a list of Slovenes and people from Slovenia that are notable.

== Artists including performing arts ==
- Zvest Apollonio (1935–2009) – painter and printmaker
- Stanislava Brezovar (1937–2003) – ballerina
- Franz Caucig (1755–1828) – Neoclassical painter
- Anton Cebej (1722–1774) – Baroque painter
- Avgust Černigoj (1898–1985) – painter
- Jože Ciuha (1924–2015) – painter, printmaker, and illustrator
- Ivan Grohar (1867–1911) – painter
- Anton Gvajc (1865–1935) – painter
- Herman Gvardjančič (born 1943) – painter
- Stane Jagodič (born 1943) – painter, printmaker, montager and illustrator
- Božidar Jakac (1899–1989) – painter, printmaker, and illustrator
- Rihard Jakopič (1869–1943) – painter
- Matija Jama (1872–1947) – impressionist painter
- Laurenz Janscha (1749–1812) – landscape painter and engraver
- Anton Karinger (1829–1870) – painter and poet
- Ivana Kobilca (1861–1926) – realist painter
- Lojze Logar (1944–2014) – painter and printmaker
- Fredy Malec Koschitz(1914–2001) - painter and woodcarver
- Adriana Maraž (1931–2015) – painter and printmaker
- Julie Martini (1871–1943) – photographer
- Špelca Mladič (1894–1981) – painter and designer
- Pino Mlakar (1907–2006) – ballet dancer and choreographer
- Marko Mušič (born 1941) – architect
- Zoran Mušič (1909–2005) – painter
- Miki Muster (1925–2018) – illustrator
- Veno Pilon (1896–1970) – painter
- Mira Pintar (1891–1980) - artist and art collector
- Jože Plečnik (1872–1957) – architect
- Marjetica Potrč (born 1953) – artist
- Jakob Savinšek (1922–1961) – sculptor
- Zora Stančič (born 1956) – graphic and visual artist
- Matej Sternen (1870–1949) – painter
- Michael Stroy (1803–1871) – painter
- Vladimir Šubic (1894–1946) – architect
- Henrika Šantel (1874–1940) – painter
- Avgusta Šantel (1876–1968) – painter, teacher, printmaker
- Jožef Tominc (1790–1866) – painter
- Joseph Urbania (1877–1943) – sculptor
- Antonija Volk Krebelj (1908–2003) – farmer and folk artist
- Ivan Vurnik (1884–1971) – architect and town planner
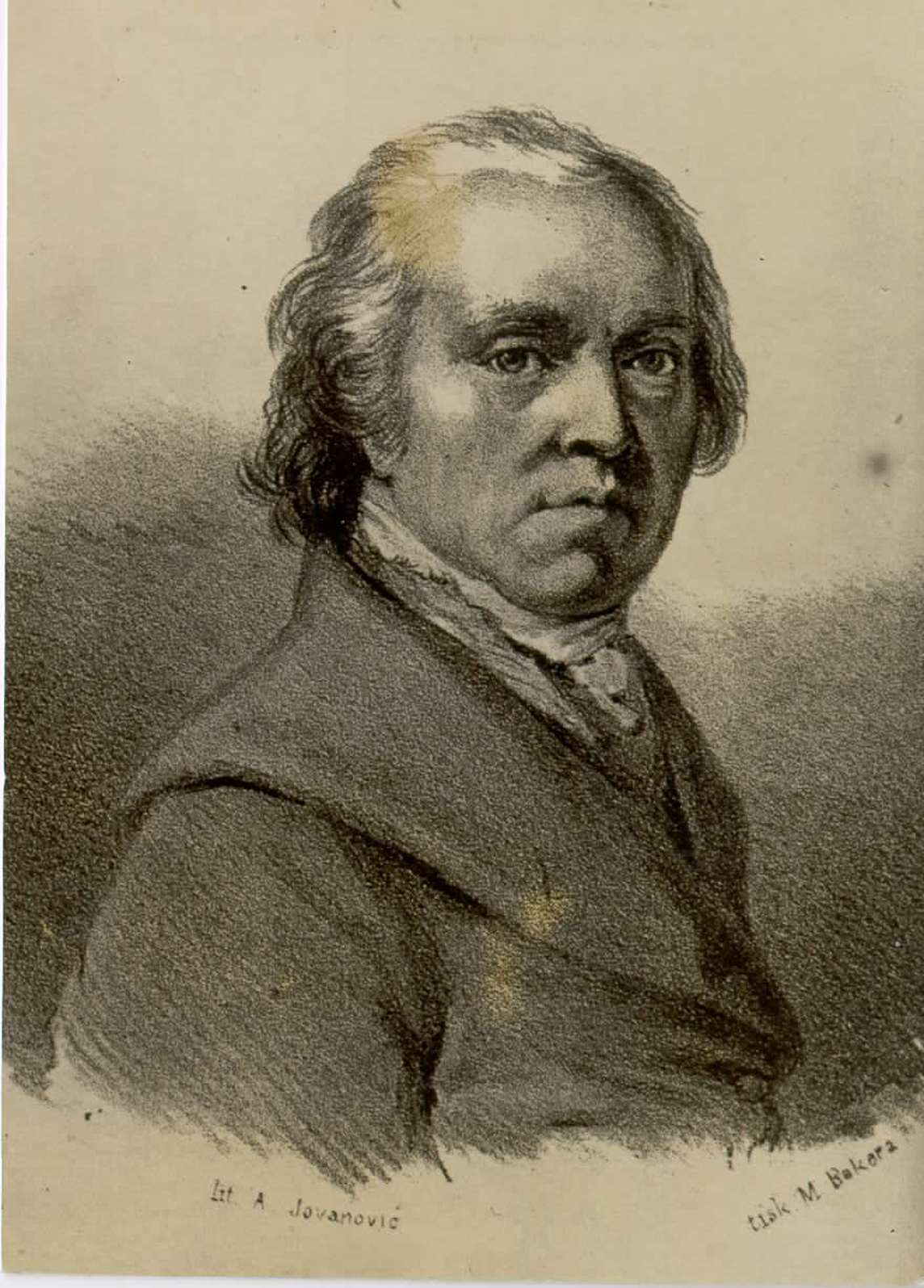
Franz Caucig

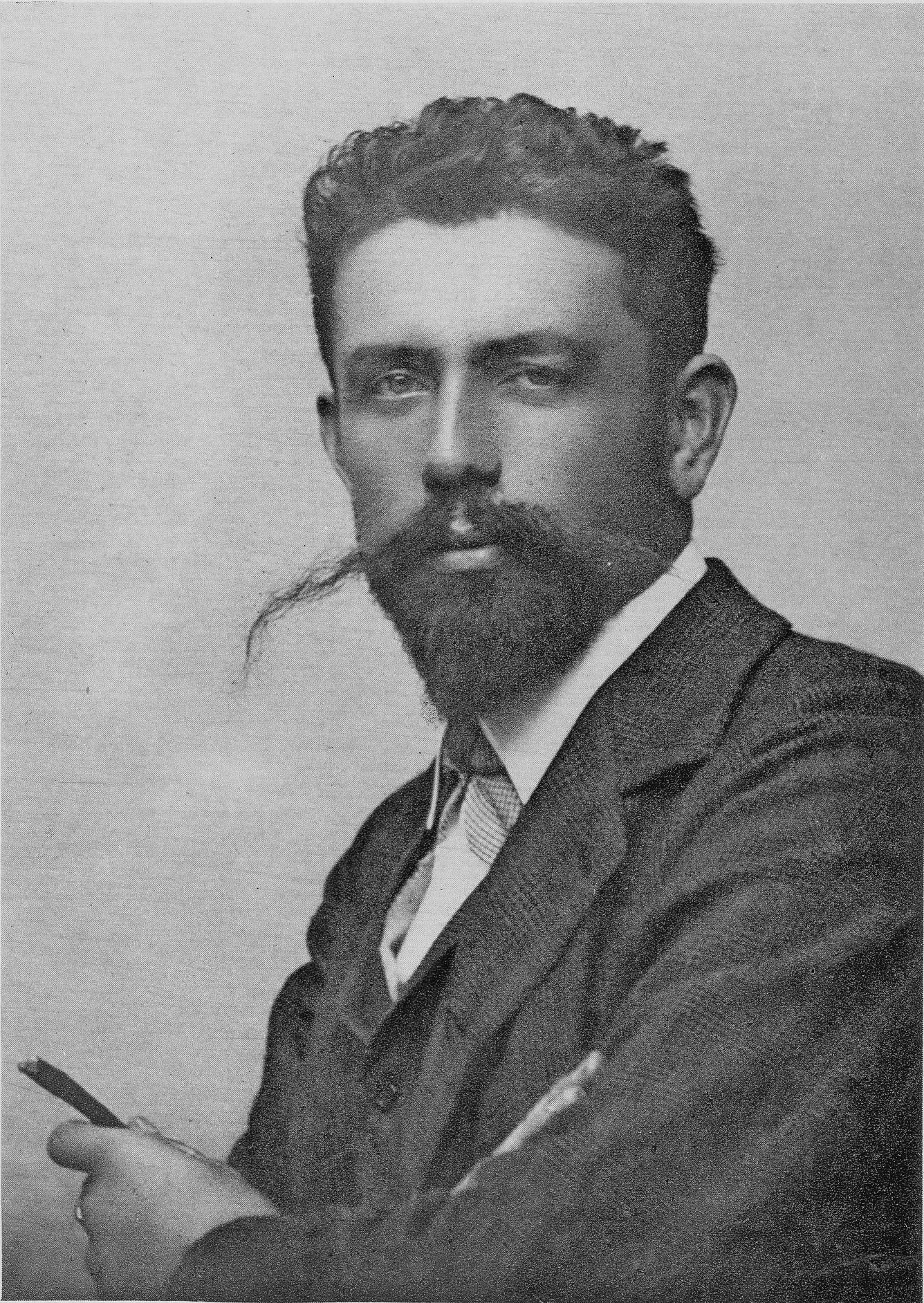
Ivan Grohar

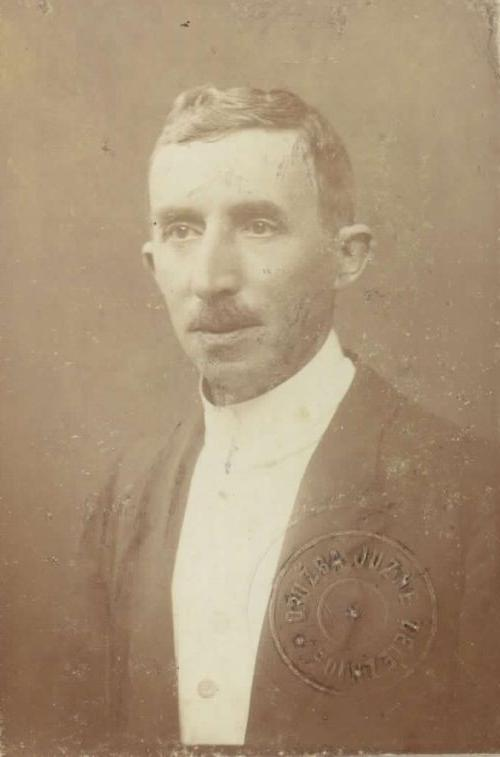
Anton Gvajc

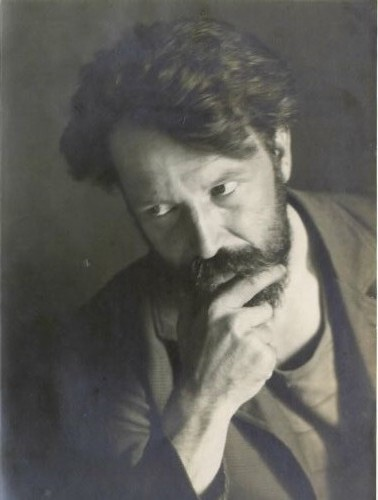
Rihard Jakopič

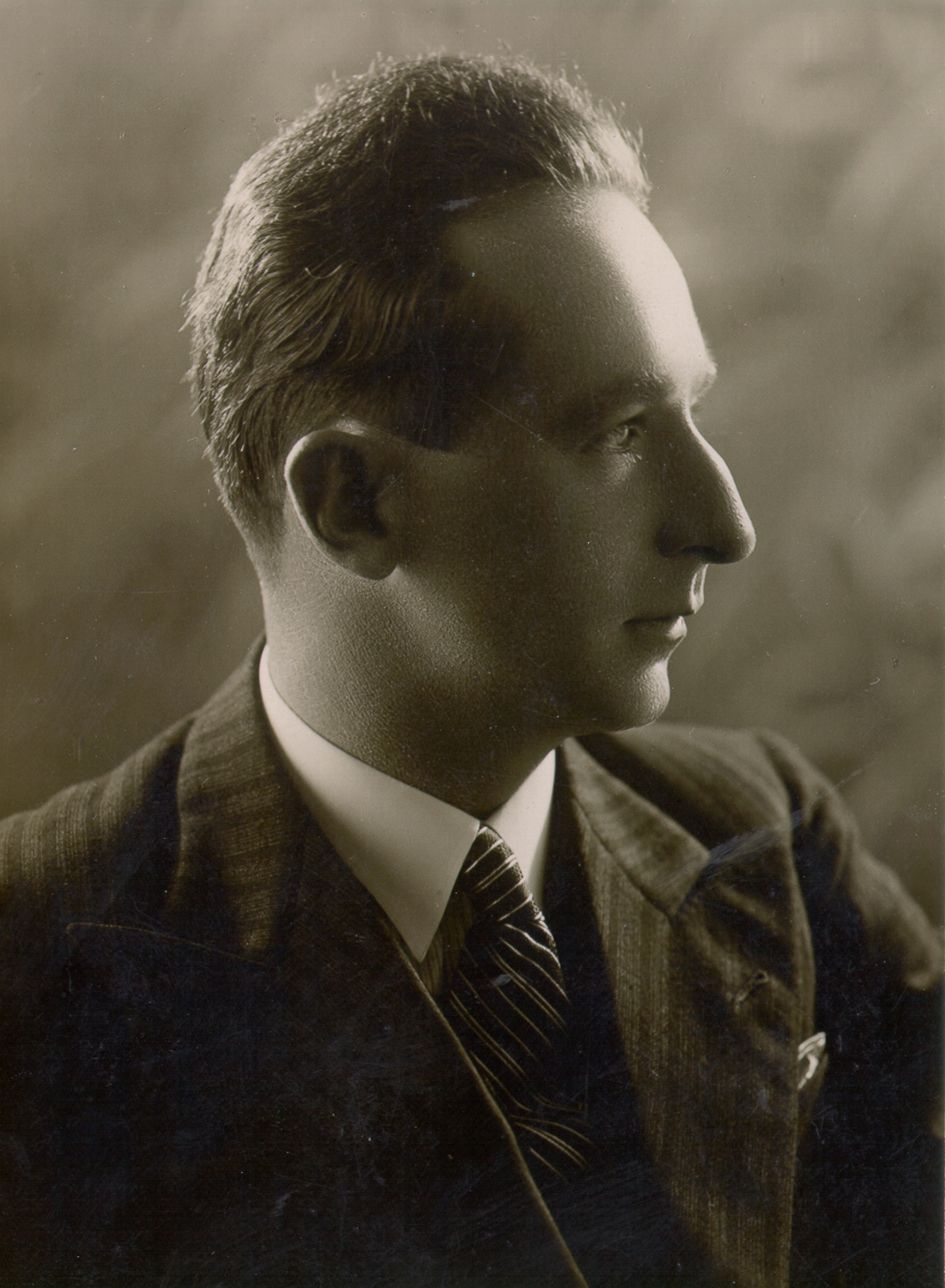
Gojmir Anton Kos

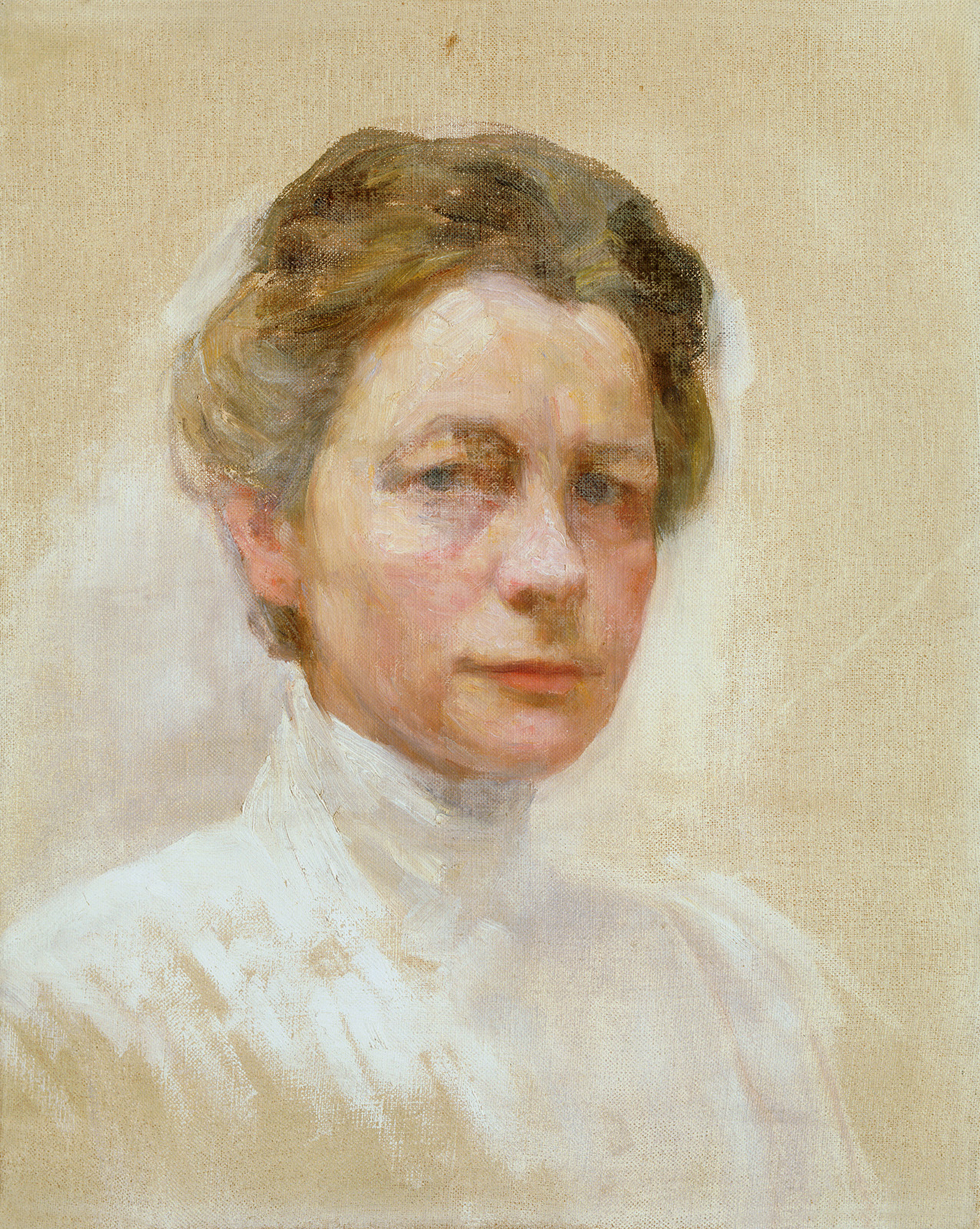
Ivana Kobilca

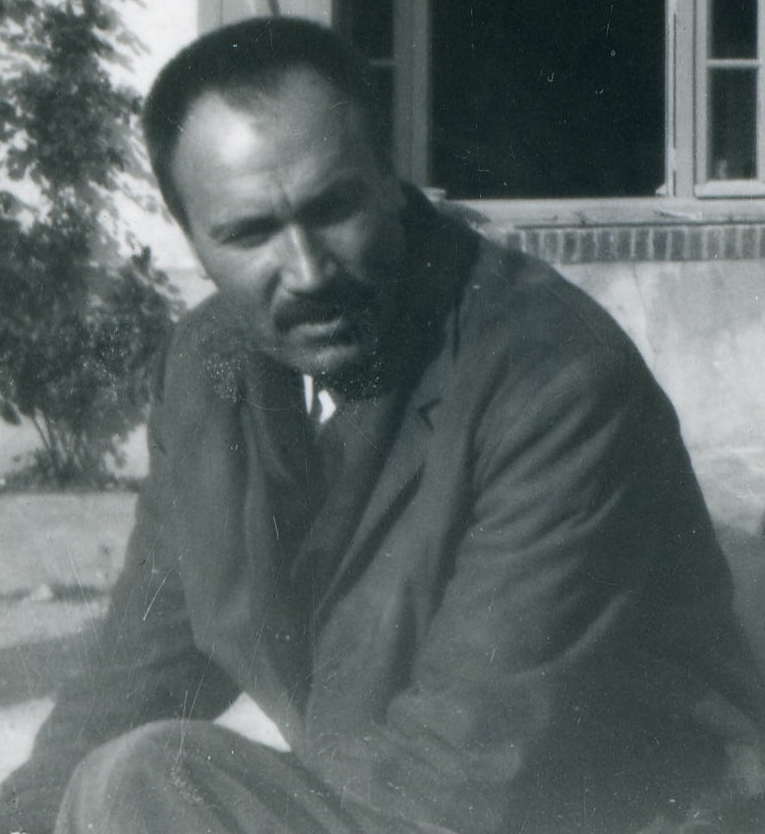
Zoran Mušič

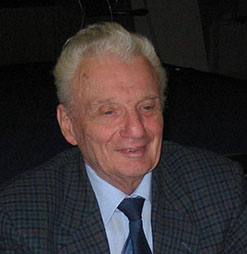
Miki Muster

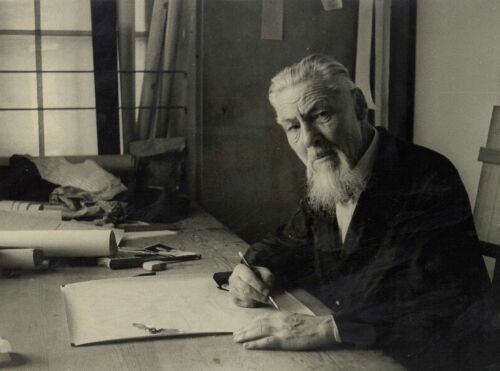
Jože Plečnik

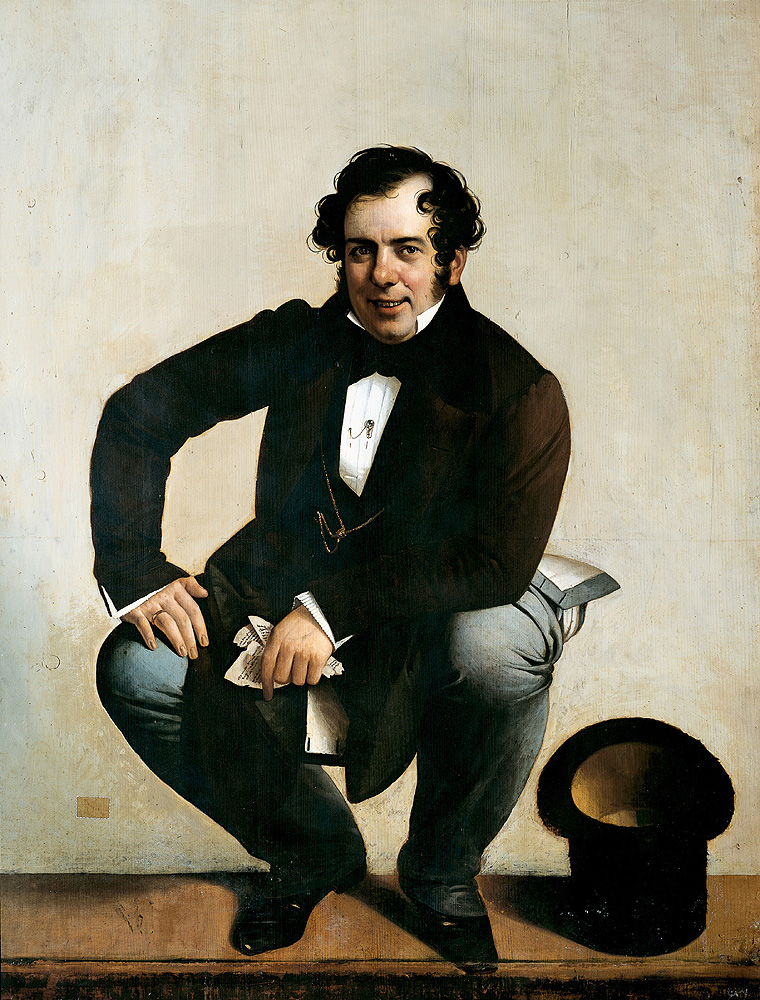
Giuseppe Tominz

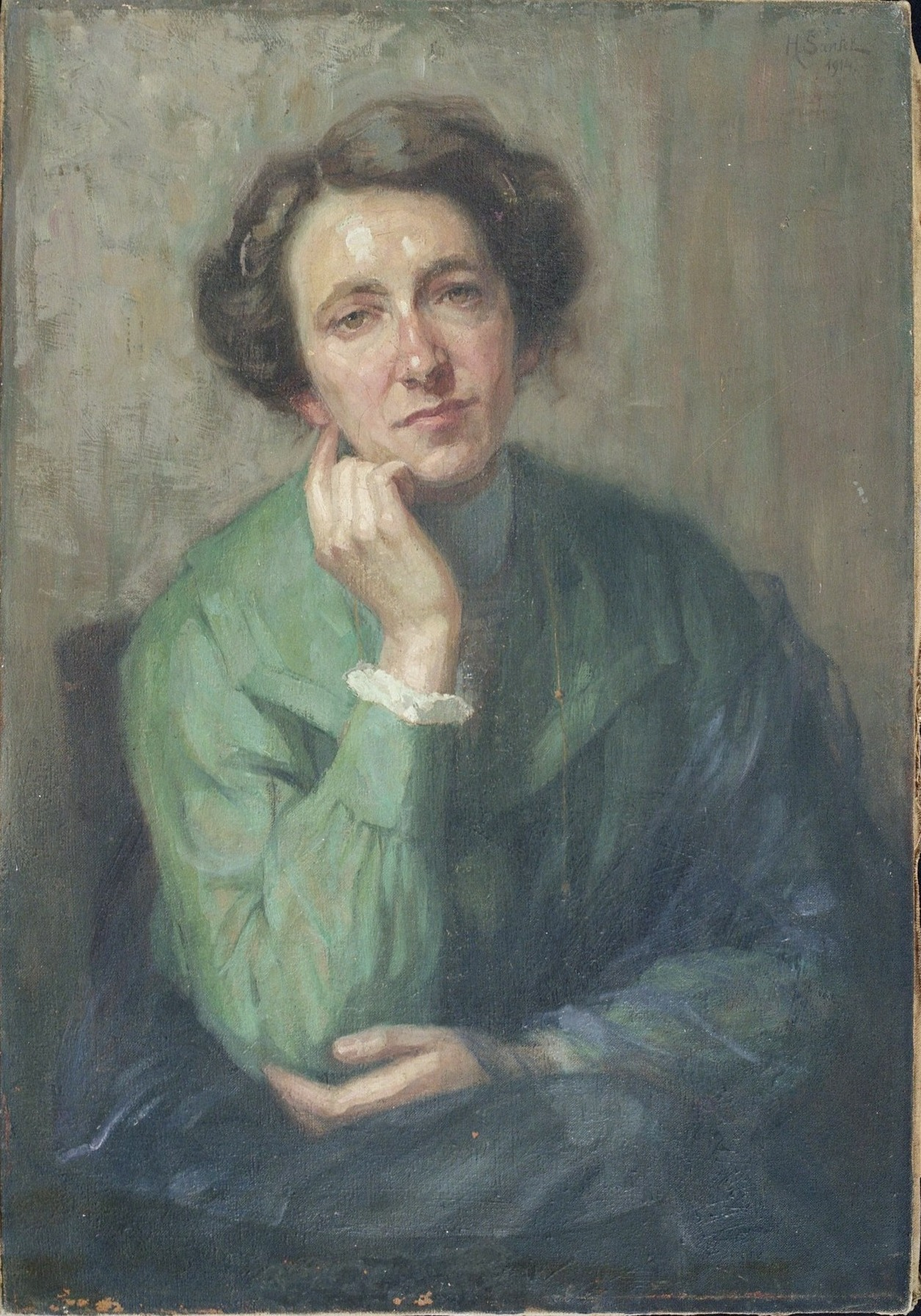
Henrika Šantel

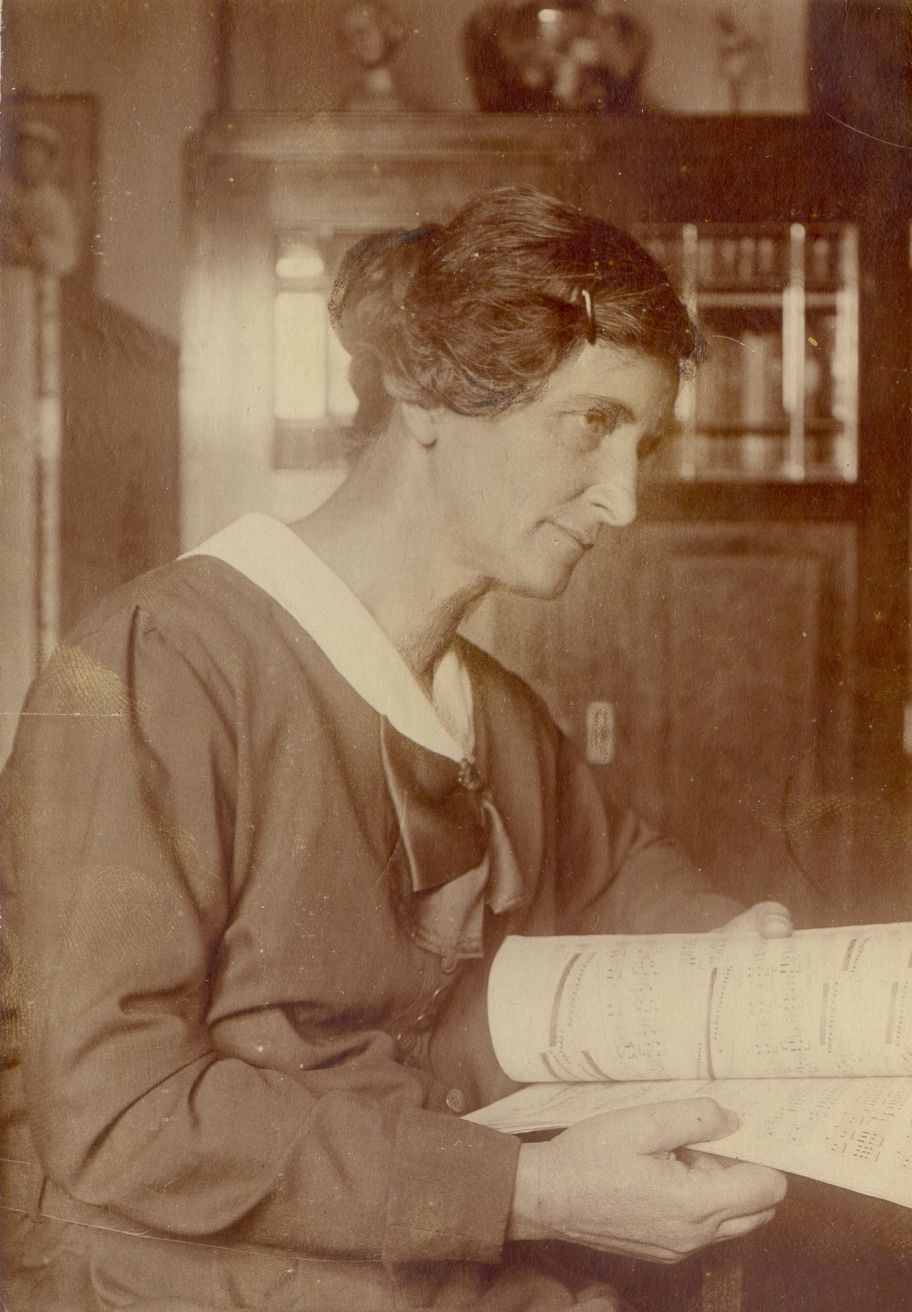
Avgusta Šantel

== Authors ==
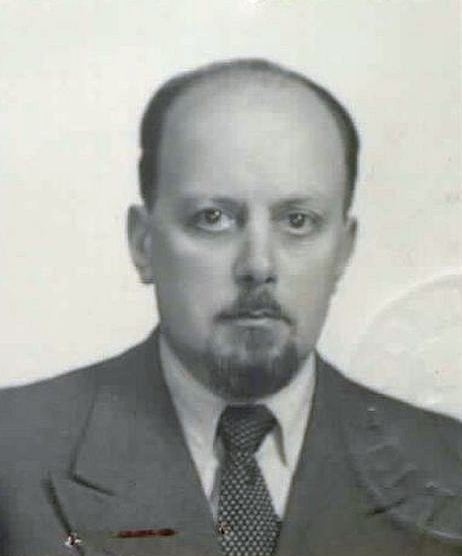
Vladimir Bartol

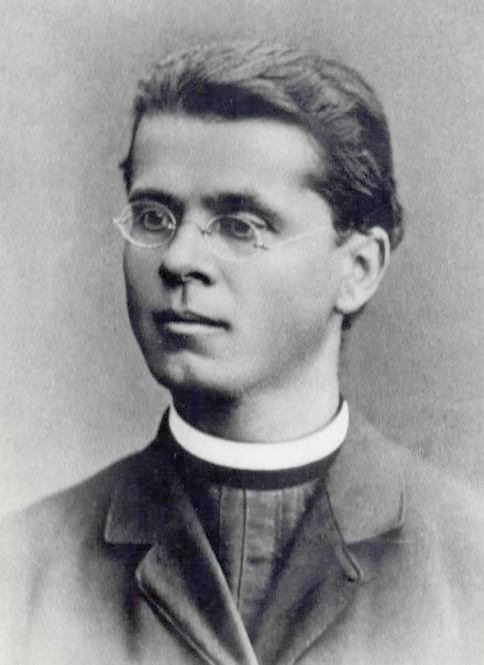
Simon Gregorčič

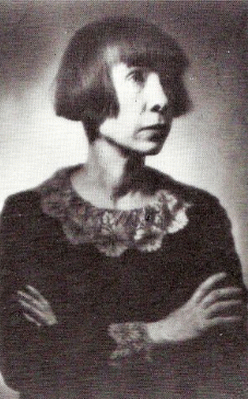
Alma Karlin

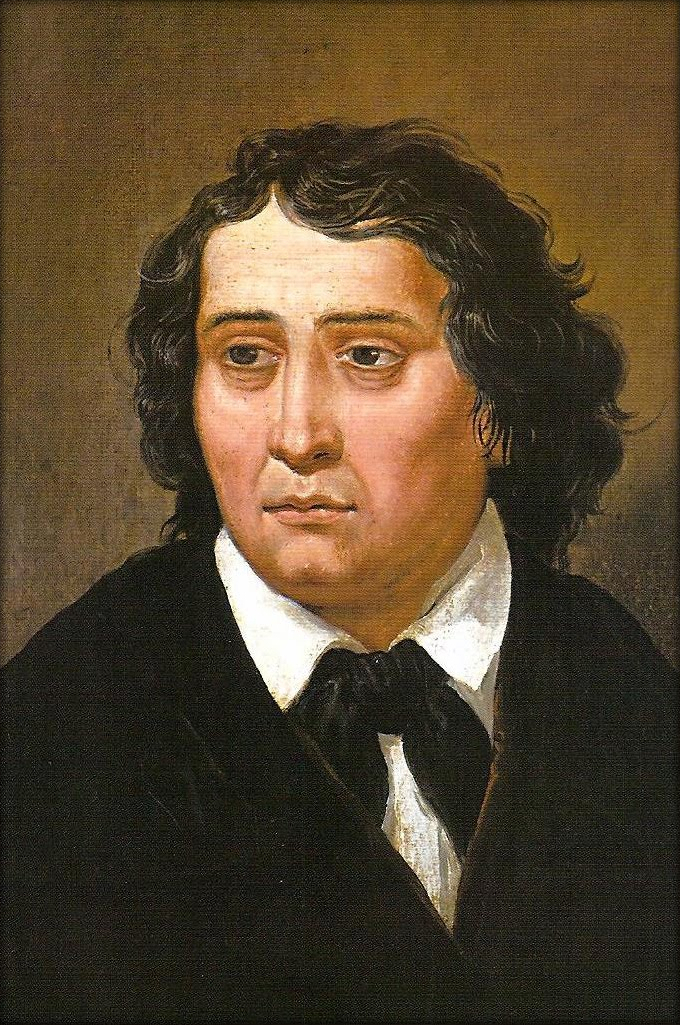
France Prešeren

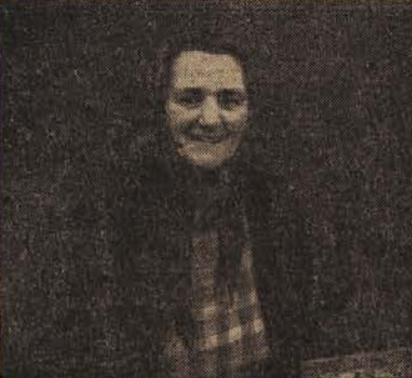
Anka Salmič

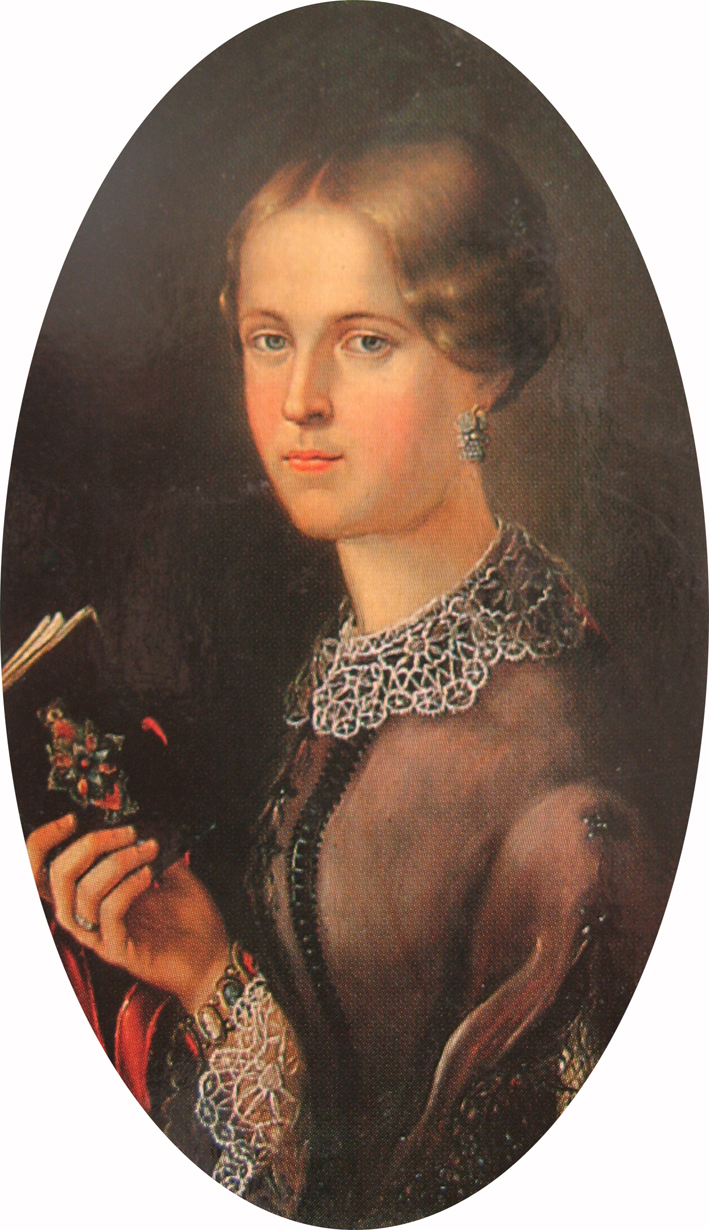
Josipina Urbančič

- Louis Adamic (1898–1951) – author and translator
- Anton Aškerc (1856–1912) – poet and Roman Catholic priest
- Frederic Baraga (1797–1868) – bishop, author
- Vladimir Bartol (1903–1967) – author
- France Bevk (1890–1970) – author
- Franjo Bučar – writer of Slovenian descent
- Ivan Cankar (1876–1918) – author, poet, storyteller, playwright, and essayist
- Matija Čop (1797–1835) – author
- Mate Dolenc (born 1945) – author
- Fran Saleški Finžgar (1871–1963) – author and priest
- France Forstnerič (1933–2007) – author, poet and journalist
- Alojz Gradnik (1882–1967) – poet and translator
- Simon Gregorčič (1844–1906) – poet and Roman Catholic priest
- Peter Handke (born 1942) – author (Slovenian mother; born and raised in Austria and has never lived in Slovenia)
- Janez Jalen (1891–1966) – author
- Drago Jančar (born 1948) – author and dramatist
- Simon Jenko (1835–1869) – poet, lyricist, writer
- Jože Javoršek (1920–1990) – author
- Branka Jurca (1914–1999) – author
- Josip Jurčič (1844–1881) – author
- János Kardos (1801–1875) – writer, teacher and priest
- Alma Karlin (1889–1950) – writer and poet
- Dragotin Kette (1876–1899) – poet
- Edvard Kocbek (1904–1981) – poet and writer
- Srečko Kosovel (1904–1926) – poet
- József Kossics (1788–1867) – writer, poet, historian, priest
- Tomo Križnar (born 1954) – world traveller, humanitarian, author
- Lovro Kuhar (1893–1950) – author
- Miklós Küzmics (1737–1804) – writer and translator
- Feri Lainšček (born 1959) – writer, poet
- Fran Levstik (1831–1887) – author
- Anton Tomaž Linhart (1756–1795) – playwright and historian
- Cvetka Lipuš (born 1959) – author
- Florjan Lipuš (born 1937) – author
- Franko Luin (1941–2005) – author, editor, typographer
- Rudolf Maister (1874–1934) – poet, military officer
- Mira Mihelič (1912–1985) – author
- Frane Milčinski (1914–1988) – poet, satirist, humorist
- Miha Mazzini (born 1961) – author
- Boris Pahor (1913–2022) – author
- Ivan Potrč (1913–1993) – author
- Krista Povirk (1938–2004) – catechist, poet, choir director
- Sebastijan Pregelj (born 1970) – author
- France Prešeren (1800–1849) – poet
- Benka Pulko (born 1967) – author and Guinness World Record setting world traveler
- Miha Remec (1928–2020) – author
- Marija Rus (1921–2019) – Romance philologist, professor of French, translator, poet.
- Anton Martin Slomšek (1800–1862) – bishop, author, poet and national awakener
- Tomaž Šalamun (1941–2014) – poet
- Anka Salmič (1902–1969) - farmer, folk healer and poet
- Damijan Šinigoj (born 1964) – author and translator
- Josip Stritar (1836–1923) – poet, author, and editor
- Ivan Tavčar (1851–1923) – author, lawyer and politician
- Janez Trdina (1830–1905) – author
- Primož Trubar (1508–1586) – Protestant reformer and author
- Josipina Urbančič (1508–1586) – poet, writer
- Josip Vidmar (1895–1992) – essayist and literary critic
- Vitomil Zupan (1914–1987) – writer

== Inventors ==
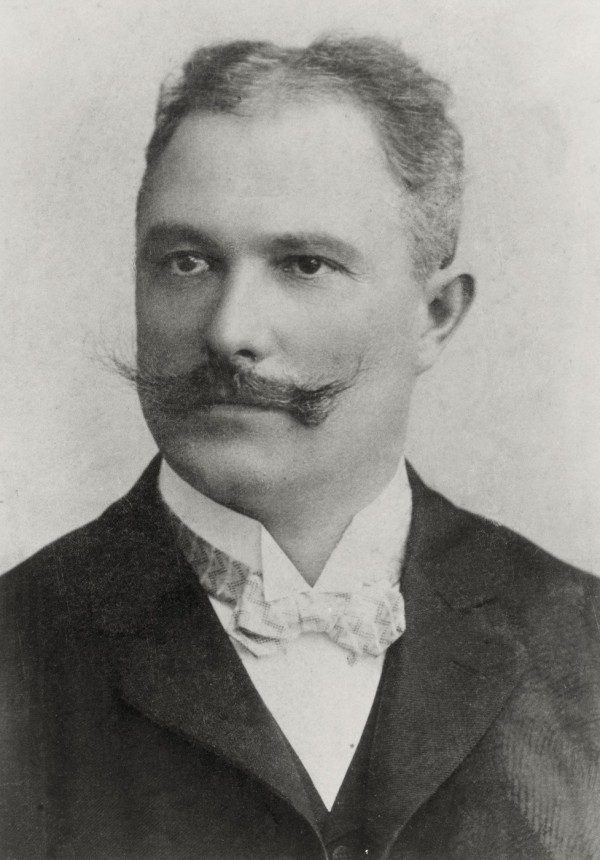
Janez Puh

- Ivo Boscarol (born 1956) – light aircraft designer and manufacturer
- Joseph Fuisz (born 1970) – filed thirty-five patents relating to drug delivery and computer fields
- Richard Fuisz (born 1939) – pharmaceutical inventor of controlled release drug beads, quick dissolve tablet systems, thin film drug delivery systems as well as various medical devices, diagnostic devices and electronic mail patents
- Japec Jakopin (born 1951) – yacht designer
- Alojz Knafelc (1859–1937) – creator of Slovenian trail blaze
- Herman Potočnik (a.k.a. Noordung, 1892–1929), one of the founders of astronautics
- Johann Puch (Slovene: Janez Puh) (1862–1914) – inventor, innovator, industrial designer and manufacturer
- Johann Pucher (Slovene: Janez Auguštin Puhar) (1814–1864) – priest, photographer, painter and poet – invented a photography on the glass in 1842.
- Edvard Rusjan (1886–1911) – pilot and aeronautic pioneer

== Military personnel ==
- Karel Destovnik Kajuh (1922–1944) – poet and Yugoslav people's hero
- Alenka Ermenc (born 1963) – officer in the Slovenian Armed Forces and NATO's Chief of defence
- Karl Novak (1905–1975) – commander of the Slovene Chetniks during World War II
- Odilo Globočnik (1904–1945) – prominent Nazi and later an SS leader
- Anton Haus (1851–1917) – Grand Admiral of the Austro-Hungarian Navy
- Pepca Kardelj (1914–1990) – partisan and political activist
- Johann Katzianer (1491–1539) – aristocrat and Habsburg Imperial Army commander
- Dušan Kveder (1915–1966) – soldier, military commander and diplomat
- Rudolf Maister (1874–1934) – general and poet
- Franjo Malgaj (1894–1919) – Austro-Hungarian military leader
- Johann Mickl (1893–1945) – Austrian-born Generalleutnant of Slovenian descent
- Leon Rupnik (1880–1946) – Yugoslav general, inspector-general of the Slovenian Home Guard
- Franc Rozman (1911–1944) – Partisan general and Yugoslav people's hero
- Valerija Skrinjar Tvrz (1928–2023) – Partisan codebreaker
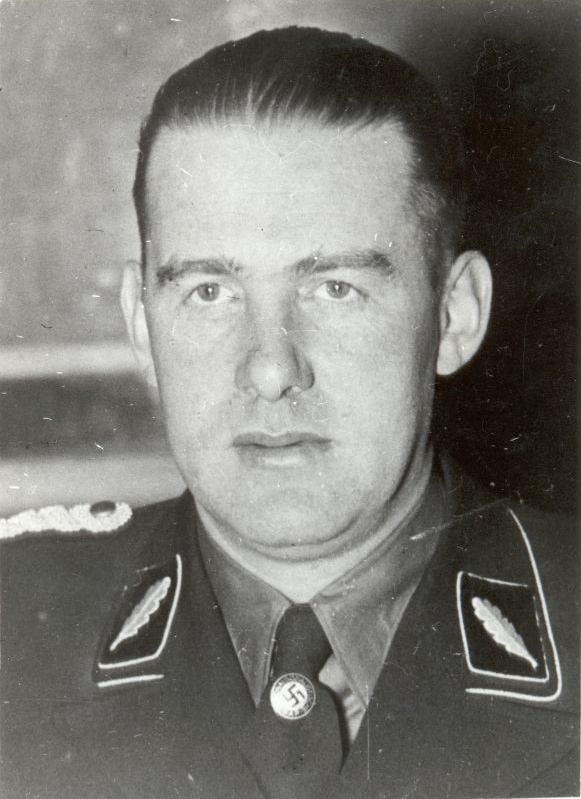
Odilo Globocnik

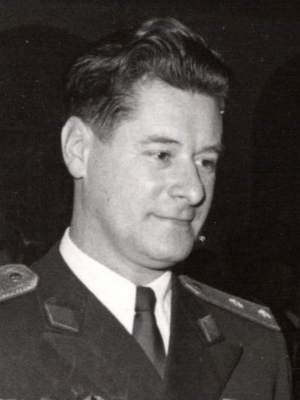
Dušan Kveder

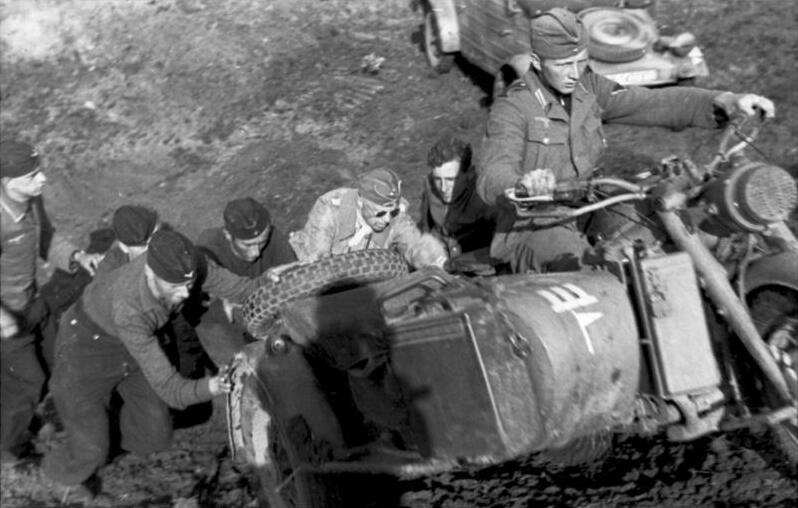
Johann Mickl

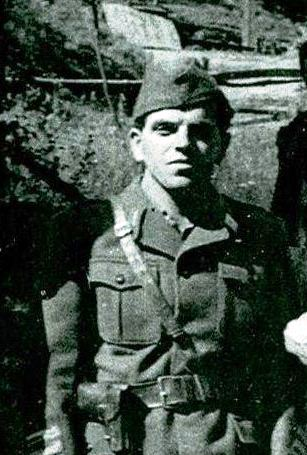
Franc Rozman

== Film, radio and television ==
- Vinci Vogue Anžlovar (1963–2024) – film director
- Valentin Areh (born 1971) – war correspondent and TV journalist
- Miha Baloh (1928–2022) – actor
- Matija Barl (1940–2018) – actor
- Polde Bibič (1933–2012) – actor
- Demeter Bitenc (1922–2018) – actor
- David Boreanaz (born 1969) – actor, father of remote Slovenian descent
- Špela Čadež (born 1977) – film director
- František Čap (1913–1972) – film director
- Anica Dobra (born 1963) – Serbian actress, Slovenian mother
- George Dolenz (1908–1963) – (born Jure Dolenc) movie/TV actor, father of actor/musician Micky Dolenz and grandfather of actress Ami Dolenz
- Micky Dolenz (born 1945) – actor and musician, son of George Dolenz
- Rudi Dolezal (born 1958) – Austrian film producer and film director
- Mira Furlan (1955–2021) – actress, father of Slovenian descent
- Karpo Godina (born 1943) – film director, cameraman and montage editor
- Frank Gorshin (1933–2005) – actor and comedian
- Melissa Joan Hart (born 1976) – actress, mother of Slovenian descent
- Andrej Hieng (1925–2000) – storyteller, dramatist, film director and stage editor
- Boštjan Hladnik (1929–2006) – film director, scenarist and montage editor
- Željko Ivanek – Hollywood actor
- Anthony Jeselnik (born 1978) – comedian of Slovenian descent
- Polona Juh (born 1971) – actress
- Damjan Kozole (born 1964) – film director and scenarist
- Janez Lapajne (born 1967) – film director
- Jože Pogačnik (1932–2016) – film director and scenarist
- Igor Pretnar (1924–1977) – film and theatre director
- Janko Ravnik (1891–1982) – film director, pianist, composer, pedagogue, and photographer
- Tanja Ribič (born 1968) – actress and singer
- Ita Rina (1907–1979) – actress
- Franci Slak (1953–2007) – film and TV director and scenarist
- Danijel Sraka (born 1975) – film director
- France Štiglic (1919–1993) – film director
- Zlatko Šugman (1932–2008) – actor
- Aleksandar Tesla (born 1973) – German actor, Slovenian mother
- Alice Tumler (born 1978) – TV presenter, father of Slovenian–Italian descent
- Eka Vogelnik (1946–2024) – multi type artist (film, video and animation director and performer; scene, costume and puppet designer; book author and illustrator, music composer...)
- Christoph Waltz (born 1956) – actor, mother of Slovenian descent
- Jonas Žnidaršič (born 1962) – actor and TV journalist
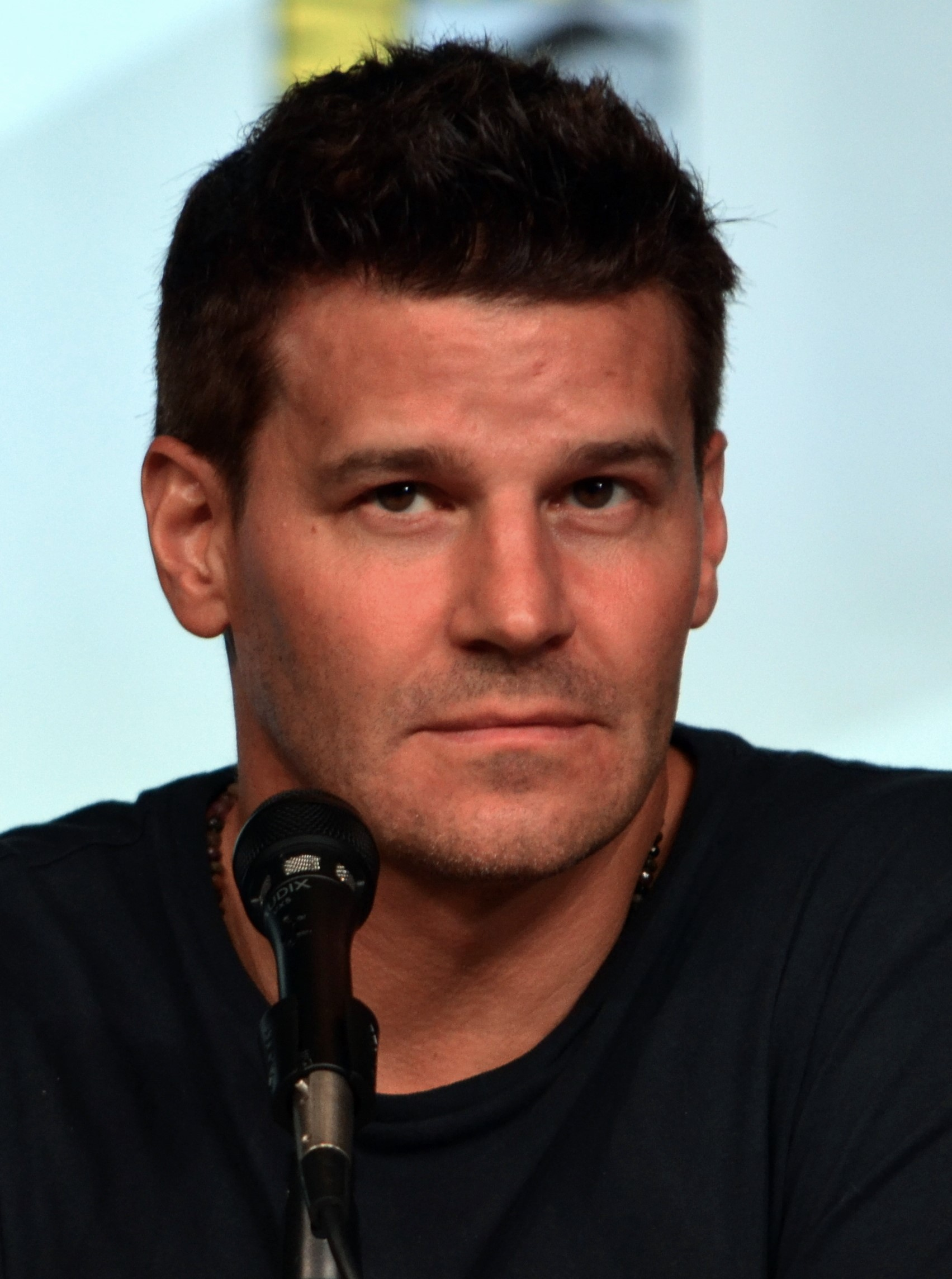
David Boreanaz

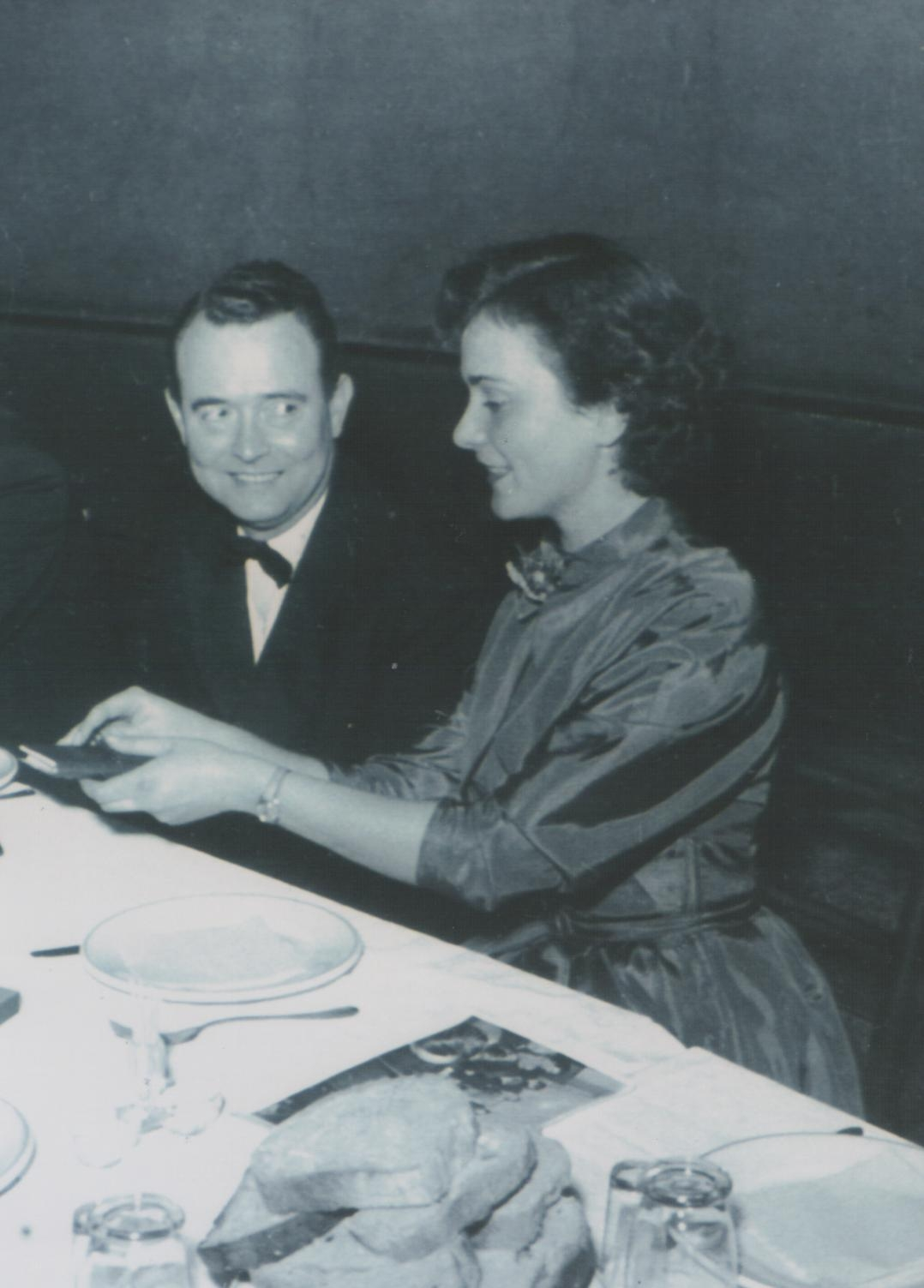
František Čáp

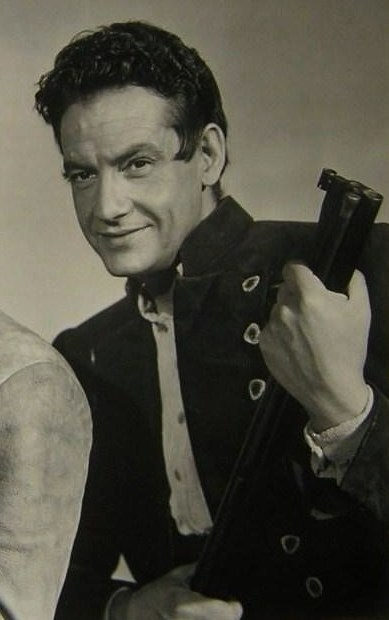
George Dolenz

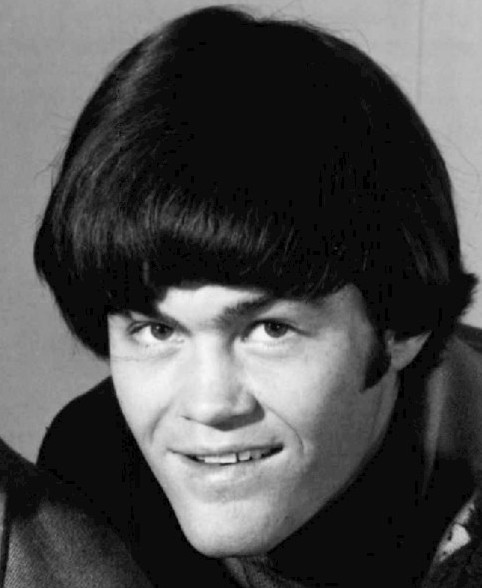
Micky Dolenz

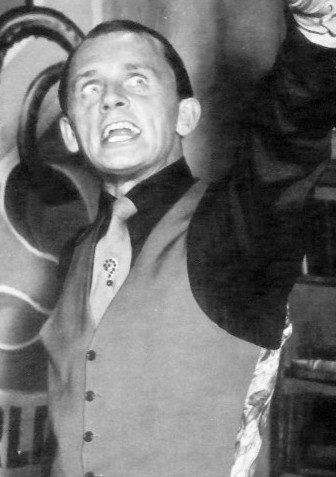
Frank Gorshin

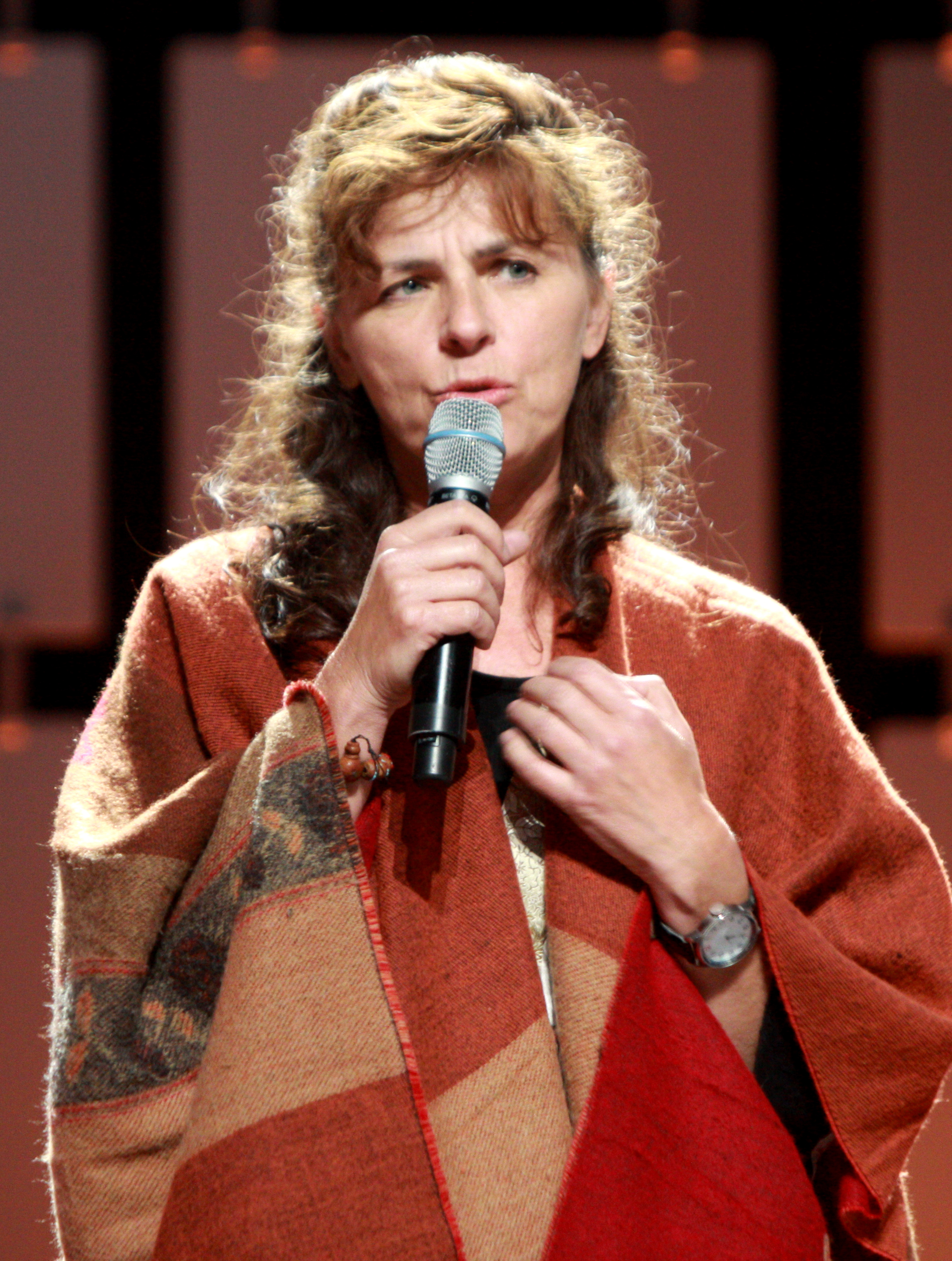
Mira Furlan

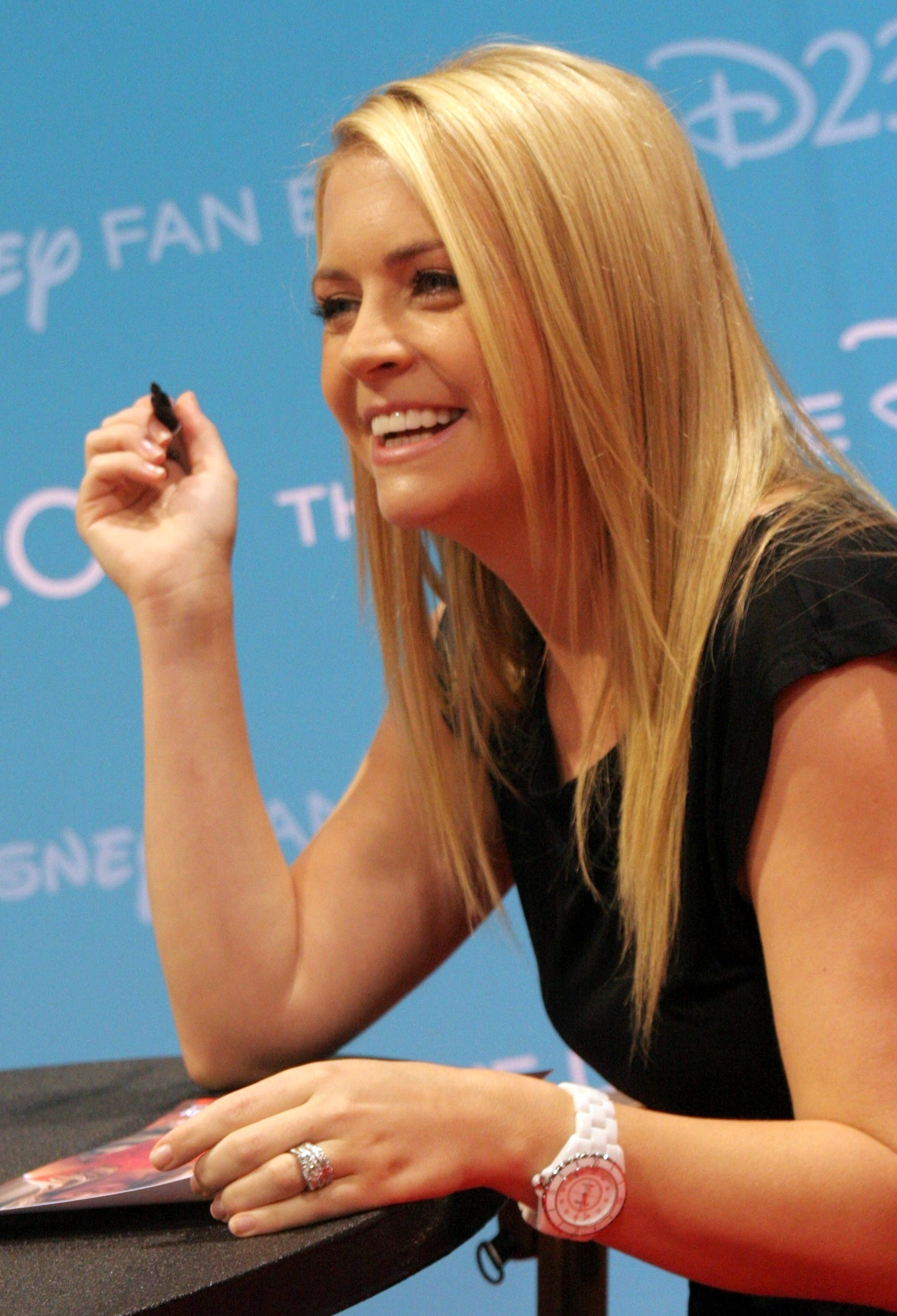
Melissa Joan Hart

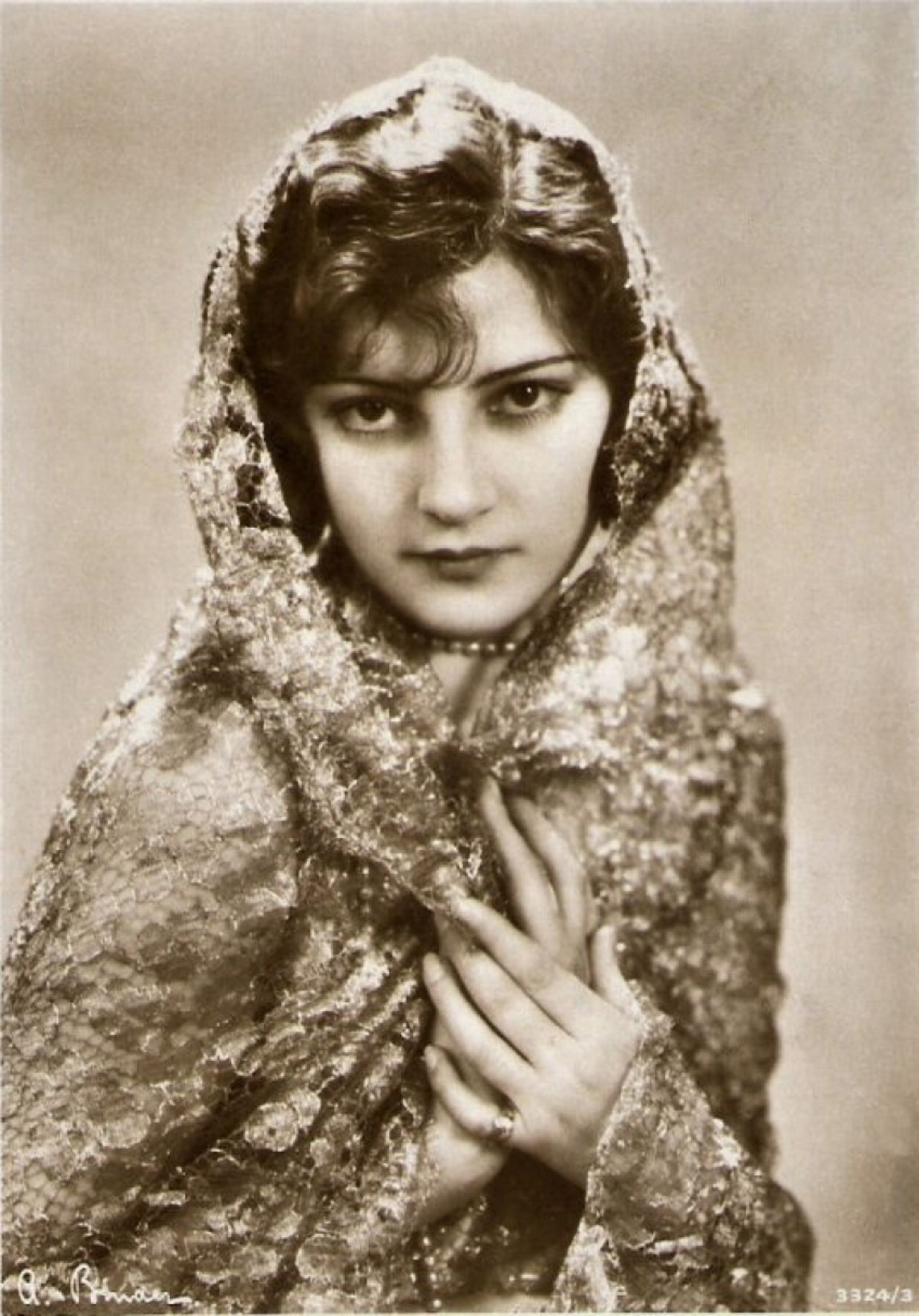
Ita Rina

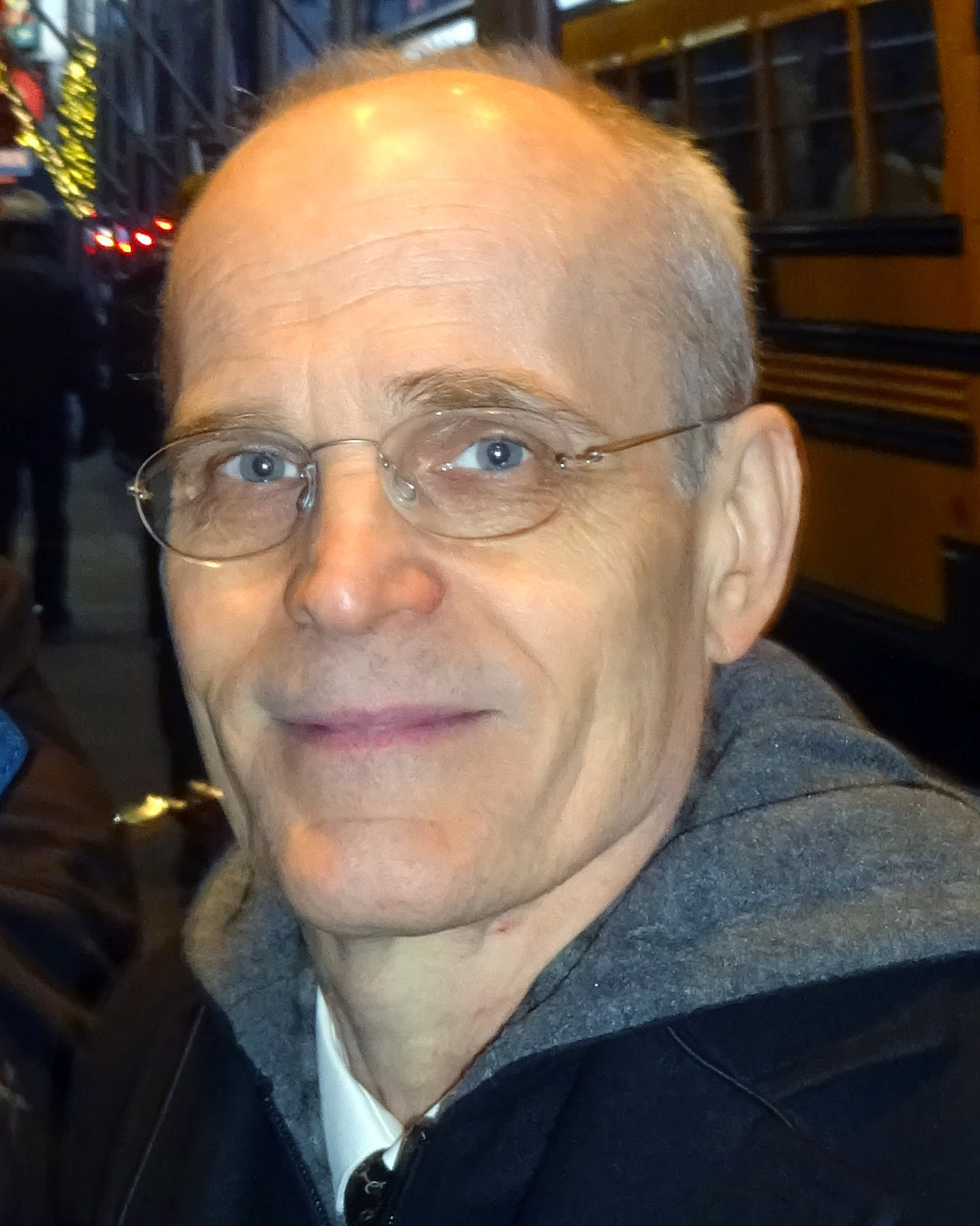
Željko Ivanek

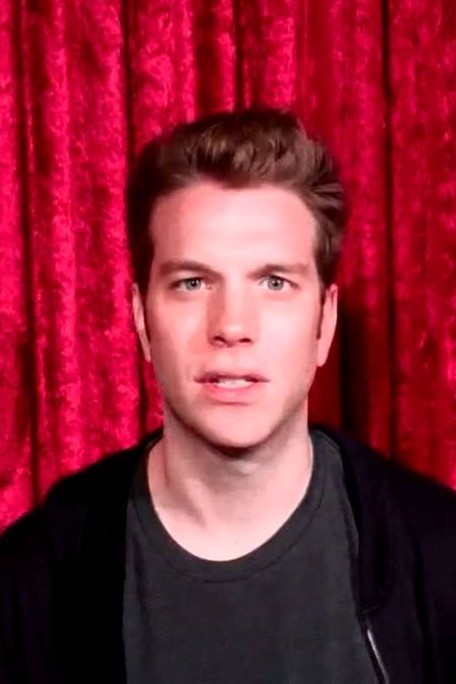
Anthony Jeselnik

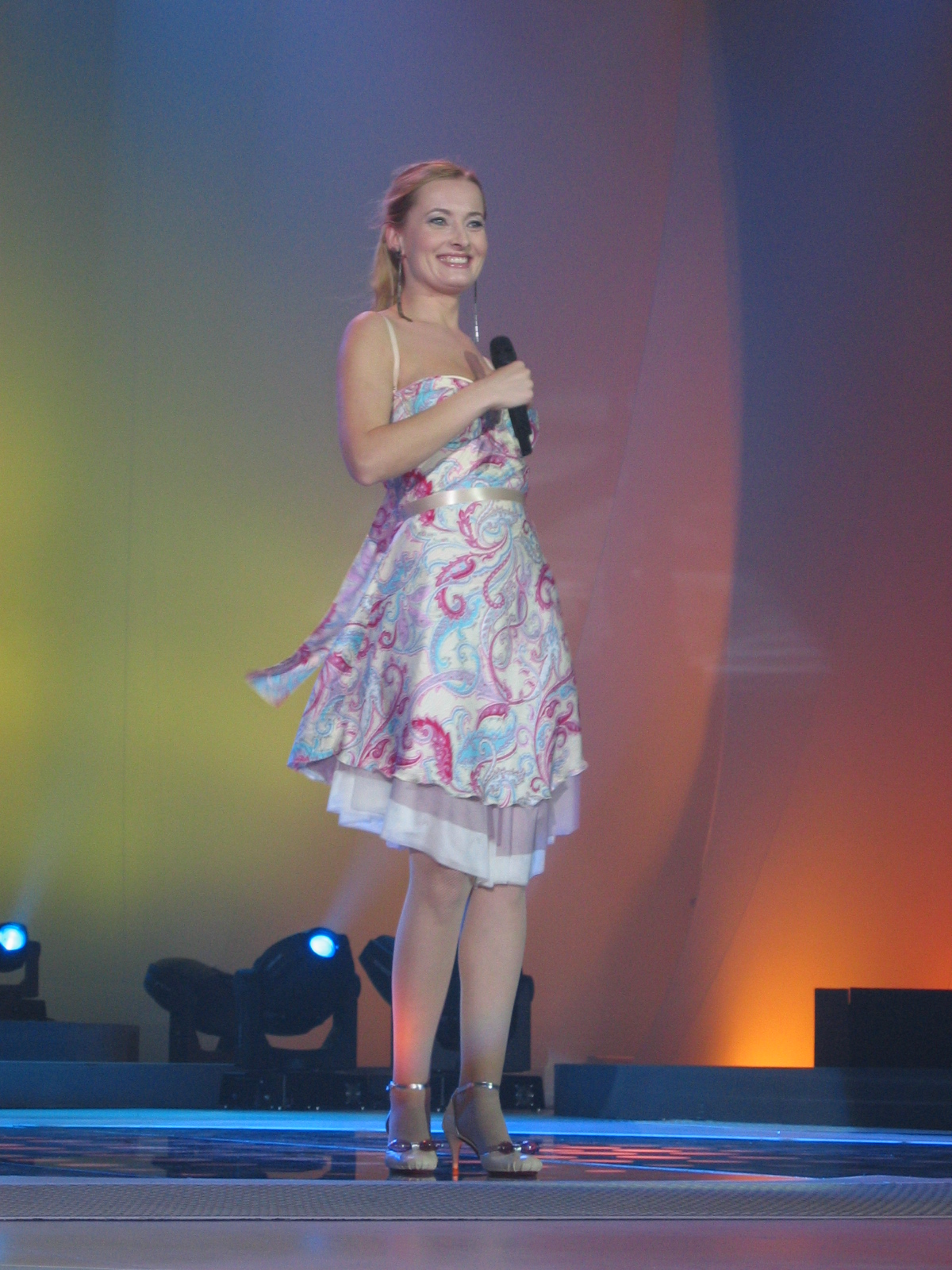
Tanja Ribič

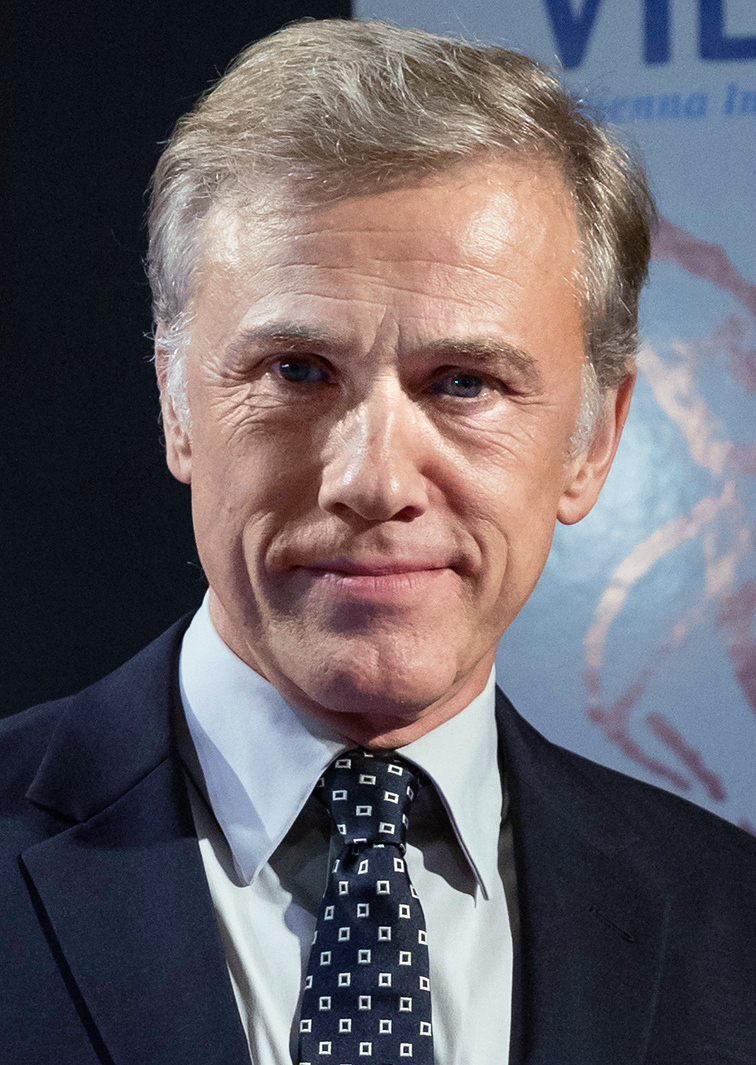
Christoph Waltz

== Musicians and composers ==
- Bojan Adamič (1912–1995) – composer and conductor
- Blaž Arnič (1901–1970) – composer
- Slavko Avsenik (1929–2015) – composer and musician
- Helena Blagne Zaman (born 1963) – singer
- Lojze Bratuž (1902–1937) – composer, choirmaster
- Ciril Cvetko (1920–1999) – composer, conductor, pedagogue, and journalist
- Micky Dolenz (born 1945) – drummer of The Monkees (Slovenian father; born and raised in the United States and has never lived in Slovenia)
- Jakob Gallus Petelin (1550–1591) – composer and conductor
- Jani Golob (born 1948) – composer and violinist
- Irena Grafenauer (born 1957) – flautist
- Alenka Gotar (born 1979) – soprano singer
- Eliza Frančiška Grizold (1847–1913) – teacher, poet, organist and composer
- Senida Hajdarpašić (known as Senidah) (born 1985) – singer and composer
- Marija Hladnik Berden (1892–1924) – teacher, organist and composer
- Karen Kamensek (born 1970) – conductor of Slovenian descent
- Božidar Kantušer (1921–1999) – composer
- Herbert von Karajan (1908–1989) – composer
- Maja Keuc – singer
- Marjan Kozina (1907–1966) – composer
- Zala Kralj (born 1999) – singer
- Minca Krkovič (1858–1933) – field labourer and folk singer
- Lina Kuduzović (born 2002) – singer
- Dragica Legat Košmerl (1883–1956) – zither player, zither teacher, and composer
- Marijan Lipovšek (1910–1995) – composer, pianist, pedagogue, musical essayist
- Marjana Lipovšek (born 1946) – opera singer, mezzo-soprano
- Magnifico (born 1965) – composer and singer
- Joey Miskulin (born 1949) – accordionist of Slovenian descent
- Omar Naber – singer-songwriter, guitarist
- Mr. Doctor – vocalist and composer of the Devil Doll
- Tito in ekšn – punk rock band of the 1990s
- Tomaž Pengov – composer, musician and singer
- Zoran Predin (born 1958) – composer and singer
- Oto Pestner – composer, musician and singer
- Friderika Podgornik – pianist and music educator
- Jože Privšek (1937–1998) – composer and musician
- Raay (Maraaya) (born 1984) – composer
- Ana Roner Lavrič (1869–1957) - organist
- Anja Rupel (born 1966) – singer and radio announcer
- Gašper Šantl (born 1996) – singer and composer
- Nina Šenk (born 1982) – classical composer
- Majda Sepe (1937–2006) – singer
- September – Swedish singer of Slovenian descent
- Lojze Slak (1932–2011) – composer and musician
- Adi Smolar – composer, musician and singer
- Ana Soklič – singer-songwriter
- Karmen Stavec (born 1973) – musician and singer
- Dubravka Tomšič Srebotnjak (born 1940) – pianist and musical pedagogue
- Audrey Totter (1917–2013) – actress (Slovenian father; born and lived in the United States; never lived in Slovenia)
- Marjetka Vovk (Maraaya) (born 1984) – singer and composer
- Sare Havliček (born 1974) – musical producer
- Hugo Wolf (1860–1903) – composer
- "Weird Al" Yankovic (born 1959) – singer and musician of Slovenian descent
- Frankie Yankovic (1915–1998) – Grammy-award winning accordion player and polka musician of Slovenian descent
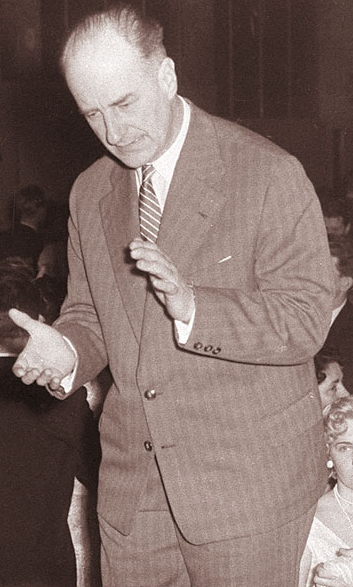
Bojan Adamič

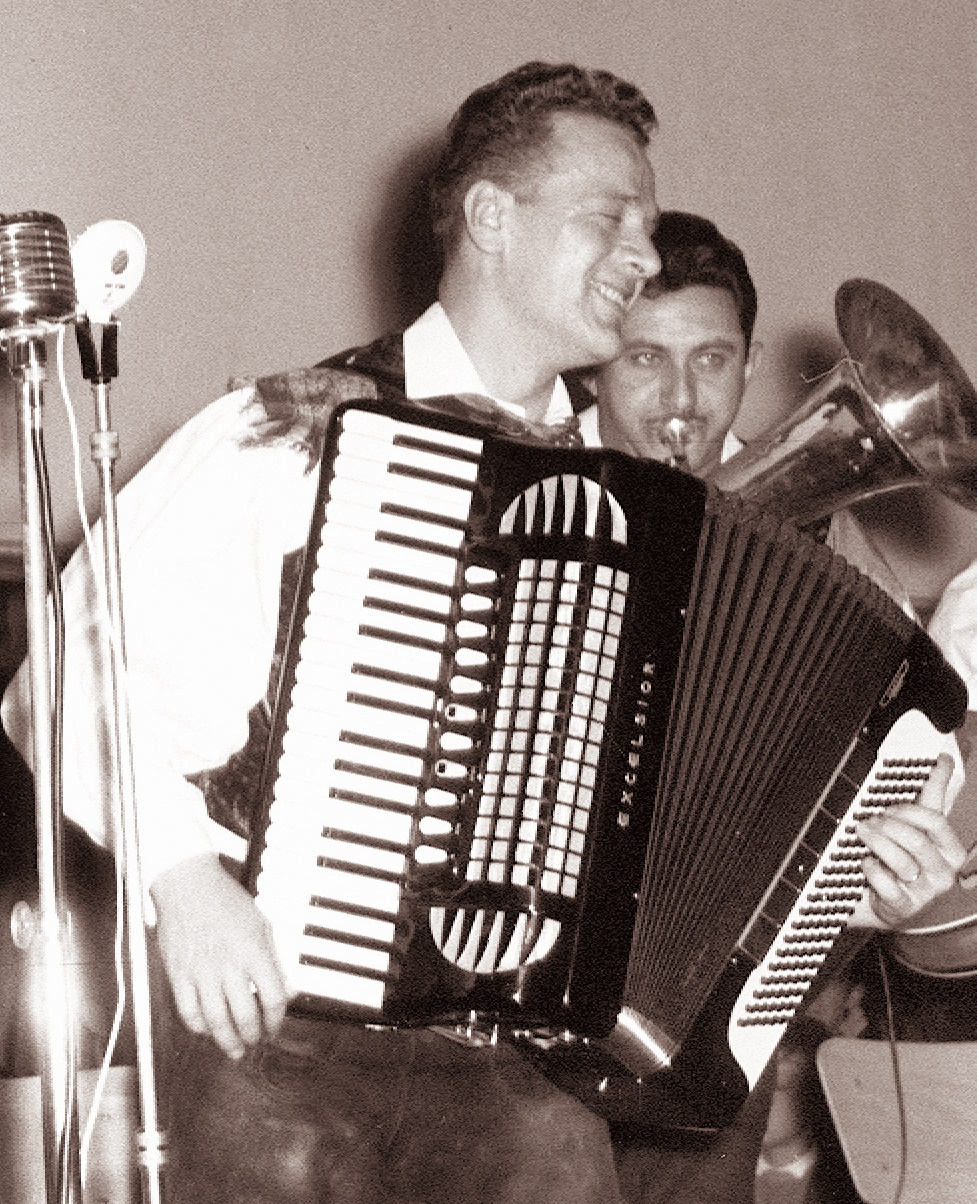
Slavko Avsenik

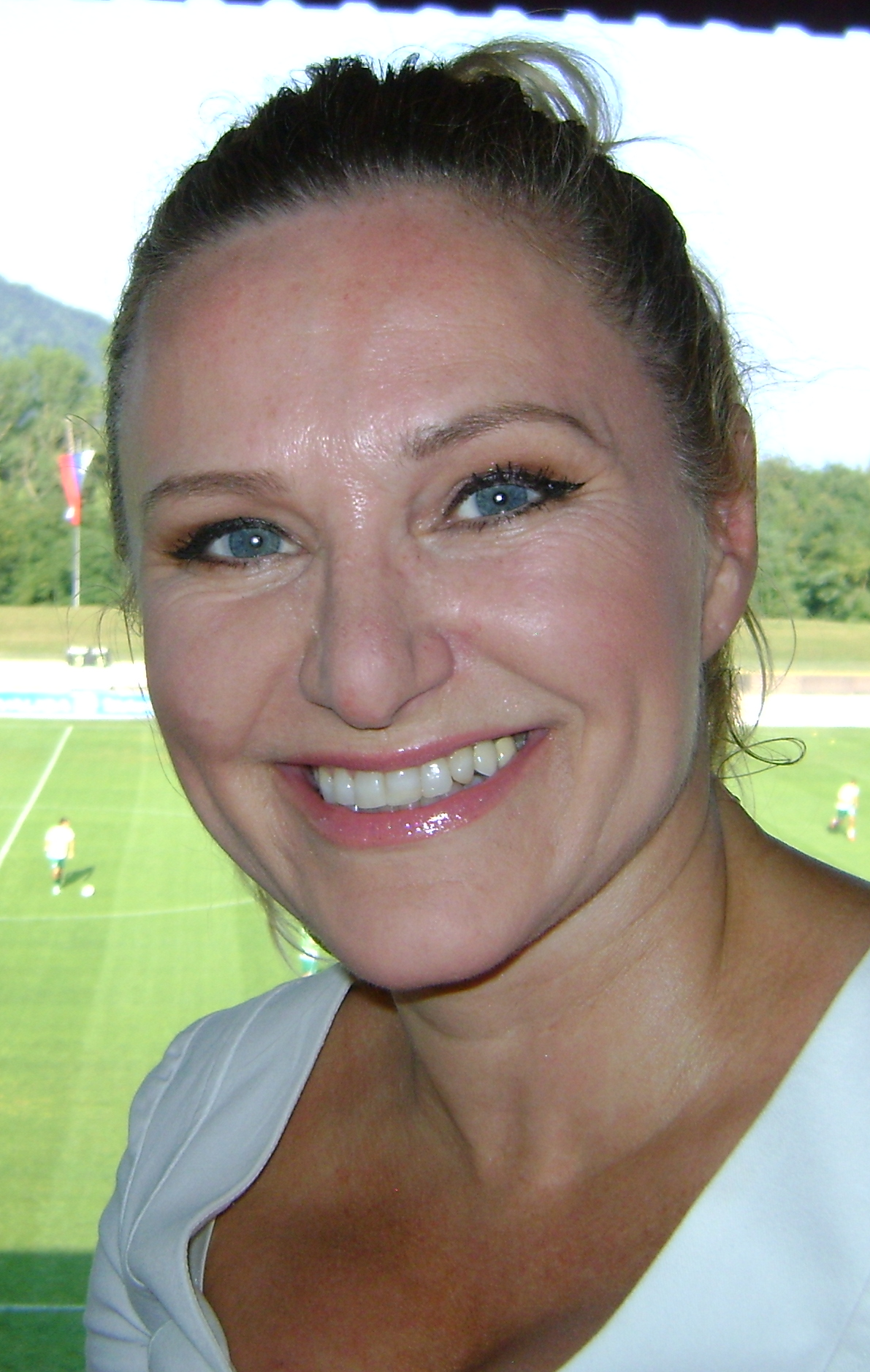
Nuša Derenda

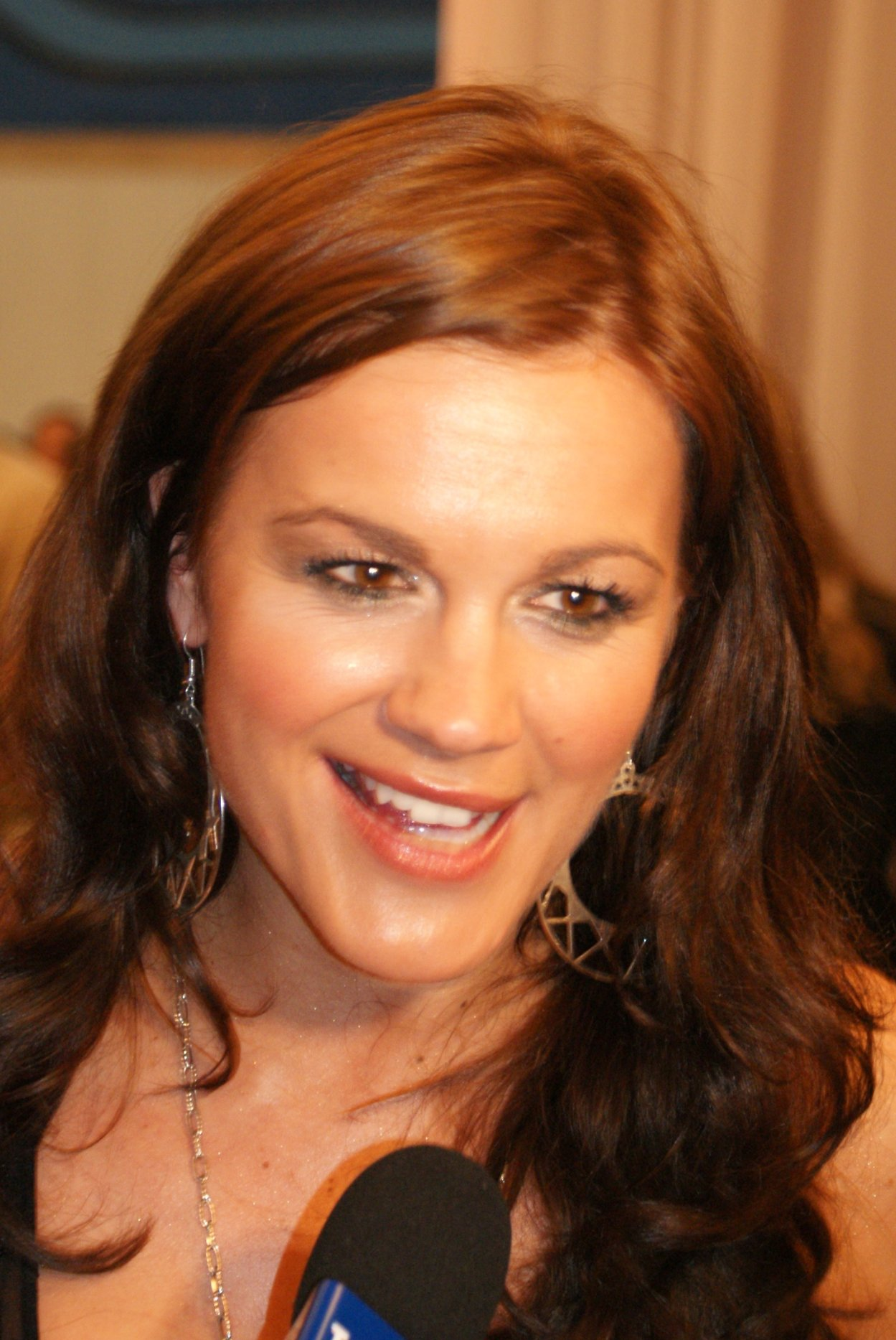
Rebeka Dremelj

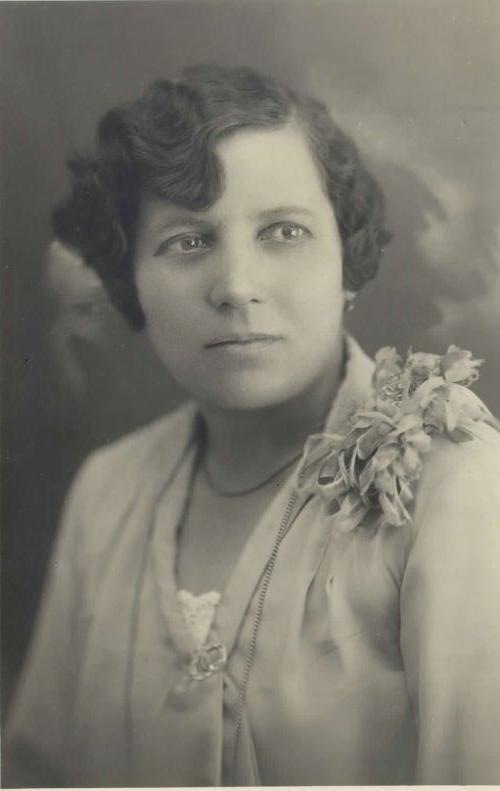
Dragica Legat Košmerl

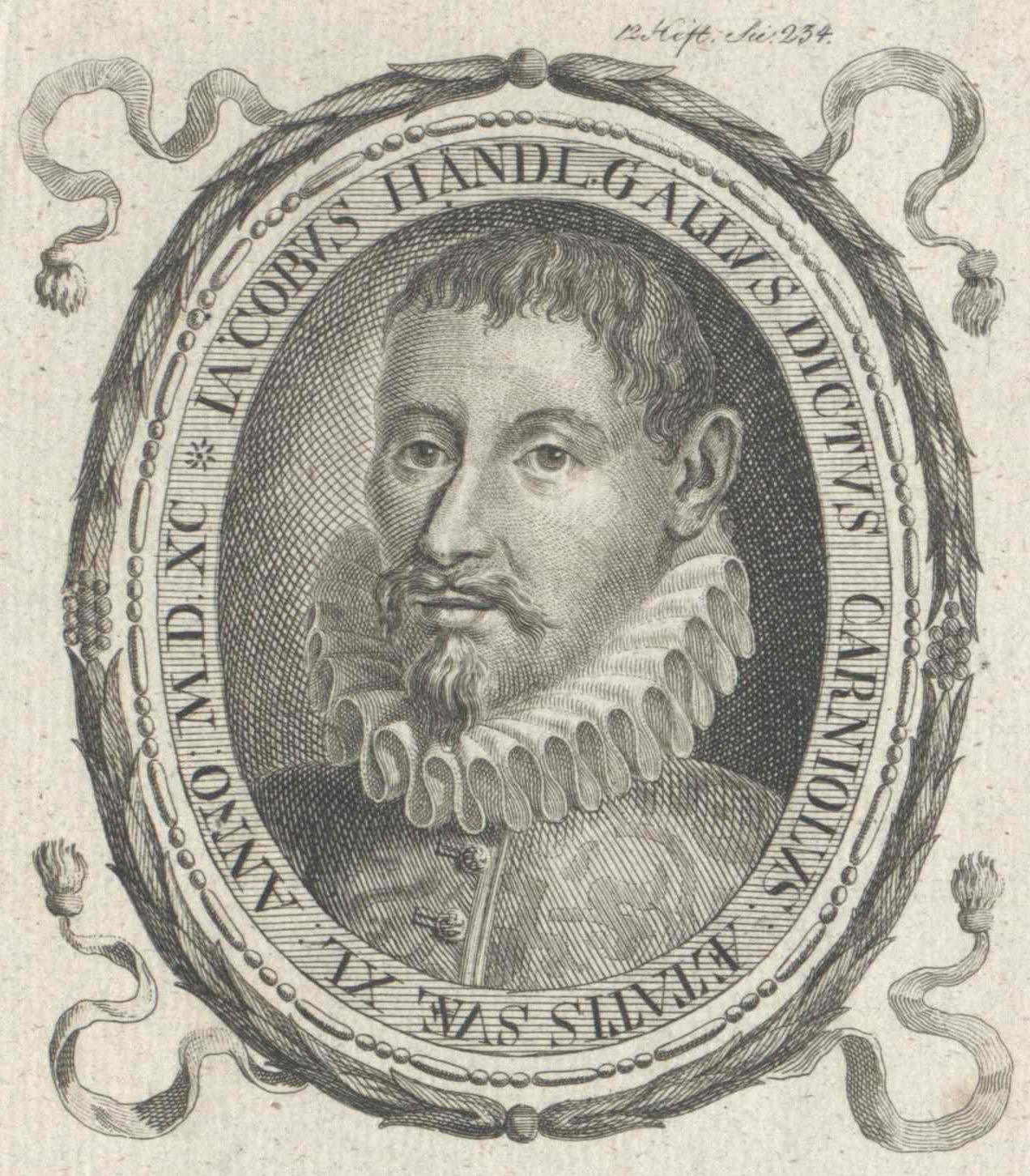
Jacobus Gallus

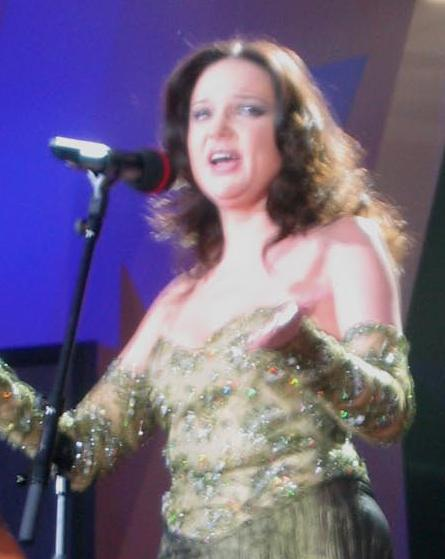
Alenka Gotar

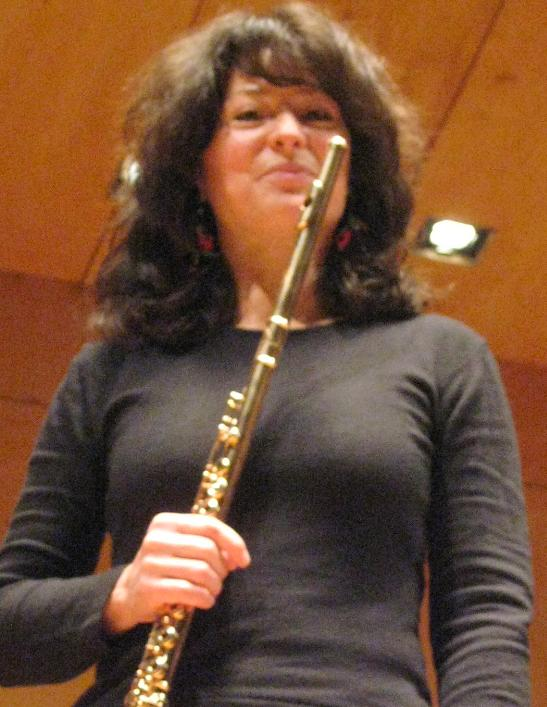
Irena Grafenauer

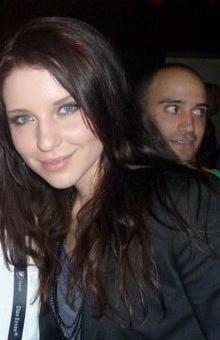
Maja Keuc

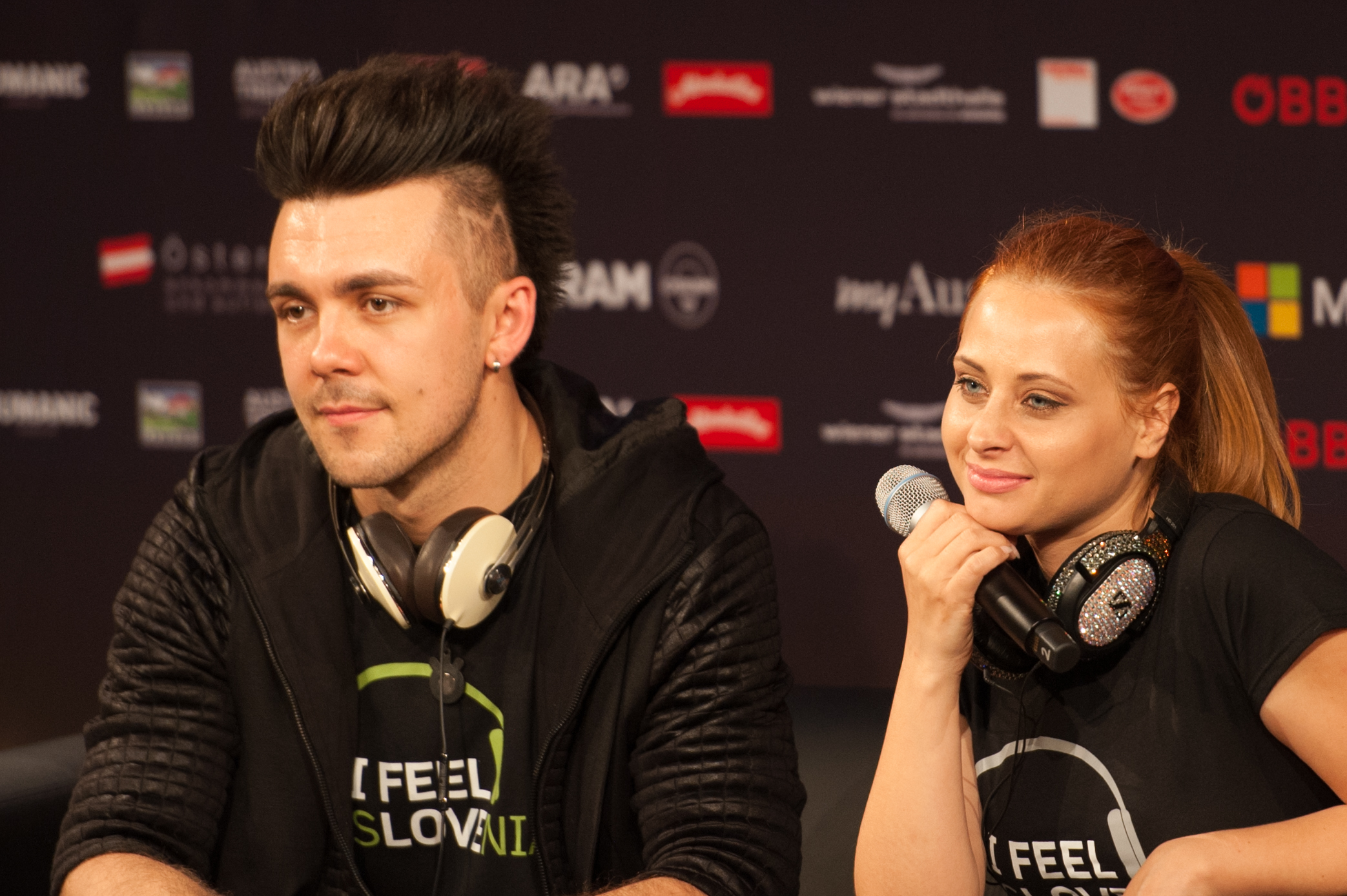
Maraaya

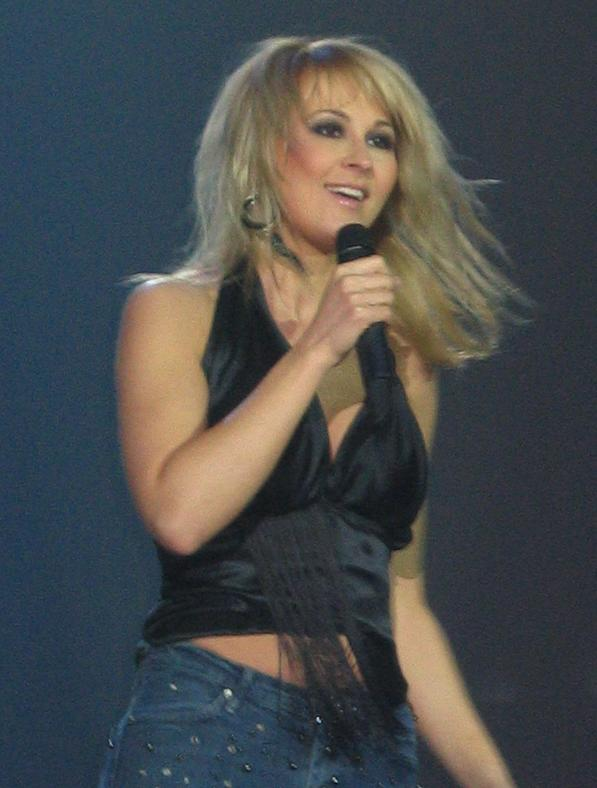
Karmen Stavec

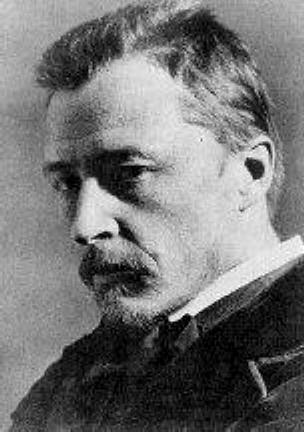
Hugo Wolf

Ana Soklič

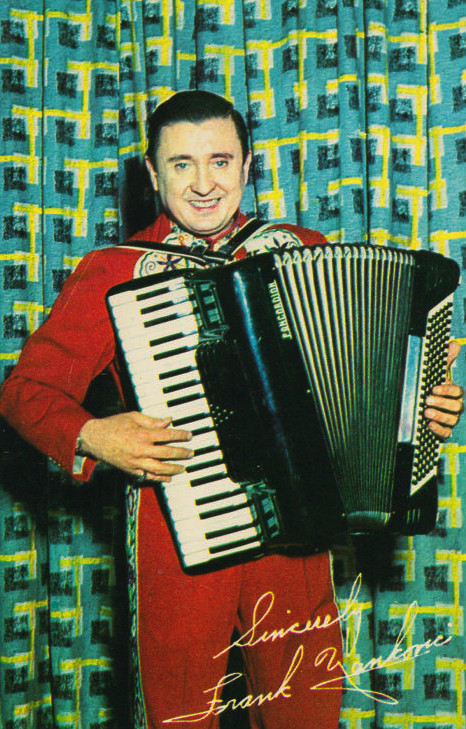
Frank Yankovic

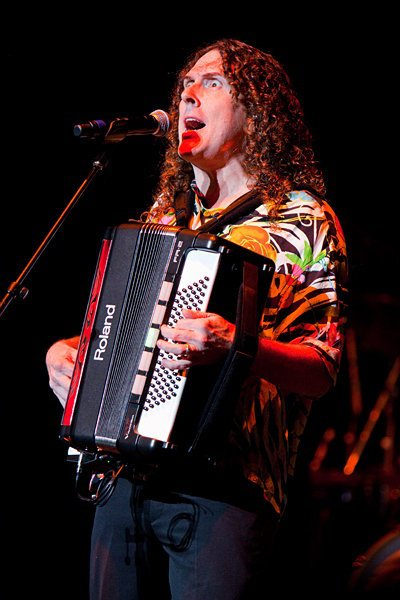
"Weird Al" Yankovic

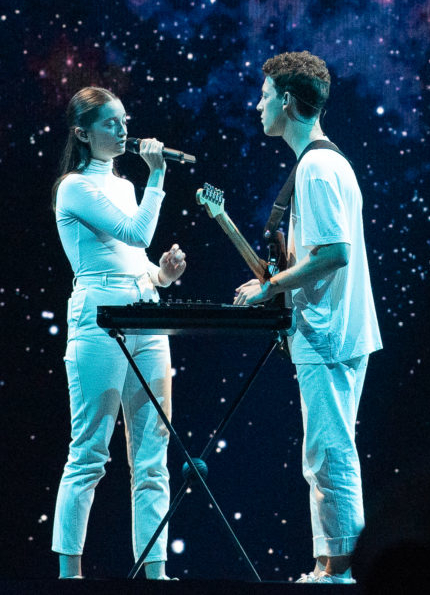
zalagasper

== Philosophers ==
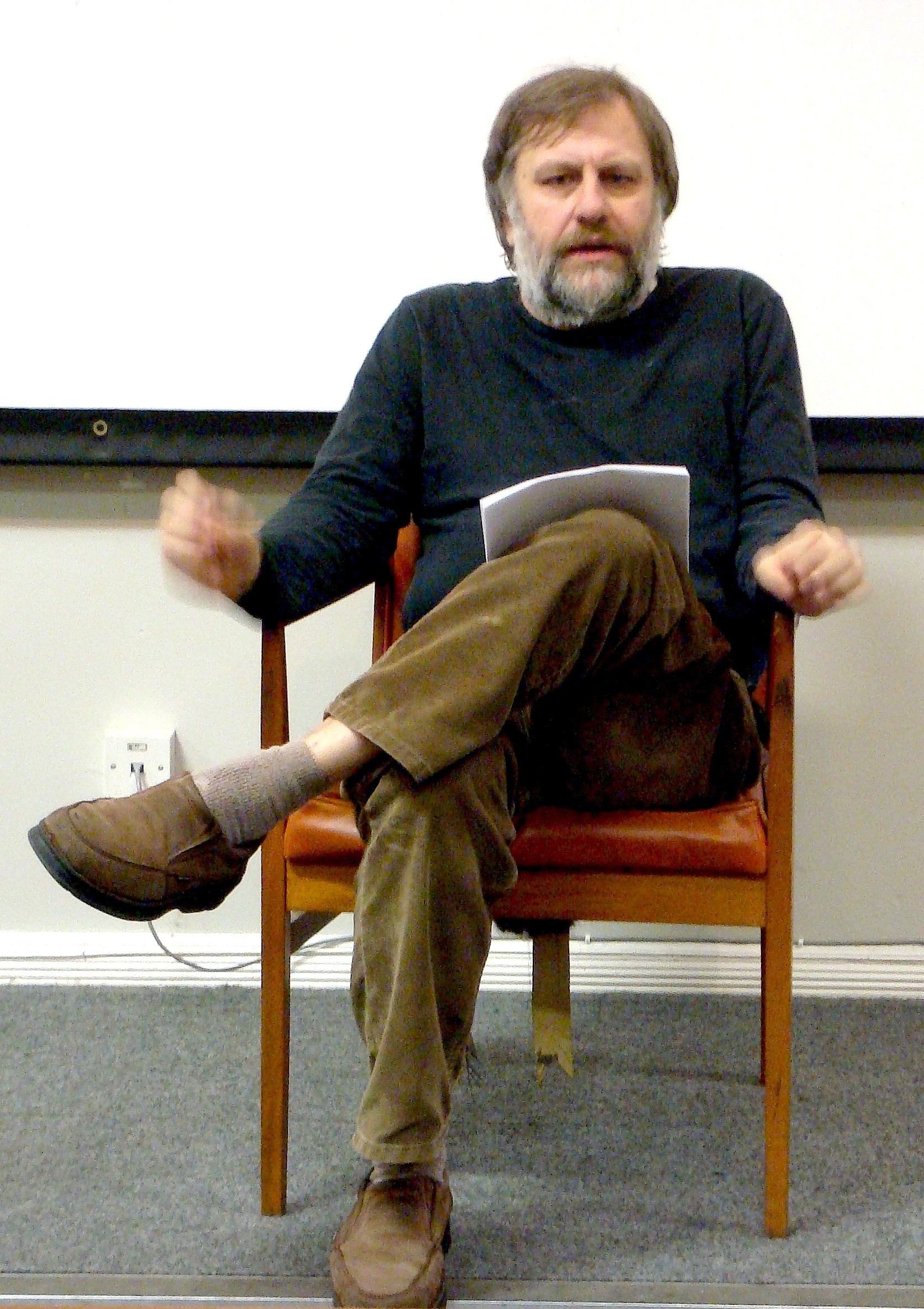
Slavoj Žižek

- Mladen Dolar (born 1951) – philosopher, cofounder of the Ljubljana school of psychoanalysis
- Herman of Carinthia (1105/1110 – after 1154) – philosopher, astronomer, astrologer, mathematician
- Tine Hribar (born 1941) – philosopher
- Milan Komar (1921–2006) – philosopher
- Josip Križan (1841–1921) – mathematician, physicist, philosopher, astronomer
- Leonid Pitamic (1885–1971) – philosopher of law
- Avguštin Stegenšek (1875–1920) – philosopher, theologian, art historian
- Anton Strle (1915–2003) – theologian
- Ivo Urbančič (1930–2016) – philosopher
- Ludwig Wittgenstein (1889–1951) – philosopher, in part of Slovenian descent
- Slavoj Žižek (born 1949) – sociologist, philosopher, and cultural critic
- Alenka Zupančič (born 1966) – philosopher and cultural critic

== Politicians ==
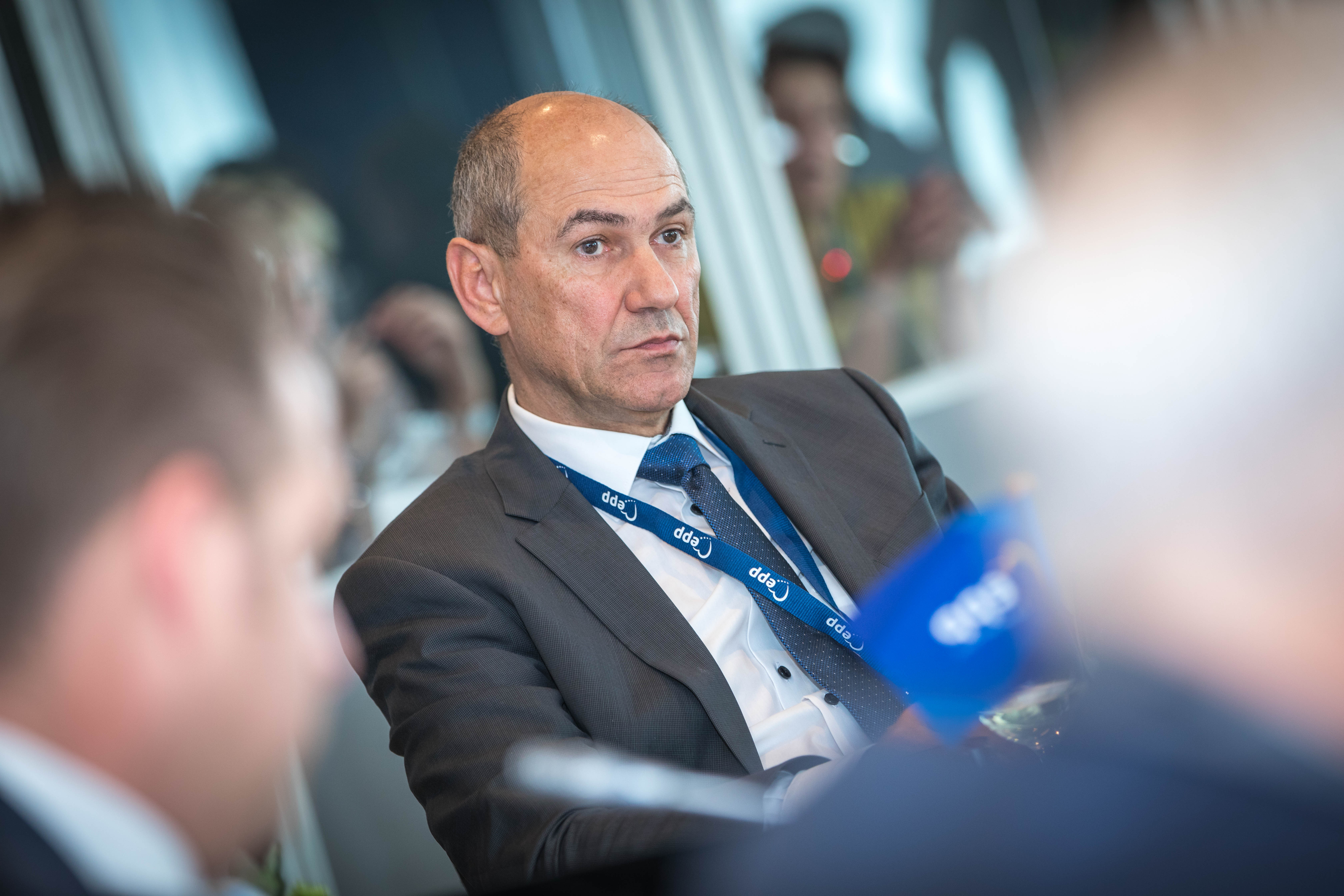
Janez Janša

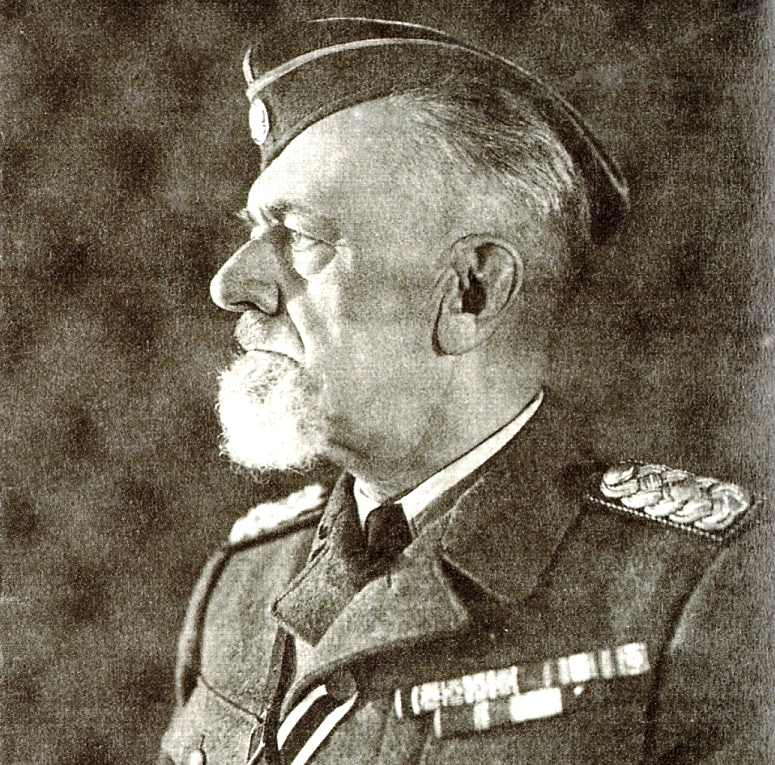
Leon Rupnik

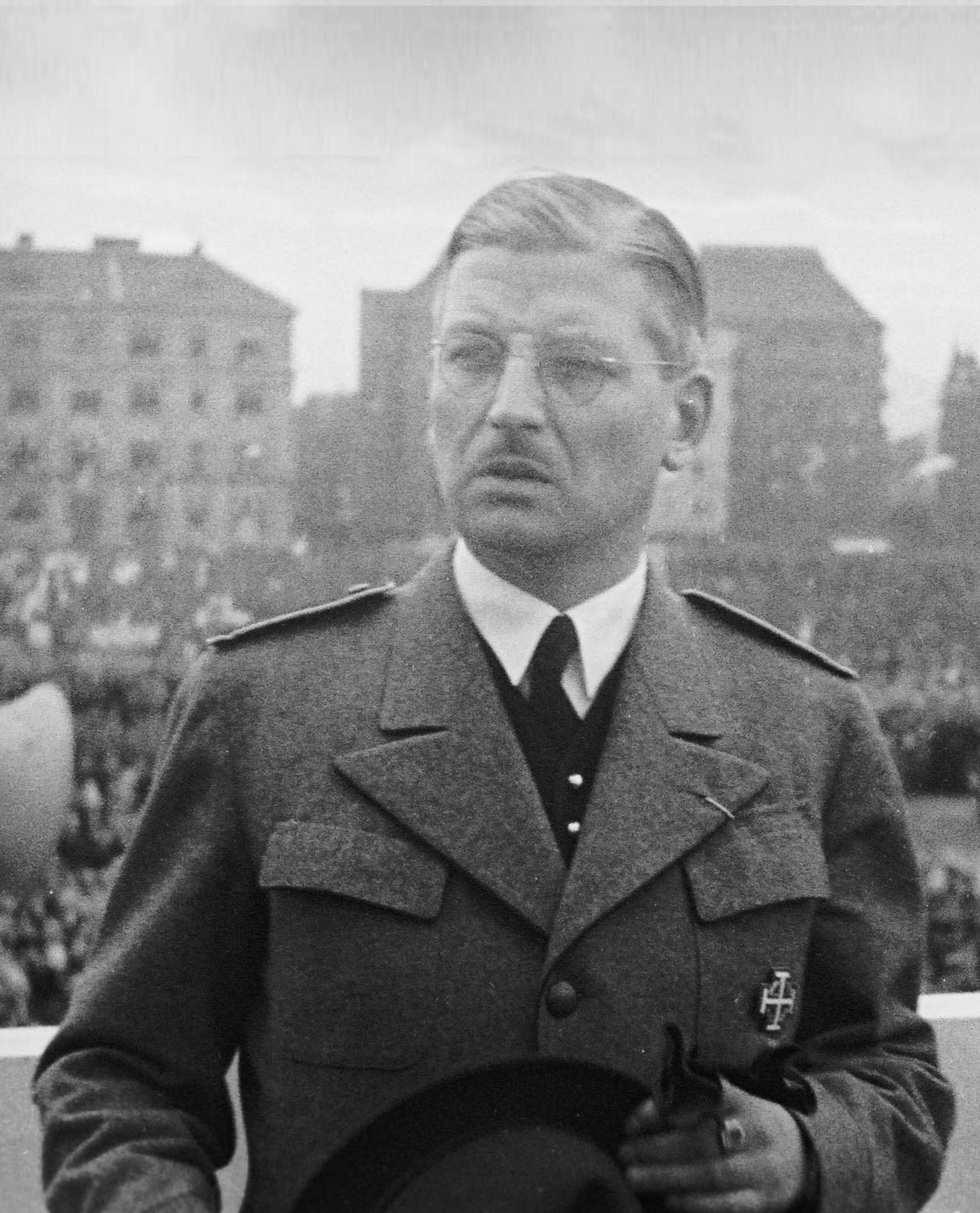
Kurt Schuschnigg

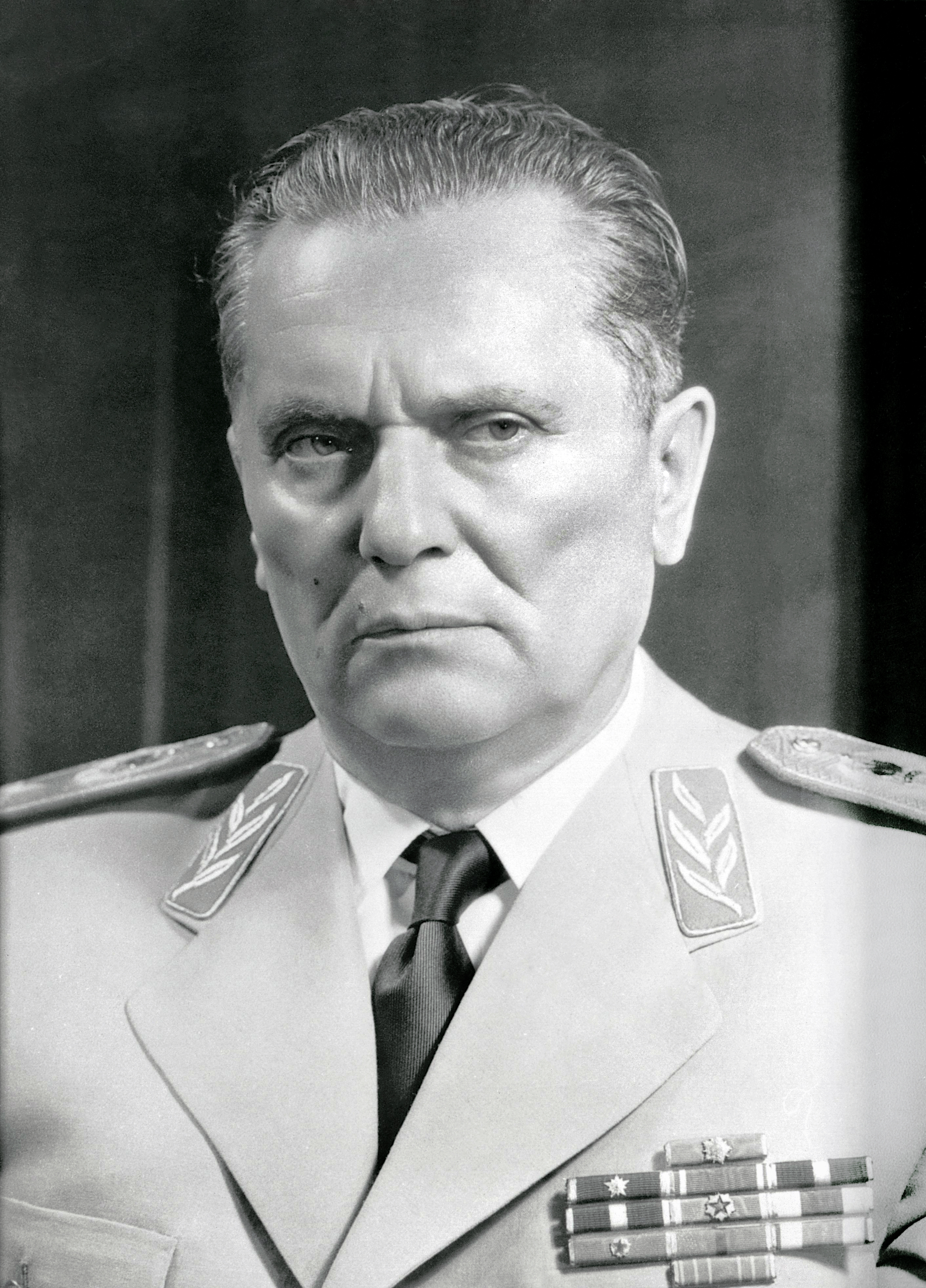
Josip Broz Tito

- Andrej Bajuk (1943–2011) – third prime minister of independent Slovenia
- John Blatnik (1911–1991) – U.S. Congressman (Slovenian parents; born and raised in the United States, and never lived in Slovenia)
- Leonard J. Bodack (1932–2015) – former Pennsylvania State Senator (Slovenian ancestry; born and raised in the United States, and never lived in Slovenia)
- Jože Brilej (1910–1981) – Yugoslav politician, diplomat and ambassador, President of the United Nations Security Council (1956)
- Josip Broz Tito (1892–1980) – president of the Socialist Federative Republic of Yugoslavia between 1945 and 1980 (son of a Slovenian mother, Marija Javeršek, and of a Croat father, Franjo Broz)
- Leo von Caprivi (1831–1899) – German major general and statesman who served as German Chancellor from March 1890 to October 1894 (His family (complete surname: von Caprivi de Caprera de Montecuccoli) was of Italian and disputed Slovenian origin; born and raised in Germany, and never lived in Slovenia)
- Janez Drnovšek (1950–2008) – second prime minister of independent Slovenia, third president of Slovenia, 2003–2008
- Robert Golob (born 1967) – Slovene prime minister
- Franc Grafenauer (1860–1935) – organ-builder, member of the Imperial Council and the State Parliament, People's Tribune of the Carinthian Slovenes
- Tom Harkin – U.S. Senator (Slovenian mother; born and raised in the United States and never lived in Slovenia)
- Janez Janša (born 1958) – fifth prime minister of independent Slovenia
- Edvard Kardelj (1910–1979) – prewar communist, politician, statesman, and journalist
- Boris Kidrič (1912–1953) – communist, politician, statesman and economist
- Amy Jean Klobuchar (born 1960) – U.S. Senator from Minnesota (Father's grandparents came from Slovenia; born and raised in United States, has never lived in Slovenia)
- Anton Korošec (1872–1940) – prominent Yugoslav politician
- Milan Kučan (born 1941) – first president of independent Slovenia, 1991–2002
- Frank Lausche (1895–1990) – former U.S. Senator, Governor of Ohio & Mayor of Cleveland (Parents of Slovenian origin; born and raised in the United States and never lived in Slovenia)
- Vladko Maček (1879–1964) – Croatian politician of Slovene origin from the first half of the 20th century. He led the Croatian Peasant Party (HSS)
- James Oberstar (1934–2014) – U.S. Representative from Minnesota (Partial Slovenian ancestry; born and raised in the United States and never lived in Slovenia)
- Lojze Peterle (born 1948) – first prime minister of independent Slovenia
- Wolfgang Petritsch (born 1947) – Austrian diplomat of Slovene ethnicity (former OHR)
- Tanya Plibersek – Australian politician – House of Representatives
- Anton Rop (born 1960) – fourth prime minister of independent Slovenia
- Gregorij Rožman (1883–1959) – Bishop of Ljubljana (1930–1945), collaborator with Italian and German occupying forces during the Second World War
- Marjan Šarec (born 1977) – Slovene prime minister
- Kurt Schuschnigg (1897–1977) – Chancellor of Austria, of Slovenian descent
- Danilo Türk (born 1952) – President elect of Slovenia
- Walter Veltroni (born 1955) – Mayor of Rome (Slovenian mother)
- George Voinovich – U.S. Senator, former Governor of Ohio and Mayor of Cleveland, (Slovenian mother; born and raised in the United States, never lived in Slovenia)
- Anton Vratuša (1915–2017) – politician and diplomat, who was the Prime Minister of Slovenia from 1978–80 and of the Socialist Federal Republic of Yugoslavia, also its ambassador to the United Nations

== Scientists and scholars ==
- Robert Blinc (1933–2011) – physicist
- Ivan Bratko (born 1946) – computer scientist
- Srečko Brodar (1893–1987) – palaeontologist
- Andrej Čadež (born 1942) – astrophysicist
- Avrelija Cencič (1964–2012) – biochemist
- Lavo Čermelj (1889–1980) – physicist
- Bojan Čop (1923–1994) – linguist
- Dragotin Cvetko (1911–1993) – musicologist
- Davorin Dolar (1921–2005) – chemist
- Josip Globevnik (born 1945) – mathematician
- Bogo Grafenauer (1916–1995) – historian
- Ivan Grafenauer (1880–1964) – literary historian and ethnologist
- Stanko Grafenauer (1922–2010) – mineralogist
- Pavel Grošelj (1883–1940) – biologist and belletrist
- Jovan Hadži (1884–1972) – biologist
- Anton Janežič (1828–1869) – Slavic specialist and grammarian
- Jernej Kopitar (1780–1844) – philologist
- Peter Kosler (1824–1879) – lawyer, geographer, cartographer, politician, and manufacturer
- Ivo Lah (1896–1979) – mathematician
- Tine Logar (1916–2002) – philologist and dialectologist
- Thomas Luckmann (1927–2016) – sociologist
- Anton Melik (1890–1966) – geographer
- Franz Miklosich (1813–1891) – philologist
- Avgust Pavel (1886–1946) – ethnologist
- Anton Peterlin (1908–1993) – physicist
- Josip Plemelj (1873–1967) – mathematician
- Herman Potočnik (a.k.a. Noordung, 1892–1929) – pioneer of astronautics and cosmonautics, and rocket engineer
- Fritz Pregl (1869–1930) – chemist, Nobel Prize in Chemistry 1923
- Janko Prunk (born 1942) – historian
- Fran Ramovš (1890–1952) – philologist and dialectologist
- Zoran Rant (1904–1972) – mechanical engineer
- Simon Rutar (1851–1903) – historian, geographer, archaeologist and geologist
- Ljubo Sirc (1920–2016) – economist
- Boris Sket (born 1936) – zoologist
- Branko Stanovnik (born 1938) – chemist
- Jožef Stefan (1835–1893) – physicist and mathematician
- Janez Strnad (1934–2015) – physicist and populariser of natural science
- Marija Šuštar (1905–1989) – ethnochoreologist and folklorist.
- Jože Toporišič (1926–2014) – philologist
- Denis Trček (born 1963) – computer scientist
- Anton Trstenjak (1906–1996) – psychologist and theologian
- Johann Weikhard von Valvasor (1641–1693) – nobleman and polymath
- Jurij Bartolomej Vega (1754–1802) – mathematician, physicist and artillery officer
- Ivan Vidav (1918–2015) – mathematician
- Milan Vidmar (1885–1962) – electrical engineer, chess player, and chess theorist
- Valentin Vodnik (1758–1819) – poet, journalist, philologist
- Egon Zakrajšek (1941–2002) – mathematician and computer scientist
- Miroslav Zei (1914–2006) – marine biologist
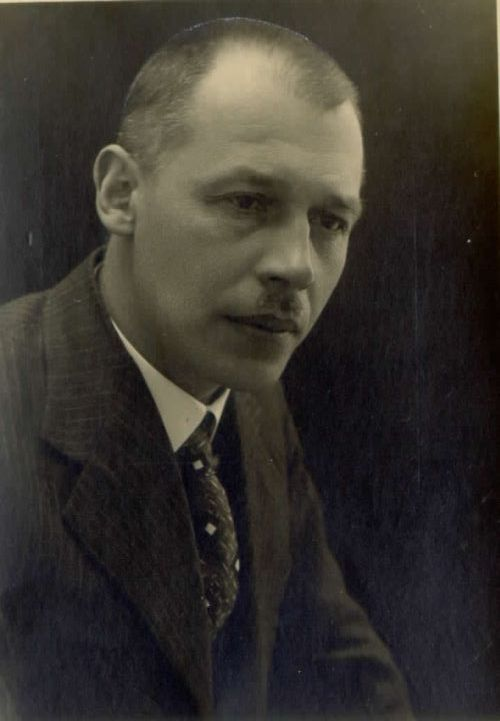
Srečko Brodar

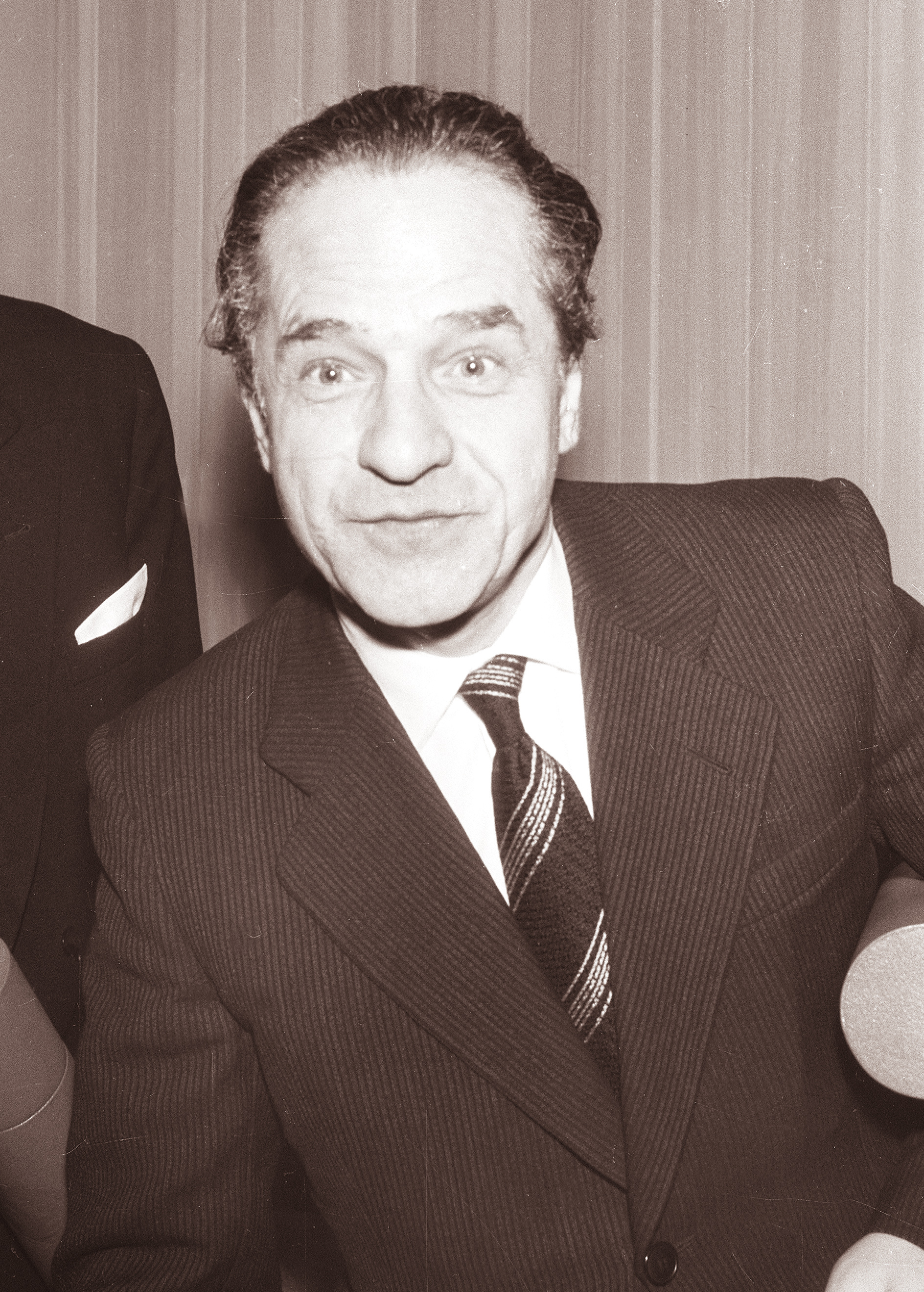
Dragotin Cvetko

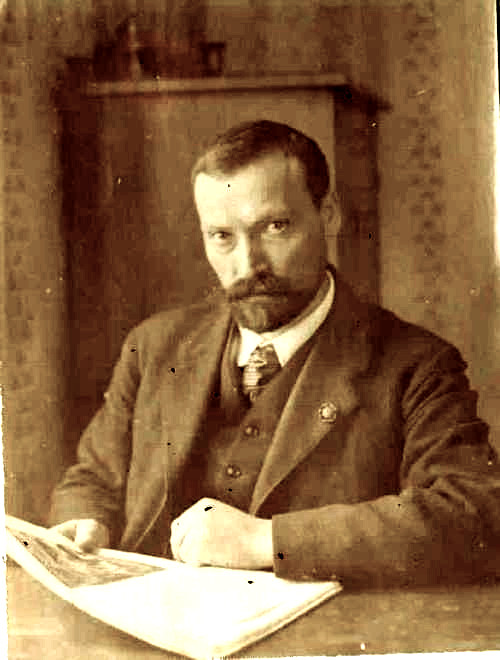
Ivan Grafenauer in the 1920s

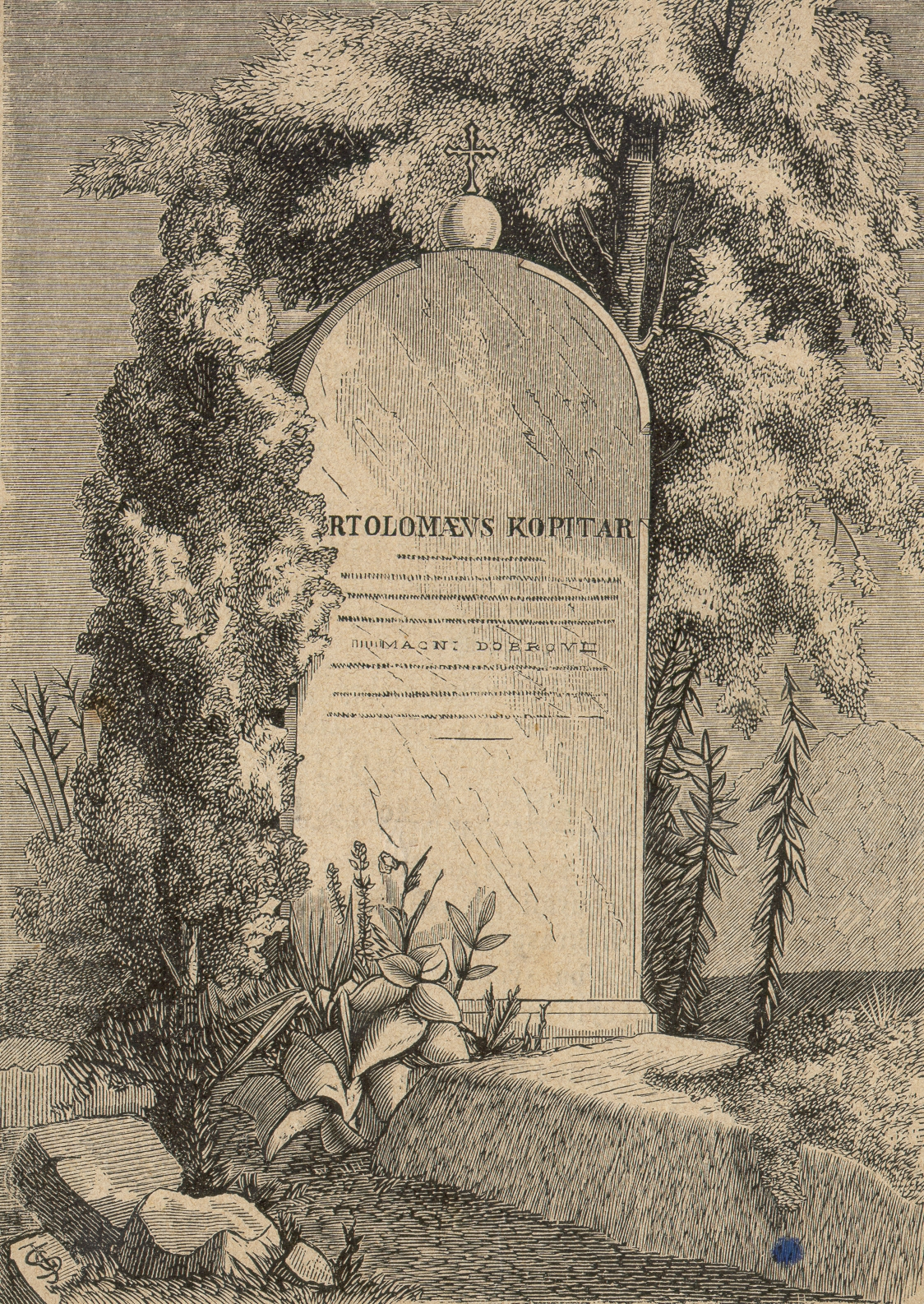
Jernej Kopitar

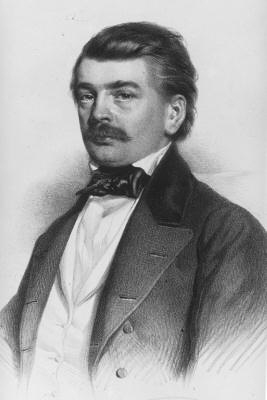
Franz Miklosich

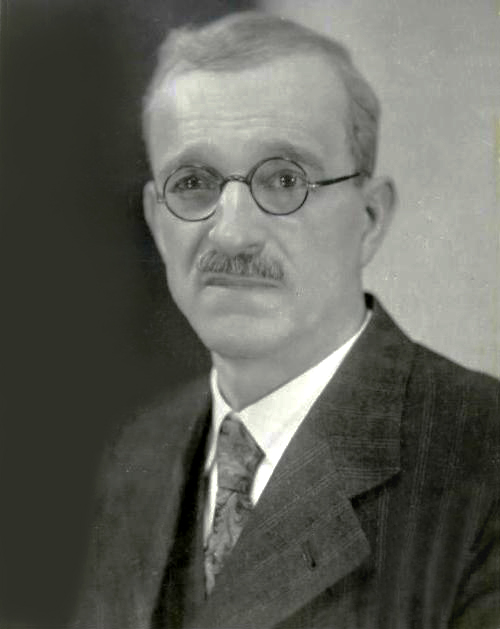
Josip Plemelj

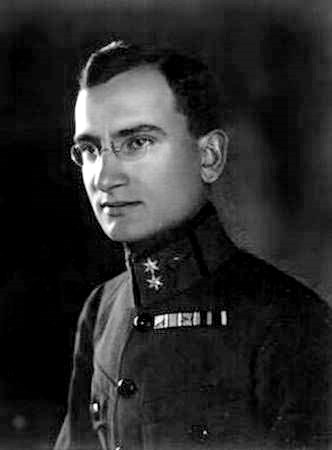
Herman Potočnik

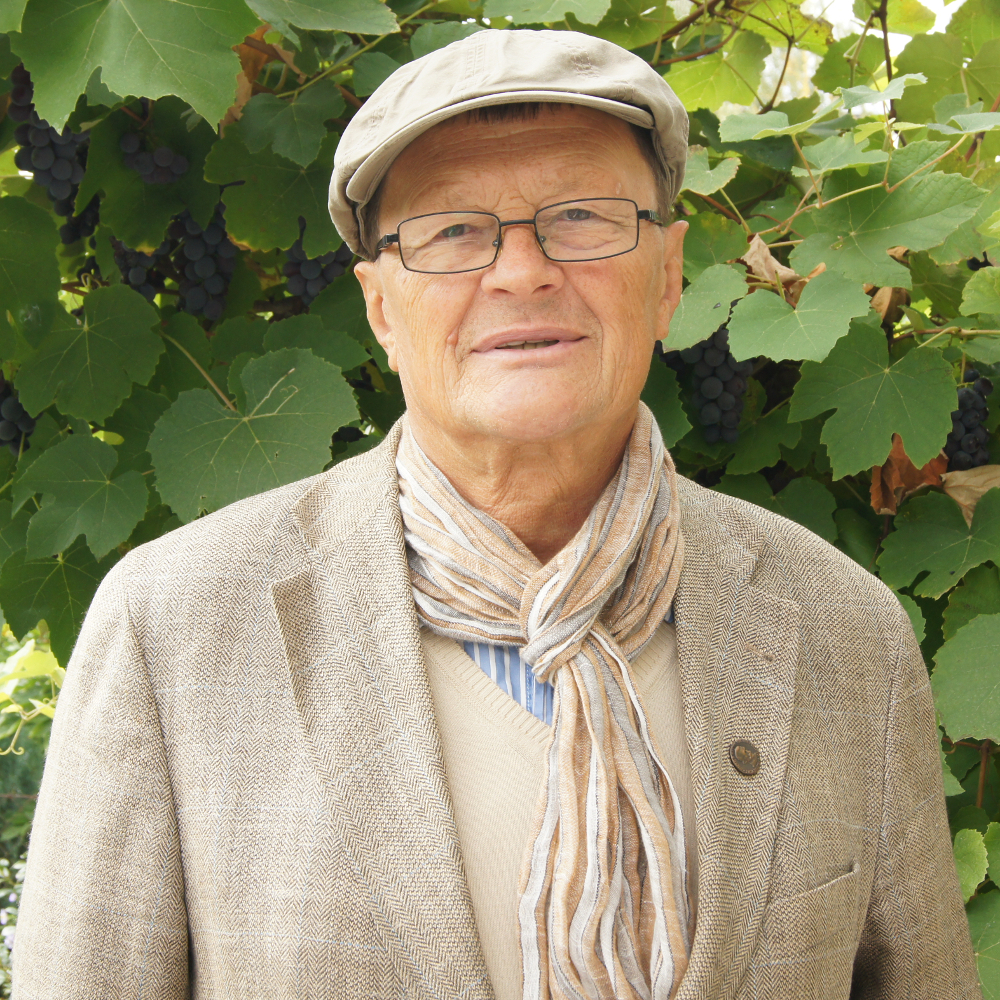
Janko Prunk

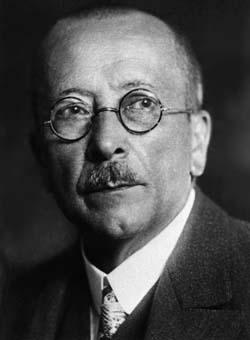
Fritz Pregl

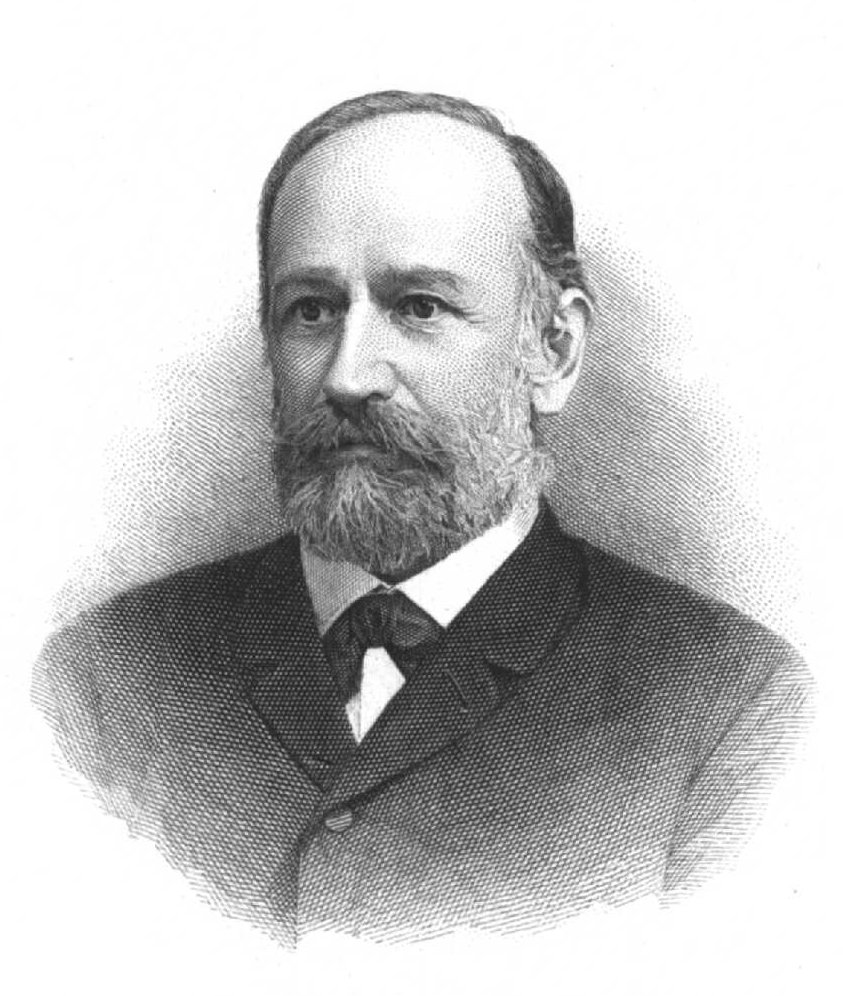
Josef Stefan

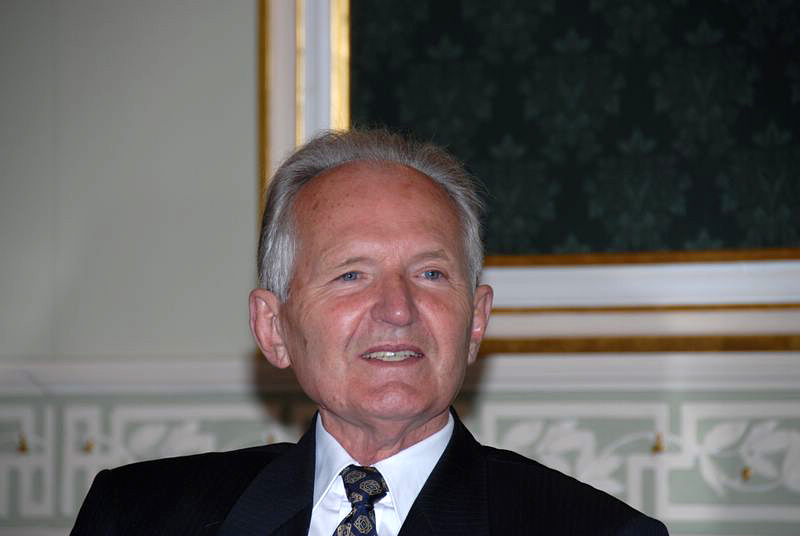
Jože Toporišič

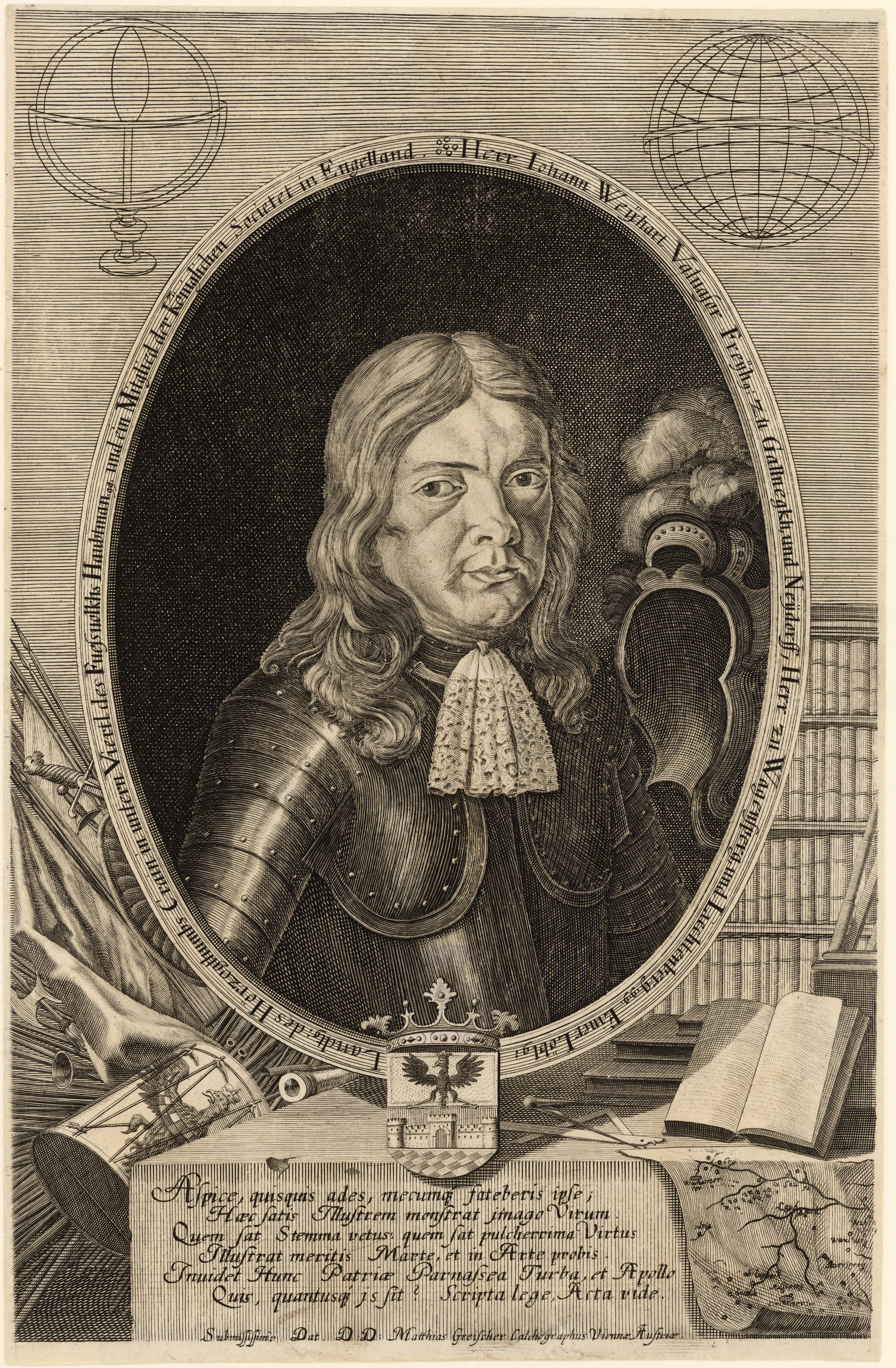
Valvasor

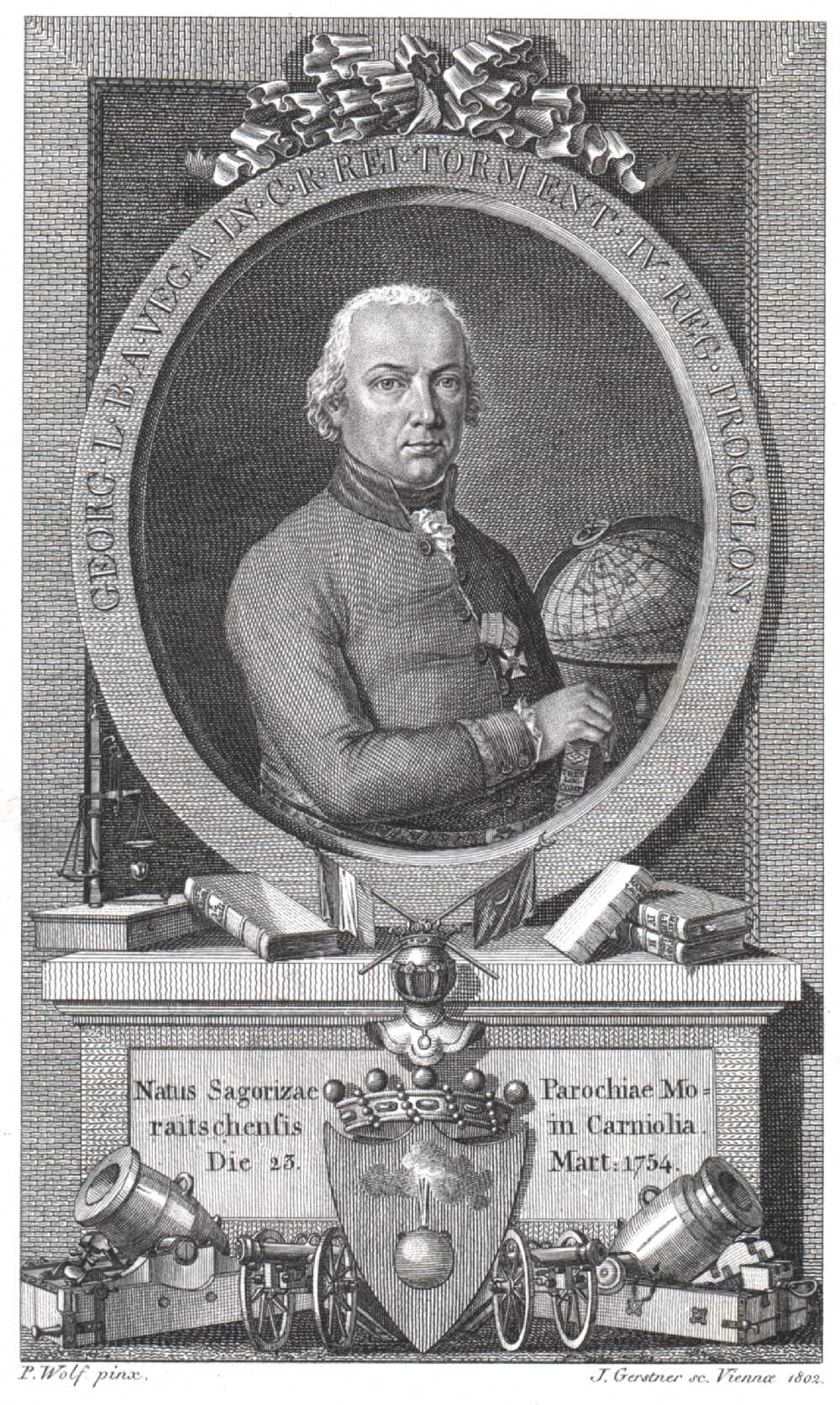
Jurij Vega

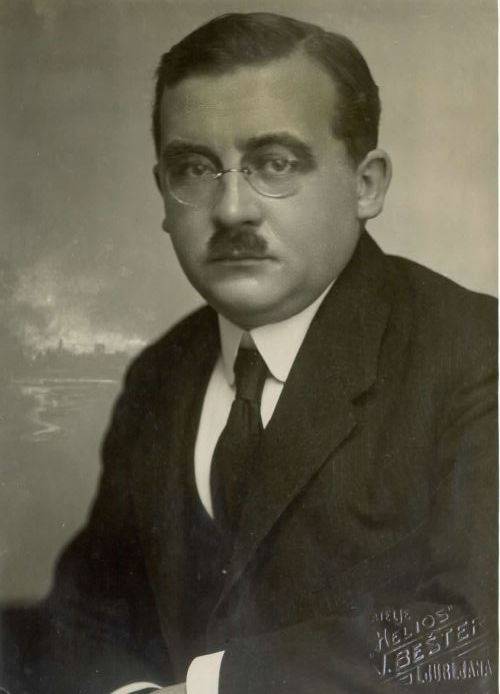
Milan Vidmar

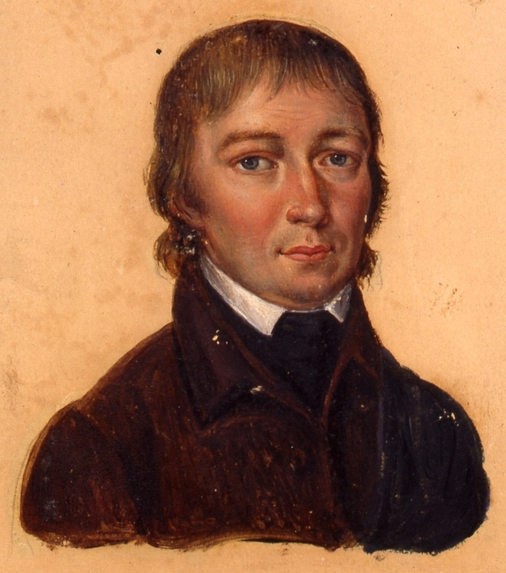
Valentin Vodnik

== Athletes ==
- Vili Ameršek – football player
- Alenka Bikar – sprinter, Olympic athlete
- Valter Birsa (born 1986) – footballer
- Jaka Blažič (born 1990) – basketball player
- Fredi Bobic (born 1971) – footballer of Slovenian descent
- Vinko Bogataj – ski jumper, featured in the Wide World of Sports Agony of Defeat video
- Nataša Bokal (born 1967) – skier
- Borut Božič – cyclist
- Janez Brajkovič – cyclist
- Primož Brezec (born 1979) – basketball player (NBA)
- Brigita Brezovac (born 1979) – IFBB professional bodybuilder
- Brigita Bukovec (born 1970) – athlete, Olympic athlete
- Anja Čarman – swimmer
- Jolanda Čeplak (born 1976) – Olympic athlete
- Miroslav Cerar (born 1939) – gymnast, Olympic athlete
- Iztok Čop (born 1972) – rower, Olympic athlete
- Alenka Cuderman (born 1961) – handball player, Olympic athlete
- Rudolf Cvetko (1880–1977) – fencer, Olympic athlete
- Ivo Daneu – basketball player
- Matjaž Debelak (born 1965) – ski jumper, Olympic athlete
- Rajmond Debevec (born 1963) – shooter, Olympic athlete
- David Dedek – basketball coach
- Luka Dončić – basketball player, No. 3 overall pick in the 2018 NBA draft, NBA player for the Los Angeles Lakers
- Polona Dornik – basketball player, Olympic athlete
- Alenka Dovžan – alpine skier, Olympic athlete
- Goran Dragić – basketball player (NBA), Serbian father and Slovene mother
- Zoran Dragić – basketball player (NBA), Serbian father and Slovene mother
- Ana Drev (born 1985) – alpine skier
- Vital Eiselt (born 1941) – basketball player
- Vesna Fabjan – cross-country skier
- Saša Farič – freestyle skier
- Maruša Ferk – alpine skier
- Jure Franko – alpine skier, Olympic athlete
- Damjan Fras – ski jumper, Olympic athlete
- Tim Gajser (born 1996) – motocross racer (MXGP)
- Janja Garnbret (born 1999) – rock climber
- Samir Handanovic (born 1984) – goalkeeper and football trainer
- Meta Hrovat (born 1998) – alpine skier
- Urška Hrovat – alpine skier, Olympic athlete
- Sait Idrizi (born 1990) – football player
- Sara Isaković (born 1988) – swimmer
- Milan Janša (born 1965) – rower
- Mima Jaušovec (born 1956) – female tennis player
- Simon Jecl (born 1986) – freestyle skier
- Andrej Jerman – alpine skier
- Marjan Kandus (born 1932) – basketball player
- Davo Karničar (born 1962) – alpine and extreme skier
- Srečko Katanec (born 1963) – football player and selector, Olympic athlete
- Peter Kauzer (born 1983) – slalom canoeist, Olympic athlete
- Jani Klemenčič (born 1971) – rower
- Anže Kopitar – NHL hockey player, Olympic athlete
- Jure Košir – alpine skier, Olympic athlete
- Žan Košir – snowboarder
- Katja Koren – alpine skier, Olympic athlete
- Primož Kozmus – hammer thrower, Olympic athlete
- Robert Kranjec – alpine ski jumper
- Žan Kranjec – alpine skier
- Rene Krhin (born 1990) – football player
- Bojan Križaj (born 1957) – alpine skier, Olympic athlete
- Miha Lokar (born 1935) – basketball player
- Petra Majdič – cross country skier, Olympic athlete
- Andreja Mali (born 1977) – biathlete
- Tina Maze – alpine skier
- Ariel McDonald – basketball player
- Miha Mevlja – football player
- Marko Milič – basketball player
- Sašo Mirjanič (1968–1994) – rower
- Matej Mohorič – cyclist
- Jan Muršak - ice hockey player
- Radoslav Nesterovič – basketball player (NBA)
- Bogdan Norčič – alpine ski jumper
- Branko Oblak (born 1947) – football player
- Jan Oblak – football player
- Bruno Parma (born 1941) – chess player
- Franci Petek – ski jumper, Olympic athlete
- Nika Prevc (born 2005) – ski jumper female olympic athlete
- Primož Peterka (born 1979) – ski jumper, Olympic athlete
- Borut Petrič (born 1961) – swimmer
- Darjan Petrič (born 1964) – swimmer
- Rok Petrovič (1966–1993) – alpine skier
- Vasja Pirc (1907–1980) – chess player
- Tadej Pogačar – cyclist
- Lucija Polavder (born 1984) – judoka, Olympic athlete
- Klemen Prepelič (born 1992) – basketball player
- Špela Pretnar – alpine skier
- Peter Prevc (born 1992) – ski jumper
- Josip Primožič (1900–1985) – gymnast, Olympic athlete
- Iztok Puc – handball player
- Jure Robič (1965–2010) – marathon cyclist
- Primož Roglič – cyclist
- Mladen Rudonja – football player
- Benjamin Savšek – slalom canoeist, Olympic athlete
- Ante Šimundža – football coach
- Damir Skomina – football referee
- Uroš Slokar – basketball player (NBA)
- Luka Špik (born 1979) – rower, Olympic athlete
- Andraž Šporar (born 1994) – football player
- Katarina Srebotnik – tennis player
- Elvis Stojko – figure skater
- Boris Strel – alpine skier, Olympic athlete
- Martin Strel (born 1954) – ultra marathon swimmer
- Ilka Štuhec (born 1990) – alpine skier
- Leon Štukelj (1898–1999) – gymnast, Olympic athlete
- Mateja Svet (born 1968) – alpine skier, Olympic athlete
- Miran Tepeš – ski jumper, Olympic athlete
- Tina Trstenjak – judoka, Olympic athlete
- Beno Udrih – basketball player (NBA)
- Primož Ulaga – ski jumper, Olympic athlete
- Andrej Urlep – basketball coach
- Tadej Valjavec – cyclist
- Andraž Vehovar – slalom canoeist, Olympic athlete
- Anamari Velenšek – judoka
- Benjamin Verbič – football player
- Peter Vilfan – basketball player
- Slavko Vinčić – football referee
- Sasha Vujačić – basketball player (NBA), Serbian father and Slovene mother
- Zlatko Zahovič (born 1971) – football player
- Miha Zajc (born 1994) – football player
- Vasilij Žbogar (born 1975) – sailor, Olympic athlete
- Jure Zdovc – basketball player, Olympic athlete
- Tamara Zidanšek – tennis player
- Urška Žolnir (born 1981) – judoka, Olympic athlete
- Peter Žonta – alpine ski jumper
- Aljoša Žorga – basketball player
- Matjaž Zupan – alpine ski jumper, Olympic athlete
- Denis Žvegelj – rower, Olympic athlete
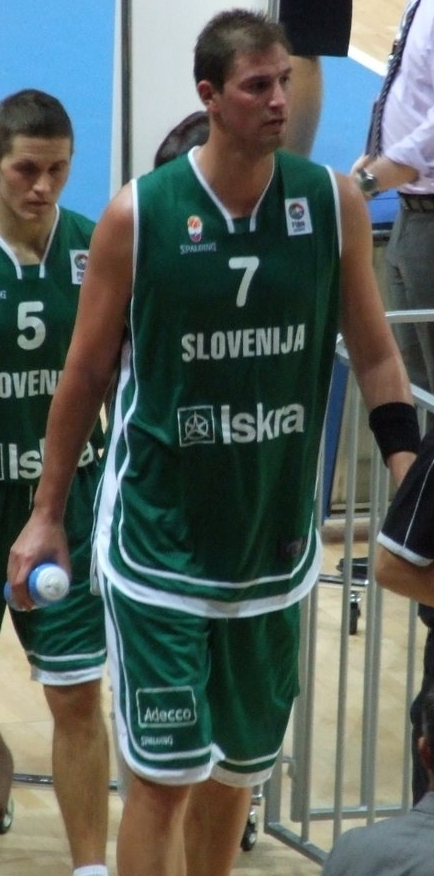
Primož Brezec

Brigita Bukovec

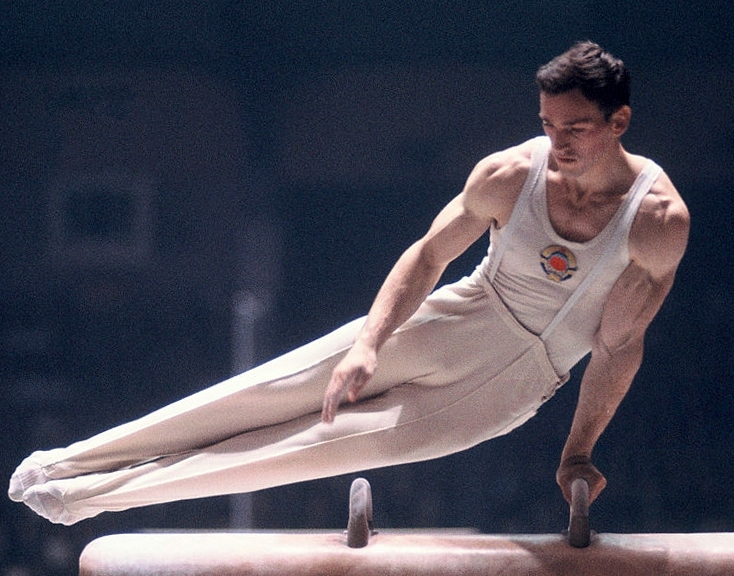
Miroslav Cerar

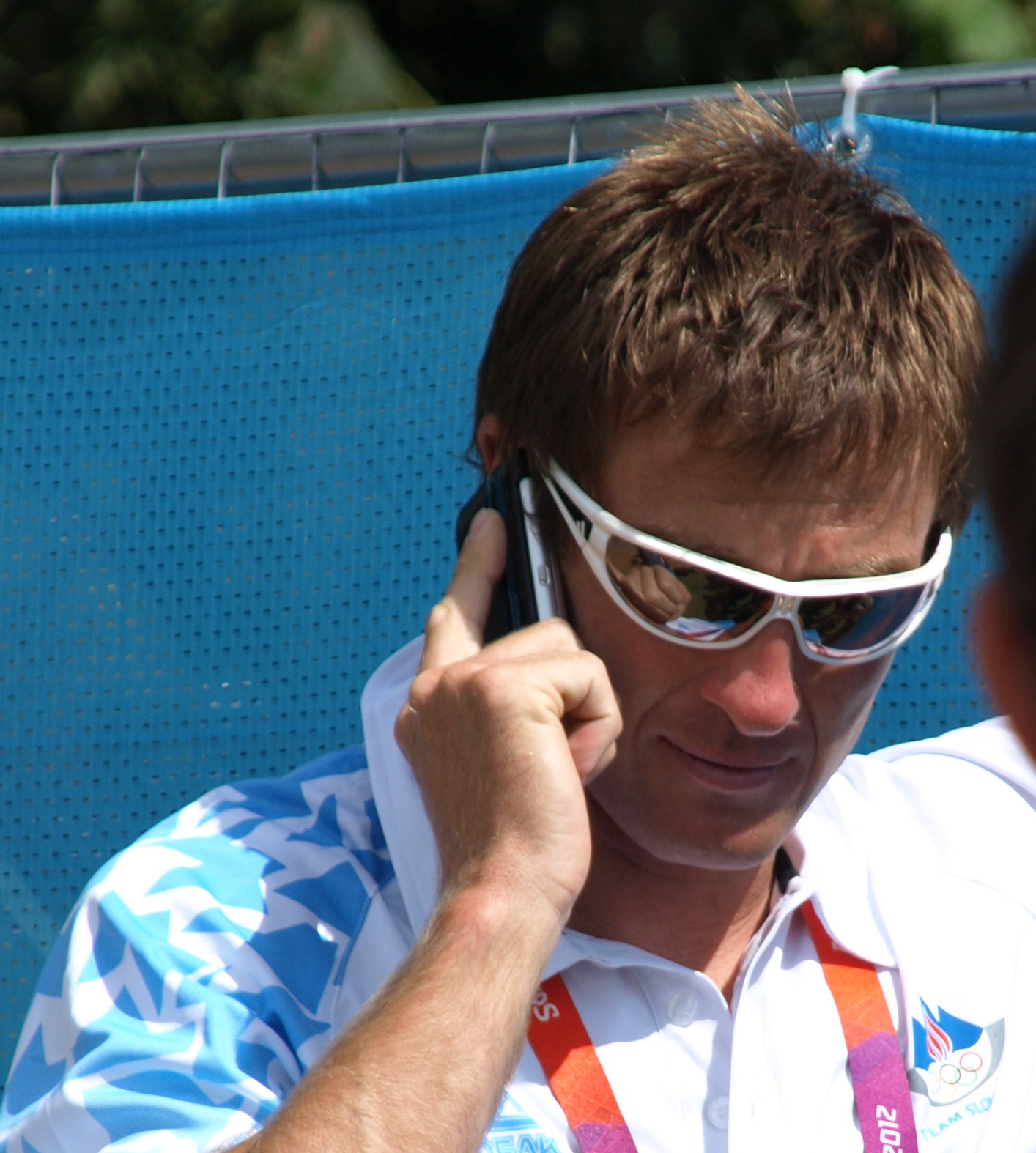
Iztok Čop

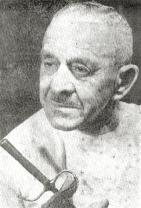
Rudolf Cvetko

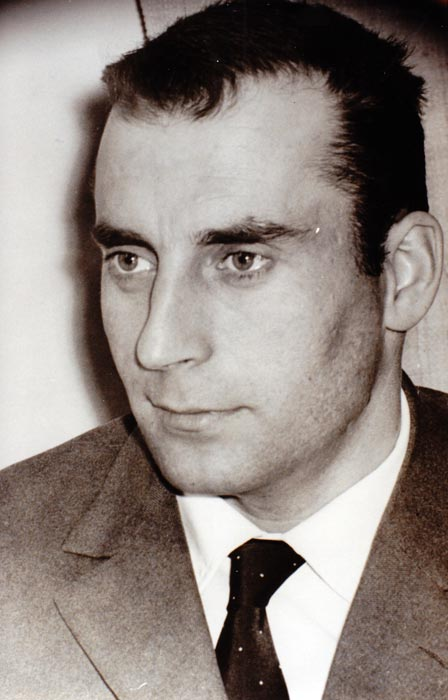
Ivo Daneu

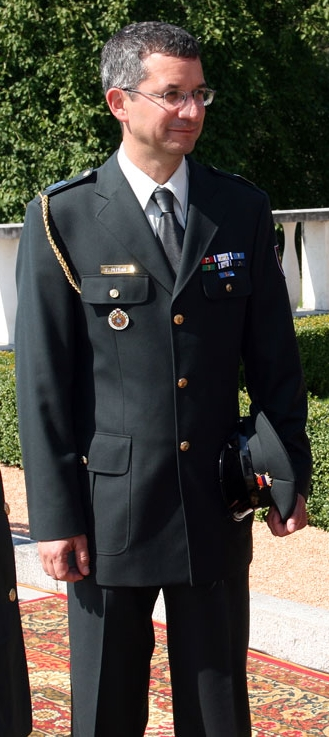
Rajmond Debevec

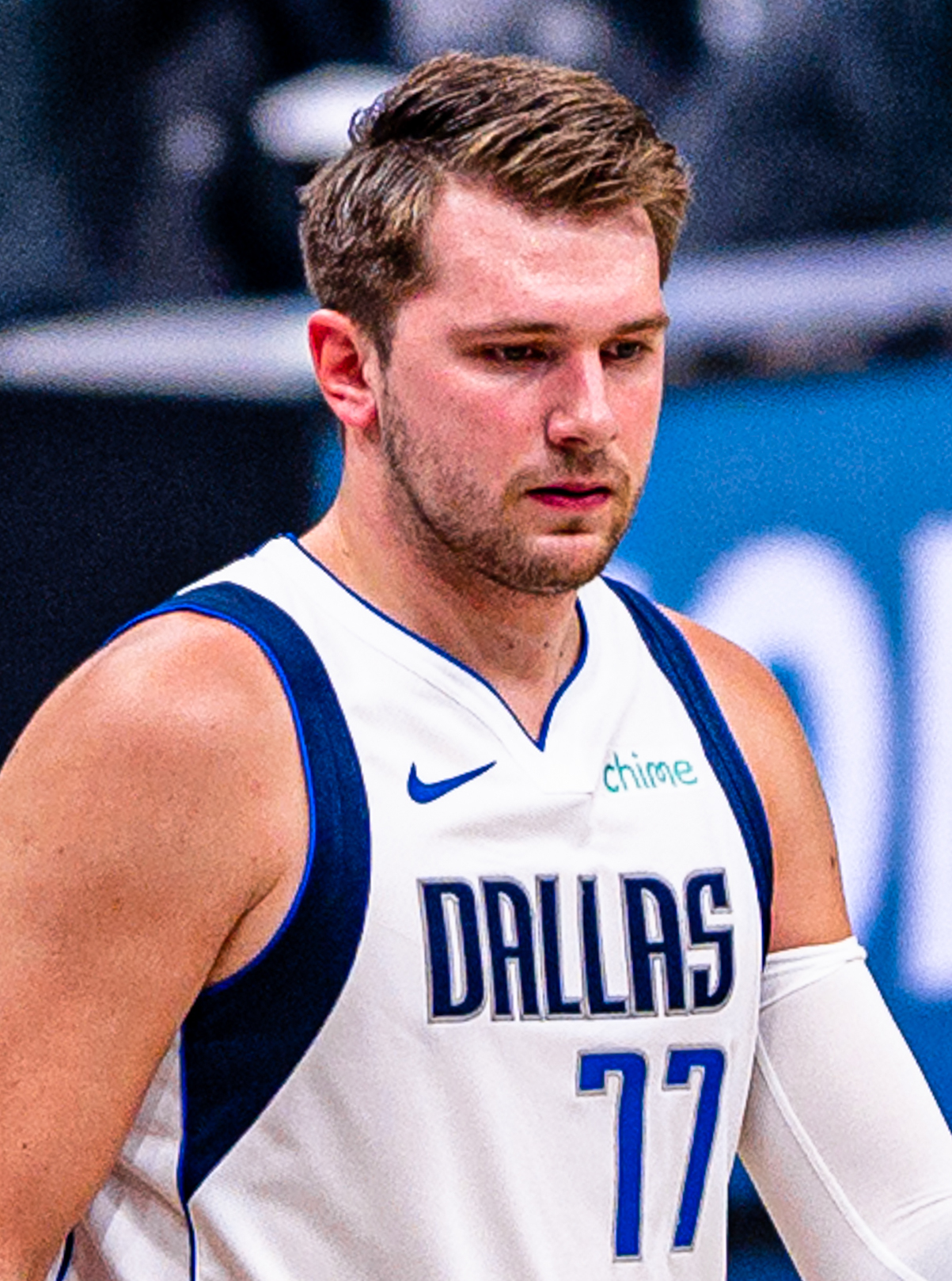
Luka Dončić

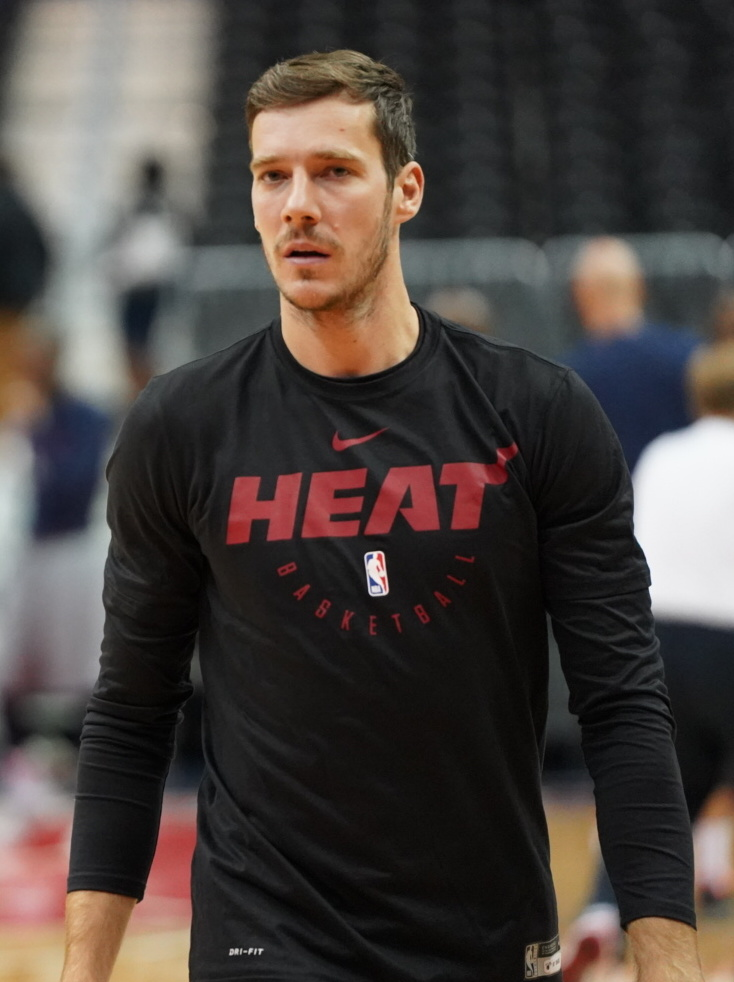
Goran Dragić

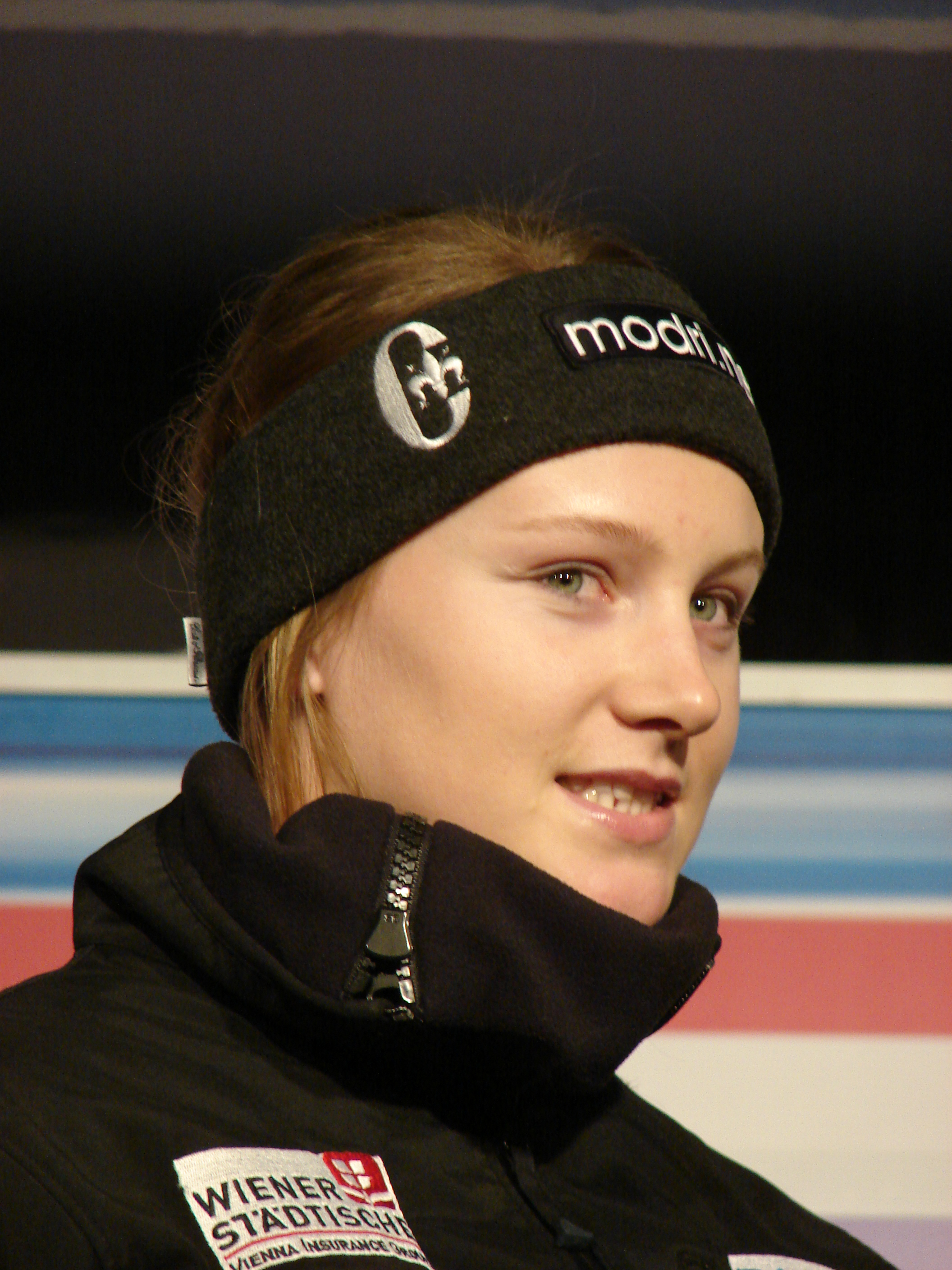
Ana Drev

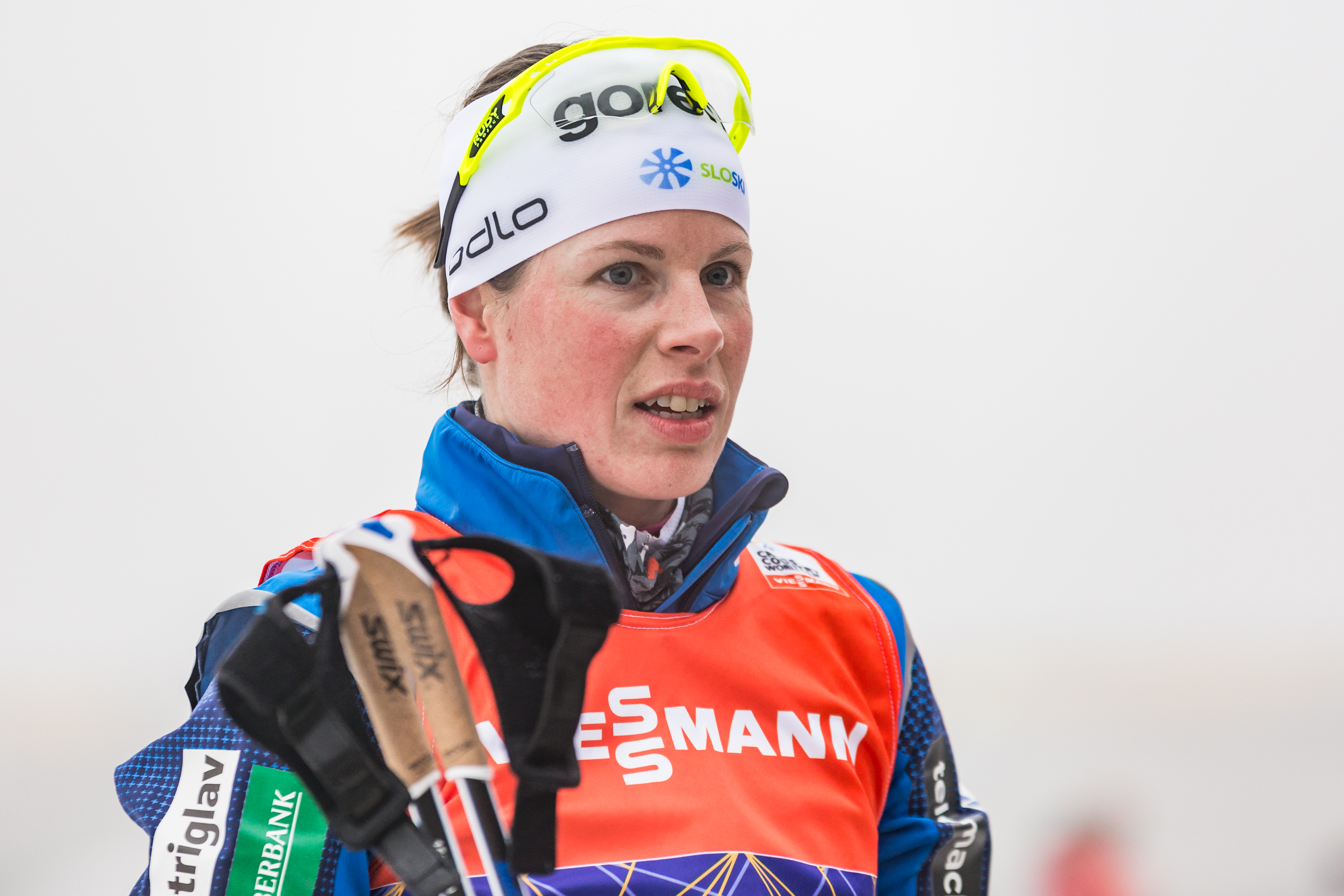
Vesna Fabjan

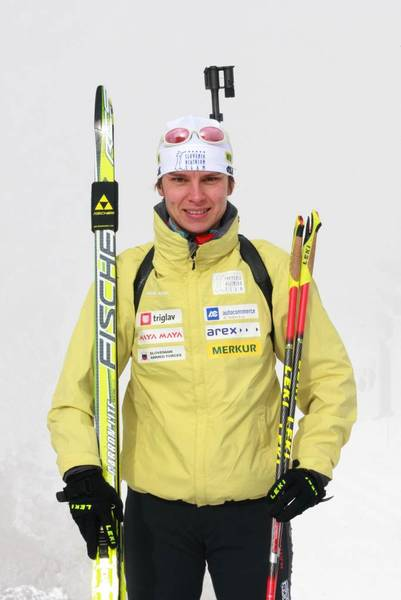
Teja Gregorin

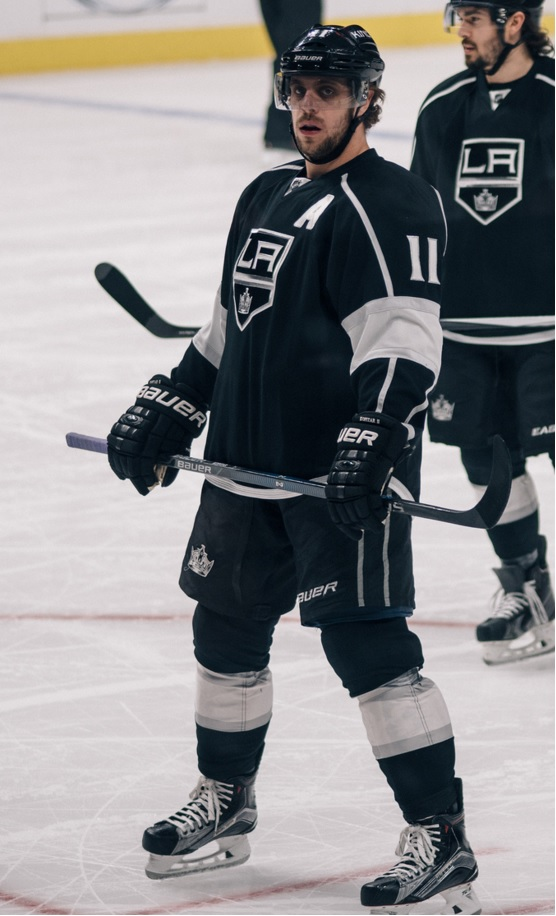
Anže Kopitar

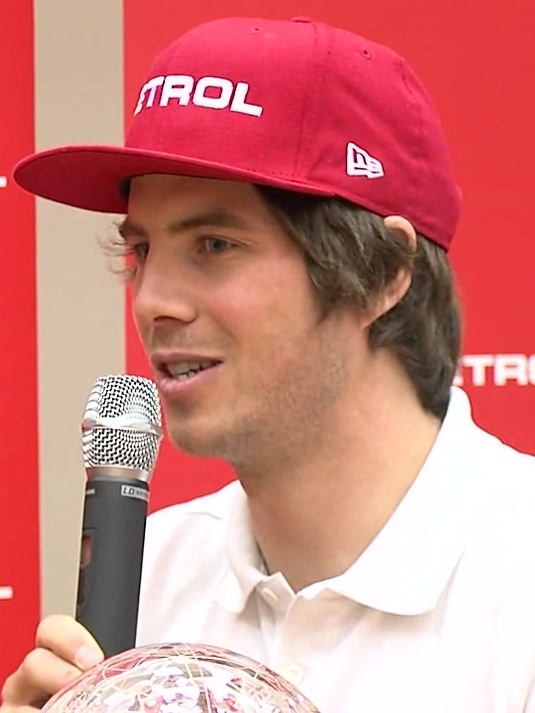
Žan Košir

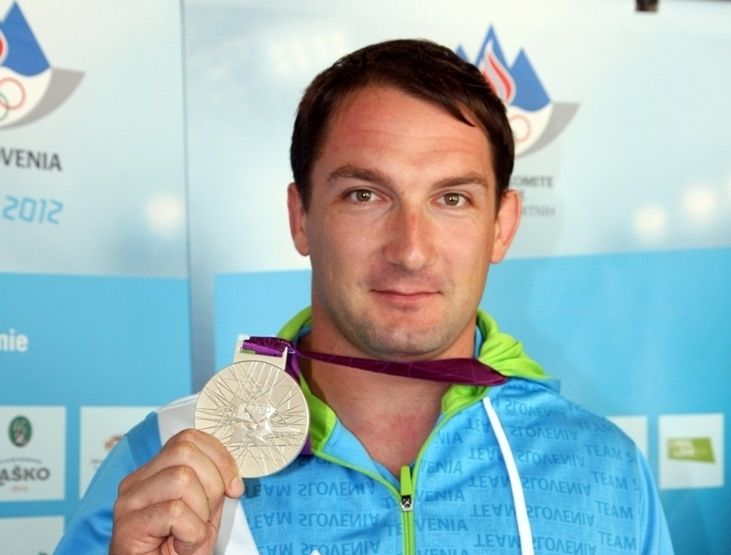
Primož Kozmus

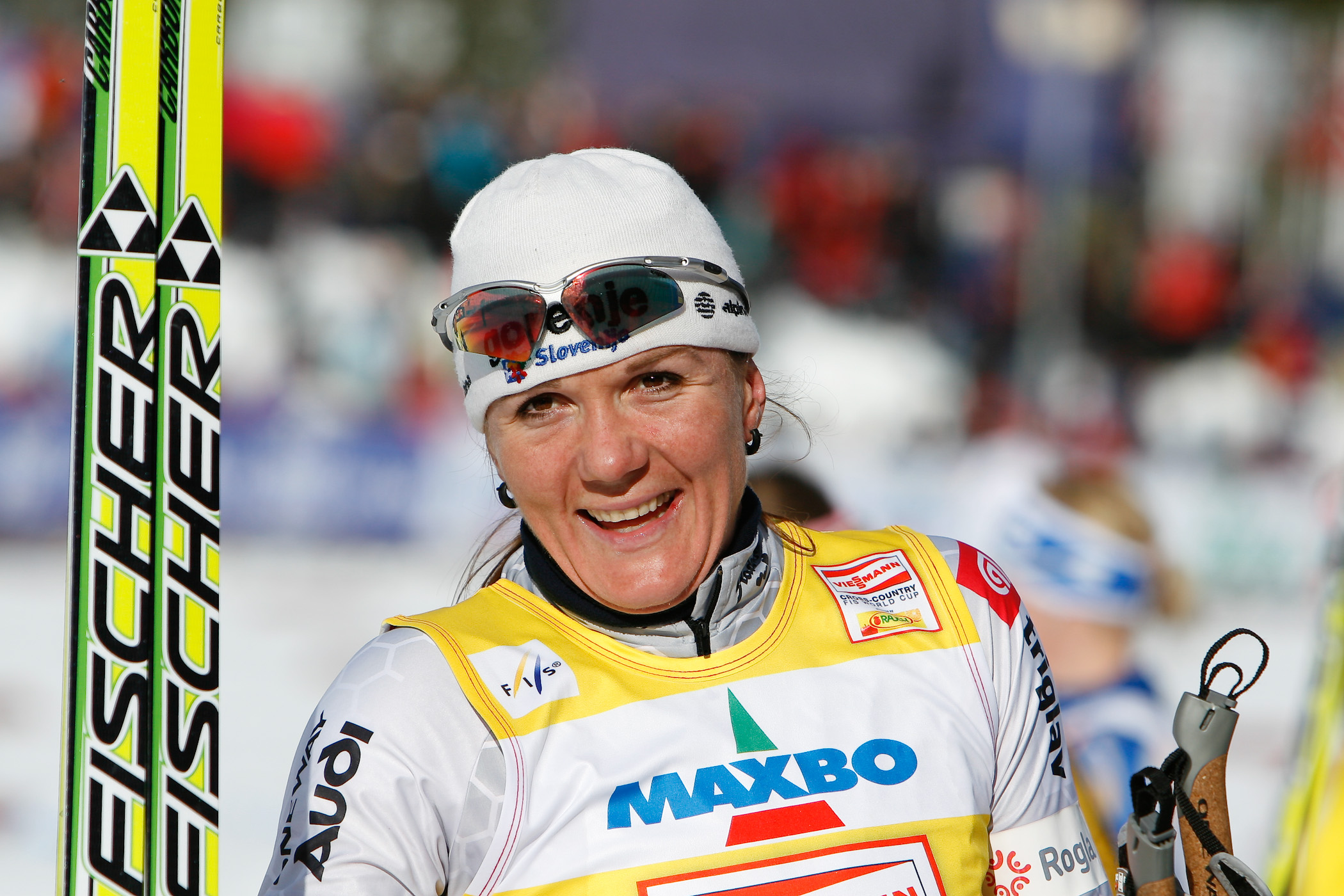
Petra Majdič

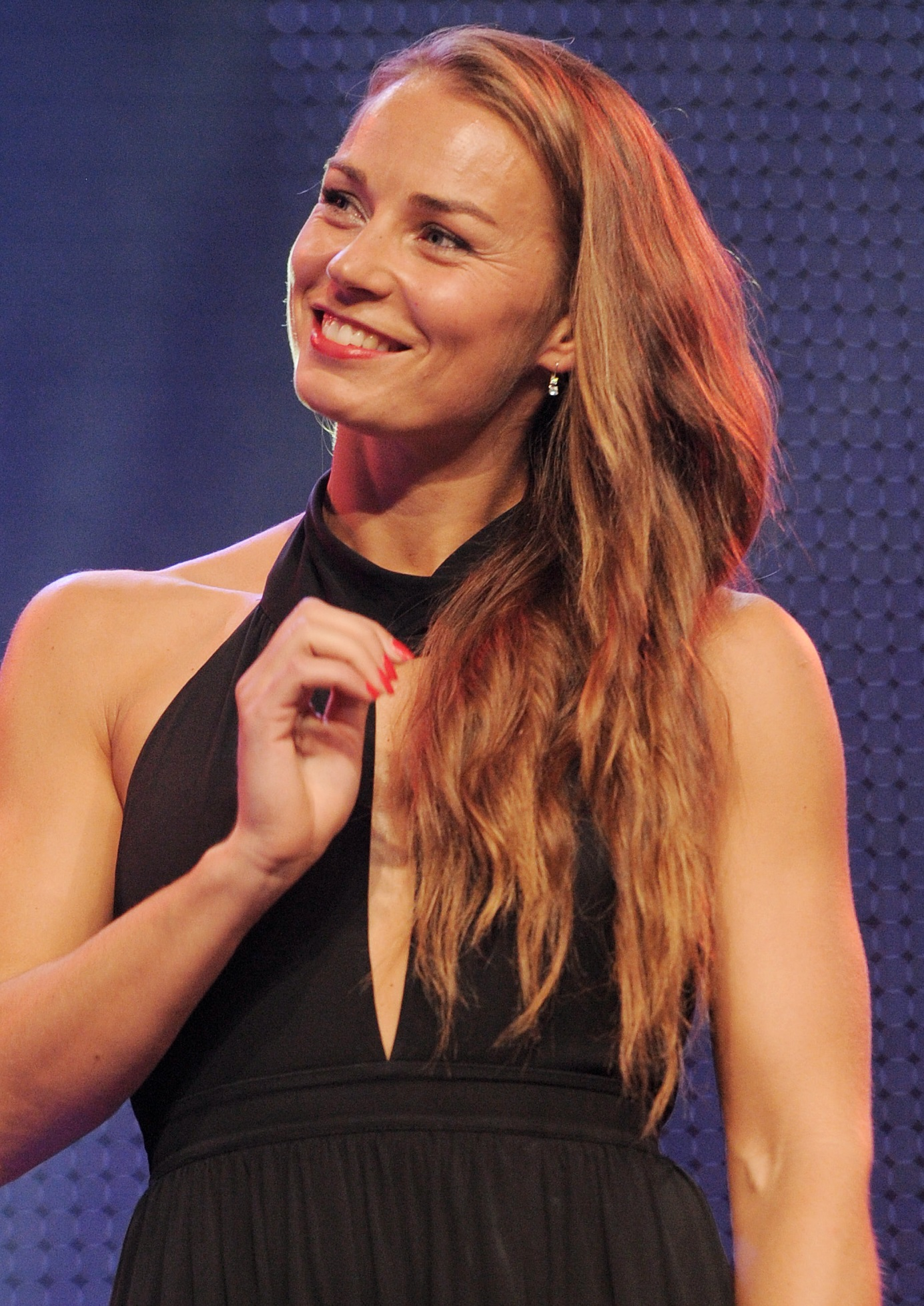
Tina Maze

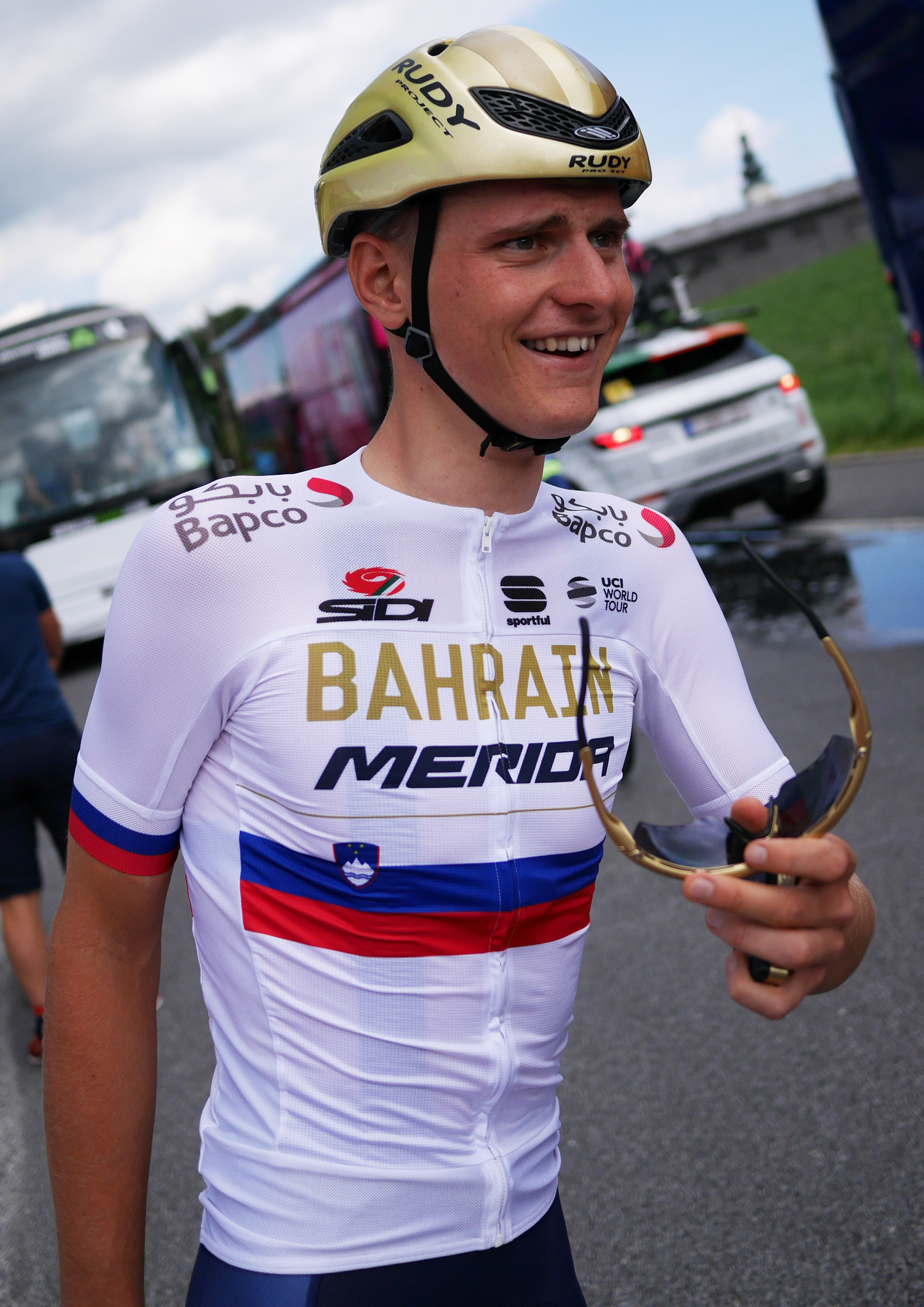
Matej Mohorič

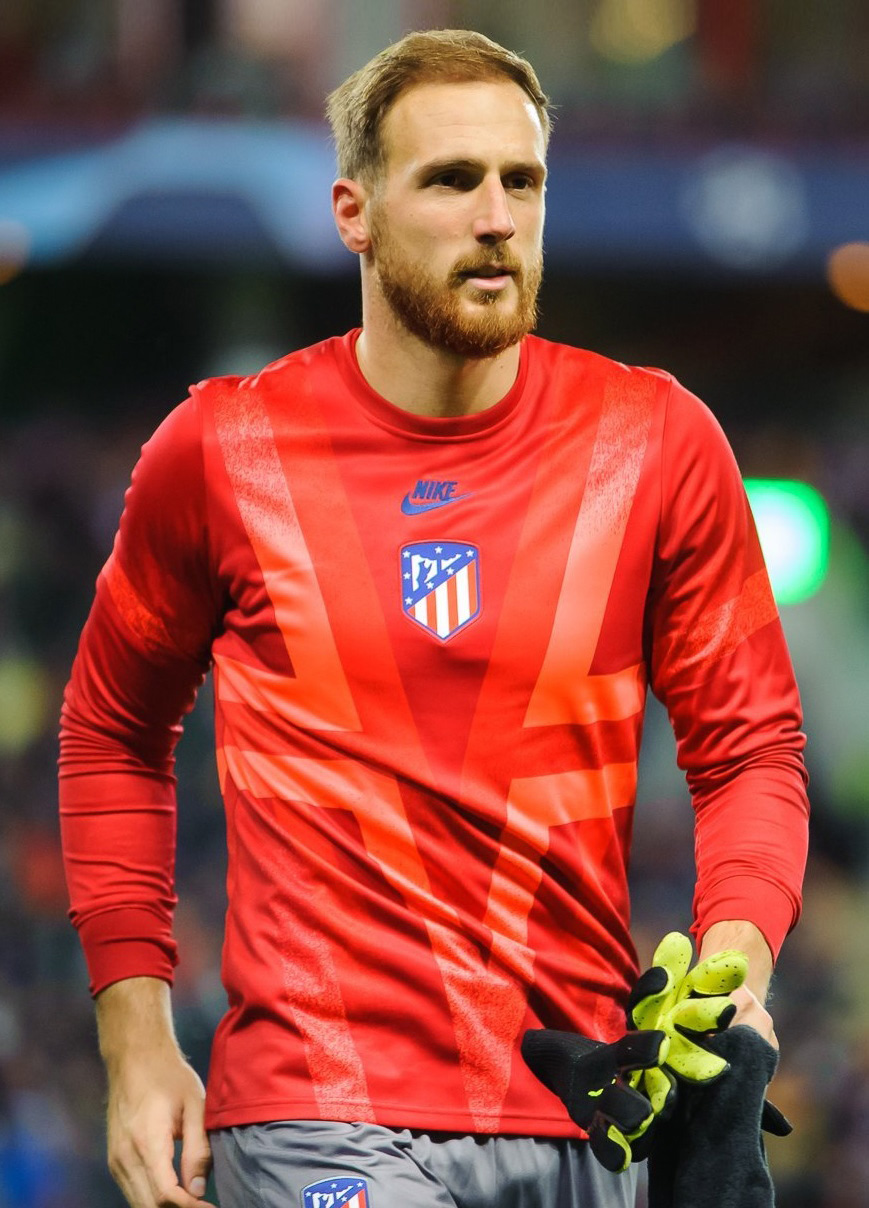
Jan Oblak

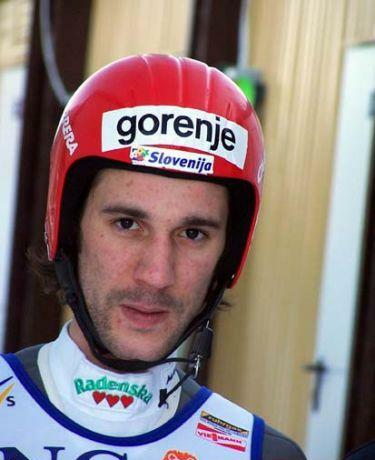
Primož Peterka

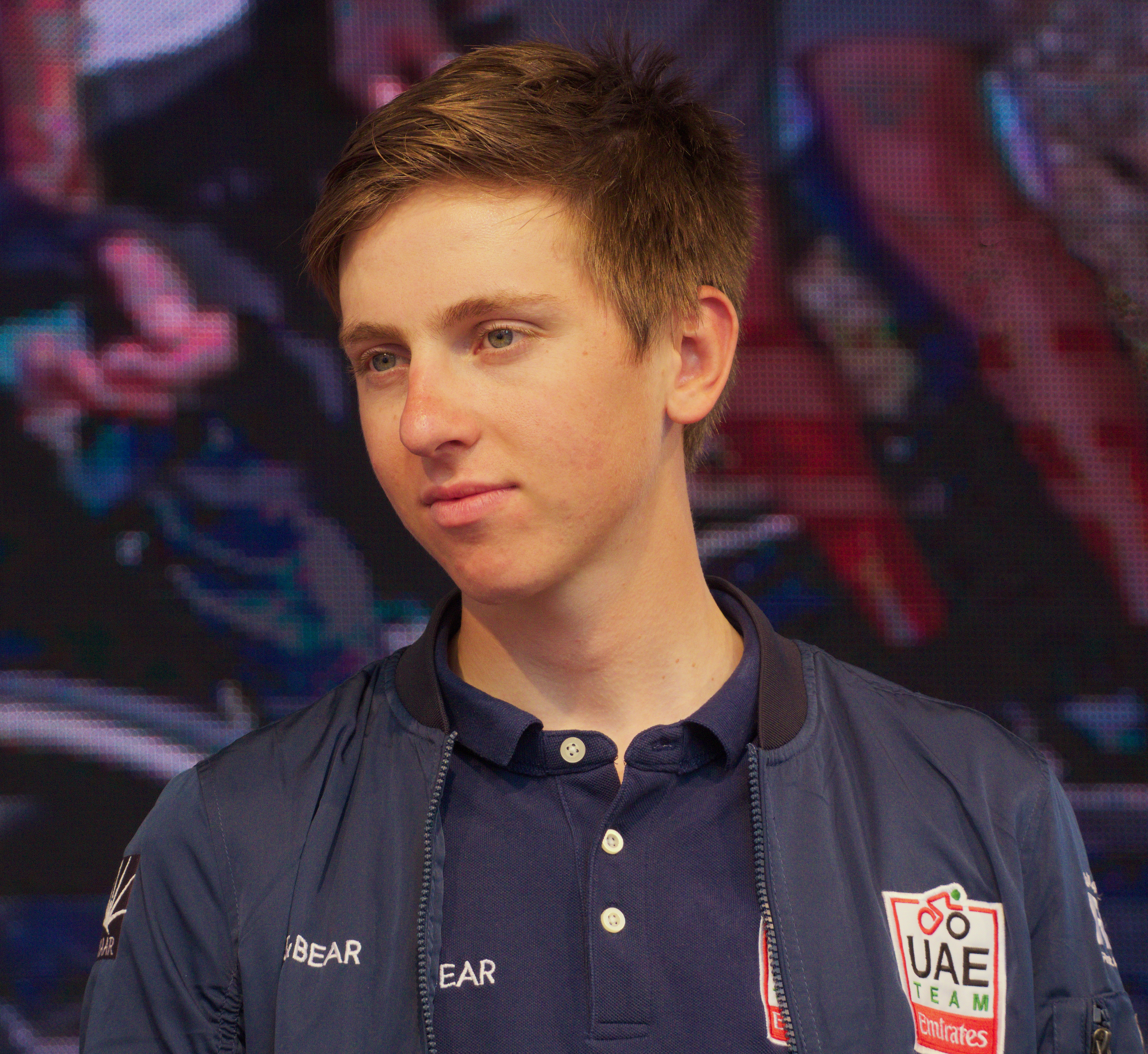
Tadej Pogačar

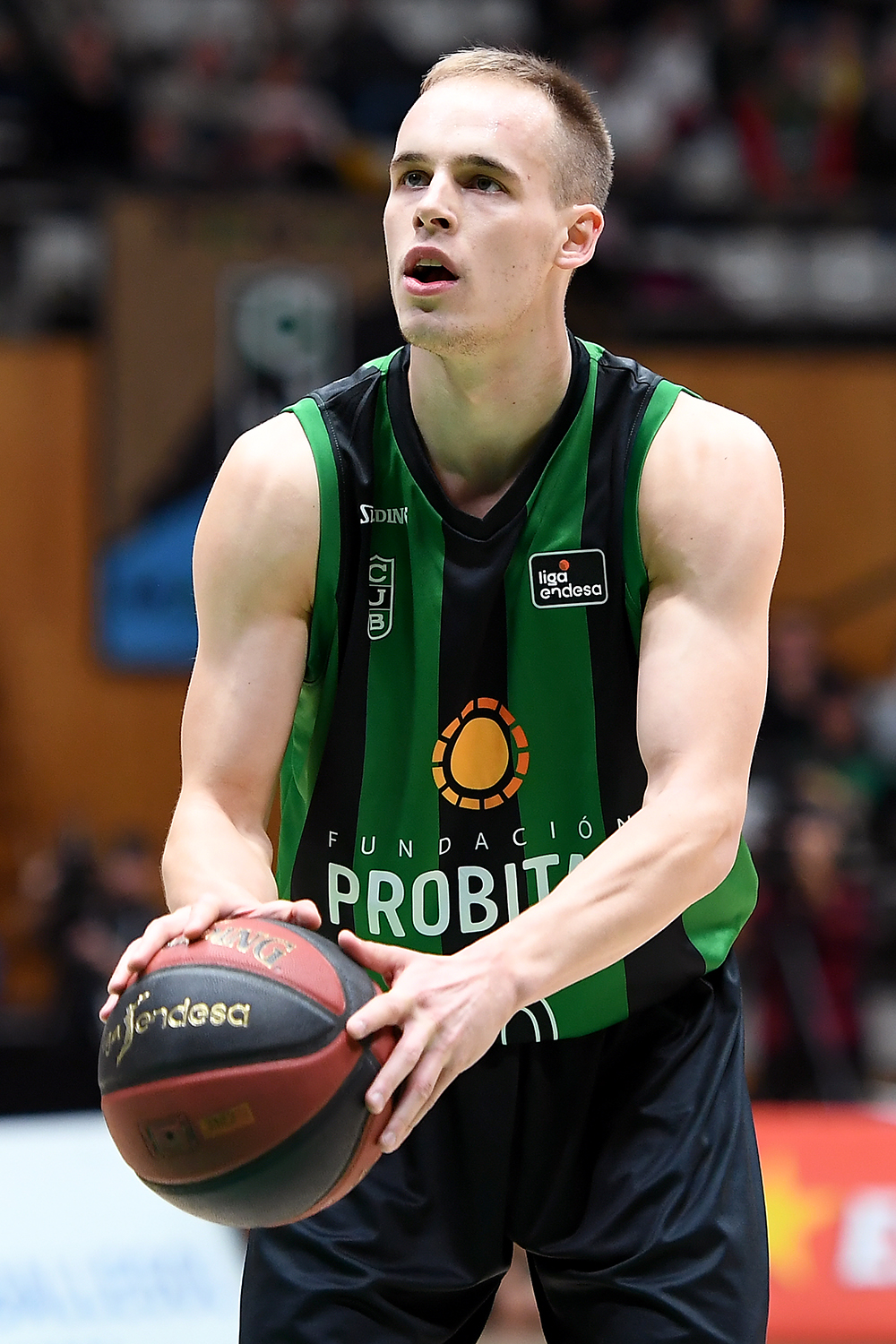
Klemen Prepelič

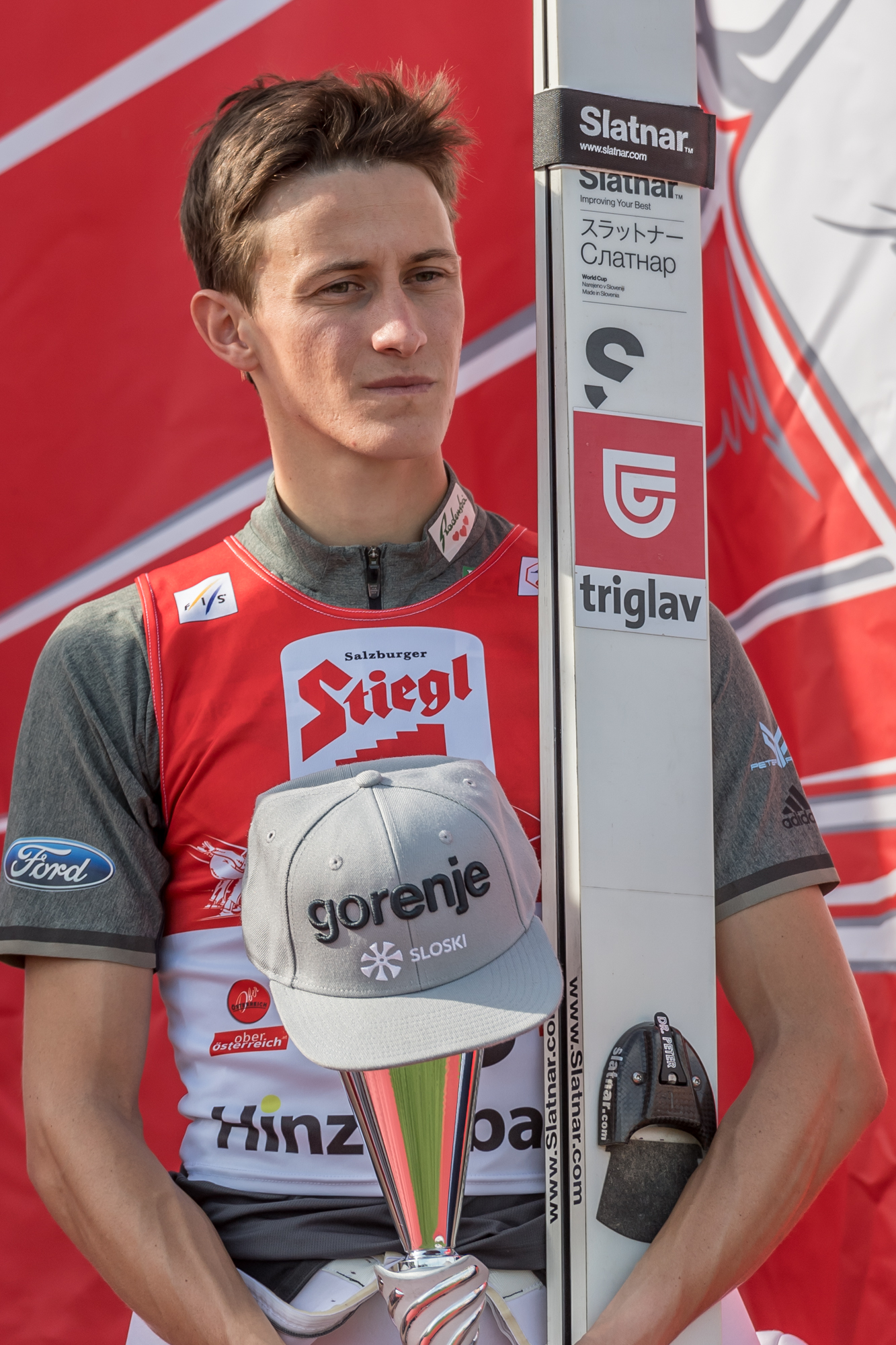
Peter Prevc

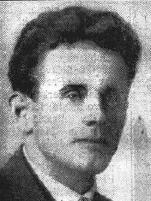
Josip Primožič

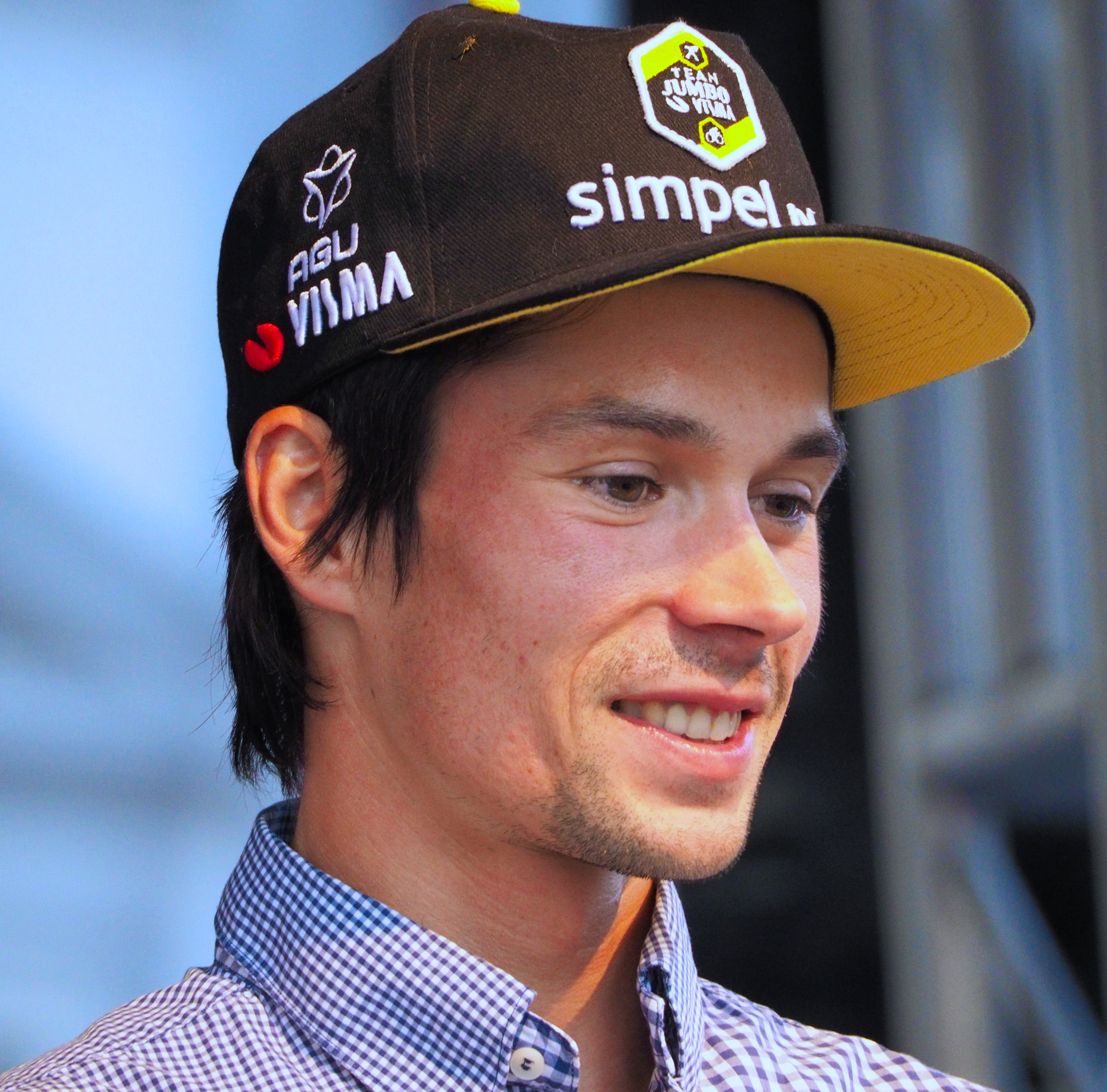
Primož Roglič

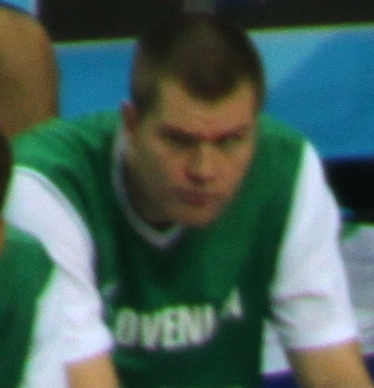
Uroš Slokar

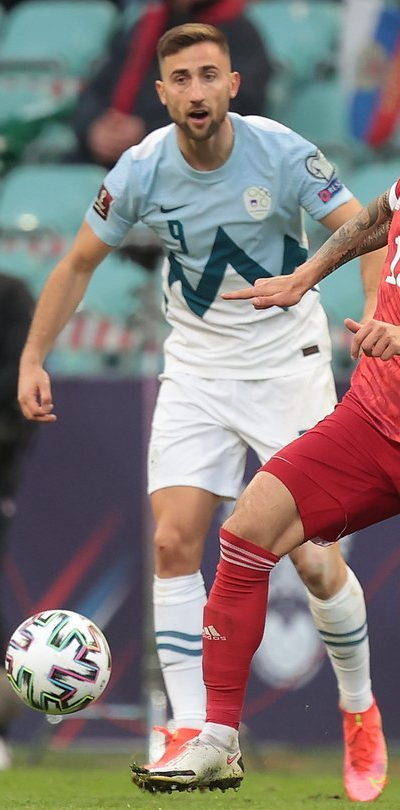
Andraž Šporar

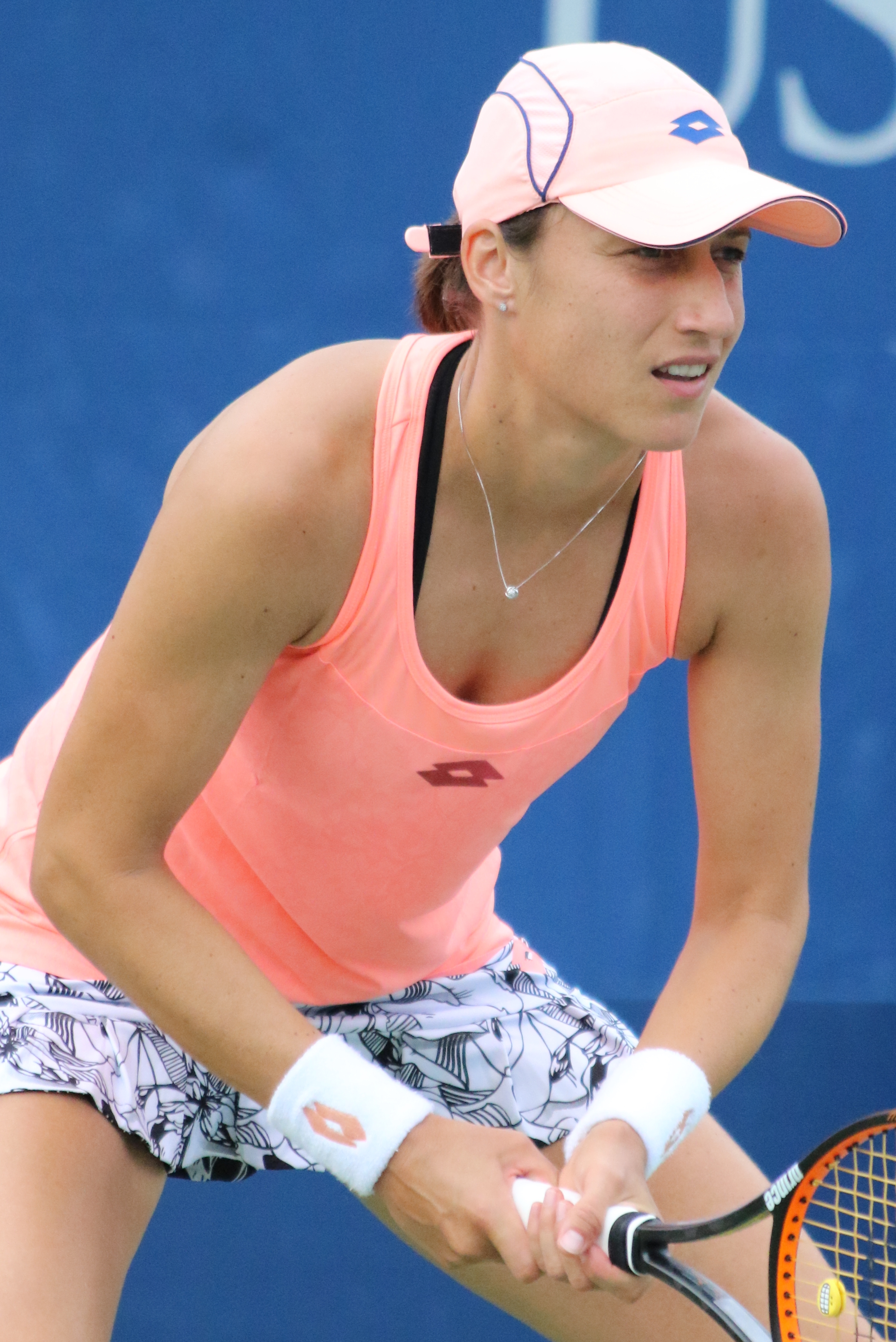
Katarina Srebotnik

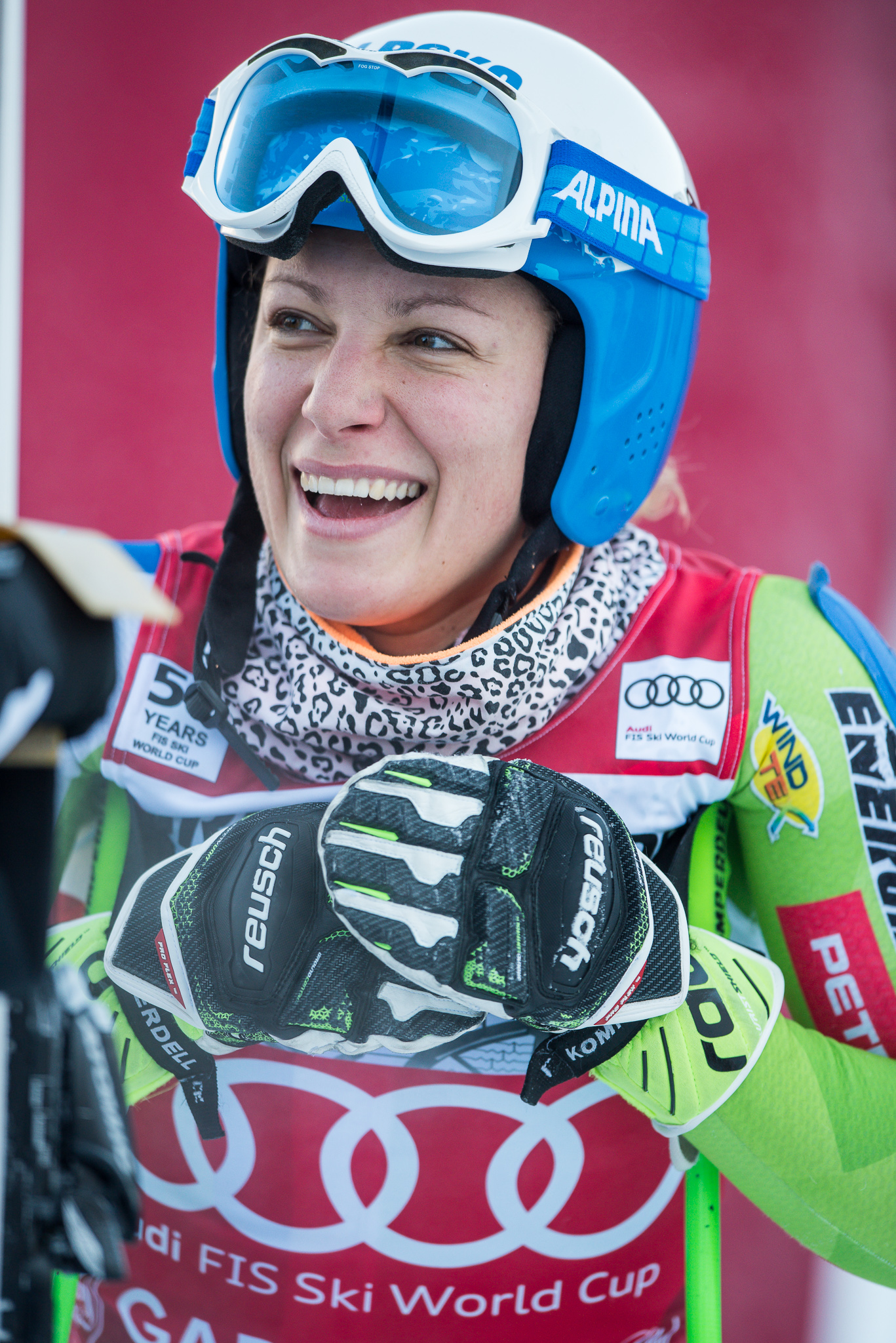
Ilka Štuhec

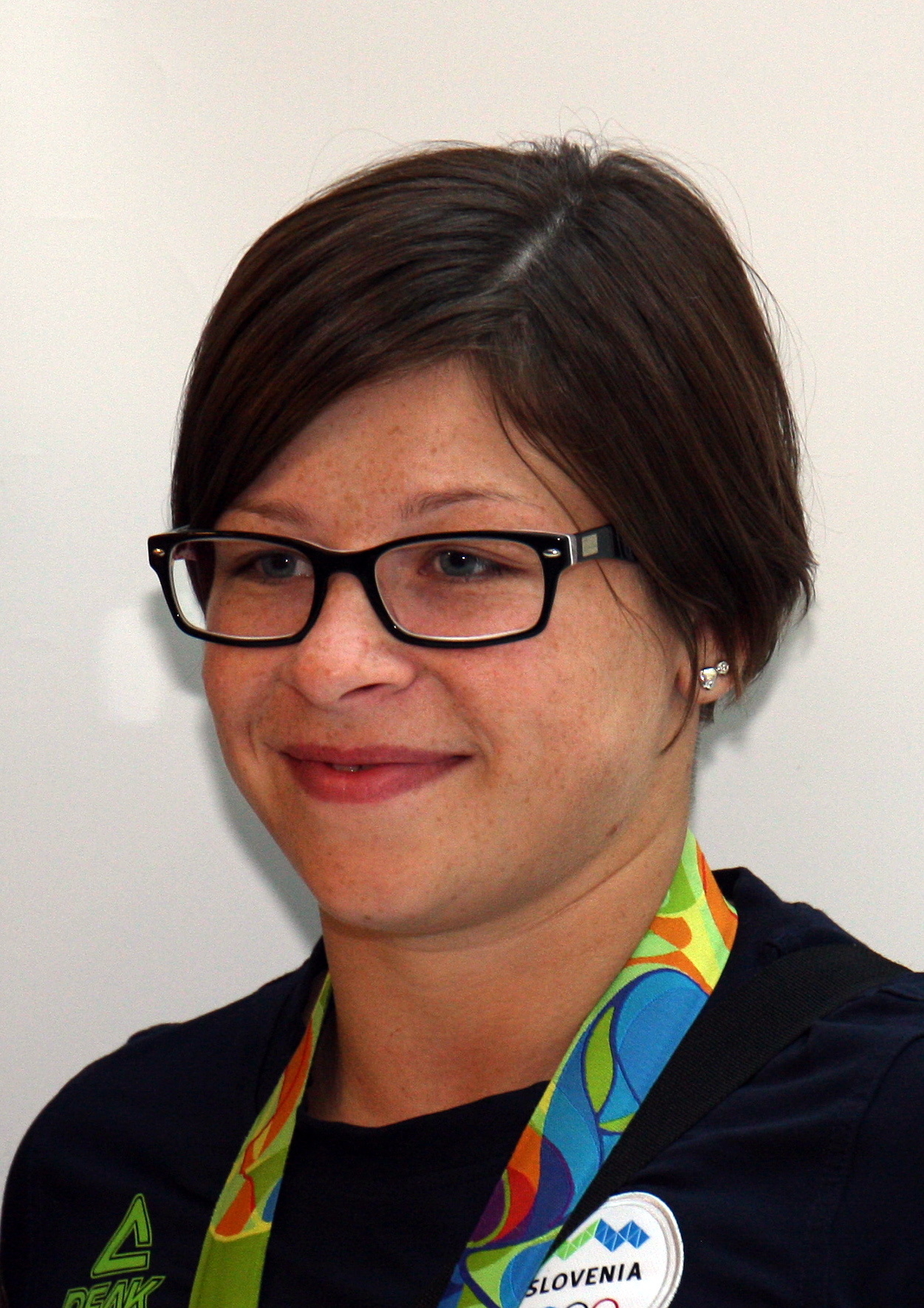
Tina Trstenjak

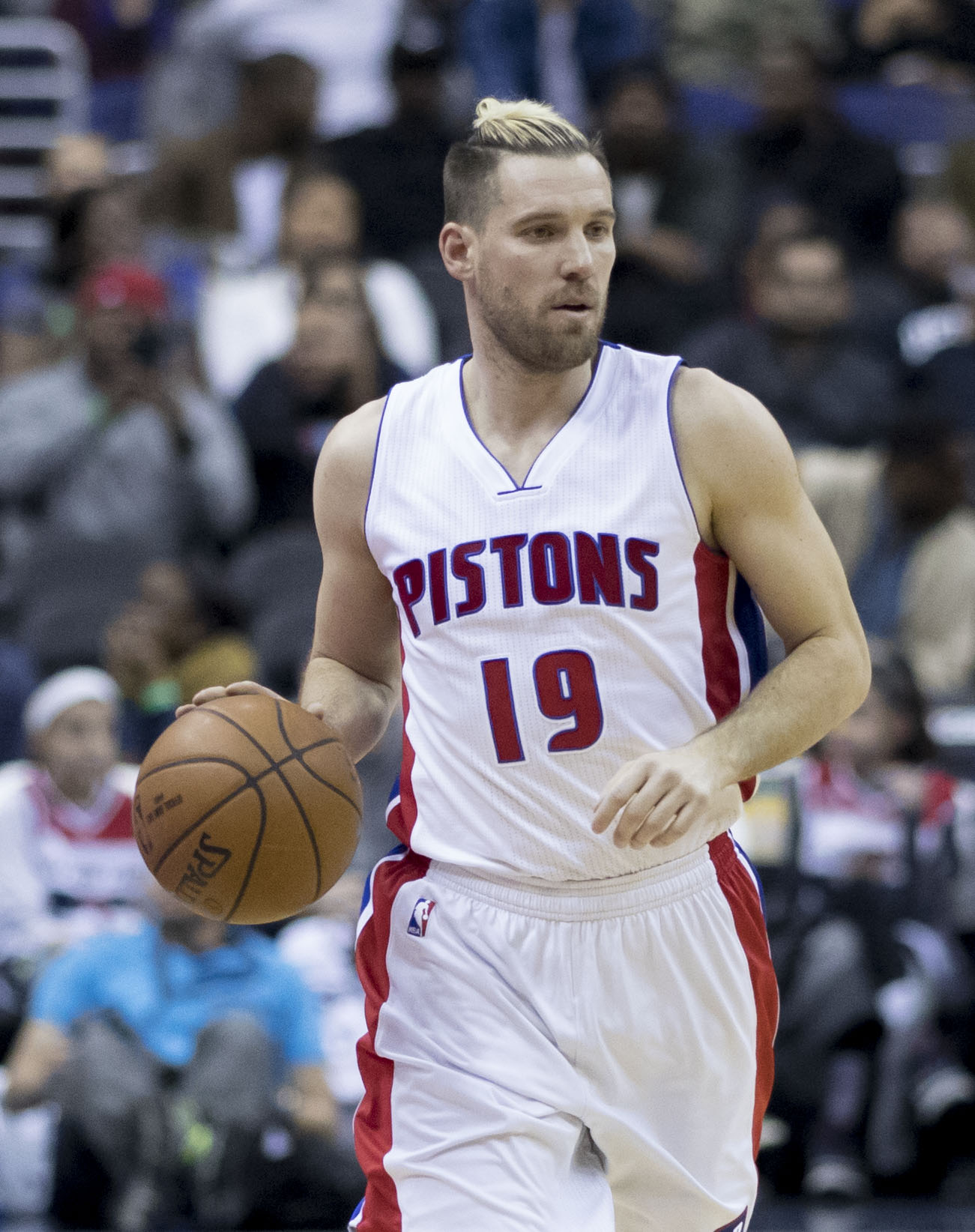
Beno Udrih

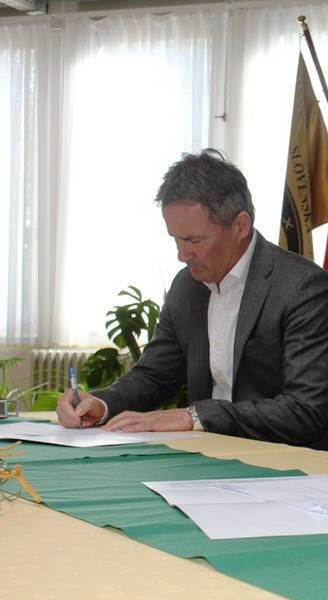
Primož Ulaga

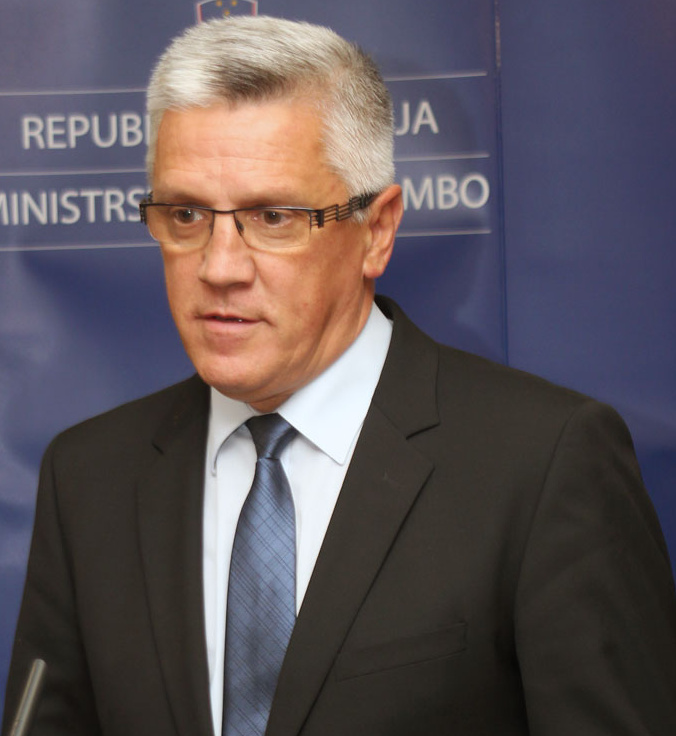
Peter Vilfan

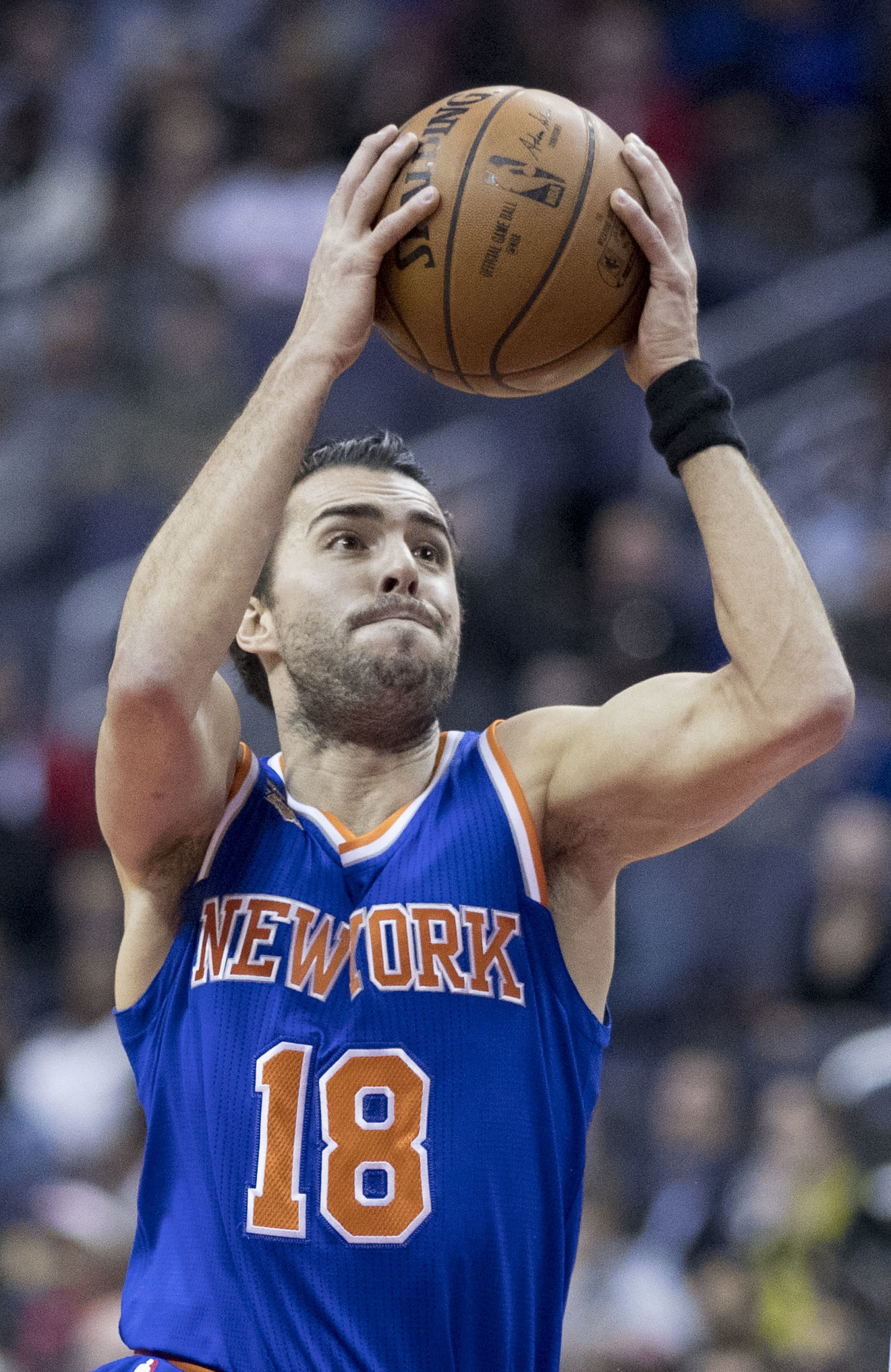
Sasha Vujačić

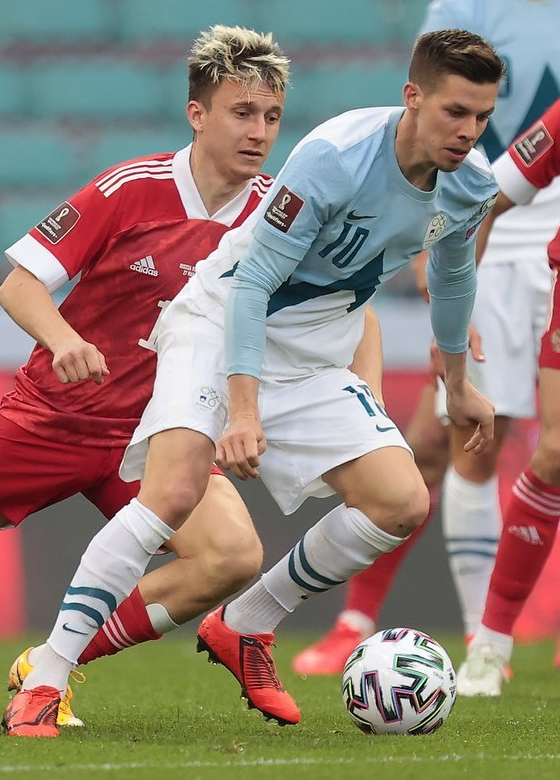
Miha Zajc

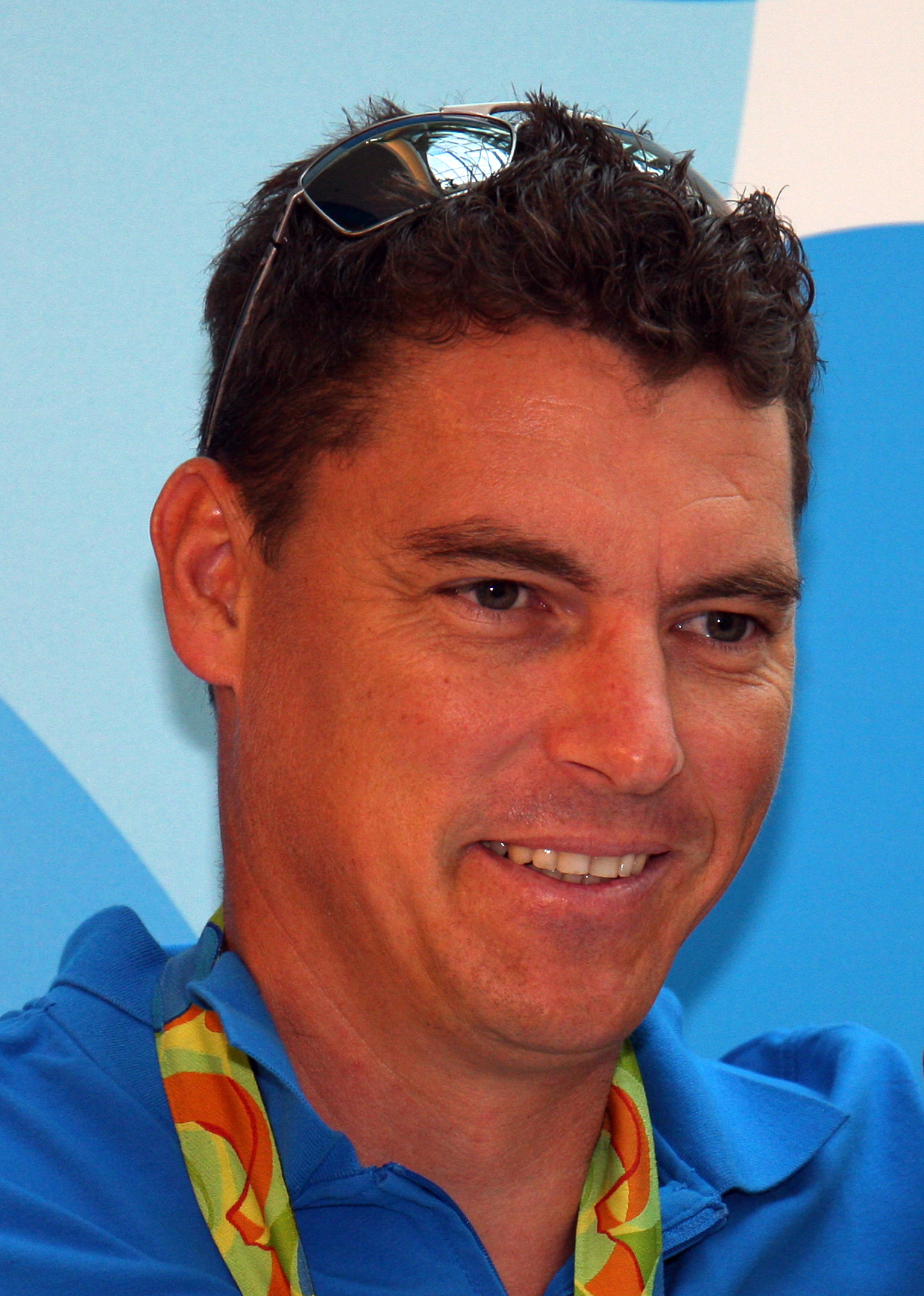
Vasilij Žbogar

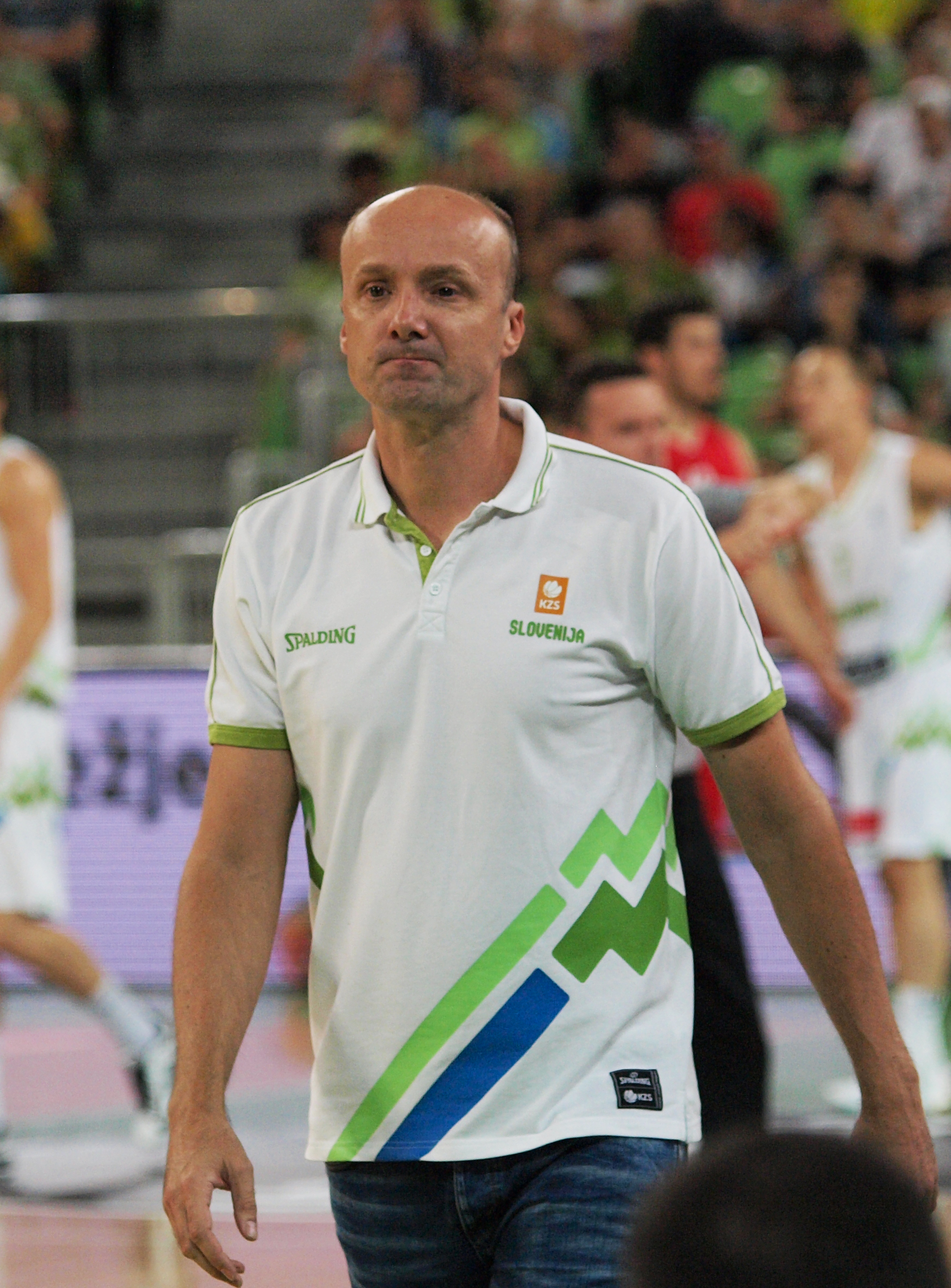
Jure Zdovc

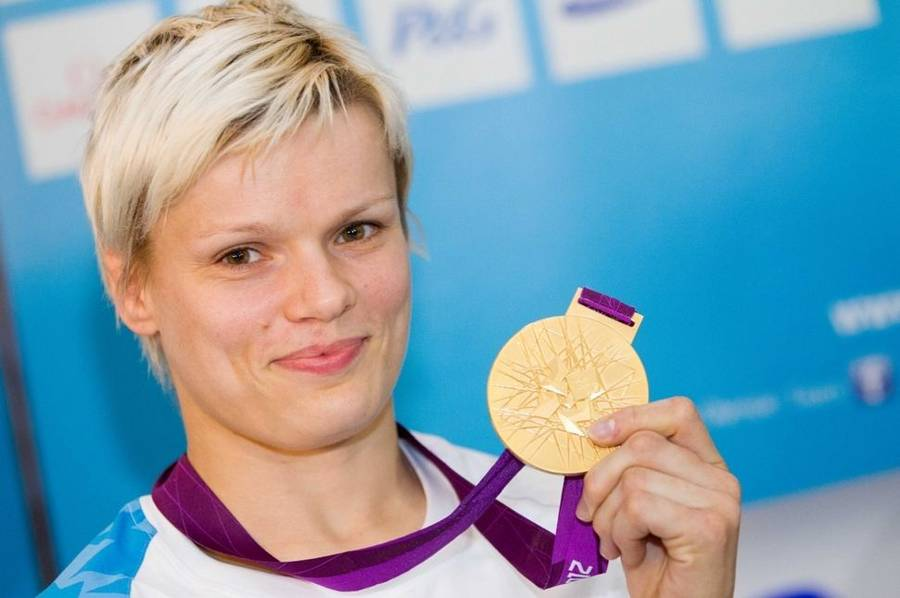
Urška Žolnir

== Other people ==
- Danilo Dolci (1924–1997) – sociologist and political activist (Slovenian mother)
- Aleš Hlad – supermoto racer and 2005 European Champion
- Pavla Hočevar (1889–1972) – teacher, writer, socialist and suffragist
- Ivan Kramberger (1936–1992) – philanthropist
- Pavla Jerina Lah (1915–2007) – surgeon and partisan
- Klemen Pevec (Pylo) – software developer (creator of MCreator)
- Shenphen Rinpoche (born 1969) – abbot of first Buddhist Congregation in Slovenia
- Melania Trump (born Melanija Knavs, later changed to Knauss, born 1970) – model, spouse of U.S. President Donald Trump, First Lady of the United States of America
- Walter Wolf (born 1939) – businessman
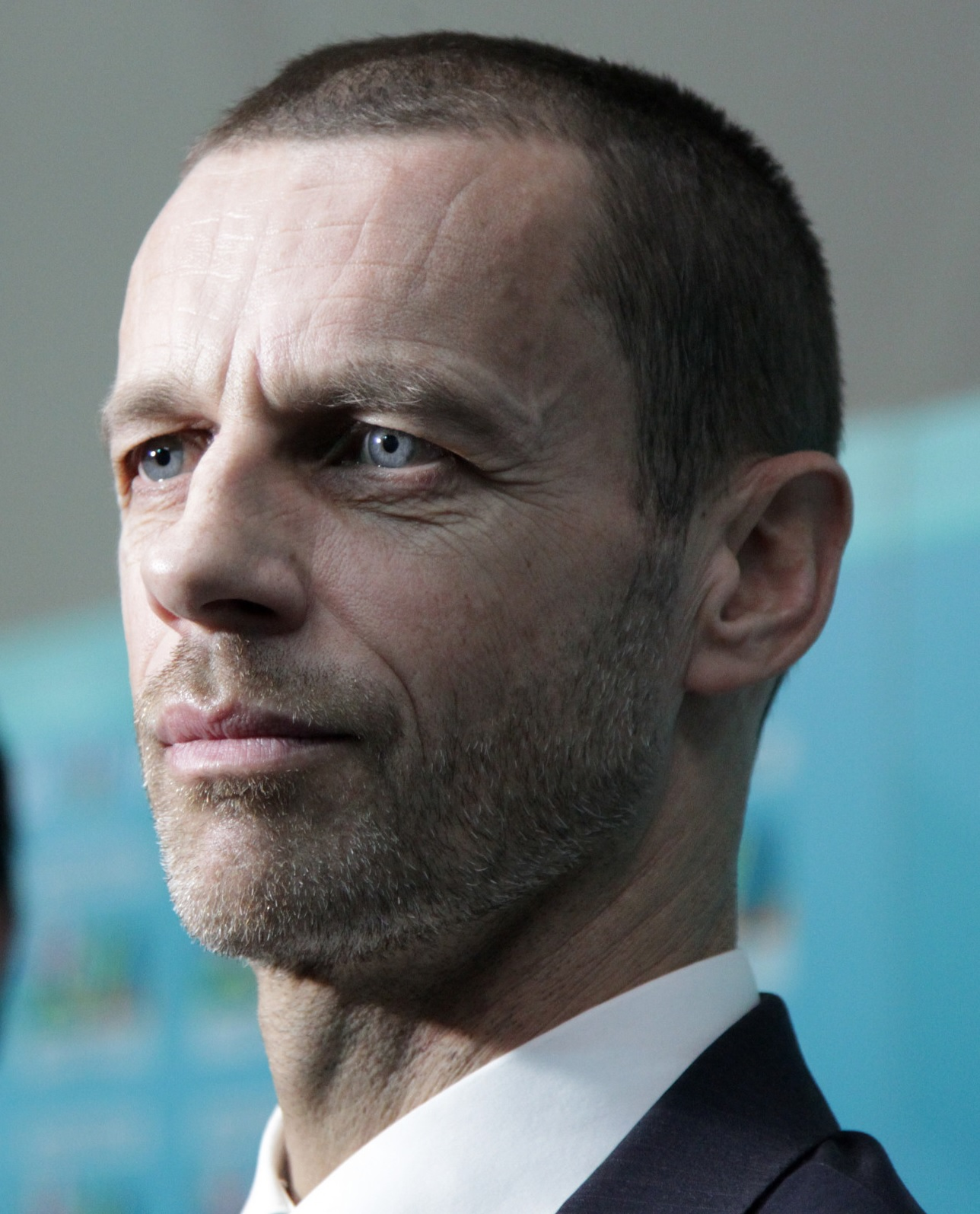
Aleksander Čeferin

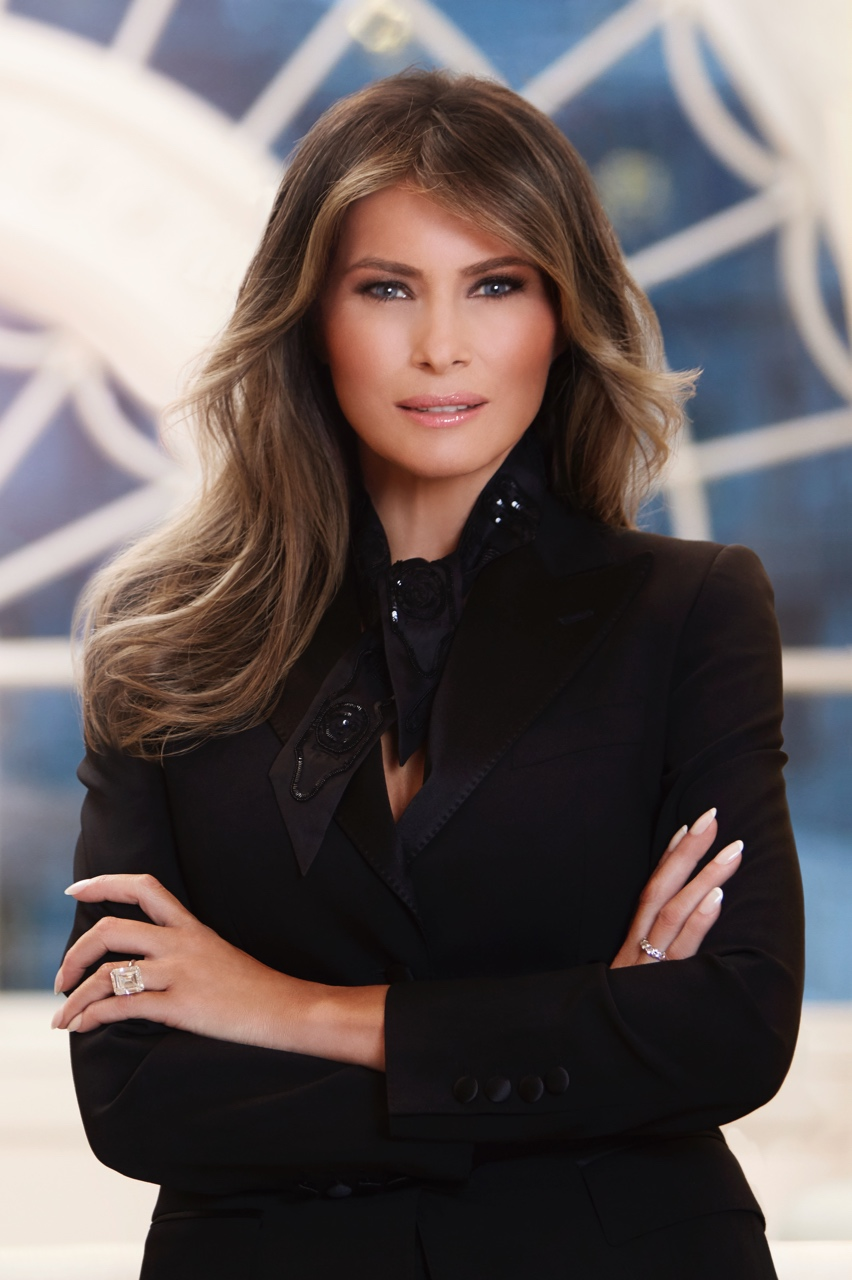
Melania Trump

== See also ==
- List of people by nationality
- List of Slovene writers and poets in Hungary
- List of Slovenian artists
- List of Slovenian computer scientists
- List of Slovenian playwrights
- List of Slovenian mathematicians
- List of Slovenian physicists
- Slovenian Americans
- Slovene Australians
- Slovenian Canadians
- Slovenes of Croatia
