= List of University of Ljubljana people =

This is a partially sorted list of notable persons who have had ties to the University of Ljubljana.

== Distinguished faculty ==
=== Architecture ===
- Jože Plečnik
- Edvard Ravnikar
- Ivan Vurnik

=== The arts ===
- Božidar Jakac, drawing and graphics
- Boris Kalin, sculpture
- Gojmir Anton Kos, painting
- Pino Mlakar, performing arts
- Zora Stančič, lithographic printmaker

=== Economics, administration and political science ===
- Mihael Brejc, public administration
- Milko Brezigar, economics
- Vlado Dimovski, economics and management
- Andrej Gosar, economics and political theory
- Dušan Mramor, economics
- Dušan Radonjič, economics
- Dimitrij Rupel, international relations
- Gregor Virant, public administration

=== Humanities and social sciences ===
- Miran Božovič, philosophy
- Tatjana Bregant, prehistoric archaeology
- Milan Brglez, political theory, international relations
- Aleš Debeljak, cultural studies
- Božidar Debenjak, philosophy
- Mladen Dolar, philosophy
- Mitja Ferenc, history
- Arturo Gavazzi, geography
- Christian Gostečnik, theology and psychology
- Bogo Grafenauer, Medieval history
- Vekoslav Grmič, theology
- Miran Hladnik, literary historian
- Toussaint Hočevar, economic history
- Gert Hofmann, German literature
- Marija Klobčar, ethnologist
- Dean Komel, philosophy
- Milko Kos, history
- Avgust Pavel, ethnology and philology
- Dušan Pirjevec, comparative literature
- Janko Pleterski, history
- Igor Pribac, philosophy of history
- Janko Prunk, history
- Rado Riha, philosophy and psychoanalysis
- Franc Rode, theology
- Dimitrij Rupel, sociology, international relations
- Vasko Simoniti, history
- Igor Škamperle, cultural sociology
- Peter Štih, history
- Anton Stres, theology
- Gregor Tomc, sociology
- Aleš Ušeničnik, theology
- Marta Verginella, history
- Sergij Vilfan, legal history
- Peter Vodopivec, history
- Adela Žgur, German and English literature
- Slavoj Žižek, philosophy
- Alenka Zupančič, philosophy
- Fran Zwitter, history

=== Law ===
- France Bučar, law and public administration
- Boris Furlan, philosophy of Law
- Peter Jambrek, Constitutional Law
- Leonid Pitamic, philosophy of Law
- Danilo Türk, international law

=== Linguistics ===
- Dalibor Brozović
- Janez Orešnik
- Marko Snoj
- Jože Toporišič
- Zinka Zorko

=== Mathematics ===
- Josip Globevnik
- Dragan Marušič
- Marko Petkovšek
- Josip Plemelj

=== Medicine ===
- Bojan Accetto, gerontology
- Milan Pogačnik, veterinary medicine

=== Natural sciences ===
- France Adamič, biology
- Robert Blinc, physics
- Matija Gogala, biology
- Anton Peterlin, physics
- Wojciech Rubinowicz, theoretical physics
- Janez Strnad, physics
- Martin Čopič, physics
- Tomaž Prosen, physics

=== Technology ===
- Ivan Bratko, computer science
- Bojan Kraut, civil engineering
- Tomaž Pisanski, computer science
- Franc Solina, computer science
- Denis Trček, computer science
- Milan Vidmar, electrical engineering
- Blaž Zupan, computer science

== Notable alumni ==
=== Architects ===
- Marjetica Potrč
- Edvard Ravnikar
- Vojteh Ravnikar

=== Artists ===
- Stojan Batič, sculptor
- Janez Lapajne, film director
- Miljenko Licul, designer
- Adriana Maraž, painter
- Pino Mlakar, choreographer

=== Authors ===
- France Balantič, poet
- Vladimir Bartol, writer
- Matej Bor, poet
- Ivo Brnčić, author and critic
- Aleš Debeljak, poet and sociologist
- Jože Javoršek, playwright and essayist
- Edvard Kocbek, poet
- Srečko Kosovel, poet
- Juš Kozak, writer
- Primož Kozak, playwright and essayist
- Feri Lainšček, novelist and screenwriter
- Iztok Osojnik, poet
- Žarko Petan, essayist
- Alojz Rebula, writer and essayist
- Tomaž Šalamun, poet
- Dušan Šarotar, writer, literary critic and editor
- Rudi Šeligo, novelist, playwright and politician
- Peter Semolič, poet
- Anja Štefan, writer, poet and story teller
- Aleš Šteger, poet
- Bojan Štih, stage director, literary critic and essayist

=== Businessmen ===
- Filip Smrekar Apih
- Zoran Janković

=== Law ===
- Nina Betetto, lawyer and judge, former vice-president of the Supreme Court of Slovenia
- Ljuba Prenner (1906-1977), noted criminal attorney and author of the first crime novel published in Slovenia.

=== Physicians ===
- Bojan Accetto
- Janez Janež
- Milan Pogačnik

=== Politicians and diplomats ===
- Janez Drnovšek, President of Slovenia 2002-2007
- Mitja Gaspari, economist and politician
- Peter Jambrek, sociologist, jurist and politician
- Janez Janša, politician
- Iztok Jarc, diplomat and politician
- Romana Jordan Cizelj, Member of European Parliament
- Jelko Kacin, politician
- Milan Kučan, President of Slovenia
- Dragutin Mate, diplomat and politician
- Mojca Drčar Murko, journalist and Member of the European Parliament
- Ljudmila Novak, Member of European Parliament
- Borut Pahor, politician
- Lojze Peterle, politician, head of the first democratic Government of Slovenia
- Milan Pogačnik, politician
- Janez Potočnik, European Commissioner
- Jože Pučnik, dissident, sociologist, president of the DEMOS coalition
- Anton Rop, former Prime Minister of Slovenia
- Dimitrij Rupel, Foreign Minister of Slovenia, writer
- Matjaž Šinkovec, diplomat and politician
- Jožef Školč, politician
- Melania Trump, First Lady of the United States
- Danilo Türk, diplomat; former Assistant Secretary-General for Political Affairs for the United Nations; President of Slovenia
- Milan Zver, politician, sociologist and political scientist

=== Scientists and academians ===
- Robert Blinc, physicist
- Katja Boh, sociologist, diplomat and politician
- Davorin Dolar, chemist
- Mladen Dolar, philosopher
- Draga Garašanin, prehistorian and archaeologist
- Boris M. Gombač, historian
- Andreja Gomboc, astrophysicist
- Bogo Grafenauer, historian
- Taras Kermauner, literary theoretician and historian
- Milan Komar, philosopher
- Rado Lenček, Professor of Slavic Studies at Columbia University
- Jure Leskovec, computer scientist
- Oto Luthar, historian
- Vasilij Melik, historian
- Emilija Mlakar Branc, mathematician and author of mathematics textbooks
- Janez Orešnik, linguist
- Jože Pirjevec, historian
- Janko Pleterski, historian, diplomat and politician
- Dušan Repovš, mathematician
- Rado Riha, philosopher
- Renata Salecl, legal theorist
- Ljubo Sirc, economist, professor at Glasgow University
- Simona Škrabec, literary theorist; professor at the Autonomous University of Barcelona
- Anton Strle, theologian
- Janez Strnad, physicist
- Gregor Tomc, sociologist and musician
- Ivan Vidav, mathematician
- Milica Kacin Wohinz, historian
- Egon Zakrajšek, computer scientist
- Slavoj Žižek, philosopher
- Alenka Zupančič, philosopher
- Fran Zwitter, historian

=== Others ===
- Janez Gradišnik, translator
- Pavla Jerina Lah, surgeon and partisan
- Bruno Parma, chess player and Grandmaster
- Alenka Puhar, columnist, historian, political activist
- Manca Marcelan, rhythmic gymnast

== See also ==
- Education in Slovenia
- List of people from Ljubljana
