= Franc (disambiguation) =

The franc is the name of several currency units, most notably the French franc.

Franc or francs may refer also to:

== People ==
=== Given name ===
- Franc Abulnar (1909–1995), Yugoslav cyclist
- Franc Breckerfeld (1681–1744), Slovenian theologian, mathematician, astronomer and latinist
- Franz Caucig (Slovene: Franc Kavčič) (1755–1828), neoclassical painter
- Franc Červan (1936–1991), Yugoslav long-distance runner
- Franc Cifer (born 1971), Slovenian retired footballer
- Franc Cvenkelj (1925–1997), Slovenian alpine skier
- Franc Fernandez, Argentine artist and fashion designer best known for creating Lady Gaga's meat dress
- Franciszek Fiszer (1860–1937), better known as Franc Fiszer, Polish bon-vivant, gourmand and philosopher
- Franc Flotron (born 1954), American former politician
- Franc Fridl (born 1972), Slovenian retired footballer
- Franc Grom (born c. 1940), Slovenian artist
- Franc Hafner (born 1936), Yugoslav middle-distance runner
- Franc Hočevar (1853–1919), Austrian–Slovenian mathematician
- Franc Joubin (1911–1997), American-born Canadian prospector and geologist
- Franc Kangler (born 1965), Slovenian politician
- Feri Lainšček (born Franc Lainšček in 1959), Slovenian writer, poet and screenwriter
- Franc Luz (born 1950), American actor
- Franz Miklosich a.k.a. Franc Miklošič (1813–1891), Slovenian philologist
- Franc Očko (born 1960), Slovenian judoka
- Franc Palme (born 1914), Slovenian former ski jumper
- Francis Xavier Pierz (Slovene: Franc Pirc or Franc Pirec) (1785–1880), Roman Catholic priest and missionary to the Ottawa and Ojibwe Indians
- Franc Reyes (disambiguation)
- Franc Roddam (born 1946), English film director, businessman, screenwriter, television producer and publisher
- Franc Rode (born 1934), Slovenian Roman Catholic cardinal
- Franc Rozman (1911–1944), Slovenian partisan commander in World War II
- Franc Škerlj (born 1941), Yugoslav former cyclist
- Franc Smolej (ice hockey) (born 1940), Slovenian ice hockey player
- Franc Smolej (skier) (1908–?), Yugoslav cross-country skier
- Franc Snoj (1902–1962), Slovenian politician and economist
- Ferenc Talányi (Slovene: Franc Talanyi or Talanji) (1883–1959), Slovenian writer, journalist and painter
- François Tétaz (born 1970), Australian film composer, music producer and mixer
- Franc Treiber (1809–1878), Slovenian Roman Catholic priest, poet and composer
- Franc Veliu (born 1988), Albanian footballer
- Franc Weerwind (born 1964), Dutch politician
- Franc Žitnik (born 1941), Yugoslav retired slalom canoeist

=== Surname ===
- André Franc (1911–1990s), French biologist and malacologist
- Caroline Franc (born 1971) French journalist, writer and screenwriter, also known as Caroline Desages
- Guillaume Franc (c. 1505 – 1571), French musician and composer active in Geneva and Lausanne
- Isabel Franc (born 1955), Spanish writer
- Leo Frank (lynched 1915)
- Livvi Franc, stage name of British Barbadian singer-songwriter Olivia Waithe (born 1988)
- Michal Franc (born 1967), Czech fencer
- Otto Franc ((1846–1903), German-born American cattle baron, sheriff and judge
- Urban Franc (born 1975), Slovenian former ski jumper

== Other uses ==
- French name for the Franks
- Francs, Gironde, a commune of the Gironde département, in France
- Francs Peak, Wyoming, United States, named after Otto Franc

== See also ==
- Marie Le Franc (1879–1964), French writer
- Martin le Franc (c. 1410–1461), French poet
- Franc Noir de la Haute-Saône, a traditional French variety of red wine grape
