= Political prisoners in Yugoslavia =

Political prisoners in Yugoslavia were held throughout both systems of government of the former country. Most political prisoners in the Kingdom of Yugoslavia (1918–1941) were communists, whereas the Socialist Federal Republic of Yugoslavia (1945–1992) primarily incarcerated real and alleged Stalinists during and after the Informbiro period, anti-communists, nationalists and dissidents (including those driving for regional autonomy or independence), all of which were perceived as a threat to the system.

== Socialist Yugoslavia (1945–92) ==
- Črtomir Nagode, Ljubo Sirc, Leon Kavčnik, Boris Furlan, Zoran Hribar, Angela Vode, Metod Kumelj, Pavla Hočevar, Svatopluk Zupan, Bogdan Stare, Metod Pirc, Vid Lajovic, Franjo Sirc, Elizabeta Hribar and Franc Snoj, who stood at the Nagode Trial in 1947.
- Vlado Dapčević spent a total of 24 years in Yugoslav prisons as a political dissident for advocating anti-revisionism and Proletarian internationalism.
- Ali Aliu was arrested three times and spent ten years in prison for Albanian separatism.
- Milovan Djilas
- Jože Pučnik, arrested in 1958 for "subversion of the Socialist system" and sentenced to 9 years in jail, released in 1963, arrested again in 1964 serving two more years.
- Adem Demaçi, first arrested for his opposition to the authoritarian government of Josip Broz Tito in 1958, serving three years in prison. He was again imprisoned 1964-1974 and 1975-1990. He was released from prison by new president of Serbia, Slobodan Milošević.
- Alija Izetbegović was arrested and sentenced to three years in prison in 1946 for opposition to the regime. In April 1983, Izetbegović and 12 other Bosnian Muslim activists were tried on "hostile activity and hostile propaganda". Izetbegović was further accused of organizing a visit to a Muslim congress in Iran. All of those tried were convicted and Izetbegović was sentenced to fourteen years in prison. In 1988, as communist rule faltered, he was pardoned and released after almost five years in prison.
- Borislav Pekić.
- Dražen Budiša. Arrested on December 11, 1971, and subsequently in the aftermath of the Croatian Spring student movement. He served four years in Stara Gradiška and Lepoglava. He subsequently became a significant politician in the Republic of Croatia.
- Vlado Gotovac, arrested after the Croatian Spring and sentenced to four years for on "separatist" and "nationalist" charges.
- Bruno Bušić, arrested after the Croatian Spring and was released in 1973.
- Radomir Pejić served a sentence from 1972 to 1974 in Stara Gradiška for "verbal offence against the state".
- Dobroslav Paraga was arrested and tried in May 1981 for collecting signatures for a petition calling for the release of political prisoners. He was released in November 1984.
- Hasan Čengić, Alija Izetbegović and Omer Behmen were arrested in April 1983 and tried before a Sarajevo court for a variety of charges called "offences as principally hostile activity inspired by Muslim nationalism, association for purposes of hostile activity and hostile propaganda", along with ten other Bosniak activists, and pardoned in 1988.
- Prvoslav Vujcic was imprisoned for seven days in 1984 for criticizing the regime in poems.
- Marko Veselica was arrested and tried in 1971 for "felonies against the people and the state" and sentenced to seven years in jail and a subsequent four-year ban on public actions. He was released in 1977, but an interview led to new charges and a sentence of eleven years in jail and another four-year ban on public actions. He was shortly detained in 1989 for taking part in the establishment of new political parties and violating the ban on public acts.
- Vojislav Šešelj was imprisoned 15 May 1984–March 1986.

== Croatia's approach to former political prisoners ==
Croatia's political prisoners' law recognizes those who were imprisoned during the period between December 8, 1918 (the establishment of the Kingdom of Serbs, Croats and Slovenes) and October 8, 1991 (the day Croatia severed all ties to Yugoslavia). Former political prisoners receive compensation for time spent in jail and subsequent time spent unable to secure a job. Political prisoners are organized into the Croatian Society of Political Prisoners (Hrvatsko društvo političkih zatvorenika).
