= List of Slovenian physicists =

This is a list of notable Slovenian physicists.

== A ==
- Miroslav Adlešič

== B ==
- Robert Blinc (1933 - 2011) - materials physicist
- Silvo Breskvar (1902 - 1969)

== C ==
- Andrej Čadež - astrophysicist.
- Lavo Čermelj (1889 - 1980)

== G ==
- Peter Gosar (1923 - )

== K ==
- Ignacij Klemenčič (1853 - 1901)
- Alojz Kodre (1944 - )

== P ==
- Matjaž Perc (1979 - )
- Anton Peterlin (1908 - 1993) -
- Rudolf Podgornik (1955 - 2024) - expert on many topics, from the Casimir effect to biophysics
- Herman Potočnik Noordung (1892 - 1929) - pioneer of astronautics and cosmonautics, and rocket engineer.
- Tomaž Prosen (1970 - )

== S ==
- Jožef Stefan (1835 - 1893) - physicist, mathematician and poet.
- Janez Strnad (1934 - 2015) - physicist and populariser of natural science.

== T ==
- Gašper Tkačik (1979 -)

== V ==
- Jurij Bartolomej Vega (1754 - 1802) - mathematician, physicist and artillery officer, most famous for calculating pi to 140 figures, and creating user friendly logarithm tables.

== Z ==
- Danilo Zavrtanik (1953 - )

== See also ==
- Physicist
- List of Slovenians
