= List of Slovenian mathematicians =

This is a list of Slovenian mathematicians.

== A ==
- Anton Ambschel (1749–1821)

== B ==
- Vladimir Batagelj (1948–)
- Franc Breckerfeld (1681–1744)
- Silvo Breskvar (1902–1969)

== F ==
- Joannes Disma Floriantschitsch de Grienfeld (1691–1757)

== G ==
- Josip Globevnik (1945–)

== H ==
- Ferdinand Augustin Hallerstein (1703–1774)
- Herman of Carinthia (c. 1100–c. 1160)
- Franc Hočevar (1853–1919)

== K ==
- Sandi Klavžar (1962–)
- Josip Križan (1841–1921)
- France Križanič (1928–2002)
- Klavdija Kutnar (1980–)

== L ==
- Ivo Lah (1896–1979)

== M ==
- Dragan Marušič (1953–)
- Emilija Mlakar Branc (1901–1989)
- Bojan Mohar (1956–)
- Nežka Mramor–Kosta

== P ==
- Marko Petkovšek (1955–2023)
- Tomaž Pisanski (1949–)
- Josip Plemelj (1873–1967)

== R ==
- Janez Rakovec (1949–2008)
- Dušan Repovš (1954–)

== S ==
- Jožef Stefan (1835–1893)

== V ==
- Jurij Vega (1754–1802)
- Ivan Vidav (1918–2015)

== Z ==
- Egon Zakrajšek (1941–2002)

== See also ==
- Mathematician
- Geometer
- List of Slovenians
