= Katja Boh =

Slovenian politician and sociologist (1929–2008)

Katja Boh (née Székely, May 16, 1929 – August 8, 2008) was a Slovenian sociologist, diplomat, and politician.

== Early life and career ==
Boh was born in a wealthy middle class family in Ljubljana, Kingdom of Yugoslavia (now the capital of Slovenia). Her father was an Austrian Jew that had converted to Roman Catholicism, and her mother was Slovene. During World War II, she was imprisoned by the Nazis. In 1946 she became engaged to Ljubo Sirc, who later became an economist. The same year, however, Sirc was imprisoned by the communist regime and tried in the Nagode Trial. Due to Sirc's long confinement and later exile, their engagement failed.

She had two stepchildren (Maja and Ali Boh) and a daughter Katja Boh-Cerjak from her marriage to Dr. Boh.

She studied sociology at the University of Ljubljana and obtained her PhD in 1974. She dedicated herself to the study of family patterns, becoming one of the leading European experts in the field.

== Involvement in politics ==
A decided supporter of human rights and political pluralism, she became involved in politics during the Slovenian spring in the 1980s. She was among the co-founders of the Slovenian Social Democratic Party in 1989, together with Jože Pučnik, Matjaž Šinkovec, and France Tomšič.

After the victory of the DEMOS coalition in the first free elections in Slovenia in April 1990, she became the Minister for Health in Lojze Peterle's cabinet. She remained in office until 1991, when she was appointed as the first Slovenian ambassador to Austria. She remained in Vienna until 1997, when she retired. She remained an advisor to the Slovenian Democratic Party, and was one of the coauthors of the party's program on social issues for the 2004 parliamentary elections.

She was also an active member of the International Paneuropean Union.

She died in August 2008 in Ljubljana and was buried in Žale Cemetery.

== Major works ==
- Changing Patterns of European Family Life (coauthor, New York, 1990).
- Cross Cultural Perspectives on Families, Work, and Change (with Giovanni Sgretta, New York, 1989).
- Ženske in diskriminacija ("Women and Discrimination", coauthor; Ljubljana, 1986).

== See also ==
- Alenka Puhar

== Sources ==
- Article in the daily newspaper Večer
- Article in the journal Demokracija
