= Janez Rakovec =

Slovenian mathematician (1949–2008)

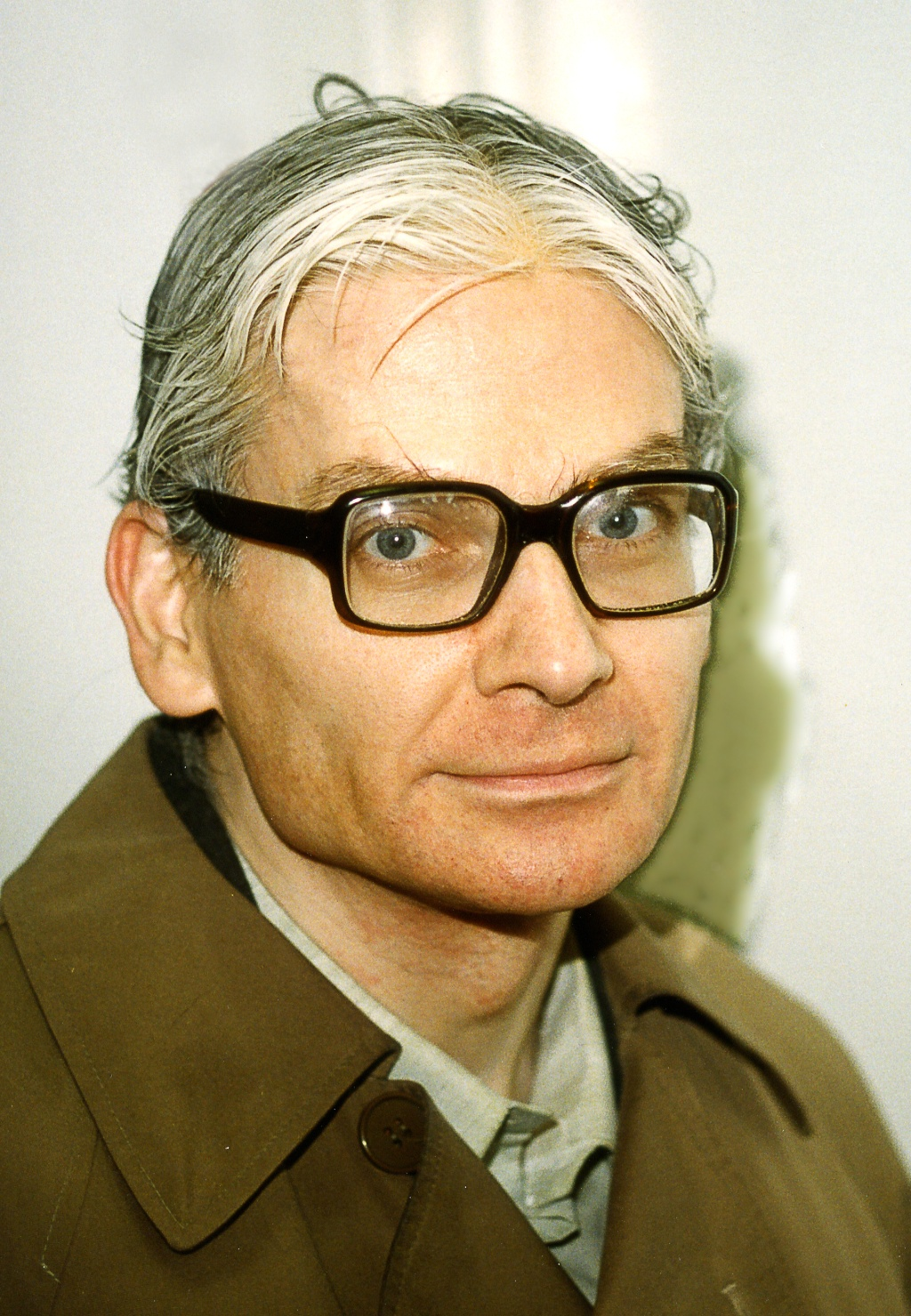
- Rakovec in Ljubljana, 1999
- Born: 22 April 1949; Ljubljana
- Died: 19 October 2008 (aged 59); Ljubljana
- Education: University of Ljubljana
- Known for: mathematics, topology
- Scientific career
- Workplaces: Faculty of Natural Sciences and Technology (FNT), Ljubljana

Janez Rakovec (April 22, 1949 – October 19, 2008) was a Slovenian mathematician.

His principal field of work was topology, mainly 3-manifolds. He worked at the Mathematics Department of the Faculty of Science and Technology, University of Ljubljana; in 1992 he was retired early. His bibliography comprises 73 units.

== Life and work ==
Rakovec was born in Ljubljana to Eva Marija Rakovec, née Štalec, a housewife and to academician Ivan Rakovec, a geologist and paleontologist. He was their only child. After elementary school and high school in Ljubljana, where he graduated in 1968, he enrolled in the Faculty of Natural Sciences and Technology at the University of Ljubljana. In 1972, under the supervision of Jože Vrabec, he graduated from the Mathematics department with the thesis Polyhedral Schoenflies theorem in three-dimensional Euclidean space and received the student Prešeren Prize for this work. In 1975, after completing his post-graduate study in functional analysis, he obtained his master's degree from the same supervisor with the thesis Existence of homeomorphisms between 3-manifolds. In 1979, he obtained his doctorate with the dissertation Surface groups in 3-manifold groups. This time the mentor was Wolfgang H. Heil, visiting professor from the Florida State University.

On definition of a dense set

From October 1971, Rakovec was a demonstrator at the Mathematics department of the Faculty of Natural Sciences and Technology (FNT), and from January 1973 he was employed there full-time as an assistant. Since 1980, he was an assistant professor of mathematical analysis and topology. He taught Set theory and Fundamentals of topology to the students of mathematics, and Mathematics I and Mathematics II to students of pharmacy, textile technology, biology and other majors at the Biotechnical Faculty in Ljubljana.

His basic field was topology, especially 3-manifolds. Besides his work at the University of Ljubljana he also taught at the mathematical seminars of the Society of Mathematicians, Physicists and Astronomers of Slovenia and training courses of the National Education Institute [Zavod Republike Slovenije za šolstvo]. He published two books: Basic Concepts of Topology (1980) and Mathematical Structures. Examples and Solved Problems (1983).

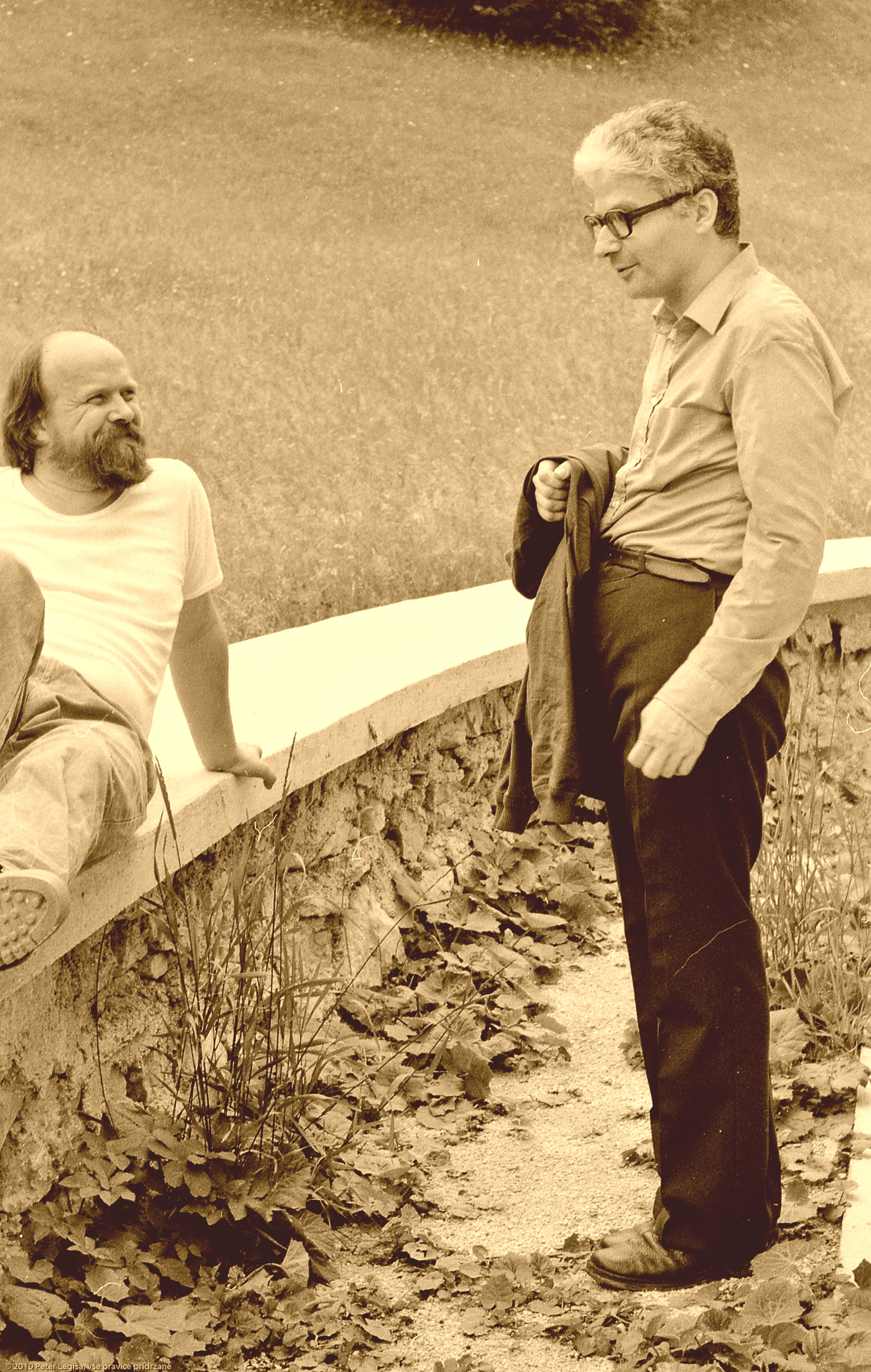
V. Batagelj and J. Rakovec, 1989

== Later years and death ==
In 1992, he had to stop working, also due to poor health and the consequences of an illness from his youth. After the death of his parents, he spent his last years in the Home of Mary and Martha in Logatec.

== Selected works ==
- Osnovni pojmi topologije [Basic concepts of topology]. Državna založba Slovenije, Ljubljana 1980, 248 pp.
- A theorem about almost sufficiently large 3-manifolds, Glasnik matematički. Series 3, 1981, vol. 16(36), no. 1, p. 151-156
- Surface groups in 3-manifold groups (with W. Heil), In: RASSIAS, George M. (ed.). Algebraic and differential topology : global differential geometry. Leipzig: B. G. Teubner, cop. 1984. p. 101-133

== See also ==
- List of Slovenian mathematicians
