= Čadež =

Čadež is a Slovene surname. Notable people with the surname include:

- Andrej Čadež (born 1942), Slovene physicist and astrophysicist
- Boštjan Čadež (born 1979), Slovene intermedia artist
- Luka Čadež (born 1987), Slovene figure skater
- Špela Čadež (born 1977), Slovene animator
