= Denis Trček =

Slovenian professor and computer scientist (born 1963)

- Born: 1963 (age 62–63); Kranj, Slovenia
- Education: University of Ljubljana
- Known for: security and privacy in information systems
- Scientific career
- Fields: Computer science
- Workplaces: University of Ljubljana

Denis Trček (born 1963) is a Slovenian computer scientist and university professor.

Trček graduated in 1988 at the Faculty of Electrical Engineering at the University of Ljubljana, where he received in 1995 also his Ph.D. degree in communication security.

== Career ==
=== Faculty professor ===
After graduation, he took a position first at the Iskra company and then at the Jožef Stefan Institute in Ljubljana. In 2007 he joined the Faculty of Computer and Information Science at the University of Ljubljana where he holds since 2012 a position of a full professor. He is the head of the Laboratory of e-media and of the national research programme Pervasive computing.

=== Scientist ===
In 2002, Trček was a visiting scientist at LMU Munich, and in 2015 at Stanford University in United States as a Fulbright scholar. Trček was or is a member of several national and international technical committees, such as for example the European Network and Information Security Agency (ENISA) and the IFIP working group 11.2 (Pervasive Systems Security). As a visiting lecturer, he took part in many scientific meetings in Europe and USA and gave invited lectures at several universities all over the world.

Trček was professionally involved first in introducing Internet to former Yugoslavia. Later, he started to research security and privacy in computer networks and information systems. On this topic, he published more than a hundred scientific articles and a book with Springer.

== Selected bibliography ==
- Trcek, D. (2006). Managing information systems security and privacy. Springer Science & Business Media.
- Trcek, D. (2011). "Trust management in the pervasive computing era". IEEE Security & Privacy, 9(4), 52-55.
- Trček, D. (2013). "Lightweight protocols and privacy for all-in-silicon objects". Ad hoc networks, 11(5), 1619-1628.
- Trcek, D., & Brodnik, A. (2013). "Hard and soft security provisioning for computationally weak pervasive computing systems in e-health". IEEE wireless communications, 20(4), 22-29.
- Trček, D. (2014). "Qualitative Assessment Dynamics—Complementing Trust Methods For Decision Making". International journal of information technology & decision making, 13(01), 155-173.

== See also ==
- Repository of the University of Ljubljana
- Researchgate.net
- List of University of Ljubljana people
- List of Slovenes
