= Drago Supančič =

Slovenian teacher

Drago Supančič (1903–1964) was a Slovene special-needs teacher.

Supančič worked at the school for the deaf and dumb in Ljubljana. He was a member of the Slovenian Red Cross and he used the position in order to visit Slovenes that had been deported to Serbia during the Second World War. In early November 1943, he traveled to concentration camps in northern Italy to intervene for the release of prisoners held there. He started collaborating with the Liberation Front of the Slovene Nation in 1944. The German authorities arrested him in 1944 and sent him to the Dachau concentration camp.

In the spring of 1947, the Yugoslav authorities arrested him and used him as an incriminating witness in the Nagode Trial, and then released him. In September 1949 he was arrested again and sentenced to a year of forced labor and pretrial custody.
