= Ivan Kuščer =

Slovenian physicist

- Born: 17 June 1918; Vienna, Austria
- Died: 31 January 2000 (aged 81); Ljubljana, Slovenia
- Awards: Boris Kidrič Prize (1963)
- Scientific career
- Fields: transport theory
- Institutions: University of Ljubljana

Ivan Kuščer (17 June 1918 – 31 January 2000) was a Slovenian physicist. He was one of the founders of the school of physics at the University of Ljubljana and a prominent member of the international research group in the field of transport theory, contributing to the theoretical aspects of the diffusion of light, neutron science and dynamics in rarefied gases.

== Teaching ==
Kuščer was associated with the Department of Physics at the University of Ljubljana for over 50 years. He graduated from the university in 1941 with majors in mathematics and chemistry, and a minor in physics, becoming a docent in physics in 1945 and receiving his Ph.D. in 1951. He was elected full professor at the Faculty of Natural Sciences and Technology in 1963. He invested vital effort in developing courses to build up the physics program on a level of established programs abroad. Together with a colleague Anton Moljk, he organized postgraduate studies for physics teachers. The duo authored a series of three textbooks in Slovenian covering basic undergraduate physics concepts; the book series also served as a college textbook due to the comprehensive and precise treatment of the subject. Later Kuščer coauthored two university textbooks, on thermodynamics with S. Žumer, and on mathematical physics with Alojz Kodre, also published in German by Springer.

== Research ==
His early research was on classical radiative transfer using the Boltzmann equation because of his interest in the optics of underwater light fields: this was also the theme of his doctoral dissertation. In later research, he turned to solving classical one-dimensional transport problems for radiative transfer, including polarized light and thermal neutrons, using the Boltzmann equation. In the early 1960s he was a major contributor to the development of the singular eigenfunction method for solving neutral particle transport problems. He moved on to investigate discrete relaxation times in neutron thermalization and relaxation constants of a uniform hard-sphere gas. By the late 1960s and early 1970s he had made important contributions that clarified the interpretation of the accommodation coefficients for rarefied gas-surface interactions.

His research for the next twenty years was primarily in the area of nonequilibrium statistical mechanics in polyatomic gases that culminated in his co-authorship of a two-volume monograph of more than 1000 pages on nonequiIibrium phenomena in polyatomic gases. In 2003, the issue of Transport Theory and Statistical Physics, 32, (3&4) was dedicated to his memory, with extensive obituary by P.F. Zweifel. Four obituaries, covering all aspects of his work, appeared in Annals of Nuclear Energy, and one in Physics Today. In 2001, The 17th International Conference on Transport Theory was dedicated to him. At the home faculty, the graduate lecture hall is named Kuščer seminar, decorated by a sketch by a Slovenian caricaturist Božo Kos.

== Activities ==
At home, he is well known for his pioneering contribution to underwater activities and underwater photography, popularized in a book Sprehodi pod morjem (Undersea walks).

== Visiting appointments and major lectureships ==
- 1963–64: Fulbright-Hays Fellowship at the University of Michigan
- 1964: Brookhaven National Laboratory
- 1965: NATO Transport Theory Summer School, Ankara, Turkey (invited)
- 1966: Queen Mary College, London
- 1968–69: Cornell University
- 1974–75: Sherman Fairchild Scholar at Caltech
- 1977–78: University of Kaiserslautern, Germany

== Professional honors ==
- 1963 National Science Award (Boris Kidrič Prize)
- 1985 Professor Emeritus at the University of Ljubljana
- 1986 Society of Mathematicians, Physicists and Astronomers of Slovenia, honorary member
- 1987 Slovenian Society of Natural Sciences, honorary member
- 1996 honoris causa doctoral degree awarded by the University of Waterloo in Canada
