= Society of Mathematicians, Physicists and Astronomers of Slovenia =

The Society of Mathematicians, Physicists and Astronomers of Slovenia (Slovene: Društvo matematikov, fizikov in astronomov Slovenije, DMFA) is the main Slovene society in the field of mathematics, physics and astronomy.

The Society is occupied with pedagogical activity and with the popularization of mathematics, recreational mathematics, physics, astronomy and with organizing competitions at all levels of education.

It takes care of publicistic and editorial activity, where we should mention its gazette Obzornik za matematiko in fiziko (A Review for Mathematics and Physics), a magazine for secondary schools Presek (A Section), literary collection Sigma and other literary editions.

The current president of the Society is Mojca Vilfan (since 2024) and the vice-president is Ciril Dominko.

The DMFA collaborates with the European Mathematical Society (EMS), the European Physical Society (EPS) and many other related societies around the world.

== Honourable members ==
The Society grants an honourable membership to a person or persons, which have contributed significantly to advance of mathematical and natural sciences in Slovenia, and to development of the Society.

A list of honourable members of the DMFA
#	Name and surname	A year
1.	Josip Plemelj	1949
2.	Lavo Čermelj	1974
3.	Franjo Dominko	1981
4.	Alojzij Vadnal	1984
5.	Jože Povšič	1984
6.	Anton Peterlin	1985
7.	Ivan Štalec	1985
8.	Ivan Kuščer	1986
9.	Anton Moljk	1987
10.	Ivan Vidav	1988
11.	Marija Munda	1991
12.	Peter Gosar	1994
13.	Josip Grasselli	1994
14.	Dušan Modic	1994
15.	Niko Prijatelj	1994
16.	Terezija Uran	1996
17.	Jožica Dolenšek	1999
18.	Darko Jamnik	1999
19.	Martina Koman	2000
20.	Franc Cvelbar	2000
21.	Janez Strnad	2001
22.	Anton Suhadolc	2001
23.	Agata Tiegl	2002
24.	Marija Vencelj	2002
25.	Robert Blinc	2003
26.	Mitja Rosina	2003
27.	Karel Šmigoc	2004
28.	Peter Vencelj	2004
29.	Peter Petek	2005
30.	Zvonko Trontelj	2007
31.	Zlatko Bradač	2010
32.	Milan Hladnik	2012
33.	Izidor Hafner	2014
34.	Andrej Likar	2015
35.	Tomaž Pisanski	2015
36.	Peter Legiša	2017
37.	Duncan Haldane	2019
38.	Vladimir Batagelj	2020
39.	Josip Globevnik	2021
40.	Nada Razpet	2021
41.	Neža Mramor Kosta	2023
42.	Marko Razpet	2025
43.	Dragan Mihailović	2025
