= Pavla Hočevar =

Slovenian teacher (1889–1972)

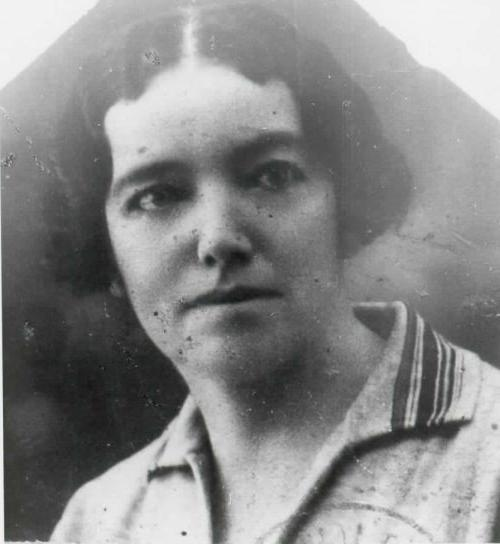
- Born: 27 June 1889; Vienna, Austria-Hungary
- Died: 18 August 1972 (aged 83); Ljubljana, Slovenia
- Occupations: teacher, writer, socialist and suffragist
- Organization(s): Women's Charity Association, Yugoslav Women's Association

Pavla Hočevar (27 June 1889 – 18 August 1972) was a Slovenian teacher, writer, socialist and suffragist. She was a member of the Higher Cultural Council of Slovenian Socialists, the Yugoslav Women's Association and Stara Pravda. She wrote for left wing newspapers Zarja, Njiva and Učiteljski.

== Early life ==
Hočevar was born in Vienna, Austria, in 1889. Her father Franc Hočevar was a chestnut grower in Vienna and a landowner in Male Lašče in Dolenjska, Slovenia.

Hočevar attended school in Velike Lašče and Ljubljana, then secured a scholarship to study at high school and train for a year as a teacher. She began her career teaching in Loški Potok, then in the village of Zagozdac on the Kolpa River.

== Activism ==
Alongside teaching, Hočevar campaigned for women's suffrage. She attended the All-Slavic Women's Congress in Prague in 1907, gave speeches arguing for women's enfranchisement on the basis of equality between women and men, and debated women's inclusion in politics with Boris Ziherl [sl]. She identified with socialism and was a member of the Higher Cultural Council of Slovenian Socialists. She wrote about subjects related to women in the left wing newspapers Zarja, Njiva and Učiteljski.

In 1910, Hočevar moved to Trieste, Italy, where she continued her teaching career. On 8 November 1922, Hočevar was a cofounder of the Women's Charity Association in Trieste, alongside Antonija Slavikova [sl], Milka Mankočeva [sl], Marica Nadlišek Bartol and Milka Martelančeva [sl]. She worked in Italy until Benito Mussolini's government banned and closed down all Slovenian schools, institutions and societies in 1929, then moved back to Slovenia.

After returning to Slovenia, Hočevar was active in the Yugoslav Women's Association and participated as a delegate to congresses in Vienna (1930), Belgrade (1933), Dubrovnik (1936) and Edinburgh (1938). After travelling to Scotland for the congress in Edinburgh, Hočevar wrote about a visit to the British exhibition in Glasgow, concerts, dances, and attending parties.

In 1941, she joined the illegal organization of left-wing liberal intellectuals Stara Pravda. Hočevar was arrested in 1947 for her political activities, and was convicted and imprisoned for espionage alongside 13 other activists at the political show trial known as the Nagode Trial. She was sentenced to 14 years in prison, but was conditionally released on 9 May 1952.

== Later life and death ==
After her release from prison, Hočevar wrote her memoirs, which were published in 1969. The memoirs include her thoughts on the rise of Fascism in Italy and the impact this had on the intelligentsia.

Hočevar died on 18 August 1972 in Ljubljana.
