= Franc Reyes =

Franc or Frank Reyes may refer to:

- Franc Reyes (film director), American film director
- Franc Reyes (illustrator), Filipino illustrator and comic strip artist
- Frank Reyes (born 1969), born Francisco López Reyes, bachata artist
- Franc Reyes, songwriter "Never Say Never" and "Together Forever"

== See also ==
- Frank Reys (c.1931–1984), Aboriginal Australian jockey
- Francisco Reyes (disambiguation)
