= Izidor Cankar =

Slovenian author, art historian, diplomat, journalist, translator and politician

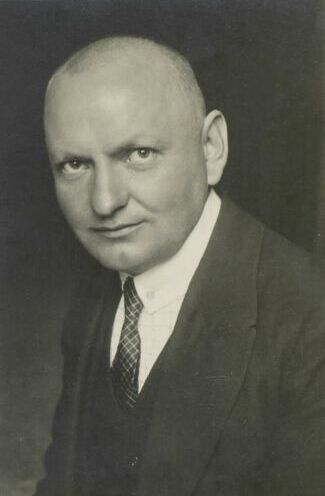
Izidor Cankar in the 1920s

Izidor Cankar (22 April 1886 – 22 September 1958) was a Slovenian author, art historian, diplomat, journalist, translator, and liberal conservative politician. He was one of the most important Slovenian art historians of the first part of the 20th century, and one of the most influential cultural figures in interwar Slovenia.

== Early life ==
Izidor Cankar was born in Šid, in what was then the Austro-Hungarian Kingdom of Croatia-Slavonia (now part of the Serbian province of Vojvodina). His father, Andrej Cankar, was a Slovene tradesman from Inner Carniola, while his mother, Marija Huber, was from a mixed Danube Swabian–Croat family. Izidor was a cousin of the famous writer Ivan Cankar. At the age of seven, his father went bankrupt. Young Izidor was taken into foster care by his aunt Karolina Hofberg. Cankar grew up in a multicultural environment, and spoke Croatian, German, and Hungarian from a young age. He attended Croatian-language schools, and throughout his life he claimed his Croatian was better than his Slovene. In 1897, his cousins Ivan and Karlo Cankar convinced him to move to Ljubljana, where he attended the Classical Lyceum. In 1905, after finishing high school, he decided to become a priest and enrolled in the Roman Catholic seminary in Ljubljana. There, he met the theologian Andrej Kalan, who had a decisive influence on Cankar's future intellectual development.

After finishing the study of theology in Ljubljana in 1909, he enrolled in the University of Louvain, where he studied esthetics. During this period, he also spent time in London and in Paris. In 1910, he enrolled in the University of Graz, where he studied philosophy. In 1913, he obtained a PhD in art history at the University of Vienna with a thesis on the Italian baroque painter Giulio Quaglio, which he wrote under the supervision of the Slovene art historian France Stele. The same year he returned to Ljubljana, where he became the editor of the Catholic journal Dom in svet, transforming it into the most prestigious literary magazine in the Slovene Lands. Between 1918 and 1919, he worked as the chief editor of the conservative daily Slovenec, the most widespread Slovenian newspaper of the time. During the same period, he became active in the Slovene People's Party, taking part in the negotiations for the unification of the State of Slovenes, Croats and Serbs with the Kingdom of Serbia.

After the formation of a unified Yugoslav state, he continued his studies in Vienna under Max Dvořák. In 1920, he returned to Ljubljana, where he became the director of the newly established Slovenian National Gallery. In 1923, he became a professor at the University of Ljubljana. During the same period, he decided to leave the priesthood. He did so in 1926, and married Ana Hribar, who came from a wealthy Ljubljana family. His departure from the priesthood and the Catholic Church and subsequent marriage surprised and outraged Ljubljana.

In 1933, he founded the Slovenian section of the International P.E.N., and he served as its first president until 1935. In May 1933, during the 11th congress of the international P.E.N. Club in Dubrovnik, Cankar voted for the expulsion of pro-Nazi writers from the organization, in contrast to the Croatian and Serbian representatives. At the same time, he became a close friend of the Yugoslav sculptor Ivan Meštrović and served as the godfather of his second daughter. In the late 1930s, he convinced his wife's family to donate money for the construction of the Museum of Modern Art in Ljubljana, of which he served as supervisor.

== Diplomatic and political career ==
In 1936, Cankar was named Yugoslav ambassador to Argentina. He was in Buenos Aires during the Axis invasion of Yugoslavia in April 1941. In 1942, the Yugoslav government in exile named him ambassador to Canada. In 1944, he resigned in protest against the policies of Prime Minister Božidar Purić, who continued to support the Serbian Chetnik resistance movement of Draža Mihajlović even after claims of his collaboration with the Nazi Germans in the fight against Tito's Partisans. Canadian Prime Minister Mackenzie King offered him a post in the Canadian foreign service, but Cankar declined. After the Treaty of Vis was signed between the newly appointed Yugoslav Prime Minister in exile Ivan Šubašić and the Yugoslav communist resistance leader Josip Broz Tito in June 1944, Cankar was named Minister of Culture and Telecommunications in the new coalition government. However, he resigned in autumn of the same year after failing to convince the leadership of the Slovene People's Party to recognize the Liberation Front of the Slovenian People and join forces with the Yugoslav Partisans.

In February 1945, he went to liberated Belgrade and was named ambassador to Greece. In 1947, he returned to Ljubljana, where he worked as a consultant for the National Gallery and the Museum of Modern Art. He was critical of the communist regime, but did not engage in any political action. In 1953, he became a member of the Slovenian Academy of Sciences and Arts. He died in Ljubljana in 1958, age 72, and was buried in Žale Cemetery.

== Writing ==
In his early years, Cankar wrote several renowned essays, mostly related to esthetic issues. In 1911, he published the book Obiski (Encounters), a collection of interviews with contemporary Slovene authors and artists (Ivan Cankar, Rihard Jakopič, Fran Saleški Finžgar, Ivan Tavčar, Oton Župančič, Franc Ksaver Meško, and others). In 1913, he wrote his only major literary work, the essayistic novel, S poti (On the Way), written as a travelogue through Italy.

In 1926, Cankar published a major treatise in art history, Uvod v umevanje likovne umetnosti (An Introduction to the Understanding of Figurative Art), where he developed a systematic stylistic typology based on the theories of Heinrich Wölfflin. In the same year, he started publishing his magnum opus, Zgodovina likovne umetnosti v zahodni Evropi (History of Figurative Art in Western Europe), in which he applied his own esthetic theory in the overview of western art between late antiquity and the Renaissance. Between 1926 and 1936, he published the first critical edition of collected works of the writer Ivan Cankar, his cousin. In 1948, he also published Ivan Cankar's correspondence.

Izidor Cankar was also a translator: among other, he translated works of Jonathan Swift, Patrick Augustine Sheehan, André Maurois and Immanuel Kant.

== Publications ==
- Cankar Iz. S poti. Ljubljana: Nova knjižnica / Nova založba, 1919. 3, 117 s.; Z cesty // Návštěvy. Sv. 5. Eva, 1921. 131 s. (czech); 2nd ed. Ljubljana: Mladinska knjiga, 1996. 252 s.
- Cankar Iz. Uvod v umevanje likovne umetnosti. Sistematika stila. Izdaja 3.,. V Ljubljani: Karantanija, 1995. 185 s.
- Cankar Iz. Obisk na Rožniku In: Ivan Cankar, slovenski pisatelj: (1876-1918). Ljubljana: Mestni muzej, 1956.

Translations

- Lewis S. Babbitt / prevedel Izidor Cankar. Ljubljana : Državna založba Slovenije, 1953. 362 s.
- Swift J. Guliverjeva potovanja / prevedel Izidor Cankar. Ljubljana : Cankarjeva založba, 1967. 335 s.

== See also ==
- Alojzij Kuhar
- Boris Furlan
- Miha Krek
