= Dachau trials (Slovenia) =

The Dachau trials (Slovene: Dachauski procesi) were a group of show trials held between 1947 and 1949 in FPR Yugoslavia, mostly in PR Slovenia. The name refers to the fact that 31 of the defendants had been prisoners at the Dachau concentration camp. Thirty seven people were sentenced, 15 of them to death, 10 of whom were executed. All sentences were reversed in April 1986.

== Background and procedure ==
The trials marked a departure from previous communist show trials in Slovenia such as the Nagode Trial because until this point the authorities had sought enemies outside the Communist Party, among the non-proletariat and the non-communist intelligentsia. By selecting enemies from the ranks of the Communist Party, a Yugoslav version of the Stalinist show trials was launched.

In the preparations for the trials, a large number of writers, physicians, politicians, and engineers were arrested without knowing whether they would be accused or merely used as witnesses. Those arrested were tortured and deprived of their legal rights. Forged documents were prepared as evidence against them and false testimony was prepared.

The defendants in the trials were forced to confess to being Nazi spies while imprisoned at the Dachau concentration camp, collaborating with the Gestapo, and working for Western powers after the Second World War in order to undermine socialism. The proceedings were broadcast to the public via special loudspeakers on the streets. Most of the defendants were shot immediately after being condemned to death, and others were sent to the Goli Otok prison camp. The total number of people executed, the specific dates when they were killed, and where their bodies were disposed of remains unknown. Some are believed to lie in the forest near Kočevje, and others in Ljubljana's Žale cemetery.

The sentences handed down in the trials were reversed in April 1986 at the Tenth Congress of the League of Communists of Slovenia.

== List of trials ==
- Preliminary trial: the trial of Janko Pufler (May 24, 1947)
- First Dachau Trial: the trial of Branko Diehl and Stane Oswald (April 21–26, 1948)
- Second Dachau Trial: the trial of Jože Mavec and Franc Malenšek (May 12, 1948)
- Third Dachau Trial: the trial of Mitja Sark (May 22, 1948)
- Fourth Dachau Trial: the trial of Franc Žumer and Alojz Veršnik (May 26, 1948)
- Fifth Dachau Trial: the trial of Janko Ravnikar (July 20, 1948)
- Sixth Dachau Trial: the trial of Vlasto (Vladimir) Kopač, Andrej Bohinc, Viljem Brezar, and Roman Vidmar (August 10, 1948)
- Seventh Dachau Trial: the trial of Rezika Barle (August 18, 1948)
- Eighth Dachau Trial: the trial of Vekoslav Figar and Ivan Ranzinger (June 29, 1949)
- Ninth Dachau Trial: the trial of Jože Marčan (September 20, 1949)
- Tenth Dachau Trial: the trial of Boris Fakin (Igor Torkar), Ludvik Mrzel, and Marjan Petrak (October 11, 1949)

== Overview ==
- The proceedings involved 7,380 Slovenes and 2,144 foreign citizens.
- 37 people were sentenced, 15 of them to be shot to death, four of whom were not executed.
- 10 people were shot (either on May 12, 1948 and January 5, 1949, or on November 18, 1950, probably in the forest near Kočevje).
- 20 people were sentenced to forced labor, one of whom died at the Goli Otok prison camp.
- The judicial investigation against three people was suspended.
- Three people died during interrogations.
- Investigators: Lieutenant Colonel Ivan More (a.k.a. Žan; head), Kamilo Hilbert, Branko Ivanuš, Nace Majcen, Martin Renko, Franc Pirkovič, Karlo Sagadin, Rado Škraba, Aleks Winkler.

== Sources ==
- Dachauski procesi, Ljubljana, 1990. electronic edition at the SiStory website (in Slovene)

== See also ==
- Nagode Trial
