= Peter Vodopivec =

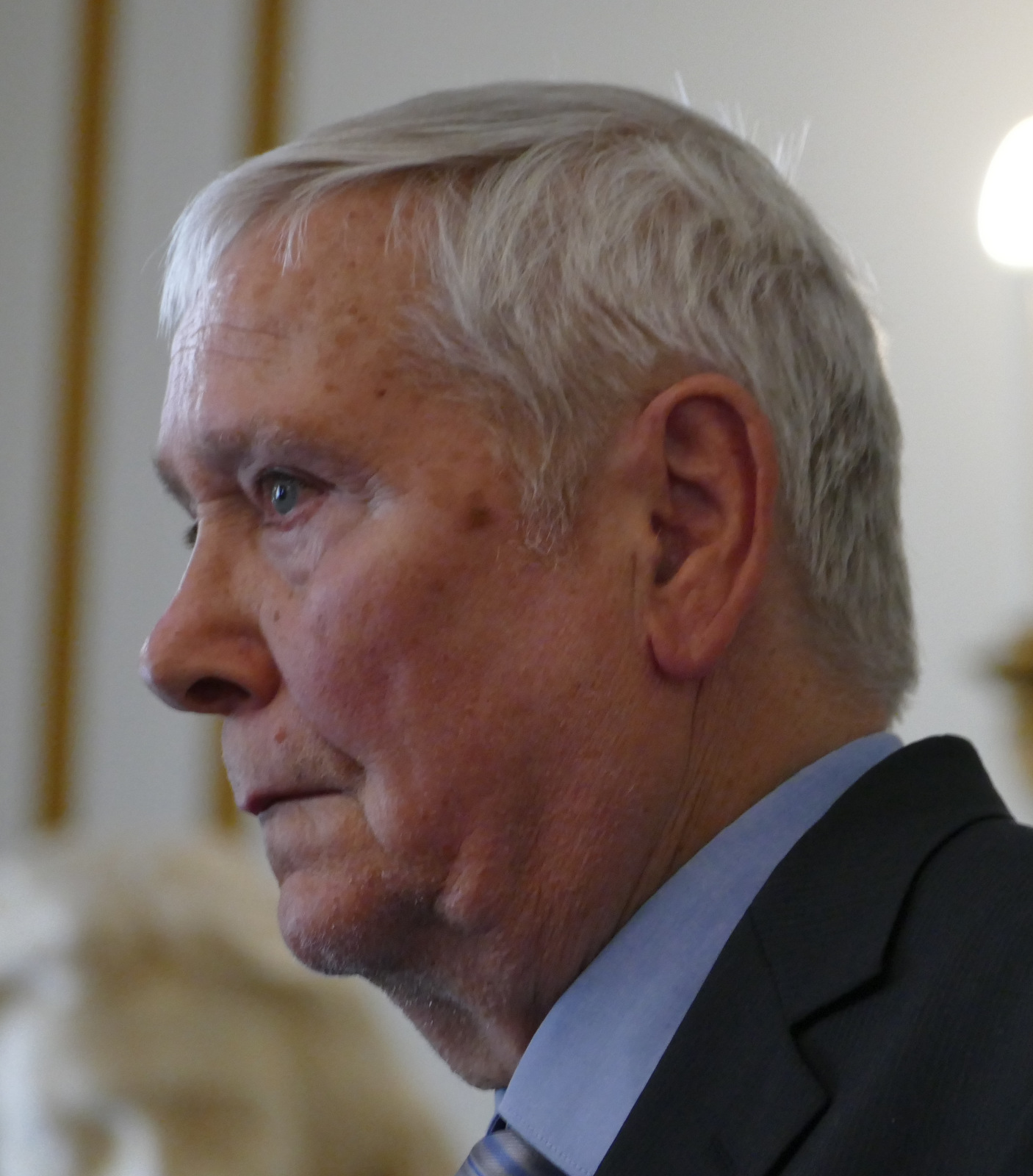
Peter Vodopivec

Peter Vodopivec (born 7 July 1946) is a Slovenian historian and public intellectual.

He was born in a Slovene family in Belgrade, Serbia, then capital of the Socialist Federal Republic of Yugoslavia. He studied History, Comparative Literature and Sociology at the University of Ljubljana. He received a PhD in History in 1978 with his thesis "Middle Class Social and Economic Ideas in Inner-Austria in Pre-March period", and afterwards worked as a researcher on the Age of Enlightenment in France and in the United States.

During the late 1960s, he was active in the student movement in Slovenia. In the 1980s, he was one of the co-founders of the alternative journal Nova revija. In 1989, he was among the founding members of the Slovenian Democratic Union. After 1992, he left politics and dedicated himself to scholarly work.

He was Professor of Modern European and American History at the University of Ljubljana from 1980 to 1999.

Since 1999 he has been a senior research fellow at the Institute for Modern History in Ljubljana.

== Bibliography ==
- Les Slovènes et la France (1914–1920) ("The Slovenes and France". Paris: 1983);
- "Intellectuals and power in the former Yugoslavia". Quadrant. 40 (7–8 [328]): 41–44. July–August 1996.
- Slovenes and Yugoslavia : 1918–1991 (Berkeley, CA: 1992);
- The Serbs and Croats; their images from a Slovene historical perspective (Ljubljana - New York: 1993);
- Usoda slovenskih demokratičnih izobražencev: Angela Vode in Boris Furlan, žrtvi Nagodetovega procesa ("The Fate of the Slovenian Democratic Intelligentsia: Angela Vode and Boris Furlan, Victims of the Nagode Trial". Ljubljana, 2001).
- O gospodarskih in socialnih nazorih na Slovenskem v 19. stoletju ("Economic and Social Theories in 19th Century Slovene Lands". Ljubljana: 2006);
- Od Pohlinove slovnice do samostojne države: slovenska zgodovina od konca 18. stoletja do konca 20. stoletja (From Pohlin's Grammar Book to an Independent State: Slovene History from Late 18th to Late 20th Century". Ljubljana: 2006);
- Slowenische Geschichte: Gesellschaft - Politik - Kultur ("Slovene History: Society - Politics - Culture". Graz: 2008), with Vasko Simoniti and Peter Štih.
