= Angela Vode =

Slovenian human rights activist (1892–1985)

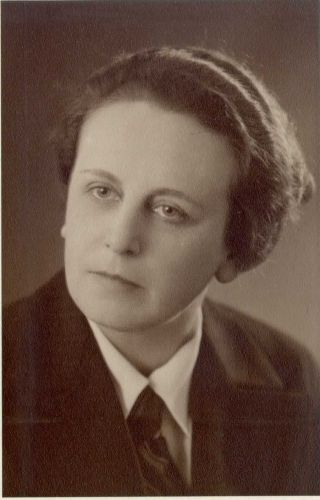
Angela Vode in 1939

Angela Vode (Slovene pronunciation: [aŋˈɡeːla ʋɔˈdeː]; 5 January 1892 – 5 May 1985) was a Slovenian pedagogue, feminist author and human rights activist. An early member of the Communist Party of Yugoslavia, she was expelled from the Party in 1939 because of criticism against the Hitler-Stalin Pact. During World War II, she joined the Liberation Front of the Slovenian People, but was expelled in 1942 because of disagreements with the Communist Party of Slovenia. In 1944, she was interned in a Nazi concentration camp. After the war, she was arrested by the Yugoslav communist authorities, trialed at the Nagode Trial and imprisoned for several years. After her release from prison, she was excluded from public life for the rest of her life.

== Early life ==
Angela Vode was born in Ljubljana, in what was then the Austro-Hungarian Empire. After graduating from the teachers college in Ljubljana in 1912, she worked as a teacher in several schools.

In 1921, she undertook specialization in teaching mentally disabled children. For the next 25 years, she worked as a teacher-defectologist. She published several articles on education of handicapped children, and in 1936 she published a book on the subject, entitled The Importance of Auxiliary Schools and Their Development in Yugoslavia (Pomen pomožnega šolstva in njegov razvoj v Jugoslaviji).

Vode was one of the first women's rights activists in Slovenia, and one of the first organizers of human rights groups. In the interwar period, she was elected president of the Women's Movement of Yugoslavia and president of Female Teachers' Society of Slovenia. She published numerous texts dealing with social injustice and women's rights. Some of her most important books are The Woman in the Contemporary World (Žena v sedanjem svetu, 1934), The Woman and Fascism (Žena i fašizam, 1935, written in Serbocroatian language). Her most important theoretical work was Gender and Destiny (Spol in usoda), published in 1938.

Active in a number of women's organizations, Vode served as president of the Union of Working Women and Girls (Slovene: Zveza delavskih žena in deklet) and was a member of the Balkan regional association, Little Entente of Women (LEW). Between 1927 and 1937, she served as president of the Slovenian Women’s Movement (Slovene: Ženski pokret), which she had helped found the year prior to serving as executive. Between 1929 and 1934, during King Alexander's reign, associations were frequently banned and members recreated them with a different registered name. Because of this, Vode has association with a large number of organizations in the interwar period as well as having participated in several conferences, like the 1927 Prague Conference of LEW; the 1929 Berlin Conference of the International Woman Suffrage Alliance, and the 1936 Dubrovnick conference of the International Council of Women.

In 1922, she joined the illegal Communist Party of Yugoslavia. She referred to this decision as an act of idealism, sprung from a sincere belief in the fight against injustice and support for the weak. She saw communism as an ideal of social and political emancipation, which would have included the full equality of the Slovene people in the Yugoslavia and the autonomy of Slovenia in a de-centralized federation.

Besides Slovene, Angela Vode was fluent in German, English, French and Serbo-Croatian, and she also spoke Italian and some Russian.

== The conflict with the Communist Party and World War II ==
In 1939, Vode sharply criticized the Molotov–Ribbentrop Pact, which led to her exclusion from the Communist Party.

After the Axis invasion of Yugoslavia in early April 1941, Vode urged for a united anti-Fascist front, criticising Slovene communists who had been supporting Stalin's collaboration with Hitler. In spite of her conflict with the Communist Party, Vode joined the Communist-led Liberation Front of the Slovenian People after the Nazi German attack on the Soviet Union in June 1941, when the Yugoslav Communists decided to launch an armed struggle against the Axis occupation forces. Vode became one of the members of Supreme Plenum of the Liberation Front of the Slovenian People as a representative of Slovene women's movements. In late 1941, she joined the group Stara Pravda ("Old Justice") led by the left wing activist Črtomir Nagode. In 1942, Nagode's group was expelled from the Liberation Front because of constant disagreements with Slovene Communists.

After her expulsion from the underground resistance movement, Vode continued with charity on her own hand. While life was difficult in the Italian-occupied Province of Ljubljana, matters were even worse in the German-occupied part of Slovenia. In the Province of Ljubljana, there were many Slovene refugees that fled the German-occupied zone, in order to escape the brutal anti-Slovene policies of Nazi Germany. Vode organized aid for these refugees. In 1942, the Italian occupation forces started executing hostages in the Province of Ljubljana. Vode wrote a petition to Benito Mussolini and started collecting signatures, trying to save the lives of the hostages. The Slovene Communist organization prevented her from collecting signatures and destroyed the petition. This was apparently done so that the Communist organization could maintain its position as the only viable force fighting the occupation forces in Slovenia - a key element in legitimating the Communist takeover of power after the war. In spring of 1943, Vode was arrested by the Italian Fascist authorities, and spent several weeks in jail. In January 1944, she was arrested by the Germans and sent to Ravensbrück concentration camp. She returned home after several months, in late autumn 1944, exhausted but alive.

== Persecution under Communism ==
After World War II, she continued to work as a teacher. In 1947, she was arrested by the Communist Yugoslav secret police, imprisoned, and tortured for two months. In autumn of 1947, she was put to trial at the Nagode Trial, a show trial organized against several renowned Slovene pro-Western politicians and activists. All of them were accused of being enemies of the working class, agents of capitalism, western spies, etc. They were all sentenced to death or long term imprisonment and cancellation of all rights.

Vode was accused of "writing an extensive spy report on the political and economic situation in Slovenia in which she defamed the authorities, and intended to present this report to a representative of the American Red Cross in Yugoslavia". She was sentenced to 20 years of imprisonment and cancellation of all rights for further five years. She was released after six years, probably due to the external pressures of international organizations on Tito's Yugoslavia.

After her release from prison, Vode became a non-person, that is a person without any rights. She was not allowed to look for an employment or to have a personal income. She was entitled neither to medical insurance nor social care. She also could not obtain a passport, making it impossible to leave Yugoslavia legally. Her name was prohibited in public: she was prevented from publishing, while her works could not be quoted in other books or articles. For several years, her livelihood completely dependent on her sister, Ivanka Špindler. She was finally issued a passport in the mid-1970s. Her first public appearance occurred in the mid-1980s, shortly before her death, when she gave an interview for the alternative journal Nova revija.

She died in Ljubljana in 1985.

== The Hidden Memoir ==
In the late 1960s, Vode started writing her autobiography, in secret. She completed the manuscript in 1971, and entitled it Skriti spomin or The Hidden Memoir. The text in fact remained hidden for the next 30 years. She instructed her nephew Janez Špindler (who lived abroad) to publish the book at an appropriate time in the future. In the 1990s, the manuscript was given to the renowned author, journalist and historian Alenka Puhar who edited it. It was published in 2004 by the publishing house Nova Revija.

The book is divided into three parts. In the first part, Vode describes the time of war from her personal viewpoint. She depicts her clashes with the Slovenian Communists, who treated her war efforts to help Slovene women as an act of collaboration with the occupying forces. In the second part, she depicts her imprisonment including interrogations and torture. She then describes her life without the basic human rights, which she defines as "a life of an alleviated and diluted variant". In the third part, Vode evaluates the Yugoslav Communist system. She analyzes the Slovene and Yugoslav Communist regime as a semi-totalitarian society, where a ruling elite misleads the people with lies, promising them a better future, but in fact only satisfying their own greed.

In 2008, TV Slovenia produced the film The Hidden Memory of Angela Vode, based on the second part of Vode's manuscript.

== Sources ==
- Peter Vodopivec, Usoda slovenskih demokratičnih izobražencev: Angela Vode in Boris Furlan, žrtvi Nagodetovega procesa ('The Fate of the Slovenian Democratic Intelligentsia: Angela Vode and Boris Furlan, Victims of the Nagode Trial'; Ljubljana: Slovenska matica, 2001).
