= Janko Pleterski =

Slovenian politician and academic (1923–2018)

Member of the Presidential Council of the Socialist Republic of Slovenia
- In office 1988–1990

Personal details
- Born: 1 February 1923 Maribor, Slovenia
- Died: 8 June 2018 (aged 95)
- Party: Communist Party of Slovenia
- Education: University of Ljubljana

Janko Pleterski (1 February 1923 – 8 June 2018) was a Slovenian historian, politician and diplomat. He was the father of the historian and archeologist Andrej Pleterski.

== Life ==
Pleterski was born on 1 February 1923 in Maribor, Slovenia, then part of the Kingdom of Serbs, Croats and Slovenes. He attended high school in Ljubljana. In August 1941, he was arrested by the Fascist authorities of the Italian-occupied Province of Ljubljana and imprisoned in Alessandria, Italy. After the Italian armistice in September 1943, he returned to Ljubljana. In July 1944, he joined the partisan resistance. After the end of World War II, he worked at the Yugoslav foreign ministry in Belgrade as an expert on border issues with Italy and Austria.

In 1953, Pleterski became a researcher at the Institute for Ethnic Studies in Ljubljana. In 1963, he obtained a PhD in modern history at the University of Ljubljana, where from 1970 to 1982 he taught modern political history of Slovenes and South Slavs. Between 1988 and 1990, Pleterski was member of the Presidential Council of the Socialist Republic of Slovenia, as part of the reformist circle of the Communist Party of Slovenia around Milan Kučan and Janez Stanovnik who negotiated with the opposition for a gradual democratisation of Slovenia. In 1989, he became a member of the Slovenian Academy of Sciences and Arts.

== Works ==
Pleterski wrote extensively on the Slovene history of late 19th and early 20th century, with an emphasis on the history of Carinthian Slovenes, and on the relations between Slovenes and other Yugoslav peoples.
