= Josip Plemelj =

Slovenian mathematician (1873–1967)

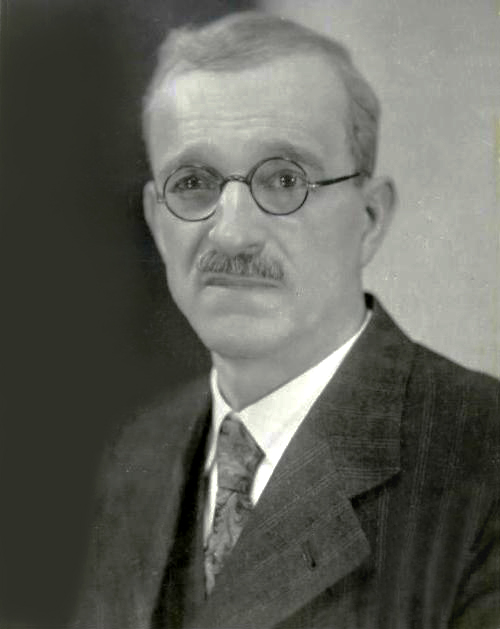
- Josip Plemelj in 1920
- Born: December 11, 1873; Bled, Austria-Hungary
- Died: May 22, 1967 (aged 93); Ljubljana, Socialist Republic of Slovenia
- Education: University of Vienna (PhD, 1898)
- Known for: Sokhotski–Plemelj theorem
- Scientific career
- Doctoral students: Ivan Vidav

Josip Plemelj (December 11, 1873 – May 22, 1967) was a Slovene mathematician, whose main contributions were to the theory of analytic functions and the application of integral equations to potential theory. He was the first chancellor of the University of Ljubljana.

== Life ==
Plemelj was born in the village of Bled near Bled Castle in Austria-Hungary (now Slovenia); he died in Ljubljana, Yugoslavia (now Slovenia). His father, Urban, a carpenter and crofter, died when Josip was only a year old. His mother Marija, née Mrak, found bringing up the family alone very hard, but she was able to send her son to school in Ljubljana, where Plemelj studied from 1886 to 1894. Due to a bench thrown into Tivoli Pond by him or his friends, he could not attend the school after he finished the fourth class and had to pass the final exam privately. After leaving and obtaining the necessary examination results he went to the University of Vienna in 1894 where he had applied to Faculty of Arts to study mathematics, physics and astronomy. His professors in Vienna were von Escherich for mathematical analysis, Gegenbauer and Mertens for arithmetic and algebra, Weiss for astronomy, Stefan's student Boltzmann for physics.

In May 1898, Plemelj presented his doctoral thesis under Escherich's tutelage entitled Über lineare homogene Differentialgleichungen mit eindeutigen periodischen Koeffizienten (Linear Homogeneous Differential Equations with Uniform Periodical Coefficients). He continued with his study in Berlin (1899/1900) under the German mathematicians Frobenius and Fuchs and in Göttingen (1900/1901) under Klein and Hilbert.

In April 1902 he became a private senior lecturer at the University of Vienna. In 1906, he was appointed assistant at the Technical University of Vienna. In 1907, he became associate professor and in 1908 full professor of mathematics at the University of Chernivtsi (Ukrainian: Чернівці, Russian: Черновцы), Ukraine. From 1912 to 1913 he was dean of this faculty. In 1917, his political views led him to be forcibly ejected by the government and resettled in Moravia. After the First World War he became a member of the University Commission under the Slovene Provincial Government and helped establish the first Slovene university at Ljubljana, and was elected its first chancellor. In the same year he was appointed professor of mathematics at the Faculty of Arts. After the Second World War he joined the Faculty of Natural Science and Technology (FNT). He retired in 1957 after having lectured in mathematics for 40 years.

== Earliest contributions ==
Plemelj had shown his great gift for mathematics early in elementary school. He mastered the whole of the high school syllabus by the beginning of the fourth year and began to tutor students for their graduation examinations. At that time he discovered alone series for sin x and cos x. Actually he found a series for cyclometric function arccos x and after that he just inverted this series and then guessed a principle for coefficients. Yet he did not have a proof for that.

Plemelj had great joy for a difficult constructional tasks from geometry. From his high school days originates an elementary problem — his later construction of regular sevenfold polygon inscribed in a circle otherwise exactly and not approximately with simple solution as an angle trisection which was yet not known in those days and which necessarily leads to the old Indian or Babylonian approximate construction. He started to occupy himself with mathematics in fourth and fifth class of high school. Beside in mathematics he was interested also in natural science and especially astronomy. He studied celestial mechanics already at high school. He liked observing the stars. His eyesight was so sharp he could see the planet Venus even in the daytime.

== Research ==
Plemelj's main research interests were the theory of linear differential equations, integral equations, potential theory, the theory of analytic functions, and functional analysis. Plemelj encountered integral equations while still a student at Göttingen, when the Swedish professor Erik Holmgren gave a lecture on the work of his fellow countryman Fredholm on linear integral equations of the 1st and 2nd kind. Spurred on by Hilbert, Göttingen mathematicians attacked this new area of research and Plemelj was one of the first to publish original results on the question, applying the theory of integral equations to the study of harmonic functions in potential theory.

His most important work in potential theory is summarised in his 1911 book Potentialtheoretische Untersuchungen (Studies in Potential Theory), which received the Jablonowski Society award in Leipzig (1500 marks), and the Richard Lieben award from the University of Vienna (2000 crowns) for the most outstanding work in the field of pure and applied mathematics written by any kind of 'Austrian' mathematician in the previous three years.

His most original contribution is the elementary solution he provided for the Riemann–Hilbert problem f_{+} = g f_{−} about the existence of a differential equation with given monodromy group. The solution, published in his 1908 article "Riemannian classes of functions with given monodromy group", rests on three formulas that now carry his name, which connect the values taken by a holomorphic function at the boundary of an arc Γ:

$$f_+(z)={1\over2i\pi} \int_\Gamma{\phi(t)-\phi(z)\over{t-z}}\, dt
+ \phi(z)$$

$$f(z)={1\over2i\pi} \int_\Gamma{\phi(t)-\phi(z)\over{t-z}}\, dt
+ {1\over2} \phi(z)$$

$$f_-(z)={1\over2i\pi} \int_\Gamma {\phi(t)-\phi(z)\over{t-z}}\, dt
\quad z\in\Gamma$$

These formulas are variously called the Plemelj formulae, the Sokhotsky-Plemelj formulae, or sometimes (mainly in German literature) the Plemelj-Sokhotsky Formulae, after the Polish mathematician Julian Sochocki (1842–1927).

Based on his methods of solving the Riemann problem he had developed the theory of singular integral equations (MSC (2000) 45-Exx) which was used above all by the Russian school at the head of Nikoloz Muskhelishvili (Николай Иванович Мусхелишвили) (1891–1976).

Plemelj contributed significantly to the theory of analytic functions in solving the problem of uniformization of algebraic functions, contributions on formulation of the theorem of analytic extension of designs and treatises in algebra and in number theory.

In 1912, Plemelj published a very simple proof of the special case of Fermat's Last Theorem where the exponent, n, is 5. More difficult proofs of this case were first provided by Dirichlet in 1828 and Legendre in 1830.

His arrival in Ljubljana in 1919 was seminal for the development of mathematics in Slovenia. As a good teacher he had raised several generations of mathematicians and engineers. His most famous student is Ivan Vidav. After the Second World War Slovenska akademija znanosti in umetnosti (Slovene Academy of Sciences and Arts) (SAZU) had published his three-year course of lectures for students of mathematics: Teorija analitičnih funkcij (The Theory of Analytic Functions), (SAZU, Ljubljana 1953, pp XVI+516), Diferencialne in integralske enačbe. Teorija in uporaba (Differential and Integral Equations. Theory and Application).

Plemelj found a formula for a sum of normal derivatives of one-layered potential in the internal or external region. He was pleased also with algebra and number theory, but he had published only few contributions from these fields – for example a book entitled Algebra in teorija števil (Algebra and Number Theory; SAZU, Ljubljana 1962, pp. xiv + 278) which was published abroad as his last work Problemi v smislu Riemanna in Kleina (Problems in the Sense of Riemann and Klein; edition and translation by J. R. M. Radok, "Interscience Tract in Pure and Applied Mathematics", No. 16, Interscience Publishers: John Wiley & Sons, New York, London, Sydney 1964, pp VII+175). This work deals with questions which were of his most interests and examinations. His bibliography includes 33 units, from which 30 are scientific treatises and had been published among the others in a magazines such as: Monatshefte für Mathematik und Physik, "Sitzungsberichte der kaiserlichen Akademie der Wissenschaften"; in Vienna, "Jahresbericht der deutschen Mathematikervereinigung", "gdnae.de" in Verhandlungen, "Bulletin des Sciences Mathematiques", "Obzornik za matematiko in fiziko" and "Publications mathematiques de l'Universite de Belgrade". When French mathematician Charles Émile Picard denoted Plemelj's works as "deux excellents memoires", Plemelj became known in the mathematical world.

Plemelj was a regular member of the SAZU since its foundation in 1938, corresponding member of the JAZU (Yugoslav Academy of Sciences and Arts) in Zagreb, Croatia since 1923, corresponding member of the SANU (Serbian Academy of Sciences and Arts) in Belgrade since 1930 (1931). In 1954, he received the highest award for research in Slovenia, the Prešeren award. The same year he was elected for corresponding member of the Bavarian Academy of Sciences in Munich.

In 1963, for his 90th anniversary, University of Ljubljana granted him title of the honorary doctor. Plemelj was first teacher of mathematics at Slovene university and 1949 became first honorary member of the ZDMFAJ (Yugoslav Union of Societies of Mathematicians, Physicists, and Astronomers). He left his villa in Bled to the DMFA, where today is his memorial room.

Plemelj did not do extra preparation for lectures; he didn't have any notes. He used to say that he thought over the lecture subject on the way from his home in Gradišče to the university. Students are said to have got the impression that he was creating teaching material on the spot and that they were witnessing the formation of something new. He was writing formulae on the table beautifully although they were composited from Greek, Latin or Gothic letters. He requested the same from students. They had to write distinctly.

Plemelj had a very refined ear for languages and created a solid base for the development of Slovene mathematical terminology. He had accustomed students for a clear and logical phraseology. For example, he would become angry if they used the word rabiti 'to use' instead of the word potrebovati 'to need'. For this reason he said: "The engineer who does not know mathematics never needs it. But if he knows it, he uses it frequently."

== See also ==
- List of Slovenes
- Slovene mathematicians
- Hilbert's twenty-first problem

== Sources ==
- Josip Plemelj, "Iz mojega življenja in dela" (From My Life and Work) - in Slovenian, Obzornik mat. fiz. 39 (1992) pp. 188–192.
