= Caroline Franc =

French journalist, writer and screenwriter

Caroline Franc, also known as Caroline Desages, is a French journalist, writer and screenwriter, born in 1971.

== Biography ==
After training as a journalist at the Centre de formation des journalistes de Paris, she first worked at AEF info, where she focused particularly on higher education.

From 2007, she writes practical books on everyday life for Hachette Editions. She is the editor of the blog Pensées de rondes and from it has drawn the show Dans la peau d'une grosse, performed for a year at le Lieu theatre.

In 2011, she became a freelancer for many newspapers and magazines: on the one hand for the women's press (Psychologies magazine, Cosmopolitan, Pleine Vie or Avantages), on the other hand always on higher education subjects.

She is also a scriptwriter and has worked on several occasions for French television. She collaborated on the television series Parents mode d'emploi (France 2) as a scriptwriter and then collection director. She joined the series Clem (TF1) from season 8. She is also a screenwriter for TV movies (Liés pour la vie, based on the novel by Laëtitia Milot, 2021) or isolated episodes of series (Joséphine, ange gardien).

And finally, she is the author of a novel, Mission hygge, in 2018.

== Works ==
- Comment baiser en cachette, Paris: Hachette, 2007
- How to be a good, unworthy mother, Paris: Hachette pratique, 2007
- Comment grignoter en cachette, Paris : Hachette pratique, 2007
- Libido at half mast? Pimentez votre couple !, Paris: Hachette pratique, 2007
- Et si j'ai arrêtais d'avoir peur de m'engager, de faire un bébé, de changer de boulot, Paris : Hachette pratique, 2008
- Êtes-vous sûr d'avoir trouvé le bon ?, Paris: Hachette pratique, 2009
- Maman, faut couper le cordon !, Paris: Hachette pratique, 2009
- How to seduce a man (for sure), Paris: Hachette pratique, 2010
- 30 days to get rid of your complexes, Levallois-Perret: Studyrama-Vocatis, 2011
- Abécédaire de mon bébé, Paris: Chêne, 2012
- Abécédaire d'une femme enceinte, Paris: Chêne, 2012
- Cojean tout simplement, Paris: La Martinière, 2012
- Le guide des super parents de jumeaux, Paris: Mango, 2017
- Le guide des super parents d'ados, Paris: Mango, 2017
- Happy at work! 52 situations de crise à résoudre en un clin d'œil, Paris: éditions First, 2017
- Mission hygge, Paris: éditions First, 2018
