= Boris Furlan =

Slovenian jurist, philosopher of law, translator and politician

Boris Furlan (10 November 1894 – 10 June 1957) (Note: Various secondary sources cite 10 June 1957 as Furlan's death date, but his gravestone (incorrectly) reads 16 June 1957.) was a Slovenian jurist, philosopher of law, translator and liberal politician. During World War II, he worked as a speaker on Radio London, and was known as "London's Slovene voice". He served as a Minister in the Tito–Šubašić coalition government. In 1947, he was convicted by the Yugoslav Communist authorities at the Nagode Trial.

== Early life and career ==
He was born in a middle class Slovene family in Trieste, then part of the Austro-Hungarian Empire (today in Italy). He attended private Slovene language schools in Trieste. As a teenager, he attended an intensive English course at the local Berlitz language school, where he was a pupil of the Irish novelist James Joyce. After finishing the German language State gymnasium in Trieste in 1913, he went to study law at the University of Paris. After the break of World War I, he returned to Austria-Hungary, and enrolled in the University of Vienna. He finished his studies at the University of Bologna after the end of World War I. In 1920, he obtained a PhD from the University of Zagreb.

In 1920, Furlan returned to his home city of Trieste, which had become a part of the Kingdom of Italy. First, he worked as an assistant in the Josip Wilfan's law firm, establishing his own practice in 1925. In 1926, when Fascist Italianization was already in full advance, he managed to get a permit to publish a Slovene-language legal journal named Pravni vestnik (The Legal Herald), in which both Furlan and Wilfan published numerous text on legal philosophy and legal theory. The journal was abolished in 1928, as one of the last Slovene-language and Croat-language media prohibited by the Fascist regime. Between 1928 and 1930, Furlan worked as political advisor to Wilfan, who became one of the leaders of the Congress of European Nationalities.

In 1930, he escaped to the Kingdom of Yugoslavia in order to escape Fascist persecution. In 1931, he opened a law practice in Ljubljana, and in 1936 he became a professor of sociology of law at the University of Ljubljana.

== Exile during World War II ==
In late March 1941, when Yugoslavia signed the Tripartite Pact, Furlan was evacuated from the country with the help of the British intelligence service with which he had established a collaboration. After the Axis invasion of Yugoslavia and the Italian occupation of Slovenia, he was convicted to death in contumaciam by the Italian authorities. After a short stay in Palestine, Furlan travelled to the United States. Together with the liberal conservative Slovenian émigré politicians Izidor Cankar and Franc Snoj, Furlan propagated for the Yugoslav and Slovene cause. In 1942, he published a brochure titled Fighting Yugoslavia: The Struggle of the Slovenes, in which he articulated, among other, the Slovenian claims for the annexation of his native Julian March region to Yugoslavia.

In 1943, he moved to London, where he served as Minister of Education in the exile government of Miloš Trifunović between June and August 1943. In the first years of the war, Furlan supported the Chetnik resistance movement of Draža Mihajlović, but after early 1944, he became supportive of Josip Broz Tito's Yugoslav Partisans.

After the Yugoslav Prime Minister Ivan Šubašić recognized the partisan movement in June 1944, Furlan replaced Alojzij Kuhar as the official Slovene speaker of the Yugoslav government in exile for the Radio London. In summer 1944, he had several speeches directed to the members of the collaborationist Slovene Home Guard, urging them to join forces with the partisan forces. One of his speeches, titled A Clear Word from London was printed on leaflets which were dropped by Allied airplanes over Slovenia. In Autumn 1944, Furlan replaced Izidor Cankar as Minister for Culture and Telecommunication in the Provisional Government. In early 1945, he went to the liberated territories in southern Slovenia together with Franc Snoj.

== Under the Communist regime ==
After the end of World War II, he became the dean of the Faculty of Law of the University of Ljubljana. He tried to maintain a critical attitude towards the Communist regime; among other things, he secretly translated George Orwell's Animal Farm.

In June 1947, he was arrested and tried at the so-called Nagode Trial, together with 13 other liberal democratic and left-wing Slovene intellectuals, such as Črtomir Nagode, Ljubo Sirc, Angela Vode and Franc Snoj. Furlan was accused of having been member of a Masonic lodge in the 1930s, of having maintained contacts with the British intelligence since the late 1930s; the main accusation regarded his translation of Orwell's Animal Farm and his friendly relations with the American Red Cross official Jack Hoptner.

In August 1947, he was sentenced to death. The sentence was later commuted to 20 years of forced labour. He was released on parole after four and a half years because of illness.

In 1952, he moved to the small Upper Carniolan town of Radovljica to escape the daily intimidations to which he was subjected in the Slovenian capital. In November 1953, he was reportedly attacked by agents of the Yugoslav secret police, in which he suffered severe injuries.

He died in Ljubljana or Radovljica at the age of 62 and was interred in the cemetery in the Vič neighborhood of Ljubljana.

== Essential bibliography ==
- Pojem prava (The Concept of Law; Trieste, 1921)
- Crocejeva teorija prava (Croce's Theory of Justice; Trieste, 1921)
- Cankarjev Hlapec Jernej v luči pravne filozofije (Ivan Cankar's Short Story The Bailiff Yerney in the Light of Philosophy of Law; Trieste, 1926)
- Filozofija prava i opšte nauke o pravu (Philosophy of Law and General Legal Precepts; Belgrade, 1931)
- Problem realnosti prava (The Problem of Reality of Law; Ljubljana, 1932)
- Benedetto Croce (Ljubljana, 1934)
- Teorija pravnega sklepanja (The Theory of Legal Inference; Ljubljana, 1934)
- Filozofske osnove pojma nevarnosti v kazenskem pravu (The Philosophic Bases of the Concept of Danger in Criminal Law; Ljubljana, 1936)
- Politični nazor T. G. Masaryka (The Political Views of Tomáš Garrigue Masaryk; Ljubljana, 1937)
- Socialna filozofija Anatola Francea (The Social Philosophy of Anatole France; Ljubljana, 1937)
- Problem pravne kavzalnosti (The Problem of Juridical Causality; Ljubljana, 1938)
- Racionalizem in revolucija (Rationalism and Revolution; Ljubljana, 1939)

== Other ==
In 1998, the Slovenian writer Drago Jančar wrote a short story about Furlan, titled "Joyce's Pupil". The story was translated into English by Andrew B. Wachtel in 2006.

Boris Furlan was the father of the renowned physician Borut Furlan.

== See also ==
- Liberalism in Slovenia
