= Manca Marcelan =

Slovenian gymnast

Marcelan, August 2012

Manca Marcelan (born July 17, 1995 in Ljubljana, Slovenia) is a Slovenian rhythmic gymnast.

== Early life ==
Manca Marcelan was born on July 17, 1995 in Ljubljana, Slovenia. She developed an interest in rhythmic gymnastics at an early age, which formed the foundation of her subsequent career in the sport.

== Education ==
In 2018, Manca Marcelan earned her degree in psychology from the University of Ljubljana FF. She furthered her academic pursuits, obtaining a Master of Arts in Psychology in July 2020.

== Athletic career ==
=== Success at Home ===
- Trophy champion of Slovenia, Team 2010
- National Champion with the team in 2010
- National Champion in 2009, around gymnastics,
- Juniors - Slovenia Trophy winner,
- National Champion with the team in 2009, Champion with the ball in 2009
- National Champion, Champion with the ball in 2006
- Slovenia Trophy winner, Team 2006
- National Champion, group winner in 2005

=== Success Abroad ===
- European Junior Championships Bremen (Germany) 2010, Team 19th place
- Alpe Adria (Italy), Team 2008, 1st place
- Slovenian Challenge (Slovenia) 2008, 3rd place all-around, 2nd place ball, 3rd place hoop
- MTM Narodni dom Ljubljana (Slovenia) 2008, 1st place
- International tournament Nitra (Slovakia) 2008, 2nd place
- International tournament Mol (Belgium) 2008, 3rd place
- Alpe Adria (Italy) 2007, Team, 1st place
- International tournament Brno (Czech Republic) 2006, group exercises, 1st place
- MTM Narodni dom Ljubljana (Slovenia) 2006, 3rd place
- Alpe Adria (Italy) 2006, Team, 1st place
- New Year's Cup Moste (Slovenia) 2005, 3rd place
- International Tournament of Udine (Italy) 2003, 1st place
