= Bojan Accetto =

Slovenian physician

Bojan Accetto (4 September 1922 in Ljubljana – 26 July 2007) was a Slovenian physician and founder of gerontology in Slovenia. He was a professor of internal medicine nd of social gerontology at the Faculty of Social Sciences in Ljubljana. He established the institute for gerontology and geriatry. He explored the solidification of blood and thrombosis. He wrote "Starost in staranje" (Age and Ageing) - 1986. For his efforts, he received the Kidrič prize in 1958. His son, Rok Accetto, is a Slovenian cardiologist.

== Selected scientific publications ==
- Pokorn, Dražigost; Accetto, Bojan; Eržen, Nada; Poklar Vatovec, Tamara (1992). "Anthropometric measurements of elderly residents aged 60 to 101 years in Ljubljana (Slovenia)". Zdravstveni vestnik: Gazette of the Slovenian Medical Society. 61 (4): 177–185. ISSN 0350-0063. [COBISS.SI-ID 31108096].
- Pokorn, Dražigost; Accetto, Bojan; Leder-Erzen, Nada. "Nutritional assessment of institutionalized and noninstitutionalized elderly women over 80 years in Ljubljana (Yugoslavia) by some biochemical and anthropometric measurements". Glasnik Antropološkog društva Jugoslavije. 28: 57–63. ISSN 0351-1480. [COBISS.SI-ID 25984514].
- Pokorn, Dražigost; Accetto, Bojan; Prevorčnik, Ana (1991). "Plasma vitamin A level in men and women aged over 60 years". Zdravstveno varstvo: Slovenian Journal of Public Health. 30 (4–5): 71–74. ISSN 0351-0026. [COBISS.SI-ID 24600834].
- Pokorn, Dražigost; Accetto, Bojan; Prevorčnik, Ana (1990). "Vitamin E status in men and women aged 60–90 years". Acta medica Iugoslavica: Journal of the Yugoslav Medical Association. 44 (3): 223–232. ISSN 0375-8338. [COBISS.SI-ID 14951938].
- Pokorn, Dražigost; Accetto, Bojan (1990). "Distribution of subcutaneous adipose in old healthy people by sex and age in Ljubljana, Yugoslavia". Biological Journal: Journal of Slovenian Biologists. 38 (2): 45–54. ISSN 0520-1969. [COBISS.SI-ID 349145].
- Pokorn, Dražigost; Accetto, Bojan (1989). "Material for the anthropometric analysis of the old population in the area of the city of Ljubljana". Biological Bulletin: Bulletin of Slovenian Biologists. 37 (1): 75–90. ISSN 0520-1969. [COBISS.SI-ID 9359618].
- Pokorn, Dražigost; Accetto, Bojan (1989). "Indices of obesity and plasma lipids of people aged over 80 in the city of Ljubljana". Food and Nutrition: The Magazine of the Association of Societies for the Improvement of the Nutrition of the Nation of Yugoslavia. 29 (3): 137–140. ISSN 0018-6872. [COBISS.SI-ID 3535106].
- Pokorn, Dražigost; Accetto, Bojan; Stare, Janez (1988). "Nutritional habits of elder population on the Ljubljana territory". Health Care: Slovenian Journal of Public Health. 27 (3/5): 99–111. ISSN 0351-0026. [COBISS.SI-ID 14419968].
