= Dušan Repovš =

Slovenian mathematician

Dušan D. Repovš
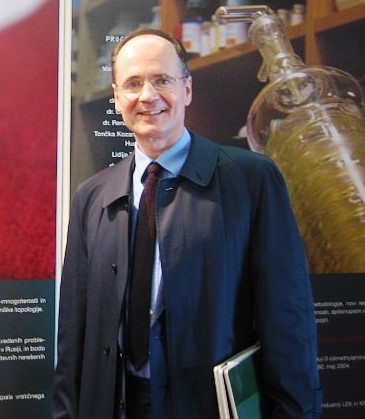
- Born: November 30, 1954 (age 71); Ljubljana, Yugoslavia
- Education: Florida State University; University of Ljubljana
- Scientific career
- Fields: Mathematics
- Workplaces: University of Ljubljana
- Thesis: Generalized Three-Manifolds with Zero-Dimensional Singular Set (1983)
- Doctoral advisor: Robert Christopher Lacher
- Website: repovs.fmf.uni-lj.si

Dušan D. Repovš (born November 30, 1954) is a Slovenian mathematician from Ljubljana, Slovenia.

== Education and academic career ==
He graduated in 1977 from the University of Ljubljana. He obtained his PhD in 1983 from Florida State University with thesis Generalized Three-Manifolds with Zero-Dimensional Singular Set written under the direction of Robert Christopher Lacher. He held a fellowship from the Research Council of Slovenia and a Fulbright scholarship.

In 1993 he was promoted to Professor of Geometry and Topology at the University of Ljubljana, where he is employed at the Faculty of Mathematics and Physics and at the Faculty of Education, as the Head of the Chair for Geometry and Topology. Since 1983 he has been the leader of the Slovenian Nonlinear Analysis, Topology and Geometry Group at the Institute of Mathematics, Physics and Mechanics in Ljubljana, and has directed numerous national and international research grants (with the United States, Japan, Russian Federation, China, France, Italy, Spain, Israel, United Kingdom, Poland, Hungary, Romania, Slovakia, and others). The Slovenian Research Agency has selected this group among the best research program groups in Slovenia.

Repovš is the leading Slovenian expert on nonlinear analysis and topology and is one of the best known Slovenian mathematicians. He has published over 450 research papers and has given numerous invited talks at various international conferences and universities around the world.

His research interests are in nonlinear analysis and its applications, topology, and algebra. He first became known in the 1980s for his results in geometric topology, notably the solution of the classical recognition problem for 3-manifolds, the proof of the 4-dimensional Cellularity Criterion, and the proof of the Lipschitz case of the classical Hilbert–Smith conjecture. Presently he is most actively investigating in nonlinear analysis. Later he extended his research to several other areas and is currently most actively investigating problems of partial differential equations. He covers a very broad spectrum: problems with nonstandard growth (variable exponents, anisotropic problems, double-phase problems), qualitative analysis of solutions of semilinear and quasilinear PDEs (Dirichlet, Neumann, Robin boundary conditions), singular and degenerate problems (blow-up boundary, singular reactions), inequality problems (variational, hemivariational, both either stationary or evolutionary). His analysis of these problems combines fine methods at the interplay between nonlinear functional analysis, critical point theory, variational, topological and analytic methods, mathematical physics, and others.

== Bibliography ==
He has published a monograph on nonlinear analysis, a monograph on partial differential equations with variable exponents, a monograph on continuous selections of multivalued mappings, and a monograph on higher-dimensional generalized manifolds, as well as also a university textbook on topology. He is serving on the editorial boards of the Journal of Mathematical Analysis and Applications, Advances in Nonlinear Analysis, Boundary Value Problems, Complex Variables and Elliptic Equations, and others.

== Memberships ==
He is a member of the European Academy of Sciences and Arts, the New York Academy of Sciences, the American Mathematical Society, the European Mathematical Society, the London Mathematical Society, the Mathematical Society of Japan, the Moscow Mathematical Society, the French Mathematical Society, the Swiss Mathematical Society, the Italian Mathematical Society and the Austrian Mathematical Society. He is also a founding member of the Slovenian Engineering Academy.

== Awards ==
For his outstanding research he was awarded in 2014 the honorary doctorate by the University of Craiova, in 2009 the Bogolyubov Memorial Medal by the Ukrainian Mathematical Congress in Kyiv and in 1997 the Prize of the Republic of Slovenia for Research (now called the Zois Prize). For his promotion of the Slovenian science abroad he received in 1995 the honorary title of the Ambassador for Science of the Republic of Slovenia.
