= Alojz Kodre =

Slovene physicist and translator

Alojzij Franc 'Alojz' Kodre (born 22 February 1944 in Villach, Austria) is a Slovenian physicist and translator.

Kodre was a professor at the Faculty of Mathematics and Physics in Ljubljana, where he lectured Mathematical Physics and Model Analysis. In Mathematical Physics, he succeeded Ivan Kuščer, who was the first lecturer of this subject at the University of Ljubljana. Kodre researches atomic physics (inner shells), low-energy spectroscopy and excitation phenomena caused by synchrotron light. After he retired, he was bestowed with the title of an emeritus by the University.

He has translated a number of English and American science fiction works to Slovene:

- Douglas Adams: The Hitchhiker's Guide to the Galaxy (1988), The Restaurant at the End of the Universe (1988), Life, the Universe and Everything (1989), So Long, and Thanks for All the Fish (2000), Mostly Harmless (1993), The Salmon of Doubt: Hitchhiking the Galaxy One Last Time (2002);
- Ray Bradbury: The Martian Chronicles (1980);
- Robert Anson Heinlein: The Door into Summer (1976);
- Fred Hoyle: Fifth Planet (1972); and others.

He is also known from a song by the singer-songwriter Marko Brecelj, Alojz valček (Alojz Waltz). Brecelj sang about a "master of mafia" (i.e., of mathematical physics).

In October 2022, Alojz Kodre was awarded the Blinc Award (named after Robert Blinc) by the Jožef Stefan Institute for lifetime achievement.

== Selected works ==
- In collaboration with Ivan Kuščer, Matematika v fiziki in tehniki, Matematika – fizika : zbirka univerzitetnih učbenikov in monografij [Mathematics - Physics : Collection of University Textbooks and Monographs], 36, Ljubljana, DMFA – publishing, 1994, 2006, ISBN 961-212-033-1 COBISS 41287936

== Sources ==
- "Alojz KODRE". Obrazi slovenskih pokrajin (in Slovenian).
