= Janez Orešnik =

Slovene linguist (1935–2024)

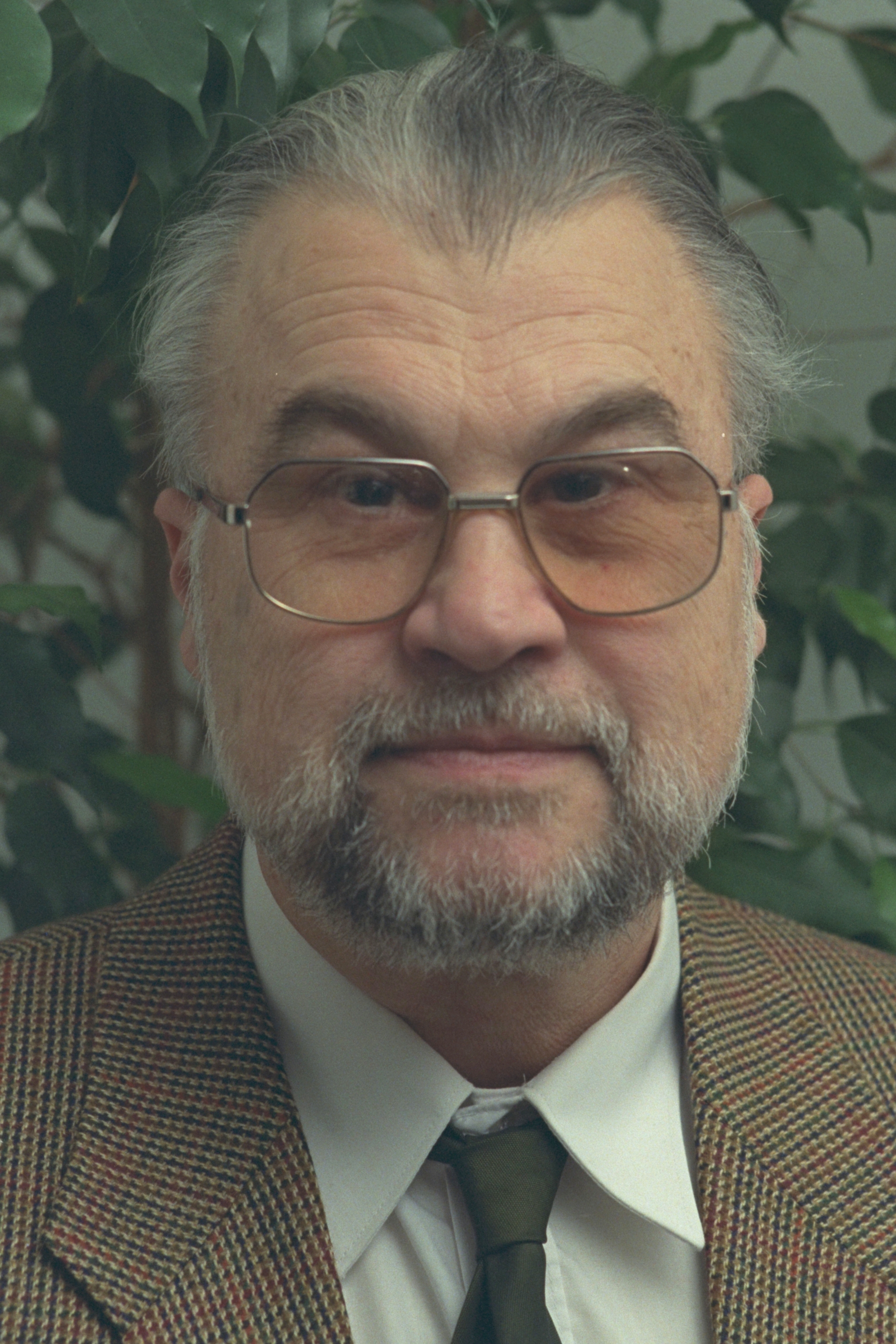
- Orešnik in 1995
- Born: 12 December 1935; Ljubljana, Kingdom of Yugoslavia now Slovenia)
- Died: 1 April 2024 (aged 88); Ljubljana, Slovenia
- Citizenship: Slovene
- Education: University of Ljubljana (PhD)
- Occupation: Linguist

Janez Orešnik (12 December 1935 – 1 April 2024) was a Slovene linguist.

== Early life and education ==
Orešnik was born in Ljubljana, Slovenia. He finished his undergraduate studies in comparative Indo-European linguistics at the University of Ljubljana in 1958, and completed his Ph.D. in Germanic linguistics at the same institution in 1965. He continued with post-doctoral studies at the University of Copenhagen (1959–1961), University of Zagreb (1962–1963), University of Reykjavik (1965–1966), and Harvard University (1969–1970).

== Career ==
Orešnik was an internationally recognized specialist in comparative linguistics. He served as chair of the Department of Comparative and General Linguistics at the University of Ljubljana from 1990 to 2004. He was a member of the Slovenian Academy of Sciences and Arts and a member of the European Academy of Sciences and Arts.

Until 1990 Orešnik focused on Germanic comparative linguistics and on Scandinavian languages, especially Icelandic. He formulated and partly substantiated some phonological rules of Icelandic. He described several non-standard phenomena of Icelandic phonology, especially within the preterit subjunctive and the imperative. His main publication from this period is Studies in the Phonology and Morphology of Icelandic (1985). The volume won the Slovenian Boris Kidrič Foundation Award in 1987. After 1985 Orešnik, together with a team of younger colleagues, developed a theory of strong and weak variants in syntax within Natural Linguistics; that is, synonymous syntactic units that compete with one another in the history of the language. The team formulated hypotheses about the direction of this competition and has checked the hypotheses in language material. The group organized two international conferences on Natural Linguistics (including the theory of strong and weak variants) at the University of Maribor, Slovenia, in 1993 and 1996. This theory is sometimes called the Slovenian model of Natural Syntax in international circles. After 1999, Orešnik abandoned the notion of strong and weak variants, calling them (morpho)syntactic variants instead. He published two volumes on this framework: A Predictable Aspect of (Morpho)syntactic Variants (2001), and Naturalness in (Morpho)syntax: English Examples (2004).

== Personal life and death ==
Orešnik married the Slavic scholar and translator Borghild Birgitta Gyllenberg (1931–1980). He married a second time to the linguist Varja Cvetko Orešnik (born 1947), the daughter of the composer and musicologist Dragotin Cvetko.

Orešnik died on 1 April 2024, at the age of 88, and was interred at Ljubljana's Žale Central Cemetery.

== Awards and recognitions ==
- 1987: Kidrič Award
- 2004: Golden Order of Merit
- 2007: Zois Award for Lifetime Achievement, the highest Slovene academic recognition

== Selected publications ==
- 1964: Menjava sprege v zgodovini islandskega glagola: disertacija (Ljubljana)
- 1970: O aksiomatski teoriji naravnih jezikov (Ljubljana: Institut Jožef Stefan)
- 1971: Jezikovni priročnik za napovedovalce (Ljubljana: Delavska univerza Boris Kidrič)
- 1972: O t. i. omejitvah v formalizirani slovnici naravnih jezikov (Ljubljana: Institut Jožef Stefan)
- 1985: Studies in the Phonology and Morphology of Modern Icelandic (Hamburg: Buske)
- 1992: Udeleženske vloge v slovenščini (Ljubljana: SAZU)
- 1994: Slovenski glagolski vid in univerzalna slovnica (Ljubljana: SAZU)
- 1995: Uradi za jezik v Skandinaviji (Ljubljana: SAZU)
- 1999: Krepke in šibke dvojnice v skladnji / Strong and Weak Variants in Syntax (Ljubljana: SAZU)
- 2001: A Predictable Aspect of (Morpho)syntactic Variants / Predvidljiv vidik (obliko)skladenjskih dvojnic (Ljubljana: SAZU)
- 2003: Slovenian from a Typological Perspective (coeditor, with Donald F. Reindl; Berlin: Akademie Verlag)
- 2004: Naturalness in (Morpho)syntax: English Examples / Jezikovna naravnost v (obliko)skladnji – angleški zgledi (Ljubljana: SAZU)
- 2011: Uvod v naravno skladnjo (Ljubljana: Znanstvena založba Filozofske fakultete)
- 2013: Diachronic Natural Syntax: Directionality of Change / Diahrona naravna skladnja: smeri sprememb (Ljubljana: SAZU)
- 2015: Naravna skladnja (Ljubljana: SAZU)
