= Francisco Reyes =

Francisco Reyes may refer to:

- Francisco Reyes (actor), Spanish actor
- Francisco Reyes (colonial-era Filipino banker)
- Francisco Reyes (equestrian), Argentine equestrian
- Francisco Reyes (footballer, born 1990), Honduran football goalkeeper
- Francisco Reyes (footballer, born 1941) (1941–1976), Paraguayan football midfielder
- Francisco Reyes (footballer, born 1998), Mexican footballer
- Francisco Reyes (illustrator), Filipino illustrator
- Francisco Reyes Marión, soldier of the Dominican Republic
- Francisco Reyes Morandé, Chilean actor
- Francisco Antonio Reyes, Salvadoran politician
