= Franc Grom =

Slovenian artist

Franc Grom is an artist in Stara Vrhnika, Slovenia (near Ljubljana). He carves detailed designs on eggshells. The designs typically include 2,000 to 3,000 holes.
