= Franc Hočevar =

Franz Josef Hočevar, in Slovenian, Franc Jože Hočevar (10 October 1853 in Metlika, Slovenia – 19 June 1919 in Graz, Austria) was an Austrian–Slovenian mathematician and author of mathematical books.

After grammar school in Ljubljana Hočevar studied mathematics and physics in Vienna, where he got his Ph.D. in 1875. He worked as professor and director of the "Lehrkanzel für Mathematik I" at the Technical University of Graz from 1894 to 1918. He was dean of the "Maschinenbauschule" from 1896 to 1900, 1906 to 1908 and from 1910 to 1913.
