= Ivan Vidav =

Slovenian mathematician (1918–2015)

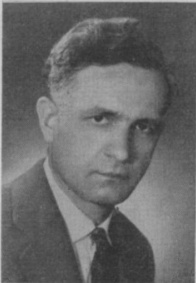
Ivan Vidav in 1963

Ivan Vidav (January 17, 1918 – October 6, 2015) was a Slovenian mathematician.

Ivan Vidav was born in Villa Opicina near Trieste, Italy. He was a student of Josip Plemelj. Vidav received his Ph.D. with Plemelj as his advisor in 1941 at the University of Ljubljana with the dissertation Kleinovi teoremi v teoriji linearnih diferencialnih enačb (Klein's Theorems in the Theory of Linear Differential Equations).

Vidav's main research interest were differential equations, functional analysis, and algebra. He was a regular member of the Slovenian Academy of Sciences and Arts. He received the Prešeren Award in recognition of his work.

In 1988, he became an honorary member of the Society of Mathematicians, Physicists and Astronomers of Slovenia (DMFA).
