= Andrej Čadež =

Slovene physicist and astrophysicist

Andrej Čadež (born September 12, 1942 in Ljubljana) is a Slovene physicist and astrophysicist.

He is the author of Fizika zvezd published in Ljubljana in 1986.
