= Franc Breckerfeld =

- Born: February 17, 1681; Laibach, Duchy of Carniola, Holy Roman Empire
- Died: October 29, 1744 (aged 63); Kolozsvár, Principality of Transylvania, Kingdom of Hungary, Habsburg Monarchy
- Citizenship: Holy Roman Empire
- Occupations: Mathematician, linguist, astronomer, theologian, priest, monk

Franc Breckerfeld (February 17, 1681 in Laibach – October 29, 1744 in Kolozsvár) was a Slovene theologian, mathematician, astronomer and latinist.

In his later years he was a member of the Royal Observatory at Kolozsvár.
