= Tomaž Prosen =

Slovene physicist

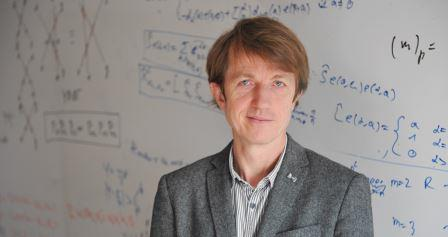
- Born: 6 April 1970 (age 56)
- Education: University of Ljubljana
- Known for: Many-body theory Quantum chaos
- Awards: Physik-Preis Dresden (2022), Advanced grant of the European Research Council (ERC AdG 2015), Alexander von Humboldt Foundation Bessel Award (2009), Zois prize (2005)
- Scientific career
- Fields: Physics
- Workplaces: University of Ljubljana

Tomaž Prosen (born 1970) is a Slovenian theoretical and mathematical physicist. His research has spanned non-equilibrium dynamics, statistical mechanics, quantum transport, and chaos theory.

== Early career ==
Prosen earned his Diploma in Physics in 1991, and a Doctorate of Science in 1995, both from the University of Ljubljana. He finished both at a significantly younger age than usual. ISI named him a 'Citation Superstar' as one of the most cited young scientists in Slovenia in 2000. He was made a Full Professor at the University of Ljubljana by outstanding early election in 2008.

== Research ==
Tomaž Prosen is primarily known for providing the first exact solutions for models of open quantum many-body systems and for the discovery of novel kinds of quantum conservation laws that settled long-standing questions about the nature of transport in fundamental models of low-dimensional quantum materials, such as the Heisenberg spin chains and the one-dimensional Hubbard model. The latter work also provided a full description of canonical ensembles of quantum integrable systems paving the way for extensions of thermodynamics to integrable systems. He is also known for pioneering a novel approach for establishing quantum chaos in spin-1/2 systems, for which previously known semi-classical methods fail. This approach challenged conventional beliefs in theoretical physics by providing an exact solution to the dynamics of a chaotic model.

== Memberships ==
He is a member of the European Academy of Sciences and Arts and the Slovenian Academy of Sciences and Arts.
