= Črtomir Nagode =

Slovenian politician (1903–1947)

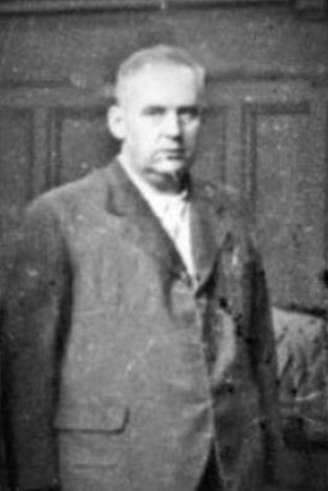
- Born: 6 April 1903; Metlika, Austro-Hungarian Empire
- Died: 27 August 1947 (aged 44); Ljubljana, Slovenia
- Cause of death: Execution by firing squad
- Occupations: Politician, geologist

Črtomir Nagode (6 April 1903 – 27 August 1947) was a Slovenian politician and geologist.

== Biography ==
Nagode was born on 6 April 1903 in Metlika, the son of Anton Nagode (1871–1942) and Silva Derč Nagode (1881–1947). He was a construction engineer and held a doctorate in geology and political science. In May 1941 he founded the Old Rights Party (Slovene: Stara pravda). This brought together liberally oriented Slovenian intellectuals that united in armed resistance to the Nazi and Fascist occupation forces in Slovenia. Prominent members of the party included Ljubo Sirc and Leon Kavčnik. Nagode joined the Liberation Front and was part of its leadership structure. However, he opposed the subordination of the other political parties to the Communist Party of Slovenia and the liquidations of Slovenes carried out by the communist Security and Intelligence Service (Slovene: Varnostno-obveščevalna služba, VOS). This led to conflict with Boris Kidrič and other communists. Because of the disagreement, in February 1942 the communists expelled Nagode and his party from the Liberation Front.

The Nagode house at Mirje no. 15

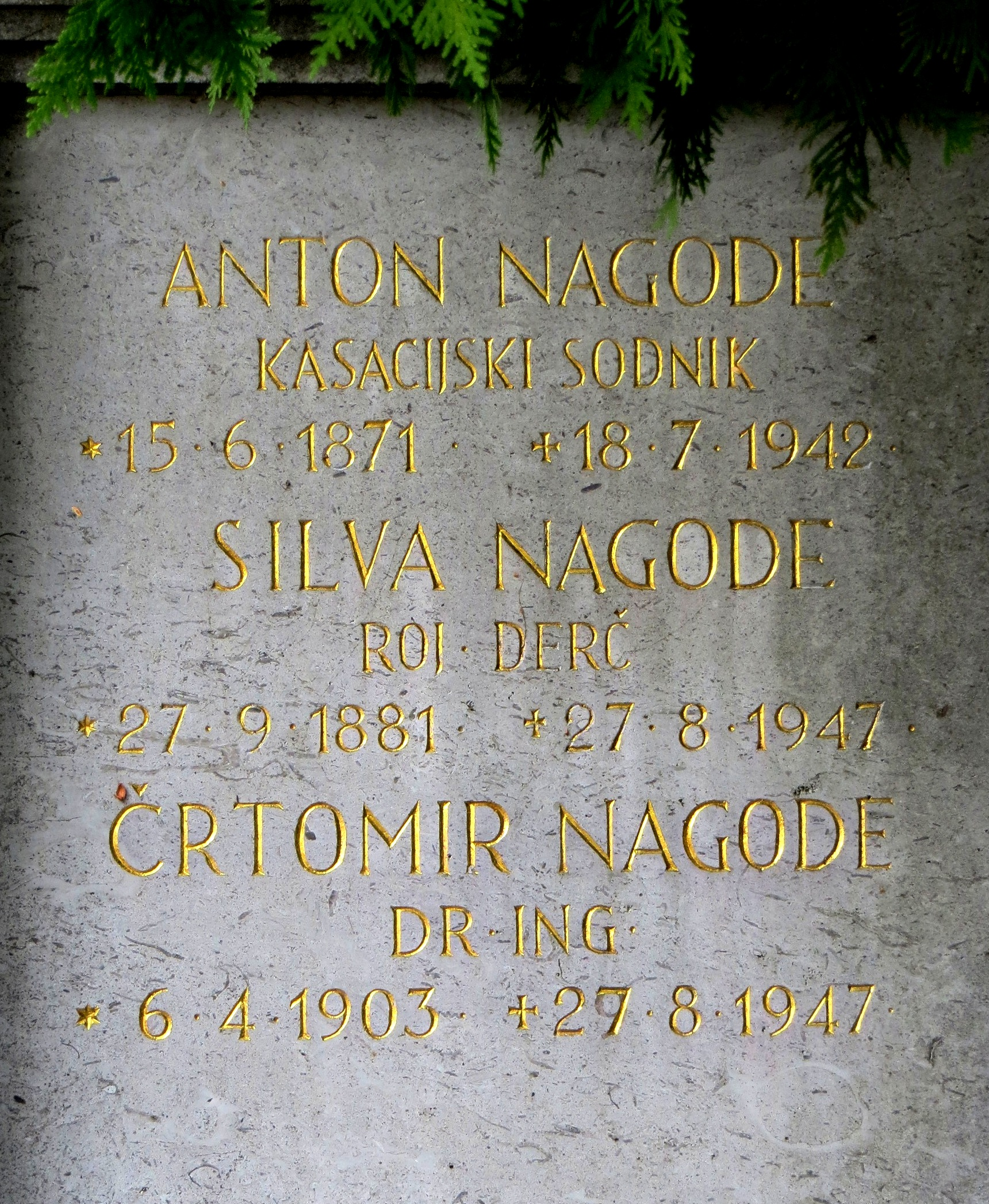
Nagode family grave

After the Second World War, Nagode sought to restore the liberal party and drew attention to violations of human rights in Slovenia. He was accused of treason and attempting to destroy the Yugoslav political system, and in the summer of 1947 he was arrested together with other leading members of the party. At the show trial known as the Nagode Trial (Slovene: Nagodetov proces) he was charged with being a spy and an agent of imperial powers, and sentenced to death by firing squad on 12 August 1947. He was executed on 27 August 1947. (Note: The inscription on the Nagode family gravestone in Žale cemetery has the death date 27 August 1947, also agreeing with the date of his mother's suicide, but Boris Mlakar's article states 12 September 1947. Another source gives the date as 8 September 1947. The plaque on the Nagode house states that he was executed in August.) His family's request to receive his body was denied, and his house in the Mirje neighborhood of Ljubljana was looted and seized by the state. His widowed mother, who had also been evicted from the house, committed suicide when she learned of her son's death. Permission to engrave Nagode's name on the family's tomb in Ljubljana's Žale Cemetery was denied until 1977. In a 2000 letter to President Milan Kučan, Ljubo Sirc requested in vain that the Slovenian government reveal the location of Nagode's body.

In 1991, the Supreme Court of Slovenia overturned Nagode's conviction, as well as the convictions of his codefendants, on the grounds that it had been based on false accusations and a corrupt trial against imaginary Western spies. The seized house at Mirje no. 15 was returned to the family's heirs in 2003 and a plaque honoring Nagode was installed on the building. The plaque reads: "Dr. Črtomir Nagode, 1903–1947, lived in this house. He was shot in August 1947 as the victim of a staged political trial. Remembrance" (V tej hiši je živel dr. ing. Črtomir Nagode, 1903–1947, streljen v avgustu 1947 kot žrtev montiranega političnega procesa. Reminiscentes).
