= Nagode Trial =

1947 show trial in Slovenia, Yugoslavia

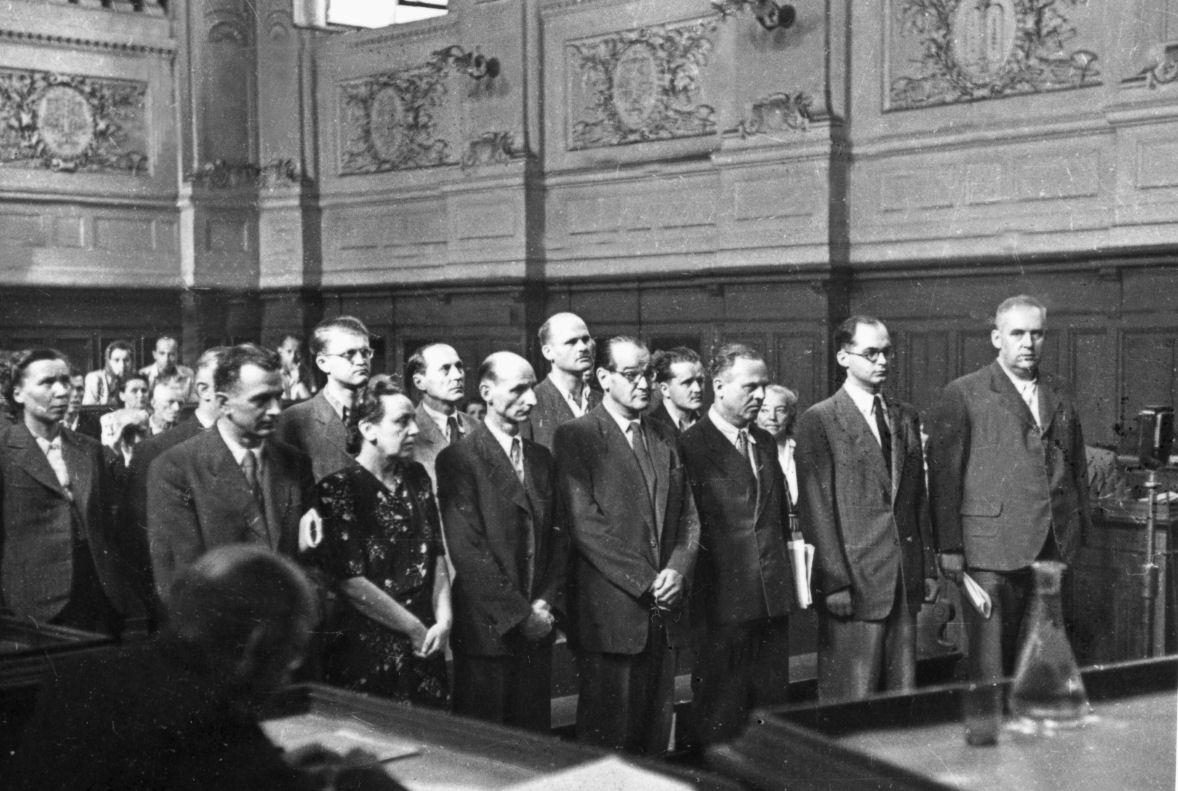
Defendants at trial

The Nagode Trial (Slovene: Nagodetov proces) was a political show trial in Slovenia, Yugoslavia in 1947.

The trial was carried out by the Slovene authorities under the leadership of the Communist Party of Slovenia against non-communist politicians that wished to participate in politics in Slovenia after 1945. In May 1947, the State Security Administration (i.e., the secret police) arrested 32 highly educated intellectuals. Some were former members of the Communist Party of Slovenia, but the majority were liberal democrats inclined toward western-style parliamentary democracy. On July 27, 1947, the indictment was brought against 14 accused – Črtomir Nagode, Ljubo Sirc, Leon Kavčnik, Boris Furlan, Zoran Hribar, Angela Vode, Metod Kumelj, Pavla Hočevar, Svatopluk Zupan, Bogdan Stare, Metod Pirc, Vid Lajovic, Franjo Sirc, and Elizabeta Hribar. Proceedings against Franc Snoj were added on 4 August. For two months, prior to the trial, each of the accused had been interrogated and tortured in Ljubljana's prisons. The Politburo of the Central Committee of the Communist Party of Slovenia used the Yugoslav media to characterize those arrested as "a handful of spies, class enemies, and foreign-paid agents, who have no political program and whose work, with no political value at all, is to damage the people's authority." The trial against the accused began on July 29, and the proceedings were broadcast to the public via special loudspeakers on the streets. The public prosecutor in the trial was Viktor Avbelj, later the president of the presidency of the Socialist Republic of Slovenia, while Drago Supančič was used as the incriminating witness. The trial became known as the "Nagode trial" after the principal defendant. After thirteen days of hearings, on August 12, three of the defendants (Nagode, Boris Furlan, and Ljubo Sirc) were sentenced to be shot, while others were sentenced to lengthy prison sentences with forced labor, deprivation of all civil rights, and confiscation of all personal property. Nagode was shot on August 27, 1947, (Note: The inscription on the Nagode family gravestone in Žale cemetery has the death date August 27, 1947, also agreeing with the date of his mother's suicide, but Boris Mlakar's article states September 12, 1947. Another source gives the date as September 8, 1947. The plaque on the Nagode house states that he was executed in August.) and the death sentences against Furlan and Sirc were commuted to 20-year prison sentences. In 1991, the Supreme Court of the Republic of Slovenia retroactively overturned the conviction against Nagode and his fourteen co-defendants on the grounds it had been based on false testimony.

== See also ==
- Dachau trials (Slovenia)
