= Janez Strnad =

Slovene physicist and popularizer of natural science

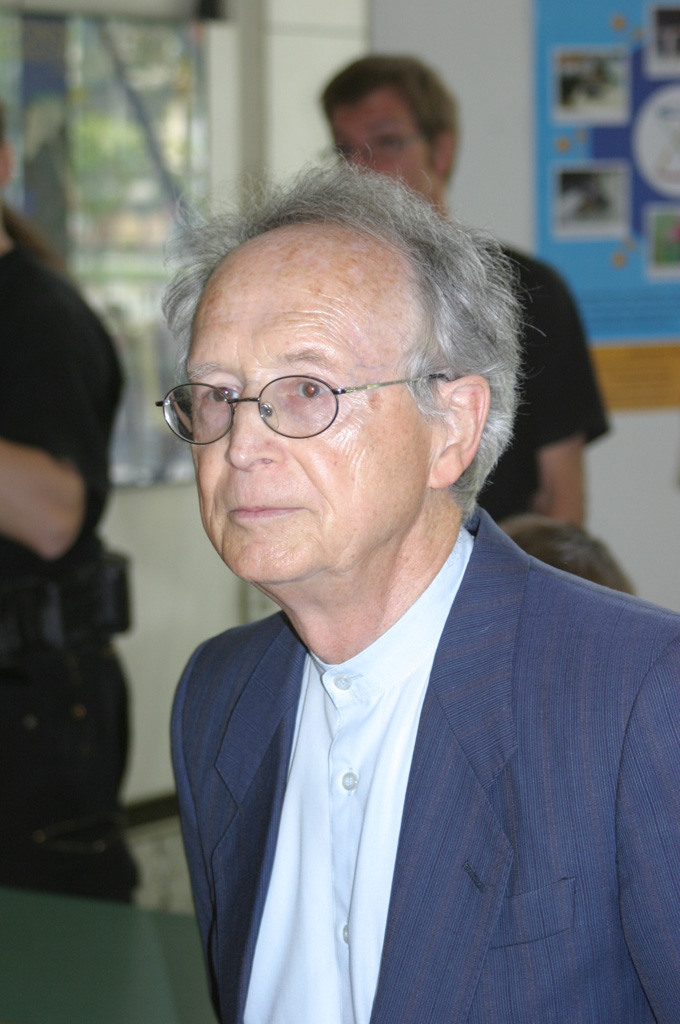
- Born: March 4, 1934; Ljubljana, Kingdom of Yugoslavia (now Slovenia)
- Died: November 28, 2015 (aged 81)

Janez Strnad (March 4, 1934 – November 28, 2015) was a Slovene physicist and popularizer of natural science.

== Life and work ==
Strnad was born in Ljubljana, Kingdom of Yugoslavia (now Slovenia).

He received a degree at the University of Ljubljana in technical physics in 1957, and got his Ph.D. in 1963. His main research work was carried out at the Jožef Stefan Institute. He taught for many years beginning in 1961 at the University of Ljubljana, Faculty for natural science and technology on the Department of physics introductory courses and topics from physics. In 1974 he became a full professor. In 1990 he wrote a book about fundamental particles physics entitled Iz take so snovi kot sanje (We are such stuff as dreams are made of). With his short and long articles he had deepened the knowledge about Stefan's scientific work. His thick booklet in the series of monographs, Zbirka Sigma (the Sigma Collection), entitled Kvantna fizika (Quantum Physics), (DZS, Ljubljana 1974) contains a definition and introduction to the understanding of Heisenberg's uncertainty principle for the graduate beginner. He wrote over 1000 works.

Strnad's works also includes topics of physics which are not exactly related at first glance to it, for instance as in this his article Znanost in politika v vinjetah (Science and politics in vignettes)].

== Selected works ==
=== University textbooks ===
1. Janez Strnad, Atlas klasične in moderne fizike (Atlas of classical and modern physics), translation and adaptation of Hans Breuer, dtv-Atlas zur Physik, (Deutscher Taschenbuch Verlag, München 1987, 1988), DZS, Ljubljana 1993, pp 400, COBISS 35693056.
2. Janez Strnad, Fizika, 1. del, Mehanika, Toplota (Physics, 1st part, Mechanics, Heat), (DZS, Ljubljana 1977, pp 1 – 284.
3. Janez Strnad, Fizika, 2. del, Elektrika, Optika (Physics, 2nd part, Electricity, Optics), (DZS, Ljubljana 1978, pp 285 – 564).
4. Janez Strnad, Fizika, 3. del, Posebna teorija relativnosti, Atomi (Physics, 3rd part, Special Theory of relativity, Atoms), (DZS, Ljubljana 1980, pp 320).
5. Janez Strnad, Fizika, 4. del, Molekule, kristali, jedra, delci (Physics, 4th part, Molecules, Crystals, Nuclei, Particles), (DZS, Ljubljana 1982, pp 283).
6. Janez Strnad, Mladen Gros, Marjan Hribar, Alojz Kodre, Naloge iz fizike (Exercises from Physics), (DMFA SRS, Ljubljana 1981, pp 108).

=== Selected chapters from physics and postgraduate seminars ===
1. Janez Strnad, Fazna, skupinska, signalna hitrost (Phase, Group, Signal Velocity), (DMFA SRS, Ljubljana 1975, pp 31).
2. Janez Strnad, Poskusi v posebni in splošni teoriji relativnosti (Experiments in Special and General Theory of Relativity), (DMFA SRS, Ljubljana 1977, pp 44).
3. Janez Strnad, Na pot v kvantno elektrodinamiko (On the way to the Quantum Electrodynamics), (DMFA SRS, Ljubljana 1986, pp 176).
4. Janez Strnad, Na pot k Schwarzschildu (On the way to Schwarzschild), (DMFA S, Ljubljana 1991, pp 52).
5. Janez Strnad, Homogeno gravitacijsko polje: med posebno in splošno teorijo relativnosti (Homogeneous Gravitational Field: Between Special and General Theory of relativity), (DMFA S, Ljubljana 1994, pp 44).
6. Janez Strnad, Začetki kvantne statistične mehanike (The Beginnings of Quantum Statistical Mechanics), (DMFA S, Ljubljana 1997, pp 31).
7. Janez Strnad, Odkritje razcepa (Discovery of the split), (DMFA S, Ljubljana 2000, pp 39).

=== Books ===
1. Janez Strnad, Jožef Stefan, Ob stopetdesetletnici rojstva (Jožef Stefan, By his 150th anniversary of birth), (DMFA SRS, Ljubljana 1985).
2. Janez Strnad, Prapok Prasnov požene v dir (Primordial Bang drives Primordial Substance into a Gallop), (DZS, Ljubljana 1988, pp 81).
3. Janez Strnad, Zgodbe iz fizike (Stories from Physics), (Slovenska matica, Ljubljana 1990).
4. Janez Strnad, Fiziki 1 (Physicists 1), (Mihelač in Nešović, Ljubljana 1995, pp 159).
5. Janez Strnad, Razvoj fizike (The Development of Physics), (DZS Ljubljana 1996, pp 400).
6. Janez Strnad, Fiziki 2 (Physicists 2), (Modrijan, Ljubljana 1999, pp 199).
7. Janez Strnad, Fiziki 3 (Physicists 3), (Modrijan, Ljubljana 2000, pp 227).
8. Janez Strnad, Svet merjenj: o razvoju fizike in merjenju osnovnih fizikalnih količin (The World of Measurements: About the Development of Physics and Measuring of Fundamental Physical Quantities), (DZS, Ljubljana 2001, pp 139).
9. Janez Strnad, Sto let fizike: od 1900 do 2000 (A Hundred Years of Physics: from 1900 to 2000), (DMFA S, Ljubljana 2001, pp 233).

=== Scientific articles ===
1. Janez Strnad, Sto let Stefanovega zakona (Hundred years of Stefan's law), (Obzornik mat, fiz. 26 (1979) 3).
2. Janez Strnad, A. Vengar, Stefanova meritev toplotne prevodnosti zraka (Stefan's measurements of the thermal conductivity of air), (European Journal of Physics, 1984).
3. Janez Strnad, Kako je Jožef Stefan odkril zakon o sevanju (How Jožef Stefan discovered the law of radiation), (Zbornik za zgodovino naravoslovja in tehnike 8, Ljubljana 1985).
4. Janez Strnad, Stefanov tok (Stefan's current), (Obzornik mat, fiz. 32 (1985).
5. Janez Strnad, Stefanova naloga (Stefan's task), (Obzornik mat, fiz. 34 (1987).
6. Janez Strnad, Stefanove elektodinamične enačbe (Stefan's equations of electrodynamics), (European Journal of Physics, 1989).
7. Janez Strnad, Ernst Mach kot fizik (Ernst Mach as physicist), (Zbornik za zgodovino naravoslovja in tehnike 10, Ljubljana 1989).
8. Janez Strnad, Dvigajoči se mehurčki (Rising bubbles), (Obzornik mat, fiz. 39 (1992) 4, pp 85 – 89).
9. Janez Strnad, Oslabitev Brownovega gibanja (Squeezing Brownian motion), (Obzornik mat, fiz. 39 (1992) 2, pp 49 – 54).
10. Janez Strnad, Opazovanje in teorija (Observation and theory), (Obzornik mat, fiz. 39 (1992) 5, pp 141 – 150).
11. Janez Strnad, J. Stefana 'Longitudinalna nihanja palic' (J. Stefan's 'Longitudinal oscillations of rods' ), (Obzornik mat, fiz. 40 (1993) 1, pp 17 – 19).
12. Janez Strnad, Ali mora znati, kdor uči? (Should he who teaches know?), (Obzornik mat, fiz. 40 (1993) 1, pp 23 – 31).
13. Janez Strnad, Superprevodnost (Superconductivity), (Obzornik mat, fiz. 40 (1993) 4, pp 110 – 120).
14. Janez Strnad, Nenavadni interferenčni poskusi I. Interferenčni poskus s sevanjema v nasprotnih smereh (Unusual interference experiments I. Interference experiment with radiations in opposite directions), (Obzornik mat, fiz. 40 (1993) 5, pp 135 – 136).
15. Janez Strnad, Supertekočnost (Superfluidity), (Obzornik mat, fiz. 40 (1993) 6, pp 183 – 191).
16. Janez Strnad, Fizika iz Karlsruheja: O novostih v poučevanju fizike (The Karlsruhe physics course: On new approaches in physics teaching), (Obzornik mat, fiz. 41 (1994) 4, pp 122 – 128).
17. Janez Strnad, Nenavadni interferenčni poskusi I. Youngov poskus z ionoma (Unusual interference experiments I. Young's experiment with two ions), (Obzornik mat, fiz. 41 (1994) 5, pp 119 – 153).
18. Janez Strnad, Nenavadni interferenčni poskusi, Interferenčni poskus z laserjema (Unusual interference experiments, Interference experiment with two lasers), (Obzornik mat, fiz. 41 (1994) 6, pp 187 – 190) (PACS 42.50.-p.)
19. Janez Strnad, Premo centralno gibanje J. Vege (J. Vega's linear central motion), (Obzornik mat, fiz. 47 (2000) 1, pp 20 – 26). (PACS 01.65.+g, 45.40GJ)
20. Janez Strnad, Nenavadni interferenčni poskusi, Interferenčni poskus z molekulami C_{60} (Unusual interference experiments, An interference experiment with C_{60} molecules), (Obzornik mat, fiz. 47 (2000) 2, pp 53 – 56) (PACS 33.80.-b.)
21. Janez Strnad, Precesija enakonočij (The precession of equinoxes), (Obzornik mat, fiz. 47 (2000) 4, pp 120 – 125). (PACS 01.65.+g)
22. Janez Strnad, Osnovne fizikalne konstante 1998 (Fundamental physical constants 1998), (Obzornik mat, fiz. 47 (2000) 5, pp 177 – 179). (PACS 06.20.Jr)
23. Janez Strnad, Rubinowicz v Ljubljani (Rubinowics in Ljubljana), (Obzornik mat, fiz. 47 (2000) 6, pp 144 – 146). (PACS 01.60.+g)
24. Janez Strnad, O gravitacijski konstanti (On the Newtonian gravitational constant), (Obzornik mat, fiz. 48 (2001) 1, pp 19 – 25). (PACS 04.80.-y)
25. Janez Strnad, Med dvema ognjema? (Between two fires?), (Obzornik mat, fiz. 48 (2001) 1, pp 92 – 94). (PACS 06.20.Fn)
26. Janez Strnad, Sevalni tlak in P. N. Lebedev (Radiation Pressure and P. N. Lebedev), (Obzornik mat, fiz. 48 (2001) 1, pp 148 – 153). (PACS 01.65.+g, 45.40GJ)
27. Janez Strnad, Prožni trak kot model vesolja (The elastic ribbon as a model universe), (Obzornik mat, fiz. 49 (2002) 1, pp 21 – 27). (PACS 98.80.-k)
28. Janez Strnad, Stefanova sila (Stefan's force), (Obzornik mat, fiz. 49 (2002) 2, pp 58 – 61). (PACS 01.65.+g, 47.15.-x)
29. Janez Strnad, Interferenca elektronov na svetlobi (Interference of electrons on light), (Obzornik mat, fiz. 49 (2002) 5, pp 148 – 150). (PACS 33.80.-b)
30. Janez Strnad, Vega o obliki Zemlje (Vega on the form of the Earth), (Obzornik mat, fiz. 50 (2003) 1, pp 27 - III). (PACS 01.65.+g, 45.40GJ)
31. Janez Strnad, O elektronih v atomu (On electrons in atom), (Obzornik mat, fiz. 50 (2003) 3, pp 82 – 85). (PACS 01.40.Ej)
32. Janez Strnad, Kako sem pisal učbenik za fiziko (How I wrote a physics textbook), (Obzornik mat, fiz. 50 (2003) 5, pp 157 – 160). (PACS 01.40.Gm)
33. Janez Strnad, Bose-Einsteinova kondenzacija cezija (Bose-Einstein condensation of cesium), (Obzornik mat, fiz. 50 (2003) 6, pp 184 – 191). (PACS 03.75.Fi)

=== Popular articles ===
1. Janez Strnad, Jožef Stefan, Ob stopetdesetletnici rojstva (Jožef Stefan, By his 150th anniversary of birth), (Presek (1985) 5).
2. Janez Strnad, Stogodišnjica Stefanovega zakona (Hundred years of Stefan's law), (Dijalektika, Belgrade 1979 3–4).
3. Janez Strnad, Svetlobni mlinček (Light grinder), (Presek 24 (1996/1997) 130).
4. Janez Strnad, Natančnejši podatki o vesolju (More accurate data about the Universe), (Delo, Znanost/Scientia, April 7, 2003, pp 3)

=== Colloquiums ===
1. Janez Strnad, Bose-Einsteinova kondenzacija alkalijskih atomov (Bose-Einstein's condensation of alkaline atoms), (FMF, IJS, Ljubljana November 5, 2001).
2. Janez Strnad, Nobelova nagrada za fiziko 2000 (Nobel prize for physics 2000), (FMF, IJS, Ljubljana November 6, 2000).
3. Janez Strnad, Alojz Kodre, Profesor Kuščer - In Memoriam (In memory of professor Kuščer), (FMF, IJS, Ljubljana February 2, 2000).
