= Ljubo Sirc =

British economist (1920–2016)

Ljubo Sirc CBE
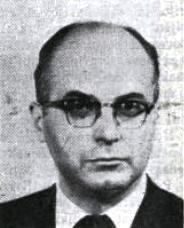
- Sirc in 1964
- Born: 19 April 1920; Kranj, Kingdom of Serbs, Croats, and Slovenes (now Slovenia)
- Died: 1 December 2016 (aged 96)
- Occupation: Economist

Ljubo Sirc CBE (19 April 1920 – 1 December 2016) was a British-Slovene economist and prominent dissident from Yugoslavia.

== Life and work ==
Sirc was born in Kranj, then part of the Kingdom of Serbs, Croats, and Slovenes, in a wealthy and renowned family of Slovene and Yugoslav patriots. His grandfather was a liberal and monarchist politician and mayor of Kranj, and his father was a local entrepreneur.

After the Axis invasion of Yugoslavia, Sirc managed to escape to Switzerland, where he established contact with other Yugoslav emigrants. In summer 1944, after the Tito-Šubašić agreement, he joined the Yugoslav Resistance and served in the Yugoslav Army in Dalmatia, Croatia, and Slovenia until 1945. After the establishment of the Communist regime, he joined other liberals and social democrats, who tried to form a legal political opposition to the regime. In 1947, due to his political activity and friendship with Western diplomats, he was tried in the Nagode Trial and sentenced to death. His sentence was ultimately commuted to twenty years in prison, of which he served seven, much of it in solitary confinement. He spent his time in assiduous reading; he became an expert in Marxist political and economic thought, and he was also able to read the most up-to-date Western, especially English and American, economic literature, provided to him by the Slovenian communists to translate it for "internal security purposes."

After his release, he escaped to Italy with the help of former TIGR member Stanislav Kamenšček. From there, he moved to the United Kingdom, where he started an academic career. In his various teaching posts since then, including twenty years at the University of Glasgow, Sirc was a leading expert on socialist economics and communist regimes. He was one of the founders of the Centre for Research into Communist Economies (CRCE) in London and headed it. For many years, he lectured on political economy at Glasgow University.

In 1962, Sirc was among the co-founders of the opposition platform Democratic Alternative, together with a group of Serb, Croat, and Bosniak pro-Yugoslav emigrants.

== Activity in post-communist Slovenia ==
After the fall of the communist regime in Slovenia, Sirc was active in Slovenian public life, writing articles, giving interviews, and commenting on political developments and economic issues. In 1990 and 1991, his opposition to the independence of Slovenia caused some controversy. Sirc supported a unified and democratic Yugoslavia and, although he admitted this solution was not feasible at the time, he refused to uphold the idea of an independent Slovenia until the outbreak of the Ten-Day War. He then endorsed Slovenia's decision to break from the Yugoslav Federation.

In 1992, he ran for President of Slovenia with the support of the Liberal Democratic Party (LDS), but received less than 2% of the vote. He later claimed that he had been fooled into accepting the candidacy: he believed, according to his account, that the party had really accepted an economically and politically liberal program, whereas in reality, he claimed, it remained strongly linked to the former communist establishment. In fact, as subsequent polls showed, the great majority of the Liberal Democratic Party's voters voted for Milan Kučan in the presidential elections.

Sirc later sharply criticised both Janez Drnovšek and Milan Kučan, accusing them of hindering the development of an Open Society in Slovenia. In the late 1990s, he collaborated with the writer Drago Jančar and historians Vasko Simoniti and Alenka Puhar in staging an influential exhibition on human rights violations in communist Slovenia called Temna stran meseca (The Dark Side of the Moon).

In 2004, he was among the co-founders of the liberal conservative civic platform Rally for the Republic (Slovene: Zbor za republiko). In the 2000 and 2004 parliamentary elections, he publicly supported the Slovenian Democratic Party. In May 2010, he became a member of the Slovenian Democratic Party.

In his later years, Sirc lived in Glasgow's West End and regularly visited his homeland.

== Books ==
- Outline of International Trade: Commodity Flows & Division of Production Between Countries (1974)
- Outline of International Finance: Exchange Rates & Payments Between Countries (1974)
- Between Hitler and Tito (autobiography, 1989)
- Economic Devolution in Eastern Europe (1969)
- The Yugoslav Economy Under Self-Management (1979)
- What Must Gorbachev Do? (1989)
- Political Morality in Yugoslavia (1996)

== See also ==
- Boris Furlan
- Angela Vode
- Titoism
- Communist Party of Yugoslavia
- Liberalism in Slovenia
- Mitja Ribičič
- Pavle Gantar
