= Franc Snoj =

Slovenian politician and economist

Franc Snoj (28 January 1902 – 22 April 1962) was a Slovenian politician and economist.

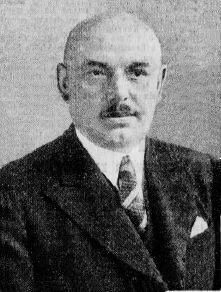
Franc Snoj

He was a minister without portfolio in the Kingdom of Yugoslavia in 1938 and 1939. During the Second World War, together with the other members of the Yugoslav government, he emigrated to the U.S. and then to London, where he worked for the liberation of Yugoslavia from the Axis powers.

In 1944, he returned to Slovenia, in cooperation with the Partisans of Josip Broz Tito and the approval of Edvard Kardelj, seeking to get non-communist fighters to join the Partisan struggle for liberation.

After the war, he became Minister of Transportation in the national government of Slovenia. He was the first who opposed the post-war extrajudicial killings at Kočevje Rog. Because of this opposition, in 1947 he was arrested and tried during the Nagode Trial; he was sentenced to seven years in prison, but was released after four years.
