= Robert Blinc =

Slovenian physicist (1933–2011)

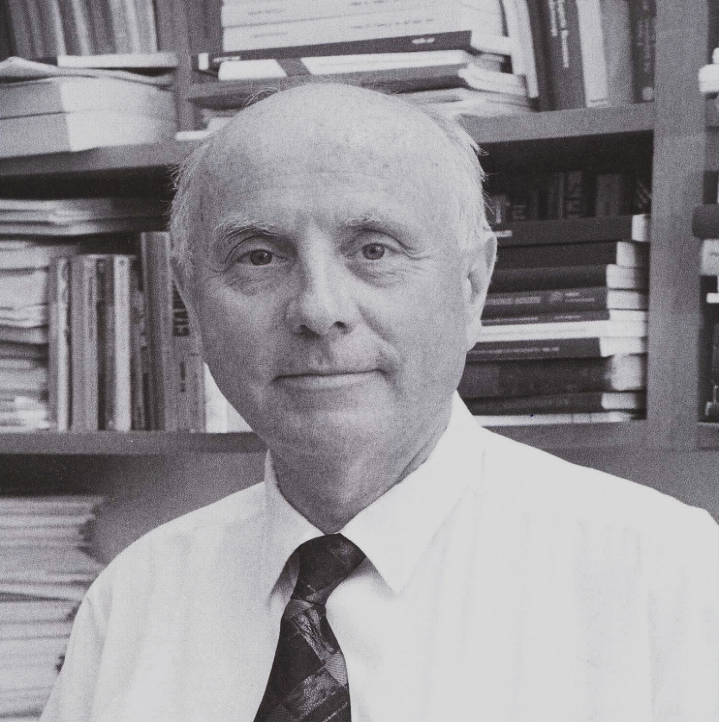
- Born: October 30, 1933; Ljubljana
- Died: September 26, 2011 (aged 77); Ljubljana
- Website: http://www.sazu.si/o-sazu/clani/robert-blinc.html

Robert Blinc (October 30, 1933 – September 26, 2011) was a prominent Slovene physicist a full professor of physics and, with more than 650 articles in prestigious international journals and two extensive monographs published abroad, a highly regarded and quoted researcher in condensed matter physics.

His reputation is evident through over 14,000 citations of his works, visits to prestigious foreign universities, several invited lectures at international conferences, and active participation in international professional organizations and various collaborative projects. With his achievements and diversified activity, Professor Blinc substantiated the experimental physics of condensed matter in Slovenia, and with his commitment to international openness he made a key contribution to the Ljubljana's global reputation among physicists. As a university teacher, he also educated a large number of Slovenian physicists.

== Education ==
He completed his undergraduate studies in 1958 at the Faculty of Natural Sciences in Ljubljana and received a PhD a year later. He then started post-doc study at the Massachusetts Institute of Technology. When he returned to Slovenia, he continued his work at the Jožef Stefan Institute as a long-time head of the Department for Condensed Matter Physics. He became a professor at the University of Ljubljana in 1970. He was the first Dean of Jožef Stefan International Postgraduate School in Ljubljana since 2004.

== Scientific career ==
Robert Blinc has been a visiting professor at many international universities, winner of numerous international awards, a member of various associations and editorial boards of international professional journals. In 1991 he became the Ambassador of the Republic of Slovenia in Science, and in 2000 the Institute for Scientific Information (ISI) awarded Professor Blinc the award for the Slovenian scientist with the most citations during the 25-year existence of ISI. In 2001, together with his colleagues, he received the state award for patents and inventions of the Republic of Slovenia. He was a member of the Slovenian Academy of Sciences and Arts and served as its vice president from October 2, 1980, to May 6, 1999. He was also a member of the European Academy of Sciences and Arts and an honorary member of the Society of Mathematicians, Physicists and Astronomers of Slovenia. He died in Ljubljana, Slovenia.

Professor Blinc was one of the founders of the uses of nuclear magnetic resonance for investigations of phase transitions and liquid crystals. Shortly after graduating, Blinc established a nuclear magnetic resonance (NMR) laboratory with a few young colleagues(his first paper on the subject was published in early 1958) and was the head of the Condensed Matter Physics Department at the Jožef Stefan Institute., which became one of the most important European and global centers for research into structural transitions in regulated and partially regulated condensed matter. He is the founder of the so-called Ljubljana School of Magnetic Resonance Imaging. Immediately after his employment, he published findings on the disharmony of the hydrogen bond. Among his most important scientific achievements is the model of ferroelectrics with hydrogen bonds, which some authors refer to in the literature as the Blinc-de Gennes model. The Blinc-Pincus spin network relaxation mechanism of nematic liquid crystals due to collective fluctuations of nematic order parameters is also known. Among other important achievements, special mention should be made of the detection of solitons and shapes in incommensurable crystals by nuclear magnetic resonance and the introduction of NMR methods to determine the Edwards-Anderson parameter of the glassy order in proton and deuteron glasses and relaxors. This parameter was previously considered not to be a directly measurable quantity. The result of his work is also a series of new spectroscopic methods, which, among other things, enabled the determination of the structure of amino acids and nucleic acids, as well as the cultivation of new plant species with better nutritional properties and rapid characterization of building materials. Together with Boštjan Žekš, he was the first to predict the existence of the Goldstone mode of oscillation in ferroelectric liquid crystals. He and co-workers introduced the Ising model to describe proton and deuteron glasses.
