= List of Slovenian historians =

A list of important Slovene historians:

- Martin Baučer (1595–1668)
- Johann Ludwig Schönleben (1618–1681)
- Johann Weikhard von Valvasor (1641–1693)
- Marko Hanžič (1683–1766)
- Anton Tomaž Linhart (1756–1795)
- Urban Jarnik (1784–1844)
- Davorin Trstenjak (1817–1890)
- Karl Deschmann (1821–1889)
- Janez Trdina (1830–1905)
- Simon Rutar (1851–1903)
- Dragotin Lončar (1876–1954)
- Bogumil Vošnjak (1882–1955)
- Milko Kos (1892–1972)
- Alojzij Kuhar (1895–1958)
- Lojze Ude (1896–1982)
- France Klopčič (1903–1986)
- Fran Zwitter (1905–1988)
- Bogo Grafenauer (1916–1995)
- Sergij Vilfan (1919–1996)
- Vasilij Melik (1921–2009)
- Janko Pleterski (b. 1923)
- Toussaint Hočevar (1927–1987)
- Milica Kacin-Wohinz (b. 1930)
- Slavko Kremenšek (b. 1931)
- Branko Marušič (b. 1938)
- Jože Pirjevec (b. 1940)
- Janko Prunk (b. 1942)
- Jožko Šavli (b. 1943)
- Boris M. Gombač (b. 1945)
- Alenka Puhar (b. 1945)
- Peter Vodopivec (b. 1946)
- Tamara Griesser-Pečar (b. 1947)
- Janez J. Švajncer (b. 1948)
- Jerca Vodušek Starič (b. 1950)
- Vasko Simoniti (b. 1951)
- Oto Luthar (b. 1959)
- Marta Verginella (b. 1960)
- Peter Štih (b. 1960)
- Mitja Ferenc (b. 1960)
- Andrej Studen (1963–2022)
- Taja Kramberger (b. 1970)
