= List of Slovenian scientists =

This is a list of lists of Slovene scientists by field of work.

== Natural sciences ==
- List of Slovenian astronomers
- List of Slovenian biologists
- List of Slovenian chemists
- List of Slovenian geographers and geologists
- List of Slovenian mathematicians
- List of Slovenian physicists

== Social sciences ==
- List of Slovenian art historians
- List of Slovenian historians
- List of Slovenian linguists and philologists
- List of Slovenian literary historians and critics
- List of Slovenian psychiatrists and psychologists
- List of Slovenian sociologists

== See also ==
- List of Slovenes
