= Taja Kramberger =

Slovenian writer and historian

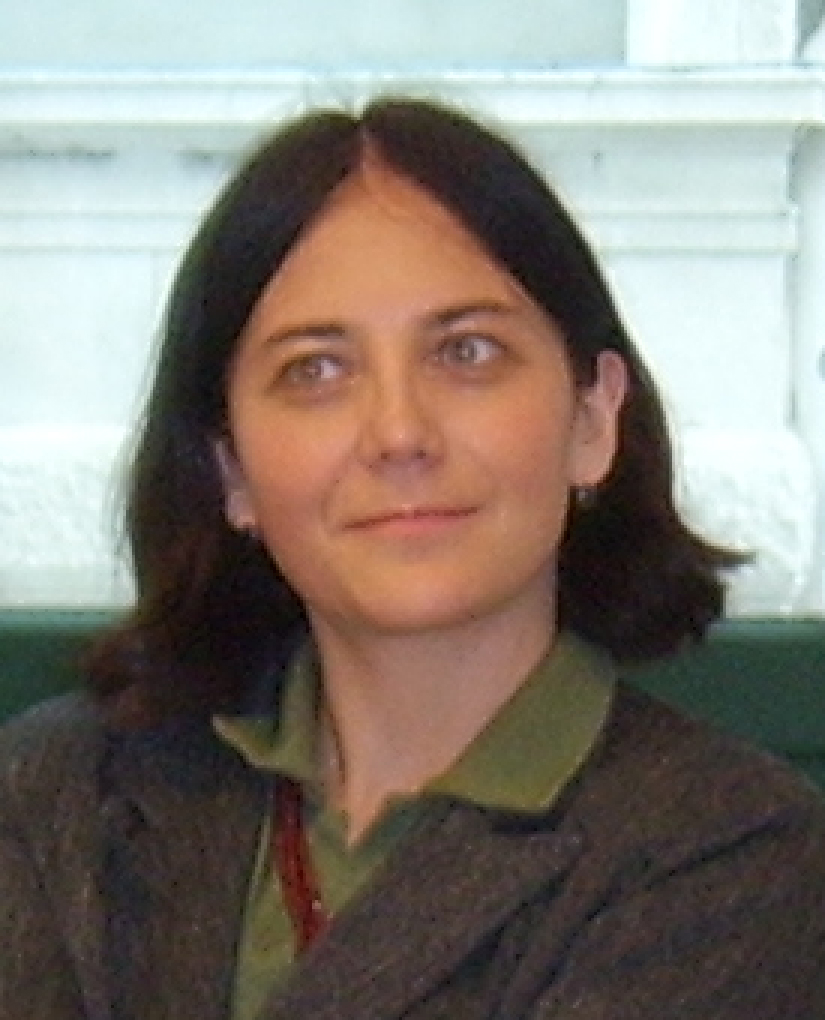
- Taja Kramberger in 2008
- Born: 11 September 1970 (age 55); Ljubljana, SR Slovenia, SFR Yugoslavia

Academic work
- School or tradition: French epistemology, Annales School, Bourdieuian and Foucauldian apparatus, theory of discourse, anthropology of sex and gender
- Main interests: History of oblivion, strategies of social exclusion, history of women, epistemology of social sciences, relationship history and memory, provincialism as a specific phenomenon
- Notable ideas: Reflexivity in historiography, transformative & transfirmative discursive formations, conceptualization of province and provincialism

Taja Kramberger (born 11 September 1970, Ljubljana, Slovenia) is a Slovenian poet, translator, essayist and historical anthropologist from Slovenia. She lives in France.

== Biography ==
=== Early life and education ===
Kramberger was born in Ljubljana, Slovenia. Kramberger spent her childhood (between the ages of four and eleven) in the seaside bilingual old-Venetian town of Koper near Trieste. She finished four years of primary school there (Pinko Tomažič Primary School), and then moved with her family to Ljubljana. There she completed primary and secondary school at Bežigrad Grammar School.

Kramberger completed undergraduate studies in history at the University of Ljubljana. She obtained her PhD in 2009 in history/historical anthropology at the University of Primorska with the thesis Memory and Remembrance. Historical Anthropology of the Canonized Reception.

=== Academic career ===
Kramberger took a position as a postgraduate researcher at the Institutum Studiorum Humanitatis (ISH) in Ljubljana. There she founded the anthropological journal Monitor ISH. She moved to Koper-Capodistria and was involved in establishing the historical anthropology program from undergraduate to postgraduate level in the Department of Anthropology at the University of Primorska.

Besides in literature and historical anthropology, Kramberger continues to be engaged in civil actions, and confrontations against clientelism and corruption in the scientific domain in Slovenia. In May 2000, together with Sabina Mihelj, she co-directed a large public manifestation with a cultural program in Ljubljana against the corrupted politics of the Ministry of Science and Technology. In 2004, she fought against the illegal takeover of the institution ISH. She insisted on publishing all crucial documents, personal testimonies of the takeover, and reflections of the events from the perspective of the people who finally left the ISH from indignation with their ex-colleagues. In 2010 she again was an active militant against the total neoliberalization, venalization, and degradation of the university as an autonomous institution and against the decomposition of its fundamental scientific disciplines at the Faculty of Human Sciences Koper, University of Primorska.

The same regressive social changes occurred simultaneously also in the literary field in Slovenia. In 2004 writer and translator Iztok Osojnik, as a director of the Vilenica International Literary Festival, was ousted from the position of Vilenica's director of the Slovene Writers' Association (SWA). She was among the tiny minority who supported him against mostly state-implemented and state-maintained elite and all-regime-supported writers and authors. Meanwhile the majority of writers remained quiet – also around two then ardently debated subjects of growing nationalism and humiliation of women writers and translators in the frames of the SWA. After that Kramberger distanced herself from the SWA network. She writes and translates literature by her own vocation and ethical standards.

Since living in France (from 2012) she also stepped out of the SWA with an open letter in December 2014 (denied by all Slovene mass-media and suppressed by the president of the SWA) representing only herself and her apatrid chair in Paris. As she writes in one of her poems: Nothing remains./ But life is still here,/ and it speaks the guerrilla alphabet. (...) I am without home,/ I belong to / the invisible community of the banished./ Remove the ethnic adjective / from my name.

She was an initiator and for ten years editor-in-chief of Monitor ISH-Review of Humanities and Social Sciences (2001–2003), in 2004 renamed to Monitor ZSA-Review for Historical, Social and Other Anthropologies (2004–2010). Between 2004 and 2007 she was president of the TROPOS-Association for Historical, Social and Other Anthropologies and for Cultural Activities (Ljubljana, Slovenia).

She publishes monographs in the areas of epistemology of social sciences and historiography, history and historical anthropology of various subjects for the period from the 18th to mid-20th centuries. She is also an internationally acclaimed writer. Kramberger writes literary books, literary studies and essays. She translates texts from all these fields from English, French, Italian, and Spanish into Slovenian.

Kramberger earned scientific and literary fellowships abroad at the École des hautes études en sciences sociales and Maison des sciences de l'homme in Paris, at Collegium Budapest in Budapest, from Edition Thanhäuser in Ottensheim, Austria, from Festival international de la poésie de Trois-Rivières in Canada. She also publishes scientific and literary articles, essays and translations. She participates in international scientific and literary conferences, research projects, and is a member of professional associations and organizations. Kramberger has helped to organize international conferences, for example Territorial and Imaginary Frontiers and Identities from Antiquity until Today, accent on Balkans (2002 in Ljubljana) and the international scientific conference of the Francophonie (AUF) titled Histoire de l'oubli/History of Oblivion (2008 in Koper).

Her research fields are: epistemology of historiography and social sciences, historical anthropology, contemporary history from the Enlightenment to the mid-20th century, transmission and politics of memory/oblivion, intellectual history and cultural transfers in Europe, anti-intellectualism, dimensions and representations of the Dreyfus Affair in Slovenian social space and in Trieste, mechanisms of social exclusion, extermination, genocide and Shoah/Holocaust studies, anthropology of sex and gender, constitution of (national and transnational) literary fields in Europe in the 19th and 20th centuries, studies of province and provincialism as a specific socio-historical phenomenon.

Since October 2012 she has lived in France together with her husband Drago Braco Rotar, professor of sociology, historical anthropology, translator and a renowned public intellectual in Slovenia and Yugoslavia – who during the 1980s and early 1900s established many key institutions in Slovenia and led them for years, including the now classical green translation edition Studia humanitatis, the first private postgraduate school ISH-Institutum Studiorum Humanitatis, Faculty of Graduate Studies in Human Sciences, where he designed and launched the program of historical anthropology).

== History, historical anthropology ==
=== Conceptualization of the collective memory and its distinctions from remembrance and history ===
Kramberger introduced collective memory studies based on the Halbwachsian instrumentarium into Slovenian universities.

In 2000–2001, she wrote an extensive introduction to Maurice Halbwachs' Slovenian translation of La mémoire collective. In this introduction, she pointed out the conceptual difference between memory (mémoire) and remembrance (souvenir). The editorial board of the Slovene Halbwachs translation had unilaterally, despite both the translator (Rotar) and the introductory writer (Kramberger) protesting, decided to translate both mémoire and souvenir into spomin, which means remembrance. Despite this, some researchers, including Marija Jurič Pahor and Samuel Friškič, were able to grasp this difference, which was also related memory and history.

=== Critical reflexivity of the Slovenian historiography ===
Kramberger has also started with the extensive categorical critical reflexivity in the field of history in Slovenia, and has released many angry reactions in the history field, but mostly she left the historians – unable to confront their own shadows from the past – silenced. Although polemic, which would definitely clarify the discipline's past erratic wanderings and amnesias and an almost total theoretic oblivion in the field of history in Slovenia, is not a usual tool of scientific communication in these regions, it is nevertheless clear that Kramberger has opened (among some other researchers, such as Drago Braco Rotar, Rastko Močnik, Maja Breznik, Lev Centrih, Primož Krašovec, in a small, theoretically much less pertinent part also Marta Verginella and Oto Luthar) an important segment of future debates, which are needed to elucidate some of the neglected and spontaneously transmitted chapters of the Slovenian (distinctly ethnocentric and Sonderweg) history.

=== Representations and aspects of the Dreyfus Affair in the Slovenophone World ===
Kramberger was also the first Slovenian historian to write about various dimensions and echoes of the Dreyfus Affair in the Slovenian social space during the affair and later. She has opened up a complex theme of anti-Semitism neglected and only partially elucidated in the Slovene history. She connected this exclusive phenomenon to the categories and imaginary and specific discursive practices. Introducing a research seminar at the undergraduate level, she exposed how anti-Semitic discursive formations can mobilize people and public opinion in countries with few Jewish people. She demonstrated how, even in social spaces with a scarce population of Jews, strong mechanisms of social exclusion nonetheless operate smoothly – often even more aggressively and viscerally than in bigger countries. In the framework of this theme she directed – together with her students in 2007–2008 and 2008–2009 – an ample exhibition on the Dreyfus Affair (1894–1906), showing its entangled and differentiated European context(s), its highly important civic extensions, and its specific reception in the continental Centro-European spaces of Slovenia and Trieste. The latter two were mostly based on spontaneous, normalized and career-promising anti-Semitism, though not at all innocuous. The exhibitions were set up and shown to the public in Koper (2008), Trieste (2009), Maribor (2010) and Murska Sobota (2011).

Kramberger has written numerous critical articles on various aspects of Slovenian history and cultural life, but also on broader European history and culture, e.g. the Spanish Civil War, different models of the Enlightenment in Europe and the recurrent Enlightenment features in the works of Anton Tomaž Linhart, epistemic divergence between the Enlightenment's and Historismus's paradigms of historiography, anthropology of translation, the history of university and the formation of university habitus Habitus, literary and cultural fields Pierre Bourdieu (Théorie des champsà in the 1930s in Slovenia (by then partially covered by the administrative unit of Dravska Banovina) and on the role of women in the constitution of these fields, etc. For years lecturing a course on social and anthropological aspects of women's history and gender constructions, she translated Michelle Perrot's classic work Women or the Silences of History into Slovenian.

=== Bourdieuian studies in the frames of Slovenia ===
She is partly connected to the Bourdieuian perspective and apparatus in social sciences. She has written about Pierre Bourdieu and Loïc Wacquant, translated some of their texts (as a guest editor of the journal Družboslovne razprave, no. 43, 2003), and in 2006 edited a monograph titled Principles of Reflexive Social Science and for a Critical Investigation of Symbolic Dominations (Načela za refleksivno družbeno znanost in kritično preučevanje simbolnih dominacij) (in Slovenian, together with Drago Braco Rotar). She held lectures – among other subjects – on Bourdieuian approach, instrumentarium and methodology at the University of Primorska in Koper.

== Literature ==
=== Poetry ===
She has published eight books of poetry. Her poems have been translated in more than twenty-five languages and published in different literary journals, anthologies in Slovenia and abroad. Book selections of her poetry came out in Hungarian (Ezernyi csend : válogatott versek, Pannónia könyvek, Pécs, Pro Pannonia Kiadói Alapítvány, 2008, ISBN 978-963-9893-07-8) and Croatian (Mobilizacije, Naklada Lara, Zagreb, 2008, tr. Ksenija Premur, ISBN 978-953-7289-31-7). She has been an invited guest of around 100 international literary meetings and festivals in Europe (Belgium, England, Lithuania, Portugal, Croatia, Latvia, France, Hungary, Italy, Austria, Germany, Croatia, North Macedonia, France, Lithuania, Finland, Ireland, etc.) and Canada (Quebec and Ontario).

Kramberger, received the Veronika Award (2007) for the best poetry collection of 2006.

=== Translations, organizations of cultural events ===
Next to numerous translated poems and some prose texts of other writers published in journals, she translated into Slovene a poetry book by Italian poet Michele Obit (Leta na oknu, ZTT EST, Trieste, 2001, ISBN 88-7174-054-8), a selection of poetry by Argentinian poet Roberto Juarroz for the book Vertikalna poezija (Vertical Poetry – with her introduction, ŠZ, Ljubljana, 2006, ISBN 961-242-035-1), a book by Gao Xingjian (Ribiška palica za starega očeta/Buying a Fishing Rod for My Grandfather, 1986–1990, from French together with Drago Braco Rotar) (Didakta, Radovljica, 2001, ISBN 961-6363-62-X), a book of poetry written by Lithuanian poet Neringa Abrutyte (Izpoved, CSK, Aleph, Ljubljana, 2004, ISBN 961-6036-50-5) and a book of fairy tales for kids by Lucy Coats (100 grških mitov za otroke/Atticus the Storyteller, 2004; MK, Ljubljana, 2004, reprinted in 2009, ISBN 978-86-11-16964-4).

In 2002, Kramberger directed and coordinated an international project of poets and translators (22 from 10 countries), Linguaggi di-versi / Different Languages / Različni jeziki / Langages di-vers, in the seaside town of Ankaran near Koper in Slovenia. The project established a series of translation workshops between 1999 and 2004 in Central Europe (Bulgaria, Hungary, Slovenia, Italy and Austria). In 2004 the publication Različni jeziki / Linguaggi di-versi / Different Languages / Langages di-vers in 10 languages came out of the project. It was published by the Edition Libris Koper and edited by Kramberger and Gašper Malej. Anne Talvaz, a French writer and translator, and Bulgarian translator Stefka Hrusanova have broadened the scope of the workshop and organized presentations in Spain (Barcelona) and Italy (Milan) in 2008 and 2010.

Another large international project Kramberger conducted in 2006 was a Slovenian segment of the international project Sealines / Morske linije / Linee di mare, which through one-month literary residences in six European bilingual ports (Cardiff, Galway, Helsinki, Koper, Riga, and Valletta) connected writers from six European states. The project was supported by the program Culture 2000 of the European Union, and was led by the LAF – Literature Across Frontiers office in UK, Manchester. In Slovenia it was executed by the Association Tropos and its then-president Kramberger.

From 2007 to 2009, Kramberger was a president of the Collegium artium (CA) – an association of teachers and students at the Faculty of Human Sciences Koper, University of Primorska, aimed at organizing different cultural and social events at the faculty (literary readings, music concerts, theater and film performances, round tables, conferences, commemorations, exhibitions of figurative arts, other specialized exhibitions etc.). In the frames of the institution CA more than 150 cultural events took place in less than two years.

== Nominations, awards, fellowships ==
=== Literary ===
- September 1997: final circle nomination for the Book Fair Award for the First Literary Book
- November 1998: final circle nomination for the Jenko Award
- Spring 2001: Literary Fellowship of the Bibliophilic Edition Thanhäuser in Ottensheim & KulturKontakt Austria
- 2005: State Fellowship (Ministry of Culture, Republic of Slovenia) for the topmost artistic achievements in Slovenia
- 2007: Veronika Award, Celje (for the poetry book Everyday Conversations, 2006)

=== Scholarly ===
- 1998: Paris (École d’Automne: L’État et le Politique. Histoire et nouveaux modèles)
- 1999: Paris (fellowship of the Ambassade de France en Slovénie, EHESS
- 2001: Budapest (in April: 4th International Winter School at Collegium Budapest Multiple Antiquities–Multiple Modernities)
- 2001–2002: Paris (MSH)
- 2003: Budapest (five months junior fellow at the Collegium Budapest Institute for Advanced Study)
- 2005–2006: Paris (MSH EHESS)

== Works ==
=== Poetry ===
- Marcipan (Marzipan), 1997 (in Slovene)
- Spregovori morje (The Sea Says), 1999 (in Slovene)
- Gegenstroemung/Protitok (Contra-Courant), 2001 (in German, Edition Thanhäuser, Ottensheim)
- Žametni indigo (Velure Indigo), 2004 (in Slovene)
- Mobilizacije/Mobilizations/Mobilisations/Mobilitazioni in 2004–2005 (in Slovene, French, English, and Italian)
- Vsakdanji pogovori (Everyday Conversations) in 2006 (in Slovene)
- Opus quinque dierum in 2009 (poetic echos to the Deyfus Affair, in Slovene)
- ♣stava ♣♣publike ♣♣♣♣♣ni♣♣ in 2010 (blackout poetry from a Constitution of RS and some other legal texts, in Slovene).

=== Literary studies, essays and criticism ===
- "Aberaciji v slovenski poeziji: ženska in vednost : ali Nekaj tez o reakcionarni kulturni revoluciji, ki smo ji priča" ("Aberrations in Slovenian Poetry: Woman and Knowledge. Some theses on reactionary revolution to which we bear witness"), Literatura, July/August 2003, vol. 15, no. 145/146, 1–9.
- "Pesmi, ki (si) jih deliš z dežjem" ("Poems, that you share with rain"), an introductory study to the poetry book of Gašper Malej, in: Gašper Malej, Otok, slutnje, poljub, (Zbirka Lambda, 39). Ljubljana, Škuc, 2004, 110–133.
- "Kjer ni spoznavne realnosti, ne more biti zgodovine (žensk) in ne samozavedajoče se družbe" ("Where there's no cognitive reality, there can be neither history [of women] nor selfconscious society"), Apokalipsa, 2005, no. 90/91/92, 103–119.
- "Kjer pisava okuži pokrajino: spremna študija", ("Where the writing infects the landscape") an introductory study to the Slovenian translation of the selected poems of the Argentinian poet Roberto Juarroz, in: Roberto Juarroz, Vertikalna poezija, (Knjižna zbirka Beletrina). Ljubljana, Študentska založba, 2006, 181–222.
- "Strangoliert!", Apokalipsa, September–November 2007, no. 113/115, 1-23.
- "Similis simili gaudet. Ali o kerkopski literarni kritiki v slovenskem literarnem polju" ("Similis simili gaudet. On the Kercopian Literary Criticism in the Slovenian Literary Field"), Poetikon, no. 19/20, 2008, 150–193.

=== Literary editorship ===
- 2004: Co-editor with Gašper Malej of the collection Različni jeziki / Linguaggi di-versi, publication of the Poets' and Translators' Workshop Različni jeziki / Linguaggi di-versi, held in Ankaran, Slovenia, in 2002. The project Linguaggi di-versi continued with some pauses from 1998 to 2009), Knjigarna Libris, Koper, 221 p.
- 2004: Editor of public documentation and texts in connection to the literary polemics in summer 2004, concerning many issues, including an Open letter to the Minister of Culture Mrs. Andreja Rihter written by the literary creators on 6 July 2004: Dosjeji I, Apokalipsa, 2004, no. 84/85, 139–182.
- 2006: Editor and translator of selected poems by the Argentinian poet Roberto Juarroz, Vertikalna poezija, (Knjižna zbirka Beletrina). Ljubljana, Študentska založba, 2006. 224 p. ISBN 961-242-035-1.
- 2008: Literary editor of the portraits and presentations of poet Joël Pourbaix, short-story writer Hiromi Goto and novelist Dionne Brand, Monitor ZSA, 2008, vol. 10, no. 3/4, 141–151, 153–159, 160–166.

=== Scholarly research ===
==== Principal publications ====
- Taja Kramberger and Drago Braco Rotar (dir. and co-tr.), Načela za refleksivno družbeno znanost in kritično preučevanje simbolnih dominacij [Principles for a Reflexive Social Science and for a Critical Investigation of Symbolic Dominations], (translations of Pierre Bourdieu's and Loïc Wacquant's selected texts), Library Annales Majora, Koper, University of Primorska, Publishing House Annales, 2006, 262 p., ISBN 961-6033-87-5.
- Taja Kramberger, Historiografska divergenca : razsvetljenska in historistična paradigma : o odprti in zaprti epistemični strukturi in njunih elaboracijah (Historiographical Divergence: the Enlightenment and Historismus Paradigm: On an Opened and a Closed Epistemic Structure and Their Elaborations), Library Annales Majora, Koper, University of Primorska, Publishing House Annales, 2007, 384 p., ISBN 978-961-6033-93-0
- Taja Kramberger, Zgodovinskoantropološko oblikovanje univerzitetnih habitusov (Historico-anthropological Formation of the University Habiti/La formation historico-anthropologique des habiti universitaires), Pedagoški institut, Ljubljana, 2009, 131 p.
- Taja Kramberger and Drago Braco Rotar, Univerza: kolegij ali dresura. O univerzitetni avtonomiji in njenih nasprotjih (University: Collegium or Training? On the University Autonomy and its Contraries), Univerza v Ljubljani, Ljubljana, 2010. In preparation for print.
- Taja Kramberger and Drago Braco Rotar, Misliti družbo, ki (se) sama ne misli (Think the Society, which does not think (by) itself), Založba Sophia, Ljubljana, 2010. In preparation for print.

==== Selection of articles ====
- Taja Kramberger and Drago Rotar, "Pravice vs toleranca. Mentalitetna inkongruentnost: zgodovinskoantropološke marginalije k slovenskemu prevodu Deklaracije o pravicah človeka in državljana z dne 26. 8. 1789" (Rights vs Tolerance. Incongruity of Mentalities: Historico-anthropological Marginalia on Slovenian Translation of the Declaration of the Rights of Man and the Citizen from 26 August 1789), Šolsko polje / School Field, vol. XXI, no. 3–4, 2010, 36 p.
- Taja Kramberger and Drago Rotar, "Evropa gre v Šanghaj. Vdor neoliberalizma in cerkva v akademski svet" (Europe Goes to Shanghai. Invasion of neoliberalism and churches in the academic world), Sodobna pedagogika, vol. XVI, no. 4, 2010, 31 p.
- Taja Kramberger and Drago Rotar, "Merilska blaznost ali o sprevrženi rabi znanstvenega orodja" (Insanity of Measurement. On the Deteriorated Use of Scientific Tools), Šolsko polje/School Field, vol. XXI, no. 1–2, 2010, 42 p.
- Taja Kramberger, "Naporni itinerarij španske državljanske vojne: kraji memorije na poti slovenskih republikancev v Španijo in vloga Pariza pri mednarodni rekrutaciji španskih borcev" (I faticosi itinerari della guerra civile spagnola: i luoghi della memoria lungo i tragitti dei repubblicani sloveni verso la Spagna e il ruolo di Parigi nel reclutamento di volontari per la Spagna / El estenuante itinerario de la Guerra Civil Española. Lugares de la memoria en el camino a España de los republicanes sloveno y el papel de Paris en el reclutamento internacional de Combatientes Españoles). Zbornik referatov s simpozija 12. februarja 2010, Koper: Zveza borcev Koper-Capodistria, 2010, 100–140.
- Taja Kramberger, "Les lieux d'oubli : repères pour la recherche sur l'affaire Dreyfus dans l'historiographie slovène", in: VAUDAY, Patrick (ur.), MOČNIK, Rastko (ur.), ZUPANC EĆIMOVIĆ, Paula (ur.), ROTAR, Drago B. (ur.). Histoire de l'oubli en contextes postsocialiste et postcolonial, (Knjižnica Annales Majora). Koper: Université de Primorska, Centre de recherches scientifiques, Maison d'édition Annales: Société d'historie de Primorska Sud, 2009, 189–213. [COBISS.SI-ID 1752275]
- Taja Kramberger, "Iz zgodovine intelektualcev : afera Dreyfus in francoski zgodovinarji" (From the History of Intellectuals : the Dreyfus Affair and French Historians), Monitor ZSA, 2008, vol. 10, no. 1/2, pp. 25–81, ilustr. [COBISS.SI-ID 1592275]
- Taja Kramberger, "Afera Dreyfus in tiskani mediji" (The Dreyfus Affair and Printed Media), Media Watch, 2008.
- Taja Kramberger and Drago Rotar, "Prehodi, prevodi, transferji : nekaj refrakcij skozi tekste in kontekste ob prevodih Pierra Bourdieuja in Loïca Wacquanta" (Passages, traductions, transferts : quelques réfractions à travers les textes et contextes à propos des traductions de Pierre Bourdieu et Loïc Wacquant). In: KRAMBERGER, Taja & ROTAR, Drago B. (dir.), BOURDIEU, Pierre, WACQUANT, Loïc, Načela za refleksivno družbeno znanost in kritično preučevanje simbolnih dominacij, (Knjižnica Annales Majora). Koper: Univerza na Primorskem, Znanstveno-raziskovalno središče, Založba Annales: Zgodovinsko društvo za južno Primorsko, 2006, 9–34. [COBISS.SI-ID 1213651]
- Taja Kramberger, Sabina Mihelj and Drago Rotar, "Representations of the Nation and of the Other in the Slovenian Periodical Press before and after 1991: Engagements and Implications", In: SPASSOV, Orlin (ur.), Quality press in Southeast Europe, (The media in Southeast Europe), 1st ed. Sofia: Südosteuropäisches Medienzentrum, 2004, 276–305. [COBISS.SI-ID 216577280]
- Taja Kramberger, "Možnost in nujnost kritičnega intelektualca : k prevodoma Bourdieuja in Wacquanta" (Possibilité et nécessité de l’intellectuel critique : à propos des traductions de Bourdieu et Wacquant), Družboslovne razprave, August 2003, vol. 19, no. 43, 49–55. [COBISS.SI-ID 595667]
- Taja Kramberger, "Od Joining the Club h grotesknosti slovenske adaptacije na neoliberalizem"/"From Joining the Club to the Grotesque Slovenian Adaptation to Neoliberalisme"/"De L'adhésion au club à la grotesque adaptation slovène au néolibéralisme", Družboslovne razprave, vol. 19, no. 43, August 2003, 77–95. [COBISS.SI-ID 595923]
- Taja Kramberger, "L'inversion dans l'objectivation. : le mouvement régressif d'une culture provinciale faisant office de la culture nationale"/Inverzija v objektivizaciji : regresivno gibanje provincialne kulture, ki nastopa v vlogi nacionalne kulture – povzetek, Monitor ISH, vol. IV, no. 1–4, 2002, 53–70. [COBISS.SI-ID 21359202]
- Taja Kramberger, "Doxa et fama. O produkciji "javnega mnenja" in strategijah pozabe – elementi za mikroštudijo"/"Doxa et fama. On production of "Public opinion" and Strategies of Oblivion"/"Doxa et fama. Sur la production de 'l'opinion publique' et sur les stratégies de l'oubli", Družboslovne razprave, vol. XVIII, no. 41, December 2002, 63–100. [COBISS.SI-ID 20786018]
- Taja Kramberger, "Maurice Halbwachs in družbeni okviri kolektivne memorije" (Maurice Halbwachs and the social frames of collective memory/Maurice Halbwachs et les cadres sociaux de la mémoire collective); introduction à la traduction slovène de La mémoire collective de Maurice Halbwachs. In: HALBWACHS, Maurice. Kolektivni spomin [v rokopisu prevoda Draga Braca Rotarja pravilno oddano kot Kolektivna memorija, za poznejši neavtorizirani uredniški poseg prevajalec in avtorica spremne besede ne odgovarjata]. Ljubljana: Studia humanitatis, 2001, 211–258. [COBISS.SI-ID 694925]

==== Scholarly editorship ====
- 2001–2010: Editor-in-chief of Monitor ISH (2001–2003), in 2004 renamed to Monitor ZSA – Revue of Historical, Social and Other Anthropologies (34 numbers)
- 2003: Guest-editor for the theme "Deconstruction of neoliberalism"/"Dekonstrukcija neoliberalizma", Družboslovne razprave [Dissertations in Social Sciences], vol. XIX, no. 43, 2003, pp. 47–95.
- 2006: Co-editor (with Drago braco Rotar) and co-translator in the Slovenian collection of articles by Pierre Bourdieu and Loïc Wacquant, Načela za refleksivno družbeno znanost in kritično preučevanje simbolnih dominacij [Principles for a Reflexive Social Science and for a Critical Investigation of Symbolic Dominations], (translations of Pierre Bourdieu's and Loïc Wacquant's texts), Library Annales Majora, Koper, University of Primorska, Publishing House Annales, 2006, 262 p., ISBN 961-6033-87-5.
- 2009: Member of the Scientific Committee in publication: Patrick Vauday, Rastko Močnik, Paula Zupanc Ećimović, Drago Rotar (dir.), Histoire de l'oubli en contextes postsocialiste et postcolonial, Library Annales Majora, Koper, University of Primorska, Publishing House Annales, 2009, 456 p.

=== Literary references ===
- Jean Boase-Beier, Alexandra Büchler, Fiona Sampson, A Line: New Poetry from Eastern and Central Europe (anthology with a preface by Václav Havel), Arc Publications, UK, 2004, ISBN 1-900072-97-1. URL: https://web.archive.org/web/20110727062630/http://www.arcpublications.co.uk/biography.htm?writer_id=228
- Vid Sagadin, "Iskanje nezasičenih prostorov", Literatura, vol. 17, no. 169–170, July/August 2005, 224–229.
- Peter Semolič, "Sensibility and sharp intellect", Introductory essay of the Poetry International Web, 2005.URL: http://slovenia.poetryinternationalweb.org/piw_cms/cms/cms_module/index.php?obj_id=5026
- Irena Novak Popov, Antologija slovenskih pesnic 3, 1981 – 2000 [Anthology of Slovenian Women Poets 3, 1981 – 2000], Založba Tuma, Ljubljana, 2007, 318–329.
- Jad Hatem, " La pierre de l'invisibilité ", La Poésie slovène contemporaine : l'écriture de la pierre (Portraites littéraires), Éditions du Cygne, Paris, 2010, 11–24.
- Iztok Osojnik, "Pet dni na ladji norcev" [Five days at the Ship of Fools], Apokalipsa, no. 134/135, 2009, 285–295.
- Colleen Mc Carthy, "Storm in Words: Contemporary Slovenian Poetry in Translation", Talisman. A Journal of Contemporary Poetry and Poetics, no. 38/39/40, Summer-Autumn 2010, 350–355.

== See also ==
- Slovenian literature
- List of Slovenian historians
- Slovene Writers' Association
