= List of Slovenian linguists and philologists =

A list of notable linguists and philologists from Slovenia:

== A ==
- Matija Ahacel

== B ==
- Adam Bohorič
- Anton Bezenšek

== Č ==
- Matija Čop

== D ==
- Peter Dajnko

== G ==
- Janez Gradišnik

== J ==
- Anton Janežič
- Primož Jakopin
- Jurij Japelj
- Urban Jarnik

== K ==
- Jernej Kopitar
- Sebastijan Krelj

== L ==
- Rado Lenček
- Fran Levstik
- Tine Logar

== M ==
- Franz Miklosich
- Fran Metelko
- Matija Murko

== O ==
- Janez Orešnik

== P ==
- Marko Pohlin

== R ==
- Fran Ramovš
- Marija Rus

== S ==
- Marko Snoj
- Luka Svetec

== T ==
- Jože Toporišič
