= Matija Majar =

Carinthian Slovene Catholic priest and irredentist (1809–1892)

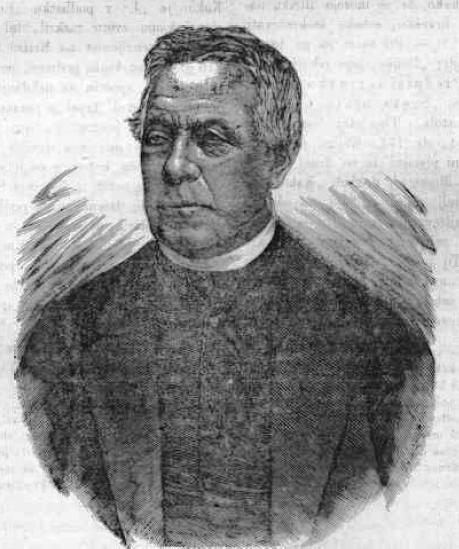
Matija Majar

Matija Majar, also spelled Majer (7 February 1809 – 31 July 1892), pseudonym Ziljski, was a Carinthian Slovene Roman Catholic priest and political activist, best known as the creator of the idea of a United Slovenia.

== Biography ==
Majar was born in the small village of Görtschach (Slovene: Goriče) east of Hermagor-Pressegger See in the Gail Valley (Slovene: Ziljska dolina) in southern Carinthia, then part of the Austrian Empire. He was baptized Mathias Maar. He grew up in a bilingual Slovene-German environment and then attended the lyceum in Klagenfurt and in Graz. During his studies in Klagenfurt, he came under the influence of Anton Martin Slomšek, a Roman Catholic priest and author who propagated the use of Slovene in the public sphere.

Majar served as a priest in Slovene-speaking parishes in Carinthia, first in Rosegg and then in the settlement of Camporosso near Tarvisio in the Canale Valley (now in Italy). In 1837, he moved back to Klagenfurt, where he first worked in the administration of the Diocese of Gurk, and from 1843 as the chaplain of Klagenfurt Cathedral. During his Klagenfurt years, Majar came into contact with several Slovene ethnographers and authors who worked on the revival of the Slovene language and culture, such as Urban Jarnik, Anton Janežič, Matija Ahacel, and Davorin Trstenjak. Influenced by the Illyrian Movement in Croatia, especially by the Slovene-Croatian poet and activist Stanko Vraz, Majar started developing Pan-Slavic ideals.

In the early days of the revolution of 1848, Majar formulated and published a political manifesto demanding the unification of all Slovene Lands into one single politically autonomous administrative entity, called Slovenia. In the following months, Majar's manifesto was elaborated into a program known under the name of United Slovenia.

Because of his radical political activity, Majar was transferred from Klagenfurt to the remote parish of Hohenthurn (Slovene: Straja vas) on the border with Friuli. After more than decade in isolation, in 1867 Majar took part in a journey to Moscow later nicknamed the "Slavic Pilgrimage", where he presented the Gail Valley at the Ethnographic Exhibition. Through this four-week absence without leave from his parish he completely fell out with the church authorities. Majar then returned to public life. He even tried to introduce the Cyrillic script among Slovenes. He published his ethnographic research in several Russian journals, and in 1870, he was offered tenure as professor in Odesa, in the Russian Empire. However, since he was still a Roman Catholic priest, this plan failed as the Russian authorities did not grant him entry to the country. Nevertheless, Majar continued to propagate radical pan-Slavic ideas through the magazine Slavjan (The Slav), which he had founded in 1873. The magazine had limited success and was closed in 1875. In 1885, Majar moved to Prague, where he lived until his death in 1892.

== See also ==
- Romantic nationalism
