= List of Slovenian sociologists =

A list of notable sociologists from Slovenia:

== A ==
- Frane Adam

== B ==
- Katja Boh
- Darko Bratina

== D ==
- Aleš Debeljak

== G ==
- Andrej Gosar
- Pavel Gantar

== K ==
- Taja Kramberger

== L ==
- Thomas Luckmann

== M ==
- Rastko Močnik

== P ==
- Jože Pučnik

== R ==
- Dimitrij Rupel
- Veljko Rus

== S ==
- Andrej Studen

== Š ==
- Igor Škamperle

== T ==
- Gregor Tomc

== U ==
- Aleš Ušeničnik

== Ž ==
- Slavoj Žižek
