= Jarnik =

Jarnik is a surname. Notable people with the surname include:

- Urban Jarnik (1784–1844), Slovenian poet
- Vojtěch Jarník (1897–1970), Czech mathematician

== See also ==
- 4023 Jarník, a main belt asteroid
- Jarník algorithm, algorithm in graph theory developed by Vojtěch
