= Spodnja Sušica =

- Location in Slovenia
- Coordinates: 46°00′33″N 15°41′32″E
- Country: Slovenia
- Traditional region: Styria
- Statistical region: Lower Sava
- Municipality: Brežice
- Elevation: 169 m (554 ft)

Spodnja Sušica (pronounced [ˈspoːdnja suˈʃiːtsa]; German: Untersuschitz) is a former settlement in the Municipality of Brežice in eastern Slovenia. It is now part of the settlement of Bizeljsko. The area is part of the traditional region of Styria. It is now included with the rest of the municipality in the Lower Sava Statistical Region.

== Geography ==
Spodnja Sušica lies southeast of Zgornja Sušica, along the main road from Bizeljsko to Brežice and near Sušica Creek (Slovene: Sušički potok). It includes the hamlets of Gradišče, Zaklen, and Župjek.

== Name ==
The name Spodnja Sušica literally means 'lower Sušica', contrasting with neighboring Zgornja Sušica (literally, 'upper Sušica'), which lies about 190 meters (620 ft) higher in elevation. Zgornja Sušica and Spodnja Sušica were attested in historical records in 1404 as Sussitz. The name Sušica is derived from the Slovene adjective 'suh', originally designating a creek that went dry during the summer, and later a settlement along such a creek.

== History ==
Spodnja Sušica had a population of 177 living in 27 houses in 1869, and 229 living in 36 houses in 1900. Together with Zgornja Sušica, Spodnja Sušica was combined into the newly created settlement of Bizeljsko in 1957, ending its existence as an independent settlement.
