= Boris M. Gombač =

Slovenian historian

Boris M. Gombač (born 15 September 1945) is a Slovene historian from Italy.

He was born to a middle class Slovene family in Trieste, Italy. He studied history at the University of Ljubljana, Slovenia (then part of former Yugoslavia). Between 1975 and 1984, he worked as a researcher at the Institute for the History of Workers' Movement in Ljubljana, now known as the Institute of Contemporary History. Between 1984 and 1994, he served as director of the National Museum of Slovenia. Since 1995, he is a researcher at the Scientific Research Centre of the University of Primorska.

During the difficult process of Slovenia's secession from Yugoslavia, he was active in civil society organizations that worked for the protection and eventual return of Slovenian conscripts drafted in the Yugoslav People's Army.

He wrote about the history of Trieste and the Julian March in the 19th and 20th century, especially the history of the workers' movement and the Italian historiography of Trieste. He was member of the Slovenian-Italian Cultural-Historical Commission, established by the governments of the two countries to shed light on the historical relationship between the two peoples from 1880 to 1954.

He is the father of historian and sociologist Jure Gombač.

== Major works ==
- Trst-Trieste, dve imeni, ena identiteta. Sprehod čez historiografijo o Trstu 1719-1980. ("Trst-Trieste, Two Names, One Identity. An Overview of Historiography on Trieste between 1719 and 1980). Ljubljana - Trieste, 1993.
- Slovenija, Italija : od preziranja do priznanja ("Slovenia-Italy: From Scorn to Recognition"). Ljubljana, 1996.
- Na drugi strani. Odbor staršev za varstvo in vrnitev slovenskih vojakov leta 1991 ("On the Other Side. The Parental Committee for the Protection and Return of Slovenian Soldiers in 1991"). Ljubljana, 2005.

== See also ==
- Jože Pirjevec
- Marta Verginella
