= Fran Ramovš =

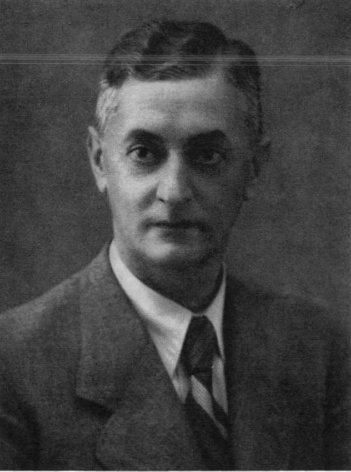
- Born: 14 September 1890; Ljubljana, Carniola, Austria-Hungary
- Died: 16 September 1952 (aged 62); Ljubljana, PR Slovenia, FPR Yugoslavia
- Occupation: linguist

Fran Ramovš (14 September 1890 – 16 September 1952; pen name Julij Dub) was a Slovenian linguist. He studied the dialects and onomastics of Slovene.

== Early life and education ==
Fran Ramovš was born in Ljubljana, the capital of the Duchy of Carniola, Austria-Hungary. He studied linguistics in Vienna (1910–1911) and in Graz (1911–1914). While in Graz he selected the topic of his dissertation (the development of Proto-Slavic reduced vowels in Slovene) and completed it in 1912; he submitted it in 1914 to receive his PhD.

== First World War ==
In October 1915 Ramovš was mobilized and sent to the Isonzo Front, where he was completely incapacitated during the Third Battle of the Isonzo. He spent a year recovering in Vienna, and he was dismissed from regular military service in 1917 on grounds of disability and assigned to the territorial reserve in Ljubljana and Kamnik.

== Academic career ==
In 1918 Ramovš was given a professorship and offered a teaching position as an associate professor in Chernivtsi, Ukraine, but with the collapse of Austria-Hungary he returned from Graz to Ljubljana, where preparations were underway to establish a university.

The University of Ljubljana was founded in 1919, and on 31 August 1919 Ramovš was among the first four full professors appointed at the institution. He was appointed a professor of Indo-European and Slavic linguistics and also taught accentology, general phonetics, Proto-Slavic, and comparative Indo-European grammar. In 1921, the son Primož (1921–1999), the later composer, was born to him.

Ramovš served as chancellor of the University of Ljubljana from 1934 to 1935. He was a co-founder and member of the Slovenian Academy of Sciences and Arts and he served as the chair of the academy from 1950 to 1952. He received the Prešeren Award in 1950 for his work on the Slovene Normative Guide (Slovene: Slovenski pravopis). He was an honorary member of the Slavic Society of Slovenia (Slovene: Slavistično društvo Slovenije).

Ramovš died 16 September 1952 in Ljubljana.

== Commemoration ==
The Fran Ramovš Institute of the Slovene Language (Slovene: Inštitut za slovenski jezik Frana Ramovša ZRC SAZU) is named after Ramovš.

== Selected bibliography ==
- Historična gramatika slovenskega jezika (Historical Grammar of Slovene) (a planned series)
  - Volume 2: Konzonantizem (Consonants; Ljubljana, 1924) COBISS 608257
  - Volume 7: Dialekti (Dialects; Ljubljana, 1935) COBISS 608513, DLIB.si
- Dialektološka karta slovenskega jezika (Slovene Dialect Map; Ljubljana, 1931) COBISS 5433657, DLIB.si
- (with Anton Breznik) Slovenski pravopis (Slovene Normative Guide; Ljubljana, 1935) COBISS 30372353, DLIB.si
- Kratka zgodovina slovenskega jezika (A Short History of Slovene; Ljubljana, 1936) COBISS 122625, DLIB.si
- Morfologija slovenskega jezika (Slovene Morphology; Ljubljana, 1952) COBISS 1100289, DLIB.si

== See also ==
- List of Slovenian linguists and philologists
