= St. Jakob im Rosental =

St. Jakob im Rosental Šentjakob v Rožu
- Municipality
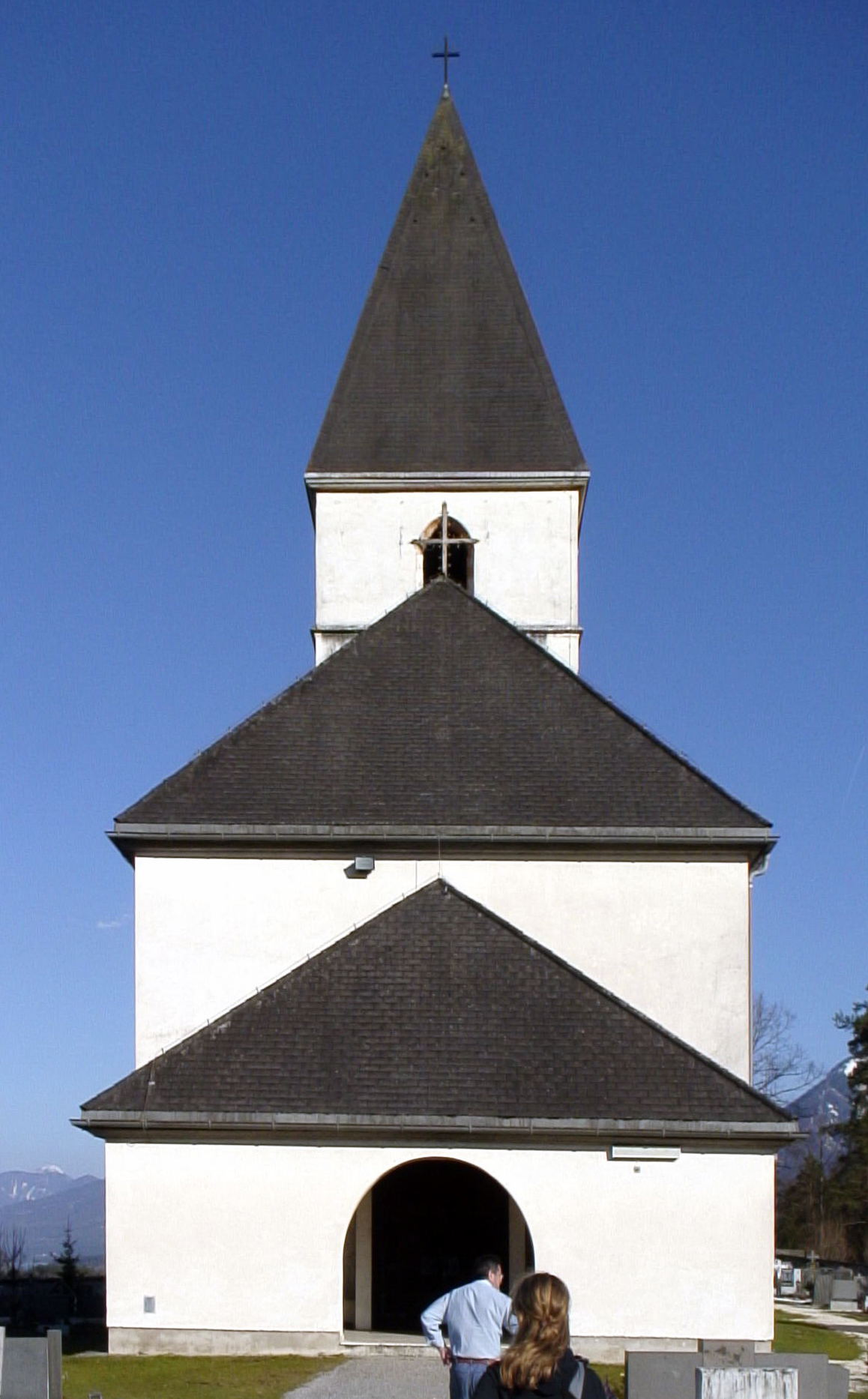
- Sankt Jakob im Rosental parish church

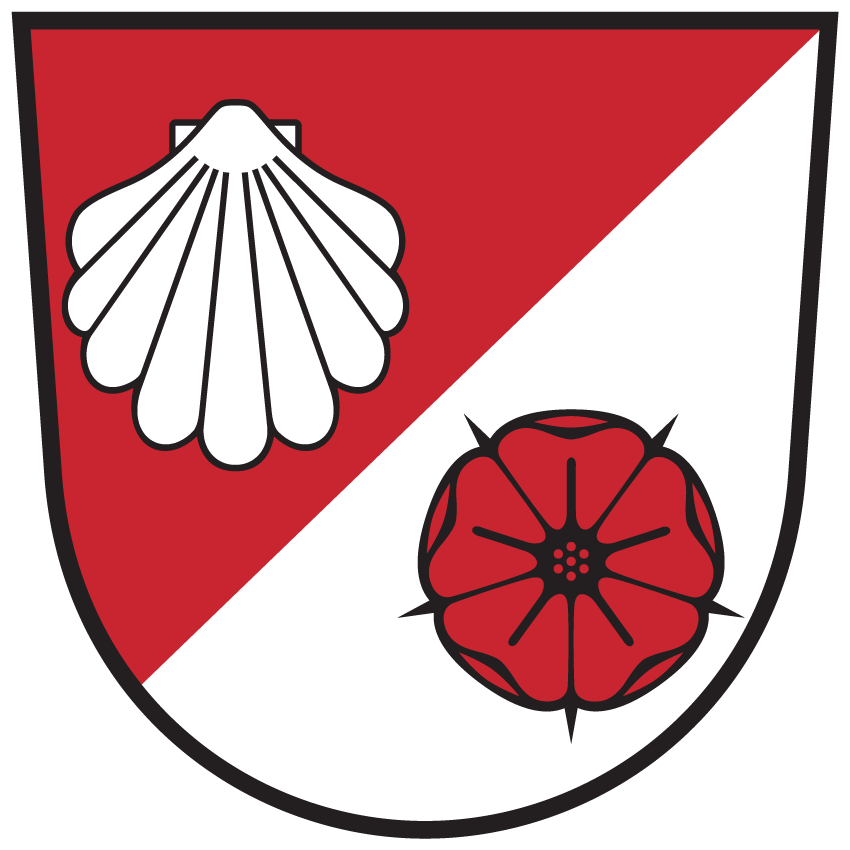
- Coat of arms

- Location within Austria
- Coordinates: 46°32′N 14°3′E
- Country: Austria
- State: Carinthia
- District: Villach-Land

Government
  - Mayor: Guntram Perdacher

Area
  - Total: 78.76 km^{2} (30.41 sq mi)
- Elevation: 480 m (1,570 ft)

Population (2018-01-01)
  - Total: 4,245
  - Density: 53.90/km^{2} (139.6/sq mi)
- Time zone: UTC+1 (CET)
  - Summer (DST): UTC+2 (CEST)
- Postal code: 9184
- Area code: 04253
- Website: www.st-jakob-ros.at

St. Jakob im Rosental (Slovene: Šentjakob v Rožu) is a town in the district of Villach-Land in the Austrian state of Carinthia.

== Geography ==
The municipality borders on Slovenia in the south, and the northern boundary is formed by the Drau River. It lies in the western part of the Rosen valley.

== Population ==
According to the 2001 census 16.4% of the population are Carinthian Slovenes.

== History ==
In the Carinthian Plebiscite of 1920, St. Jakob was one of the 17 Carinthian municipalities, where the majority of the population (54%) voted for the annexation to the Kingdom of Serbs, Croats and Slovenes (Yugoslavia).
However, since 59% of the voters in the entire voting zone A were in favour of remaining with Austria, the municipal area also remained with Carinthia.

== Personalities ==
Among the famous natives of the municipality were the Slovene philologists Matija Ahacel and Anton Janežič.
