= Vasko Simoniti =

Slovenian historian and politician

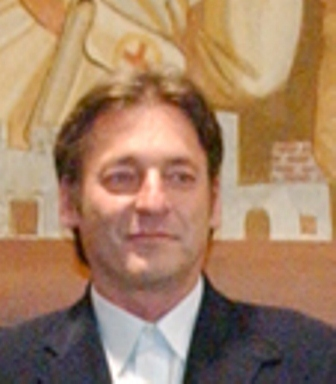
Vasko Simoniti, 2004

Vasko Simoniti (born 23 March 1951) is a Slovenian historian and politician. Between 2004 and 2008, he served as the Minister of Culture of Slovenia, being reappointed in 2020. He is an active member of the Slovenian Democratic Party.

== Early life and academic career ==
Simoniti was born in Ljubljana as the son of the renowned composer and choir leader Rado Simoniti who had moved to the Slovenian capital from the Goriška region in the 1930s in order to escape the violent policies of Fascist Italianization in the Julian March. Vasko attended the Classical Lyceum of Ljubljana. He studied at the University of Ljubljana, graduating with a degree in history in 1977. After a short period of work in the public administration of the Socialist Republic of Slovenia, he started teaching at the Ljubljana University in 1981. In 1989 he obtained his PhD at the same university and started teaching history, specializing in Slovenian history from the 16th to the 18th century.

As a historian, he dedicated himself mostly to the history of Slovene Lands in the early modern period, especially the relations of the Slovene Lands and the Ottoman Empire. He has also written on problems of methodology and epistemology in historical sciences. In the late 1990s, he was the co-author, together with the writer and public intellectual Drago Jančar and journalist and historian Alenka Puhar, of the exhibition "The Dark Side of the Moon" (Slovene: Temna stran meseca) on the authoritarian and totalitarian elements of the Communist dictatorship in the former Yugoslavia, with an emphasis on Slovenia.

== Political activity ==
He first became actively involved in politics in the parliamentary elections of 2000, when he ran unsuccessfully for the Slovenian National Assembly on the list of the Social Democratic Party of Slovenia (now known as the Slovenian Democratic Party). In the presidential elections of 2002, he served as the chief advisor of the centre-right candidate Barbara Brezigar who eventually lost against the centre-left candidate Janez Drnovšek. In 2004, he was among the co-founders of the liberal conservative civic platform Rally for the Republic (Slovene: Zbor za republiko). Later in the same year, he became the Minister for Culture in the centre-right government led by prime minister Janez Janša. After the victory of the left-wing coalition in 2008, he was replaced by Majda Širca. In 2020, he was reappointed as Minister for Culture.

== Personal life ==
He is married to the journalist and TV host Alenka Zor Simoniti. He is the brother of the diplomat Iztok Simoniti and cousin of the philologist and translator Primož Simoniti.

Besides Slovene, he is fluent in English, German, French, Italian and Serbo-Croatian.

== Selected bibliography ==
- Turki so v deželi že: Turški vpadi na slovensko ozemlje v 15. in 16. stoletju ("The Turks are Already in the Land: Ottoman Incursions in the Slovene Territory in the 15th and 16th Century"; Celje, 1990);
- Vojaška organizacija v 16. stoletju na Slovenskem ("Military Organization in the Slovene Lands in the 16th Century; Ljubljana, 1991);
- Slovenska zgodovina do razsvetljenstva ("Slovenian History until the Enlightenment", with Peter Štih; Ljubljana & Klagenfurt, 1995);
- Fanfare nasilja. Razprave in eseji. ("Fanfare of Violence. Treatises and Essays"; Ljubljana, 2003);
- Slowenische Geschichte : Gesellschaft - Politik - Kultur ("Slovenian History: Society - Politics - Culture", with Peter Štih and Peter Vodopivec; Graz, 2008).

== See also ==
- List of Slovenian historians
- Politics of Slovenia

Political offices
Preceded by Andreja Rihter	Minister of Culture of the Republic of Slovenia; November 2004 - November 2008	Succeeded by Majda Širca
