= Zgornja Sušica =

- Location in Slovenia
- Coordinates: 46°01′09″N 15°40′19″E
- Country: Slovenia
- Traditional region: Styria
- Statistical region: Lower Sava
- Municipality: Brežice
- Elevation: 357 m (1,171 ft)

Zgornja Sušica (pronounced [ˈzɡoːɾnja suˈʃiːtsa]; in older sources also Gornja Sušica, German: Obersuschitz) is a former settlement in the Municipality of Brežice in eastern Slovenia. It is now part of the settlement of Bizeljsko. The area is part of the traditional region of Styria. It is now included with the rest of the municipality in the Lower Sava Statistical Region.

== Geography ==
Zgornja Sušica is a scattered settlement northwest of Spodnja Sušica, in the hills between Dramlja Creek to the west and, to the east, the main road from Bizeljsko to Brežice. It includes the hamlets of Boršt, Gradišče, Janževa Gor(i)ca, Nimnik, Sveti Vid, Sušica, and Vrhovnica.

== Name ==
The name Zgornja Sušica literally means 'upper Sušica', contrasting with neighboring Spodnja Sušica (literally, 'lower Sušica'), which lies about 190 meters (620 ft) lower in elevation. Zgornja Sušica and Spodnja Sušica were attested in historical records in 1404 as Sussitz. The name Sušica is derived from the Slovene adjective 'suh', originally designating a creek that went dry during the summer, and later a settlement along such a creek.

== History ==
Zgornja Sušica had a population of 447 living in 93 houses in 1869, and 581 living in 112 houses in 1900. Together with Spodnja Sušica, Zgornja Sušica was combined into the newly created settlement of Bizeljsko in 1957, ending its existence as an independent settlement.

== Church ==
The church in Zgornja Sušica is dedicated to Saint Vitus. It stands in the hamlet of Sveti Vid. The structure dates back at least to the 16th century, and the remnants of defensive walls that surrounded the church during the time of the Ottoman raids are visible. It has an octagonal chancel with three bays and a barrel-vaulted nave.

== Notable people ==
Notable people that were born or lived in Zgornja Sušica include the following:

- Avgust Remec (1867–1920), composer and music teacher, active in Zagreb
