= Anton Janežič =

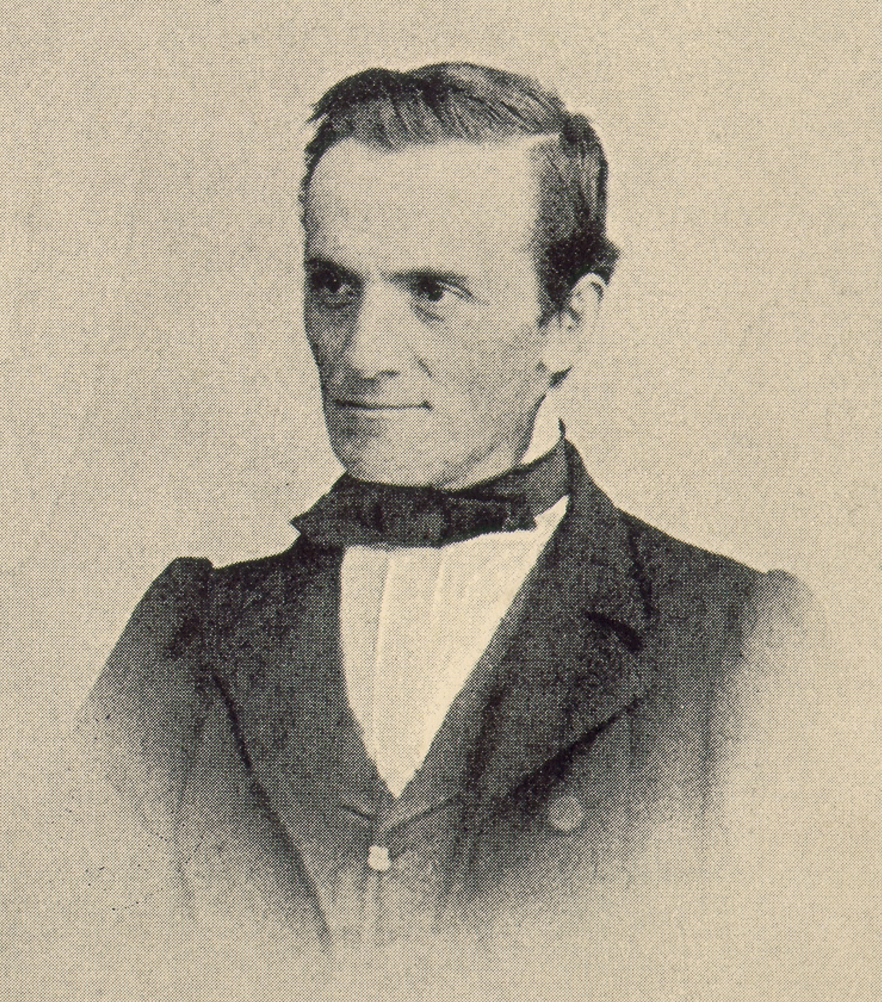
Anton Janežič, 1861

Anton Janežič, also known in German as Anton Janeschitz (19 December 1828 – 18 September 1869), was a Carinthian Slovene linguist, philologist, author, editor, literary historian and critic.

== Life ==
Janežič was born in a peasant family in the village of Lessach (Slovene: Leše) near St. Jakob im Rosental (Slovene: Št. Jakob v Rožu) in Carinthia. He attended the grammar school in Klagenfurt. In 1848, when Slovene was introduced in school, Janežič was employed as professor of Slovene at the Klagenfurt lyceum. In 1851 he began to study linguistics and Slavic philology at the University of Vienna under the supervision of Franz Miklosich. In 1854 he returned to Klagenfurt, where he continued to teach Slovene, German, and history at the lyceum until 1866 when he resigned because of illness. He died three years later in Klagenfurt, where he was also buried. In the 1870s, he was reburied in his local parish of St. Jakob.

== Work ==
Janežič entered the public life after the Spring of Nations, when he became a close collaborator of the fellow Carinthian countryman Matija Majar, the author of the program of United Slovenia. In 1851 he started compiling a German–Slovene dictionary, based on the work of Ožbalt Gutsman, Marko Pohlin, Matija Ahacel, Jernej Kopitar, and Urban Jarnik, completing it in 1854 under the advice of Franz Miklosich and Franc Serafin Metelko. The same year, he also published a grammar of Slovene, which was used in Slovene-language schools until the 1920s.

In 1850, Janežič launched the literary magazine Slovenska bčela (The Slovene Bee), which published the works of important contemporary Slovene authors, such as Josipina Turnograjska, Miroslav Vilhar, Fran Levstik, Janez Trdina and Andrej Einspieler. In 1858, the magazine merged with the journal Vaje edited by Simon Jenko, Valentin Zarnik, and Janez Mencinger, to form the magazine Slovenski glasnik (The Slovene Herald), which attracted the collaboration of many important authors, including Fran Erjavec and Josip Jurčič. Between 1861 and 1868 the journal also published the book collection Cvetje iz domačih in tujih logov (Flowers from Home and Abroad) which issued several important books of Slovene authors and translation of classical authors such as Sophocles, Plato, Virgil, Andersen, Lermontov, and others. After retiring in 1866, he left the editorship to Josip Stritar.

In 1851, Janežič founded the Hermagoras Society, the oldest Slovene publishing house, together with Andrej Einspieler and Anton Martin Slomšek. In addition, he collaborated with Matija Ahacel and Anton Martin Slomšek in preserving the folk traditions of Slovenes in Carinthia and Lower Styria. He was also the first to give a complete translation of the Freising Manuscripts, the oldest document in Slovene and the first Roman-script record of any Slavic language, into modern Slovene.

== Sources ==
- Janko Kos, Slovenska književnost (Ljubljana: Cankarjeva založba, 1982), 121.
