= List of Slovenian art historians =

A list of notable Slovenian art historians:

== C ==
- Izidor Cankar

== K ==
- Miklavž Komelj

== M ==
- Marko Marin
- Luc Menaše

== Š ==
- Majda Širca

== V ==
- Anton Vodnik

== Z ==
- Igor Zabel
