= Slovenski glasnik =

- Editor: Anton Janežič
- Frequency: Monthly
- First issue: 1858
- Final issue: 1869
- Country: Austria
- Language: Slovene
- ISSN: 2350-5540
- OCLC: 442388661

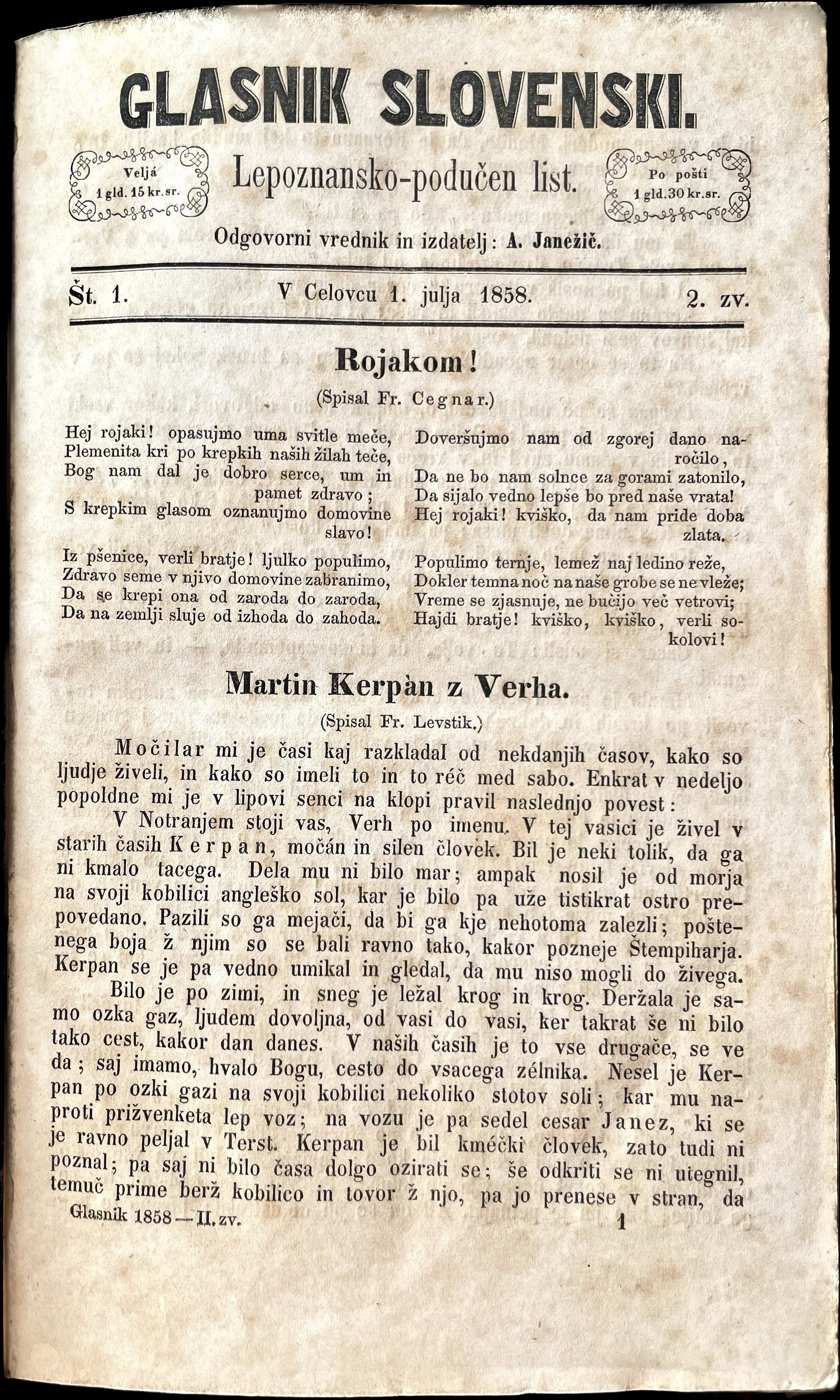
The story about Martin Krpan in the Slovenski glasnik in 1858

Slovenski glasnik (English: The Slovene Herald) was a Slovene-language magazine published monthly from 1858 till 1869.

== History and profile ==
Slovenski glasnik was established by Slovenian Carinthian Anton Janežič. Initially, until July 1856, it was called Glasnik za literaturo in umetnost. The magazine was edited by Janežič and published in Klagenfurt, then in the Duchy of Carinthia (now in Austria). Among the contributors were the most important Slovene writers of the period, namely Simon Jenko, Josip Jurčič, Fran Erjavec, Valentin Mandelc and Fran Levstik.

Slovenski glasnik was the first Slovene language magazine with a chess column. It was edited by Josip Ogrinec and Ivan Kos, and for the first time in history presented chess terminology and chess problems in Slovene.

== See also ==
- List of magazines in Slovenia
