= Slovenian–Italian Cultural-Historical Commission =

The Slovenian-Italian Cultural-Historical Commission (1993—2000) was a joint bilateral commission the members of which were appointed by Republic of Slovenia and Republic of Italy by the exchange of notes in October 1993. It was established with the task of conducting a comprehensive in-depth study of all the relevant aspects of the history of political and cultural relations between the two nations, including the tragic periods. Although the initiative was launched at the governmental level, the bilateral commission was independent in its work.

== Members of the Commission and its sessions ==
Slovenian

Co-chairperson from the Slovenian part of the commission was Milica Kacin Wohinz. Members included France Dolinar, Boris Gombac, Branko Marušic, Boris Mlakar, Nevenka Troha and Andrej Vovko. After Boris Mlakar resigned from the commission, he was replaced by the writer Aleksander Vuga; then, in March 1996, Boris Gombac resigned, and Boris Mlakar was again included in the commission.

Italian

Co-chairperson from the Italian part of the commission was Sergio Bartole. Members included Fulvio Tomizza, Senator Lucio Toth, Fulvio Salimbeni, Elio Apih, Paola Pagnini and Angelo Ara. Owing to various reasons the co-chairman resigned and was replaced by Prof. Giorgio Conetti by the Minister's letter of 10 March 1999, and members of the Commission Fulvio Tomizza and Elio Apih were replaced by Raoul Pupo and Marina Cataruzza.

Sessions

- 1993 November 19 at Venice (Italy)
- 1994 February 4–5 at Otočec (Slovenia)
- 1994 April 12–13 at Passariano (Udine, Italy)
- 1995 March 17–18 at Bled (Slovenia)
- 1995 June 3 in Aquileia (Italy)
- 1996 April 12–13 in Portorož (Slovenia)
- 1999 October 5 in Gorizia (Italy)
- 1999 November 20 in Koper (Slovenia)
- 2000 June 27 in Udine (Italy)

== Report on Slovene-Italian Relations 1880-1956 ==
At its final session on 27 June 2000 in Udine the Commission adopted the final report unanimously.
