= Valentin Zarnik =

Slovenian politician, writer, and lawyer

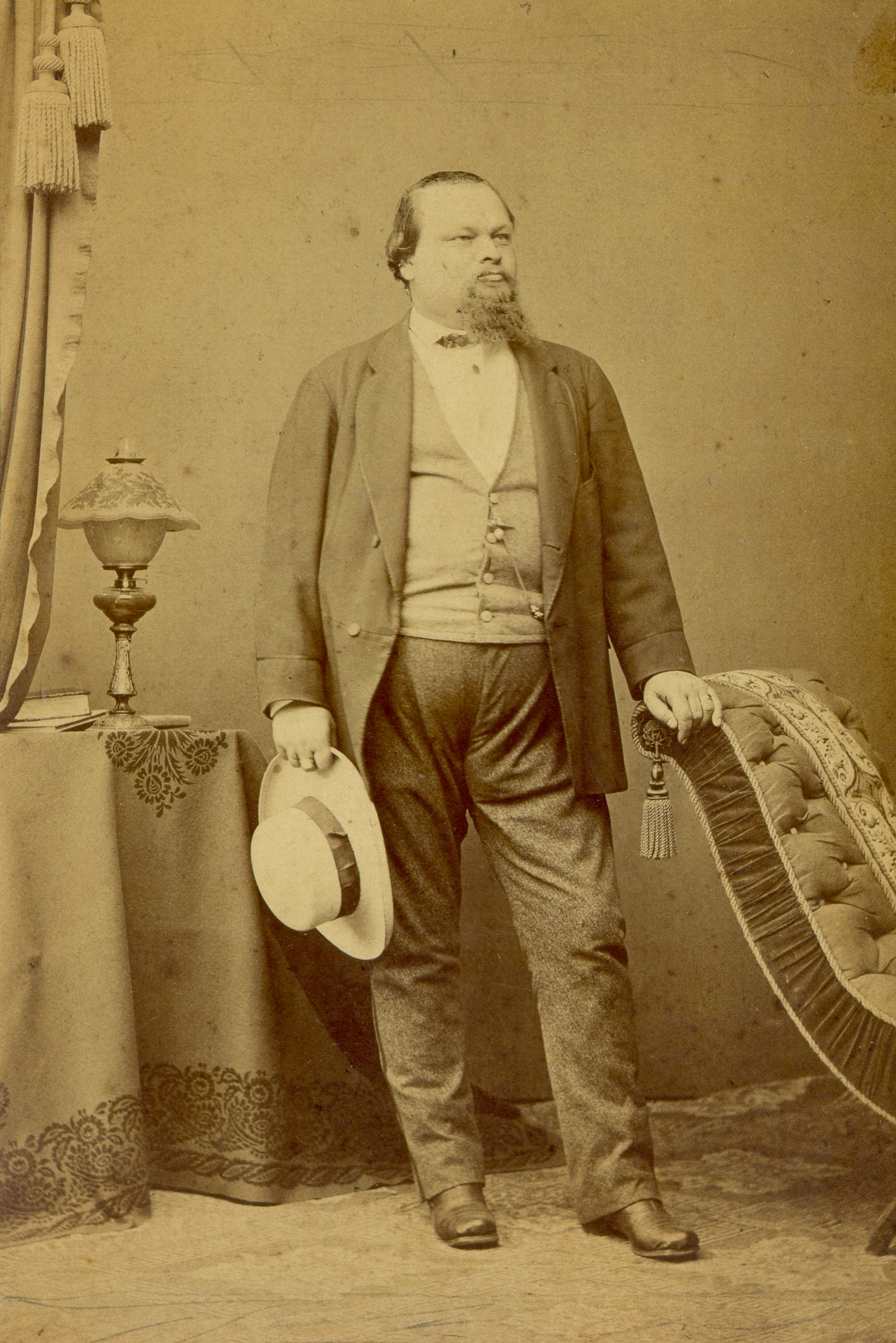
Valentin Zarnik

Valentin Zarnik (14 February 1837 in Repnje – 30 March 1888 in Laibach) was an ethnic Slovenian lawyer, nationalist politician and writer who lived in Austria-Hungary.
