= Matija Ahacel =

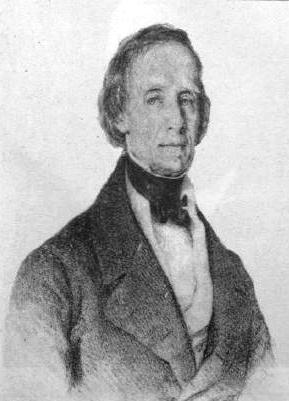
- Image of professor Matija
- Born: 24 February 1779; Gorentschach, Carinthia
- Died: 23 September 1845 (aged 66)
- Citizenship: Carinthia
- Known for: Collection of folk music

Matija Ahacel, also known in German as Matthias Achazel (24 February 1779 – 23 September 1845), born Matija Kobentar, was a Carinthian Slovene philologist, publicist, and collector of folk songs.

Ahacel was born in a peasant family in the village of Gorentschach (Slovene: Gorenče) near the market town of Sankt Jakob im Rosental (Slovene: Št. Jakob v Rožu) in the Duchy of Carinthia. He worked as professor of mathematics in the lyceum in Klagenfurt. He collaborated with Urban Jarnik, Anton Janežič and Anton Martin Slomšek in preserving the folk traditions of Slovenes in Carinthia and in Lower Styria. In 1833 and 1838, he published a collection of folk songs under the title Pesme po Koroškim ino Štajarskem znane (Songs Known in Carinthia and in Styria"). The third volume was published in 1858 by Slomšek.

Ahacel died in Klagenfurt.
