= Majda Širca =

Slovenian art historian, journalist and politician

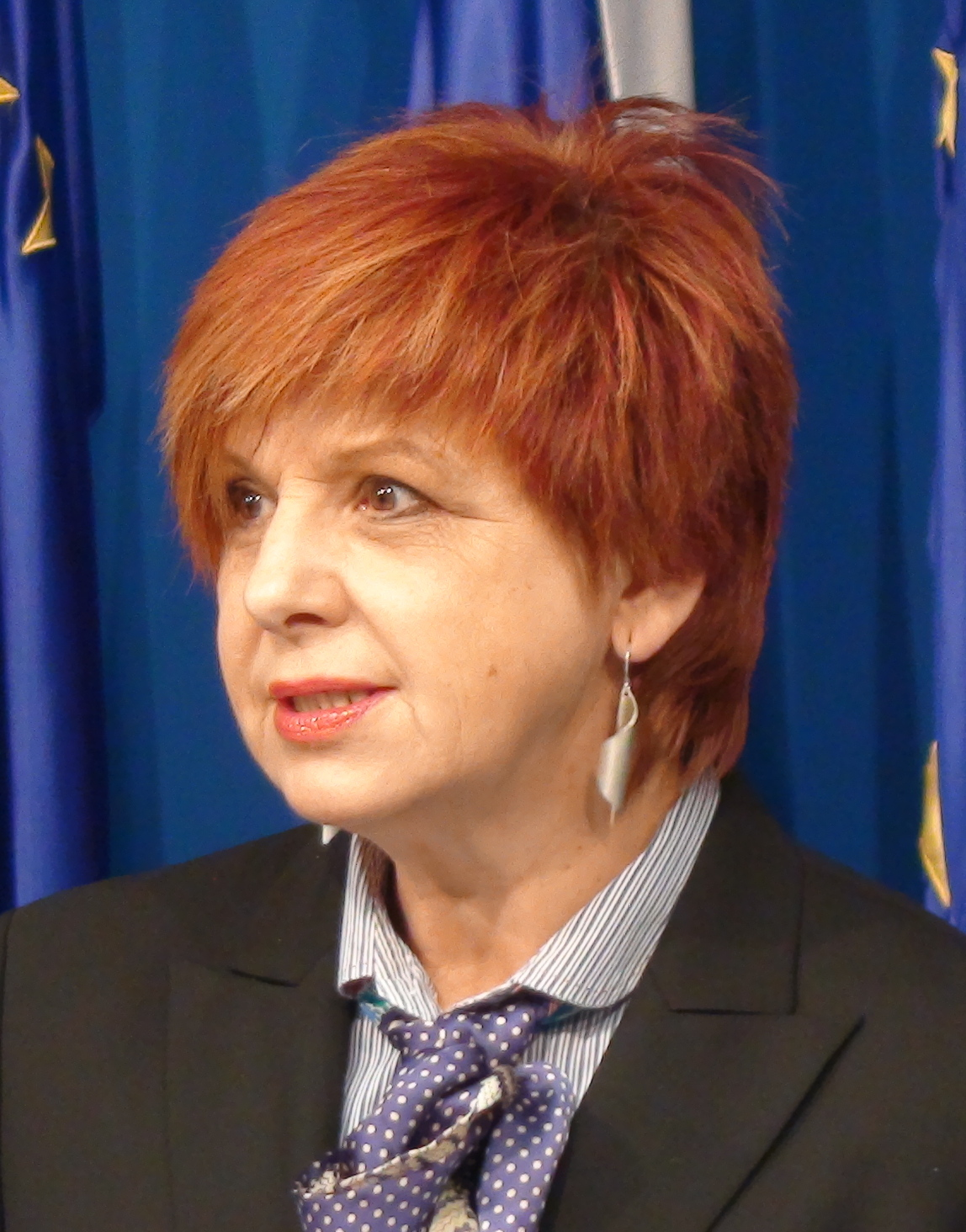
Majda Širca Ravnikar.

Majda Širca Ravnikar (born 20 April 1953) is a Slovenian art historian, journalist and politician. She served as Minister of Culture in the government of Borut Pahor.

She was born in Postojna, then part of the People's Republic of Slovenia of the Federal People's Republic of Yugoslavia. She spent her youth in the Karst region in western Slovenia. She attended elementary school in Štanjel and Dutovlje, and high school in Postojna. She has a degree in art history from the Faculty of Arts of the University of Ljubljana. She worked as a journalist at Slovenian State Television in cultural programming, especially dealing with art film. During this time, she produced more than 60 short documentary films.

In 1997, she was appointed State Secretary at the Ministry of Culture under Jožef Školč. In the 2000 parliamentary elections, she was elected to the Slovenian National Assembly on the list of the Liberal Democracy of Slovenia. She was re-elected in 2004. During the centre-right government of Janez Janša between 2004 and 2008, she emerged as the main opposition speaker in culture and media policy, strongly criticizing conservative Minister of Culture Vasko Simoniti. The two developed a personal animosity, which was well known to the public.

In 2007, she left the Liberal Democracy of Slovenia party and became one of the founding member of the social liberal party Zares. After the victory of the leftist parties in the parliamentary election of 2008, she was appointed Minister of Culture in the government of Borut Pahor.

Majda Širca was married to the late Slovenian architect Vojteh Ravnikar.

Political offices
Preceded by Vasko Simoniti	Minister of Culture of the Republic of Slovenia; November 2008 - present	Succeeded by incumbent
