= Andrej Studen =

Slovenian historian and sociologist (1963–2022)

Andrej Studen (1963–5 November 2022) was a Slovenian historian and sociologist of culture who mostly wrote on the everyday, bourgeoisie, alcoholism, and marginalised communities. He significantly contributed to the understanding of the history of the Romani people in Slovenia and received a broad public acclaim.

He was born in Celje and studied history and sociology of culture in the 1980s in Ljubljana. In 1992 and 1993, he took post-graduate studies with Hans Jürgen Teuteberg at the University of Münster. Since 1988, he was employed as a researcher at the Institute of Contemporary History in Ljubljana, and since the 2000s as a lecturer at the University of Primorska (Faculty of Humanities) and University of Ljubljana (Faculty of Arts). He earned his Ph.D. in 1996 with a dissertation on the housing culture of Ljubljana in the 19th century.

In 2010, Studen was awarded the KLIO award, which is the highest Slovenian award in the field of historiography, by the Association of Slovenian Historical Societies for the book Pijane zverine. O moralni in patološki zgodovini alkoholizma na Slovenskem v dobi meščanstva (Drunken Beasts. On the Moral and Pathological History of Alcoholism in Slovenia; 2009) as the best historiographical work in the past year. Another Studen's major work was Neprilagojeni in nevarni: podoba in status Ciganov v preteklosti (Unadapted and Dangerous: the Image and Status of Gypsies in the Past; 2015) on the history of the Romani people. He also wrote a high-school textbook in collaboration with Janez Cvirn and arranged an exhibition of torture devices at the Celje Castle.
