= Milica Kacin Wohinz =

Slovenian historian (1930–2021)

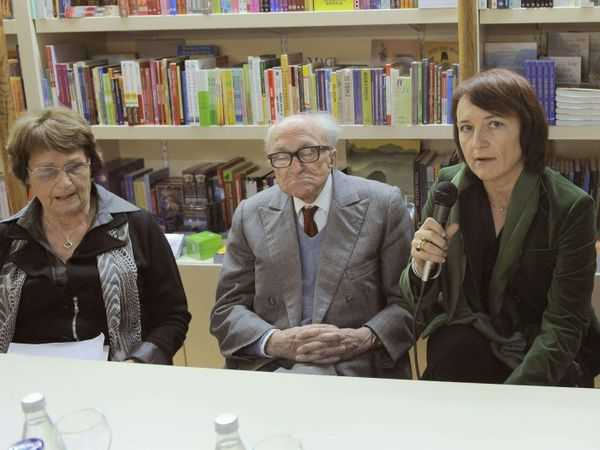
- Milica Kacin Wohinz (left) in Trieste with Boris Pahor and historian Marta Verginella.
- Born: 12 October 1930; Cerkno, [Kingdom of Italy], now Slovenia
- Died: 28 December 2021 (aged 91)
- Education: University of Ljubljana
- Scientific career
- Fields: modern history

Milica Kacin Wohinz (née Brezigar; 12 October 1930 – 28 December 2021) was a Slovenian historian best known for her seminal study on the history of the forceful Italianization of the Slovene minority in Italy (1920–1947) that took place between 1918 and 1943.

== Life ==
Wohinz was born in the Slovene Littoral, which was annexed by the Kingdom of Italy after World War I. At the age of twelve, she was expelled from school by the Italian Fascist regime as punishment for her father's resistance to Italianization. During World War II, she joined the Liberation Front of the Slovenian People, helping Slovene partisans. After World War II and the annexation of the Slovenian Littoral to Yugoslavia in 1947, she attended the Slovene-language high schools in Postojna and Ljubljana.

In 1952, she enrolled at the University of Ljubljana, where she studied history. She obtained her PhD in 1970 under the supervision of Vasilij Melik. From 1959 onward, she worked at the Institute of Contemporary History in Ljubljana. Between 1979 and 1983, she was head of the institute.

Marxist pressures against her work

Because her research topic was the history of an ethnic minority and not the history of the working class, her work was subjected to Marxist criticisms by Dušan Kermavner during Slovenia's socialist period.

== Work ==
Her works on Slovene and Croat anti-Fascist resistance against Italianization are considered pioneering. She was one of the first historians to engage in thorough research of the militant anti-Fascist organization TIGR.

She was member of the joint Slovenian–Italian Cultural-Historical Commission, established by the governments of the Republic of Slovenia and Republic of Italy to jointly publish the account of the historical relationship between the two peoples from 1880 to 1954 based on historiographic examination of sources.

=== Selected publications ===
In Slovene

- 1974 Slovenci v zamejstvu: pregled zgodovine 1918–1945 (Slovenes beyond the Borders: A Historical Overview), co-authored with Tone Ferenc. Ljubljana: Državna založba Slovenije.
- 1977 Narodnoobrambno gibanje primorskih Slovencev, 1921–1928 (The Ethnic Identity Movement of the Slovenes in the Littoral Region between 1921 and 1928). Koper: Lipa.
- 1990 Prvi antifašizem v Evropi. Primorska 1925–1935 (The First Anti-Fascism in Europe. The Slovenian Littoral between 1925 and 1935). Koper: Lipa.
- 2000 Zgodovina Slovencev v Italiji 1866–2000 (The History of Slovenes in Italy 1866–2000). Ljubljana: Nova revija. ISBN 9616352113
- 2008 Primorski upor fašizmu: 1920–1941 (The Slovene Resistance against Fascism, 1920–1941), co-authored with Marta Verginella. Ljubljana: Slovenska matica.

In Italian

- 1998 Storia degli sloveni in Italia: 1866–1998 (History of the Slovenes in Italy, 1866–1998), co-authored with Jože Pirjevec. Venice: Marsilio.
- 2004 Vivere al confine: sloveni e italiani negli anni 1918–1941 (Living on the Border: Slovenes and Italians between the Years 1918 and 1941). Gorizia: Goriška Mohorjeva družba.
