= Roberto Juarroz =

Argentine poet (1925–1995)

Roberto Juarroz (5 October 1925 – 31 March 1995) was an Argentine poet famous for his "Poesía vertical" (Vertical poetry).

== Biography ==
Born in Coronel Dorrego, Roberto Juarroz published 14 volumes of poetry in all, numbered successively 1 to 14, under the general title "Poesía vertical", the first appearing in 1958 and the final one posthumously in 1997. A fifteenth volume was edited by his wife, the poet and critic Laura Cerrato, and published after his death. W.S. Merwin published a bilingual selection of Juarroz' poems in 1977 (Kayak Books) which was re-issued in an enlarged edition in 1987 (North Point Press), both volumes entitled Vertical Poetry. In 1992 Mary Crow published her translations of the later work as Vertical Poetry: Recent Poems (White Pine Press), which won a Colorado Book Award. In 2011 Crow's translations of a selection of Juarroz' final poems appeared as Vertical Poetry: Last Poems (White Pine Press). Juarroz died in 1995 in Temperley.

== Literary style and critical reception ==
The poetry of Juarroz is spare and sometimes cryptic, with lines such as "busco las espaldas de Dios" ("I seek the back of God"). Octavio Paz wrote: "Each poem of Roberto Juarroz is a surprising verbal crystallisation: language reduced to a bead of light. A major poet of absolute moments." For Julio Cortázar, his poems included both "the most elevated, and most profound, written in Spanish in recent years". Andreas Dorschel calls the "philosophical poetry" of Roberto Juarroz "transparent and dark at the same time", and praises "its lightness and its metaphysical wit".

== Example ==
El silencio que queda entre dos palabras
no es el mismo silencio que envuelve una cabeza cuando cae,
ni tampoco el que estampa la presencia del árbol
cuando se apaga el incendio vespertino del viento.

— From: El silencio que queda entre dos palabras
Translation:

The silence that lingers between two words
is not the same silence that envelops a head that falls,
nor that which marks the presence of a tree
at the stilling of the wind's evening fire.

== English translations ==
- Juarroz, Roberto. Vertical Poetry, trans. by W.S. Merwin. Kayak Books, 1977. ISBN 978-0-685-67046-0.
  Enlarged edition, North Point Books, 1988 ISBN 978-0-86547-307-2.
- Juarroz, Roberto. Vertical Poetry: Recent Poems, trans. by Mary Crow. White Pine Press, 1992. ISBN 978-1-877727-08-5.
- Juarroz, Roberto. Vertical Poetry: Last Poems, trans. by Mary Crow. White Pine Press, 2011.

Translations of individual poems have appeared in many anthologies, including "The Vintage Book of World Poetry" and "The Poetry of Our World: An International Anthology of Contemporary Poetry," and literary magazines, including Salamander, Literal: Latin American Voices, Seneca Review, Hawai'i Review, and Visions International.
