= Bizeljsko =

Bizeljsko Wisell
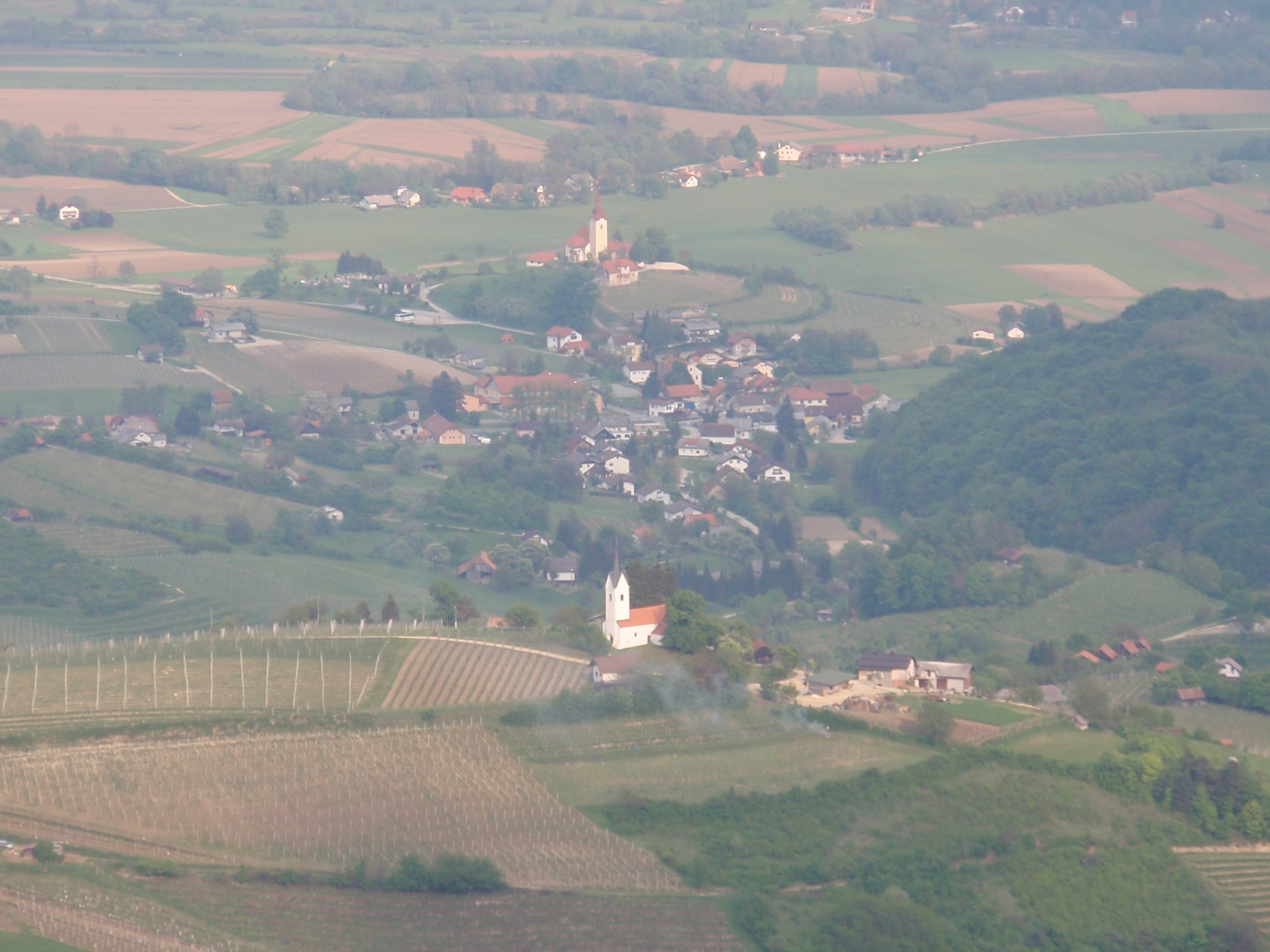

- Location in Slovenia
- Coordinates: 46°0′56.9″N 15°41′24.98″E
- Country: Slovenia
- Traditional region: Styria
- Statistical region: Lower Sava
- Municipality: Brežice

Area
  - Total: 10.27 km^{2} (3.97 sq mi)
- Elevation: 177.9 m (584 ft)

Population (2020)
  - Total: 662
  - Density: 64.5/km^{2} (167/sq mi)

Bizeljsko (pronounced [biˈzeːlskɔ]; German: Wisell) is a settlement in the Municipality of Brežice in eastern Slovenia, close to the border with Croatia. It lies on the right bank of the Sotla River and in terms of its territory is the largest settlement in the Municipality of Brežice. The area is part of the traditional region of Styria. It is now included in the Lower Sava Statistical Region. It includes the hamlets of Bošt, Nimnik, Gradišče (German: Gradischberg), Župjek, Spodnja Sušica (German: Untersuschitz), Zgornja Sušica (German: Obersuschitz), Janežičeva Gorca (German: Johannesberg), Vrhovnica, and Vitna Vas (Slovene: Vitna vas).

== Church ==
The parish church in the settlement is dedicated to Saint Lawrence and belongs to the Roman Catholic Diocese of Celje. It is a Baroque building, erected between 1725 and 1737 on the site of an older structure of which only part of the belfry remains. Anton Martin Slomšek was a curate in Bizeljsko between 1825 and 1827. A second church northwest of the settlement is dedicated to Saint Vitus and is a 17th-century building that was vaulted in the 18th century.
