= List of Slovenian geographers and geologists =

A list of notable geographers and geologists from Slovenia:

== Geographers ==
- Boštjan Burger
- Peter Kosler (1824–1879)
- Anton Melik (1890–1966)
- Rajko Pavlovec (born 1932)
- Franci Petek (born 1971)
- Jože Velikonja (born 1923)

== Geologists ==
- Albert Heim
- Anton Ramovš
