= Hans Jürgen Teuteberg =

German historian (1929–2015)

Hans Jürgen Teuteberg (18 December 1929–14 February 2015) was a German historian, who worked as a professor of social and economic history at the University of Münster from 1974 to 1995.

Teuteberg's magnum opus was his History of Industrial Codetermination in Germany (1961) or Geschichte der Industriellen Mitbestimmung in Deutschland. This exhaustively examined the legal origins of codetermination laws, which are found in a majority of EU countries today, that give workers a right to participate in the management of their companies or organisations. Teuteberg traces the roots of codetermination back to Carl Degenkolb's proposals at the Frankfurt Parliament during the 1848 Revolutions.

== Publications ==
Articles

- 'Zur Entstehungsgeschichte der ersten betrieblichen Arbeitervertretungen in Deutschland ' (1960) 11(1-2) Soziale Welt 69-82

Books

- Geschichte der Industriellen Mitbestimmung in Deutschland (1961)
