= Janez J. Švajncer =

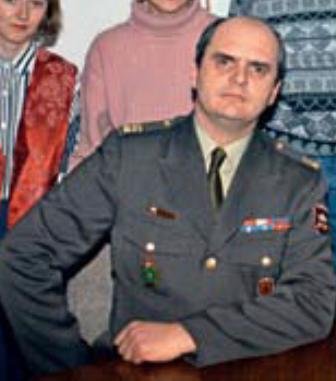
Janez Janez Švajncer

Janez Janez Švajncer (shortened Janez J. Švajncer) (born 3 July 1948) is a Slovenian retired brigadier, historian, lawyer, museologist, writer, editor and a veteran of the Ten-Day War. He is an author of several volumes and articles on military history, and is one of the most renowned Slovenian militar historians.

Švajncer was born in Ljubljana, Federal People's Republic of Yugoslavia, now Slovenia. In 1967 he graduated from a grammar school in Maribor. Three years later he took a degree in a law school and after that he enrolled the Faculty of law in Ljubljana.

Between December 1990 and June 1991, he helped in the reorganization of the Slovenian Territorial Defence into a proper Slovenian Army. He participated in the Ten Day War against the invasion of the Yugoslav People's Army. Between 1991 and 1992, he was head of the Department for Patriotic Education of the Headquarters of the Slovenian Army; between 1992 and 1994, he served as vice-secretary of the Ministry of Defence and director of the Office for Military Affairs within the Ministry. After the dismissal of Defence Minister Janez Janša in 1994, Janez Švajncer was dismissed from office and retired in 1996.

In 2020, in an interview with the magazine Reporter, he expressed an initiative to transform Slovenia from a republic into a monarchy. As suitable candidates for the throne, he proposed the descendants of the Habsburgs, Karađorđevićs and Bonapartes, families that in the past had a ruling position on Slovenian territory.

Švajncer is author of numerous volumes of military history, both Slovenian and widely European. He is also author of several novels and children books.
