= Oto Luthar =

Slovenian historian (born 1959)

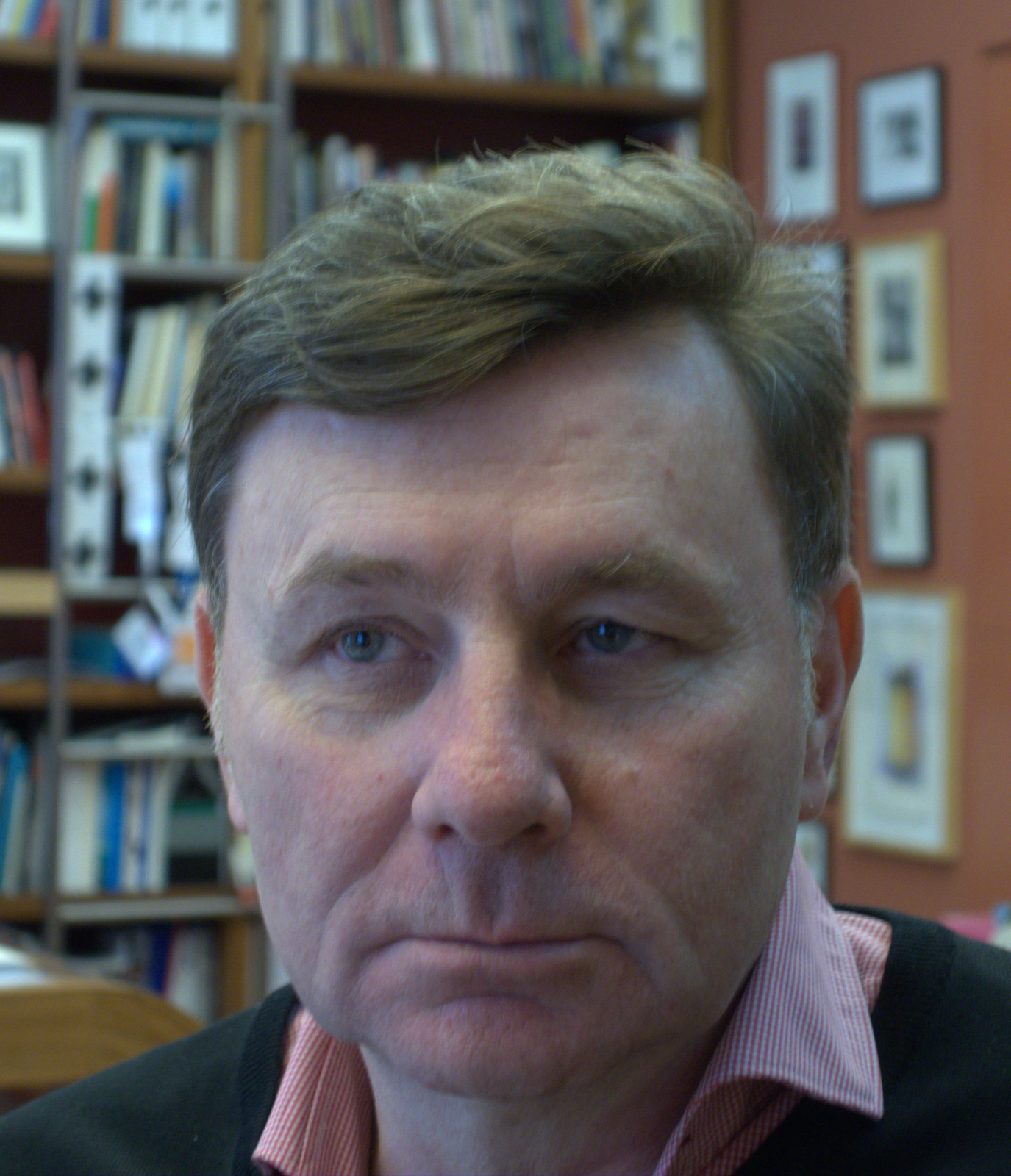

Oto Luthar (born 11 August 1959) is a Slovenian historian. Since 1992, he has served as the director of the Research Centre of the Slovenian Academy of Sciences and Arts in Ljubljana, the second largest research institution in Slovenia.

He was born in Murska Sobota, Slovenia, then part of the Socialist Federal Republic of Yugoslavia. He studied history at the University of Ljubljana, graduating under the supervision of Peter Vodopivec and Bogo Grafenauer in 1986. He obtained his PhD in 1992. Since 1989, he has taught history at the University of Maribor, University of Nova Gorica and University of Ljubljana. He was a visiting professor and researcher at Yale University (1999-2000), Vienna University (2008), Columbia University (2013) and Ohio State University (2016).

He has written on numerous subjects, including the history and theory of historiography, politics of memory, the history of European Jews, especially their relation to Slavic peoples, and the social and cultural history of World War I. He is a coordinator of the Module of Culture History at ZRC SAZU Graduate School. In 2011, Luthar was awarded the Austrian Cross of Honour for Science and Art.

He is married to the cultural critic and sociologist Breda Luthar.

== Selected bibliography ==
- The sanitation of Slovenian post-socialist memorial landscape. V: LUTHAR, Oto (ed.), UHL, Heidemarie (ed.). The memory of guilt revisited: the Slovenian post-socialist remembrance landscape in transition, Zeitgeschichte, 2019, 46(2): 261–273, 297, doi: 10.14220/zsch.2019.46.2.261.
- Post-communist memory culture and the historiography of the Second World War and the post-war execution of Slovenian collaborationists. Politička misao, 2018, 55(2): 33–49, doi: 10.20901/pm.55.2.02.
- Memory, revision, resistance: reviving the partisan monuments along the Slovenian-Italian border. V: KLABJAN, Borut (ur.). Borderlands of memory: Adriatic and Central European perspectives, Oxford: P. Lang. 2019, 235–251.
- Im Schatten des Schweigens: Österreich-Slowenien : eine Nachbarschaft im Wandel. V: CABADA, Ladislav (ed.), WALSCH, Christopher (ed.). Imaginäre Räume in Zentraleuropa: kulturelle Transformationen, politische Repräsentationen und trans/nationale Identitätsentwürfe, Herne: Gabriele Schäfer, 2019, 29–52.
- Ed. Of red dragons and evil spirits : post-communist historiography between democratization and new politics of history. Budapest; New York: Central European University Press, 2017.
- Ed. The Great War and memory in Central and South-Eastern Europe. Leiden; Boston: Brill, 2016, doi: 10.1163/9789004316232_002.
- Ed. et al. A terra e o seu entorno : uma história da Eslovênia, (Coleção Relações internacionais, 714). Brasília: Fundação Alexandre de Gusmão. 2015.
- Ed. The Great War and memory in Central and South-Eastern Europe, (Balkan studies library, vol. 17). Leiden; Boston: Brill, cop. 2016.
- Coeditor, with ŠUMI, Irena. The Slovenian righteous among nations. 1st ed. Ljubljana: Založba ZRC, ZRC SAZU, 2016.
- Coeditor, with ŠUMI, Irena. Slovenski pravični med narodi. 1. izd. Ljubljana: Založba ZRC, 2016.
- (soavtor) Marjeta Šašel Kos, Nada Grošelj, Gregor Pobežin, Zgodovina historične misli [druga izdaja]. Od Homerja do začetka 21. Stoletja 2. Izd. Ljubljana: Založba ZRC, 2016.
- Ed. The Land Between: A History of Slovenia Frankfurt/M: Peter Lang Verlag, 2013.
