= Urban Jarnik =

Slovenian writer

Urban Jarnik (11 May 1784 – 11 June 1844) was a Carinthian Slovene priest, historian, poet, linguist, author and ethnographer.

He was born in the lower Gail Valley in the Duchy of Carinthia. He served as a parish priest in several villages and towns throughout southern Carinthia, including Klagenfurt and Moosburg, which at the time still had a large Slovene-speaking population. Living among the Slovenian-speaking populations, Jarnik developed an interest in the many Slovenian dialects spoken in the era. He became the first Slovenian dialectologist and ethnographer.

He was co-editor of the bilingual scholarly and cultural journal Carinthia, edited in Klagenfurt. In his numerous articles, he wrote about the customs and rural cultural traditions of the local Slovenes. He also collected and edited several books of Slovenian and Slavic folk songs and tales. He strongly influenced later generations of Slovenian ethnologists, folklore collectors, and philologists who lived or worked in Carinthia, such as Anton Janežič, Matija Majar, Matija Ahacel, and Anton Martin Slomšek.

He died in Moosburg.

== See also ==
- Jernej Kopitar
