= Jože Pirjevec =

Slovene–Italian historian (born 1940)

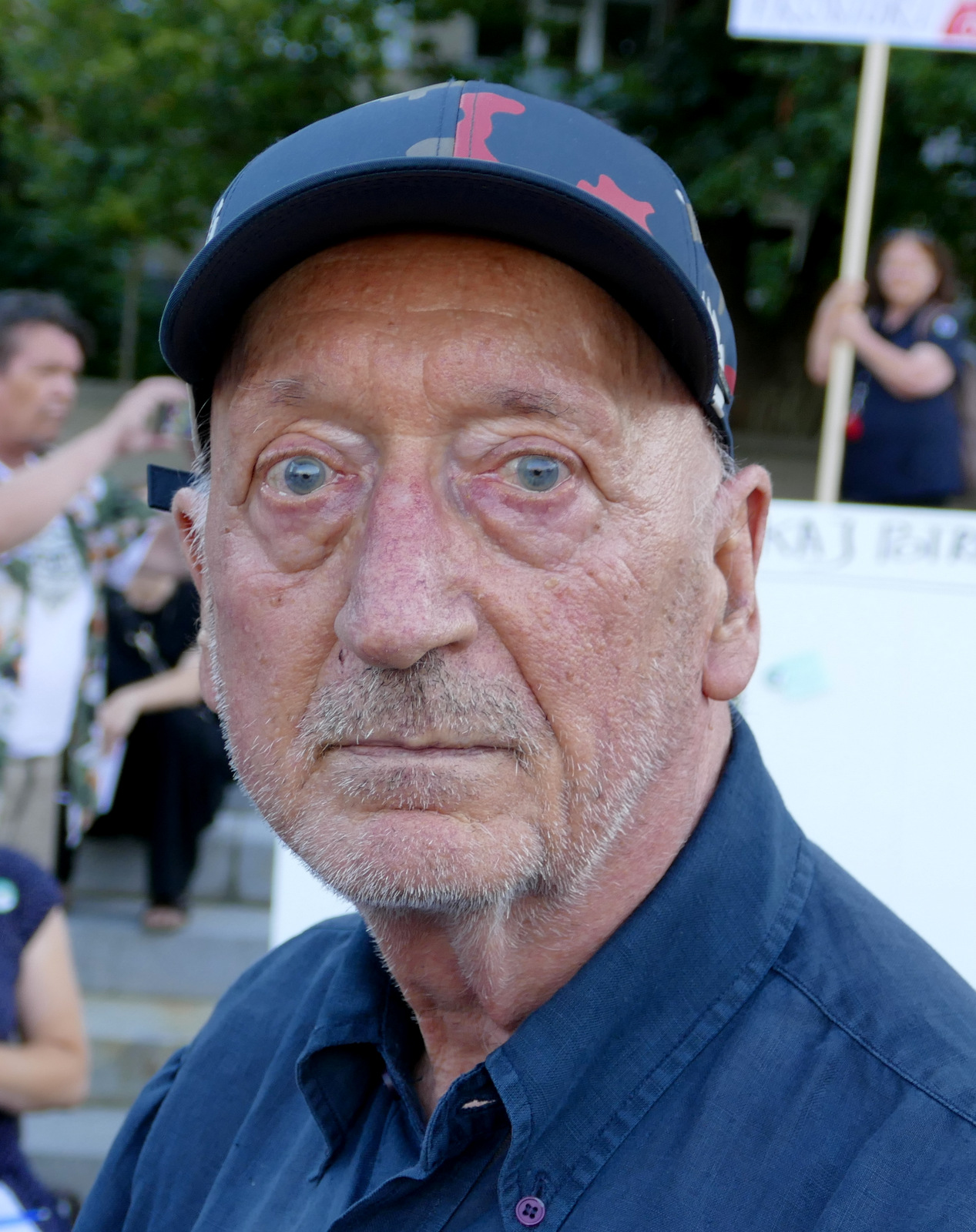
Pirjevec in 2021

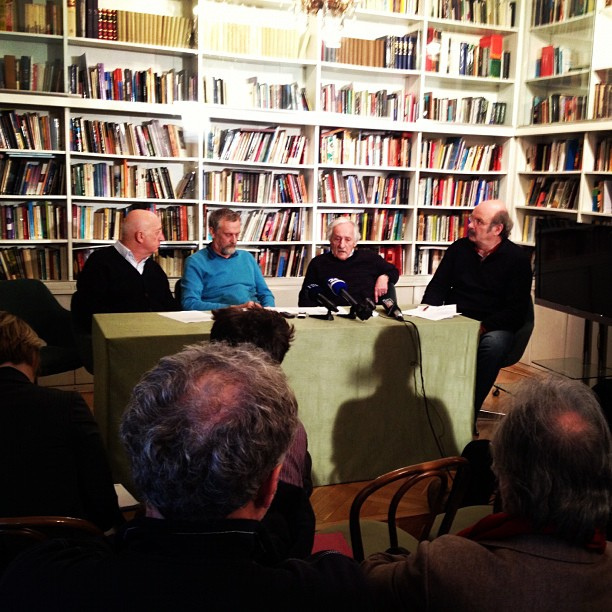
Pirjevec (first from the left) at a press conference in 2013

Jože Pirjevec (born 1 June 1940), registered at birth Giuseppe Pierazzi because of the Italianization policy under the Fascist regime, is a Slovene–Italian historian and a prominent diplomatic historian of the west Balkans region, as well as a member of the Slovenian Academy of Sciences and Arts.

== Biography ==
He was born in a Slovene-speaking family in Sežana, Slovenia, then part of the fascist Kingdom of Italy. His younger sister, Marija, became a translator and literary scholar. After World War II, the family moved from Yugoslavia to the Free Territory of Trieste. In 1966, he received a degree in history from the University of Trieste and in 1971 graduated from the University of Pisa. He continued his studies at the Diplomatic Academy in Vienna. In 1977, he obtained his PhD in Ljubljana under the supervision of historian Fran Zwitter. In 1983 he became an associate professor at the University of Trieste, and in 1986 a full professor of Eastern European history at the Faculty of Political Science in Padua.

He initially researched the relations between Italy and the South Slavic peoples during the Risorgimento in the mid-19th century. He continued with research on Russian history in the second half of the 19th century. Since the 1980s, he has been researching and publishing on the history of Yugoslavia, the Yugoslav wars and the history of the Slovenes in Italy.

In 1988 he received the Kidrič Fund Award for his book Tito, Stalin and the West, and in 2002 he received the Premio Acqui Award for his monograph on the 1991-1999 Yugoslav Wars.

He is currently head of the history department at the University of Primorska in Koper. In 2009, he was elected a full member of the Slovenian Academy of Sciences and Arts.

He has also been active in public life, including party politics. In the 1990s, he was an active member of the Slovene Union, the centrist party of the Slovene minority in the Italian region of Friuli-Venezia Giulia. Since 2005, he has been an active member of the Liberal Democracy of Slovenia. In 2008, he unsuccessfully ran for the Slovenian Parliament in the district of Sežana. Pirjevec is both an Italian and Slovenian citizen. Besides Slovene and Italian, he is fluent in German, English, Serbo-Croatian, Russian and French languages. He is a member of the Honorary Board of the European Association of History Educators.

== Major works ==
In Italian

- Niccolò Tommaseo tra Italia e Slavia ("Niccolò Tommaseo between Italy and the Slavic World"). Venice: Marsilio, 1977.
- Storia della Russia del XIX secolo (1800-1917) ("History of Russia in the 19th Century (1800-1917)"). Padua: Francesco Vallardi, 1984.
- Tito, Stalin e l'Occidente ("Tito, Stalin and the West"). Trieste: Editoriale Stampa Triestina, 1985.
- Trieste, città di frontiera ("Trieste, a City on the Border). Trieste: Lint, 1989.
- Il Giorno di san Vito. Jugoslavia 1918-1992: storia di una tragedia ("St. Vitus Day. Yugoslavia 1918-1992: History of a Tragedy). Turin: Nuova Eri, 1993.
- Serbi, Croati, Sloveni : storia di tre nazioni ("Serbs, Croats, Slovenes: History of Three Nations"). Bologna: Il Mulino, 1995.
- L'altra resistenza: la guerra di liberazione a Trieste e nella Venezia Giulia ("The Other Resistance: the Liberation Fight in Trieste and the Julian March"), co-authored with Marta Verginella and Roberto Spazzali. Trieste: Qualestoria, 1995.
- Storia degli sloveni in Italia, 1866-1998 ("History of the Slovenes in Italy, 1866-1998). Co-authored with Milica Kacin Wohinz. Venice: Marsilio, 1998.
- Le guerre jugoslave, 1991-1999 ("The Yugoslav Wars"). Turin: Giulio Einaudi Editore, 2001.
- Foibe : una storia d'Italia ("Foibe: An Italian History). Turin: Giulio Einaudi Editore, 2009.

In Slovene

- Tržaški vozel. 1945-1980 ("The Trieste Knot. 1945-1980"). Trieste: Založništvo tržaškega tiska, 1985.
- Vojna in mir na Primorskem ("War and Peace in the Slovenian Littoral"), editor. Koper: University of Primorska, 2005.
- "Trst je naš!" Boj Slovencev za morje (1848-1954) ("'Trieste Is Ours!' The Slovene Struggle for the Access to the Sea (1848-1954)"). Ljubljana: Nova revija, 2007.
- Tito in tovariši ("Tito and the Comrades"). Ljubljana: Cankarjeva založba, 2011.
