= Marta Verginella =

Slovenian academic

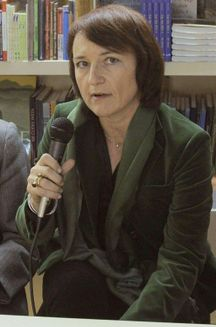
- Marta Verginella in 2008
- Born: 20 June 1960 (age 66); Trieste, Italy
- Scientific career
- Fields: modern history

Marta Verginella (born 20 June 1960) is a Slovenian historian from the Slovene minority in Italy in Trieste, notable as one of the most prominent contemporary Slovene historians. Together with Alenka Puhar, she is considered a pioneer in the history of family relations in the Slovene Lands.

Verginella is Full Professor of General History of the 19th Century and Theory of History at the Department of History of the Faculty of Arts, University of Ljubljana.

== Life ==
She was born in Trieste, Italy. She attended Slovene language schools in Trieste. In 1984, she graduated from history at the University of Trieste under the supervision of the renowned social anthropologist and feminist historian Luisa Accati. For five years she worked as a high school teacher in the schools with Slovene as language of instruction, both in Trieste and Gorizia. In 1995, she obtained her PhD at the University of Ljubljana under the supervision of Peter Vodopivec, with a thesis on the changing attitudes towards death in the 19th century rural peripheries of Trieste.

== Work ==
She has been visiting professor at several universities in Italy, as well as at the University of Valencia in Spain, and the University of Primorska in Koper, Slovenia. Since 1996, she has taught theory of historiography and social history of 19th century Europe at the University of Ljubljana.

She has written on a variety of topics, including social and demographic history, history of historiography, cultural history of 19th and 20th century, women studies, national studies, border studies and the history of the Slovene minority in Italy (1920-1947). She rose to prominence with her studies on the relationship between the urban and rural societies in Habsburg Istria.

Particularly outstanding are also her microhistory studies on the daily life during World War II. In the last decade, she has also written extensively on history of intellectuals in the border area between Slovenia and Italy. Her essay about the issue, entitled The Border of the Others ("Il confine degli altri") became a best-seller in Italy in 2008.

== Selected works ==
=== In Italian ===
- 1990 Città e campagna nel tramonto asburgico ("City and Countryside in the Late Habsburg Empire"). Turin.
- 1995 L'altra resistenza: la guerra di liberazione a Trieste e nella Venezia Giulia ("The Other Resistance: the Liberation Fight in Trieste and the Julian March"), co-authored with Jože Pirjevec and Roberto Spazzali. Trieste.
- 1999 Fra invenzione della tradizione e ri-scrittura del passato: las storiografia slovena degli anni Novanta ("Between Invention of Tradition and the Re-Writing of the Past: Slovenian Historiography in the 1990s"), editor. Trieste.
- 2001 Sloveni a Trieste tra Sette e Ottocento: da comunità etnica a minoranza nazionale ("The Slovenes in Trieste between the 18th and 19th Century: from Ethnic Community to National Minority"). Trieste.
- 2008 Il confine degli altri: la questione giuliana e la memoria slovena ("The Border of the Others. The Julian March Question and the Slovene Remembrance"). Rome.
- 2015 La guerra di Bruno : l' identità di confine di un antieroe triestino e sloveno (Saggi, Storia e scienze sociali). Roma: Donzelli.
- 2016 Terre e lasciti : pratiche testamentarie nel contado triestino fra Otto e Novecento (Beit storia). Trieste: Beit.

=== In Slovene ===
- 1990 Družina v Dolini pri Trstu v 19. stoletju ("Family Life in the Village of Dolina near Trieste in the 19th Century"). Ljubljana.
- 1996 Ekonomija odrešenja in preživetja : odnos do življenja in smrti na tržaškem podeželju ("The Economy of Redemption and Survival: the Attitude towards Life and Death in the Trieste Countryside"). Koper.
- 2004 Suha pašta, pesek in bombe: vojni dnevnik Bruna Trampuža ("Dried Pasta, Sand and Bombs: War Journal of Bruno Trampuž"). Koper.
- 2006 Ženska obrobja: vpis žensk v zgodovino Slovencev ("Women's Peripheries: the Inscription of Women in the Slovene History"). Ljubljana.
- 2008 Primorski upor fašizmu: 1920–1941 ("The Anti-Fascist Resistance in the Slovenian Littoral, 1920–1941"), co-authored with *+*Milica Kacin Wohinz. Ljubljana.
- 2009 Meja drugih: primorsko vprašanje in slovenski spomin. Ljubljana: Modrijan, 2009.

=== In English ===
- 2006 Pajk, Pavlina (born Doljak) (1854–1901). IN: HAAN, Francisca de (ed.), DASKALOVA, Krasimira (ed.), LOUTFI, Anna (ed.). A biographical dictionary of women's movements and feminisms in Central, Eastern, and South Eastern Europe : 19th and 20th centuries. Budapest; New York: CEU Press/Central European University Press, pp. 389–391.
- 2006 Štebi, Alojzija (Lojzka) (1883–1956). IN: HAAN, Francisca de (ed.), DASKALOVA, Krasimira (ed.), LOUTFI, Anna (ed.). A biographical dictionary of women's movements and feminisms in Central, Eastern, and South Eastern Europe : 19th and 20th centuries. Budapest; New York: CEU Press/Central European University Press, pp. 530–533.
- 2010 Border genealogies: Slovenian claims to Trieste. IN: ARTICO, Davide (ed.), MANTELLI, Brunello (ed.). From Versailles to Munich : twenty years of forgotten wars. Wrocław: Dolnośląskie Wydawnictwo Edukacyjne, pp. 73–96.
- 2012 Between rejection and affinity : Slovene-German relations on the periphery of the Habsburg monarchy. IN: BRUNNER, José (ed.), NACHUM, Iris (ed.)."Die Deutschen" als die Anderen : Deutschland in der Imagination seiner Nachbarn, (Tel Aviver Jahrbuch für deutsche Geschichte, 40 (2012). Göttingen: Wallstein, pp. 44–59.
- 2013 SELIŠNIK, Irena, VERGINELLA, Marta: The desire to be free: Marica Nadlišek Bartol and the young intelligentsia at the turn of the 20th century. Historijski zbornik, 2013, 66 (1), pp. 101–120.
- 2015 Displacement and cultural borders in the Great war: bitterness of the refugee experience in the native country or abroad. Acta Histriae, 23 (3), pp. 357–376.
- 2015 Writing historiography on migrations at the meeting point of nations in the Northern Adriatic. IN: HROBAT VIRLOGET, Katja (ed.), GOUSSEFF, Catherine (ed.), CORNI, Gustavo (ed.). At home but foreigners : population transfers in 20th century Istria. Koper: University of Primorska, Science and Research Centre, Annales University Press, pp. 49–70.
- 2016 Succession choices of small farmers and women farmers' wills in the area around Trieste in the nineteenth century. IN: SOVIČ, Silvia (ed.), VIAZZO, Pier Paolo (ed.), THANE, Pat (ed.). The history of families and households : comparative European dimensions, (Central and Eastern Europe, 6). Leiden; Boston: Brill, pp. 207–231.

== See also ==
- Boris M. Gombač

== Sources ==
- Short biography with photo
- Biography
