= Anton Martin Slomšek =

Slovene bishop and poet

His Excellency Blessed Anton Martin Slomšek
- Bishop of Lavant
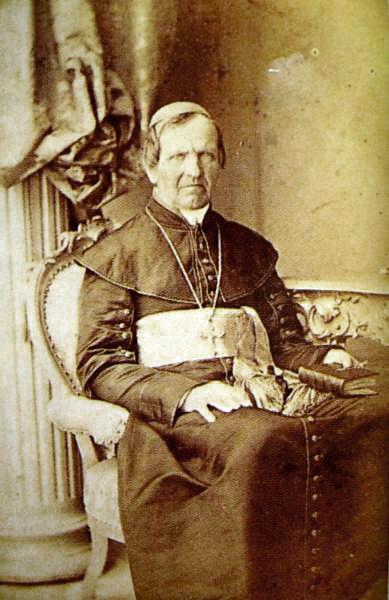
- Photograph taken in Vienna in 1862.
- Church: Roman Catholic Church
- Diocese: Lavant
- See: Lavant
- Appointed: 30 May 1846
- Installed: 4 September 1859
- Term ended: 24 September 1862
- Predecessor: Franz Xaver Kuttnar
- Successor: Jakob Ignaz Maximilian Stepišnik

Orders
- Ordination: 8 September 1824
- Consecration: 5 July 1846 by Friedrich Joseph Cölestin zu von Schwarzenburg
- Rank: Bishop

Personal details
- Born: Anton Martin Slomšek; 26 November 1800 Uniše, Styria, Habsburg monarchy (modern Slovenia)
- Died: 24 September 1862 (aged 61) Maribor, Styria, Austrian Empire (modern Slovenia)
- Motto: Ad maiorem Dei gloriam animarumque salutem ("For the greater glory of God and the salvation of souls")
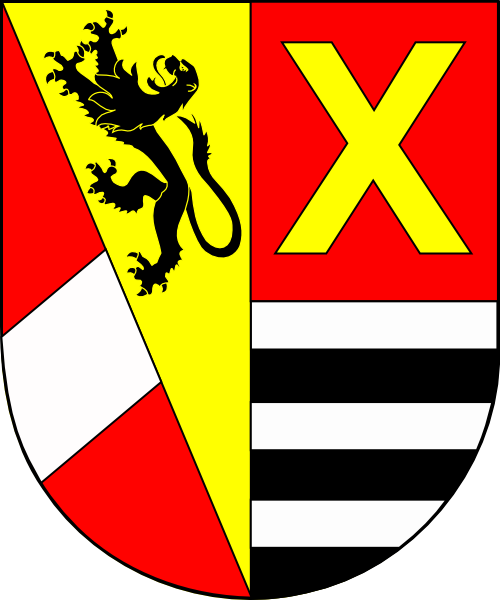
- Coat of arms

Sainthood
- Feast day: 24 September
- Venerated in: Roman Catholic Church
- Beatified: 19 September 1999; Maribor, Slovenia by Pope John Paul II
- Attributes: Episcopal attire
- Patronage: Students; Educators; Writers; Poets; Wine makers; Diocese of Lavant

Blessed Anton Martin Slomšek (26 November 1800 – 24 September 1862) was a Slovene Roman Catholic prelate who served as the Bishop of Lavant from 1846 until his death. He served also as an author and poet as well as a staunch advocate of the nation's culture. He served in various parishes as a simple priest prior to his becoming a bishop in which his patriotic activism increased to a higher degree since he advocated writing and the need for education. He penned textbooks for schools including those that he himself opened and he was a vocal supporter of ecumenism and led efforts to achieve greater dialogue with other faiths with an emphasis on the Eastern Orthodox Church.

His beatification had its origins in the 1930s, when petitions were lodged for a formal cause to commence; this all culminated on 19 September 1999, when Pope John Paul II presided over the late bishop's beatification in Maribor.

== Life ==
Anton Martin Slomšek was born as the eighth child to the peasants Marko Slomšek and Marija née Zorko on 26 November 1800 in Styria in Slovenia. The priest Blaž Slomšek (1708–1740) was his paternal uncle and Janez Slomšek (1831–1909) was his paternal cousin Gregorius' son.

He underwent his theological and philosophical studies since 1821 (a classmate was the poet France Prešeren) in order to enter the priesthood and he was later ordained as such on 8 September 1824 in Klagenfurt. He celebrated his first Mass on 26 September at Olimje. He first served as a parish chaplain at Bizeljsko and then at Nova Cerkev. From 1829 until 1838 he served as the spiritual director of seminarians at Klagenfurt. In 1838 he became the parish priest at Vuzenica. In 1844 he relocated to Sankt Andrä and headed the school in Lavant while also serving as the cathedral canon there. He became the parish priest in Celje in March 1846 just prior to his episcopal appointment. In one of his final appointments, Pope Gregory XVI, made Slomšek the new Bishop of Lavant and he received his episcopal consecration a couple of months later in Salzburg, although he did not celebrate his formal installation until September 1859, when he first moved to his new see.

He strove for religious education in schools and for education in Slovene; he began writing numerous books on the matter. Slomšek was considered to be an excellent preacher as well as a tireless and modest cleric. The bishop oversaw the construction of new schools and he himself issued textbooks for students and edited others while also publishing his own sermons and episcopal statements. He also wrote songs and some of which (like the toast "En hribček bom kupil") achieved great social standing and some are still sung at present. Together with Andrej Einspieler and Anton Janežič he was the co-founder of the Hermagoras Association which is the oldest Slovene publishing house. He founded movements for greater ecumenism efforts. Pope Pius IX entrusted him with the mission to renew the religious life in Benedictine monasteries and so he made a series of apostolic visits to see these places. He also invited the Vincentians to settle in his diocese and in 1846 began the publication Drobtinice for his diocese. He also founded the Brotherhood of Saints Cyril and Methodius in 1851 for greater ecumenism with the Eastern Orthodox Church. Slomšek also supported those in the missions and prompted the Spiritual Exercises.

Slomšek died on 24 September 1862 after having suffered a series of stomach ailments for some time. His remains are interred in the Maribor Cathedral.

== Beatification ==
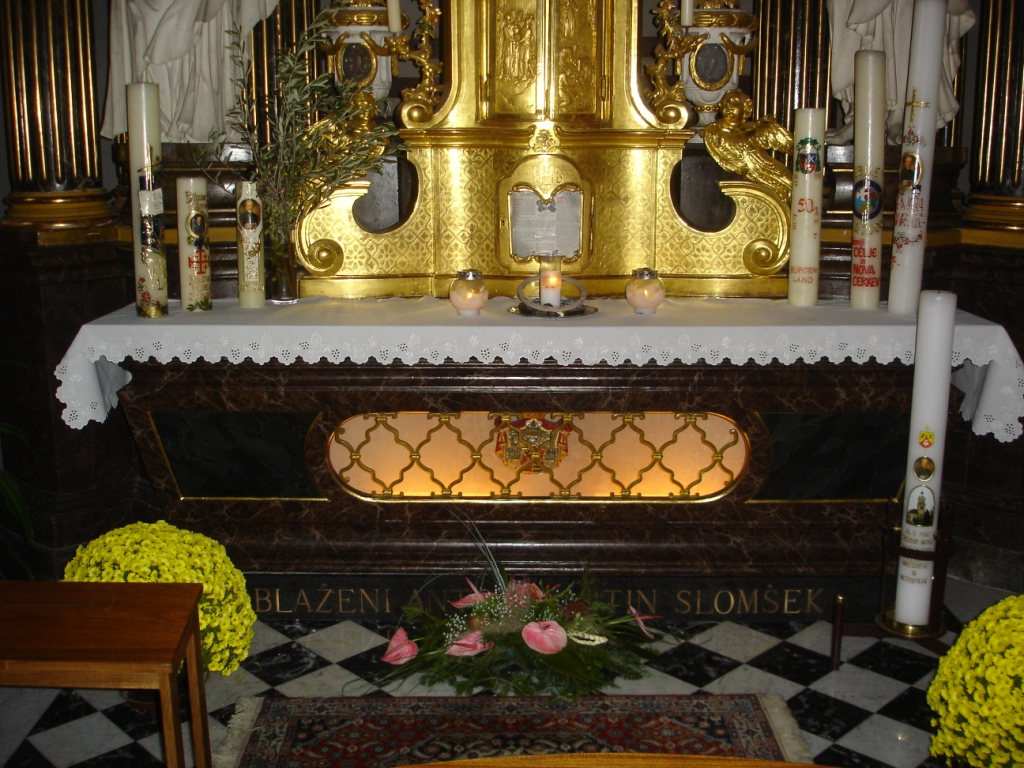
Tomb in the Maribor Cathedral

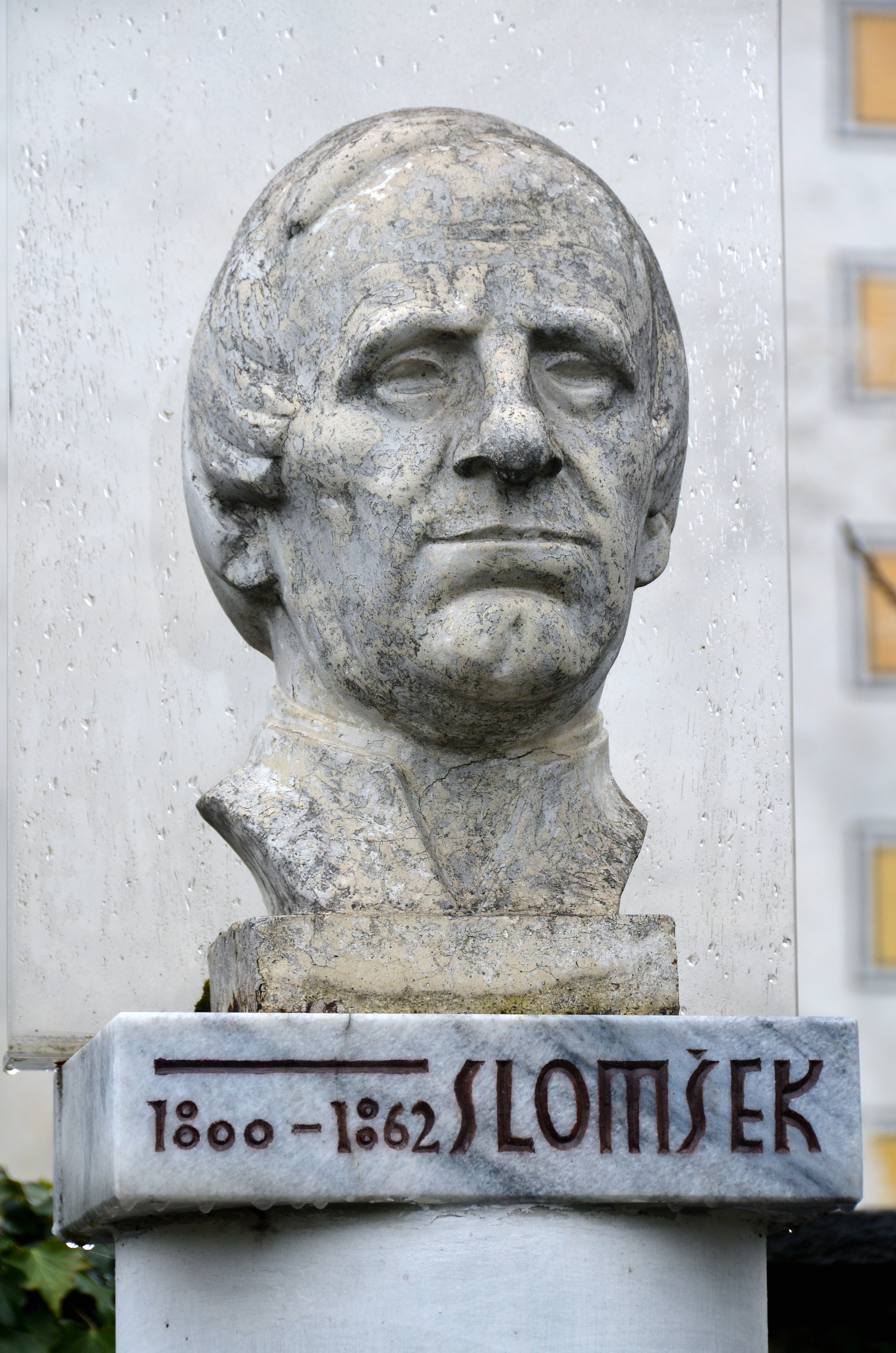
Bust

The beatification process opened in Maribor in an informative process that investigated his life and his virtues which later received validation on 2 December 1994 from the Congregation for the Causes of Saints; the postulation sent the Positio in 1995 to the C.C.S. for assessment. Historians first approved the cause on 9 January 1996 as did theologians on 2 April 1996 and the C.C.S. on 7 May 1996. His life of heroic virtue was confirmed on 13 May 1996 and this allowed for Pope John Paul II to title him as Venerable.

The miracle for his beatification was investigated and received C.C.S. validation on 20 June 1996 prior to a medical panel approving it on 4 February 1997; theologians did so also on 20 June 1997 as did the C.C.S. on 1 July 1998. John Paul II approved this miracle on 3 July 1998 and beatified Slomšek in Maribor while in Slovenia on 19 September 1999.

== Sources ==
- Šavli, Jožko, Slovenski svetniki Bilje: Studio Ro, Založništvo Humar 1999 ISBN 961-6097-03-2 COBISS 100488960
- Rebič, Adalbert, Splošni religijski leksikon Modrijan 2007 ISBN 978-961-2411-83-1 COBISS 235261696
